= Teen Mom: The Next Chapter =

American reality television series

- Genre: Reality television
- Developed by: Lauren Dolgen
- Starring: Amber Portwood; Ashley Jones; Briana DeJesus; Catelynn Baltierra; Cheyenne Floyd; Jade Cline; Leah Messer; Maci McKinney; Mackenzie Douthit
- Country of origin: United States
- Original language: English
- No. of seasons: 2
- No. of episodes: 66

Production
- Executive producers: Morgan J. Freeman; Dia Sokol Savage; Larry Musnik; Melissa Tallerine; Benjamin Hurvitz
- Camera setup: Multiple
- Running time: 42 minutes
- Production companies: 11th Street Productions; Paramount Television Studios (Note: Known as MTV Entertainment Studios for seasons 1–2)

Original release
- Network: MTV
- Release: September 6, 2022 – May 22, 2025

Related
- 16 and Pregnant; Teen Mom; Teen Mom 2; Teen Mom 3; Teen Mom: Young and Pregnant; Teen Mom: Family Reunion; Teen Mom: Girls' Night In; Teen Mom: Young Moms Club; Teen Mom UK

Teen Mom: The Next Chapter is an American reality television series broadcast by MTV. It premiered on September 6, 2022.

== Production ==
The series was first announced in May 2022, after the cancellation of both Teen Mom OG and Teen Mom 2. Returning cast members initially included: Amber Portwood, Catelynn Baltierra, Cheyenne Floyd and Maci McKinney from Teen Mom OG; Leah Messer from Teen Mom 2; Briana DeJesus from Teen Mom 3; Ashley Jones and Jade Cline from Teen Mom: Young and Pregnant.

== Cast ==
=== Main ===
- Catelynn Baltierra
- Maci McKinney
- Amber Portwood
- Cheyenne Floyd
- Leah Messer
- Briana DeJesus
- Jade Cline
- Ashley Jones
- Mackenzie Douthit (season 2)

=== Guest ===
- Jenelle Eason (season 1)
- Kailyn Lowry (season 2)

== Episodes ==
=== Series overview ===
Season	Episodes		Originally released	
Season	Episodes		First released	Last released
1	34	17	September 6, 2022	December 27, 2022
1	34	17	July 19, 2023	October 11, 2023
2	32	15	May 30, 2024	September 12, 2024
2	32	17	January 30, 2025	May 22, 2025

=== Season 1 (2022–2023) ===
No. overall	No. in season	Title	Original release date	US viewers (millions)
Part 1
1	1	"Wishful Thinking"	September 6, 2022	0.20
2	2	"You Go Do You"	September 13, 2022	0.24
3	3	"Give Yourself A Little Slack"	September 20, 2022	0.33
4	4	"Your Body Your Choice"	September 27, 2022	0.37
5	5	"Make Good Choices"	October 4, 2022	0.36
6	6	"Teen Mom Sisters for Life"	October 11, 2022	0.26
7	7	"I'm Tired, but I'm Fired Up"	October 18, 2022	0.25
8	8	"Welcome to Adulthood"	October 25, 2022	0.25
9	9	"You Guys Mated"	November 1, 2022	0.25
10	10	"Coparenting Rocks"	November 8, 2022	0.31
11	11	"You're His Keeper"	November 15, 2022	0.25
12	12	"Beautiful Chaos"	November 22, 2022	0.30
13	13	"Pumping the Breaks"	November 29, 2022	0.29
14	14	"Admit What You Have Done"	December 6, 2022	0.24
15	15	"Patient Love"	December 13, 2022	0.27
16	16	"Reunion Part 1"	December 20, 2022	0.33
17	17	"Reunion Part 2"	December 27, 2022	0.34
Part 2
18	18	"Who Raised You"	July 19, 2023	N/A
19	19	"Shooting Your Shot"	July 19, 2023	N/A
20	20	"Blood Moon"	July 26, 2023	N/A
21	21	"Strength Is a Mentality"	July 26, 2023	N/A
22	22	"Playing With Fire"	August 2, 2023	0.24
23	23	"No White Flags"	August 9, 2023	0.27
24	24	"You Know the Stakes"	August 16, 2023	0.28
25	25	"Tired of Playing Mama"	August 23, 2023	0.25
26	26	"Six Is A Vibe"	August 30, 2023	0.25
27	27	"Unbreakable"	September 6, 2023	N/A
28	28	"My Biggest Heartbreak"	September 13, 2023	N/A
29	29	"Hurt People, Hurt People"	September 20, 2023	N/A
30	30	"I Don't Want to Be a Victim"	September 27, 2023	N/A
31	31	"High Hopes, Low Expectations"	October 4, 2023	N/A
32	32	"Love Doesn't Go Away"	October 4, 2023	N/A
33	33	"Reunion Part 1"	October 11, 2023	N/A
34	34	"Reunion Part 2"	October 11, 2023	N/A

=== Season 2 (2024–2025) ===
No. overall	No. in season	Title	Original release date	US viewers (millions)
Part 1
35	1	"Till Death Do Us Part"	May 30, 2024	N/A
36	2	"Maybe This Is the Gary for You"	June 6, 2024	N/A
37	3	"Milk Duds, a Ring and a Baby"	June 13, 2024	N/A
38	4	"Get Me off This Rollercoaster"	June 20, 2024	N/A
39	5	"Pinky of a Promise"	June 27, 2024	N/A
40	6	"Viva Las Vegas"	July 11, 2024	N/A
41	7	"What Are We Gonna Do About Him?"	July 18, 2024	N/A
42	8	"Don't Test Me"	July 25, 2024	N/A
43	9	"A Toxic Triangle"	August 1, 2024	N/A
44	10	"My Past Is Whooping My Ass"	August 8, 2024	N/A
45	11	"Pursue You"	August 15, 2024	N/A
46	12	"One Big Happy Family"	August 22, 2024	N/A
47	13	"Don't Get Your Hopes Up"	August 29, 2024	N/A
48	14	"What's Your Excuse Now"	September 5, 2024	N/A
49	15	"Some Days are Victories"	September 12, 2024	N/A
Part 2
50	16	"A Whole New Era of Parenting"	January 30, 2025	0.21
51	17	"Two Steps Forward Ten Steps Back"	February 6, 2025	0.18
52	18	"Just Going To The Party To Party"	February 13, 2025	0.23
53	19	"Full Circle"	February 20, 2025	0.22
54	20	"Are You Kitten Me?"	February 27, 2025	0.25
55	21	"Three Times Is a Pattern"	March 6, 2025	N/A
56	22	"Somebody's Going to Get Hurt"	March 13, 2025	N/A
57	23	"You Got Real Mommy Problems"	March 20, 2025	N/A
58	24	"Throw Me In The Deep End"	March 27, 2025	N/A
59	25	"Stick Baby Stick"	April 3, 2025	N/A
60	26	"Don't Have a Baby With a Stranger"	April 10, 2025	N/A
61	27	"Shoot It Straight"	April 17, 2025	N/A
62	28	"Buy One, Get One Free"	April 24, 2025	N/A
63	29	"Super Sweet 16!"	May 1, 2025	N/A
64	30	"Ready or Not Here BabyComes"	May 8, 2025	N/A
65	31	"Go Cry About It"	May 15, 2025	N/A
66	32	"I'm Ready for the Next Chapter"	May 22, 2025	N/A
