= Teen Mom: Family Reunion =

American reality television series

- Genre: Reality
- Starring: Maci McKinney; Amber Portwood; Cheyenne Floyd; Leah Messer; Briana DeJesus; Jade Cline; Ashley Jones; Catelynn Baltierra; Kayla Sessler; Kiaya Elliott; Mackenzie McKee
- Country of origin: United States
- Original language: English
- No. of seasons: 3
- No. of episodes: 30

Production
- Executive producers: Morgan J. Freeman; Dia Sokol Savage; Larry Musnik
- Production companies: 11th Street Productions; MTV Entertainment Studios

Original release
- Network: MTV
- Release: January 11, 2022 – May 29, 2024

Related
- 16 and Pregnant; Teen Mom; Teen Mom 2; Teen Mom: Young and Pregnant; Teen Mom: The Next Chapter

Teen Mom: Family Reunion is a reality television series that is spun off from three of the network's reality shows: Teen Mom, Teen Mom 2, and Teen Mom: Young and Pregnant. The series premiered on January 11, 2022 on MTV.

== Production ==
On February 16, 2022, the series was renewed for a second season, with the entire cast, minus Messer, returning. Baltierra, who appeared as a guest in the first season, returned as a main cast member, and Sessler and Elliott from Teen Mom: Young and Pregnant joined the cast.

A third season premiered on March 13, 2024, with McKee being added to the main cast. Jones and Portwood did not return for the new season. The season featured: Maci and Taylor McKinney, Catelynn and Tyler Baltierra, Jade Cline and Sean Austin, Cory Wharton and Taylor Selfridge, Cheyenne and Zach Davis, Kayla Sessler and Ryan Leigh, Mackenzie McKee and Khesanio Hall, Briana DeJesus, Leah Messer, and Kiaya Elliot.

== Cast ==
Cast member	Seasons		
Cast member	1	2	3
Farrah Abraham	Guest		
Catelynn Baltierra	Guest	Main	Main
Jade Cline	Main	Main	Main
Briana DeJesus	Main	Main	Main
Cheyenne Floyd	Main	Main	Main
Ashley Jones	Main	Main	
Maci McKinney	Main	Main	Main
Leah Messer	Main		Main
Amber Portwood	Main	Main	
Kiaya Elliott		Main	Main
Kayla Sessler		Main	Main
Mackenzie Douthit			Main

The third season cast was Maci and Taylor McKinney, Catelynn and Tyler Baltierra, Jade Cline and Sean Austin, Cory Wharton and Taylor Selfridge, Cheyenne and Zach Davis, Kayla Sessler and Ryan Leigh, Mackenzie McKee and Khesanio Hall, Briana Dejesus, Leah Messer, and Kiaya Elliot.

== Episodes ==
=== Series overview ===
Season	Episodes	Originally released	
Season	Episodes	First released	Last released
1	8	January 11, 2022	March 1, 2022
2	10	January 3, 2023	February 21, 2023
3	12	March 13, 2024	May 29, 2024

=== Season 1 (2022) ===
No. overall	No. in season	Title	Original release date	US viewers (millions)
1	1	"Mother of All Reunions"	January 11, 2022	0.46
2	2	"Don't Rock the Boat"	January 18, 2022	0.42
3	3	"Never Have I Ever"	January 25, 2022	0.47
4	4	"Welcome to Farrah-Dise"	February 1, 2022	0.38
5	5	"Ride the Wave"	February 8, 2022	0.36
6	6	"Highwire Act"	February 15, 2022	0.36
7	7	"Tiny Bubbles but Big Troubles"	February 22, 2022	0.39
8	8	"Burn Baby Burn"	March 1, 2022	0.30

=== Season 2 (2023) ===
No. overall	No. in season	Title	Original release date	US viewers (millions)
9	1	"Grandmother of All Reunions"	January 3, 2023	0.33
10	2	"Mudslide"	January 10, 2023	0.31
11	3	"Double Mamma Drama"	January 17, 2023	0.27
12	4	"Floating Down the River"	January 24, 2023	0.29
13	5	"High Altitude, Bigger Attitude"	January 31, 2023	0.37
14	6	"Gettin' Wiggy With It"	February 7, 2023	0.29
15	7	"Lost in the Woods"	February 14, 2023	0.28
16	8	"We Are Family"	February 14, 2023	0.21
17	9	"The AfterMath, Reunion Part 1"	February 21, 2023	0.24
18	10	"The AfterMath, Reunion Part 2"	February 21, 2023	0.22

=== Season 3 (2024) ===
No. overall	No. in season	Title	Original release date	US viewers (millions)
19	1	"Couples Take Cartagena!"	March 13, 2024	N/A
20	2	"Get the Moan Out"	March 20, 2024	N/A
21	3	"Time to Get Naked!"	March 27, 2024	N/A
22	4	"In the Driver's Seat"	April 3, 2024	N/A
23	5	"Ice Ice Baby"	April 10, 2024	N/A
24	6	"Rooftop Romance & Red Flags"	April 17, 2024	N/A
25	7	"Something's Fishy"	April 24, 2024	N/A
26	8	"Trouble Comes in Threes"	May 1, 2024	N/A
27	9	"Bride or Die"	May 8, 2024	N/A
28	10	"Line in the Sand"	May 15, 2024	N/A
29	11	"Time's Up"	May 22, 2024	N/A
30	12	"Fireside Farewell"	May 29, 2024	N/A
