= Post Hill Press =

American publishing company

- Founded: 2013
- Country of origin: United States
- Headquarters location: New York City, New York; Nashville, Tennessee
- Distribution: Simon & Schuster
- Key people: Anthony Ziccardi (publisher); Michael L. Wilson (president)
- Publication types: Books
- Official website: posthillpress.com

Post Hill Press, distributed by Simon & Schuster, is a small United States print and e-book publishing house that focuses on publishing "conservative politics" and Christian titles. The company was founded in 2013, and has offices in New York City and Nashville, Tennessee.

In 2017, the company added the Bombardier Books division for conservative politics and military books. In August 2020, they announced a new imprint, Emancipation Books, to "give a voice to black and minority authors — including conservatives, libertarians, traditional liberals, and iconoclasts — whose nonconforming views are seldom represented in mainstream media, and find themselves increasingly unwelcome at the larger publishing houses."

Books published by Post Hill include those by a range of media and political figures, entertainers, motivational speakers, and commentators.

Post Hill's publisher is Anthony Ziccardi, formerly publisher of Humanix Books, a division of Newsmax Media, and associate publisher of Simon & Schuster's Gallery imprint.

In March 2019, Post Hill acquired Fidelis Books from LifeWay Christian Resources.

== Controversies ==
In 2021 the press announced plans to publish a memoir by Sgt. Jonathan Mattingly, a police officer in Louisville, Kentucky who was wounded during the 2020 raid on the apartment of Breonna Taylor that resulted in her death. There was widespread opposition to this proposal on social media. The regular distributor, Simon & Schuster, said that it would not handle this book.

== List of authors published ==
- Woody Allen
- Dan Bongino
- Mel Robbins
- K. T. McFarland
- Anna Paulina Luna
- Adam Carolla
- Ramani Durvasula
- Steve Lukather
- Kendis Gibson
- Philip A. Glotzbach
- Robert Woodson
- Oliver North
- Reggie Williams
- Teen Mom stars Maci Bookout, Amber Portwood, Catelynn Lowell
- Patricia Velásquez, a Venezuelan actress and supermodel
- Herman Cain, former cabinet officer and presidential candidate
- Richard Riordan, politician and former Los Angeles Mayor
- Karina Smirnoff, dancer from Dancing with the Stars
