= Teenage pregnancy in the United States =

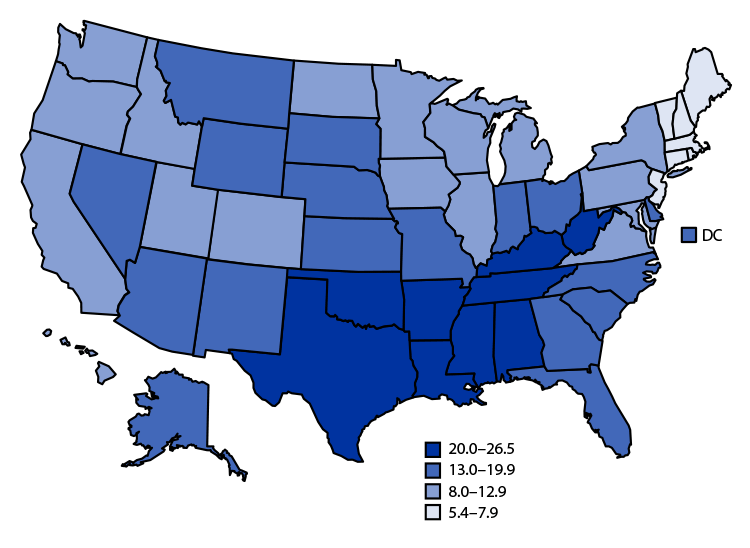
Birth rates of teenagers 15–19 per 1,000 people by state in 2021

Teenage pregnancy in the United States occurs mostly unintentionally and out of wedlock but has been declining almost continuously since the 1990s. Between the late 2000s and the early 2020s, the adolescent birth rate dropped by about two thirds. In 2025, it stood at 11.7 per 1,000 girls aged 15 to 19, the lowest on record. For comparison, it was 61.8 in 1991. According to the Centers for Disease Control and Prevention (CDC), this decline is due to abstinence and the use of contraception.

The averages conceal significant ethnic or geographic differences within the US. The birth rates for Hispanic and African-American teens were more than double those of European-American teens, while Asian-American adolescents have the lowest pregnancy and birth rates of all. As of 2021, the Southern United States had the highest adolescent birth rates in the Union. (See map.)

Since 2012, the birth rate of American girls aged 15 to 19 has fallen below the OECD average, though it still remains above that of many other industrialized nations. As of 2024, the rate of decline has faltered.

== General facts and statistics ==
Teen pregnancy is defined as pregnancies in girls under the age of 20, regardless of marital status.

=== Recent trends ===
Teen birth rates in the US have declined over the past few decades.

According to Child Trends research institute, prevalence of teen birth in the United States has plummeted between the early 1990s and 2020s. Teenage birth rates, as opposed to just pregnancies, peaked in 1991, when there were 61.8 births per 1,000 teens. In 2014, 249,078 babies were born to girls 15 to 19 years of age, corresponding to a birth rate of 24.2 per 1,000 girls. In 2008, three in ten American girls fell pregnant before age 20, corresponding to almost 750,000 pregnancies a year.

In 2008, 16% of all girls became teen mothers. Among girls 15 to 19, birth rates fell 77% between the 1990s and 2020s. In 2016, researchers from the Guttmacher Institute were able to show that the fall in teenage birthrates is likely not due to terminated pregnancies. The number of abortions remained the same or decreased in all U.S. states except for Vermont.

In 2010, an estimated 60% pregnancies to adolescent females ended in live birth, 15% ended in miscarriage, and 30% in abortion. The number of hospital stays for teen pregnancies decreased by 47 percent from 2000 to 2012, when there were 104,700 maternal hospital stays for pregnant teens. Most of the adolescents who give birth are over the age of 18. For example, in 2008, 6.6 pregnancies occurred per 1,000 teens aged 13–14. In other words, fewer than 1% of teens younger than 15 became pregnant in 2008.

Contemporary teenagers are becoming better at avoiding pregnancies by abstinence or by using contraception. A CDC analysis found that the rates of teens using a long-acting and reversible method of contraception, such as an intrauterine device (IUD), jumped from 0.4% in 2005 to 7.1% in 2013. Adolescents are also less likely to get married at their age. In 2006, nearly 80% of teenage fathers did not marry the teenage mothers of their children. In the same year, 89% of teenage births occurred outside of marriage. Some states allow minors to get married if the girl is pregnant. In these cases, though, the husband is typically much older, and the bride's parents may be the ones who force her to get married for cultural or religious reasons. In some cases, the parents may force the teenage girl to marry her rapist if he impregnated her to avoid an investigation by the child protective services.

=== Attitudes ===
In a 2013 study, most female teens reported that they would be very upset (58%) or a little upset (29%) if they got pregnant, while the remaining 13% reported that they would be a little or very pleased. Most male teens reported that they would be very upset (47%) or a little upset (34%) if they got someone pregnant, while the remaining 18% reported that they would be a little or very pleased.

=== Risk factors ===
Girls who were cohabiting, poorly educated, drug abusers, alcoholics, and came from low-income or unstable households were at the highest risks of unintentional pregnancies. Teenage fathers have 10-15% lower annual earnings than teenagers who do not father children. Girls raised by single parents have higher than average rates of teenage pregnancy. According to the Centers for Disease Control, more than four out of five, or 80%, of teenage pregnancies are unintended.

=== Intentional pregnancies ===
In 2002, according to the Journal of Pediatric Health Care, approximately 15% of all adolescent pregnancies were planned. Based upon interviews conducted with pregnant teenagers, there are particular themes based upon wants and needs. Some of the wants expressed by teens includes, "(a) the desire to be or be perceived as more grown up, with increased responsibility, independence and maturity; (b) a long history of desiring pregnancy and the maternal role; c) never having had anything to call their own and wanting something to care for and love and (d) the pregnancy was the natural next step in their life or their relationship with their boyfriend."

== Rates by ethnicity ==
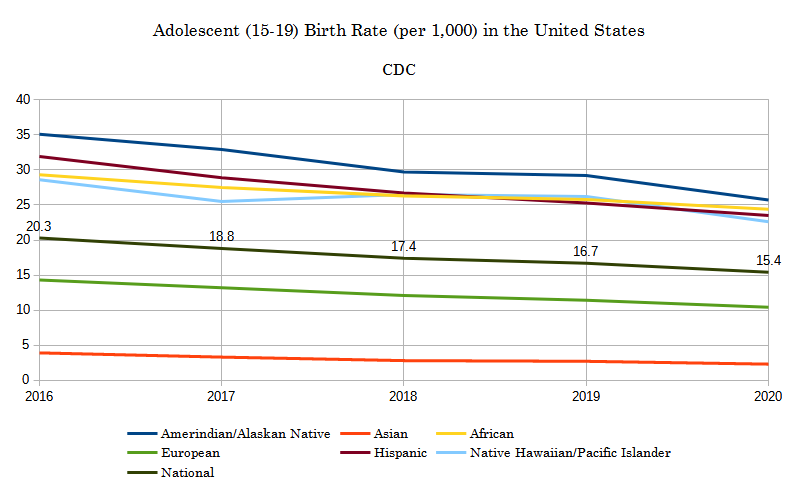
US teenage birth rates declined for all racial or ethnic groups from 2016 to 2020. Asian Americans have the lowest rates of all.

In 2016, Black, Latino, and Native-American youth had the highest rates of teenage pregnancy and childbirth. In 2014, For every 1,000 black boys in the United States, 29 of them are teenage fathers, compared to 14 per 1,000 white boys. The rate of teen fatherhood declined 36% between 1991 and 2010, from 25 to 16 per 1,000 males aged 15–19. This decline was more substantial among blacks than among whites (50% vs. 26%) and about half of the rate among teen girls. Studies in 2008 and 2013 indicated that Asians (23 per 1,000) and whites (43 per 1,000) have lower rates of pregnancy before the age of 20.

Teen birth rates decline by racial groups

Teen birth rates declined from 2018 to 2019 for several racial groups and for Hispanics.Among 15- to 19-year-olds, teen birth rates decreased:

- 5.2% for Hispanic females.
- 5.8% for non-Hispanic White females.
- 1.9% for non-Hispanic Black females.

Rates for non-Hispanic American Indian/Alaska Natives (AI/AN), non-Hispanic Asians, and non-Hispanic Native Hawaiian, and other Pacific Islander teenagers were unchanged.

In 2019, the birth rates for Hispanic teens (25.3 per 1,000) and non-Hispanic Black teens (25.8 per 1,000) were more than two times higher than the rate for non-Hispanic White teens (11.4 per 1,000). The birth rate of American Indian/Alaska Native teens (29.2 per 1,000) was highest among all race/ethnicities.

== Rates by region ==
In 2013, the lowest birth rates were reported in the Northeast. The highest rates were located in the Southeast.

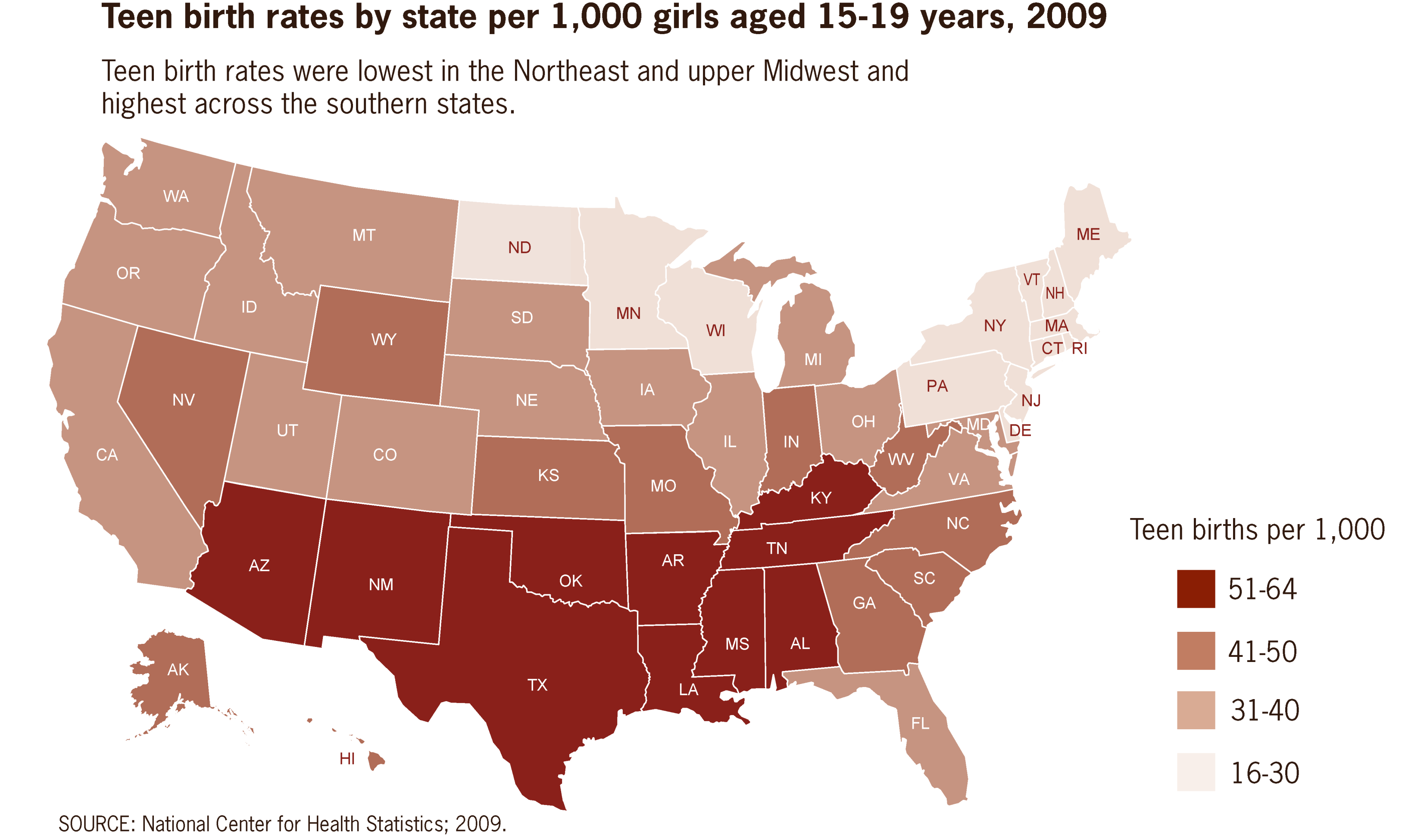

=== Birth and abortion rates of girls ages 15–19, 2010 ===
US State	Pregnancy rate (per 1000)	Birthrate	Abortion rate	% Abortion rate excluding stillborns and miscarriages
Alabama	62	32	9	17
Alaska	64	27.8	17	30
Arizona	60	29.9	9	18
Arkansas	73	39.5	9	14
California	59	21.1	19	38
Colorado	50	20.3	10	20
Connecticut	44	11.5	20	52
Delaware	15	20.7	28	47
Washington, D.C.	90	28.4	32	41
Florida	60	22.5	19	38
Georgia	64	28.4	13	24
Hawaii	65	23.1	23	42
Idaho	47	23.2	7	17
Illinois	57	22.8	15	32
Indiana	53	28	7	16
Iowa	44	19.8	9	23
Kansas	53	27.6	5	12
Kentucky	62	35.3	6	12
Louisiana	69	35.8	10	18
Maine	37	16.5	10	31
Maryland	57	17.8	22	45
Massachusetts	37	10.6	14	46
Michigan	52	21.1	14	32
Minnesota	36	15.5	8	25
Mississippi	76	38	9	14
Missouri	54	27.2	9	19
Montana	53	26.4	10	21
Nebraska	43	22.2	5	14
Nevada	68	28.5	20	34
New Hampshire	28	11	8	35
New Jersey	51	13.1	24	55
New Mexico	80	37.8	15	22
New York	63	16.1	32	58
North Carolina	59	25.9	12	24
North Dakota	42	23.9	6	18
Ohio	54	25.1	12	25
Oklahoma	69	38.5	8	13
Oregon	47	19.3	12	29
Pennsylvania	49	13.8	15	35
Rhode Island	44	15.8	16	41
South Carolina	65	28.5	13	23
South Dakota	47	26.2	4	11
Tennessee	62	33	9	18
Texas	73	37.8	9	15
Utah	38	19.4	4	13
Vermont	32	14.2	9	34
Virginia	48	18.4	14	33
Washington	49	19.1	16	37
West Virginia	64	36.6	9	17
Wisconsin	39	18	7	21
Wyoming	56	30.1	8	17

== Parenting as a teenager ==
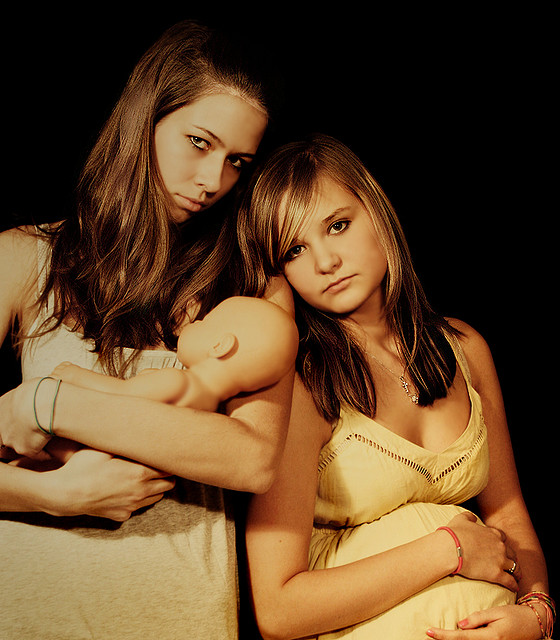
An anti-teenage pregnancy poster

In 2008, about 25% of teenage mothers had a second child within 24 months of the first birth.

Parenting as a teenager has detrimental effects on the parents as well as the children. Pregnant teenage girls tend to gain less weight than older mothers, due to the fact that they are still growing and competing for nutrients with the baby during the pregnancy. Teenage parents are considerably more likely to drop out of high school in order to work. This is because child-rearing is expensive and requires a lot of attention, and the typical teenager is unable to handle the responsibilities of schoolwork, earning a living, and childcare.

After becoming parents at such an early age, these teenagers often find themselves socially isolated from their peers. Following the Great Recession of the late 2000s, young people take longer to gain financial independence than their counterparts three decades ago. It is much harder for teenage parents to be able to support a family compared to the past, due to the competitive work environment.

Children born to teenage parents are more likely to be born prematurely, to do poorly at school, to live in poverty, and to suffer higher rates of relationship abuse. They tend to repeat the cycle of early childbearing out of wedlock, and early marriage of their parents. The sons of teen mothers are 13% more likely to end up incarcerated, and the daughters of teenage mothers are 22% more likely to become teenage mothers. More than 25% of teen mothers live in poverty during their 20s.

== Supporting teenage parents ==
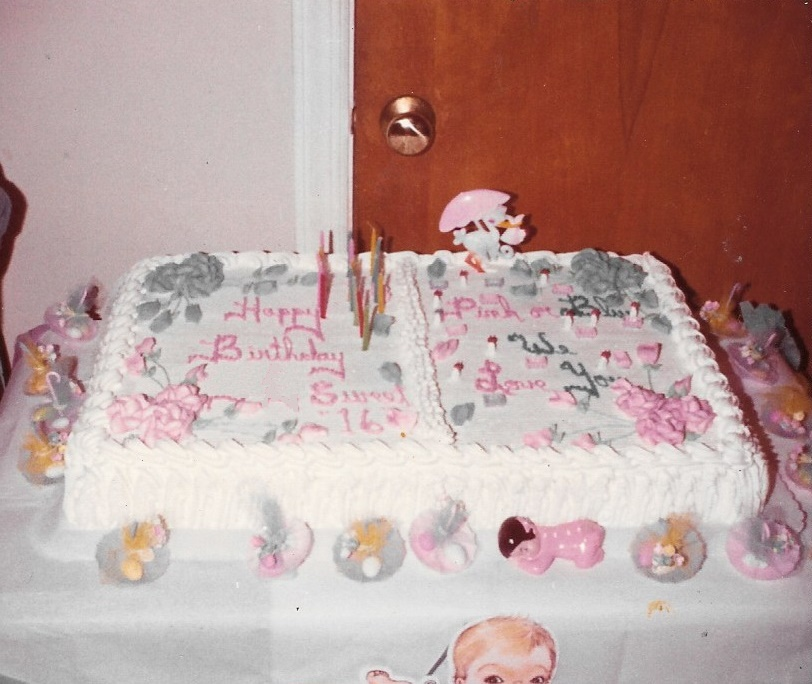
"Happy Birthday Sweet 16" / "Pink or Blue, We Love You" cake

Some high schools in the United States offer a program for pregnant and parenting teens to continue their education.

A 2007 study found that when teen parents stay in school after being pregnant, they have a better chance of graduating high school. In 2016, less than 2% of teen moms earn a college degree by age 30. Many of these programs offer on-campus childcare. Some require the pregnant and parenting teens to attend parenting classes or practicum classes. The parenting classes offer a place for these young parents to learn about the basic needs of a child. The practical classes offer a hands on experience caring for the children in the childcare center.

== Prevention ==
Preventing Teen Pregnancy graphic by Centers for Disease Control and Prevention

The United States has the highest rates of teenage pregnancy and sexually transmitted diseases in developed countries. The two primary reasons given by teenagers for not using any form of protection is that they think the female partner is unlikely to fall pregnant or that they fail to anticipate intercourse.

The best method of reducing the consequences of teenage parenthood is by providing reproductive health services to prevent teenagers from becoming pregnant in the first place. According to behavioral economist Richard Thaler, the most effective preventative measures has to be simple in nature. To that end, long-term reversible contraceptives, such as an IUD, are good options. An IUD has a low rate of failure and requires no further action once implanted.

Prevention can be beneficial on a micro level and on a more macro scale. Nationally, teen pregnancies cost tax payers an average of $9.4 billion each year. These costs are associated with health care, foster care, criminal justice, public assistance and lost tax revenue. Another method is to reform the curriculum for sex education. While traditional lessons involving bananas and condoms remain common, newer approaches that emphasize financial responsibility and character development have been implemented. As previously mentioned, contemporary American teenagers are much more likely to use contraception when engaging in sexual intercourse than in the past. These reforms play a role in the significant drop in teenage birthrates.

== International comparison ==
In 2016, the United States had a high adolescent birth rate relative to other developed nations.

There are large differences in adolescent pregnancy rates among developed nations like Canada, France, Great Britain, Sweden and the United States. The United States has the highest number of teen pregnancies and the highest number of sexually transmitted infections compared to the other four countries.

In France and Sweden during the late 1990s, pregnancies were 20 per 1,000 girls at ages 15–19. In Canada and Great Britain the levels were twice that. In the United States, the level was 4 times as high, with 84 per 1,000 teenage girls pregnant. The likelihood of pregnant teenage girls having abortions across the four countries differ and exclude miscarriages. In the U.S. abortion rates for 15–19 years are 35%, compared to 69% in Sweden, 39% in Great Britain, 46% in Canada, and 51% in France.

The quality of sex education varies across the U.S., with some states offering more comprehensive education than others. 39 states require "some" education related to sexuality. 25 states are required by law to teach sex and HIV education. 17 states only require the teaching of STIs. 20 states require provision of information on contraception. 39 states are required to provide information on abstinence. Eleven states have no requirement.

== In popular media ==
In a 2014 paper, economists Melissa S. Kearney and Phillip B. Levine, both fellows of the Brookings Institution, were able to show that popular TV programs depicting the reality of teenage parenthood, such as MTV's 16 and Pregnant and its sequels (Teen Mom, Teen Mom 2, Teen Mom 3, Teen Mom: Young and Pregnant), have played a significant role in the reduction of teenage childbearing. The girls who watched any one of these shows also reported being able to predict the behaviors and intentions that result in teenage pregnancy.

== See also ==
- Minors and abortion#United States
- Native Americans and reservation inequality#Teenage pregnancy
- Prevalence of teenage pregnancy in the United States
