= Teen mom =

A teen mom is an individual that has undergone teenage pregnancy and given birth before they turn 20 but after or when they turn 13.

Teen Mom may also refer to the following television shows:

- 16 and Pregnant, the show from which the "Teen Mom" franchise is derived
  - Teen Mom, a.k.a. "Teen Mom 1" or "Teen Mom OG", spin-off of the first season of 16 and Pregnant
  - Teen Mom 2, spin-off of the second season of 16 and Pregnant
  - Teen Mom 3, spin-off of the fourth season of 16 and Pregnant
