= Teen Mom Australia =

Australian reality television series

- Genre: Reality television
- Country of origin: Australia
- Original language: English
- No. of series: 2
- No. of episodes: 18

Production
- Running time: 30 minutes

Original release
- Network: MTV Australia; 10 Shake
- Release: 7 July 2019 – present

Related
- Teen Mom; Teen Mom 2 Teen Mom UK; Teen Mom Poland

Teen Mom Australia is an Australian reality television series which is a spin-off of the American franchise Teen Mom. It currently airs on Nickelodeon (Formerly 10 Shake) and MTV. The series was first screened on MTV in July 2019. The second season premiered on MTV and 10 Shake in October 2020. It follows the lives of Australian teenage mums who are trying to make it through motherhood.

== Episodes ==
=== Series overview ===
Series	Episodes	Originally released	
Series	Episodes	First released	Last released
1	11	7 July 2019	15 September 2019
2	8	27 October 2020	15 December 2020

=== Series 1 (2019) ===
No. overall	No. in season	Title	Original release date
1	1	"Episode 1"	7 July 2019
2	2	"Episode 2"	14 July 2019
3	3	"Episode 3"	21 July 2019
4	4	"Episode 4"	28 July 2019
5	5	"Episode 5"	4 August 2019
6	6	"Episode 6"	11 August 2019
7	7	"Episode 7"	18 August 2019
9	9	"Episode 9"	1 September 2019
10	10	"Episode 10"	8 September 2019
11	11	"Reunion"	15 September 2019

=== Series 2 (2020) ===
No. overall	No. in season	Title	Original release date
12	1	"Episode 1"	27 October 2020
13	2	"Episode 2"	3 November 2020
14	3	"Episode 3"	10 November 2020
15	4	"Episode 4"	17 November 2020
16	5	"Episode 5"	24 November 2020
17	6	"Episode 6"	1 December 2020
18	7	"Episode 7"	8 December 2020
19	8	"Episode 8"	15 December 2020
