= List of Teen Mom episodes =

Teen Mom (renamed Teen Mom OG from the fifth season) is an American reality television series broadcast by MTV. It is the first spin-off of 16 and Pregnant, and it focuses on the lives of several young mothers as they navigate motherhood and strained family and romantic relationships. Its first run consists of four seasons originally aired between December 8, 2009, and October 9, 2012, while another four seasons have aired during its second run that began on March 23, 2015.

== Series overview ==
Season	Episodes		Originally released	
Season	Episodes		First released	Last released
1	8		December 8, 2009	January 26, 2010
2	12		July 20, 2010	October 12, 2010
3	12		July 5, 2011	September 20, 2011
4	12		June 12, 2012	August 28, 2012
5	20	10	March 23, 2015	May 25, 2015
5	20	10	January 4, 2016	February 22, 2016
6	27	15	August 22, 2016	November 28, 2016
6	27	12	April 17, 2017	June 26, 2017
7	30	18	November 27, 2017	April 9, 2018
7	30	12	October 1, 2018	December 17, 2018
8	24	12	June 10, 2019	August 19, 2019
8	24	12	March 17, 2020	June 2, 2020
9	24	12	January 26, 2021	April 13, 2021
9	24	12	September 7, 2021	November 23, 2021

== Episodes ==
=== Season 1 (2009–10) ===
No. overall	No. in season	Title	Original release date	US viewers (millions)
1	1	"Looking for Love"	December 8, 2009	2.10
Single teen mom Farrah starts dating against her family's wishes while Maci begins planning her wedding to fiancé Ryan. Catelynn moves back home with her parents and Amber's anxiety about being a mother gets the best of her.
2	2	"How Many Chances?"	December 15, 2009	N/A
Maci contemplates breaking up with her fiancé, Ryan, Farrah starts dating a new guy even though her family disapproves. Amber struggles to get her GED, and Catelynn feels distant from her daughter since the adoption.
3	3	"Fallout"	December 22, 2009	N/A
Catelynn's family lashes out over her choice of adoption while Amber and her fiancé Gary come to blows. Farrah learns that dating isn't easy, and Maci struggles to balanced motherhood and school.
4	4	"Moving On"	December 29, 2009	N/A
Amber and Gary's arguing finally reaches a boiling point, while Catelynn struggles to find a home when her mother moves away. Newly-single mom Maci has a change of heart, and boy-crazy Farrah opts for some protection.
5	5	"A Little Help"	January 5, 2010	N/A
Catelyn chooses adoption during a weekend retreat with other birth moms, while Maci and Ryan reach out to a counselor. Amber thinks about accepting help from her ex, and Farrah wonders if she should stay home more with her baby.
6	6	"Standing Up"	January 12, 2010	N/A
Maci struggles with resenting her boyfriend, while Catelynn worries her boyfriend's father might go to jail. Farrah shifts her focus to her daughter, and Amber faces her fears about putting her baby in daycare.
7	7	"Baby Steps"	January 19, 2010	N/A
Amber wants to put an end to the fighting and move away from Gary. Farrah can't stand living under her parents' roof anymore. Maci struggles to keep up in school when her son starts walking. Catelyn and Tyler plan their future.
8	8	"Happy Birthday"	January 26, 2010	N/A
Catelynn & Tyler work on letting go of Carly, & Tyler works up the nerve to propose marriage to Catelynn. Maci and Ryan celebrate Bentley's first birthday. Amber copes with the pressures while planning Leah's 1st birthday.

=== Season 2 (2010) ===
No. overall	No. in season	Title	Original release date	US viewers (millions)
9	1	"Not Again"	July 20, 2010	N/A
Farrah calls the police on her own mother. Amber faces a pregnancy scare. Maci takes her ex, Ryan, to court for child support. Catelynn is upset that she has to move out of her boyfriend's house and back in with her family.
10	2	"Should I Stay or Should I Go"	July 27, 2010	N/A
Catelynn is caught lying. Amber's boyfriend might leave her for someone else. Farrah juggles college, a new job and moving houses - all with her daughter Sophia. Maci tries to move into a house with her college friends.
11	3	"Valentine's Day"	August 3, 2010	N/A
Maci reconnects with an old flame on Valentine's Day. Their crying baby and unrealistic expectations ruin Amber and Gary's romantic dinner. Catelynn's boyfriend struggles about the adoption. Farrah reveals an emotional secret.
12	4	"Spring Break"	August 10, 2010	N/A
Amber and Gary take a vacation. Maci and Ryan butt heads over Ryan's new girlfriend. Farrah's mom is offered a plea bargain for their physical altercation. Catelynn finds out Tyler is still angry at her about a past lie.
13	5	"Secrets & Lies"	August 17, 2010	N/A
Catelynn and Tyler find their high school romance back on the rocks, a big fight makes Amber question her engagement to Gary, Maci introduces her new boyfriend to her son Bentley and Farrah gets scammed.
14	6	"Trial and Error"	August 31, 2010	N/A
Maci questions whether her new boyfriend is ready to date a teen mom while Farrah tries speed dating. Amber works toward her GED and Catelynn's stepdad is court-ordered to rehab, leaving her alone with her guilt-inducing mom.
15	7	"Senior Prom"	September 7, 2010	N/A
An argument about the adoption ruins Catelynn's prom dress shopping; Maci is upset when Ryan says he's taking her to court over custody of Bentley. Farrah goes to counseling with her mom and Gary ruins Amber's birthday plans.
16	8	"Hello and Goodbye"	September 14, 2010	N/A
Amber and Gary's wedding plans fall apart, while Farrah considers moving back into her mother's house. Catelynn and Tyler celebrate their daughter Carly's first birthday from afar and Maci tells her parents that she's moving.
17	9	"Family Bonds"	September 21, 2010	N/A
Farrah reaches out to Sophia's dad's family in an attempt to get Social Security benefits for Sophia. Maci tells Ryan she is moving to Nashville, while Catelynn and Tyler learn Butch has ended up back in jail.
18	10	"Lashing Out"	September 28, 2010	N/A
Amber lashes out at Gary when he threatens to take Leah away. Catelynn and Tyler find out they will not graduate from High School on time. Maci tries to work out a visitation schedule with Ryan. Farrah has an emotional reunion.
19	11	"Too Much, Too Soon"	October 5, 2010	N/A
Maci confronts Kyle about her new life in Nashville. Catelynn and Tyler learn they will get to go visit Carly for the first time in a year. Amber breaks it off with Gary. Farrah learns the results of Sophia's DNA test.
20	12	"See You Later"	October 12, 2010	N/A
A year after the adoption, Catelynn and Tyler have an emotional reunion with their daughter. Amber & Gary try to work out custody of Leah. Farrah's mom sets her up on a date. Maci and Ryan battle over parental rights.

=== Season 3 (2011) ===
No. overall	No. in season	Title	Original release date	US viewers (millions)
21	1	"Taking It Slow"	July 5, 2011	N/A
Teen Mom Maci confronts her ex about child support. Amber chooses between her baby's dad and her new boyfriend. Catelynn and Tyler consider moving in together while still in high school.
22	2	"To Be with You"	July 12, 2011	N/A
Amber and Gary move in together while Tyler's family questions his decision to move in with Catelynn. Maci considers letting her boyfriend move in to make ends meet and Farrah struggles with being away from Sophia.
23	3	"The Last Straw"	July 19, 2011	N/A
Amber finds out that she is being investigated, and fears she will lose custody. Ryan wants to meet Maci's new boyfriend, while Sophia's paternal grandmother is suing for visitation rights. Tyler's father leaves jail.
24	4	"Trials and Tribulations"	July 26, 2011	N/A
Catelynn struggles to fix her relationship with her mother, while Amber and Gary meet with Child Protective Services. Maci finally decides to move away from Kyle and back home to Chattanooga, and Farrah goes to court.
25	5	"Trick or Treat"	August 2, 2011	N/A
Maci and Ryan argue over who has rights to Bentley on his birthday, and Amber breaks down over being separated from Leah. Farrah struggles to spend time with Sophia, and Catelynn and Tyler look for jobs.
26	6	"Terrible Twos"	August 9, 2011	N/A
Amber is upset when Gary refuses to celebrate Leah's birthday together, and Catelynn copes with her fears about adoption. Farrah gets a puppy, while Maci's Ex finally discovers that her boyfriend is living with her.
27	7	"Without You"	August 16, 2011	N/A
Farrah takes her daughter Sophia on a trip to visit Sophia's dad's grave, and Amber and her mother argue. Maci struggles to keep up in college, while Catelynn and Tyler want to invite their daughter to graduation.
28	8	"Taking It Up a Notch"	August 23, 2011	N/A
Amber goes on a date, while Catelynn and Tyler get their parents involved with planning a perfect Christmas. Maci makes a shocking announcement, and Farrah breaks the news to her parents that she wants to move to California.
29	9	"As Long as We're Together"	August 30, 2011	N/A
Farrah and her parents argue while on a trip, and Catelynn reunites with her father. Amber reaches out to Gary to re-unite her family on the anniversary of a tragedy, while Maci considers withdrawing from school.
30	10	"Stay with Me"	September 6, 2011	N/A
Amber spends the night in jail, and finds out that a no-contact order has been put on her and Gary. Catelynn and Tyler have a falling out, and Farrah explores moving to Florida. Maci is overwhelmed while taking care of Bentley.
31	11	"Time Out"	September 13, 2011	N/A
Maci has a blowout with Ryan over custody, while Amber and Gary struggle with a no-contact order. Catelynn finally finishes high school, and Farrah's parents try to talk her into leaving Sophia behind when she moves away.
32	12	"Pros & Cons"	September 20, 2011	N/A
Amber and Gary try to get the no-contact order lifted, while Maci tries to cut Ryan out of her life. Farrah makes an unexpected choice about moving away, and Butch moves in with Catelynn and Tyler.

=== Season 4 (2012) ===
No. overall	No. in season	Title	Original release date	US viewers (millions)
33	1	"Separation Anxiety"	June 12, 2012	N/A
Maci decides to enroll Bentley in daycare while Amber prepares to go to rehab. Catelynn and Tyler celebrate Carly's second birthday, and Farrah has a change of heart about leaving daughter Sophia behind when she moves.
34	2	"Letting Go"	June 12, 2012	N/A
Catelynn and Tyler have an emotional visit with their daughter. Amber struggles during her first weeks of rehab. Farrah says farewell to her life in Iowa. A disagreement with Ryan disrupts Maci and Kyle's relationship.
35	3	"The Places You'll Go"	June 19, 2012	N/A
Catelynn and Tyler attend their high school graduation. Maci considers joining Ryan on his family vacation. Farrah has to deal with her parents' overbearing concerns. In rehab, Amber expects a visit from Gary and Leah.
36	4	"Strike Out"	June 26, 2012	N/A
Gary and Leah visit Amber in rehab, and Farrah goes on a date with her neighbor. Maci tags along on Ryan's family vacation and Catelynn and Tyler question letting Butch move back into their home.
37	5	"Homecoming"	July 10, 2012	N/A
Amber and Gary work on their relationship issues. Maci struggles to choose classes. Visiting her parents, Farrah is annoyed with their concerns for Sophia. Catelynn and her grandmother attend a birth parent support group.
38	6	"Temper Tantrums"	July 17, 2012	N/A
A visit from Farrah's mom and sister leads to a blowup, and Maci enrolls her son Bentley in preschool. Catelynn and Tyler face issues with Butch, while Amber debates leaving rehab early.
39	7	"Fresh Start"	July 24, 2012	N/A
Maci and Ryan clash over Bentley attending preschool. Tyler pressures Catelynn to enroll in college. Farrah begins dating a new guy. After completing two months in rehab, Amber finally heads back home.
40	8	"The Next Step"	July 31, 2012	N/A
Maci and Kyle contemplate buying a house. Farrah introduces Sophia to her new boyfriend. Amber struggles to find a way to see her daughter. A fight between Catelynn and Tyler's parents throw their family future into question.
41	9	"By the Rules"	August 7, 2012	N/A
Farrah introduces her boyfriend to Debra. Catelynn supports her own mom as Tyler's dad goes to court. Bentley has a hard time adjusting to Maci's new house. Amber and Gary continue to struggle with sharing custody of Leah.
42	10	"Change of Plans"	August 14, 2012	N/A
In a visit to Texas, Farrah challenges Daniel about their relationship. Maci and Ryan argue about Ryan's new girlfriend. Amber looks for a new home for her and Leah. Catelynn and Tyler struggle to make a decision about college.
43	11	"For the Best"	August 21, 2012	N/A
Bentley's birthday leads to a blowout between Maci and Ryan. Farrah spends time with Sophia before saying goodbye for a month. Amber and Gary come up with a custody plan for Leah. Catelynn and Tyler help their parents cope.
44	12	"Wake Up"	August 28, 2012	N/A
Amber has second thoughts about giving Gary full custody. Catelynn helps Tyler cope with emotions about his dad and they both reflect on the adoption. Farrah misses Sophia. Ryan confronts Maci about their custody arrangement.

=== Season 5 (2015–16) ===
No. overall	No. in season	Title	Original release date	US viewers (millions)
45	1	"Back and Better than Ever"	March 23, 2015	N/A
Catelynn and Tyler find out they are pregnant so Catelynn wants to get married. Maci struggles co-parenting with Ryan. Amber falls for Gary's flirting, but is crushed when he goes on a family vacation with his new girlfriend and Leah.
46	2	"Back to School"	March 30, 2015	N/A
Catelynn and Tyler plan a party to reveal the gender of their baby. Maci struggles with the fact that Bentley is starting kindergarten. Gary invites Amber to be a part of Leah's first day of kindergarten.
47	3	"Old Wounds"	April 6, 2015	N/A
Tyler posts a video of Carly on their fan page which upsets Brandon and Teresa. Maci continues struggling to communicate with Ryan about co-parenting. Amber is extremely hurt by Gary because he won't let Leah spend the night.
48	4	"New Kids on the Block"	April 13, 2015	N/A
Catelynn finds out Brandon and Teresa want to discuss adoption issues with them. Maci reveals that she and Taylor are expecting a baby. Amber is shocked to find out that Gary is having a baby with Kristina.
49	5	"Surprise Surprise"	April 20, 2015	N/A
Catelynn and Tyler meet with Brandon and Teresa. Maci tells Ryan and his family she's having a baby with Taylor. Amber confronts Gary about his flirting. Farrah is hurt after not being a part of the season from the beginning.
50	6	"The F Bomb"	April 27, 2015	N/A
Catelynn finds out she has gestational diabetes. Farrah struggles with her mom's visit. Amber reveals her relationship with her boyfriend and Maci quits the show when she finds out Farrah is back.
51	7	"First Time for Everything"	May 4, 2015	N/A
Maci surprises the crew with her return to the series but has some conditions regarding Bentley. Catelynn and Tyler struggle with being first time parents. Farrah introduces Simon to her mom.
52	8	"Mom vs. Mom"	May 11, 2015	N/A
Amber, Farrah, Maci and Catelynn come together in New York to do press for the show. The tension between Farrah and the rest of the girls comes to a head when Farrah discovers that Maci had quit the series because of her.
53	9	"Boiling Point"	May 18, 2015	N/A
Tyler puts pressure on Cate to lose her pregnancy weight. Things boil over between Amber and Matt in Vegas. Maci worries about Bentley's safety while in Ryan's care and Debra attempts to go into business with Farrah.
54	10	"Let's Face It"	May 25, 2015	N/A
Amber's family questions Matt's intentions when his past is revealed. Catelynn leaves Nova under April's care. Maci and Taylor find their dream home. Simon meets Sophia and Farrah pressures him for an engagement.
Part 2
55	11	"Why Can't We just Get Along?"	January 4, 2016	N/A
Farrah realizes her relationship with Simon is over. Amber asks Gary for joint custody while Maci invites Ryan to hang out. Tyler's dad Butch is released from prison and meets Nova for the first time.
56	12	"Playing for Keeps"	January 4, 2016	N/A
Farrah asks her mom to watch Sophia for a month, Amber is blindsided when Leah doesn't want to see her and Maci doesn't want Bentley going over to Ryan's parents house every weekend.
57	13	"Party Down"	January 11, 2016	N/A
Farrah is expelled from a Hampton's White Party. Amber struggles with Gary's new visitation schedule for Leah. Catelynn and Tyler have their bachelor/bachelorette parties while Maci is frustrated that Taylor hasn't proposed.
58	14	"Never Say Goodbye"	January 18, 2016	N/A
Farrah struggles with taking Sophia to visit Derek's family. Ryan is annoyed that Maci has all the control over Bentley. Catelynn deals with anxiety when Nova meets Carly.
59	15	"The Big Day"	January 25, 2016	N/A
Catelynn and Tyler get married. Maci and Taylor buy an online t-shirt business while Amber and Matt decide to flip houses. Farrah and Debra argue when Farrah lets her know she doesn't trust her to take care of Sophia.
60	16	"Skeletons in the Closet"	February 1, 2016	N/A
Farrah leaves for a month long business trip and has a last minute change of heart on who can watch Sophia while she is away. Maci and Ryan celebrate Bentley's 7th birthday together while Catelynn has post wedding blues.
61	17	"Forgive & Forget"	February 8, 2016	N/A
Farah returns from her business trip and shares a life changing decision with her parents. Maci and Ryan celebrate Halloween as a family while Catelynn and Tyler go to Hawaii for their honeymoon.
62	18	"Honeymoon Is Over"	February 15, 2016	N/A
Simon comes back into Farrah's life and Catelynn and Tyler are concerned when Butch starts dating. Maci is overwhelmed with life and needs Taylor to step it up and Amber wants to take Leah on a trip but Gary has all the power.
63	19	"Taking Chances"	February 22, 2016	N/A
Farrah and Simon decide to take their relationship to the next level. Maci is annoyed she does all the work for Taylor's t-shirt business while Ryan plans a big move. Cate learns she has postpartum depression.
64	20	"Walk Away"	February 22, 2016	N/A
Maci is shocked that Ryan is stepping up as a father while Cate and Tyler celebrate Nova's first birthday but Butch and April have to be separated. Amber and Gary work out their custody battle over Leah.

=== Season 6 (2016–17) ===
No. overall	No. in season	Title	Original release date	US viewers (millions)
65	1	"Put a Ring on It"	August 22, 2016	N/A
Amber and Gary finally settle their custody dispute over Leah. Farrah plans a move to LA, but questions her relationship with Simon. Catelynn and Tyler debate having another baby.
66	2	"Tweet Tweet"	August 22, 2016	N/A
Farrah's mom confronts Simon at Sophia's 7th birthday party after he posts an old mugshot of her on social media. Amber deals with the latest rumor in the media about Matt.
67	3	"Don't Panic"	August 28, 2016	N/A
Maci and Taylor find out she's further along in her unexpected pregnancy than they thought, Matt takes Amber to his hometown where she meets one of his family members.
68	4	"Animal Instincts"	September 5, 2016	N/A
Maci and Taylor plan their wedding. Leah is hurt after Amber misses a visit with her. Farrah invites Simon to celebrate Easter with her family, and then kicks him out due to his lack of enthusiasm.
69	5	"Hello, Goodbye"	September 12, 2016	N/A
Catelynn and Tyler have an emotional goodbye as she heads to a treatment facility for her anxiety and depression. Maci and Taylor buy a bigger house to fit their growing needs.
70	6	"Second Guessing"	September 19, 2016	N/A
Maci and Taylor question their decision to have their wedding so soon, while Farrah and Simon receive relationship advice from Dr. Jenn. Catelynn is homesick so Tyler and Nova visit her at her treatment facility. Amber moves to an upscale
71	7	"The Long Road Home"	September 26, 2016	N/A
Maci's daughter Jayde turns one and she is worried because Ryan isn't around for Bentley. Farrah makes a big move to LA. Amber and Matt prepare for Leah to stay at their new house, and Catelynn returns from her thirty day stay at a treatment facility.
72	8	"Mother's Day"	October 3, 2016	N/A
Maci and Taylor welcome their third child but still worry that Ryan isn't showing up enough for Bentley. Gary tries to co-parent with Amber. Farrah decides she's ready to move on from Simon, and Tyler attempts to be more sensitive towards Catelynn.
73	9	"The Tipping Point"	October 10, 2016	N/A
Amber worries she's developed a new addiction to food. Farrah decides to open a frozen yogurt shop, while Tyler's concerned that Catelynn is falling back into her old habits. Ryan and his father have a huge fight, causing Maci to worry.
74	10	"Lemons into Lemonade"	October 17, 2016	N/A
Amber and Gary prepare for Leah's first day of school, while Catelynn continues to struggle. Ryan takes Bentley for the weekend and the grand opening of Farrah's frozen yogurt store is made all the more interesting when Simon shows up to help.
75	11	"Surprise Surprise!"	October 24, 2016	N/A
Amber and Matt attempt to put a stop to the tabloid rumors surrounding them, but are sidetracked by a visit from Matt's troubled son while Farrah deals with an employee at FroCo that's not living up to her high standards. Tyler and Catelynn celebrate Butch's first year out of prison, while Taylor and Bentley plan something special for Maci's birthday.
76	12	"The Ties that Bind"	November 7, 2016	N/A
In an attempt to keep Matt's son sober, Amber and Matt invite him to move in. Farrah visits Derek's family, but quickly returns home to deal with her next business venture... and her mom. Catelynn and Tyler attempt to celebrate their first year of marriage, but are worried that they may not see Carly this year; and Maci celebrates at her bridal shower while Ryan tries to apologize to his dad.
77	13	"Ginger's Last Binger"	November 14, 2016	N/A
Farrah and her mother uncover old family wounds and get into a huge fight. Matt is offered the opportunity to write a book about his life, but he and Amber are distracted by the latest tabloid stories.
78	14	"Crazy Gardens"	November 21, 2016	N/A
Gary reluctantly asks Amber for help with Leah when Kristina has a family emergency. Maci gets to know Ryan's new girlfriend better, while Catelynn and Tyler discover they're still not ready to move into their new home.
79	15	"I Do!"	November 28, 2016	N/A
Amber undergoes plastic surgery in an attempt to relieve her depression and negative self image issues, while Farrah and her mom try to reconcile their differences after an awkward encounter with Debra's boyfriend.
Part 2
80	16	"A Fresh Start"	April 17, 2017	N/A
Maci and Ryan try to coordinate trick or treating with Bentley. Amber is excited about her new business venture, but is let down when Gary doesn't let Leah stay with her on a school night.
81	17	"Hello Again World!"	April 24, 2017	N/A
Tyler's less optimistic than usual when his dad is once again released from prison. Farrah and Simon consider the status of their relationship. Maci throws Bentley a birthday party.
82	18	"Lil' Starburst"	May 1, 2017	N/A
Catelynn and Tyler celebrate Nova's birthday and consider having another baby, while Farrah makes a big decision about her and Sophia's future. Amber works with Gary to throw Leah a birthday party.
83	19	"Blue Christmas"	May 7, 2017	N/A
Amber continues to be frustrated that she doesn't spend as much time as she wants with Leah. Ryan's girlfriend encourages him to communicate more with Maci about Bentley's schedule. Catelynn surprises Tyler with a winter getaway.
84	20	"Let's Try to Get Along"	May 8, 2017	N/A
Maci confides in Ryan's fiance Mackenzie about her co-parenting issues while Amber plans a fashion show to promote her online boutique. Catelynn and Tyler come to terms with their different parenting styles.
85	21	"The Forever Knot"	May 15, 2017	N/A
Tyler decides to be more optimistic about Butch's recovery while Farrah questions her mom's relationship with her fiance. Ryan's family finds out that Maci doesn't want Bentley going over to Jen and Larry's house and Amber has doubts about marrying Matt.
86	22	"Viva Las Vegas"	May 22, 2017	N/A
Maci is worried about Ryan's extracurricular activities while Catelynn and Tyler start an online children's boutique. Farrah works on her relationship with her mom through hypnotherapy while Amber and Matt almost elope in Vegas.
87	23	"Making Waves"	May 29, 2017	N/A
Amber, Maci, Catelynn and their significant others travel to Puerto Rico and Maci struggles with wanting to help Ryan overcome his issues. Farrah is invited to speak about her three businesses at SXSW.
88	24	"Love in La La Land"	June 5, 2017	N/A
Maci and Taylor work on their marriage in counseling while Farrah goes on a date with Asaf whom she picked on the aftershow. Gary asks Amber to help him surprise Leah with a new house.
89	25	"Friday the Thirteenth"	June 12, 2017	N/A
Catelynn and Tyler sign Nova up for daycare while Maci throws a surprise birthday party for Taylor. Simon gets hypnotized to get over Farrah while Amber and Matt lock their wedding venue.
90	26	"We Are Family"	June 19, 2017	N/A
Amber celebrates Easter with Gary but then is disappointed when another cheating scandal comes out about Matt. Catelynn and Tyler find their dream home while Farrah makes an effort to get to know her mom's fiancé.
91	27	"Truth Be Told"	June 26, 2017	N/A
While on a family vacation in Key West, Farrah and her mom's fiance David argue over their lack of respect for each other. Catelynn and Tyler's offer on their dream home is accepted. Maci tries to confront Ryan.

=== Season 7 (2017–18) ===
No. overall	No. in season	Title	Original release date	US viewers (millions)
92	1	"Icing on the Cake of Lies"	November 27, 2017	N/A
Amber loses her cool with Ryan's wife. Maci wants Ryan to complete rehab or she'll keep Bentley away. Catelynn worries about Tyler's dad Butch since he's off parole. Farrah celebrates her birthday in New York, while Amber calls off their engagement.
93	2	"This Is Gonna End Badly"	December 4, 2017	N/A
Amber leans on her family while she figures out what to do about Matt. Ryan completes rehab early and demands to see Bentley. Catelynn worries if she beomes pregnant again she'll have postpartum depression. Farrah looks for a home in Los Angeles.
94	3	"Too Shady"	December 4, 2017	N/A
Farrah goes to Las Vegas for a girls trip and her ex-boyfriend Simon shows up. Catelynn and Tyler hurry to prepare for the launch of their children's clothing line. Maci lets Bentley see Ryan on Father's Day, while Amber kicks Matt out.
95	4	"System Overload"	December 11, 2017	N/A
Maci wants Ryan to pass a drug test before he can see Bentley. Farrah travels abroad for work and leaves Sophia in Michael's care. Catelynn and Tyler launch their kids clothing line but run into issues. Amber and Matt try to save their relationship.
96	5	"High Hopes"	December 18, 2017	N/A
Farrah plans a family trip to Italy. Bentley starts third grade and Maci is still determined to keep him away from Ryan until he passes a drug test. Amber is depressed after breaking up with Matt. Catelynn and Tyler finally get a date to visit Carly.
97	6	"What a Ride"	January 1, 2018	N/A
Amber is completely done with Matt and starts dating a new guy. Farrah visits Omaha and Sophia expresses her dislike for Deb's fiancé, David. Taylor surprises Maci and takes her skydiving. Catelynn and Tyler finally get to see Carly.
98	7	"Runways, Rehab, and Retail"	January 8, 2018	N/A
Amber and Catelynn unite at MTV's Video Music Awards. Tyler struggles with Butch's drug use. Farrah and Sophia model at NY fashion week. Maci and Taylor get an office for their business. Ryan is clean but Mackenzie still worries he may relapse.
99	8	"Oh Baby!"	January 15, 2018	N/A
Catelynn removes her birth control and doesn't tell Tyler. Farrah goes on a family vacation to Italy. Ryan and Mackenzie have a joint bachelor and bachelorette party. Maci learns Taylor is not invited to the wedding. Amber finds out she is pregnant.
100	9	"Let's Try Again"	January 22, 2018	N/A
Farrah helps Michael plan his proposal. Catelynn freaks out at a photo shoot and Tyler is overwhelmed with renovations and launching the fall line. Maci and Taylor celebrate their one-year wedding anniversary. Amber is excited about her pregnancy.
101	10	"Fertile Myrtle"	January 29, 2018	N/A
Amber shocks her whole family when she reveals she's pregnant. Bentley turns 9 and Maci allows him to spend time with Ryan. Deb tries to persuade Sophia to go to her wedding. Catelynn secretly removed her IUD and has a big surprise for Tyler.
102	11	"Unconfuse Your Brain"	February 12, 2018	N/A
Amber and Andrew have a disagreement. Ryan is furious at Maci when she shows up late to trick-or-treat. Farrah is shocked when she finds out who Deb invited to her wedding. Catelynn surprises her family with her pregnancy.
103	12	"Something Blue"	February 19, 2018	N/A
Amber has big news for Leah. Farrah gets vaginal rejuvenation and lashes out at her producer. Catelynn spends quality time with Nova while Tyler gets emotional dropping Butch off at rehab. Maci and Taylor attend Ryan and Mackenzie's wedding.
104	13	"I'm Beautiful, I'm Smart, I'm Strong"	February 26, 2018	N/A
Amber spends quality time with Leah while Gary gets a paternity test to determine whether Jody is his father. Maci meets with a doctor to find new ways to manage her Polycystic Ovary Syndrome. Executive Producer Morgan heads to Austin to see Farrah.
105	14	"Choose Your Path"	March 12, 2018	N/A
Tyler has a hard time running his business and taking care of Nova by himself. Maci trains to participate on another show. Amber starts preparing the nursery while Gary gets the paternity test results. Executive Producer Morgan speaks with Farrah. Last Appearances of: Farrah and Sophia
106	15	"Keep Chugging Away"	March 19, 2018	N/A
Amber takes Leah on vacation to Florida. Taylor takes Bentley on a boys trip to Jacksonville to visit their new clothing warehouse. Mackenzie enrolls in college and talks about kids with Ryan. Tyler and Nova visit Catelynn at her treatment facility.
107	16	"Friends in Need"	March 26, 2018	N/A
Amber is angry at Gary and Kristina for saying she is a bad mother. Tyler struggles to keep their clothing business up and running while dealing with his dad and wife being in rehab. Maci visits Catelynn at her treatment facility.
108	17	"Time Will Tell"	April 2, 2018	N/A
Maci and Taylor meet with an adoption counselor. Tyler and his sister Amber have an emotional reunion with their dad Butch when they visit him in rehab. Amber gives her cousin Krystal advice about co-parenting while Mackenzie and Ryan have big news.
109	18	"One Life to Live"	April 9, 2018	N/A
Maci finds out from Bentley that Ryan and Mackenzie are expecting a baby. Amber is hurt when Leah chooses to sleepover at a friends house instead of spending time with her. Catelynn returns home but quickly admits herself again.
Part 2
110	19	"Welcome to the Family"	October 1, 2018	N/A
Bristol and Cheyenne join the Teen Mom family, Maci and Taylor deal with Ryan's threats, Tyler cares for Nova while Catelynn's in rehab, and Amber gives birth to a baby boy.
111	20	"Unconditional Love"	October 8, 2018	N/A
Maci has an uncomfortable custody handoff with Ryan’s mom, Cheyenne’s father finds out she’s living with Zach, and Dakota feels emotionally alienated from Bristol.
112	21	"Suns Out, Buns Out"	October 15, 2018	N/A
Cheyenne causes a scene, Catelynn and Tyler visit Dr. Oz, Bristol moves forward with her divorce, Maci shares her story in Washington, D.C., and Amber travels to L.A.
113	22	"Making Amends"	October 22, 2018	N/A
Bristol lets Tripp go to Alaska with Levi, Tyler visits his dad in rebab, Gary and Kristina take Leah to visit Amber in L.A., and Maci learn that Ryan has been arrested.
114	23	"Mama Bear"	October 29, 2018	N/A
Cheyenne worries about Ryder's health condition, Tyler and Catelynn pick up the pieces after his sister checks in to rehab, and Bristol struggles to co-parent with Dakota.
115	24	"Back to Square One"	November 5, 2018	N/A
Catelynn and Tyler celebrate Carly's birthday from afar, Bristol fights with Dakota after her family's stalker breaks into his home, and Cheyenne gets back together with Zach.
116	25	"New G's Meet the Old G's"	November 12, 2018	N/A
As the mothers finally get to know one another and put their nervousness to rest, Gary starts to lose hope in finding his biological dad, and Tyler refuses to forgive his sister.
117	26	"Roll with the Punches"	November 19, 2018	N/A
Cheyenne struggles to see eye to eye with Zach, Andrew urges Amber to step into the ring for a charity boxing event, and Bristol makes co-parenting strides with Tripp’s dad.
118	27	"I Choose You"	November 26, 2018	N/A
Catelynn and Tyler find out they're expecting another baby, Cheyenne visits Cory's family in Michigan, and Maci and Taylor move into a new home.
119	28	"Modern Families"	December 3, 2018	N/A
Maci tries to improve relations with her ex for their kids’ sake, Bristol grows concerned about Tripp and Dakota’s relationship, and Cheyenne and Cory become godparents.
120	29	"Mixed Feelings"	December 10, 2018	N/A
Catelynn worries her separation from Tyler could lead to divorce, Cory becomes jealous of Cheyenne’s ex during her birthday party, and Maci’s daughter needs surgery.
121	30	"Eye to Eye"	December 17, 2018	N/A
Catelynn visits Amber as her separation from Tyler approaches, Bristol gets advice from a PTSD counselor, Cheyenne and Cory get closer, and Maci meets with Ryan's parents.

=== Season 8 (2019–20) ===
No. overall	No. in season	Title	Original release date	US viewers (millions)
122	1	"Walking On Eggshells"	June 10, 2019	N/A
Catelynn and Tyler work out their differences, Cheyenne disapproves of Cory's girlfriend. Maci is wary about speaking with Ryan. Amber discusses her spat with Jenelle.
123	2	"The Wind Picked Up"	June 10, 2019	N/A
Maci tells Bentley about Ryan's arrest, and Cheyenne doesn't think Cory understands the complexities of Ryder's genetic disorder.
124	3	"Blessing, Not Baggage"	June 17, 2019	N/A
Catelynn gives birth, Maci and Taylor take Maverick to a speech pathologist. Amber and Andrew head to L.A., and Cheyenne is dating someone new.
125	4	"One Big Happy Family"	June 24, 2019	N/A
Cheyenne worries about introducing her new boyfriend to Cory, Catelynn buys Nova a pony to ease her transition to older sibling. Maci prepare for Ryan's release.
126	5	"Baby Fever"	July 1, 2019	N/A
Ryan returns home after spending 90 days in jail and Maci is disappointed he doesn’t make more of an effort with Bentley. Cheyenne relationship with her new boyfriend Matt is getting serious, but Cory is shocked when he finds out they want to have a baby.
127	6	"Momcation"	July 8, 2019	N/A
The ladies take their first girls' trip together in 10 years to Florida. Catelynn breaks the news to Nova who doesn't take it well; Maci plans a birthday surprise for Amber at a drag show.
128	7	"Mother of a Mother's Day"	July 15, 2019	N/A
Catelynn celebrates Mother's Day at home while Tyler visits his sister in Texas and discovers that Butch has relapsed; Maci goes to Washington to advocate for PCOS; Cheyenne is shocked at Cory's girlfriend's behavior.
129	8	"Don't Give Up"	July 22, 2019	N/A
Amber and Gary discuss how to handle Leah’s panic attacks. Cheyenne questions Cory’s priorities when he goes on vacation with Taylor at the same time that his mom comes to town to visit. Maci throws Taylor a surprise 30th birthday party.
130	9	"Ready When You Are"	July 29, 2019	N/A
As Maci comes to the end of her birth control, she suggests Taylor get a vasectomy. When social media explodes after Tyler goes out with friends in Arizona, Catelynn has a night out on the town with her girlfriends. Cheyenne goes to Baltimore.
131	10	"Father's Day Follies"	August 5, 2019	N/A
Maci and Taylor take the family to Atlanta for Bentley's baseball tournament and Ryan makes a surprise appearance; Cheyenne's father grills Matt about his unconditional love.
132	11	"Handle with Care"	August 12, 2019	N/A
Amber feels she's at a breaking point with Andrew; Cheyenne takes a trip to wine country with Matt and Ryder to test out if he can handle parenting Ryder; Mackenzie tries to prepare for a fitness competition; Josh goes missing.
133	12	"The Weight of the World"	August 19, 2019	N/A
Cheyenne confronts Cory's girlfriend, Taylor, about her past racist tweets, while Maci takes Bentley to see a counselor to help him process everything that has gone on with Ryan. Mackenzie receives devastating news about her mother's cancer.
Part 2
134	13	"Decisions, Decisions"	March 17, 2020	N/A
135	14	"Everyother Day Mom"	March 24, 2020	N/A
136	15	"Not Going Down Without a Fight"	March 31, 2020	N/A
137	16	"To the Rescue"	April 7, 2020	N/A
138	17	"This Has All Been Hell"	April 14, 2020	N/A
139	18	"Walk Into the Flame"	April 21, 2020	N/A
140	19	"Goodbye for Now"	April 28, 2020	N/A
141	20	"I Am Not Okay"	May 5, 2020	N/A
142	21	"Hanging On by a Thread"	May 12, 2020	N/A
143	22	"Time for a Talk"	May 19, 2020	N/A
144	23	"Piece the Pieces Together"	May 26, 2020	N/A
145	24	"In a Perfect World"	June 2, 2020	N/A

=== Season 9 (2021) ===
No. overall	No. in season	Title	Original release date	US viewers (millions)
146	1	"Surviving Together"	January 26, 2021	N/A
147	2	"Just Do You"	February 2, 2021	N/A
148	3	"Patience is Patience"	February 9, 2021	N/A
149	4	"Lose My Mind"	February 16, 2021	N/A
150	5	"Orchard of Dreams"	February 23, 2021	N/A
151	6	"Hearts on Fire"	March 2, 2021	N/A
152	7	"In My Bubble"	March 9, 2021	N/A
153	8	"Better Days Are Coming"	March 16, 2021	N/A
154	9	"Where Do We Go From Here?"	March 23, 2021	N/A
155	10	"Half-Wounded Parent"	March 30, 2021	N/A
156	11	"The Waiting Game"	April 6, 2021	N/A
157	12	"Light the Way"	April 13, 2021	N/A
Part 2
158	13	"Don't Give Up on Me"	September 7, 2021	0.40
159	14	"A Day Late and a Dollar Short"	September 14, 2021	0.59
160	15	"Agree to Disagree"	September 21, 2021	0.45
161	16	"Flying By the Seat of Our Pants"	September 28, 2021	0.56
162	17	"The Innermost Inside"	October 5, 2021	0.52
163	18	"Proceed With Caution"	October 12, 2021	0.46
164	19	"Balancing Act"	October 19, 2021	0.41
165	20	"The Here & Now"	October 26, 2021	0.48
166	21	"Just Be Present"	November 2, 2021	0.42
167	22	"Helpful not Helpless"	November 9, 2021	0.41
168	23	"Home Is Where the Heart Is"	November 16, 2021	0.39
169	24	"Give Yourself Some Grace"	November 23, 2021	0.47

== Specials ==
Featured season	Title	Original release date
1	"Catching Up with 16 and Pregnant: The Girls of Teen Mom"	December 1, 2009
1	"Check Up with Dr. Drew"	February 2, 2010
1	"Unseen Moments"	February 9, 2010
2	"Unseen Moments"	October 11, 2010
2	"Check Up with Dr. Drew"	October 19, 2010
2	"Baby Talk"	October 19, 2010
3	"Teen Dads"	September 18, 2011
3	"Check Up with Dr. Drew, Part 1"	September 27, 2011
3	"Check Up with Dr. Drew, Part 2"	October 4, 2011
3	"Unseen Moments"	October 4, 2011
4	"Catching Up with the Girls of Teen Mom"	May 29, 2012
4	"Check Up with Dr. Drew, Part 1"	September 4, 2012
4	"Check Up with Dr. Drew, Part 2"	September 11, 2012
4	"Unseen Moments"	September 18, 2012
4	"Farewell"	October 2, 2012
4	"Amber Behind the Bars"	October 9, 2012
4	"Ask the Moms"	October 9, 2012
4	"Being Maci"	August 18, 2013
4	"Being Farrah"	February 23, 2014
4	"Being Catelynn"	February 23, 2014
4	"Being Amber"	February 23, 2014
4	"Being Dad"	June 8, 2014
5a	"Getting to Know Catelynn"	February 21, 2015
5a	"Getting to Know Amber"	February 21, 2015
5a	"Getting to Know Maci"	February 21, 2015
5a	"Getting to Know Farrah"	February 21, 2015
5a	"Catch Up Special"	March 16, 2015
5a	"A Closer Look"	March 30, 2015
5a	"Check Up with Dr. Drew, Part 1"	June 1, 2015
5a	"Check Up with Dr. Drew, Part 2"	June 8, 2015
5a	"Unseen Moments"	June 15, 2015
5b	"Behind the Cameras"	December 28, 2015
5b	"Check Up with Dr. Drew, Part 1"	February 29, 2016
5b	"Check Up with Dr. Drew, Part 2"	March 7, 2016
5b	"Unseen Moments"	July 14, 2016
6a	"Catch Up Special"	August 15, 2016
6a	"Being Butch"	July 18, 2016
6a	"Ask the Moms"	November 21, 2016
6a	"Check Up with Dr. Drew, Part 1"	November 28, 2016
6a	"100 Things About Teen Mom OG"	December 4, 2016
6a	"Check Up with Dr. Drew, Part 2"	December 5, 2016
6a	"Unseen Moments"	December 12, 2016
6b	"Being the Edwards"	February 8, 2017
6b	"Being Debra"	February 15, 2017
6b	"Being Matt"	April 10, 2017
6b	"Catch Up Special"	April 10, 2017
6b	"Unseen Moments"	June 19, 2017
6b	"Check Up with Dr. Drew, Part 1"	July 3, 2017
6b	"Check Up with Dr. Drew, Part 2"	July 10, 2017
6b	"Ask the Moms"	July 10, 2017
6b	"Being Simon"	October 11, 2017
6b	"That's a Wrap 2017"	December 25, 2017
7a	"Being Gary"	February 20, 2018
7a	"Check Up with Dr. Drew, Part 1"	April 16, 2018
7a	"Check Up with Dr. Drew, Part 2"	April 23, 2018
7a	"Unseen Moments"	April 30, 2018
7a	"Not-So-Happily Every After"	July 2, 2018
7a	"All the Times Teen Mom Broke the Internet"	July 23, 2018
7b	"Ask the Moms"	September 10, 2018
7b	"Law and Disorder"	September 12, 2018
7b	"Where Are They Now? Mackenzie McKee"	September 19, 2018
7b	"The New Moms"	September 24, 2018
7b	"Cheaters"	September 26, 2018
7b	"Check Up with Dr. Drew, Part 1"	December 24, 2018
7b	"Check Up with Dr. Drew, Part 2"	December 31, 2018
7b	"Unseen Moments"	January 1, 2019
7b	"Backstage Pass"	January 7, 2019
7b	"Mugshot Mayhem"	January 15, 2019
7b	"Maci & Taylor, A Love Story"	January 21, 2019
8a	"Being Cory"	April 1, 2019
8a	"Being Dakota"	April 16, 2019
8a	"Being Levi"	May 27, 2019
8a	"Check Up with Dr. Drew, Part 1"	September 2, 2019
8a	"Check Up with Dr. Drew, Part 2"	September 3, 2019
8a	"Unseen Moments"	September 3, 2019
8a	"At Home: Cory & Taylor's Baby Special"	Unaired
9a	"Check Up with Dr. Drew, Part 1"	April 20, 2021
9a	"Check Up with Dr. Drew, Part 2"	April 27, 2021
9b	"Check Up with Dr. Drew, Part 1"	November 30, 2021
9b	"Check Up with Dr. Drew, Part 2"	December 7, 2021
