= Mackenzie McKee =

Teen Mom cast member

Mackenzie Hall
- Born: October 17, 1994 (age 31); Miami, Oklahoma, U.S.
- Occupation: Television personality
- Years active: 2011–2013, 2018–2021, 2024
- Television: 16 and Pregnant; Teen Mom 3; Teen Mom OG; Teen Mom: The Next Chapter
- Spouse: Josh McKee (m. 2013; div. 2022)
- Partner(s): Khesanio Hall (2023–present; engaged)
- Children: 5
- Parent(s): Angie and Brad Douthit

Mackenzie Douthit (born October 17, 1994) is an American reality television personality from Miami, Oklahoma. She received public attention after being cast in the reality television series 16 and Pregnant in 2011, which documented the pregnancies and first months of motherhood for several young women. Later that year she was cast in the spin-off series Teen Mom 3 and appeared in its first and only season of that show, alongside Briana DeJesus, Alex Sekella and Katie Yeager, in 2013. McKee joined the cast of Teen Mom OG following the departure of Bristol Palin from the show in August 2019.

== Personal life ==
Mackenzie Douthit was born in Miami, Oklahoma, to Angie and Brad Douthit.

Douthit became pregnant with her first child with then-boyfriend, Josh McKee, and gave birth to their son, Gannon Dewayne McKee, on September 12, 2011. Douthit and McKee married on August 17, 2013.

The McKees welcomed their second child, a girl, named Jaxie Taylor, on February 7, 2014. The couple's third child, another son Broncs Weston, was born on August 15, 2016. Mackenzie's mother, Angie Douthit, died of lung cancer on December 5, 2019. On July 26, 2022, Douthit announced she and McKee had separated.

In May 2024, she announced her engagement with Jamaican soccer player Khesanio Hall. On March 31, 2025, McKee announced that she is expecting twins with Khesanio Hall. On June 2, 2025, their daughters were born.
