= Teen Mom: Young and Pregnant =

American reality television series

- Genre: Reality
- Starring: Jade Cline; Brianna Jaramillo; Ashley Jones; Kayla Sessler; Lexi Tatman; Rachel Beaver; Kiaya Elliott; Madisen Beith; Kayla Jones
- Country of origin: United States
- Original language: English
- No. of seasons: 3
- No. of episodes: 68

Production
- Executive producers: Morgan J. Freeman; Dia Sokol Savage; Larry Musnik; Kendra MacLeod; Lauren Dolgen

Original release
- Network: MTV
- Release: March 12, 2018 – September 13, 2022

Related
- 16 and Pregnant; Teen Mom; Teen Mom 2; Teen Mom 3; Teen Mom: Family Reunion; Teen Mom: Young Moms Club

Teen Mom: Young and Pregnant (stylised as Teen Mom: Young + Pregnant) is an American reality television series that premiered on March 12, 2018 on MTV. It is a spinoff of the Teen Mom franchise, which itself is a spinoff of MTV's 16 and Pregnant series. Teen Mom: Young + Pregnant is a docuseries similar to the original 16 and Pregnant format. It follows the lives of different teenage moms including: Brianna Jaramillo, Kayla Sessler, Rachel Beaver, Kiaya Elliott, Madisen Beith and formerly Lexi Tatman, Jade Cline, Ashley Jones, and Kayla Jones as they go through pregnancy and become young mothers.

== Production ==
On June 27, 2018, the show's first season was extended to include a B season, that began airing on October 15 and concluded on December 17, 2018. On January 10, 2019, the series was renewed for a second season that would feature two new moms. On January 25, 2019, it was announced that Lexi was cut from the second season and is being replaced by a new girl, Kiaya from Virginia. On May 7, 2019, it was announced that Jade Cline was moving to Teen Mom 2, replacing Jenelle Evans.

On September 24, 2019, it was announced that the second season would premiere on October 22, 2019. It also was confirmed that two new moms, Rachel Beaver and Kiaya Elliott, would be joining the cast to replace Cline and Tatman.

In December 2020, it was announced that Ashley Jones would be moving to Teen Mom 2 to replace Chelsea Houska. In May 2021, it was announced that 16 and Pregnant star Madisen Beith would replace Ashley Jones in the third season. Another new cast member named Kayla Jones was also announced as a new cast member for the third season, which premiered on September 7, 2021.

On January 31, 2022, it was announced that Kayla Jones was cut from the second half of the third season with Madisen becoming a full time cast member.

In 2023, the series was canceled after three seasons.

== Cast ==
=== Jade Cline ===
Jade Cline (from Indianapolis, Indiana) is the mother of Kloie Kenna Austin who was born on September 18, 2017. The father is her then-boyfriend Sean Austin. The couple split in February 2019. They have since reconciled and became engaged in Summer 2022. On October 6, 2023, Jade Cline married Sean Austin.

=== Brianna Jaramillo ===
Brianna Jaramillo (from Portland, Oregon) is the mother of Braeson Messiah Jaramillo who was born on August 26, 2017. In season 1b, Brianna moved from Milwaukee, Wisconsin to Portland, Oregon. Brianna began a relationship with Robert Reams in early 2018 but ended the relationship in October 2018.

=== Kayla Sessler ===
Kayla Sessler (from DeKalb, Illinois) is the mother of Izaiah Cole Sessler (né Alexander) who was born on September 30, 2017. The father is her ex-boyfriend Stephan Alexander. In February 2019, Kayla announced she was pregnant with her second child, a girl, due in August 2019. The father of her second child is her boyfriend Luke Davis. On August 16, 2019, Kayla gave birth to daughter Ariah Jordynn Davis. On March 13, 2024, Kayla gave birth to her third child, a son Zyaire Jaxon Leigh. The father of Zyaire is Kayla's boyfriend Ryan Leigh. On September 18, 2025, Kayla announced that she is pregnant with her fourth child with boyfriend Ryan Leigh. On November 28, 2025, Kayla gave birth to their fourth child, another son born in October 7.

=== Ashley Jones ===
Ashley Jones (from Vallejo, California) is the mother of Holly Isabella Lockett who was born on September 15, 2017. The father is her husband, Bariki "Bar" Smith.

=== Lexi Lopez née Tatman ===
Alexis "Lexi" Lopez (from Montrose, Colorado) is the mother of Tobias Ryker Lopez-DeLuna who was born on October 29, 2017. On August 26, 2019, Lexi announced via Instagram that she had given birth to another baby boy, Jay Wolfe. The father is her now husband Kyler Lopez. On August 16, 2026, Lexi gave birth to their third child, a daughter named Sophia June Lopez.

=== Rachel Beaver ===
Rachel Beaver (from Madisonville, Tennessee) got pregnant while seeing both her on-and-off boyfriend Drew and his best friend Jacob. On 22 February 2019, Rachel gave birth to her daughter, Hazelee. On January 12, 2024, Rachel gave birth to her second child, River Elliott Valentine Houp.

=== Kiaya Elliott ===
Kiaya Elliott (from Norfolk, Virginia) got pregnant after her girlfriend, Teazha cheated on her. X'Zayveon is the father of her child. Teazha moved in and offered her help in raising her child Amour Elliot.

=== Madisen Beith ===
Madisen Beith (from Heber Springs, Arkansas) was 17 years old when she gave birth to her and Christien's daughter Camille Victoria.

=== Kayla Jones ===
Kayla Jones (from Laurel, Maryland) welcomed daughter Mecca with her best friend Makel. Kayla is upset because, since their relationship ended, Makel keeps bringing new girlfriends around their daughter.

=== Timeline of cast members ===
Cast member	Seasons			
Cast member	1	2	3a	3b
Jade Cline	Main			
Brianna Jaramillo	Main	Main	Main	Main
Kayla Sessler	Main	Main	Main	Main
Ashley Jones	Main	Main		
Lexi Tatman	Main			
Rachel Beaver			Main	Main
Kiaya Elliott			Main	Main
Madisen Beith			Recurring	Main
Kayla Jones			Recurring	Guest

== Episodes ==
=== Series overview ===
Season	Episodes		Originally released	
Season	Episodes		First released	Last released
1	26	14	March 12, 2018	June 11, 2018
1	26	12	October 15, 2018	December 17, 2018
2	18		October 22, 2019	February 25, 2020
3	24	12	September 7, 2021	November 23, 2021
3	24	12	June 28, 2022	September 13, 2022

=== Season 1 (2018) ===
No. overall	No. in season	Title	Original release date	U.S. viewers (millions)
1	1	"Eyes on Me"	March 12, 2018	0.66
2	2	"Baby Shower Blowup"	March 19, 2018	0.60
3	3	"It's a Baby, Not a Toy"	March 26, 2018	0.53
4	4	"Cutting the Cord"	April 2, 2018	0.59
5	5	"Parenting 101"	April 9, 2018	0.71
6	6	"Co-Parent Trap"	April 16, 2018	0.68
7	7	"Tying the...Not"	April 23, 2018	0.70
8	8	"Leaving the Nest"	April 30, 2018	0.60
9	9	"Lounder Than Words"	May 7, 2018	0.85
10	10	"When Right Feels Wrong"	May 14, 2018	0.81
11	11	"Pomp and Circumstance"	May 21, 2018	0.90
12	12	"Out with the Old, In with the New"	May 28, 2018	0.67
13	13	"Moving Too Fast"	June 4, 2018	0.83
14	14	"For Now"	June 11, 2018	0.87
Part 2
15	15	"Live Fast, Dye Young"	October 15, 2018	0.64
16	16	"Stay in Your Lane"	October 15, 2018	0.49
17	17	"Decisions, Decisions"	October 22, 2018	0.60
18	18	"Dreams & Nightmares"	October 29, 2018	0.57
19	19	"The High Road"	November 5, 2018	0.50
20	20	"Our Past Is Our Past"	November 12, 2018	0.55
21	21	"Battling Demons"	November 19, 2018	0.49
22	22	"No Winners"	November 26, 2018	0.56
23	23	"Now What?"	December 3, 2018	0.58
24	24	"One Day You'll Thank Me"	December 10, 2018	0.55
25	25	"Babies Have It Made"	December 10, 2018	0.40
26	26	"What Comes Next"	December 17, 2018	0.57

=== Season 2 (2019–20) ===
No. overall	No. in season	Title	Original release date	U.S. viewers (millions)
27	1	"Three Plus Two"	October 22, 2019	0.41
28	2	"Mutual Place"	October 22, 2019	0.35
29	3	"No Going Back"	October 29, 2019	0.40
30	4	"Real Recognize Real"	November 5, 2019	0.41
31	5	"Ball Is in Your Court"	November 12, 2019	0.44
32	6	"That Perfect Family"	November 19, 2019	0.45
33	7	"Unconvenient"	November 26, 2019	0.48
34	8	"Beyond Calm"	December 3, 2019	0.41
35	9	"I Deserve My Happiness"	December 10, 2019	0.46
36	10	"Don't Feel Bad For Me"	December 17, 2019	0.37
37	11	"History Repeats Itself"	January 7, 2020	0.40
38	12	"Too Low to Let Go"	January 14, 2020	0.38
39	13	"Can't Back Out Now"	January 21, 2020	0.35
40	14	"Looking for Signs"	January 28, 2020	0.35
41	15	"Not Gonna Be Like That Again"	February 4, 2020	0.51
42	16	"Out of My Comfort Zone"	February 11, 2020	0.44
43	17	"Where Do You Go From Here?"	February 18, 2020	0.40
44	18	"Putting Myself First"	February 25, 2020	0.47

=== Season 3 (2021–22) ===
No. overall	No. in season	Title	Original release date	U.S. viewers (millions)
45	1	"Long Time No See"	September 7, 2021	0.26
46	2	"High Noon"	September 14, 2021	0.33
47	3	"Grandmama Drama"	September 21, 2021	0.33
48	4	"Family Ties"	September 28, 2021	0.26
49	5	"All About Adjustments"	October 5, 2021	0.16
50	6	"Ups and Downs"	October 12, 2021	0.18
51	7	"Last Minute Attempt"	October 19, 2021	0.22
52	8	"Back To Reality"	October 26, 2021	0.20
53	9	"New Dude, New Mood"	November 2, 2021	0.20
54	10	"Come Correct"	November 9, 2021	0.20
55	11	"Emergency Contact"	November 16, 2021	0.20
56	12	"Two Steps Forward, One Step Back"	November 23, 2021	0.21
Part 2
57	13	"California Love"	June 28, 2022	0.16
58	14	"Family Matters"	July 5, 2022	0.28
59	15	"We Are The Adults"	July 12, 2022	0.20
60	16	"He Love Me!"	July 19, 2022	0.21
61	17	"They Were Together"	July 26, 2022	0.23
62	18	"Out of the Blue"	August 2, 2022	N/A
63	19	"The Next Step"	August 9, 2022	N/A
64	20	"Relationship Woes"	August 16, 2022	N/A
65	21	"Happy Birthday Hazelee!"	August 23, 2022	N/A
66	22	"Girls Just Wanna Have Fun"	August 30, 2022	N/A
67	23	"The Point of No Return"	September 6, 2022	0.17
68	24	"New Beginnings"	September 13, 2022	0.15

== Specials ==
Featured season	Title	Original release date	U.S. viewers (millions)
1	"Young and Pregnant: Meet The New Moms"	March 5, 2018	0.46
1	"Reunion"	June 25, 2018	0.82
2	"In Between the Tweets"	October 8, 2018	0.39
2	"Reunion"	December 31, 2018	0.22
2	"Being Danae"	April 8, 2019	0.33
