= Teen Mom: Young Moms Club =

American reality television series

- Also known as: Pretty Little Mamas
- Genre: Reality television
- Opening theme: "California" by Dzeko feat. Brynn Elliott "Count on You" by Paperwhite
- Country of origin: United States
- Original language: English
- No. of seasons: 1
- No. of episodes: 6

Production
- Executive producers: Sean Bjordal; Rebecca Michelson
- Camera setup: Multiple
- Running time: 41–48 minutes

Original release
- Network: MTV
- Release: August 30, 2018 – May 20, 2019

Related
- Teen Mom; Teen Mom 2; Teen Mom 3; Teen Mom: Young and Pregnant

Teen Mom: Young Moms Club is an American reality television series on MTV. It premiered on August 30, 2018 as Pretty Little Mamas before being pulled and retooled under the Teen Mom franchise name in 2019.

Pretty Little Mamas followed the lives of five young moms who also happen to be close friends as they learn to struggle with life, love, parenthood, and careers. Pretty Little Mamas premiered to only 440,000 viewers and aired only two episodes and a preview episode before being taken off the air. The show was retooled in 2019 and added a new cast member.

== Cast ==
- Alyssa Abrenica
- Chandlar Walby
- Cheyenne Latu
- Nicole Pleskow
- Nikki Hussey
- Heather Miinch

== Episodes ==
=== As Pretty Little Mamas (2018) ===
No.	Title	Original release date	U.S. viewers (millions)
1	"Let's Pretend"	August 30, 2018	0.44
2	"Short and Sweet"	September 6, 2018	0.32

=== As Teen Mom: Young Moms Club (2019) ===
No.	Title	Original release date	U.S. viewers (millions)
1	"On the Fence"	April 22, 2019	0.30
2	"Out of Chances"	April 29, 2019	0.35
3	"You Choose Him Over Us"	May 6, 2019	0.27
4	"Fix Me"	May 13, 2019	0.36
5	"Forget He Exists"	May 20, 2019	0.28
6	"Take it Down a Notch"	May 20, 2019	0.21
