= Teen Mom 3 =

American reality television series

- Genre: Reality
- Created by: Lauren Dolgen
- Starring: Briana DeJesus; Mackenzie Douthit; Alex Sekella; Katie Yeager
- Country of origin: United States
- Original language: English
- No. of seasons: 1
- No. of episodes: 15

Production
- Executive producers: Andrew Portnoy; Dia Sokol Savage; Janay Dutton; Jessica Zalkind; Kendra MacLeod; Lauren Dolgen; Morgan J. Freeman; Nick Predescu; Sara Cohen
- Camera setup: Multiple
- Running time: 42 minutes
- Production company: 11th Street Productions

Original release
- Network: MTV
- Release: August 26 – November 18, 2013

Related
- 16 and Pregnant; Teen Mom; Teen Mom 2; Teen Mom: Young and Pregnant; Teen Mom: Young Moms Club

Teen Mom 3 is an American reality television series that premiered on August 26, 2013, on MTV and concluded its run on November 18, 2013. It chronicles the lives of four girls from the fourth season of 16 and Pregnant as they navigate their first year of motherhood and changing social relationships. The series was announced on February 27, 2012, as the third installment of the Teen Mom franchise, coming one day before Teen Mom 2 concluded its second season. In December 2013, it was revealed by the cast, via Twitter, that Teen Mom 3 had been canceled after one season. In March 2017, it was announced that cast member Briana DeJesus would join the Teen Mom 2 cast for the eighth season. In July 2019, it was announced that cast member Mackenzie McKee would join the Teen Mom OG cast during the first half of the eighth season as a guest mom, before becoming a permanent cast member for the second half of the eighth season.

== Cast ==
=== Briana DeJesus ===
Briana DeJesus (from Orlando, Florida) welcomed her first child with her ex-boyfriend, Devoin Austin II. Her daughter Nova Star DeJesus was born on September 10, 2011.

=== Mackenzie McKee ===
Mackenzie McKee (née Douthit) (from Miami, Oklahoma) welcomed her first son, Gannon Dewayne McKee, on September 12, 2011, with her husband, Josh McKee. It was announced on August 13, 2013, that the couple were expecting a second child. Josh and Mackenzie married on August 17, 2013. On February 7, 2014, Mackenzie gave birth to her second child, a girl, Jaxie Taylor McKee. McKee gave birth to son Broncs Weston on August 14, 2016.

=== Alex Sekella ===
Alexandria Sekella (from Allentown, Pennsylvania) is an aspiring dancer who had a baby with her ex-boyfriend, Matt McCann. Alex's mother made it clear that if Sekella did not place the baby up for adoption, Sekella and the baby would have no place to live. Sekella's and McCann's daughter, Arabella Elizabeth Sekella-McCann, was born on July 18, 2011. McCann and Sekella have since broken off their engagement, and McCann spent time in rehab for his drug addiction.

=== Katie Yeager ===
Katie Yeager (from Rock Springs, Wyoming) and Joey Maes became the parents of daughter Molli J. Maes on August 18, 2011.

== Episodes ==
No.	Title	Original release date	US viewers (millions)
1	"Hope for the Best"	August 26, 2013	1.81
In the series premiere, Briana decides to take legal action against her ex-boyfriend, Devoin, after he continues to neglect his parenting duties and spread lies about Briana via Twitter. Katie and Joey get into an argument after Joey gets Katie's car into an accident then fails to inform her about it. Alex's ex-boyfriend, Matt, returns from rehab and Alex slowly introduces him into the role of being a father. Mackenzie and Josh celebrate their second anniversary by arguing.
2	"Second Thoughts"	August 26, 2013	1.55
After reading what Devoin posted on Twitter, Briana decides to go to the court house and files an order of protection. Mackenzie feels that Josh should move in with her in order to strengthen their bond and for Josh to take more responsibilities as a parent. Alex still has a hard time trusting Matt, and feels that he is still trying to get high. Joey proposes to Katie.
3	"Growing Up Fast"	September 2, 2013	1.29
Josh agrees to spend one night a week at Mackenzie's house to help take care of Gannon, but the two sleep in separate bedrooms because MacKenzie's mother doesn't want them to have sex before marriage. Katie and Joey discuss moving into their own place because Katie feels that their current living situation is too small. Alex continues pushing Matt to get a job and start pulling his own weight. Briana drops the order of protection against Devoin and explains that she hopes that he'll start to shape up and become a better father. Katie and Joey check out a model apartment then agree to rent one. Joey's friend calls Katie to ask for the $400 that he lent Joey three years ago. Joey wakes up to find the electricity off because bill wasn't paid. Mackenzie has an OB/GYN appointment to have an IUD inserted. Alex and Matt continue to argue over trust issues and Matt's unemployment. Wendy, Alex's mom, shares her advice with the two and tells Matt what he should do to improve things. Devoin babysits Nova for an hour, alone, unaware that Briana is waiting outside the house instead of going to a restaurant with her mom and sister like she told him. Alex and Matt attend their first couples therapy meeting. Katie and Joey get into a major argument an hour before he leaves for work. Katie begins to cry when Joey says that their relationship is over just as he's walking out the door.
4	"Pushing the Envelope"	September 9, 2013	1.38
Mackenize, Josh, and Ganon are out enjoying dinner when Mackenize informs Josh that her prom this coming up. Later, Whitney, Mackenzie's sister, watches Ganon while Mackenzie goes prom dress shopping with her friend, Cayla. After trying on a few dresses and looking at the price tags, Mackenzie decides to borrow a friends dress in order put that money she would've spent on necessary supplies for Gannon. While Brittany, Briana's sister, is out with her friends, Briana is stuck at home pondering on the fact that she has yet to start college or acquire a drivers license. Devoin texted Briana earlier informing her that he was planning on stopping by after work to visit with Nova but he never shows up. Katie hasn't spoken to Joey since their last altercation. Joey, at his mother's house, talks with his step-dad about the fight. His step-dad tells Joey that he needs to think about Molli and how all the fighting is affecting her. Alex discovers that Matt is talking to other women online. Matt and his friend, Murray, take a walk and discuss what's been going on at the house. Briana gets a visit from a baby proofing company to get an estimate about baby proofing their home, which is going to cost $300. Katie has Joey come over so they can talk about their fight. Katie brings up going to couples therapy so they can find better ways to express their feelings. Devoin texts Briana again saying that he'll come over, and Briana is skeptical since he was a no show last time. Alex confronts Matt about the women he's been talking to online. Matt denies everything, which agitates Alex. Katie and Joey visit Amy, a counselor, to talk about their fighting. Katie reveals that she doesn't really mean what she says during their arguments. Devoin actually comes over to the house, and Nova has no clue who he is — giving him a blank stare. Briana and Devoin's conversation escalates then Devoin ends up leaving. Mackenzie's prom has arrived. Josh and Mackenzie walk with Gannon down the red carpet, then hand him off to her sister so they can go inside and enjoy their time. Matt, Murray and Molli are outside hanging out while Alex goes to pick up her friend, Marina. Katie and Joey move into their brand new apartment. They agree that their new apartment gives them a fresh start in their relationship. Roxanne, Briana's mother, calls Devoin to once again try to have him realize the reality of being a parent. Devoin agrees to pay half of the baby proofing fee, and to be there more for Nova. Wendy, Alex's mother, arrives home from work. She asks him about his online conversations with other women. Alex arrives during the conversation. She begins to yell at Matt, telling him that he's a liar and Matt responds by flipping off Alex then walking off. Wendy tells Matt to collect all of his things and move out of their house because they have all had enough of his antics.
5	"Moving Forward"	September 16, 2013	1.43
Joey is watching Molli while Katie is doing a photo shoot for an upcoming bridal fashion show she was asked to partake in. After her photo shoot, Katie meets up with her friend Veronica for lunch and the two discuss Katie's discomfort with her post-pregnancy body. Brittany, Briana's sister, announces that she's leaving to go on a road trip with her friends. Mackenzie and Josh take Gannon to his first rodeo. Josh looks in awe from the stands since he hasn't ridden due to Mackenzie worrying about him after he suffered several concussions. Alex and Wendy, Alex's mother, discuss the altercation that occurred a few days prior. Alex agrees to begin attending therapy in order to resolve her anger issues. Katie and Veronica attend a zumba class so she can shed a few pounds prior to the fashion show. Mackenzie and Victoria are in the library, where Mackenzie reveals that she's going to let Josh start riding again. Mackenzie feels that since Josh supports her cheerleading, which is almost as dangerous as riding, he should be able to do what he enjoys too. Joey shows up to the fashion show, despite him not agreeing with the lingerie potion. Joey walks out halfway through the show and leaves Katie wandering to find him after. Alex is hanging out with her younger siblings when Matt calls and asks if they can meet at the park the next day —Alex agrees. At the park, Alex and Matt's conversation escalates once Alex notices that Matt is currently high.
6	"To Be Judged"	September 23, 2013	1.42
Josh has come to the conclusion that he wants to have his main source of income to stem from participating in the Rodeo. Mackenize is unable to find anyone to watch Gannon while she goes to tumbling practice so she takes him with her. After practice, Mackenzie sits down and talks with her cheer coach plus two friends. Mackenzie's cheer coach, Matt, expresses his concern for Mackenzie's future with her only source of income being Josh's money from rodeo; which arrives solely when he wins. Katie is worried that Joey is smoking weed again once she receives several overdraft notices from the bank. Alex's mother walks into the basement, where Matt had been staying, and discovers that everything was left in disarray. Alex hasn't talked to Matt since their meet-up at the park a few days ago but she calls Matt to have him come clean up after himself. Devoin is coming over to visit Nova for the first time in three weeks, and still has yet to pay his share of the baby-proofing. Josh's father, Rick, goes over the dangers of Josh returning rodeo and the possible injuries that could paralyze him for life. Josh feels that he's ready to go back to rodeo, and fully understands the risk he is taking by going back. Two hours after calling Matt, he finally arrives at Alex's house. Matt organizes some things, Alex denies him permission to give Arabella a kiss, then he leaves. Alex follows Matt out the door to inform him that he left some items behind but he ignores Alex and drives off. Devoin comes over and Briana informs him that he can stay out of her and Nova's life since he hasn't been there at all. This leads to a confrontation between Briana, Devoin, and Roxanne — Briana's mother. Roxanne pushes Devoin out the door and even throws a vase at him while he's walking away. Matt goes to see his caseworker, where he reveals that he is an IV Heroin user. Matt's caseworker informs him that he can move into a transitional living center for homeless men, to which he agrees. Katie and Joey have to bring Molli to their couples therapy due to Katie's family flaking on their babysitting duties.
7	"Into the Distance"	September 30, 2013	1.21
Katie and Joey have improved on their relationship due to Joey's decision to stop smoking weed. Katie is completing her first two years at junior college, and hopes to move out of state to work towards her bachelors degree in social work. With Alex suspecting Matt is using drugs again, she plans on acquiring full custody of Arabella; giving Matt only supervised visits. Briana and Brittany take Nova to a baby music class so Briana and Nova can spend some time out of the house. Mackenzie feels neglected when Josh starts spending most of his time practicing rodeo. Alex, Arabella, and Mariana head to the tattoo shop where Alex receives a tattoo of Arabella's birth date and footprint. Matt goes back to the intake center to meet with his caseworker. Matt learns that he is approved for the transitional housing but later misses his scheduled intake time then storms out — not wanting to partake in the program at all. Mackenzie waits for Josh at his house, and becomes annoyed when Josh arrives an hour later. Briana talks with her mother about her upcoming court date regarding Devoin's harassment via Twitter. The next day, Briana and Roxanne attend their court hearing. Devoin denies that the evidence Brianna brought to court was composed by him thus the judge states that there is insufficient evidence to pursue any charges. While at home, Alex receives a call that Matt has possibly overdosed and is being rushed to the hospital. Shocked by the news, Alex puts Arabella in her car seat and heads to the hospital.
8	"Some Days Matter More"	October 7, 2013	1.35
9	"Don't Lie to Me"	October 14, 2013	1.26
10	"Strike Out Alone"	October 21, 2013	1.10
11	"The Truth Hurts"	October 28, 2013	1.25
12	"Taking Chances"	November 4, 2013	1.14
13	"Teen Mom 3 Unseen Moments"	November 4, 2013	0.77
14	"For Better or Worse"	November 11, 2013	1.19
15	"Finale Special — Check Up with Dr. Drew"	November 18, 2013	1.24
