= Maci Bookout =

American reality television personality

Maci Bookout McKinney
- Born: Maci DeShane Bookout; August 10, 1991 (age 35); Chattanooga, Tennessee, U.S.
- Occupations: Television personality; Author; Public speaker
- Years active: 2009–present
- Television: 16 and Pregnant; Teen Mom OG; Naked and Afraid
- Spouse: Taylor McKinney (m. 2016)
- Children: 3

Maci Bookout McKinney (born Maci DeShane Bookout; August 10, 1991) is an American reality television personality, author, and public speaker. Born and raised in Chattanooga, Tennessee, she received public attention after being cast in the reality television series 16 and Pregnant in 2009, which documented the pregnancies and first months of motherhood for several young women. Later that year she was cast in the spin-off series Teen Mom, and appeared in each of its four seasons until its conclusion in 2012. In March 2015, Bookout, along with Catelynn Baltierra, Amber Portwood, and Farrah Abraham, returned to MTV for the fifth season of the show, renamed Teen Mom OG.

In September 2016 she released her first book, Bulletproof, and she released her second book, I Wasn't Born Bulletproof: Lessons I've Learned (So You Don't Have To), in June 2017.

In 2018, Bookout appeared on Naked and Afraid, attempting to survive 14 days in the wilderness, but she quit the show on day 2.

Maci and husband Taylor have their own clothing brand, TTM - Things That Matter.

== Personal life ==
Bookout was born to parents Gene and Sharon Bookout; she also has an older brother named Matt. After graduating from Ooltewah High School in 2009, she attended Chattanooga State Community College and graduated with an Associate of Arts degree in Spring 2015.

Bookout became pregnant with her first child with then-boyfriend Ryan Edwards, and gave birth to their son Bentley Cadence on October 27, 2008. The two got engaged in 2009 but subsequently ended their relationship in 2010. After the breakup with Edwards, Bookout began dating childhood friend Kyle King. The pair briefly lived together but ended their relationship in 2012 amid rumors of King's infidelity.

Bookout began dating Taylor McKinney, a motocross racer from Texas, in 2012. The pair announced Bookout was pregnant with their first child together in January 2015, and they welcomed a daughter Jayde Carter on May 29, 2015. McKinney proposed to Bookout on January 19, 2016, in Venice Beach, California while filming an episode of Teen Mom OG, shortly before the pair announced Bookout was pregnant with their second child together. She gave birth to son Maverick Reed on May 31, 2016.

On October 8, 2016, Bookout and McKinney were married in Greenville, Florida.

Bookout has experienced troubles with ex-boyfriend Ryan Edwards since the birth of their son. It was revealed in March 2018 that Bookout and husband Taylor McKinney filed an order of protection against Edwards following claims Edwards left voicemail messages threatening to take their son and making threats towards Bookout and McKinney. The order of protection was subsequently dismissed and a mutual restraining order was put in place in May 2018.
