= Amber Portwood =

American reality television personality

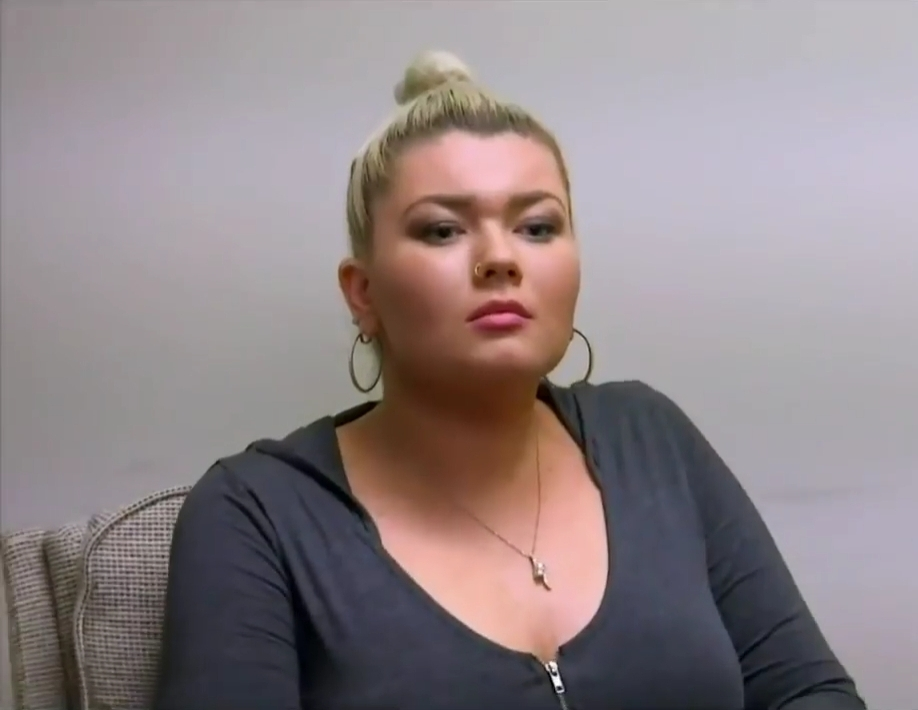
- Born: Amber Leann Portwood; 1990 (age 35–36); Anderson, Indiana, U.S.
- Occupations: Television personality; Author
- Years active: 2009–present
- Television: 16 and Pregnant; Teen Mom; Marriage Boot Camp
- Partner(s): Gary Shirley (2008–2011); Matt Baier (2014–2017); Andrew Glennon (2017–2019)
- Children: 2

Amber Leann Portwood (born 1990) is an American reality television personality and convicted criminal. From Anderson, Indiana, she is known for being cast in the reality television series 16 and Pregnant in 2009, which documented the pregnancies and first months of motherhood for several teenage girls. Portwood received particular public attention in 2010 where an episode documented Portwood's domestic violence against her partner, Gary Shirley, with Portwood eventually imprisoned for this and other crimes. She also went on to abuse her third partner Andrew Glennon.

Portwood was also cast in the spin-off series Teen Mom, and appeared in each of its four seasons until its conclusion in 2012. In March 2015, Portwood, along with Maci McKinney, Catelynn Baltierra, and Farrah Abraham, returned to MTV for the fifth season of the show, renamed Teen Mom OG.

== Personal life ==
Amber Leann Portwood is the daughter of Tonya and Shawn Edwin Portwood Sr. (1964–2014). She has a brother, Shawn Edwin Portwood Jr., a United States Army veteran, and a sister, Candace Portwood (1995–1996), who died in infancy. Portwood told the press that she had been neglected by her mother in her early teens, after her mother began having an affair. She attended Anderson High School, but dropped out after falling pregnant.

Portwood became pregnant by her then-boyfriend, Gary Shirley, in 2008 and, later that year, on November 12, at the age of 18, gave birth to their daughter, Leah Leann Shirley. Portwood and Shirley were engaged for a time but ultimately separated, with Shirley being granted full custody of Leah in December 2011. Shirley went on to wed Kristina Shirley (née Tinch, formerly Anderson), by whom he has a daughter, Emilee Grace Shirley, and became a police officer.

From 2014 until 2017, Portwood was engaged to Matt Baier, an amateur DJ she met through the social networking site Twitter.

Portwood fell pregnant a second time by her boyfriend, Andrew Glennon, in 2017 and Portwood gave birth to their son, James Andrew Glennon, on May 8, 2018.

In 2024, Portwood got engaged to Gary Wayt. On June 9, Wayt was reported missing in North Carolina only a few weeks after their engagement.

Portwood has been diagnosed with bipolar disorder and borderline personality disorder.

== Legal issues ==
MTV aired footage of Portwood's violent behaviour towards her child's father Gary Shirley, most notably a September 2010 broadcast showing an assault in which Shirley refused to physically defend himself and was injured. The MTV crew failed to intervene in Portwood's attacks and also failed to report the crimes to the police. An investigation from the police department of Anderson, Indiana, and that city's branch of the state Child Protective Services was later launched after the authorities were alerted by concerned viewers of the footage upon its broadcast, weeks after the incidents occurred.

The episode showed Portwood punching, slapping, and choking Shirley, she then kicked him in the back as he descended a set of stairs. The broadcast sparked hundreds of public complaints questioning Portwood's suitability to be a mother. Police searched Portwood's apartment, finding "evidence that requires further investigation," but would not specify what had been found at the time; it was later revealed that Portwood had been caught with a large quantity of marijuana and crack cocaine. On November 3, 2010, it was reported that Portwood agreed to allow Indiana CPS to monitor her for up to six months in exchange for CPS's allowing her to maintain custody of Leah.

On November 18, after an extensive investigation, Portwood was charged with three counts of domestic violence, two of them felonies, in connection with separate incidents of on-camera abuse of Shirley. The same day, MTV released a statement concerning the charges filed on Portwood: "We are cooperating with all parties and hope for a quick and fair resolution that allows everyone involved to move forward in a positive manner." On June 9, 2011, Portwood pleaded guilty to two felony counts of domestic battery and was given a two-year suspended sentence and two years' probation.

In December 2011, Portwood was arrested for the Class D felony of possession of a controlled substance and was later charged with violating her probation on her earlier domestic-violence charges by breaching conditions including behaving well in society, obtaining a GED certificate, completing six months of anger-management training, paying her probation fees, and setting up a $10,000 college fund for Leah. She was held without bond in Madison County Jail until her January 27, 2012, hearing on both charges, at which she entered a guilty plea and the court scheduled a sentencing hearing for February 6 of that year. On February 6, 2012, Portwood was given a five-year suspended sentence with the provision that all charges would be dropped if she went to and completed rehab.

In March 2012, Portwood failed to take a required drug test, violating the associated condition of her suspended sentence and putting herself in jeopardy of having the five-year suspended sentence reimposed. At the ensuing probation violation hearing, the judge in the case declined to reimpose any portion of the suspended sentence, instead requiring Amber to complete 30 days of daily drug tests. Portwood subsequently dropped out of her rehabilitation program and was charged with a third violation of her probation; in June 2012, the court reimposed Portwood's five-year sentence in its entirety.

On June 13, 2012, Portwood began serving her five-year sentence, during which she was expected to attend substance abuse classes and earn her GED.

On December 20, 2013, Portwood made an appearance on the talk show Dr. Phil. She said that she had been released from jail early due to good behavior and now has her GED. Portwood also said that she was high on prescription and illegal medication for most episodes of Teen Mom and that she was sober with no intent of ever using again. Portwood said she was working on obtaining a joint custody agreement with her ex-boyfriend Gary Shirley and was trying to focus on being a good mom to her daughter. She also has established an organization to help teens stay off drugs.

On July 5, 2019, Portwood was arrested in Indianapolis, Indiana and charged with two counts of domestic battery and one count of criminal recklessness with a deadly weapon, after she struck Glennon in the neck while Glennon held James in his arms, threatened to commit suicide by overdosing on clonazepam, and used a machete to attempt and break into the room where Glennon was hiding with their son. Portwood made bail the following day, after posting a bond of $2,000, and was released from jail. A restraining order was issued against Portwood, ordering she have no contact with Glennon. In October 2019, Portwood pleaded guilty to two felony charges of domestic battery and intimidation, and was sentenced to 906 days of probation. Should Portwood violate her probation she will be sentenced to five years' imprisonment. She must also take 26 weeks of parenting classes.
