= Teen Mom UK =

British reality television series

- Genre: Reality television
- Starring: Amber Butler; Megan Salmon-Ferrari; Chloe Patton; Mia Rose Boardman; Sassi Simmonds; Shannon Wise; Naomi Konickova; Emma Finch
- Country of origin: United Kingdom
- Original language: English
- No. of series: 12
- No. of episodes: 88

Production
- Production company: True North Productions

Original release
- Network: MTV UK; Paramount+
- Release: 2 November 2016 – 10 September 2025

Related
- Teen Mom

Teen Mom UK is a British reality television series set in the United Kingdom. It is a spin-off of the American franchise Teen Mom. It currently airs on MTV. The series was first announced in September 2016. It currently follows the lives of four British teenage mums who are trying to make it through motherhood. From July 2017, the series is shown in the U.S. under the name Teen Mum.

== Cast ==
=== Amber Butler ===
Amber Butler (from Blackpool, Lancashire)

Amber is the mother of Brooklyn, whom she had with her boyfriend Ste Rankine at the age of 17.

=== Chloe Patton ===
Chloe Patton (from Nottingham, Nottinghamshire)

Chloe became a mother, to son Marley, at age 17, with boyfriend Jordan Edwards. Chloe and Jordan admit that they did not plan on starting a family so young. Throughout the series, we see Chloe dealing with baby blues, as well as maintaining relationships with friends and family.

=== Megan Salmon Ferrari ===
Megan Salmon-Ferrari (from Chelmsford, Essex)

Megan had her son Mckenzie with her first boyfriend, Dylan Siggers, when she was 17 years old. They lived in a caravan on Dylan's parents drive.

In mid-2016, a few weeks after Mckenzie was born, Dylan proposed to Megan, however the engagement was short-lived; with Megan discovering that Dylan had been unfaithful. The couple later reconciled, with Dylan proposing to Megan again while they were on holiday together in Spain.

Megan announced that she and Dylan were expecting their second child in November 2016, their daughter, Dulcie Mae, was born in March 2017.

=== Mia Boardman ===
Mia Boardman (from Southampton, Hampshire)

Mia was 9 months pregnant with Marliya when she started filming Teen Mom UK at the age of 19. The birth of Marliya was captured for the show, with Mia's plans for a natural birth being derailed after the baby's heartbeat dropped, forcing her to have a caesarean section.

Marliya's father is Mia's ex-boyfriend Manley Geddes, they were teenage sweethearts. The couple separated for a few years before filming and during that time Manley had Aalayah with ex-girlfriend Erin.

=== Naomi Konickova ===
Naomi Konickova (from London)

Naomi had daughter Kyanna at the age of 17, with boyfriend Raphael Poitou.

=== Timeline of cast members ===
Cast member	Series												
Cast member	1	2	3	4	5	6	7	8	9	10	11	12	13
Mia Boardman	Main	Main	Main		Guest			Main	Main	Main	Main	Main	
Amber Butler	Main	Main	Main	Main	Main	Main	Main	Main	Main	Main	Main	Main	
Naomi Konickova	Main												
Chloe Patton	Main	Main	Main	Main	Main	Main	Main	Main	Main	Main	Main	Main	
Megan Salmon-Ferrari	Main	Main	Main		Main	Main	Main						
Sassi Simmonds		Main	Main	Main	Main	Main		Main	Main	Main	Main	Main	
Shannon Wise				Main	Main	Main							
Emma Finch							Main						

== Episodes ==
=== Series overview ===
Series	Episodes	Originally released	
Series	Episodes	First released	Last released
1	8	2 November 2016	21 December 2016
2	8	26 July 2017	13 September 2017
3	8	14 March 2018	2 May 2018
4	8	5 September 2018	24 October 2018
5	8	23 January 2019	13 March 2019
6	8	24 July 2019	11 September 2019
7	8	1 April 2020	20 May 2020
8	8	6 July 2022	10 August 2022
9	8	13 September 2023	1 November 2023
10	8	16 October 2024	4 December 2024
11	4	11 June 2025	2 July 2025
12	4	20 August 2025	10 September 2025
13	4	23 June 2026	14 July 2026

=== Series 1 (2016) ===
No. overall	No. in season	Title	Original release date
1	1	"Meet the Mums!"	2 November 2016
2	2	"Decisions Decisions"	9 November 2016
3	3	"Horses for Courses"	16 November 2016
4	4	"Trouble and Paradise"	23 November 2016
5	5	"Outfits, Arguments and Ultimatums"	30 November 2016
6	6	"It's All Over"	7 December 2016
7	7	"The Future's Bright"	14 December 2016
8	8	"New Beginnings"	21 December 2016

=== Series 2 (2017) ===
No. overall	No. in season	Title	Original release date
9	1	"A New Arrival"	26 July 2017
10	2	"Relationship Woes"	2 August 2017
11	3	"Be My Valentine"	9 August 2017
12	4	"Home Sweet Home"	16 August 2017
13	5	"Labour and Love"	23 August 2017
14	6	"Lads' Trip"	30 August 2017
15	7	"Making Memories"	6 September 2017
16	8	"Now Or Never"	13 September 2017

=== Series 3 (2018) ===
No. overall	No. in season	Title	Original release date
17	1	"Make or Break"	26 March 2018
18	2	"The Ex Factor"	2 April 2018
19	3	"Enough Is Enough"	9 April 2018
20	4	"Emotions and Explosions"	16 April 2018
21	5	"New Direction"	23 April 2018
22	6	"Happy Ever After"	30 April 2018
23	7	"Let's Party"	7 May 2018
24	8	"Stand By Your Man"	14 May 2018

=== Series 4 (2018) ===
No. overall	No. in season	Title	Original release date
25	1	"End of an Era"	5 September 2018
26	2	"Seeing Red"	12 September 2018
27	3	"Puppy Love"	19 September 2018
28	4	"This Girl Can"	26 September 2018
29	5	"A New Normal"	3 October 2018
30	6	"Daddy Day Care"	10 October 2018
31	7	"Leap of Faith"	17 October 2018
32	8	"Shock and Surprise"	24 October 2018

=== Series 5 (2019) ===
No. overall	No. in season	Title	Original release date
33	1	"Starting Over"	23 January 2019
34	2	"Love and Loss"	30 January 2019
35	3	"New Experiences"	6 February 2019
36	4	"Sun, Sea, Tears and Fears"	13 February 2019
37	5	"Man Trouble"	17 February 2019
38	6	"Time Out"	27 February 2019
39	7	"Tearful Breakthrough"	6 March 2019
40	8	"Fighting Talk"	13 March 2019

=== Series 6 (2019) ===
No. overall	No. in season	Title	Original release date
41	1	"All Change"	24 July 2019
42	2	"Stress and Strain"	31 July 2019
43	3	"Standing Strong"	7 August 2019
44	4	"Face Off"	14 August 2019
45	5	"Kick Start Careers"	21 August 2019
46	6	"Staying Positive"	28 August 2019
47	7	"Family First"	4 September 2019
48	8	"Big News"	11 September 2019

=== Series 7 (2020) ===
No. overall	No. in season	Title	Original release date
49	1	"Fresh Start"	1 April 2020
50	2	"Love Hurts"	8 April 2020
51	3	"Reality Bites"	15 April 2020
52	4	"New World"	22 April 2020
53	5	"Family Matters"	29 April 2020
54	6	"Escape Reality"	6 May 2020
55	7	"Reach for the Stars"	13 May 2020
56	8	"This Is Me"	20 May 2020

=== Series 8 (2022) ===
No. overall	No. in season	Title	Original release date
57	1	"Highs & Lows"	6 July 2022
58	2	"Bust ups and Breakthroughs"	13 July 2022
59	3	"Secrets & Surprises"	20 July 2022
60	4	"Bling, Rings And New Beginnings"	27 July 2022
61	5	"Exposed"	3 August 2022
62	6	"Episode 6 - Escape Reality"	10 August 2022
63	7	"No Limits"	17 August 2022
64	8	"Tiffs, Tantrums & Talking From The Heart"	24 August 2022

=== Series 9 (2023) ===
No. overall	No. in season	Title	Original release date
65	1	"Back with a Bang"	13 September 2023
66	2	"Man Trouble"	20 September 2023
67	3	"Life and Death"	27 September 2023
68	4	"Rock Bottom"	4 October 2023
69	5	"Turning Points"	11 October 2023
70	6	"Moving On"	18 October 2023
71	7	"Showdown"	25 October 2023
72	8	"Decision Time"	1 November 2023

=== Series 10 (2024) ===
No. overall	No. in season	Title	Original release date
73	1	"Everything's Changed"	16 October 2024
74	2	"New Starts, Old Problems"	23 October 2024
75	3	"Looking Forward"	30 October 2024
76	4	"Ex Problems, House Problems, Mum Problems"	6 November 2024
77	5	"Sleepless Nights, Difficult Days"	13 November 2024
78	6	"New Outlook, New Problems"	20 November 2024
79	7	"Bumps in the Road"	27 November 2024
80	8	"The Future"	4 December 2024

=== Series 11 (2025) ===
No. overall	No. in season	Title	Original release date
81	1	"A New Chapter for Some"	10 June 2025
82	2	"Old Problems and New"	17 June 2025
83	3	"Looking Forward or Back?"	24 June 2025
84	4	"The Big Days"	2 July 2025

=== Series 12 (2025) ===
No. overall	No. in season	Title	Original release date
85	1	"New Beginnings"	20 August 2025
86	2	"Tension Builds"	27 August 2025
87	3	"A Welcome Break"	3 September 2025
88	4	"Family First"	10 September 2025

=== Series 13 (2026) ===
No. overall	No. in season	Title	Original release date
89	1	"Fresh Start"	23 June 2026
90	2	"Cracks Are Showing"	30 June 2026
90	4	"Coming to a Head"	7 July 2026
91	4	"Uneasy Truce"	14 July 2026
