= Morgan J. Freeman =

American director (born 1969)

- Born: December 5, 1969 (age 56); Long Beach, California, U.S.
- Education: University of California, Santa Barbara (B.A. 1992); New York University (M.F.A. 1996)
- Occupations: Director, producer, screenwriter

Morgan J. Freeman (born December 5, 1969) is an American film and television director, producer, and screenwriter. In 1997, his debut feature Hurricane Streets won three awards at the Sundance Film Festival.

== Early life and education ==
Freeman was born and raised in Long Beach, California on December 5, 1969. He is Jewish. He started making films as a teenager, basing them on the TV series Miami Vice.

Freeman attended the University of California, Santa Barbara, where he worked for the campus newspaper, the Daily Nexus. While working for the Daily Nexus, his article entitled "Violence, arson continue in L.A." won Columbia Scholastic Press Association's 1993 Collegiate Gold Circle Award for news writing and third place in the California Intercollegiate Press Awards. He graduated in 1992 with a B.A. in film studies.

He spent the following year in Amsterdam, working for Why Not Productions and studying film theory at the Sorbonne. He later entered New York University's Graduate Film Program where he graduated with a M.F.A. in 1996.

== Career ==
=== Early career and Hurricane Streets ===
During the summer of 1994 while still enrolled at NYU, Morgan met Todd Solondz while doing an internship. Solondz hired Morgan to work on the crew of his upcoming film, Welcome to the Dollhouse, where he was promoted from production assistant to second assistant director. The movie went on to win Sundance Film Festival's 1996 Grand Jury Prize Dramatic, but more importantly for Freeman it was during this time he befriended actor Brendan Sexton III, the eventual star of Hurricane Streets.

Hurricane Streets served as Freeman's thesis at New York University, against instruction to avoid using feature films. Sexton III's character from Welcome to the Dollhouse inspired Freeman to write Hurricane Streets, which he originally wanted to name Hurricane but was unable due to the closeness to the Denzel Washington feature The Hurricane.

Freeman submitted his thesis to the Sundance Film Festival, where it became the first film to win three major honors at the 1997 Sundance Film Festival: Audience Award Dramatic, Directing Award Dramatic, Excellence in Cinematography Award Dramatic. The film was bought by MGM at Sundance.

=== Further film projects ===
Following the critical success of Hurricane Streets, Freeman wrote and directed Desert Blue. The film was distributed by the Samuel Goldwyn Company and re-teamed Freeman with Sexton. The film starred Christina Ricci, Casey Affleck, Ethan Suplee, Peter Sarsgaard, and Kate Hudson (in her film debut).

In 2000, Freeman wrote and directed The Cherry Picker for Showtime starring Janeane Garofalo. He directed several music videos, including two for the breakout indie band Rilo Kiley, and directed the teen hit Dawson's Creek for The WB. In 2001, Freeman directed American Psycho 2 for Lions Gate Entertainment. In 2003, he helmed the independent feature Piggy Banks, which starred Gabriel Mann, Kelli Garner, and Tom Sizemore.

Just Like the Son premiered to audience and critical acclaim at the 2006 Tribeca Film Festival and won the Alice Nella Citta Prize for Best Feature Film at its European debut in Italy at the 2006 Rome Film Festival. The film stars Sexton, Mark Webber, and Rosie Perez.

Freeman directed the 2009 film Homecoming, starring Mischa Barton.

=== Television projects ===
Freeman produced the MTV reality show Laguna Beach: The Real Orange County. In 2007, he created and executive produced the television series Maui Fever, another MTV reality series. He also produced the MTV reality shows 16 and Pregnant, Teen Mom and Teen Mom 2.
