= Catelynn Lowell =

Teen Mom cast member

Catelynn Baltierra
- Born: Catelynn Lowell; March 12, 1992 (age 34); Port Huron, Michigan, U.S.
- Occupations: Television personality; Author; Public speaker
- Years active: 2009–present
- Television: 16 and Pregnant; Teen Mom OG; Couples Therapy (Season 3); Reunited
- Spouse: Tyler Baltierra (m. 2015)
- Children: 4

Catelynn Baltierra (née Lowell; born March 12, 1992) is an American reality television personality, author, and public speaker. From Algonac, Michigan, she received public attention after being cast in the reality television series 16 and Pregnant in 2009, which documented the pregnancies and first months of motherhood for several young women. Later that year she was cast in the spin-off series Teen Mom, and appeared in each of its four seasons until its conclusion in 2012. In March 2015, Lowell returned to MTV for the fifth season of the show, renamed Teen Mom OG. Baltierra and now-husband Tyler also appeared on Season 3 of TV Show Couples Therapy.

Lowell and Baltierra released their first book, Conquering Chaos, in March 2015. In December 2016, the couple's show Reunited aired on MTV, helping people who had been adopted reunite with their birth families; it was cancelled after just one airing.

== Personal life ==
Catelynn Lowell was born in Port Huron, Michigan, on March 12, 1992, to parents April Brockmiller and David Lowell.

Lowell became pregnant with her first child with boyfriend Tyler Baltierra, and gave birth to a baby girl on May 18, 2009, named Carly by her adoptive parents, Brandon and Teresa.

On August 22, 2015, Tyler and Catelynn married. They have since had three daughters: Novalee Reign (b. 2015), Vaeda Luma (b. 2019) and Rya Rose (b. 2021).

On November 17, 2017, Lowell took to social media to tell fans she was seeking treatment after experiencing suicidal thoughts. Following a miscarriage, Lowell returned to treatment for a third time in January 2018, citing childhood trauma as one of the causes of her mental health issues after speculation by fans on X.

In the summer of 2024, Lowell revealed that the adoption of their daughter Carly had closed, as her adoptive mother, Teresa, had blocked her. She, Tyler and their three youngest daughters have not seen Carly since 2023.

In late May 2025, leaked messages surfaced on social media indicating that Catelynn and Tyler were in contact with people who alleged themselves to be Carly's friends, in an attempt to get in touch with her and maintain a relationship after the closure of the adoption and her adoptive family ceasing contact. The messages were confirmed to be with Lowell and Baltierra and the alleged friends of their biological daughter, and while the true identities of those they are texting have yet to be confirmed, they have made the couple the subject of numerous grooming and stalking allegations, given the age of the children involved, the nature of the messages, and the information that they were seeking. Lowell and Baltierra have not commented on the grooming and stalking allegations directly, but stated they would no longer be speaking publicly about the adoption.
