= List of Teen Mom 2 episodes =

Teen Mom 2 is an American reality television series that premiered January 11, 2011, on MTV. It is the second spin-off of 16 and Pregnant.

== Series overview ==
Season	Episodes		Originally released	
Season	Episodes		First released	Last released
1	12		January 11, 2011	March 29, 2011
2	12		December 6, 2011	February 14, 2012
3	13		November 12, 2012	February 4, 2013
4	12		February 18, 2013	April 29, 2013
5	25	13	January 21, 2014	April 13, 2014
5	25	12	July 16, 2014	October 1, 2014
6	12		July 9, 2015	September 24, 2015
7	24	12	March 21, 2016	June 6, 2016
7	24	12	January 2, 2017	March 13, 2017
8	31	18	July 17, 2017	November 6, 2017
8	31	13	May 7, 2018	July 30, 2018
9	30	18	January 14, 2019	May 13, 2019
9	30	12	September 10, 2019	November 26, 2019
10	30	18	September 1, 2020	December 29, 2020
10	30	12	May 4, 2021	July 20, 2021
11	10		March 8, 2022	May 10, 2022

== Episodes ==
=== Season 1 (2011) ===
No. overall	No. in season	Title	Original release date	US viewers (millions)
1	1	"Nothing Stays the Same"	January 11, 2011	3.57
Jenelle's partying forces her mom Barbara to take away custody of Jace. Leah tries to work things out with Corey, who is the father of her twins. Chelsea tries to get on track to graduate. Kailyn is heartbroken after her breakup with Jo.
2	2	"So Much to Lose"	January 18, 2011	3.65
Leah breaks down when the health of one of her twins is in question. Chelsea starts hanging out with her ex-boyfriend. Kailyn starts dating a new guy, much to the dismay of her ex Jo. Jenelle tries to move back home after she realizes how much money a lawyer costs.
3	3	"Change of Heart"	January 25, 2011	4.04
Over the 4th of July, Jo's parents give Kailyn an ultimatum; lose the new guy and focus on school or find a new place to live. Jenelle has a change of heart and agrees to surrender custody of Jace to her mom Barbara. Leah and Corey give it another shot and get back together. Chelsea tells her friend Megan that she's giving Adam another chance.
4	4	"Moving In, Moving On"	February 1, 2011	3.79
Kailyn is forced to borrow money from Jo to pay for school. Chelsea lets Adam move in so Aubree can have a normal family. Jenelle meets a new guy named Kieffer and spends the night with him even though she’s supposed to babysit Jace the next day. Leah and Corey decide to move in together and find their own place.
5	5	"Too Much Too Fast"	February 8, 2011	3.44
While Jenelle is trying to figure out how to pay for school, she breaks Barbara's rule again. Things get tough for Leah and Corey once she's stuck at home watching the girls full time. Adam moves in and Chelsea tries to hide it from her dad Randy. Kailyn starts school, but has to figure out where she and Isaac should live when she is kicked out of Jo's home.
6	6	"Taking Sides"	February 15, 2011	3.70
Adam and Megan's fighting gets worse and he forces her to move out. Barbara helps Jenelle and invites her to Jace's first birthday. Leah and Corey's romance heats up. Kailyn moves back in with Jo's parents.
7	7	"Switching Gears"	February 22, 2011	4.00
Corey shocks Leah with a marriage proposal, but things get hard when they get bad news about Ali's health. Chelsea tries to shift her focus back on school. Kailyn gets another job so she can move out. Jenelle and Kieffer have to find a place to live.
8	8	"Pushing the Limit"	March 1, 2011	3.43
Jenelle and Kieffer ask Barbara if they can move in with her. Chelsea’s dad strains her to have Adam to find a job. Kailyn starts dating her ex without telling Jo. Leah and Corey put their wedding on hold to bring Ali in for an MRI.
9	9	"Slippery Slope"	March 8, 2011	3.71
Jo confronts Kailyn about dating Jordan behind his back and she moves in with her mom. Leah and Corey plan for their wedding when they get good news about Ali. Jenelle and Kieffer plan to run off to New Jersey. Things between Chelsea and Adam crumble.
10	10	"Two Steps Forward"	March 15, 2011	4.52
Leah and Corey fight when she reconsiders the wedding. Chelsea breaks up with Adam and celebrates with friends by going to a Lady Gaga concert. Jenelle and Kieffer enjoy themselves in New Jersey until Barbara realizes her credit cards are missing. Kailyn settles into life at her mom's house, but can't get her belongings back from Jo.
11	11	"One Step Back"	March 22, 2011	4.39
Chelsea attempts to stay busy by studying for her GED, but gets distracted when she meets a new guy. Jenelle faces the consequences of taking her mom’s credit cards. Kailyn focuses on college and files for a custody agreement with Jo. Having to take Ali to another doctor only days before their wedding, Corey and Leah get closer.
12	12	"Judgement Day"	March 29, 2011	4.59
Chelsea plans for Aubree's 1st birthday, while Randy tries to keep Adam from coming. Jenelle is arrested for breaking and entering, and sees Kieffer as a bad influence when he leaves her alone while he left with a friend but ends up baling him out. Kailyn signs a custody agreement. Leah and Corey get married.

=== Season 2 (2011–12) ===
No. overall	No. in season	Title	Original release date	US viewers (millions)
13	1	"Best Laid Plans"	December 6, 2011	4.15
Jenelle is back with Kieffer after bailing him out of jail. Leah feels isolated and decides to get a job. Chelsea struggles with whether to give Adam another chance. Kailyn and Jordan take Isaac trick or treating.
14	2	"Curveball"	December 13, 2011	3.41
Leah is devastated when she finds out Ali must be sedated for an MRI. Jenelle is living in her car with Kieffer. Chelsea gives Adam another chance but re-tears her ACL. Kailyn can't afford to live on her own.
15	3	"Intensive Care"	December 20, 2011	3.29
Kailyn moves out without telling her mom. Jenelle files charges against Kieffer. Chelsea relies on Adam to take care of Aubree while she recovers from surgery. Corey and Leah get emotional during Ali's MRI.
16	4	"No Looking Back"	December 27, 2011	3.42
Ali's MRI comes back negative to the relief of Leah. Jenelle juggles finding peace with her mom and dealing with Kieffer's domestic charges. Kailyn tries a new form of birth control. Chelsea fends for herself after surgery.
17	5	"Home for Christmas"	January 3, 2012	3.76
Kailyn adjusts to being alone for the holidays. Jenelle regrets filing charges against Kieffer. Leah works to make the holidays special for the twins. Chelsea and Adam make up, but Randy bans Adam from the holiday celebration.
18	6	"Lean on Me"	January 10, 2012	3.11
Ali may have a genetic disorder. Jenelle and Kieffer must face court for their breaking and entering charges. Chelsea finds out that her old friend is pregnant. Kailyn gets annoyed when she notices Jo's not around for Isaac.
19	7	"Breaking Point"	January 10, 2012	3.11
Kieffer is upset that Jenelle hung out with an old boyfriend. Leah is relieved that Ali has no major genetic disorder. Adam slips back into his old ways, much to the dismay of Chelsea. Kailyn considers filing for child support.
20	8	"Making Moves"	January 17, 2012	3.35
Jenelle moves in with her best friend Tori after fighting with Barbara, and Kieffer reenters the picture. Chelsea's relationship with Adam is going downhill fast. Ali may still have a genetic problem. Jo confronts Kailyn about filing for child support and they get into a big argument about who is the more responsible parent.
21	9	"The Beginning of the End"	January 24, 2012	3.90
Jenelle fights with both Kieffer and Tori. Chelsea struggles to deal with Adam breaking up with her. Leah is livid when Corey wants to buy a truck instead of moving. Jo appeals Kailyn's child support request.
22	10	"Love Comes and Goes"	January 31, 2012	3.35
Kailyn's child support hearing is postponed and Jo meets Jordan for the first time. Jenelle has her day in court for the breaking and entering and possession of marijuana charges. Chelsea struggles to get over Adam. Leah makes plans to move without Corey's knowledge.
23	11	"Falling"	February 7, 2012	4.08
Jenelle decides to go to rehab. Chelsea finds a GED class at a local college, goes in for a consultation, and takes her first practice test. Leah files for divorce in order to protect her custody rights. Jo visits Isaac during the week and Kailyn hooks up with Jo, even though she's still with Jordan.
24	12	"Love Will Tear Us Apart"	February 14, 2012	3.45
Corey arranges visitation with the girls while Leah moves her stuff out of Corey's house. Jenelle finds out she might be bipolar while in rehab. Chelsea decides to take the GED test. Kailyn confesses her hook up with Jo.

=== Season 3 (2012–13) ===
No. overall	No. in season	Title	Original release date	US viewers (millions)
25	1	"Walk the Line"	November 12, 2012	3.40
Leah struggles with her pending divorce. Chelsea starts hanging out with Adam again. Jenelle is trying to stay clean on probation. Kailyn realizes she wants to get back together with Jo.
26	2	"Keeping Hope Alive"	November 19, 2012	2.35
Leah and Corey go to mediation over custody of the girls. Chelsea and Adam take a big step forward. Jenelle fails a drug test. Kailyn tries to connect with her estranged mother.
27	3	"Things Come to an End"	November 27, 2012	2.61
Leah and Corey finalize their divorce. Randy finds out that Adam is living with Chelsea. Jenelle goes against her lawyer's advice. Kailyn finds a picture of Jo and his girlfriend online.
28	4	"Life Goes On"	December 3, 2012	2.32
Leah visits the university to get into a nursing program. Chelsea is invited to Dierks Bentley concert by her friend to get her mind off Adam. Jenelle pays the price for her probation. Kailyn takes Jo to court to change their custody agreement.
29	5	"Second Chances"	December 10, 2012	2.37
Leah meets a cute boy named Jeremy. Chelsea and Adam officially call it quits. Jenelle faces jail time. Kailyn and Jordan start having issues.
30	6	"A Leap of Faith"	December 17, 2012	2.22
Leah and Jeremy make their relationship official. Chelsea's friend convinces her to give therapy a try. Jenelle meets a new boy named Josh. Kailyn hopes that there is a chance for her to be with Jo instead of Jordan.
31	7	"Building Blocks"	December 24, 2012	1.13
Corey has second thoughts about the divorce causing Leah to question her new relationship. Chelsea visits a beauty school she wants to attend. Jenelle decides to move in with Josh. Kailyn plans to visit her family in Texas.
32	8	"Caught in the Middle"	January 7, 2013	1.78
Leah tells Jeremy about her confusion with Corey. Chelsea tries to get back on track with school. Things fall apart with Jenelle because she moved in quickly with Josh. Kailyn goes to Texas, and reconnects with her cousin and half sister.
33	9	"A New Direction"	January 14, 2013	2.18
Leah chooses Jeremy and finds a bigger house to move into. Chelsea's dog Frankie tragically dies. Jenelle breaks up with Josh and moves in with her friend. Kailyn learns that her mom Suzi visited Isaac behind her back, and tells Jo that she's thinking of moving to Texas.
34	10	"Half Empty Half Full"	January 21, 2013	2.57
Leah plans a 2nd birthday party for the girls. Chelsea convinces Randy to help her move into a new place. Kieffer comes crashing back into Jenelle's life. Kailyn meets a cute new boy named Javi.
35	11	"Breakdown"	January 28, 2013	2.94
Leah and Jeremy get serious. Chelsea breaks down on Adam's birthday. Jenelle questions if Andrew is really Jace's father. Kailyn is asked out on a date.
36	12	"A Means to an End"	February 4, 2013	3.37
Leah has some big news for Corey. Chelsea gets ready for beauty school. Jenelle goes through with the paternity test. Kailyn and Jo get into a huge fight over his new girlfriend.

=== Season 4 (2013) ===
No. overall	No. in season	Title	Original release date	US viewers (millions)
37	1	"Under Pressure"	February 18, 2013	2.65
Jenelle and her new boyfriend Gary get serious, but Kieffer crawls back into the picture after he's released from jail. Kailyn gets a Protection from Abuse order against Jo after a fight of theirs turns physical. Chelsea worries she might be pregnant again after a one-night stand with Adam. Leah suffers a miscarriage and decides to slow things down with Jeremy.
38	2	"Love Hurts"	February 25, 2013	2.55
Kailyn and Jo go to court to deal with the Protection from Abuse order that she charged him with. Jenelle discovers that Gary slept with Tori before they started dating. After dealing with the unfortunate miscarriage, Leah finds herself in an uncomfortable position with Jeremy and she tells Corey about her feelings. Chelsea attends her first day at beauty school.
39	3	"The Future Is Now"	March 4, 2013	2.46
After getting blown off by Adam, Chelsea is relieved when she finds out that she's not pregnant. Jenelle finally finishes her probation. Kailyn deals with Jo for the first time since she issued the order against him. Leah is torn between Jeremy and Corey, ultimately deciding to give things with the twins' father one last chance.
40	4	"Faded Love"	March 11, 2013	2.50
Jenelle ends up getting back together with Kieffer, and decides to get breast implant surgery. Chelsea gets back on birth control to avoid another pregnancy scare. Kailyn attempts to revise her custody agreement for the second time, but the judge sides against her. Jeremy and Corey have a heart-to-heart about Jeremy's intentions with Leah.
41	5	"So Hard to Say Goodbye"	March 18, 2013	2.43
Jenelle gets breast implant surgery and has an argument with Kieffer after he finds out that Gary sent her "Get Well" flowers, resulting in Kieffer getting kicked out. Leah and Jeremy get their engagement back on. Kailyn and Javi take the next step by moving in together. Overwhelmed by the stresses in her life, Chelsea contemplates moving away from Sioux Falls to get away from everything.
42	6	"Fall to Pieces"	March 25, 2013	2.59
Jenelle rekindles her relationship with Gary, but angers Barbara when she blows off babysitting to get high. Kailyn has a violent outburst directed at Javi, and the two try to work things out. Chelsea learns that Adam has a new girlfriend. Leah and Jeremy contemplate getting married early at a courthouse in order to get a loan for a house they want to buy.
43	7	"For Better or for Worse"	April 1, 2013	2.47
Leah and Jeremy have a small, but happy wedding at the courthouse. Kailyn and Javi start to discuss their future. Adam attempts to make Chelsea jealous of his new relationship. Gary proposes to Jenelle.
44	8	"Don't Be Cruel"	April 1, 2013	2.28
A domestic violence incident between Gary and Jenelle sends them both to jail. Kailyn and Javi contemplate getting married while on a vacation in Las Vegas. Chelsea discusses Adam's legal letter with her lawyer and is advised not to have contact. Leah and Corey go to court to discuss child support payments, and she surprises him by asking for more money than she verbally agreed to.
45	9	"Sweet Dreams"	April 8, 2013	2.54
Chelsea chooses to take a month off from school to deal with everything on her plate. Leah contacts her estranged father, and asks him to walk her down the aisle at her formal wedding. Jenelle goes to court to face the charges from the altercation with Gary. After Javi takes his Air Force test, Kailyn discusses plans with him for marriage.
46	10	"For Love and Money"	April 15, 2013	2.12
Jenelle and Kieffer attends Jace's small third birthday party, and Jenelle's new money issues spark a new fight with Barbara. Leah and Jeremy have their big wedding on a beach in Myrtle Beach. Javi proposes to Kailyn. Chelsea goes out for a night on the town to celebrate her 21st birthday with her closest friends.
47	11	"Hard Knocks"	April 22, 2013	2.52
Chelsea celebrates Aubree's third birthday. Jenelle's small chances of gaining custody of Jace are shown. Leah takes Ali to a doctors appointment. Kailyn has to inform Jo about her future with Javi.
48	12	"The End of the Road"	April 29, 2013	2.67
Barbara tries to have Jenelle committed for using drugs. Chelsea returns to beauty school. Kailyn and Javi get married at the courthouse. Ali endures medical tests.

=== Season 5 (2014) ===
No. overall	No. in season	Title	Original release date	US viewers (millions)
50	1	"Revelations"	January 21, 2014	2.75
Jenelle finds out she's pregnant and makes a decision to abort her pregnancy. Kailyn has her baby shower. Leah has a difficult time coping with Ali's latest diagnosis. Chelsea receives word that Adam is the father of another child.
51	2	"Love Will Never Do Without You"	January 28, 2014	2.40
Jenelle recovers from her abortion and meets a new guy. Chelsea has her first day at esthetician school. Kailyn and Jo fight over her move to Delaware with Javi. Leah goes on vacation, but argues with Jeremy about his upcoming job.
52	3	"Keep Your Head Up"	February 4, 2014	2.49
Leah learns that Ali will need to use a wheelchair. Kailyn and Jo argue about Isaac's scheduled drop off because Jo is late. Jenelle and her new boyfriend Nathan decide to move in together. Chelsea attends Aubree's preschool orientation with Adam.
53	4	"Working Overtime"	February 11, 2014	2.06
Chelsea allows Adam to pick up Aubree from preschool. Kailyn and Javi go house hunting and put in an offer. Jenelle moves in with Nathan. Leah confronts Corey about his denial of Ali's condition.
54	5	"You Got Me"	February 18, 2014	2.40
Jenelle and Nathan discuss having a child together. Corey comes to terms with Ali being in a wheelchair. Kailyn and Javi move into their new home. Chelsea decides to celebrate turning 22.
55	6	"False Positives"	February 25, 2014	2.22
Kailyn and Jo attend court once again. Jenelle thinks that she's pregnant. Chelsea throws Aubree a party for her birthday. Jeremy is taken home after he collapses at work.
56	7	"These Are the Days"	March 4, 2014	2.11
Leah, Jeremy, and Corey discuss how Ali is going to handle attending school. Kailyn plans for her wedding. Chelsea lets Aubree meet Adam's baby. Jenelle receives word from her lawyer that a plea bargain could save her from jail.
57	8	"Breakdown"	March 11, 2014	2.21
Ali goes to school. Adam has a visitation request for Chelsea. Nathan and Barbara get into an altercation. Kailyn tries on her wedding dress.
58	9	"Miss You Much"	March 18, 2014	1.86
Jenelle and Barbara fight at Jace's birthday party. Kailyn is informed that her mother will not attend the wedding. Chelsea takes Aubree to her first dance class. Leah and Jeremy argue over his job.
59	10	"We Belong Together"	March 25, 2014	2.17
Kailyn and Javi finally celebrate their wedding. Chelsea graduates from esthetician school. Jenelle accepts her plea bargain. Leah is furious when Jeremy rejects a local job offer.
60	11	"Out of the Blue"	April 1, 2014	2.17
Kailyn receives a surprise phone call from her mom. Chelsea gets more visitation papers from Adam. Leah struggles being away from Jeremy. Jenelle takes a pregnancy test.
61	12	"What You See Is Not What You Get"	April 8, 2014	2.15
Kailyn goes into labor. Chelsea has a difficult time agreeing on a visitation schedule for Aubree. Leah and Jeremy work on their marriage. Nathan gets in trouble.
62	13	"That's the Way Love Goes"	April 13, 2014	1.81
Javi has to return to work, leaving Kailyn with the kids. Jo ends up finding a new apartment. Jenelle and Nathan's relationship continues to spiral downward. Chelsea takes her board exam. Leah learns about Ali's rare condition.
Part 2
63	14	"Keep It Together"	July 16, 2014	2.20
Ali becomes aware of muscular dystrophy. Jenelle and Nathan learn the gender of their child. Kailyn struggles to raise two children and maintain her marriage. Chelsea receives unexpected news from South Dakota's Department of Labor & Regulation.
64	15	"When Everything Seems Wrong"	July 23, 2014	2.19
Jenelle deals with Nathan's upcoming jail time. Chelsea moves into her new house. Leah struggles to balance work and family life. Kailyn decides to invite both Jo and his girlfriend Vee to Isaac's birthday celebration.
65	16	"Overload"	July 30, 2014	1.82
Leah starts taking medication to deal with anxiety. Kailyn and Javi visit Jo and Vee's apartment for the first time. Nathan prepares for jail and Jenelle worries about being alone. Chelsea meets with a lawyer.
66	17	"Harder than It Looks"	August 6, 2014	1.77
Jenelle struggles with being on her own and taking care of Jace while Nathan is away. Leah and Jeremy clash over finances. Chelsea investigates Adam's legal charges from his car accident. Kailyn celebrates her birthday.
67	18	"I'll Be Missing You"	August 13, 2014	1.95
Leah and Jeremy visit Ali's specialist. Jenelle and Nathan reunite. Chelsea receives news about Adam and her new job. Kailyn struggles with loneliness after Javi leaves for a work trip.
68	19	"Family Matters"	August 20, 2014	1.81
Kailyn's estranged mom re-enters the picture. Chelsea faces Adam at Aubree's t-ball practice. Corey's dad helps Leah with Ali's temporary wheelchair. Jenelle starts the process to get divorced from Courtland.
69	20	"Bad Behavior"	August 27, 2014	1.72
Adam is arrested again and Chelsea has to deal with the consequences. Leah tries to manage the growing jealousy between the twins. Nathan and Barbara clash. Kailyn explains Javi's absence to Isaac.
70	21	"Cabin Fever"	September 3, 2014	1.55
Jenelle and Barbara butt heads over Jace's behavior issues. Kailyn struggles to get two cranky kids ready for Javi's return home. Leah decides to take Corey to court. Chelsea hears about Adam's new girlfriend.
71	22	"Summer Daze, Summertime Sadness"	September 10, 2014	1.83
Kailyn and Jo disagree over Isaac's upcoming visitation schedule. Chelsea comes face to face with Adam's new girlfriend Jessica. Arguments with both Nathan and Barbara throw Jenelle's baby shower into question. Leah and Corey's custody battle escalates.
72	23	"Co-Parenthood"	September 17, 2014	1.88
Jenelle's second son, Kaiser, is born. Leah discovers that Corey wants full custody of the girls. Kailyn get emotional when Isaac leaves for summer visitation with Jo. Adam's ex reenters the picture, shocking Chelsea.
73	24	"Wish You Were Here"	September 24, 2014	1.35
Leah and Corey face each other in court. Kailyn and Javi adjust to life without Isaac. Chelsea deals with another of Adam's arrests. Jenelle tries to build a family for both Jace and Kaiser.
74	25	"All Grown Up"	October 1, 2014	1.89
Jenelle approaches Barbara about getting custody of Jace. Kailyn is reunited with Isaac, but gets offended when Jo brings up a sensitive subject. Chelsea tries to move on romantically as Adam goes to jail. Leah takes Ali to her doctor's appointment in Columbus, where Ali gets approved for her new wheelchair.

=== Season 6 (2015) ===
No. overall	No. in season	Title	Original release date	US viewers (millions)
75	1	"Keep It Moving"	July 9, 2015	1.95
In the Season 6 premiere, Javi is upset by something he finds on Kailyn's phone. Adam wants shared custody of Aubree, which shocks Chelsea. With her marriage to Jeremy on the rocks, Leah has to face Corey in court for custody of their daughters. Jenelle makes plans to hire a lawyer to fight for custody of Jace.
76	2	"Shakedown"	July 16, 2015	1.41
Leah takes a court-ordered drug test. Chelsea and Adam's ex, Taylor, fight his custody request. Kailyn and Javi's issues come to a head when she spends a night with friends. Jenelle and Nathan go on vacation to St. Thomas and while there, Nathan proposes to Jenelle.
77	3	"No Apologies"	July 23, 2015	1.67
Chelsea and Adam retain lawyers for their custody battle. Jenelle's chance of gaining custody of Jace is threatened by her explosive arguments with Nathan. Corey wants more time with the girls, and Leah and Jeremy's marriage falls apart. Kailyn and Javi go to counseling to discuss trust issues.
78	4	"Not Good Enough"	July 30, 2015	1.42
Despite efforts to get along, Leah and Corey's co-parenting relationship takes a turn for the worse. Barbara and Jace visit Jenelle for the first time in weeks. Kailyn and Javi discuss the future about their marriage. Aubree has a hard time to adjusting to life after being at Adam's house and is misbehaving at preschool.
79	5	"Can't Trust Them"	August 6, 2015	1.44
After filing for full custody of Jace, Jenelle clashes with Barbara. Kailyn's marital problems with Javi worsen when she goes on a weekend trip to L.A. with her friend Sterling and her family. Chelsea and Taylor's custody hearings with Adam heat up. Leah meets with her lawyer to discuss the twins' visitation schedule with Corey.
80	6	"Walk Out"	August 13, 2015	1.36
Chelsea hears worrisome news about Taylor that could impact on her court case with Adam. When Jeremy threatens divorce, Leah begins to fall apart emotionally. Nathan's behavior causes Jenelle to rethink their engagement. Things are still tense between Kailyn and Javi, especially during a day trip to Philadelphia.
81	7	"Wanna Love You"	August 20, 2015	1.64
After an altercation with Jenelle, Nathan gets arrested. Divorce papers from Jeremy cause Leah to reach her breaking point. Chelsea and Adam face each other in court. Kailyn takes a birthday vacation while Jo and Vee move closer to Kailyn and her family.
82	8	"What Makes You Happy"	August 27, 2015	1.71
Jenelle pleads with Nathan to stay together. Kailyn fears that Jo's move is too close for comfort. Leah, who's overwhelmed by a looming divorce and custody threats, makes a big decision. Chelsea and her boyfriend Cole adopt a pig.
83	9	"Run Away"	September 3, 2015	1.77
Leah returns from therapy. Jenelle and Nathan struggle with their co-parenting arrangement. Kailyn and Javi adjust to Jo and Vee living nearby. Chelsea and Cole get Aubree ready for her preschool graduation.
84	10	"Expect a Miracle"	September 10, 2015	N/A
Kailyn is torn between Javi and Jo. Leah finalizes her divorce and prepares to return to therapy. Jenelle and Barbara meet in court to discuss custody of Jace. Chelsea and Cole decide to move in together.
85	11	"Sorry Not Sorry"	September 17, 2015	N/A
Jenelle may face felony charges after a fight with Nathan and his new girlfriend. Chelsea notices Adam's actions are impacting Aubree. Kailyn is beside herself when Jo goes missing. Leah officially ends her marriage with Jeremy.
86	12	"Face Off"	September 24, 2015	1.52
Jo is upset by Kailyn's threats of legal action. Leah returns from treatment. Jenelle faces the consequences for her behavior. Cole moves in with Chelsea.

=== Season 7 (2016–17) ===
No. overall	No. in season	Title	Original release date	US viewers (millions)
87	1	"Here We Go Again"	March 21, 2016	1.75
In the Season 7 premiere, Nathan threatens Jenelle with felony charges. Leah receives sad news about Ali while waiting on the decision in her custody case. Kailyn tries to rebuild her relationship with Jo, but hurts things with Javi. Chelsea faces Adam on Aubree's first day of kindergarten.
88	2	"In the Dark"	March 28, 2016	1.75
When Nathan takes Kaiser on an unexpected trip, Jenelle tries to charge him with kidnapping. Leah anxiously awaits the news from court about her custody case. Kailyn gets surprising news about Javi's job. Adam threatens to take Chelsea back to court for custody of Aubree.
89	3	"Breaking Apart"	April 4, 2016	1.56
Leah learns the outcome of her custody case. Kailyn and Jo's renewed friendship is threatened by a huge fight. Jenelle introduces her new boyfriend David to Barbara. Chelsea is upset by Adam's online behavior.
90	4	"Iced Out"	April 10, 2016	1.28
Kailyn and Javi learn that he will be deployed overseas for six months. Leah is upset with Corey for confusing the girls about the custody arrangement. Barbara worries about David. Chelsea and Cole go on vacation to Puerto Rico.
91	5	"No Access"	April 11, 2016	1.60
Cole proposes to Chelsea. Kailyn reveals a huge secret that's been weighing on her and Javi. Jenelle faces the assault charges against her. Corey and Miranda's daughter, Remi, is born early and Leah tries to help out.
92	6	"Hindsight"	April 18, 2016	1.65
Leah considers reuniting with Jeremy. Issac struggles with Javi's impending deployment. Jenelle's birthday trip to New York City is ruined by Nathan. Chelsea and Cole celebrate their engagement.
93	7	"Man of the House"	April 25, 2016	1.57
Javi says goodbye to his family prior to his deployment. Jenelle meets with Nathan, which fuels David's jealousy. Leah and Corey face off at Ali's doctor appointment. Chelsea and Cole debate changing Aubree's last name.
94	8	"Didn't Mean It"	May 2, 2016	N/A
Leah and Corey battle in court over custody of the twins. Jenelle agrees to let Nathan see Kaiser. Kailyn struggles to help Isaac, who misses Javi. Chelsea and Cole look at wedding venues.
95	9	"While You Were Out"	May 16, 2016	N/A
Barbara and David argue about Jenelle, leading to a 911 call. Aubree gets glasses. Kailyn and Javi struggle with his deployment. Leah receives troubling news about the custody case.
96	10	"Choose Your Battles"	May 23, 2016	N/A
Kailyn works on her relationship with Vee. Cole escorts Aubree to her father/daughter dance. Jenelle seeks help in New York for mysterious medical ailments. Leah and Corey's co-parenting is shattered by a disturbing video.
97	11	"Turn the Page"	May 30, 2016	N/A
Jenelle's medical problems lead to a fight with Barbara. Leah and Miranda make amends. Aubree asks Adam a big question. Kailyn rebuilds her relationship with Jo while distancing herself from Javi.
98	12	"Gone Fishing"	June 6, 2016	N/A
In the season finale, an emotional meltdown over Barbara ruins Jenelle's fun day with her sons. Kailyn and Javi's marriage is dangerously close to a divorce. Chelsea celebrates milestones with Aubree. Just when Leah and Corey start to get along, her relationship with Jeremy crumbles.
Part 2
99	13	"Breaking the Wall"	January 2, 2017	N/A
Jenelle faces Nathan and his girlfriend in court for her assault trial. Aubree goes dress shopping for Chelsea and Cole's wedding, while Adam airs some frustrations. Kailyn goes skydiving to cope with her marital issues with Javi. Jeremy has to leave town for a new job for three to four months, much to Addie and Leah's dismay.
100	14	"Deja Vu"	January 9, 2017	N/A
Leah struggles with Addie missing her dad. Chelsea meets with Adam's ex, Taylor. Jenelle and Nathan face off in court over custody of Kaiser. Kailyn starts summer school with some extra help from Jo.
101	15	"100"	January 11, 2017	N/A
Chelsea and Cole share with Aubree that she's pregnant. Kailyn and Javi decide to get a divorce. Leah buys a new home for herself and the girls, one that would help Ali use her wheelchair more. Jenelle goes on her first vacation with Jace.
102	16	"Homecoming"	January 16, 2017	N/A
Javi returns home from deployment to mixed reactions. After a flood hits West Virginia, Leah and Jeremy have trouble communicating. Chelsea hopes that her doctor's visit goes well so she can finally make the baby announcement. Jenelle receives a call from Barbara about Jace, leading to a huge fight.
103	17	"Privacy Please"	January 23, 2017	N/A
Jenelle and David keep some big news a secret. Kailyn and Javi struggle with adjusting to their new relationship. Jeremy isn't happy about Leah's vacation plans. Chelsea finds out that Adam is behind on child support.
104	18	"Heartache"	January 30, 2017	N/A
Kailyn and Javi get into a fight after he shows up unannounced. Jenelle tries to hide her pregnancy from Barbara. Chelsea and Cole question postponing their wedding. Leah learns that the twins' school will be closed as a result of the flooding in West Virginia and reaches out to Corey for help in picking another school for them.
105	19	"Last to Know"	February 6, 2017	N/A
Jenelle reveals her pregnancy to Barbara and Jace. However, Barbara doesn't take the news too well. Aubree starts first grade while Chelsea meets with her wedding planner to discuss moving the wedding reception to one year later. Jo co-parents Isaac with both Kailyn and Javi. Leah and her daughters go on a girls trip to California.
106	20	"Fake Out"	February 13, 2017	N/A
Leah receives some surprising news from Ali's doctor about Aleeah. Jenelle thinks Nathan is trying to win her back and David isn't having it. Kailyn and Isaac start school, but the added pressure causes strife between Jo and Vee. Chelsea celebrates her bachelorette party with her friends.
107	21	"I Don't Wanna Talk About It"	February 20, 2017	N/A
Jenelle learns that Nathan was arrested for burglary and domestic violence. Chelsea celebrates Aubree's 7th birthday. Jeremy returns home from South Dakota, and Leah gets advice from her grandma on co-parenting Addie with him. Kailyn and Javi's future is up in the air.
108	22	"Low Blows"	February 27, 2017	N/A
Divorce mediation leads to arguments outside the courtroom for Kailyn and Javi. Chelsea officially reveals her baby's gender. Leah finds out that Jeremy is engaged. Jenelle and Barbara attend a court hearing regarding custody of Jace.
109	23	"Ready or Not"	March 6, 2017	N/A
Jenelle reaches her boiling point with Barbara. Chelsea and Cole get a fake baby, so he could have practice parenting with a baby. Kailyn and Javi continue to clash. Leah is forced to make a tough decision about beauty school.
110	24	"Cherries and Flowers"	March 13, 2017	N/A
Chelsea and Cole tie the knot. Kailyn and Javi try to make amends. Leah prepares for a new chapter in her life. Kaiser starts preschool while Nathan shares shocking news.

=== Season 8 (2017–18) ===
No. overall	No. in season	Title	Original release date	US viewers (millions)
111	1	"And Then There Were Five"	July 17, 2017	1.49
Briana, reunites with an old friend but grapples with an unplanned pregnancy. A sudden move tests Jenelle and David's relationship. Kailyn and Javi finalize their divorce while Leah begins an exciting new chapter. Chelsea gives birth to her son, Watson Cole.
112	2	"Down That Route"	July 24, 2017	1.34
Briana is faced with a heart-wrenching decision. Kailyn’s friend reveals some very personal information. Jenelle and Nathan confront each other in court. Leah tries to reunite Addie with Jeremy. Chelsea brings home baby Watson.
113	3	"Low Key"	July 31, 2017	1.58
Kailyn finally discusses the big news that she's been hiding. Briana starts exploring adoption. Aubree has some trouble adjusting to her baby brother. Addie's birthday party doesn't go as planned. Jenelle reconciles with Barbara in time for her baby shower.
114	4	"Surprise!"	July 31, 2017	0.94
Jeremy shocks Leah with some unexpected news. Javi gets information on Kailyn's pregnancy. After their daughter is born, David plans another big surprise for Jenelle. Aubree's school has a father/daughter dance. Briana and Luis meet to discuss adoption for their baby.
115	5	"Lips Don't Lie"	August 7, 2017	1.41
Leah investigates a business opportunity, but Ali struggles with her illness. Kailyn faces Javi in court over the PFA. Chelsea hears disturbing news about Adam. Jace meets his baby sister, Ensley, and Jenelle announces her engagement. Briana meets with Nova's dad and they decide that their daughter needs to spend more time with her dad's side of the family.
116	6	"Unfinished Sentences"	August 14, 2017	1.33
Leah faces a difficult decision about college. Jenelle and David hit the rocks while setting up their new home. Briana pursues adoption further. Chelsea worries about Aubree at Adam's parents' house. Kailyn struggles to get back on track at school.
117	7	"Motherducker"	August 21, 2017	1.36
Kailyn is furious when her pregnancy is leaked. Briana's mom confronts Luis about the new baby. Aubree gets overexcited about Chelsea's new pets. Ali makes a heartbreaking confession to Leah. Jace spends his first weekend at Jenelle's new house.
118	8	"On the Hunt"	August 28, 2017	1.29
After Barb refuses to let Jace come over, Jenelle tracks her down. Briana gives Luis an ultimatum. Kailyn and Javi are forced to face each other at Lincoln’s soccer practice. Chelsea and Cole catch baby fever. Leah tries to find answers for Ali.
119	9	"Playing Family Picnic"	September 4, 2017	1.31
Jenelle has a tumultuous mother's day when she's barred from seeing Jace; Briana is under pressure while preparing for her baby shower; Kailyn is shocked when Javi files for child support; Leah and Ali visit the doctor.
120	10	"Welcome to a Puerto Rican Baby Shower"	September 11, 2017	1.35
Luis shows up at Briana's baby shower; Jenelle gets her day in court; Kailyn juggles school, the boys, Javi and Jo; Chelsea and Aubree have a girls day.
121	11	"Swiping and Griping"	September 18, 2017	1.30
Jenelle and Barb come to an agreement; Briana receives surprising news from Luis; Leah enters the dating world; Aubree visits Adam; Jo pursues custody of Isaac.
122	12	"Somewhere Else"	September 20, 2017	1.00
Leah pushes Jeremy to spend more time with Addie; Chelsea reconsiders her visitation agreement with Adam's parents; Jenelle wants a special weekend with Jace.
123	13	"Winter in Summer"	September 25, 2017	1.21
Luis asks Briana a question before she goes into labor; Barb tries to make peace with Jenelle; Kailyn prepares for her graduation; Chelsea takes her family on a trip.
124	14	"Oh, the Places You'll Go"	October 2, 2017	1.05
Kailyn graduates from college; a fight between Briana's family and Luis ruins Stella's homecoming; Leah takes another shot at motivational speaking; Jenelle shops for wedding dresses.
125	15	"Love You, Mean It"	October 9, 2017	1.23
Briana rushes Stella to the hospital. An unexpected court date threatens Kailyn's vacation. Leah and Corey notice Gracie may need special attention. Chelsea attempts to modify Aubree's custody agreement.
126	16	"Emotional Roller Coaster"	October 16, 2017	N/A
Kailyn's vacation to Saint Thomas takes a turn. Briana learns news about Stella. Jace's eighth birthday leads to more tension between Jenelle and Barb. Leah juggles giving enough attention to both the twins.
127	17	"In Sod We Trust"	October 30, 2017	N/A
Tensions build as Jenelle prepares for her wedding day; Kailyn faces the potential of raising her third baby alone; Briana attempts to involve Devoin more in Nova's life; and Chelsea tries on her wedding dress.
128	18	"The Ties That Bind"	November 6, 2017	N/A
In the season finale, Jenelle walks down the aisle; Chelsea celebrates; Leah tries to get Addie ready for preschool; Kailyn has her baby.
Part 2
129	19	"Not to Stir the Pot, but..."	May 7, 2018	N/A
Briana reveals surprising news about Javi to Leah, Jenelle risks losing custody of Kaiser, and Adam is arrested again, forcing Chelsea to rethink visitation.
130	20	"Drama's for Nerds, Pt. 1"	May 14, 2018	N/A
All the women travel to Los Angeles to film the reunion and specials, and Leah feels caught in the middle as tensions between Kailyn and Briana run high.
131	21	"Drama's for Nerds, Pt. 2"	May 21, 2018	N/A
Kailyn continues arguing with Briana and Brittany, and Jenelle and David walk away during the reunion taping but later return to face off with Nathan, Doris and Barb.
132	22	"The Hangover"	May 28, 2018	N/A
Jenelle gets a troubling call from Jace and decides to dial 911 on Barbara. Javi visits Briana in Orlando as their relationship heats up. Leah takes the girls trick-or-treating together. Chelsea is off birth control and ready for another baby.
133	23	"Bitter Baby Mama"	June 4, 2018	N/A
Kailyn and Javi throw separate birthday parties for Lincoln, Chelsea heads to court with her ex, Leah takes Gracie to therapy, and Nathan's text to Jenelle angers David.
134	24	"Unicorn Poop"	June 11, 2018	N/A
Leah gets a surprising call from Jeremy during the twins' birthday, Kailyn goes to court with Lux's dad, and Jenelle takes a birthday vacation with all her kids.
135	25	"Quicksand"	June 18, 2018	N/A
Leah contemplates getting back together with Jeremy, Javi drops a bomb on Briana and Kailyn, and Chelsea struggles to have a good relationship with Adam's mom.
136	26	"Access Issues"	June 25, 2018	N/A
Briana feels rushed by Javi, the police visit Jenelle and David's house, Chelsea has big news, Kailyn deals with Isaac's custody, and Leah takes care of unexpected guests.
137	27	"Thirsty"	July 2, 2018	N/A
Briana and Javi make major decisions about their relationship, and Leah grows concerned as Ali's health issues become more obvious at school.
138	28	"Forgot About Dre"	July 9, 2018	N/A
Javi gets jealous when Briana calls on an ex to take care of her after surgery, Leah and Jeremy reconnect, and Aubree and Cole attend a father-daughter dance.
139	29	"Trouble in Paradise"	July 16, 2018	N/A
Javi travels to Miami to see Briana, Kailyn and Leah go to Hawaii, Chelsea and Aubree meet up with Taylor and Adam's daughter Paislee, and Nathan and Barbara discuss Jenelle.
140	30	"Road Rage"	July 23, 2018	N/A
Jenelle encounters an aggressive driver while taking Jace home. Briana has some surprise visitors after surgery. Chelsea and Cole check out the center where Adam will see Aubree. Leah gets troubling news. Kailyn and Jo go back to court.
141	31	"On the Mend"	July 30, 2018	N/A
Briana faces DeVoin as she heals from surgery. After a disheartening doctor’s visit, Leah receives an update on Ali’s condition. Adam violates his visitation agreement. Barb responds to Jenelle's road rage encounter. Kailyn finalizes custody with Jo.

=== Season 9 (2019) ===
No. overall	No. in season	Title	Original release date	US viewers (millions)
142	1	"Dot Dot Dot"	January 14, 2019	1.18
Leah has a new boyfriend, Jenelle and Nathan square off, Chelsea gets disappointing news, Briana makes a big decision, and Kailyn sees Javi's pregnant girlfriend in person.
143	2	"Reconnect"	January 21, 2019	1.13
Jenelle is upset when Jace's father unexpectedly reaches out, Chelsea wonders if Adam can get it together for visitations with Aubree, and Isaac visits Javi's house.
144	3	"Hurricane"	January 28, 2019	1.14
Jenelle makes a shocking call to 911, Kailyn considers reconnecting with her mother, and Chelsea checks into the hospital after experiencing signs of early labor.
145	4	"Don't Wanna Go Home"	February 4, 2019	1.11
Jenelle refuses to appear on camera after her 911 tape leaks, Leah takes Ali to a vital doctor's appointment, Kailyn reconnects with her sister, and Briana visits a new beau.
146	5	"Shutting Down"	February 11, 2019	1.03
Chelsea and Cole welcome their daughter Layne, Barbara grows concerned when Jenelle avoids filming, Leah's home floods, and Briana goes on a camping trip with her new flame.
147	6	"Cry It Out"	February 18, 2019	0.89
Briana faces an emergency, Leah worries about Addie, Chelsea and Cole bring their new baby home, Kailyn plans her sister's baby shower, and Jenelle contemplates her future.
148	7	"Surprise!"	February 25, 2019	0.97
Chelsea learns that Aubree's father gave up custody of his other daughter, Jo files for child support from Kailyn, and Leah's new boyfriend Jason meets Corey.
149	8	"Cold War"	March 4, 2019	1.03
Jenelle undergoes emergency surgery, Briana and Kailyn each confront their exes about child support, and Chelsea is upset when Adam once again flakes on a visit with Aubree.
150	9	"Momster Mash"	March 11, 2019	0.98
Jenelle considers introducing Jace to his dad, Chelsea leaves Layne and Watson alone with Cole for the first time to spend time with Aubree, and Kailyn butts heads with Javi.
151	10	"This Can Go One of Two Ways"	March 18, 2019	1.12
Barbara is frustrated when Jace's dad doesn't show up when she flies out to meet him, Kailyn gets mixed signals from Lux's dad Chris, and Devoin joins Briana on a family trip.
152	11	"Peace Gathering"	March 25, 2019	0.99
Jenelle reignites her feud with Kailyn, Briana is frustrated with Luis' absence, Leah gets an update on Ali's vision, and Chelsea questions how to deal with Adam's parents.
153	12	"Do the Dangle"	April 1, 2019	0.97
Kailyn's haircare line launch brings her closer to her sister, Chelsea manages the stress of having three kids, and Jason steps up to help Leah plan the twins' birthday.
154	13	"Home Is Home"	April 8, 2019	1.03
Jenelle's custody battle continues, Kailyn and Jo head to court, Briana tries to reassure Nova, Leah's home gets an upgrade, and Chelsea and Cole celebrate Aubree's birthday.
155	14	"Something We Said"	April 15, 2019	0.90
Barbara and Jenelle accidentally fuel their feud with Kailyn, Briana throws her boyfriend a surprise birthday party, and Chelsea and Cole land an exciting business opportunity.
156	15	"Bow Down"	April 22, 2019	0.88
Leah's kids reveal their feelings about Jason, Teen Mom OG's Amber calls out Jenelle's feud with Kailyn, someone breaks into Chelsea's home, and Briana's family meets John.
157	16	"He Didn't Look Like A Prince"	April 29, 2019	0.91
Leah makes a decision about Jason, Jenelle has a change in plans, Kailyn spends time with Amber, Chelsea deals with a sick toddler, and Briana lets Luis babysit Stella.
158	17	"Checks and Balances"	May 6, 2019	0.93
Chelsea experiences anxiety after the break-in at her house. Briana's mom plans a family portrait. Addie has questions for Leah and Jeremy.
159	18	"Family Portrait"	May 13, 2019	0.99
Leah and Jeremy take Addie to the emergency room. Nova takes a big step that surprises Briana. Chelsea seeks help for her anxiety. Kailyn's sister gives birth.
Part 2
160	19	"Hey, Girl, Hey"	September 10, 2019	0.81
Nova's stay with Devoin ends poorly. Leah and Jeremy spend a weekend in New York together.
161	20	"Welcome to the Jungle"	September 17, 2019	0.79
Jade attempts to reconcile with Sean. Chelsea and Cole look at buying a new property.
162	21	"Direct Message"	September 24, 2019	0.78
Leah faces another health scare with Addie; Jade and Sean reach a boiling point, forcing her to move out; Briana is torn when she gets a suspicious message about John; Adam surprises Aubree; Lux's father puts Kailyn in a difficult situation.
163	22	"Truth Hurts"	October 1, 2019	0.83
Sean refuses to let Jade get her things from their house, so she goes to the police. Leah gets some shocking news about her sister. Javi and Lauren are rocked by an on-camera revelation from Kailyn. Briana and John visit the Dominican Republic.
164	23	"Walking the Walk"	October 8, 2019	0.83
When Nova misses her dad, Briana puts her anger with Devoin aside. Jade tries to distance herself from Sean but worries how it will affect Kloie. Leah's kids become suspicious of her possible romance with Jeremy. Kailyn reconsiders a move.
165	24	"Make It or Break It"	October 15, 2019	0.69
Sean pleads with Jade to let him see Kloie. Jo throws a wrench into Kailyn's vacation plans while Leah considers what this Hawaii trip could mean for her and Jeremy. Briana wants to take her relationship with John to the next level.
166	25	"Getting Lei'd"	October 22, 2019	0.66
Gracie reveals some deep feelings about Jeremy to Leah while on vacation in Hawaii. Briana celebrates Stella's second birthday, but leaves someone off the guest list. Jade worries her mom is slipping back into old habits.
167	26	"Normal Parents"	October 29, 2019	0.65
Jade's relationship with her mom deteriorates. Things for Briana and John crumble when she visits him in NY. Ali gains independence at a camp for children with muscular dystrophy. Kail celebrates Lux's birthday.
168	27	"Ballout"	November 5, 2019	0.69
When Jade's parents are arrested, she's forced to pick up the pieces. Devoin tries to prove to Briana that he can be around for Nova. Leah welcomes Ali home from camp. Chelsea celebrates her shared birthday with Layne. Kailyn makes a big investment.
169	28	"Sugar-coated Mood"	November 12, 2019	0.75
Briana makes a major decision, leaving John sidelined. With her parents still in jail, Jade reaches to Sean for support. Chelsea's anxiety rises with the launch of her clothing design. Kailyn has a big surprise for the boys. Leah's girls start school.
170	29	"Don't Miss the Sunset"	November 19, 2019	0.74
Luis reappears with a major ask for Briana. Sean's rent is late, forcing Jade to make a difficult choice. Kailyn gets upsetting news about a family pet. Jeremy finally makes dinner plans, but Leah's feelings for him aren't as strong.
171	30	"Bear"	November 26, 2019	0.80
Kailyn and her boys say goodbye to the family dog. Jade takes Sean in with surprising results. Briana confronts John about their deteriorating relationship. Chelsea gets a shocking request from Adam's mom. Leah is reminded of her past with Jeremy.

=== Season 10 (2020–21) ===
No. overall	No. in season	Title	Original release date	US viewers (millions)
172	1	"New Season, Old Wounds"	September 1, 2020	0.81
Briana, frustrated by Luis' absence, tracks him down at a nightclub. After a major fight with her mom, things get even worse for Jade.
173	2	"About Last Night"	September 8, 2020	0.69
Briana returns after a night with Luis. Isaac makes a confession to Kailyn, prompting her to reconsider her custody agreement with Jo.
174	3	"Blood and Water"	September 15, 2020	0.63
Jade's mom asks her for a big favor; Chelsea takes Aubree out for a mother-daughter day.
175	4	"Hello from the Other Side"	September 22, 2020	0.71
Jade graduates beauty school but family complications threaten her big day.
176	5	"Taking Charge"	September 29, 2020	0.68
Briana confronts Luis about her STI test results; Jade is forced to support her family.
177	6	"Where Have You Been?"	October 6, 2020	0.73
An explosive family brawl leaves Jade caught between Sean and her parents. Devoin’s family reappears after being absent for years.
178	7	"Dilemmas and Debacles"	October 13, 2020	0.66
Jade is caught between her mom and Sean, but a drug test could reveal the truth.
179	8	"Impossible Choice"	October 20, 2020	0.75
Jade asks her parents to move out. After an x-ray, Leah grapples with the possibility that Ali’s condition is progressing.
180	9	"Piece of Me"	October 27, 2020	0.54
Kail celebrates Isaac's birthday while life-changing news weighs on her. Leah reveals secrets about her past.
181	10	"Do Something"	November 10, 2020	0.70
The new coronavirus threatens Leah's travel plans and brings up serious concerns for Ali's health.
182	11	"Until the World Ends"	November 17, 2020	0.75
The threat of coronavirus intensifies as Chelsea travels to Los Angeles for work.
183	12	"Remote Control"	November 24, 2020	0.65
Despite quarantine, Leah's book release pushes her and Jeremy to confront their past. Jade is forced to close her salon during lockdown.
184	13	"Not So Normal Times"	November 24, 2020	0.54
As the country deals with quarantine, Briana must decide whether or not to send Nova back to school.
185	14	"Bizarre New World"	December 1, 2020	0.65
Kail gives birth to her fourth child and Chelsea worries about her health amid a COVID-19 scare.
186	15	"Tongue-tied"	December 8, 2020	0.56
Tensions erupt between Jade and Sean at Kloie's birthday dinner. Leah attempts virtual learning with all three girls.
187	16	"Say OK"	December 15, 2020	0.66
Jade's frustrations reach an all-time high, forcing her to break up with Sean.
188	17	"Just Don't Sink It"	December 22, 2020	0.57
Kailyn is forced to navigate the fallout of strong statements she made about Javi and Chelsea struggles with parenting concerns.
189	18	"Under the Big Top"	December 29, 2020	0.60
Chelsea makes a difficult decision about her future. Leah withdraws Gracie from cheer in order to keep Ali safe.
Part 2
190	19	"Spring Has Sprung"	May 4, 2021	0.66
Ashley takes an anniversary trip with Bar, who's got a big surprise.
191	20	"Just Say Yes"	May 11, 2021	0.51
Ashley gives Bar an answer, but past family drama might dampen their dream. A stressful move threatens to sour Jade's fresh start.
192	21	"Level Up"	May 18, 2021	N/A
After a COVID-19 exposure at the girls' school, Leah has to make some difficult decisions.
193	22	"Not Quite"	May 25, 2021	N/A
Sean proposes, but Jade's not sure how to respond. Leah is forced into quarantine when Jeremy tests positive for COVID-19.
194	23	"Full Circle"	June 1, 2021	N/A
Kail invites Devoin on her podcast. Jade decides to get plastic surgery in Miami, so Briana visits to coach her through her anxiety.
195	24	"MIA"	June 8, 2021	N/A
Jade gets plastic surgery but her recovery turns dangerous, and Briana tries to help her as the situation escalates.
196	25	"Mutual Combat"	June 15, 2021	0.55
Jade's recovery gets even rockier when tensions rise between Sean and her parents. Ashley and Bar make a tough wedding decision.
197	26	"Bonded for Life"	June 22, 2021	0.47
Jade plans to fly home, but Briana tries to convince her to come back to Orlando with her instead.
198	27	"Cut Out"	June 29, 2021	0.40
Jade recovers at Briana's house, but has to make a hard decision about her family. Leah tries to balance Ali and Aleeah's needs.
199	28	"On the Shoulders of Giants"	July 6, 2021	0.51
Ashley and Bar grapple racist backlash. Kloie's behavior wedges a divide between Jade and Sean.
200	29	"Backslide"	July 13, 2021	0.48
Jade's career is moving forward, but her relationship with Sean begins to slip.
201	30	"Off the Leash"	July 20, 2021	0.42
Kail faces a court battle with Chris. Bar's DUI resurfaces and threatens to ruin Ashley's graduation party.

=== Season 11 (2022) ===
No. overall	No. in season	Title	Original release date	US viewers (millions)
202	1	"Bless This Mess"	March 8, 2022	0.46
203	2	"ChrisCross"	March 15, 2022	0.39
204	3	"Garlic Breath"	March 22, 2022	0.40
205	4	"Picture Perfect"	March 29, 2022	0.40
206	5	"Officially Official"	April 5, 2022	0.41
207	6	"There's No Crying in Football"	April 12, 2022	0.44
Jade and Kloie reunite with Sean in rehab. Stella has a medical emergency that Briana is forced to navigate with Luis.
208	7	"Natural Mother"	April 19, 2022	0.35
Jade and Sean reignite their spark. Briana is so frustrated by Luis that she reaches out to his parents.
209	8	"Under My Roof"	April 26, 2022	0.36
Kail reveals big news about Chris while Briana becomes overwhelmed by Stella’s father’s absence. Jaylan and Leah make a major move forward.
210	9	"Falling on the Grenade"	May 3, 2022	0.44
Kail and Javi consider reuniting. Ashley supports Bar through his mom’s health concerns. Briana tries to bring Luis and Devoin together for her girls.
211	10	"Run Miles, Not Your Mouth"	May 10, 2022	0.43
Kail makes a public allegation about Briana, so Bri sends her a gift. Jade and Kloie welcome Sean home from rehab.

== Specials ==
Featured season	Title	Original release date
1	"Catching Up with the Girls of Teen Mom 2"	December 28, 2010
1	"Check Up with Dr. Drew"	April 5, 2011
1	"Unseen Moments"	April 12, 2011
2	"Unseen Moments"	February 7, 2012
2	"Check Up with Dr. Drew, Part I"	February 21, 2012
The moms discuss this past season with Dr Drew. Jenelle is joined on stage with Barb. Jenelle talks about rehab and relapsing. Kail is joined by Jo and Jordan to discuss their love triangle.
2	"Check Up with Dr. Drew, Part II"	February 28, 2012
Chelsea is joined by Adam on stage while Leah’s mom Dawn and Corey’s dad Jeff to talk about their divorce. Then the moms and dads come together to talk to Dr Drew.
3	"Unseen Moments"	February 4, 2013
3	"Check Up with Dr. Drew"	February 11, 2013
4	"Unseen Moments"	April 29, 2013
4	"Check Up with Dr. Drew Part I"	May 6, 2013
4	"Check Up with Dr. Drew Part II"	May 13, 2013
5a	"Catch Up Special"	January 7, 2014
5a	"Check Up with Dr. Drew Part I"	April 15, 2014
5a	"Unseen Moments"	April 16, 2014
5a	"Check Up with Dr. Drew Part II"	April 22, 2014
5b	"Catch Up Special"	July 13, 2014
5b	"Toddler Moments"	July 13, 2014
5b	"Ask the Moms"	October 6, 2014
5b	"Check Up with Dr. Drew Part I"	October 8, 2014
5b	"Check Up with Dr. Drew Part II"	October 15, 2014
5b	"Unseen Moments"	October 22, 2014
6	"Catch Up Special"	June 22, 2015
6	"Check Up with Dr. Drew Part I"	September 30, 2015
6	"Check Up with Dr. Drew Part II"	October 7, 2015
6	"Unseen Moments"	October 14, 2015
7a	"Catch Up Special"	March 14, 2016
7a	"Teen Mom 2 vs. Teen Mom OG"	April 4, 2016
7a	"All About the Dads"	April 19, 2016
7a	"Check Up with Dr. Drew Part I"	June 13, 2016
7a	"Check Up with Dr. Drew Part II"	June 20, 2016
7a	"Unseen Moments"	June 27, 2016
7a	"Being Barb"	July 11, 2016
7b	"Backstage Pass"	November 27, 2016
7b	"Weekend at Corey's"	December 12, 2016
7b	"Reunion Madness"	March 13, 2017
7b	"Behind the Scenes"	March 20, 2017
7b	"Check Up with Dr. Drew Part I"	March 20, 2017
7b	"Check Up with Dr. Drew Part II"	March 27, 2017
7b	"Unseen Moments"	March 27, 2017
7b	"Ask the Moms"	April 3, 2017
7b	"All the Reasons to Love Teen Mom 2"	April 3, 2017
8a	"The New Mom"	July 3, 2017
8a	"Being Nathan"	September 27, 2017
8a	"Being Vee"	October 4, 2017
8a	"The Most Memorable Meltdowns"	October 18, 2017
8a	"Reunion Madness, Pt. 2"	October 23, 2017
8a	"Jenelle vs. Barb"	October 25, 2017
8a	"Law and Disorder"	November 1, 2017
8a	"Check Up with Dr. Drew Part I"	November 13, 2017
8a	"Check Up with Dr. Drew Part II"	November 20, 2017
8a	"Unseen Moments"	November 20, 2017
8a	"Jenelle: The Ex-Files"	December 11, 2017
8a	"Chelsea & Cole: A Love Story"	December 20, 2017
8a	"Biggest Behind the Scene Moments"	February 5, 2018
8a	"Being Javi"	February 13, 2018
8a	"Being Brittany"	March 5, 2018
8b	"Behind the Screams"	August 6, 2018
8b	"Check Up with Dr. Drew Part I"	August 13, 2018
8b	"Check Up with Dr. Drew Part II"	August 27, 2018
8b	"Unseen Moments"	September 3, 2018
8b	"Kailyn’s Biggest Blow-Ups"	September 5, 2018
8b	"Secrets Revealed"	September 12, 2018
8b	"Ask the Moms"	December 31, 2018
9a	"Check Up with Dr. Drew Part I"	May 20, 2019
9a	"Check Up with Dr. Drew Part II"	May 27, 2019
9a	"Check Up with Dr. Drew Part III"	June 3, 2019
9a	"Unseen Moments"	June 3, 2019
9b	"Check Up with Dr. Drew Part I"	December 3, 2019
9b	"Check Up with Dr. Drew Part II"	December 10, 2019
9b	"Check Up with Dr. Drew Part III"	December 17, 2019
9b	"Unseen Moments"	December 17, 2019
10a	"Check Up with Dr. Drew Part I"	January 5, 2021
Chelsea announces her departure from the series.
10a	"Check Up with Dr. Drew Part II"	January 12, 2021
10a	"Briana's Family Secret"	January 19, 2021
10b	"Check Up with Dr. Drew Part I"	July 27, 2021
10b	"Check Up with Dr. Drew Part II"	August 3, 2021
11	"Reunion Part I"	May 17, 2022
Leah speaks out about the social media drama that’s gone down recently and Kail reveals she’s in a new relationship. Jade discusses rekindling her love for Sean post-rehab.
11	"Reunion Part II"	May 24, 2022
Kail shares a devastating secret while Briana defends her choices. Kail’s ex Chris shares his side of the story and a surprise guests shocks everyone.
