= List of 16 and Pregnant episodes =

16 and Pregnant is an American reality television series that debuted on June 11, 2009, on MTV. It follows the stories of pregnant teenage girls in high school dealing with the hardships of teenage pregnancy. Each episode features a different teenage girl, with the episode typically beginning when she is 4 1/2 – 8 months into her pregnancy. The episode typically ends when the baby is a few months old. The series is produced in a documentary format, with an animation on notebook paper showing highlights during each episode preceding the commercial breaks. 16 and Pregnant has spawned three spin-off series: Teen Mom, Teen Mom 2 and Teen Mom 3. Each series follows the lives of four girls from their respective season of 16 and Pregnant as they navigate their first years of motherhood. Another spinoff, Teen Mom: Young and Pregnant, premiered in March, 2018.

== Series overview ==
Season	Episodes	Originally released	
Season	Episodes	First released	Last released
1	6	June 11, 2009	July 16, 2009
2	19	February 16, 2010	December 21, 2010
3	10	April 19, 2011	June 21, 2011
4	12	March 27, 2012	May 29, 2012
5	12	April 14, 2014	July 28, 2014
6	11	October 6, 2020	April 13, 2021

== Episodes ==
=== Season 1 (2009) ===
No. overall	No. in season	Title	Original release date	US viewers (millions)
1	1	"Maci"	June 11, 2009	N/A
Episode Summary: Maci DeShane McKinney (née Bookout) is a 16-year-old girl from Chattanooga, Tennessee, pregnant by her then-boyfriend and later ex-fiancé, Ryan Edwards. Prior to the birth, the episode focuses on Ryan's indifference to the forthcoming baby and his relationship with Maci. Maci gave birth to their son, Bentley Cadence Edwards, on October 27, 2008. Following the birth, the episode focuses on Maci and Ryan's relationship struggles due to Maci having to carry most of the parenting load. Post-Episode Updates: Maci was one of the season's four mothers to appear on Teen Mom (later renamed Teen Mom OG). Bookout married Taylor McKinney on October 8, 2016, in Greenville, Florida. Maci and Taylor are parents to a daughter, Jayde Carter, born on May 29, 2015 and a son, Maverick Reed, born on May 31, 2016. In 2017 Ryan married Mackenzie Standifer and became a step-father to her son, Hudson. Ryan attended a rehab facility in 2017 for addiction to heroin. On October 9, 2018, Mackenzie gave birth to their first son together, named Jagger Ryan. On January 1, 2020, Mackenzie gave birth to the couple's second child Stella Rhea. In 2023, it was revealed that Mackenzie filed for divorce from Ryan On February 12, 2025, Ryan welcomed his first child, Presley Sage Elianna Edwards, with fiancé Amanda Conner.
2	2	"Farrah"	June 18, 2009	N/A
Episode Summary: Farrah Abraham is a 17-year-old pregnant girl from Council Bluffs, Iowa, who decides not to tell her ex-boyfriend, Derek Underwood, about the pregnancy after he sends her threatening text messages. On February 23, 2009, Farrah gave birth to her daughter, Sophia Laurent Abraham. After the birth, the episode focuses on Abraham's struggles due to being housebound without a car and her difficult relationship with her mother. Post-Episode Updates: Underwood died in a car accident on December 28, 2008, which was not mentioned in Abraham's 16 & Pregnant episode. She was one of four mothers selected from the first season to star in MTV's Teen Mom, which launched in December 2009. Underwood's death was heavily featured in Abraham's Teen Mom segments. Abraham has also appeared on Channel 5's Celebrity Big Brother. In 2013, Abraham starred in the porn video Farrah Superstar: Backdoor Teen Mom, and followed up in 2014 with Farrah 2: Backdoor And More. In October 2017, Abraham was fired from Teen Mom, with producers citing her continued activity in the adult entertainment industry. She was in an off-and-on relationship with real estate broker Simon Saran who appeared in an MTV special entitled 'Being Simon' Abraham was arrested on May 13, 2018 in California following an altercation with hotel security staff at the Beverly Hills Hotel.
3	3	"Amber"	June 25, 2009	N/A
Episode Summary: Amber Leann Portwood is an 18-year-old girl from Anderson, Indiana, who is pregnant by her boyfriend of two and a half years, Gary Shirley. Prior to the birth, the episode focuses on Amber's struggles with Gary's immaturity, the tension between both of their families, and her longing for her brother to return from duty in Iraq. Amber gave birth to their daughter, Leah Leann Shirley, on November 12, 2008. Following the birth, the episode focuses on Amber's struggles with the realities of parenthood. Post-Episode Updates: Amber was later selected to star in MTV's Teen Mom. Though she and Gary became engaged over the course of the television series' filming, they would ultimately separate. MTV aired footage of Amber striking Gary in the head and face in 2010 and she was arrested for domestic violence. Amber was later sentenced to five years in jail for drug possession after failing to attend court-ordered rehab; she was released after serving 17 months at Rockville Correctional Facility. Gary was granted full custody of their daughter in December 2011. Since being released from prison, Amber has been granted visitation. In 2014, Amber met Matt Baier, an unemployed former radio DJ, via Twitter. The pair became engaged the following year, however, after multiple postponements of their wedding, Amber and Matt split in June 2017. In 2017 she began dating Andrew Glennon, whom she met while filming Marriage Boot Camp. The pair announced in November 2017 that they were expecting their first child. On May 8, 2018, Amber gave birth to their son, James Andrew Glennon. In 2019, Amber got in a physical altercation with Andrew, in which she allegedly drew a Machete. Andrew was awarded primary custody of James with Amber receiving unsupervised visitation three times a week. Gary married Kristina Anderson and they welcomed a daughter, Emilee Grace Shirley, on April 30, 2015. Gary is additionally a step-father to her daughter, Karly, from a previous marriage to a man named Greg. Karly is not permitted to be on the show due to her father filing papers to keep her off camera.
4	4	"Ebony"	July 2, 2009	N/A
Episode Summary: Ebony Jackson is a 17-year-old girl from Colorado Springs, Colorado, who is pregnant by her fiancé, Josh Rendon. The episode focuses on how the pregnancy changes their plans to both join the air force. Ebony gave birth to a daughter, Jocelyn Jade Rendon, on April 29, 2009. The episode then focuses on Ebony's and Josh's struggles to move forward. Post-Episode Updates: Ebony did not appear in the network's follow-up show Teen Mom, one of only two mothers from the first season not selected for the show. The couple were married and, in 2011, were arrested for endangering the welfare of a minor and Jocelyn was taken into protective care by Children and Family Services. They regained custody of their first child shortly before welcoming a second daughter, Jayda Jewel Rendon, on October 15, 2012. They divorced in 2013. Josh currently has primary custody of their two daughters, Jocelyn and Jayda. As of 2017, Ebony was engaged to James Baldrick; the couple's first child, Jaelyn Zoria Baldrick, was born on June 8, 2015.
5	5	"Whitney"	July 9, 2009	N/A
Episode Summary: Whitney Purvis is a 16-year-old girl from Rome, Georgia, who is pregnant by her boyfriend, Weston Lewis Gosa. The couple live with Purvis' grandmother, MeeMaw. The episode focuses on the multitude of problems faced by Purvis during her pregnancy, including social isolation, dropping out of high school, and financial difficulties. The episode, notably, revealed that Purvis' mother, April, was also pregnant. The pair's son, Weston Owen Gosa Jr., was born on April 2, 2009. After the birth, the episode focuses on Purvis struggling to live up to adult responsibilities and on Purvis and Gosa moving into a place of their own with their son. Post-Episode Updates: Purvis did not appear in the network's follow-up show Teen Mom, which launched in December 2009; Purvis was one of only two mothers from the first season not selected. Purvis and Gosa split in May 2011, with Purvis and then 2-year-old Weston Jr. moving back in with Purvis' mother, April, just five months after April had been arrested for felony possession of methamphetamine. The couple reunited by 2012, and over the next two years they were arrested for a string of offences, including: stealing a pregnancy test (Purvis, March 2012); criminal trespassing (Purvis and Gosa, December 2012); and driving on a suspended license (Gosa, December 2013). Purvis gave birth to the couple's second son, River Blake, on October 14, 2014, shortly before the pair separated again. In June 2016, just days after her drug addict boyfriend, Keith Mason, had suffered an overdose, Purvis and Mason announced their engagement; that same month, Gosa married a woman named Christine. Weston Gosa Jr. passed away on June 2, 2025 at the age of 16; when he died, the boy was living with his father, who by then was remarried to a woman named Amy. On July 7, 2025, the 33-year-old Purvis was charged in Floyd County, Georgia with felony involuntary manslaughter in the February 2025 drug overdose death of John Mark Harris, to whom Purvis had supplied a Fentanyl-based drug mixture.
6	6	"Catelynn"	July 16, 2009	N/A
Episode Summary: Catelynn Baltierra (née Lowell) is a 16-year-old girl from Algonac, Michigan, who is pregnant by her boyfriend of three years, and then step-brother, Tyler Baltierra. Neither of them feel that their living conditions are suitable for a new child and decided to look into adoption, going against their parents' wishes. The episode focuses on their selection of an adoptive couple. On May 18, 2009, Catelynn gives birth to a baby girl, who is named Carolyn ("Carly") Elizabeth Davis by her adoptive parents, Brandon and Teresa. Following the birth, the episode focuses on Catelynn's mother's refusal to go along with the adoption and Catelynn's means for overcoming that. Post-Episode Updates: Catelynn and Tyler later appeared on the network's Teen Mom. Catelynn gave birth to daughter Novalee "Nova" Reign on January 1, 2015. On August 22, 2015, Tyler and Catelynn married: notable guests included their Teen Mom OG co-stars Maci McKinney and husband Taylor McKinney, Amber Portwood and then fiancé Matt Baier, and Teen Mom 2 star Kailyn Lowry and then-husband Javi Marroquin. Following a miscarriage in 2017, Catelynn attended a treatment center in Arizona for depression and self-harm. Their daughter Vaeda Luma was born on February 21, 2019. Another daughter, Rya Rose, was born on August 28, 2021.
Special–1	Special–1	"Life After Labor"	July 23, 2009	N/A
All the families from the first season of 16 and Pregnant meet to discuss what has changed and happened in their lives since the cameras stopped rolling. The reunion is hosted by Dr. Drew Pinsky.
Special–2	Special–2	"Never Before Seen"	July 30, 2009	N/A
This episode shows all the unseen clips of episodes that were not aired during the first season, and is hosted by Dr. Drew.

=== Season 2 (2010–11) ===
No. overall	No. in season	Title	Original release date	US viewers (millions)
7	1	"Jenelle"	February 16, 2010	N/A
Episode Summary: Jenelle Eason (née Evans; previously Rogers) is a 17-year-old girl who lives in Oak Island, North Carolina, and is known as a "party girl". She is pregnant by her boyfriend, Andrew Lewis, whom she later breaks up with due to his arrests. Jenelle gave birth to their son, Jace Vahn Evans, on August 2, 2009. After Jace's birth, the episode's focus is on Jenelle's continuing to party and her reliance on her mother, Barbara Evans. Post-Episode Summary: Jenelle was one of four mothers to appear in MTV's Teen Mom 2 series. Andrew went on to father another son, Jacob Michael "Jake" Lewis on September 6, 2010, with his wife, Cindy Becker. Andrew is not involved in his eldest son's life as of 2017. In 2019, Andrew unexpectedly asked for visitation with Jace. In 2010, Jenelle signed over temporary custody of her son to her mother, Barbara. In 2017, Barbara was granted permanent custody of Jace, with Jenelle receiving visitation with her eldest son. After noted relationships with Keiffer Delp and a failed engagement to Gary Head, Jenelle married Courtland Rogers in 2012. The marriage was short-lived and the pair divorced in late 2013. Jenelle sought an abortion following her separation from Courtland, citing her heroin usage and on-going custody battle as factors in her decision to terminate her pregnancy. In early 2013, Jenelle began dating Nathan Griffith and gave birth to their son, Kaiser Orion "Kai" Griffith, on June 30, 2014. The couple were briefly engaged before separating permanently in 2015. Nathan and Jenelle have shared custody of Kaiser. Nathan has a daughter, Emery (Emmy or Em) Lauren, from a previous relationship with a woman named Allison, where she has full custody and he has visitation once a month. She started dating David Eason in 2016 and the couple became engaged in February 2017. She and David welcomed their daughter, Ensley Jolie Eason, on January 24, 2017. David has sole custody of his daughter, Maryssa Rose, from a previous marriage to Whitney Johnson, due to her drug and alcohol problems. He also has a son, Kaden David from another previous relationship with Olivia Leedham. Olivia filed a no contact order (one for herself and one for Kaden) against David, following allegations of domestic violence. On September 23, 2017, Jenelle and David married. The pair temporarily lost custody of their four children in their care for a period of five months in 2019. Jenelle was fired from Teen Mom 2 in May 2019 and has been replaced on the show with Teen Mom: Young and Pregnant star Jade Cline.
8	2	"Nikkole"	February 23, 2010	N/A
Episode Summary: Nikkole Ledda (née Paulun) is a 15-year-old girl from Monroe, Michigan, and is pregnant by her boyfriend, Josh Drummonds. The episode focuses on Josh's history of cheating on Nikkole. On November 5, 2009, Nikkole gave birth to their son, Lyle Thomas Drummonds. After his birth, Josh stops helping with Lyle, and he and Nikkole break up. Post-Episode Updates: Josh was imprisoned for larceny and forgery in 2011 and was later incarcerated on multiple counts, including trespassing, assault and battery, domestic violence, and escaping and eluding the police. Nikkole gave birth to a daughter, Ellie Jade Paulun, on July 5, 2015 with ex-boyfriend, Ryan Rice. When Josh was released in 2016, he and Nikkole briefly reconciled; the pair split again in 2017. Nikkole reportedly took out an order of protection against Josh. Josh was re-arrested in Texas following an incidence of domestic violence. Sometime in 2020, Nikkole had a miscarriage with her now-husband Kyle Ledda. The couple married on July 18, 2020, and had a son named Bodhi John Ledda on July 7th, 2021.
9	3	"Valerie"	March 2, 2010	N/A
Episode Summary: Valerie Fairman is a 15-year-old girl from Oxford, Pennsylvania, raised by her adoptive parents. As the episode unfolds, her boyfriend Matt Pryce breaks up with her and says he does not want any contact with her, unless it's about the baby. On September 14, 2009, Valerie gives birth to a girl, Nevaeh Lynn Fairman. After Nevaeh's birth, it is discovered that she may have meconium aspiration syndrome, but after a short hospital stay, the baby is healthy enough for her mother to take her home. After her birth, the episode focuses on Matt showing interest in Nevaeh and his relationship with Valerie. Post-Episode Updates: Valerie's parents obtained custody of Nevaeh while the child's father, Matt, has occasional visitation. In February 2015, Valerie was arrested in Delaware for prostitution. On December 21, 2016, Valerie died of a suspected overdose.
10	4	"Chelsea"	March 9, 2010	N/A
Episode Summary: Chelsea DeBoer (née Houska) is a 17-year-old girl from Vermillion, South Dakota, who is pregnant by her boyfriend, Adam Lind. Prior to the birth, the episode focuses on the couple's tumultuous relationship and Adam's controlling behavior. After a difficult pregnancy, Chelsea gives birth to a daughter, Aubree Skye Lind, five weeks early on September 7, 2009. After her birth, the episode then focuses on Adam immediately becoming uninterested in Chelsea and him becoming increasingly distant from Aubree. Post-Episode Updates: Chelsea was one of four mothers from Season Two to be selected for MTV's Teen Mom 2. During early seasons, the show depicted Chelsea and Adam's continuing on-again-off-again relationship, that finally ended for good in 2012. Adam welcomed his second daughter, Paislee Mae Lind, on September 3, 2013, with then-girlfriend, Taylor Halbur. Adam was involved in a serious car accident in 2014 in which he hit a Lincoln town car, hospitalizing both the 87-year-old driver and her 94-year-old passenger. Warrants were issued for Adam's arrest following his failure to pay child support to both Chelsea and Taylor in 2016. In 2017, Adam tested positive for Meth and amphetamines, losing visitation with Paislee. In 2014, Chelsea met and started dating Cole DeBoer and in 2015 the two became engaged. On October 1, 2016, Chelsea and Cole married. Chelsea gave birth to their son, Watson Cole DeBoer, on January 25, 2017. On August 29th, 2018 Chelsea welcomed her third child, a girl named Layne Ettie. On November 10, 2020, Chelsea announced over social media that she will no longer be appearing on Teen Mom. Daughter Walker June was born January 25, 2021. Since 2023, Chelsea and Cole have starred in their own show, Down Home Fab, on HGTV.
11	5	"Lori"	March 16, 2010	N/A
Episode Summary: Lori Wickelhaus is a 17-year-old girl from Fort Thomas, Kentucky, who is pregnant by her ex-boyfriend, Cory Haskett. Raised by adoptive parents, Lori struggles to decide whether to keep the baby or not during her episode. The show initially focuses on the conflicting desires between her family and friends over whether she should keep the baby or place it through adoption. Once Lori decides on an open adoption, the episode focuses on the difficulty in finding an adoptive family. Lori gave birth to a baby boy, Aidan Elliot Benson, on December 16, 2009. She continues to see Aidan and his adoptive family on a regular basis. Post-Episode Update: On October 22, 2013, Lori gave birth to a baby girl, Rylynn Jo, with her then-fiancé, Joey Amos. Lori later gave birth to her third child, a boy named Logan, on October 3, 2014, from Joey. In August 2020, Lori was arrested for possession of child pornography.
12	6	"Samantha"	March 23, 2010	N/A
Episode Summary: Samantha Hernandez is a 16-year-old girl from Rosenberg, Texas, who is pregnant by her boyfriend, Eric Salinas. Samantha's daughter, Jordynn Amelia Marie Salinas, was born on December 22, 2009, via emergency C-section. After Jordynn's birth, the episode focuses on Samantha bearing the responsibility of caring for Jordynn while Eric returns to school
13	7	"Nicole"	March 30, 2010	N/A
Episode Summary: Nicole Navarro (née Fokos) is a 16-year-old from Longwood, Florida, who is pregnant by her boyfriend, Tyler Keller. Throughout her pregnancy, Nicole's mother is very supportive because she (Nicole's mother) lost a child shortly after birth and Nicole's father died two years later. On January 17, 2010, Nicole gave birth to Brooklyn Marie Keller. Following the birth, the episode focuses on Nicole and Tyler living between houses and trying to get their lives back on track. Post-Episode Update: Nicole and Tyler have since broken up; the pair co-parent their daughter. Nicole had her second child, a baby girl named Scarlett Elizabeth, with her boyfriend, Kenny Navarro, on March 31, 2016. Nicole and Kenny married on February 17, 2018. Tyler welcomed his second daughter, Juliet, in 2017.
14	8	"Leah"	April 6, 2010	N/A
Episode Summary: Leah Dawn Messer (previously Simms and Calvert) is a 17-year-old from Elkview, West Virginia, who gets pregnant with twin girls by her new boyfriend Corey Simms. The pair had dated for only one month prior to discovering that Leah was pregnant. Aliannah Hope and Aleeah Grace Simms (sometimes referred to as Grace or Gracie) are born prematurely on December 16, 2009 via c-section. Following the birth, the episode focuses on the relationship strains between Leah and Corey, who struggle with building their still-new relationship while caring for the twins. Post-Episode Update: The couple separated following Leah's infidelity with long-time ex-boyfriend Robbie Kidd. They eventually reconcile and, on October 17, 2010, the couple marry. The couple split again in 2011 after alleged infidelity. The pair divorced in 2011. As of 2016, Leah and Corey share custody of the twins. Leah was selected as one of four moms from Season 2 to appear in MTV's Teen Mom 2. Corey and Leah, during the course of the series, learn that their daughter Aliannah suffers from Titin muscular dystrophy, a very rare form of the disorder that has only ever been found in adults. In April 2012, Leah married Jeremy Calvert. After a miscarriage, which Leah later admitted she had actually had an abortion, the couple welcomed their daughter, Adalynn Faith, on February 4, 2013. Leah and Jeremy have since divorced. Jeremy was dating Brooke Wehr, who has one daughter, Makenna, from a previous relationship. They have since broken up. Leah was dating Jason Jordan, a medical salesman who she met after being introduced by his cousin. He was 39 years old, a father of a two-year-old son (he was married to his son's mother from 2014 to 2017), and lived near Leah's home in West Virginia. They have since broken up. On June 7, 2013, Corey married Miranda Patterson. The couple welcomed daughter, Remington Monroe Simms, on November 8, 2015, two months premature.
15	9	"Lizzie"	April 13, 2010	N/A
Episode Summary: Lizzie Mortensen (née Waller; previously Sickles) is a teenager from Smithfield, Virginia, who is pregnant by her boyfriend, Skylar Sickles. Prior to the birth, the episode focuses on the relationship troubles between Lizzie and Skylar. On January 30, 2010, Lizzie gave birth to their child, Summer Jayde Sickles. After her birth, the episode focuses on the adjustments Lizzie must make to her life and goals due to being a teen mother. Post-Episode Update: Skylar and Lizzie married shortly after Summer's birth, but have since divorced. Skylar welcomed a daughter, Reese, with his girlfriend, Krista Pembroke. Lizzie is currently married to Dave Mortensen who, himself, has three children. Together, the couple welcomed their first child, a boy on June 6th 2018.
16	10	"Kailyn"	April 20, 2010	N/A
Episode Summary: Kailyn Lowry is a 16-year-old from Nazareth, Pennsylvania, who is pregnant by her boyfriend, Jonathan "Jo" Rivera. The episode focuses on the lack of support Kailyn receives from her own estranged family, which forces her to rely on Jo's family. On January 18, 2010, Kailyn gave birth to their son, Isaac Elliott Rivera. The pair separated shortly after Isaac's birth. Post-Episode Update: Kailyn was selected as one of the season's four moms to appear on Teen Mom 2. Kailyn married Sr. Air Man José "Javi" Marroquin in late 2013. Shortly after her wedding, she and Javi welcomed a son, Lincoln Marshall, on November 16, 2013. Their divorce was finalized in 2016. In February 2017, Kailyn announced on her blog that she was pregnant with her third child, with Chris Lopez. In May 2017, Kailyn graduated from Delaware State University while five months pregnant. Kailyn's third son, Lux Russell Lowry, was born August 5, 2017. Chris Lopez, a longtime friend, is the child's father. On July 30, 2020, Kailyn gave birth to her fourth son, Creed Romello Lopez, he weighed 8lbs, 15oz. This is her second child with Chris Lopez. Jo welcomed his second child, a daughter named Velisse Eva Rivera. with his fiancé, Vetzabe "Vee" Torres on October 4, 2015. Jo and Vee subsequently married on September 23, 2018. Javi welcomed his second child, a son named Eli Joseph Marroquin, with his girlfriend Lauren Comeau on November 15, 2018.
Special–3	Special–1	"Mid-Season Reunion: Life After Labor"	April 20, 2010	
All the families from the first half of Season 2 meet to discuss what has changed and happened in their lives since the cameras stopped rolling. The event is hosted by Dr. Drew Pinsky.
17	11	"Brooke"	October 26, 2010	N/A
Episode Summary: Brooke Ashley Wallace (previously Smitherman-Tarrant) is a 16-year-old girl from Mansfield, Texas, who is pregnant by her boyfriend of two years, Cody Ryan Tarrant. The couple got married before their son's birth. The episode focuses on Cody's struggles to graduate high school early, so he can take care of the baby after he's born, thus allowing Brooke to finish high school. Brooke gave birth to their son, Brody Ryan Tarrant, on January 28, 2010. The remainder of the episode focuses on the difficulties of parenting and how the relationship between Brooke and Cody continues to remain strong despite the struggles of teen parenthood. Post-Episode Update: On December 18, 2012, they welcomed their second child, a daughter named Ryley Jean Tarrant. The couple divorced in 2015. As of 2017, she is dating Phil Wallace, who has a daughter from a previous relationship. Cody had a daughter, Harper, in 2019 with his fiance, Tiffany. They married in May 2020.
18	12	"Felicia"	November 2, 2010	N/A
Episode Summary: Felicia Garza (née Cooke) is a 17-year-old girl from Lewisville, Texas, who is pregnant by her boyfriend, Alex Gutierrez. The focus of the episode, prior to the birth, is on the tension between Felicia's mother and Alex, as well as Alex's waning interest in Felicia in favor of his friends. On February 25, 2010, Felicia gave birth to their daughter, Genesis Alexa Gutierrez. Following the birth, the episode focuses on Felicia's and Alex's continuing relationship problems and Felicia's ongoing desire to be the first person in her family to graduate high school. Post-Episode Update: Felicia gave birth to the couple's second daughter, Giselle Isabella Gutierrez, on May 14, 2014. The couple were not together during the birth of their second daughter. As 2017, she is dating a man named Jose. On September 19, 2019, they welcomed their first child together, a son, Greyson Levi Garza.
19	13	"Emily"	November 9, 2010	N/A
Episode Summary: Emily McKenzie (previously Peterson) is a 16-year-old girl from Hayden, Alabama, and is pregnant by her boyfriend, Daniel Peterson. Emily moved in with her dad and step-mom, having been kicked out of her mother's home due to her pregnancy. Prior to the birth, the episode focuses on their marriage plans and Emily being kicked out of high school for missing too many days due to her pregnancy. Emily gave birth to their son, Liam Allen Peterson, on February 17, 2010. The remainder of the episode focuses on Emily trying to stay on track to graduate from homeschooling and disagreements over whether to postpone the wedding or not. On March 31, 2022, McKenzie welcomed her second son, Maddox. Post-Episode Update: While the couple did eventually get married after Liam's birth, they announced their divorce in 2012 and it was finalized in 2013.
20	14	"Markai"	November 16, 2010	N/A
Episode Summary: Markai Durham is a 16-year-old girl from Riverview, Florida, She is pregnant by her boyfriend, James Worsham. On October 12, 2009, Durham gave birth to Za'Karia Sanari Worsham. Following the birth, the episode focuses on the drama between Markai and James after Markai found out James had been cheating on her. Post-Episode Update: The couple were profiled in an MTV special "No Easy Decision", which followed the couple's decision to have an abortion in 2010. Markai and James have since ended their relationship. Markai now works as a Dental Assistant. On September 5, 2015, Markai married Christopher Anderson. The couple have since separated and as of 2017, Markai is single. She was expecting her second baby in 2018. Markai gave birth to her second daughter Zi'Amarra Grace Elise in 2018. Markai gave birth to her third daughter, Zuree, in July 2020. In July 2020, James married his girlfriend, Orleana, who was pregnant with their first child. James welcomed a son, Jaxon, with his wife.
21	15	"Aubrey"	November 23, 2010	N/A
Episode Summary: 17-year-old Aubrey Wolters (previously Akerill) is from Prescott Valley, Arizona, and is pregnant by her boyfriend, Brandon Akerill. Prior to the birth, Brandon and Aubrey got married. The episode focuses on the contention between Brandon and Aubrey because he wants her to be a housewife and stay home to raise the baby while he works, which is not the path that Aubrey wants for herself. On February 6, 2010, Aubrey gave birth to their son, Austin Carter Akerill. Following the birth, the episode focuses on Aubrey's and Brandon's job choices and them trying to move out and into their own home. Post-Episode Update: The couple would go on to divorce. On February 18, 2014, she had a baby boy named Ryland with her boyfriend Zach. They welcomed her third baby, another boy, in June 2017.
22	16	"Christinna"	November 30, 2010	N/A
Episode Summary: 17-year-old Christinna Cook is from Huntsville, Alabama, who is pregnant by her boyfriend, Isaiah Robinson, the star of the high school football team. Isaiah turns down his college football scholarship and gets a job locally to support the forthcoming child. The episode's focus, before and after the birth, is on Isaiah's family blaming Christinna for Isaiah's decision to stay in Huntsville for their baby, losing his scholarship as a result. Christinna gave birth to their daughter, Destiny Brianna Robinson, on December 22, 2009, via C-section. Following the birth, the episode shows the hardships teen parenthood puts on a relationship. Post-Episode Update: The couple would go on to break up. In 2013, Isaiah welcomed a son named Isidro, who is from a different relationship and Christinna welcomed her second daughter, Naomi, in March 2014, with her husband, Dalonte Wallace.
23	17	"Kayla"	December 6, 2010	N/A
Episode Summary: Kayla Jones (née Jordan) is a 17-year-old girl from Centre, Alabama, who is pregnant by her boyfriend, J.R. Davis. Prior to the birth, the episode follows their evolving relationship, including a surprise marriage proposal, which has the support of both their parents. Rylan Jayce Davis is born on January 19, 2010. Despite being premature, Rylan is pronounced healthy. Following his birth, the episode follows the changes in Kayla's relationships with her friends and her reluctance to move out of her parents' house, due to her dependence on them. Post-Episode Update: Kayla and J.R. would eventually end their engagement. Kayla had her second son, Bryce Harper Bedwell, on July 20, 2015, with her then-fiancé, Zach Bedwell. Jordan and Bedwell later separated, calling off their engagement..
24	18	"Megan"	December 14, 2010	N/A
Episode Summary:Megan McConnell (previously Stone) is a 16-year-old girl from Ault, Colorado, who is pregnant by her 19-year-old boyfriend, Nathan Stone. Prior to the birth, the episode follows Megan's displeasure at Nathan's lack of involvement and lack of employment, as well as his obsession with video games. On January 19, 2010, Megan gave birth to their son, Blake Ray Stone. After his birth, the episode follows Megan's estrangement from her friends and Nathan's continued lack of involvement with Megan and Blake. Post-Episode Update:While Megan and Nathan did marry in 2011, they divorced later that year. Megan welcomed her second son, Silas Jude, on April 13, 2015, with her boyfriend, Chase Eubanks. The two also welcomed a daughter, Felicity Elise, on July 25, 2019.
Special–4	Special–2	"Unseen Moments — Season 2"	December 14, 2010	N/A
Unseen moments from the episodes Brooke, Felicia, Emily, Markai, Aubrey, Christinna, Kayla, and Megan, as well as some scenes that will be unseen from Ashley's episode, which aired the week after this episode.
25	19	"Ashley"	December 21, 2010	N/A
Episode Summary:In this 90 minute episode, Ashley Salazar is a 17-year-old high school senior from McKinney, Texas. She is pregnant by her ex-boyfriend, Justin Lane, who she is no longer in contact with. Prior to the birth, the episode follows Ashley trying to reconcile her dreams of going to college in New York City to become a photojournalist with the realities of being a single teen mom. Her aunt and uncle offer to adopt the baby, but Ashley is reluctant to place her child for adoption. On December 16, 2009, Ashley gives birth to her daughter, Callie Danielle Salazar. After her birth, the episode follows Ashley's indecision over whether to go through with the adoption. After a month of caring for her daughter alone, Ashley decides to go through with the adoption and gives Callie to her aunt and uncle, who live a few hours away. Post-Episode Update: Ashley and Justin welcomed their second child, son Phoenix Roy Lane, on January 7, 2017.
Special–5	Special–3	"Life After Labor"	December 28, 2010	N/A
All the families from the second half of Season 2 meet to discuss what has changed and happened in their lives since the cameras stopped rolling. The event is hosted by Dr. Drew Pinsky.
Special–6	Special–4	"Where Are They Now?"	January 4, 2011	N/A
The episode provides updates on eight of the mothers who had appeared in earlier episodes.

=== Season 3 (2011) ===
No. overall	No. in season	Title	Original release date	US viewers (millions)
26	1	"Jordan"	April 19, 2011	2.39
Episode Summary: Jordan Ward (previously Ward-Finder) is a 17-year-old from St. Louis, Missouri, who is pregnant by her boyfriend, Brian Finder. The episode focuses on the changes that the forthcoming baby makes to the relationship between Jordan and her identical twin sister, Jessica, who are very close. Noah James Finder was born on July 14, 2010. Post-Episode Update: Brian and Jordan went on to marry and welcomed their second child, a daughter named Arri Monroe Finder, on November 5, 2011. The couple separated in 2016. In April 2017, Jordan announced via instagram that she and her partner, Manny Hinkson, were pregnant with their first child. On September 18, 2017 Jordan gave birth to the couple's first son, Leo Gray.
27	2	"Jennifer"	April 26, 2011	2.35
Episode Summary: Jennifer Cherie Del Rio-Gutiérrez (née Del Rio) is a 16-year-old from Riverview, Florida, who is pregnant by her then-fiancé, Josh Smith. The episode focuses on the tension between Josh and Jennifer's family. Jennifer gave birth to twin boys, Joshua Devan Smith Jr. and Noah Matthew Smith, on October 11, 2010 via c-section. Following their birth, the episode focuses on the couple's increasingly strained relationship, ultimately culminating in an on-air physical fight and Josh's arrest. Post-Episode Update: The couple sparred over custody of their sons and Josh and Jennifer both filed restraining orders against one another. Jennifer is presently married to Luis Gutiérrez and gave birth to their son, Sebastian, on April 25, 2014. Jennifer later gave birth to their baby girl, Annabella Cherie on February 2, 2018.
28	3	"Jamie"	May 3, 2011	2.29
Episode Summary: Jamie Lomax (née McKay) is a 17-year-old senior, honor student and student council member from Asheville, North Carolina, who is pregnant by her boyfriend, Ryan McElrath. The episode focuses on Jamie wanting her forthcoming daughter to have the traditional family she never had, and the confrontations between Ryan and Jamie's mother. Jamie gives birth to a daughter, Miah Christine McElrath, on October 3, 2010. Following the birth, the episode focuses on the relationship problems between Jamie and Ryan, and Ryan's infidelity. Post-Episode Update: In 2012, Jamie announced via Twitter that the couple had become unexpectedly pregnant and had terminated the pregnancy via abortion. The couple went on to welcome their second child, a son named Mason, on October 25, 2014. Jamie and Ryan separated in 2015. As of 2017, Jamie was in a relationship with a man named David Lomax. They had their first child together, a boy named Jackson Oliver, on June 15, 2018. Jamie and David married on July 28, 2018.
29	4	"Danielle"	May 10, 2011	1.45
Episode Summary: Danielle Cunningham is a high school teenager from Columbus, Ohio, who is pregnant by her boyfriend, Jamie Alderman. The episode focuses on Danielle's desire to be successful as a teen mother, and hers and Jamie's financial worries. Danielle gives birth to a son, Jamie Paul Alderman Jr. on October 8, 2010. Post-Episode Update: She and Jamie welcomed their second child, a daughter named Jayleigh Rae, on June 7, 2013. Danielle and Jamie have since broken up. On August 21, 2017, Danielle welcomed her third child, Kennley Layla, alongside boyfriend Tyler Sullivan.
30	5	"Cleondra"	May 17, 2011	1.73
Episode Summary: Cleondra Wrease (née Carter) is a 17-year-old senior from Horn Lake, Mississippi, who is pregnant by her boyfriend, Mario Escovedo. She already has the responsibility of taking care of her young niece Zyra almost full time. The episode focuses on disagreements on where the couple and baby should live, with the added twist that Cleondra and Mario currently live across the street from each other. Cleondra gives birth to a baby girl named Kylee Sue Escovedo on November 29, 2010. The couple also disagree on who should be allowed to watch the child, which leads to more fights. Post-Episode Update:Mario and Cleondra had separated by 2014, with Mario being awarded primary physical custody of their daughter Kylee. Cleondra gave birth to her second child, a son named Adrian Eli, on July 8, 2015, with then-boyfriend Michael Wrease. The couple went on to marry in 2016.
31	6	"Kayla"	May 24, 2011	1.96
Episode Summary: Kayla Jackson is 17 years old from Mankato, Minnesota, who is pregnant by her boyfriend, Mike Schwing. The episode focuses on Kayla's struggles with anorexia before, during and after the pregnancy. On November 4, 2010, Kayla gives birth to a son named Preston Michael Schwing via c-section. Post-Episode Update: Kayla and Mike have since broken up. As 2017, she is dating Matt Neyers and they welcomed a son, Cedric, on July 27, 2016.
32	7	"Izabella"	May 31, 2011	1.74
Episode Summary: Izabella Tovar (previously Rodriguez) is a 15-year-old from Draper, Utah, who is pregnant by her boyfriend, Jairo Rodriguez. The episode focuses on deceptions by both Izabella and Jairo. Izabella kept the pregnancy from her friends until the last minute which leads to estrangement from them, and Jairo lied to Izabella's family about having graduated high school. Izabella gives birth to a son, Enrique "Henry" Jairo Tovar, on September 17, 2010. Post-Episode Update: Izabella gave birth to the couple's second child, a girl, Anastazia Emily on November 5, 2014. In May of 2016, Izabella graduated from the University of Utah with a degree in Psychology. On May 29, 2016, Izabella and Jairo were married. As of 2018, Izabella and Jairo have separated. On September 20th, 2021, Izabella welcomed her third child, a daughter named Peach Eleanora, with her boyfriend, Josh Alofasaupō.
33	8	"Kianna"	June 7, 2011	1.82
Episode Summary:Kianna Harrington (née Randall) is a 17-year-old from Fort Worth, Texas, who is pregnant by her 15-year-old boyfriend, Zak Hegab. The episode focuses on their debating adoption, but then deciding to keep the baby because both of them live without their biological fathers in their life. On October 17, 2010, Kianna gives birth via c-section to son Kay'den Elijah Hegab. Post-Episode Update: Kianna and Zak separated following the airing of the episode. In 2013, Kianna married Eric Lee Harrington, who is in presently in jail serving 25 years for aggravated assault with a deadly weapon. Zak and Kianna were arrested in 2011 for armed burglary. Kianna was not charged; Zak was sentenced to juvenile detention. Zak was arrested again in 2015 for aggravated sexual assault of a child.
34	9	"Taylor"	June 14, 2011	1.56
Episode Summary:Taylor Lumas is a 15-year-old from Cincinnati, Ohio, who is pregnant by her boyfriend, Nathan Bridwell. The episode focuses on Taylor's mother encouraging adoption, but Taylor and Nathan deciding to keep the baby. Taylor gives birth to a daughter named Aubri Rose Bridwell on November 11, 2010. Following the birth, the episode focuses on Taylor's disappointment at Nathan as a father, and Taylor subsequently questioning their relationship and her decision to forgo adoption. Post-Episode Update:Taylor and Nathan separated shortly after Aubri's birth. During the season's aftershow, Taylor revealed that Aubri had undergone surgery to remove a tumour from her lungs. In 2019, Taylor welcomed her second daughter, Paisley, with fiance Eric.
Special–7	Special–1	"Unseen Moments — Season 3"	June 14, 2011	N/A
Dr. Drew hosts a look at the moments that were never shown with the girls from Season 3.
Special–8	Special–2	"Where Are They Now?"	June 19, 2011	N/A
A look at everything that's happened since the cameras stopped rolling on the girls from the previous season of 16 and Pregnant.
35	10	"Allie"	June 21, 2011	2.50
Episode Summary:Allison "Allie" Gerena (née Mendoza) living in Pasadena, Texas, is pregnant by her boyfriend Joey Aranzeta. Allie lives with Joey's mother, and the episode focuses on the mental instability of Joey's mother due to drug abuse, and the threats to Allie as a result. Allie gives birth to a son, Aydenn Anthony Aranzeta, on December 17, 2010. Following the birth, the episode focuses on Joey failing to live up to the responsibilities of being a parent, and Allie eventually ending things with him and moving out. Post-Episode Update:Joey is currently not involved in his son's life. As of 2015, she is married to Chris Gerena and they welcomed their son Christopher Eli Gerena Jr. on September 10, 2015.
Special–9	Special–3	"Life After Labor"	June 28, 2011	1.71
All the families from Season 3 of 16 and Pregnant meet to discuss what has changed and happened in their lives since the cameras stopped rolling. The event is hosted by Dr. Drew Pinsky.

=== Season 4 (2012) ===
No. overall	No. in season	Title	Original release date	US viewers (millions)
36	1	"Mackenzie"	March 27, 2012	2.07
Episode Summary: Mackenzie McKee (née Douthit) is 16 years old and a cheerleader from Miami, Oklahoma, who is pregnant by her boyfriend, Josh McKee. On September 12, 2011, Mackenzie gives birth to a baby boy, Gannon Dewayne McKee via c-section at 9 lb, 7 oz due to Mackenzie's diabetes. The episode focuses on the hard decisions Mackenzie and Josh must both make as parents, with Mackenzie having to give up cheerleading and Josh being pressured to give up bull riding. Post-Episode Update: Mackenzie was one of four of the Season 4 mothers selected for the network's short-lived Teen Mom 3. The pair married August 17, 2013. Mackenzie and Josh welcomed their second child, a girl, named Jaxie Taylor, on February 7, 2014 via emergency c-section at 8 lb, 9 oz. The couple's third child, son Broncs Weston, was born on August 15, 2016 via emergency c-section at 10 lb, 1 oz. The pair separated in early 2017 due to rumors of infidelity, however they have since reconciled.
37	2	"Katie"	March 27, 2012	1.70
Episode Summary: Katie Thayn (née Yeager) is from Rock Springs, Wyoming, and is pregnant by her live-in boyfriend, Joey Maes. Katie gives birth to a daughter, Molli J Maes, on August 18, 2011. The episode focuses on Katie's and Joey's desire to have their own home, and the financial struggles that entails. Post-Episode Update: The couple appeared as cast members on MTV's one-season series Teen Mom 3. While the couple became engaged after Molli's birth, they ended their relationship in 2013. As of 2015, Joey has a son, Graedyn, from the relationship with a woman named Karrie, but he is not involved in his life. Joey has another daughter, Khloe Madisyn Maes, born on May 10, 2015 to then-girlfriend Marissa Cintron. The pair welcomed a son, Jax, in August 2016. The pair wed in March 2017, according to social media posts. In 2016 a warrant was issued for Maes in Wyoming over $8000 of unpaid child support owed to Yeager. As of 2017, Katie is married to Tyler Thayn and they welcomed a baby girl named Reagan in March 2017.
38	3	"Briana"	April 3, 2012	1.41
Episode Summary: Briana DeJesus is from Orlando, Florida, and is pregnant by her ex-boyfriend, Devoin Austin II. The episode focuses on Devoin who has not shown significant interest in the pregnancy. Also, there is some tension in Briana's house because her sister became pregnant at the same time, but got an abortion, sending the sisters down two different paths. The baby girl, Nova Star DeJesus is born on September 9, 2011. The remainder of the episode focuses on Devoin's demands to be included the baby's life in spite of his unwillingness to contribute emotionally or financially. Post-Episode Update: Briana was one of four mothers selected as cast members of MTV's single-season series Teen Mom 3. In 2017, Briana was added to the cast of Teen Mom 2. as a fifth castmate. Briana gave birth to her second daughter, Stella Star, on July 2, 2017. Briana and the father, Luis Hernández, are no longer together.
39	4	"Lindsey"	April 10, 2012	1.64
Episode Summary: Lindsey Nicholson (née Harrison) is a teenager from Reno, Nevada, is an aspiring cage fighter who had to put cage fighting on hold when she became pregnant by Forest Ponce. Prior to the birth, the episode focuses on Lindsey needing support from Forest's family due to there being no room in her mother's house. On October 13, 2011, the day Lindsey's daughter, Aniyah Monroe Nicholson (née Harrison-Ponce) is born, Lindsey and her mother have a falling out in the hospital, with her mother walking out. Following the birth, the episode focuses on Lindsey's reconciling with her mother and Forest's unwillingness to help out financially with the baby. Forest and Lindsey have since ended their relationship. Post-Episode Update: In 2016, Lindsey underwent a breast augmentation surgery, performed by Michael Salzhauer, otherwise known as Dr. Miami. She increased her cup-size from an A to a 32G. As of 2017, Lindsey is married to T.J Nicholson and her husband has adopted Aniyah. She gave birth to Jackson James and Paisley Ann 10 weeks and 3 days prematurely on October 25, 2017.
40	5	"Alex"	April 17, 2012	1.44
Episode Summary: Alexandria "Alex" Peters (née Sekella) is an aspiring dancer from Allentown, Pennsylvania, who is pregnant by her boyfriend, Matt McCann. Prior to the birth, the episode focuses on Matt's undependability and Alex's mother making it clear that if Alex does not put the baby up for adoption, Alex and the baby will have no place to live. Alex struggles with the decision of whether to keep the baby or to allow her close friend's parents to adopt the baby and execute a very open adoption. Their daughter, Arabella "Bella" Elizabeth Peters (née Sekella-McCann), is born healthy on July 18, 2011. The remainder of the episode focuses on Alex's dire financial and housing troubles due to her decision to keep the baby, and her eventual relationship problems with Matt. Post-Episode Update: Alex was one of four of the season's mothers to be selected as castmates for the networks short-lived Teen Mom 3. Matt and Alex broke up between the filming of their 16 & Pregnant episode and Teen Mom 3. Alex has been dating Tim Peters since 2015. Alex married her boyfriend, Tim Peters on April 25, 2020 in her hometown in Pennsylvania. On January 30, 2022, Alex welcomed her second daughter, Althea Meredith Peters, with husband Tim. Matt welcomed his second child, a boy, Matthew "Matty" Milton McCann Jr., on January 15, 2016, with his wife, Lekota Koch. The couple have since separated following Matt's relapse and subsequent drug abuse.
41	6	"Jordan"	April 24, 2012	1.51
Episode Summary: Jordan Zeplin (née Howard) is a teenager from Lancaster, Pennsylvania, who is pregnant by Tyler Zeplin. There is enmity prior to the birth between Tyler and Jordan's mother, which Jordan ascribes to the Howards being black and the Zeplins being white. The episode focuses on that conflict, which is seemingly resolved just prior to the birth. Chase Alexander Zeplin is born healthy on May 31, 2011. Immediately following the birth, Tyler suddenly starts showing no interest in Jordan nor the baby, and the remainder of the episode focuses on that situation devolving. Post-Episode Update: On March 7, 2014, she and Tyler welcomed a baby girl, Skylar Aris. On October 24, 2015, Jordan and Tyler were married. They welcomed a second baby girl, Madison Brooke, on June 8, 2017. As of 2020, Jordan and Tyler have separated and she is now dating Christophe. Jordan and Tyler reconciled and on April 6, 2022, they both welcomed twin daughters, Khloe Star and Zoey Blue Zeplin. In September 2023, they welcomed their sixth child, Wes Led
42	7	"Myranda"	May 1, 2012	1.06
Episode Summary: Myranda Trevino-Kennemer (née Trevino) is a 17-year-old from San Augustine, Texas. She is pregnant by her boyfriend, Eric Kennemer, and they live together in a guest house on his grandmother's property. Their daughter, Kaylee Michelle Kennemer, is born on September 30, 2011, eight days early. This episode focuses on Myranda's distrust with her mother, who was an alcoholic and drug addict. Post-Episode Update: Myranda and Eric went on to marry in 2013 welcomed their second daughter, Ryleigh Paige on April 22, 2014. In early 2017, Eric was in a near-fatal vehicular accident and was hospitalized for two months before being able to return home. As of 2018, Myranda and Eric have separated.
43	8	"Hope"	May 8, 2012	1.32
Episode Summary: Hope Harbert is a 17-year-old from Lee's Summit, Missouri. She is pregnant by her on-and-off boyfriend, Ben Lagle. The episode initially focuses on Ben's initially wanting nothing to do with Hope upon learning of the pregnancy. Their son, Tristan Blaise Lagle, is born healthy on August 26, 2011 via emergency c-section. After the birth, the episode focuses on Hope's and Ben's growing romantic relationship and Hope's frustration at being housebound and her distance from her friends who've gone off to college. Post-Episode Update: Hope and Ben remain together and they welcomed a baby girl, Meia Grace, on April 28, 2017.
44	9	"Sarah"	May 15, 2012	1.39
Episode Summary: Sarah Fine (née Roberts) is a 17-year-old from Chickamauga, Georgia, who is pregnant by her boyfriend, Blake Thomas, a high school dropout. There is consistent enmity between Sarah's mother and Blake, which they temporarily resolve just before the birth. Tinleigh Louise Roberts, is born via c-section on June 18, 2011. Blake's relationship with Sarah and her mother erodes quickly after Tinleigh's birth, and the episode focuses on that tension and Blake's lack of emotional or financial support for Roberts and the baby. He eventually moves away to work on a shrimping boat, leaving his daughter in Sarah's care and not speaking to them often. Post-Episode Update: On October 1, 2013, Sarah gave birth to her second child, Tessly Jordan Lucille Fine, with her boyfriend, Justin Fine. Sarah and Justin are married by 2016 and the couple welcomed a baby girl, Kerrington Ray, on February 17, 2017.
45	10	"Sabrina"	May 15, 2012	1.37
Episode Summary: Sabrina Rosario (née Solares) is a 16-year-old cheerleader from Los Angeles, California, pregnant by her boyfriend, Iman Williams. After getting pregnant, she moves to Franklin, Tennessee, to be near her mother and the episode's focus is on Iman's promises to move to Tennessee and his lack of follow through on those promises. Due to complications, Sabrina is induced and Audrey Animi Solares is born on August 21, 2011 rushed to NICU, while Iman is still in California. Shortly thereafter, Iman shows up unannounced to live in Tennessee. The remainder of the episode focuses on Sabrina's building of her relationship with Iman while her relationship with the rest of her family suffers. Post-Episode Update: Sabrina and Iman would eventually separate. As of 2017, she is married to Albert Rosario.
46	11	"Devon"	May 22, 2012	1.25
Episode Summary: Devon Broyles is a 17-year-old high school senior from Richmond, Virginia, pregnant by her boyfriend, Colin Crowder, an Army reservist who served a tour in Iraq. At the end of an uneventful pregnancy, their son, Landon Levi Crowder, is born on November 4, 2011. The remainder of the episode focuses on their financial difficulties trying to buy their own home. Post-Episode Update: Devon and Colin are no longer a couple but they co-parent Landon. Colin and his new partner welcomed son Hudson Waverly on May 22, 2017. Devon had her second child, a daughter, Layla Monroe, on July 24, 2015, with her then-boyfriend, Eric Robinson. In 2017, Devon got engaged to Austin Gary.
47	12	"Kristina"	May 29, 2012	1.50
Episode Summary: Kristina Robinson-Head (née Robinson) is a rising high school senior from Waskom, Texas. She is pregnant by her boyfriend John "Todd" Hight, Jr. The episode opens with the revelation that Todd died in a drowning accident on a family outing on April 30, 2011, early in Kristina's pregnancy. In that incident, Kristina herself also nearly drowned. The episode focuses on Kristina managing her resultant grief from the tragedy, as well as having to work through the grief of those around her who were also affected. She also has to deal with the complications of early labor. Their son, Lukas Todd Hight, is born on September 26, 2011, two months early. After staying in the hospital for weeks, they finally bring Lukas home and Kristina adjusts to being a single teen mother. Post-Episode Update: Shortly after filming stopped, Kristina met and married T.J. Head. T.J. has one son from a previous relationship. Together the couple welcomed sons, Tommie Joseph Head, on January 9, 2013 and Layton Jax Head on February 12, 2014.
Special–10	Special–1	"Life After Labor Finale Special"	June 5, 2012	1.04
The cast from 16 and Pregnant share the stage and update Dr. Drew Pinsky on their heartbreaks, their challenges, and their triumphs over the past year. From explosive confrontations with teen dads to surprise engagements, this emotional finale delves into the issues pregnant teens face.
Special–11	Special–2	"Where Are They Now?"	September 8, 2013	0.60
Myranda, Sabrina, Sarah, Lindsey, Hope, Devon, Jordan, and Kristina catch up on where they're at today and reveal the changes in their lives.

=== Season 5 (2014) ===
No. overall	No. in season	Title	Original release date	US viewers (millions)
48	1	"Maddy"	April 14, 2014	N/A
Episode Summary: Maddy Godsey is a rising high school junior from Tinley Park, Illinois, who got pregnant after a one-night stand by Cody Jensen. Prior to the birth, Maddy's mother stated she would only allow her to stay in the house for a month after the baby is born. The episode focuses on Maddy's decision as to whether she will live with Cody and his family or to move an hour away to live with her father. Initially, she decides that she will live with Cody's family. Their daughter, Aubrey Lynn Godsey, is born healthy on October 20, 2013 and weighs 8 lb, 3 oz. Cody is no help to Maddy in the hospital following the birth, and in the first three weeks of Aubrey being home, Cody only comes to see his daughter once. As a result, Maddy decides to move to her dad's house rather than live with Cody and his family. Post-Episode Update: Cody is not currently involved in his daughter's life and he also has a son, Caleb, from another relationship, who was born two months prior to Aubrey's birth.
49	2	"Autumn"	April 21, 2014	1.21
Episode Summary: Autumn Crittendon (formerly Franklin and Oxley) is a 16-year-old high school sophomore from Richmond, Virginia, who is pregnant by boyfriend Dustin Franklin. Prior to the birth, the episode focuses on Autumn's concerns over the maturity of Dustin and his possible lack of fitness as a father, given that he is jobless and a regular marijuana smoker. Things come to a head when Dustin states that he will not give up marijuana when the baby is born, creating a scene in a restaurant. In spite of that, he does get a job and pass a home drug test before the baby is born. Drake LeSeuer Franklin is born healthy on December 17, 2013 and weighs 7 lb, 5 oz. After the birth, the episode focuses on Autumn's frustration at the complete lack of financial or logistical support for the baby by Dustin. This eventually leads to Autumn going to court to get child support from Dustin for Drake. Post-Episode Update: In 2015, speculation that Autumn was dating fellow 16 & Pregnant season 5 castmate Millina Kacmar. Autumn married Bradley Oxley in May 2017, following a one-month courtship. By late-summer, Autumn had announced the pair were separating via social media posts. She gave birth to her second son, Luke, in August 2019. On November 20th, 2022, she gave birth to a daughter named Abigail Ivy Rose with her boyfriend Dustin. On July 20th, 2024, she was found unresponsive and was pronounced deceased.
50	3	"Millina"	April 28, 2014	1.13
Episode Summary: Millina Kacmar is a 17-year-old high school dropout from Harrison Township, Michigan, who is pregnant by her boyfriend Trevor Davis. Prior to the birth, the episode focuses on Millina's trust issues with the various people in her life. While Millina has a good relationship with Trevor, Millina's mother is in jail on drug charges, her father is flaky, and Trevor's mother has significant anger management issues. Kayden James Michael Davis is born healthy on December 7, 2013 at 7 lb, 13 oz. After the birth, the episode focuses on Millina's growing estrangement with Trevor as he begins to side with his mother against Millina. Trevor and Millina are no longer together. Post-Episode Update: In 2015, speculation that Millina was dating fellow 16 & Pregnant season 5 castmate Autumn Crittendon (then also known as Autumn Franklin). In 2017, Millina welcomed her second child, daughter Scarlett Annabella with fiancée Dylan Borowicz on November 14, 2017. On May 31, 2020, Millina welcomed her third child, a girl named Violett Cecilia Gracelyn, who is her second child with Dylan.
51	4	"Arianna"	May 5, 2014	1.38
Episode Summary: Arianna Hazel is a high school senior from Smyrna, Georgia, who is pregnant by her ex-boyfriend Maurice. Prior to the baby's birth, the episode focuses on Arianna's ongoing frustration with Maurice's total lack of financial or emotional support through the pregnancy. Aiden Connor is born healthy on November 16, 2013, weighing 6 lb, 2 oz. Maurice is in the delivery room for the birth and things initially go well, but an argument ensues about Maurice's lack of ongoing support, leading to Arianna throwing Maurice out of her hospital room. The rest of the episode focuses on Maurice's lack of financial or emotional support, with him starting to provide some support towards the end of the episode.
52	5	"Summer"	May 12, 2014	1.06
Episode Summary: Summer James is a high school student from Collins, Georgia, who is pregnant by her boyfriend of three years, Daniel James "D.J." Rewis. Summer lives with D.J.'s parents and has a good relationship with them and D.J. However, Summer's mother has struggled with addiction throughout Summer's entire life and has not been there to raise Summer or her three half-sisters. The couple marry and their son, Peyton Daniel Rewis, is born shortly afterwards, on October 28, 2013, and weighs 7 lb, 8 oz. The remainder of the episode focuses on Summer deciding to get her GED rather than go back to high school and her mother's continuing addiction and legal troubles. Post-Episode Update: The couple welcomed their second son, Connor Mace, on June 7, 2016. As of 2018, Summer and DJ are no longer together. As of 2020, she is dating Tyler Rhodes and have birth to their daughter, Addison Kate Rhodes on 20th April 2020.
53	6	"Karley"	May 19, 2014	0.95
Episode Summary: Karley Deatherage (previously Shipley) is a 17-year-old, straight-A student from Tooele, Utah, who is expecting twins with Tony Shipley, a high school dropout. Following finding out she was pregnant with twins, Karley and Tony married, and Tony moved in with Karley and her parents. Prior to the birth, the episode focuses on how unhappy Tony is about living Karley's family home, and how he would rather he and Karley are living on their own. Karley goes into labor prematurely, and gives birth to daughters Amariah Dawn and Amayah Lynn Shipley on November 14, 2013, respectively weighing 4 lb, 14 oz, and 5 lb, 9 oz. Three weeks after the twins' birth, things start to unravel when, despite Karley's objections, Tony buys a second-hand truck that cannot be used as a family vehicle. This leads to Tony and Karley's mother getting into a screaming match which results in Tony storming out and going back to his parents' house. The episode concludes with Tony returning to Karley the next day and putting the truck up for sale. Post-Episode Update: Karley and Tony separated in 2015.
54	7	"Aleah"	May 26, 2014	0.79
Episode Summary: Aleah Lebeouf is an 18-year-old from Saint Louis, Missouri. She is pregnant by Shawn Burke, her boyfriend of two years that she met in juvenile detention. Shawn has custody of a young son, Noah, from a previous relationship. Prior to the birth, Aleah is surrounded only by supportive people including Shawn, her family, and Shawn's family. The focus is on Aleah's trying to manage the effect her Type 1 diabetes has on her pregnancy, along with hers and Shawn's inability to afford a place of their own due to all of his speeding tickets. Their daughter Peyton Reianne Burke, is born on December 13, 2013, weighing 7 lb, 8 oz. Initially, Peyton has breathing difficulties which cause her to spend time in the NICU, but she goes home healthy when she is three days old. Three weeks after the birth, Aleah and Shawn have a major falling out when Shawn gets another speeding ticket. The episode closes with their efforts to keep their relationship together and become financially stable. Post-Episode Update: Aleah and Shawn separated after filming. Her second child, son Julius Drake Page, was born on December 16, 2017. Shawn married his girlfriend Kayla, on May 2, 2020 in Missouri.
55	8	"Jazmin"	June 2, 2014	1.16
Episode Summary: Jazmin Young is a 17-year-old high school senior from Raytown, Missouri. She is pregnant by her boyfriend of nearly a year, Dell Williamson, who lives a block away. Prior to the birth, the episode focuses on Dell's disobeying the household rules set by Jazmin's parents, which include Jazmin and Dell not being allowed to be together unchaperoned in the house, and him having to leave by 10:00 pm. The episode also focuses on Jazmin's unpreparedness for the level of commitment that caring for a newborn will require. Laila Aubrielle Williamson is born healthy on October 17, 2013, weighing 6 lb, 13.5 oz. Following the birth, the episode focuses on Jazmin's challenges caring for a newborn, and Dell's frustration at the continued house rules which, combined with his limited free time due to his job, limit his access to his daughter.
56	9	"Savon"	June 9, 2014	1.34
Episode Summary: Savon Looney is a high school junior from Marietta, Georgia. She became pregnant via a hook-up with a man named Eli, who has children by other women and whom she is no longer in contact with. Prior to the birth, the episode focuses on Savon's relationship with her boyfriend, Mauwi. Although Savon and Mauwi are a committed couple, there is no physical intimacy due to Savon's lack of comfort getting intimate with Mauwi when she is pregnant with someone else's baby. Eden Lavon Looney, is born healthy on February 13, 2014, weighing 7 lb, 5 oz. Following the birth the episode focuses on Mauwi's mounting frustration with his lack of intimacy with Savon. Post-Episode Update: Mauwi and Savon have since broken up, and Savon is a single mother to her son. She had her second baby at the end of 2016.
57	10	"Jordan"	June 9, 2014	
Episode Summary: Jordan Cashmyer is from Baltimore, Maryland, and she is pregnant by her boyfriend Derek Taylor. Jordan was kicked out by her parents after she became pregnant by Derek and refused to stop seeing him. Prior to the birth, the episode focuses on Jordan's and Derek's challenges of effectively being homeless because Derek is not interested in getting a job and they have no local relatives to take them in. Genevieve "Evie" Shae Taylor, is born on March 7, 2014, weighing 7 lb, 5 oz. Following the birth, the episode focuses on Derek's continued lack of interest in working, leading to Jordan's and Derek's ongoing financial struggles and continued homelessness. Post-Episode Update: Jordan and Derek separated following filming. Initially, Jordan's father and stepmother shared custody of Genevieve with Derek. In 2015, however, Derek and Genevieve moved to his mother's house and Jordan signed over temporary custody to Derek's mother. In 2014, Derek revealed, via social media, that Jordan had been working at a strip club. Later that year, Jordan was hospitalized for mental health issues and a possible suicide attempt. Cashmyer has attended rehab on several occasions. In 2017, it was reported Jordan had been working as a prostitute after her images appeared on an escort website. The same year, Jordan was arrested for possession of cocaine and heroine. On June 20th, 2021, Jordan had a second daughter, Lyla, with her fiancé Michael Schaffer. On June 16, 2021, Derek welcomed his second daughter, Tully Jade Taylor. On January 15, 2022, Jordan passed away at the age of 26.
58	11	"Courtney"	June 16, 2014	0.92
Episode Summary: Courtney Snody (née Ames) is a 17-year-old high school senior from Woodland Park, Colorado, who is pregnant by her boyfriend Scott Snody. Since getting pregnant, Courtney has decided to be abstinent moving forward until marriage due to her religious convictions, which puts a strain on her committed relationship with Scott. Also, Courtney was born with a cleft lip and cleft palate, which required seven surgeries to correct. Her concerns about their forthcoming baby also having the same issues are confirmed with sonograms. Courtney moves in with Scott before the birth in order to provide the baby a stable family environment, but she insists on sleeping in separate bedrooms in order to stay abstinent, leading to further strain on the relationship. Dayton Cash is born on December 15, 2013, weighing 7 lb. He has a minor cleft lip that will likely be correctable with one surgery, and is otherwise healthy. In the weeks following the birth, the episode focuses on the stresses to Courtney's and Scott's relationship over unequal divisions of household labor and Courtney's continued commitment to her renewed purity pledge. Post-Episode Update: After a lengthy separation, Courtney and Scott reconciled and, in January of 2017 the pair married. The couple welcomed their second child, a boy named Porter Cove, on October 20, 2017.
59	12	"Savannah"	June 16, 2014	0.92
Episode Summary: Savannah Mooney is a 17-year-old high school student from Jefferson City, Missouri. She is pregnant by Stone Nesmith, her ex-boyfriend. Savannah's mother is an alcoholic, and Stone's issues with Savannah's mother are a primary reason that Savannah and Stone broke up. Prior to the birth, Savannah struggles with her mother's alcoholism and with how she is going to co-parent with Stone in spite of them no longer being a couple. Rowan James is born healthy on February 27, 2014, weighing 7 lb, 5 oz. Following the birth, the episode focuses on Savannah's continuing struggle with her mother's alcoholism. Post-Episode Update: Stone is currently not part of his son's life and Savannah is raising Rowan with her mother's help. Savannah gave birth to her second son, Samuel "Sam" Joseph, on June 6, 2016, with her ex-boyfriend Malcolm, and she chose for him to be adopted.
Special–12	Special–1	"Life After Labor Finale Special"	July 1, 2014	0.93
All twelve moms and thirteen children from Season 5 appear with Dr. Drew Pinsky to discuss their struggles and provide updates on their lives and relationships.
Special–13	Special–2	"Unseen Moments"	July 1, 2014	N/A
Special–14	Special–3	"Where Are They Now?"	July 28, 2014	N/A
All 12 girls from Season 5 with updates and interviews from the cast members and their loved ones.

=== Season 6 (2020–21) ===
No. overall	No. in season	Title	Original release date	US viewers (millions)
60	1	"Madisen"	October 6, 2020	0.49
Episode Summary: Madisen is a 16-year-old from Heber Springs, Arkansas, who became pregnant at age 15 by her now 18-year-old boyfriend, Christian. Madisen lives with her very supportive father and has a good support network. She is estranged from her mother who lost custody of Madisen when Madisen was five years old, and whom Madisen has not seen for over three years. After a smooth pregnancy, Camille Victoria is born on March 10, 2020 at 8:47pm, weighing 6 pounds, 5 ounces. The episode focuses on Christian's lack of ambition as the birth approaches, when he quits his job that requires travel before the birth, but does not find another one. After the birth, tension gets worse between Madisen and Christian when Christian still has not found a job and is not adequately contributing sweat equity to fitting out their new tiny house. The March 2020 panic over COVID-19 adds to the tension between Madisen and Christian as a state of emergency is declared and there are empty shelves in the supermarket with a newborn baby at home. The on-site production crew is sent home due to COVID-19 and the remainder of the episode is self-produced by Madisen. Christian walks out when Camille is four weeks old, leaving Madisen as the sole day-to-day parent. As the episode concludes, Madisen decides to block contact with her mother who had been trying to renew their relationship via text during Madisen's pregnancy.
61	2	"Rachelle"	October 13, 2020	0.35
Episode Summary: Rachelle is a straight-A student from Tujunga, California, who became pregnant by a man she'd been dating for two months, Chase, a full-time electrician, that she met at the gym. Rachelle's pregnancy is heartbreaking for her Guatamalen-immigrant parents because they had big dreams for her, and both of her older sisters had gotten pregnant as teenagers. As a result of the pregnancy, Rachelle has moved in with Chase, and Rachelle feels that things have fallen apart ever since. Rachelle and Chase are still just getting to know each other, and Chase is very controlling. Rachelle has not seen any of her friends since she got pregnant. She is home alone all day with no social outlet and without seeing her family, and Chase has no sympathy for her situation. Rachelle tries to get some social connection renewed with her parents by meeting them for breakfast, but she walks out before it's over due to their pressuring her about her situation. Rachelle has her baby shower at 30 weeks, which goes very well other than the fact that out of all the people there, only two of them were her pre-pregnancy friends. At the 37 week point in the pregnancy, things take an ugly turn when Chase concludes during a 3D ultrasound that the fetus "doesn't look anything like" him, and he states about the baby that Rachelle "better hope that she comes out with blue eyes". This is followed by Rachelle's family more strongly starting to turn on Chase. The delivery with both Chase and Rachelle's mom in the delivery room goes surprisingly well and Boston Sofia is born on January 15, 2020, weighing 8 pounds and 12 ounces. Following the birth, Chase does not allow Rachelle's family over to their apartment, and he begins to gaslight her about her family. At the two month mark, the COVID-19 restrictions force the episode to transition to self-production. The situation combined with post-partum depression is too much for Rachelle, and she moves back in with her family, with Chase refusing to accept any blame for the situation. Both sides say they want to work it out, but a reconciliation meeting does not go well at all. The episode ends with Rachelle back in school deciding to move back in with Chase.
62	3	"Maddie"	October 20, 2020	0.34
Episode Summary: Maddie is an 18-year-old from New Braunfels, Texas, who is pregnant by her boyfriend Korey. Maddie and her mother, Crystal, used to be best friends, but Maddie's relationship with Korey has driven a wedge between them. Korey and Crystal have butted heads since Day One of Maddie's and Korey's relationship, as Korey is on probation from drug charges and has cheated on Maddie in the past. The situation drove Maddie to move in with Korey and his mother in a one-bedroom apartment, and Maddie got pregnant there within a few weeks of moving in. The episode starts at the 34 week point in the pregnancy. Korey has lost his job due to a probation violation, which means they cannot afford a place of their own before the birth. At 37 weeks, the tension is particularly high because Crystal is planning a girls-only baby shower for Maddie, but Korey insists on attending, and his attendance creates an awkward situation for everyone. Due to Maddie's discomfort of coming home with a new baby with Korey's relatives all around, Korey moves in with Maddie and her mom, under the guise of Korey staying off drugs, helping with household chores, and getting a job immediately. At 39 weeks, Korey still has not found a job, and Crystal wonders how motivated he is to find one. Korey gets good news when his probation is dismissed. A first-time meeting of Korey's mother and Crystal is arranged at a local restaurant, and it goes better than expected, given the situation. At 40 weeks, Maddie's water breaks, and Korey takes her to the natural birthing center. The natural birthing is a very unpleasant experience for Maddie because she is unable to handle the pain involved. Nonetheless, Kazleight Ka'mya is born healthy on February 12, 2020, weighing 6 pounds 7 ounces. The episode resumes one week after the birth. The first few days are good as Korey has gotten a job washing dishes, but things have since gone bad again between Korey and Crystal, with Maddie caught in the middle without the maturity to navigate the situation. COVID-19 restrictions then shift the episode to being self-produced, as Korey loses his job due to the COVID-19 shutdowns. Crystal smells marijuana on Korey and, as a result, kicks Korey out. Korey then forces Maddie to move with him to his aunt's house if she wants Korey to stay involved in the baby's life. Crystal and Maddie have a very antagonistic phone call about the situation, resulting in Maddie siding with Korey. The episode concludes with Maddie and Korey moving into an apartment that they leased with Korey's unemployment benefits.
63	4	"Camryn"	October 27, 2020	0.31
Episode Summary: Camryn is a 16-year-old from Monroe, Michigan, who became pregnant by her 18-year-old boyfriend, Cam. Camryn lives with her mother and stepfather, with Cam living with his older brother. The episode focuses on the ongoing enmity between Camryn's mother and Cam, and how the COVID-19 pandemic is exacerbating the situation. Due to pandemic restrictions, the episode had to be self-produced, and Camryn is schooling at home. Both Camryn and Cam had lost their jobs due to the pandemic, but Camryn got her job back at the 34-week point in the pregnancy. The pandemic restrictions limiting them to only one person in the delivery room significantly stokes the discord between Camryn's mother and Cam when Camryn selects Cam to be with her for the delivery. Camryn is very stressed about being able to financially provide for the baby, and becomes obsessed with whether the baby shower will happen, and what gifts she will receive. Camryn's water breaks two weeks early, on the day of the baby shower, and Sadie Paige is delivered, healthy, via emergency C-section on June 18, 2020, weighing 6 pounds, 14 ounces. Following the birth, things are initially good in Camryn's home, but tension builds between Camryn's mother and Cam over Cam not doing required chores around the house. Camryn and Cam eventually both go back to work, and the episode concludes with them letting Camryn's parents know they will be moving out to a townhouse.
64	5	"Kash"	November 10, 2020	0.31
Episode Summary: Kash is an 18-year-old from Avondale, Arizona, who became pregnant by her on-again / off-again 18-year-old boyfriend, Nate. Kash lives with her grandmother and twin siblings, and had planned to go into the Navy after high school graduation. The episode is self-produced because the COVID-19 pandemic restrictions started when Kash was five months pregnant. The episode focuses on the intermittent nature of Kash's and Nate's romantic relationship, due to Nate's anger management issues. At the start of the episode, Nate has moved to California due to clashes with his family at his home in Arizona, but he moves back to Arizona at the 37-week mark in the pregnancy. Both Kash and Nate are committed to the baby, but cannot seem to work things out with their relationship with each other. Kash graduates high school before the birth, but her water breaks the day after her baby shower, and after 30 hours labor, Nova Marie is born healthy on July 2, 2020, weighing 6 lbs 2 oz., 20" long. Nate's anger management issues start to surface immediately following the baby shower, and grow worse at the hospital during the birth, leading Kash to break up with Nate the day after Nova is brought home. This leads to Nate throwing a brick through the window of Kash's car, engendering the possibility of domestic violence and vandalism charges against Nate. As the episode concludes, Kash permanently ends her romantic relationship with Nate, and both commit to co-parenting. Kash also makes plans to go into the Navy Reserve, and renews her relationship with her mother after gaining a better understanding of why her mother gave her up.
65	6	"Kali"	November 17, 2020	0.33
Episode Summary: Kali is a 15-year-old from La Porte, Indiana, who became pregnant by her 15-year-old boyfriend, Auston. They are both high school freshmen. As the episode begins, Auston has de facto moved in with Kali and her parents, to the mild consternation of Kali's parents. This leads to ongoing discussions between Kali's parents about when Auston will move back home with his grandparents, and Kali's being overly dependent on Auston. The episode unfolds showing the COVID-19 restrictions' effects on the pregnancy, such as reducing Kali's baby shower to a surprise drive-by event, and concern about Kali only being allowed to invite one person into the delivery room with her. The delivery room situation is eventually resolved by the OB making an exception because Kali is a minor, and both her mother and the baby's father being allowed in. Due to COVID-19 considerations, Kali's labor is induced a week before her due date. After 27 hours of labor, Bodhi Oliver is born healthy, June 6, 2020, at 6:07pm, 7 lbs 11 oz, 20 3/4" long. Two weeks after the birth, Kali has just recovered from an epidural puncture that happened during the birth. The issue left her effectively bedridden with really bad headaches since the birth and unable to bond with Bodhi, and she is also struggling with her loss of identity. Ten weeks after the birth, Auston is still living with Kali and her parents, and is fully engaged as a father. However, that is leading to a co-dependency problem between Kali and Auston, and he is flunking all of his classes as a sophomore in virtual schooling. Kali's father wants Auston to move back home with his grandparents to get Kali's and Auston's lives separately back on track, but Auston is hesitant because his mother abandoned him when he was 4 years old, and he doesn't want to do that to Bodhi. As Auston leverages to spend time at his home with his grandparents, Kali is resistant and her dependency on him leads to a showdown. The episode ends as Bodhi turns six months old and Auston moves back home with Kali beginning to parent on her own.
66	7	"Selena"	March 16, 2021	0.33
67	8	"Shelby"	March 23, 2021	0.29
68	9	"Kyla"	March 30, 2021	0.28
69	10	"Abygail"	April 6, 2021	0.33
70	11	"Taylor"	April 13, 2021	0.36
