= Teen Mom 2 =

American reality TV series

- Genre: Reality television
- Created by: Lauren Dolgen
- Starring: Chelsea DeBoer; Jenelle Evans; Kailyn Lowry; Leah Messer; Briana DeJesus; Jade Cline; Ashley Jones
- Country of origin: United States
- Original language: English
- No. of seasons: 11
- No. of episodes: 211 (list of episodes)

Production
- Executive producers: Morgan J. Freeman; Dia Sokol Savage; Lauren Dolgen; Kendra Macleod
- Running time: 60 minutes
- Production companies: 11th Street Productions; MTV Entertainment Studios

Original release
- Network: MTV
- Release: January 11, 2011 – May 24, 2022

Related
- 16 and Pregnant; Teen Mom; Teen Mom 3; Teen Mom: Family Reunion; Teen Mom: Girls' Night In; Teen Mom: The Next Chapter; Teen Mom: Young and Pregnant; Teen Mom: Young Moms Club

Teen Mom 2 is an American reality television series that premiered January 11, 2011 on MTV. It originally followed the lives of Jenelle Evans, Chelsea DeBoer, Kailyn Lowry, and Leah Messer from the second season of 16 and Pregnant as they navigated their first years of motherhood. The series also focused on the changing relationships between family, friends, and boyfriends, while highlighting the struggles of young mothers raising children.

In June 2017, it was announced that former Teen Mom 3 star Briana DeJesus would join the cast of Teen Mom 2. In May 2019, following Evans' firing from the show, it was announced that Teen Mom: Young and Pregnant star Jade Cline would join the cast. In October 2020, DeBoer announced her departure from the series after 10 seasons. In December 2020, it was reported that Ashley Jones from Teen Mom: Young and Pregnant would be joining the show to replace DeBoer.

After its last episode on May 24, 2022, the series was merged into Teen Mom OG, with cast members of each series transitioning to a combined series titled Teen Mom: The Next Chapter, which premiered on September 6, 2022.

== Cast ==
=== Jenelle Evans ===
Jenelle Lauren Evans (from Oak Island, North Carolina) gave birth to her son Jace on August 2, 2009. Jace's father, Andrew Lewis, rarely appears on the show. Evans struggled with substance addiction throughout her time on Teen Mom 2. As a result, Jenelle's mother Barbara Evans was awarded custody of Jace when he was less than nine months old to prevent Jace from being removed from Jenelle's custody and placed into foster care. In March 2023, Barbara relinquished custody of Jace to Jenelle. In May 2025, Lewis and Evans decided it was in Jace's best interest for him to stay with Lewis temporarily.

On December 4, 2012, Evans married Courtland Rogers. The couple got engaged in November 2012 and announced her second pregnancy. On January 25, 2013, Evans and Rogers split, and she had an abortion, which she told Courtland was a miscarriage.

In June 2013, Evans started dating Nathan Griffith. Within months of dating they moved in together and she became pregnant with their first child. On December 14, 2013, Evans was arrested for disturbing the peace after an argument with Griffith. On June 29, 2014, Evans gave birth to her second child, son Kaiser Orion Griffith. In January 2015, Evans and Griffith got engaged, but they broke off the engagement that August. After their breakup, the former couple became engaged in a custody battle over Kaiser. In January 2017, Evans and Griffith reached a joint custody agreement in court.

In September 2015, Evans started dating David Eason, an alleged pipewelder she met on Tinder, and the two quickly moved in together. Eason previously met Evans' ex-husband, Courtland Rogers, when they were cellmates in prison. David has two children from previous relationships: daughter Maryssa Rose and son Kaden David. Evans gave birth to their first child together, daughter Ensley Jolie Eason, on January 24, 2017. The couple got married on September 23, 2017. On October 13, 2018, police were called to Evans' house because of a physical assault involving Eason. According to Evans, Eason slammed her to the ground and broke her collarbone. Evans went to the hospital following the incident. Evans claimed that Eason had been drinking, which contributed to the assault. Evans decided to not press charges and no police report was filed. In April 2019, it was reported that Eason beat and shot Evans' dog, Nugget, which led to Evans being fired from the Teen Mom franchise. In February 2024, Evans filed for legal separation and divorce from David, which resulted in him and his daughter Maryssa moving out of Evans' home. Maryssa went to live with her mother and stepfather, while David moved into his and Evans' boat temporarily. Evans was able to sign over their house to Eason through their agreement in their divorce. She has since moved out of North Carolina with her three children. Evans has cut all contact with her mother, Barbara, and has not seen nor spoken to her since Jace was returned to Evans after he spent approximately two months in foster care.

=== Chelsea DeBoer ===
Chelsea Anne DeBoer (née Houska) (from Sioux Falls, South Dakota) is the mother of Aubree Skye Lind-DeBoer (born September 7, 2009). After giving birth to her daughter, DeBoer's life became consumed with taking care of herself and trying to make her tumultuous relationship with Aubree's father, Adam Lind, succeed. She obtained her GED after years of working towards it and has begun attending beauty school. During the sixth season, Houska was in a custody battle with Lind over Aubree. Lind wanted joint custody, while DeBoer wanted to keep the current custody arrangement. In March 2015, the court ruled in DeBoer's favor.

In late 2014, Chelsea met Cole DeBoer, and the two began dating. Chelsea introduced Cole in the season six premiere of Teen Mom 2 and the two eventually moved in together. The couple became engaged on November 18, 2015, and married on October 1, 2016. On January 25, 2017, Chelsea and Cole welcomed their first child, son Watson Cole DeBoer. On August 29, 2018 (her 27th birthday), Chelsea welcomed her third child, a girl named Layne Ettie DeBoer. On January 25, 2021, Chelsea gave birth to daughter Walker June.

In October 2020, Houska announced her departure from the series following the conclusion of season 10A. Since 2023, Houska and DeBoer have starred in their own show, Down Home Fab, on HGTV.

=== Kailyn Lowry ===
Kailyn Rae Lowry (from Whitehall Township, Pennsylvania) gave birth to her first child Isaac on January 18, 2010. At the time, Lowry was living with the family of Isaac's father, Jo Rivera. Lowry's relationship with Rivera crumbled under the stress of balancing their lives and raising their child, and Lowry moved out amidst their constant fighting. A romance with Lowry's coworker Jordan got more serious as she turned to him for emotional support during the custody battle with Rivera.

During season 4, Lowry developed a relationship with Javi Marroquin. The two got engaged after a few months of dating, and married on September 4, 2013. Lowry gave birth to their first child, son Lincoln Marshall Marroquin, on November 16, 2013. The couple filed for divorce in December 2015.

On August 5, 2017, Lowry gave birth to her third son, Lux Russell Lowry. Lowry's fourth son, Creed Romello Lopez, was born on July 30, 2020. The father of both Lux and Creed is Chris Lopez.

=== Leah Messer ===
Leah Dawn Messer (previously Simms and Calvert, from Elkview, West Virginia) is a former cheerleader and the teen mother of twins Aliannah Hope "Ali" and Aleeah Grace "Gracie" (born December 16, 2009). From a small town outside of Charleston, West Virginia. On the show, Messer and ex-husband Corey Simms eventually learned that Ali has Titin muscular dystrophy.

In August 2011, Messer started dating Jeremy Calvert. They married on April 4, 2012, after eight months of dating, and had their first child, daughter Adalynn Faith "Addie" Calvert, on February 4, 2013. In April 2015, Calvert filed for divorce from Messer after three years of marriage. On June 8, 2015, the couple finalized their divorce. Messer was given custody of Addie, while Calvert received visitation rights.

Messer dated Jason Jordan, a medical salesman she met through his cousin, starting in April 2018, but they split in October that same year.

=== Briana DeJesus ===
Briana DeJesus (from Orlando, Florida) got pregnant by her ex-boyfriend, DeVoin Austin II. Her first daughter Nova Star DeJesus was born on September 10, 2011. Previously one-fourth of the cast for Teen Mom 3 and a participant on Family Therapy with Dr. Jenn, DeJesus' casting for Teen Mom 2 was announced on June 5, 2017. DeJesus gave birth to her second daughter, Stella Star, on July 2, 2017. The father is Luis Hernández.

=== Jade Cline ===
Jade Cline (from Indianapolis, Indiana) is the mother of Kloie Kenna Austin who was born on September 18, 2017. The father is her husband Sean Austin. Previously part of the Teen Mom: Young and Pregnant cast, Cline's casting was confirmed in May 2019, replacing Jenelle Eason.

=== Ashley Jones ===
Ashley Jones (from Vallejo, California) is the mother of Holly Isabella Lockett who was born on September 15, 2017. Holly's father is Ashley's husband, Bariki Smith. Previously part of the Teen Mom: Young and Pregnant cast, Jones' casting was announced in December 2020, replacing Chelsea DeBoer.

=== Timeline of cast members ===
Cast member	Seasons															
Cast member	1	2	3	4	5a	5b	6	7a	7b	8a	8b	9a	9b	10a	10b	11
Chelsea DeBoer	Main	Main	Main	Main	Main	Main	Main	Main	Main	Main	Main	Main	Main	Main		
Jenelle Eason	Main	Main	Main	Main	Main	Main	Main	Main	Main	Main	Main	Main				
Kailyn Lowry	Main	Main	Main	Main	Main	Main	Main	Main	Main	Main	Main	Main	Main	Main	Main	Main
Leah Messer	Main	Main	Main	Main	Main	Main	Main	Main	Main	Main	Main	Main	Main	Main	Main	Main
Briana DeJesus										Main	Main	Main	Main	Main	Main	Main
Jade Cline													Main	Main	Main	Main
Ashley Jones															Main	Main

== Episodes ==
Season	Episodes		Originally released	
Season	Episodes		First released	Last released
1	12		January 11, 2011	March 29, 2011
2	12		December 6, 2011	February 14, 2012
3	13		November 12, 2012	February 4, 2013
4	12		February 18, 2013	April 29, 2013
5	25	13	January 21, 2014	April 13, 2014
5	25	12	July 16, 2014	October 1, 2014
6	12		July 9, 2015	September 24, 2015
7	24	12	March 21, 2016	June 6, 2016
7	24	12	January 2, 2017	March 13, 2017
8	31	18	July 17, 2017	November 6, 2017
8	31	13	May 7, 2018	July 30, 2018
9	30	18	January 14, 2019	May 13, 2019
9	30	12	September 10, 2019	November 26, 2019
10	30	18	September 1, 2020	December 29, 2020
10	30	12	May 4, 2021	July 20, 2021
11	10		March 8, 2022	May 10, 2022
