= 16 and Pregnant =

American reality television series

- Genre: Tragicomedy
- Created by: Lauren Dolgen
- Country of origin: United States
- Original language: English
- No. of seasons: 6
- No. of episodes: 70 (list of episodes)

Production
- Executive producers: Morgan J. Freeman; Dia Sokol Savage; Lauren Dolgen; Kevin T. Hunley; Andrew Portnoy; Sara Cohen; Janay Dutton; Jordan Dugger
- Camera setup: Multiple
- Production companies: 11th Street Productions; MTV Production Development

Original release
- Network: MTV
- Release: June 11, 2009 – April 13, 2021

Related
- Teen Mom; Teen Mom 2; Teen Mom 3; Teen Mom: Young and Pregnant; 16 and Recovering

16 and Pregnant is an American reality television series that aired from June 11, 2009, to July 1, 2014, on the cable channel MTV. It followed the stories of pregnant teenage girls in high school dealing with the hardships of teenage pregnancy. Each episode featured a different teenage girl, with the episode typically beginning when she is 4 1/2 – 8 months into her pregnancy. The episode typically ends when the baby is a few months old. The series is produced in a documentary format, with an animation on notebook paper showing highlights during each episode preceding the commercial breaks.

16 and Pregnant has spawned five spin-off series: Teen Mom, Teen Mom 2, Teen Mom 3, Teen Mom: Young and Pregnant, and 16 and Recovering, which premiered on September 1, 2020.

In September 2020, it was announced that a sixth season would premiere on October 6, 2020.

== Episodes ==
Season	Episodes	Originally released	
Season	Episodes	First released	Last released
1	6	June 11, 2009	July 16, 2009
2	19	February 16, 2010	December 21, 2010
3	10	April 19, 2011	June 21, 2011
4	12	March 27, 2012	May 29, 2012
5	12	April 14, 2014	July 28, 2014
6	11	October 6, 2020	April 13, 2021

== Reception ==
Based on a preview of the show's first three episodes, The New York Times called the series a "documentary-style series about real-life Junos who are not scoring in the 99th percentile on the verbal portion of their SATs... despite its showcasing of the grim, hard work of single mothering."

In 2011, the Social Security Administration reported that the names of one of the featured mothers and her son, "Maci" and "Bentley", were the names that saw the greatest increase in frequency over the past year.

In 2016, a New York Times study of the 50 TV shows with the most Facebook Likes found that "similar to Teen Mom, 16 and Pregnant is more popular in rural parts of the country".

Producers of 16 and Pregnant have been criticized for their lack of diversity and inaccurate representation of teenage mothers within the cast. When comparing the mothers on 16 and Pregnant to the U.S. National Vital Statistic Report on Teenage Pregnancy, researchers found MTV overrepresented births to mothers age 15–17 at the time of birth and also overrepresented white teenage mothers. Teenage pregnancy with mothers 15–17 years of age at birth accounted for 22% of the national average with teenage pregnancy for white mothers being reported at 22%. Within the first five seasons of 16 and Pregnant, white teenage mothers made up more than two-thirds of the show participants. 48% of the mothers were 16 at the time of birth, 39% were 17, and 11% were 18–19.

== Impact ==
16 and Pregnant was created as a method of early intervention in teenage pregnancy prevention. At the time of its premiere, producers defended the show with arguments that 16 and Pregnant would educate teenage girls on the realities of pregnancy and teenage motherhood. Research indicates that the show had mixed effects on the teenage girls it sought to target.

In 2009, The National Campaign to Prevent Teen and Unplanned Pregnancy recognized 16 and Pregnant among the factors that caused a decrease in teenage pregnancy recorded over the year. A 2012 survey by The National Campaign also praises the show for encouraging discussion regarding teenage pregnancy between viewers aged 10–19, their peers, and their parents.

Viewership of 16 and Pregnant was found to be most successful as a method of intervention for teens aged 15–16 living in states that do not require sex education to be taught in schools. The study concluded that "women in states without [SexEd] mandates may have lacked access to information on sex and contraception, which became more readily available via links to stayteen.org in the after the debut of 16 and Pregnant".

16 and Pregnant has also been criticized for glamorizing teenage pregnancy and motherhood. Research in 2014 suggests young girls who are frequent viewers of 16 and Pregnant were more likely to have an unrealistic perception of teenage motherhood. Additionally, the researchers discovered that viewers perceived the benefits of teen pregnancy to be greater than the risks, given the positive conclusions in participants' stories.

In 2014, the National Bureau of Economic Research conducted and published a study suggesting a correlation between the premiere of the show in 2009 and a 5.7% of the total 17.6% decrease in teen births in the US in the 18 months following the premiere. It was unknown whether this was due to the premiere of 16 and Pregnant or the 2008 financial crisis. However, the study showed increased search activity about birth control and abortion and sparked relevant conversation via Twitter. The study looked at different factors to come up with their conclusion: exposure to the television show, increase in searches on birth control during times the show aired, in what region, and how popular the show was in those specific areas. The study concluded that there was indeed a correlation between viewership and the search of these topics, indicating the show did have an effect on the decline of teen pregnancy rates at the time. They estimate that 1/3 of the decrease in teen pregnancy rate was directly due to the show airing. There was also a decrease in rates of abortion, but the study did not research the subject enough to know if that was due to the show. In 2014, the Brookings Institution conducted and published a study suggesting a correlation between the premiere of the show in 2009 and a 5.7% decrease in teen births in the 18 months following the premiere. At the time, it was unknown whether this was due to the premiere of 16 and Pregnant or other factors.

Research conducted in 2016 suggested that 16 and Pregnant was unlikely to have had any effect on teenage birth rates and prior research to be "problematic." The latest study revealed, through a series of placebo and other tests, that the correlation between common trends in birth rates, and regional viewership of MTV, is not founded.

== Spin-offs ==
Spin-offs of 16 and Pregnant
Title	Series premiere	Series finale	No. of seasons
Teen Mom	December 8, 2009	December 7, 2021	9
Teen Mom 2	January 11, 2011	May 24, 2022	11
Teen Mom 3	August 26, 2013	November 18, 2013	1
Teen Mom: Young and Pregnant	March 12, 2018	September 13, 2022	3
Teen Mom: Young Moms Club	August 30, 2018	May 20, 2019	1
Teen Mom: Family Reunion	January 11, 2022		3
Teen Mom: Girls' Night In	January 11, 2022	December 27, 2022	2
Teen Mom: The Next Chapter	September 6, 2022		2

== International versions ==
Country	Title	Original channel	Premiere date	No. of seasons	Ref.
Ukraine	Вагітна у 16	STB	August 27, 2012	3	
Italy	16 anni e Incinta	MTV	September 23, 2013	8	
Russia	Беременна в 16	U	March 1, 2019	7	
