= Dia Sokol Savage =

American film producer

Dia Sokol Savage is an American film and television producer, director and writer. She is best known as the executive producer of MTV's hit series 16 & Pregnant and Teen Mom franchise and as a producer on Andrew Bujalski's films Mutual Appreciation and Beeswax. She currently runs 11th Street Productions with her producing partner Morgan J. Freeman.

== Background ==
Sokol Savage was born in West Virginia and grew up in Denver, Colorado. She graduated from Smith College and currently resides in Brooklyn, NY with her husband Garret Savage, a film editor.

== Career ==
=== Film ===
After college, Dia moved to Boston and started working for documentary director Errol Morris on projects such as Mr. Death, The Fog of War and his television series, First Person. While there, she befriended Justin Rice who introduced her to Andrew Bujalski on the day Andrew moved back to Boston from Los Angeles. Soon after, Bujalski made Funny Ha Ha, a project he'd been trying to get off the ground in LA and ultimately shot in Boston. The film is credited with launching the mumblecore film movement. Dia later produced Bujalski's Mutual Appreciation and Beeswax.

After she met Joe Swanberg at SXSW in 2005, the two decided to collaborate and joined forces with Greta Gerwig, producer Anish Savjani and cinematographer Matthias Grunsky to make Nights and Weekends. In 2006, Dia went to the bayou of Arkansas to produce Alex Karpovsky's film, Woodpecker. In 2010, she was nominated for the Independent Spirit Awards Piaget Producers Award.

In 2009, Dia's feature film directing debut, Sorry, Thanks, premiered at the SXSW Film Festival and was later distributed by IFC Films. It featured Wiley Wiggins and Kenya Miles in the main roles. She was awarded the Adrienne Shelley Director's Grant for her work on this film.

=== Television ===
Sokol Savage was a producer on Queer Eye for the Straight Guy, Kimora: Life in the Fab Lane, #1 Single featuring Lisa Loeb, Wife Swap and numerous other shows before responding to a Facebook post by Morgan J. Freeman who was looking for a producing partner for an MTV pilot in 2008.

She got the job and the two went on to be the executive producers of MTV's series 16 and Pregnant, Teen Mom, Teen Mom 2, and Teen Mom 3. Together, they launched 11th Street Productions, a film and TV production company.

== Links ==
- "Hammer to Nail", SORRY, THANKS, by Lena Dunham, March 15, 2009
- "SF360", 'Sorry, Thanks' Lavishes Love on the Mission, October 24, 2009
- "The Big Picture: Weekend of festivals starts off with a BAM". NY Daily News. June 18, 2009. Archived from the original on September 13, 2014.
- Dia Sokol Savage at IMDb
