= Chlotrudis Award for Best Actress =

Annual US film award

- Awarded for: Best Actress
- Location: United States
- First award: 1995; 29 years ago
- Currently held by: Lily Gladstone for The Unknown Country
- Website: chlotrudis.org/

The Chlotrudis Award for Best Actress is an annual award presented by the Chlotrudis Society for Independent Films, a non-profit organization, founded in 1994, that recognizes achievements in independent and world cinema. The awards were first presented in 1995, and were named after founder Michael Colford and his boyfriend Trent's two cats, Chloe and Gertrudis.

== Winners and nominees ==
=== 1990s ===
Year	Actress	Character	Film
1995 (1st)
1995 (1st)	Judy Davis	Katherine Witner / Caroline Chasseur	The New Age / The Ref
1995 (1st)	Linda Fiorentino	Bridget Gregory / Wendy Kroy	The Last Seduction
1995 (1st)	Gong Li	Jiazhen	To Live
1995 (1st)	Julianne Moore	Yelena	Vanya on 42nd Street
1995 (1st)	Winona Ryder	Jo March	Little Women
1995 (1st)	Kathleen Turner	Beverley Sutphin	Serial Mom
1996 (2nd)
1996 (2nd)	Susan Sarandon	Sister Helen Prejean	Dead Man Walking
1996 (2nd)	Kathy Bates	Dolores Claiborne	Dolores Claiborne
1996 (2nd)	Nicole Kidman	Suzanne Stone Moretto	To Die For
1996 (2nd)	Julianne Moore	Carol White	Safe
1996 (2nd)	Elisabeth Shue	Sera	Leaving Las Vegas
1996 (2nd)	Emma Thompson	Elinor Dashwood	Sense and Sensibility
1997 (3rd)
1997 (3rd)	Frances McDormand	Marge Gunderson	Fargo
1997 (3rd)	Brenda Blethyn	Cynthia Purley	Secrets & Lies
1997 (3rd)	Linda Henry	Sandra Gangel	Beautiful Thing
1997 (3rd)	Catherine Keener	Amelia	Walking & Talking
1997 (3rd)	Lili Taylor	Valerie Solanas	I Shot Andy Warhol
1997 (3rd)	Emily Watson	Bess McNeill	Breaking the Waves
1998 (4th)
1998 (4th)	Helena Bonham Carter	Kate Croy / Margaret MacNeil	The Wings of the Dove / Margaret's Museum
1998 (4th)	Judy Davis	Joan Fraser	Children of the Revolution
1998 (4th)	Minnie Driver	Debi Newberry	Grosse Pointe Blank
1998 (4th)	Alison Folland	Claude	All Over Me
1998 (4th)	Helen Hunt	Carol Connelly	As Good As It Gets
1998 (4th)	Sarah Polley	Nicole Burnell	The Sweet Hereafter
1998 (4th)	Emma Thompson	Frances	The Winter Guest
1999 (5th)
1999 (5th)	Cate Blanchett	Elizabeth I	Elizabeth
1999 (5th)	Drew Barrymore	Danielle / Julia Sullivan	Ever After / The Wedding Singer
1999 (5th)	Fernanda Montenegro	Dora	Central Station
1999 (5th)	Christina Ricci	DeeDee Pruitt / Layla	The Opposite of Sex / Buffalo '66
1999 (5th)	Ally Sheedy	Lucy Berliner	High Art
1999 (5th)	Emily Watson	Jacqueline du Pré	Hilary and Jackie

=== 2000s ===
Year	Actress	Character	Film
2000 (6th)
2000 (6th)	Hilary Swank	Brandon Teena	Boys Don't Cry
2000 (6th)	Annette Bening	Carolyn Burnham	American Beauty
2000 (6th)	Elodie Bouchez	Isa	The Dreamlife of Angels
2000 (6th)	Julianne Moore	Sarah Miles / Mrs. Laura Cheveley	The End of the Affair / An Ideal Husband
2000 (6th)	Sandra Oh	Sandra	Last Night
2000 (6th)	Rebecca Pidgeon	Catherine Winslow	The Winslow Boy
2000 (6th)	Sarah Polley	Ronna Martin / Harper Sloane	Go / Guinevere
2000 (6th)	Franka Potente	Lola	Run Lola Run
2000 (6th)	Reese Witherspoon	Tracy Flick	Election
2001 (7th)
2001 (7th)	Karine Vanasse	Hanna	Set Me Free
2001 (7th)	Bjork	Selma Yeskova	Dancer in the Dark
2001 (7th)	Ellen Burstyn	Sara Goldfarb	Requiem for a Dream
2001 (7th)	Ayesha Dharker	Malli	The Terrorist
2001 (7th)	Laura Linney	Samantha Prescott	You Can Count on Me
2001 (7th)	Michelle Rodriguez	Diana	Girlfight
2001 (7th)	Cecilia Roth	Manuela	All About My Mother
2001 (7th)	Michelle Yeoh	Shu Lien	Crouching Tiger, Hidden Dragon
2002 (8th)
2002 (8th)	Naomi Watts	Betty/Diane	Mulholland Drive
2002 (8th)	Gillian Anderson	Lily Bart	The House of Mirth
2002 (8th)	Maggie Cheung	Mrs. Chan	In the Mood for Love
2002 (8th)	Lena Endre	Marianne	Faithless
2002 (8th)	Franka Potente	Sissi	The Princess and the Warrior
2002 (8th)	Charlotte Rampling	Marie Drillon	Under the Sand
2002 (8th)	Sissy Spacek	Ruth Fowler	In the Bedroom
2002 (8th)	Tilda Swinton	Margaret Hall	The Deep End
2003 (9th)
2003 (9th)	Isabelle Huppert	Erika Kohut	The Piano Teacher
2003 (9th)	Jacqueline Bisset	Frances	The Sleepy Time Gal
2003 (9th)	Emmanuelle Devos	Carla	Read My Lips
2003 (9th)	Maggie Gyllenhaal	Lee Holloway	Secretary
2003 (9th)	Lena Headey	Kaisa	Aberdeen
2003 (9th)	Catherine Keener	Michelle Marks	Lovely & Amazing
2003 (9th)	Julianne Moore	Cathy Whitaker	Far From Heaven
2003 (9th)	Maribel Verdú	Luisa Cortés	Y tu mamá también
2004 (10th)
2004 (10th)	Sarah Polley	Ann	My Life Without Me
2004 (10th)	Oksana Akinshina	Lilja	Lilja 4-Ever
2004 (10th)	Keisha Castle-Hughes	Paikea "Pai" Apirana	Whale Rider
2004 (10th)	Zooey Deschanel	Noel	All the Real Girls
2004 (10th)	Scarlett Johansson	Charlotte	Lost in Translation
2004 (10th)	Frances McDormand	Jane	Laurel Canyon
2004 (10th)	Samantha Morton	Morvern Callar	Morvern Callar
2004 (10th)	Charlotte Rampling	Sarah Morton	Swimming Pool
2005 (11th)
2005 (11th)	Imelda Staunton	Vera Drake	Vera Drake
2005 (11th)	Sinitta Boonyasak	Noi	Last Life in the Universe
2005 (11th)	Toni Colette	Sandy Edwards	Japanese Story
2005 (11th)	Fatoumata Coulibaly	Collé Gallo Ardo Sy	Moolaadé
2005 (11th)	Catalina Sandino Moreno	Maria	Maria Full of Grace
2005 (11th)	Anne Reid	May	The Mother
2005 (11th)	Isabella Rossellini	Lady Helen Port-Huntley	The Saddest Music in the World
2006 (12th)
2006 (12th)	Marilou Berry	Lolita Cassard	Look at Me
2006 (12th)	Emmanuelle Devos	Nora Cotterelle	Kings and Queen
2006 (12th)	Kate Dollenmayer	Marnie	Funny Ha-Ha
2006 (12th)	Ronit Elkabetz	Ruthie	Or (My Treasure)
2006 (12th)	Natalie Press	Mona	My Summer of Love
2007 (13th)
2007 (13th)	Robin Wright	Phoebe	Sorry, Haters
2007 (13th)	Maggie Cheung	Emily Wang	Clean
2007 (13th)	Laura Dern	Nikki Grace / Susan Blue	Inland Empire
2007 (13th)	Shareeka Epps	Drey	Half Nelson
2007 (13th)	Sandra Hüller	Michaela Klinger	Requiem
2007 (13th)	Elliot Page	Hayley Stark	Hard Candy
2008 (14th)
2008 (14th)	Kate Dickie	Jackie	Red Road
2008 (14th)	Julie Christie	Fiona Anderson	Away from Her
2008 (14th)	Mirjana Karanovic	Esma	Grbavica
2008 (14th)	Elliot Page	Juno McGuff	Juno
2008 (14th)	Sarah Polley	Hanna	The Secret Life of Words
2008 (14th)	Parker Posey	Fay Grim	Fay Grim
2009 (15th)
2009 (15th)	Kristin Scott Thomas	Juliette Fontaine	I've Loved You So Long
2009 (15th)	Anamaria Marinca	Otilia	4 Months, 3 Weeks, 2 Days
2009 (15th)	Sally Hawkins	Poppy	Happy-Go-Lucky
2009 (15th)	Lina Leandersson	Eli	Let the Right One In
2009 (15th)	Michelle Williams	Wendy	Wendy and Lucy

=== 2010s ===
Year	Actress	Character	Film
2010 (16th)
2010 (16th)	Gabourey Sidibe	Precious	Precious, Based on the Novel 'Push' by Sapphire
2010 (16th)	Abbie Cornish	Fanny Brawne	Bright Star
2010 (16th)	Nisreen Faour	Muna Farah	Amreeka
2010 (16th)	Charlotte Gainsbourg	Her	Antichrist
2010 (16th)	Yolande Moreau	Seraphine	Séraphine
2010 (16th)	Carey Mulligan	Jenny Mellor	An Education
2010 (16th)	Catalina Saavedra	Racquel	The Maid
2011 (17th)
2011 (17th)	Kim Hye-ja	Mother	Mother
2011 (17th)	Paprika Steen	Thea Barfoed	Applause
2011 (17th)	Katie Jarvis	Mia Williams	Fish Tank
2011 (17th)	Anne Dorval	Chantale Lemming	I Killed My Mother
2011 (17th)	Jennifer Lawrence	Ree	Winter's Bone
2012 (18th)
2012 (18th)	Tracy Wright	Vic	Trigger
2012 (18th)	Bérénice Bejo	Peppy Miller	The Artist
2012 (18th)	Kirsten Dunst	Justine	Melancholia
2012 (18th)	Adepero Oduye	Alike	Pariah
2012 (18th)	Elizabeth Olson	Martha	Martha Marcy May Marlene
2012 (18th)	Jeong-hie Yun	Mija	Poetry
2013 (19th)
2013 (19th)	Olivia Colman	Hannah	Tyrannosaur
2013 (19th)	Marion Cotillard	Stéphanie	Rust and Bone
2013 (19th)	Helen Hunt	Cheryl	The Sessions
2013 (19th)	Aubrey Plaza	Darius	Safety Not Guaranteed
2013 (19th)	Quvenzhané Wallis	Hushpuppy	Beasts of the Southern Wild
2014 (20th)
2014 (20th)	Brie Larson	Grace	Short Term 12
2014 (20th)	Greta Gerwig	Frances Halliday	Frances Ha
2014 (20th)	Danai Gurira	Adenike Balogun	Mother of George
2014 (20th)	Rachel Mwanza	Komona	War Witch
2014 (20th)	Barbara Sukowa	Hannah Arendt	Hannah Arendt
2014 (20th)	Shailene Woodley	Aimee	The Spectacular Now
2015 (21st)
2015 (21st)	Anne Dorval	Diane 'Die' Després	Mommy
2015 (21st)	Patricia Arquette	Mom	Boyhood
2015 (21st)	Robin Wright	Robin Wright	The Congress
2015 (21st)	Paulina Garcia	Gloria	Gloria
2015 (21st)	Agata Trzebuchowska	Anna	Ida
2015 (21st)	Tilda Swinton	Eve	Only Lovers Left Alive
2016 (22nd)
2016 (22nd)	Karidja Touré	Marieme / Vic	Girlhood
2016 (22nd)	Charlotte Rampling	Kate Mercer	45 Years
2016 (22nd)	Saoirse Ronan	Ellis	Brooklyn
2016 (22nd)	Bel Powley	Minnie	The Diary of a Teenage Girl
2016 (22nd)	Ronit Elkabetz	Viviane Amsalem	Gett: The Trial of Viviane Amsalem
2016 (22nd)	Rinko Kikuchi	Kumiko	Kumiko the Treasure Hunter
2016 (22nd)	Nina Hoss	Nelly Lenz	Phoenix
2017 (23rd)
2017 (23rd)	Isabelle Huppert	Michéle	Elle
2017 (23rd)	Annette Bening	Dorothea	20th Century Women
2017 (23rd)	Sonia Braga	Clara	Aquarius
2017 (23rd)	Imajyn Cardinal	Fern	The Saver
2017 (23rd)	Ruth Negga	Mildred Loving	Loving
2017 (23rd)	Zhao Tao	Shen Tao	Mountains May Depart
2018 (24th)
2018 (24th)	Sally Hawkins (TIE)	Elisa Esposito	The Shape of Water
2018 (24th)	Holly Hunter (TIE)	Darcy Baylor	Strange Weather
2018 (24th)	Aubrey Plaza	Ingrid Thorburn	Ingrid Goes West
2018 (24th)	Brooklynn Prince	Moonee	The Florida Project
2018 (24th)	Margot Robbie	Tonya Harding	I, Tonya
2019 (25th)
2019 (25th)	Regina Hall	Lisa	Support the Girls
2019 (25th)	Eva Melander	Tina	Border
2019 (25th)	Emma Thompson	Fiona Maye	The Children Act
2019 (25th)	Joanna Kulig	Zula	Cold War
2019 (25th)	Thomasin McKenzie	Tom	Leave No Trace
2019 (25th)	Helena Howard	Madeline	Madeline's Madeline

=== 2020s ===
Year	Actress	Character	Film
2020 (26th)
2020 (26th)	Halldóra Geirharðsdóttir	Halla / Ása	Woman at War
2020 (26th)	Kristín Þóra Haraldsdóttir	Lára	And Breathe Normally
2020 (26th)	Karen Allen	Nora	Colewell
2020 (26th)	Elisabeth Moss	Becky	Her Smell
2020 (26th)	Tessa Thompson	Ollie	Little Woods
2020 (26th)	Jessie Buckley	Rose-Lynn	Wild Rose
2021 (27th)
2021 (27th)	Sidney Flanagan	Autumn	Never Rarely Sometimes Always
2021 (27th)	Tsai Chin	Grandma	Lucky Grandma
2021 (27th)	Adele Haenel	Héloïse	Portrait of a Lady on Fire
2021 (27th)	Aubrey Plaza	Allison	Black Bear
2021 (27th)	Eliza Scanlen	Milla	Babyteeth
2021 (27th)	Evan Rachel Wood	Old Dolio	Kajillionaire
2022 (28th)
2022 (28th)	Olivia Colman	Leda	The Lost Daughter
2022 (28th)	Paula Beer	Undine Wisbeau	Undine
2022 (28th)	Jasna Đuričić	Aida	Quo Vadis, Aida?
2022 (28th)	Alana Haim	Alana	Licorice Pizza
2022 (28th)	Kiawentiio	Beans	Beans
2022 (28th)	Magdalena Kolesnik	Sylwia Zajac	Sweat
2023 (29th)
2023 (29th)	Dale Dickey	Faye	A Love Song
2023 (29th)	Alyssa Chia	Lo Pi-wen	The Falls
2023 (29th)	Adèle Exarchopoulos	Cassandre Wassels	Zero Fucks Given
2023 (29th)	Amber Midthunder	Albee	The Wheel
2023 (29th)	Andrea Riseborough	Leslie	To Leslie
2023 (29th)	Claire Rushbrook	Ava	Ali & Ava
2024 (30th)
2024 (30th)	Lily Gladstone	Tana	The Unknown Country
2024 (30th)	Greta Lee	Nora	Past Lives
2024 (30th)	Alma Pöysti	Ansa Grönholm	Fallen Leaves
2024 (30th)	Catalina Saavedra	Señora Vero	Rotting in the Sun
2024 (30th)	Joanna Scanlan	Mary	After Love
2024 (30th)	Kristine Kujath Thorp	Signe	Sick of Myself

== Multiple awards and nominations ==
Actors who have been nominated multiple times

Awards	Nominations	Recipient
2	2	Isabelle Huppert
2	2	Olivia Colman
1	4	Sarah Polley
1	2	Anne Dorval
1	2	Frances McDormand
1	2	Judy Davis
1	2	Robin Wright
1	2	Sally Hawkins
0	4	Julianne Moore
0	3	Aubrey Plaza
0	3	Charlotte Rampling
0	3	Emma Thompson
0	2	Annette Bening
0	2	Catherine Keener
0	2	Elliot Page
0	2	Emily Watson
0	2	Emmanuelle Devos
0	2	Franka Potente
0	2	Helen Hunt
0	2	Maggie Cheung
0	2	Ronit Elkabetz
0	2	Tilda Swinton
