= Beeswax (film) =

2009 film by Andrew Bujalski

- Promotional film poster
- Directed by: Andrew Bujalski
- Written by: Andrew Bujalski
- Produced by: Dia Sokol; Ethan Vogt
- Starring: Tilly Hatcher; Maggie Hatcher; Alex Karpovsky
- Cinematography: Matthias Grunsky
- Edited by: Andrew Bujalski
- Distributed by: The Cinema Guild
- Release date: August 7, 2009
- Running time: 100 minutes
- Country: United States
- Language: English
- Box office: $46,590

Beeswax is a 2009 American mumblecore film written and directed by Andrew Bujalski. The film examines a few days in the life of twins, played by real-life sisters Tilly and Maggie Hatcher.

It premiered at the Berlin International Film Festival and had a limited theatrical release in the United States on August 7, 2009.

== Cast ==
- Tilly Hatcher as Jeannie
- Maggie Hatcher as Lauren
- Anne Dodge as Amanda
- Alex Karpovsky as Merrill
- Katy O'Connor as Corinne
- David Zellner as Scott

== Critical response ==
The film opened to positive reviews. Review aggregate Rotten Tomatoes reports that 75% of 48 critics gave the film a positive review, with an average score of 6.7/10. The site's critical consensus reads: "Andrew Bujalski's third effort will test the patience of some filmgoers, but it represents a warm, funny, and honest introduction to the mumblecore movement." Review aggregator Metacritic assigned the film a weighted average score of 70 (out of 100) based on 14 reviews from mainstream critics, considered to be "generally favorable" reviews.

== Home media ==
Beeswax was released on DVD by The Cinema Guild on April 6, 2010. In 2020, The Cinema Guild released a remastered version of the film with a new cover design, a booklet of essays by Christopher Terhechte and Kevin Coorigan, and bonus features including a 10 Years Later Q&A with the cast and crew.
