= Results (film) =

- Film poster
- Directed by: Andrew Bujalski
- Written by: Andrew Bujalski
- Produced by: Sam Slater; Paul Bernon; Houston King
- Starring: Guy Pearce; Cobie Smulders; Kevin Corrigan; Giovanni Ribisi; Anthony Michael Hall; Brooklyn Decker; Constance Zimmer
- Cinematography: Matthias Grunsky
- Edited by: Robin Schwartz
- Music by: Justin Rice
- Production companies: Burn Later Productions; Houston King Productions
- Distributed by: Magnolia Pictures
- Release dates: January 27, 2015 (Sundance Film Festival); May 29, 2015 (United States)
- Running time: 105 minutes
- Country: United States
- Language: English
- Box office: $104,507

Results is a 2015 indie romantic comedy film written and directed by Andrew Bujalski. The film stars Guy Pearce, Cobie Smulders, Kevin Corrigan, Giovanni Ribisi, Brooklyn Decker, Anthony Michael Hall, and Constance Zimmer.

Ahead of its Sundance Film Festival Premiere, Results was acquired by Magnolia Pictures. The film had its premiere at the 2015 Sundance Film Festival on January 27, 2015. The film was released in a limited release and through video on demand on May 29, 2015.

== Plot ==
Danny, a wealthy, recently divorced man, walks into the Power 4 Life gym in Austin on a whim and consults with Trevor, the owner, about a fitness regime. Trevor reluctantly assigns Kat, one of his personal trainers, to work with Danny. Kat is liked by her clients but can be temperamental; her relationship with Trevor is complicated by their sexual history. Kat meets with Danny at his mansion, where he lives a life of boredom and depression.

Danny quickly finds himself attracted to Kat. He invites Kat to smoke marijuana with him, revealing that his wealth is inherited from his recently deceased estranged mother, who married a wealthy man Danny never met. At Kat's instigation the two have sex, but not before Kat orders, "No disrobing!" At their next session, Danny surprises her with a romantic dinner, causing Kat to angrily reject him. Danny stops payment to Power 4 Life, leading Trevor to physically confront him at his house. He encourages Danny not to quit on his personal improvement goals, and the two make amends.

Trevor brings Danny on as an investor in a new location for Power 4 Life. An encounter with a client causes Kat to rethink her life, leading her to quit her trainer job, but her attempt at rekindling her relationship with Trevor is rebuffed. Trevor begins training Danny himself at a different gym, and the two become friends. Trevor reveals his past relationship with Kat to Danny, admitting that he was in love with her. Danny reacts poorly but encourages him to pursue the relationship, selling Kat his share in Power 4 Life for $150 in order to reconnect the two. Trevor meets with his fitness idol Grigory to invite him to lead a seminar at the new Power 4 Life, but finds that their philosophies are incompatible. Kat arrives unexpectedly, and the two bicker over their business and their failed relationship, unexpectedly winning over Grigory and his wife Erin.

Danny talks to Kat and Trevor, who encourage him not to give up on love. Kat and Trevor have sex, but Kat remains cagey about the status of their relationship. Trevor admits he loves her, which Kat reciprocates. The two kiss, lamenting their prospects but excited about their future. At Kat's suggestion, Danny throws a party for his friends and women from a local sorority.

== Cast ==
- Guy Pearce as Trevor
- Cobie Smulders as Kat
- Kevin Corrigan as Danny
- Giovanni Ribisi as Paul
- Brooklyn Decker as Erin
- Anthony Michael Hall as Grigory
- Constance Zimmer as Mandy
- Tishuan Scott as Lorenzo
- Zoe Graham as Talley
- David Bernon as Ivan
- Elizabeth Berridge as Christine
- Katie Folger as Riley
- Elizabeth McQueen as Herself (cameo)
- Paul Qui as Himself (cameo)
- Zack Carlson as Himself (cameo)

== Production ==
Guy Pearce and Cobie Smulders were announced as the main duo and joined already cast Kevin Corrigan, Constance Zimmer, Giovanni Ribisi, Brooklyn Decker, and Anthony Michael Hall.

Filming took place in Austin, Texas in the summer of 2014.

== Release ==
Results was announced in the U.S. Dramatic Competition category of the 2015 Sundance Film Festival and debuted at the Festival on January 27, 2015. The film was screened at many other festivals including closing the Capital City Film Festival, South by Southwest, Cleveland International Film Festival, and Dallas International Film Festival. Results was released in a limited release and through video on demand on May 29, 2015.

== Reception ==
Review aggregator Rotten Tomatoes gives the film an 85% approval rating, based on reviews from 97 critics, with an average rating of 6.6/10. The site's consensus states: "Results moves stubbornly at its own deliberate pace, but the well-chosen cast — and writer-director Andrew Bujalski's insightful observations — offer rich rewards for patient viewers." Metacritic gives the film a score of 73 out of 100 based on reviews from 29 critics, indicating "generally favorable reviews".

Richard Lawson of Vanity Fair believed that "Pearce, Smulders, and Corrigan give fluid, easygoing performances, never condescending to their characters no matter how pitiful they might be. Smulders is especially engaging—she makes Kat prickly and short-tempered but never entirely unlikable". Scott Foundas of Variety said, "Bujalski wrote Results with specific actors in mind, and the roles fit them as snugly as spandex leotards". Sarah Salovaara of the Filmmaker Magazine said that "Beyond modesty, Bujalski and his longtime d.p. Matthias Grunsky demonstrate a great handle on the comic potential of framing."

Alexander Lowe gave Results 3 out of 5 stars and said, "[W]hile not a perfect film by any means, the plot is light and enjoyable, the performances are tight and the conclusion is satisfying. All of that is far more than can be said for the vast majority of romantic comedies in recent years, so at the very least, Results should be commended for that."
