= A Night Without Armor =

A Night Without Armor may refer to:

- A Night Without Armor (book), a 1998 book of poetry by Jewel
- A Night Without Armor (film), a 2017 American film
