= There There (film) =

2022 film by Andrew Bujalski

- Poster
- Directed by: Andrew Bujalski
- Written by: Andrew Bujalski
- Produced by: Houston King; Dia Sokol Savage; Sam Bisbee
- Starring: Jason Schwartzman; Lili Taylor; Lennie James; Molly Gordon; Annie La Ganga; Avi Nash
- Cinematography: Matthias Grunsky
- Edited by: Andrew Bujalski
- Music by: Jon Natchez
- Distributed by: Magnolia Pictures
- Release date: November 18, 2022
- Running time: 93 minutes 94 minutes
- Country: United States
- Language: English

There There is a 2022 American romantic comedy film written and directed by Andrew Bujalski and starring Jason Schwartzman, Lili Taylor, Lennie James, Molly Gordon, Annie La Ganga and Avi Nash.

== Plot ==
A series of short scenes featuring two characters at a time, playing with our perceptions and expectations in a disorienting reality not far removed from our own. A lover's doubt in the harsh light of morning leads to a chain of awkward intimacies—confidants, disruptors, peacemakers, and instigators—each seeking a measure of faith rewarded.

== Cast ==
- Jason Schwartzman as Lawyer
- Lili Taylor as One Night Stand
- Annie LaGanga as AA Sponsor
- Molly Gordon as English Teacher
- Lennie James as Restaurant Owner
- Avi Nash as CEO
- Roy Nathanson as Ghost Father
- Jon Natchez as Musician

== Production ==
=== Cinematography ===
The film was shot remotely during the COVID-19 pandemic using iPhone 12 Pro Max smartphones, with director Andrew Bujalski and cinematographer Matthias Grunsky never physically present on set. Each scene was filmed with actors in separate locations, often thousands of miles apart and weeks or months apart in time, with the two performers never meeting in person. While Bujalski directed the actors from his home in Texas, cinematographer Grunsky instructed the minimal on-location crew via Zoom from Munich, Germany, controlling exposure, focus, and color temperature through the Filmic Pro app.

The production method reflected the film's thematic concerns with isolation and mediated communication. Grunsky embraced the iPhone's technical characteristics—including its deep depth of field, compression artifacts, and noise in low light—as part of the film's aesthetic language rather than attempting to hide the limitations of smartphone cinematography.

This marked the seventh collaboration between Bujalski and Grunsky, continuing their pattern of experimental approaches to camera technology following Computer Chess (2013), which was shot on 1970s video tube cameras.

== Release ==
In June 2022, it was announced that Magnolia Pictures acquired U.S. distribution rights to the film, which premiered at the 2022 Tribeca Film Festival. The film was then released in theaters and on demand on November 18, 2022.

== Reception ==
On the review aggregator website Rotten Tomatoes, 46% of 28 critics' reviews are positive, with an average rating of 5.3/10. The website's consensus reads, "There There's unique high concept might be noteworthy, but it isn't strong enough to carry this series of baggy vignettes." Metacritic, which uses a weighted average, assigned the film a score of 57 out of 100, based on 11 critics, indicating "mixed or average" reviews.

Brett Buckalew of The A.V. Club graded the film a C+. Sheila O'Malley of RogerEbert.com awarded the film two stars out of four. David Ehrlich of IndieWire graded the film a B−. Chris Barsanti of Slant Magazine awarded the film two and a half stars out of four. John DeFore of The Hollywood Reporter gave the film a negative review and wrote as the bottom line: "A largely unsuccessful experiment about struggling to connect."
