= Dollenmayer =

Dollenmayer may refer to:

- Kate Dollenmayer, an American actor and film archivist
- David Dollenmayer, an American academic professor of German
