= There, There =

There, There or There There may refer to:

- There There (film), a 2022 American romantic comedy film
- There, There (film), a 2024 Canadian drama film
- "There There", a 2003 song by Radiohead
- "There, There", a 2013 song by the Wonder Years from The Greatest Generation
- There There (novel), a 2018 book by Tommy Orange
- There, There, a children's book by Tim Beiser

== See also ==
- "There, There, My Dear", a 1980 song by Dexys Midnight Runners from Searching for the Young Soul Rebels
