= Justin Rice =

American musician and actor

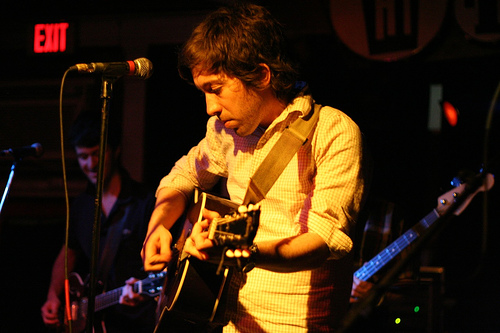
- Justin Rice performing with Bishop Allen. HiTone Cafe, Memphis, TN. 22 March 2007.

Background information
- Born: November 1, 1976 (age 49)
- Genres: Indie folk
- Occupation: Actor/Musician
- Instruments: Vocals, Acoustic guitar
- Years active: 2001–present
- Website: Official website

Justin Rice is an American musician and actor.

== Music career ==
Since 2001, he has played guitar for indie rock band Bishop Allen. He also co-wrote the music for the documentary The Bully Project with band-mate Christian Rudder., and the music for the independent film Mutual Friends with David Lerner.

Justin Rice formed a second band, The Last Names, in 2011 with his wife Darbie Nowatka (also from Bishop Allen); they released a free cover song every week through 2012 in advance of a full-length album.

== Movie career ==
Rice has also had roles in two Andrew Bujalski films; 2002's Funny Ha Ha and 2006's Mutual Appreciation. He also stars in the 2007 independent film Let Them Chirp Awhile, directed by Jonathan Blitstein. Rice has a role in Joe Swanberg's 2009 feature film Alexander the Last, Bob Byington independent micro-budget feature Harmony and Me (2009) and Michael Harring's The Mountain, the River and the Road.

With Randy Bell, Rice co-directed a documentary about Bob Dylan called Look Back, Don't Look Back. He is also in the 2008 film Nick and Norah's Infinite Playlist as himself. He stars also alongside Paige Stark in the Ti West web series, Dead & Lonely.

== Personal life ==
Rice studied at Harvard University. He and Darbie Nowatka married on September 12, 2009.
