= 2005 National Society of Film Critics Awards =

Annual US film awards ceremony

40th NSFC Awards

January 7, 2006

Best Film:
Capote

The 40th National Society of Film Critics Awards, given on 7 January 2006, honored the best in film for 2005.

== Winners ==
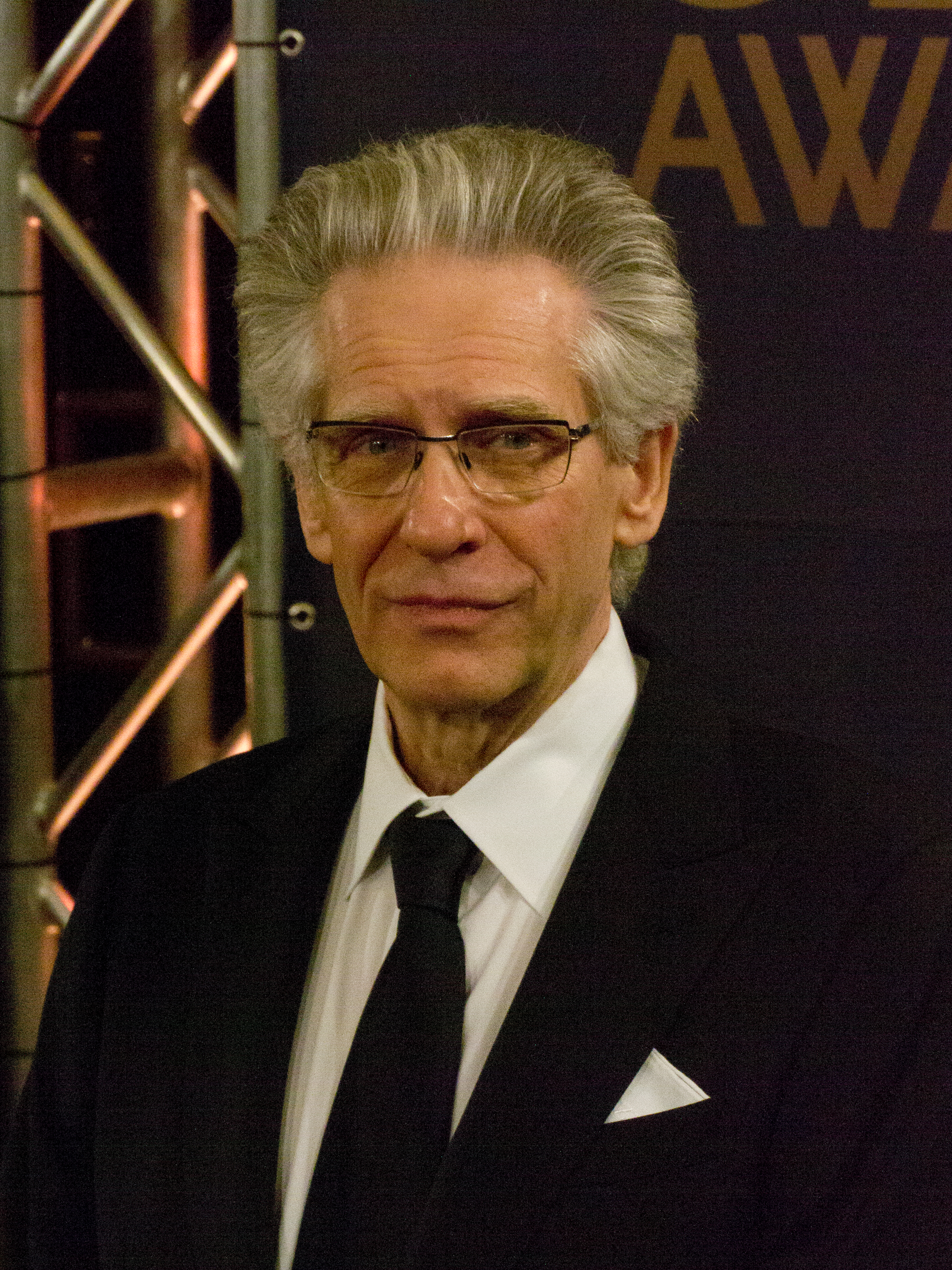
David Cronenberg, Best Director winner

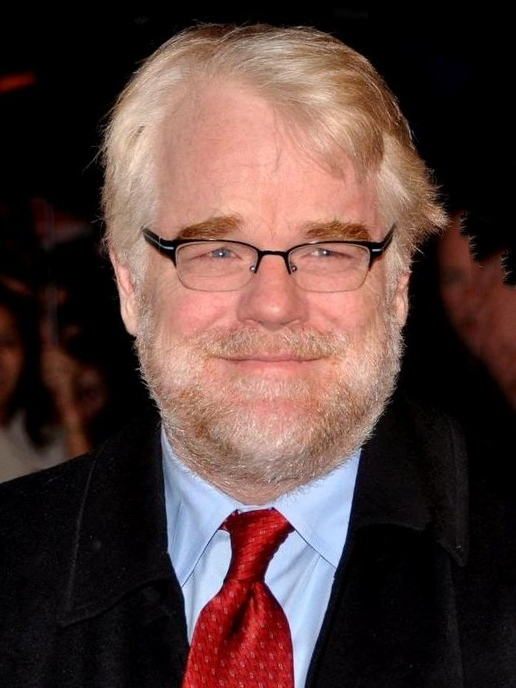
Philip Seymour Hoffman, Best Actor winner

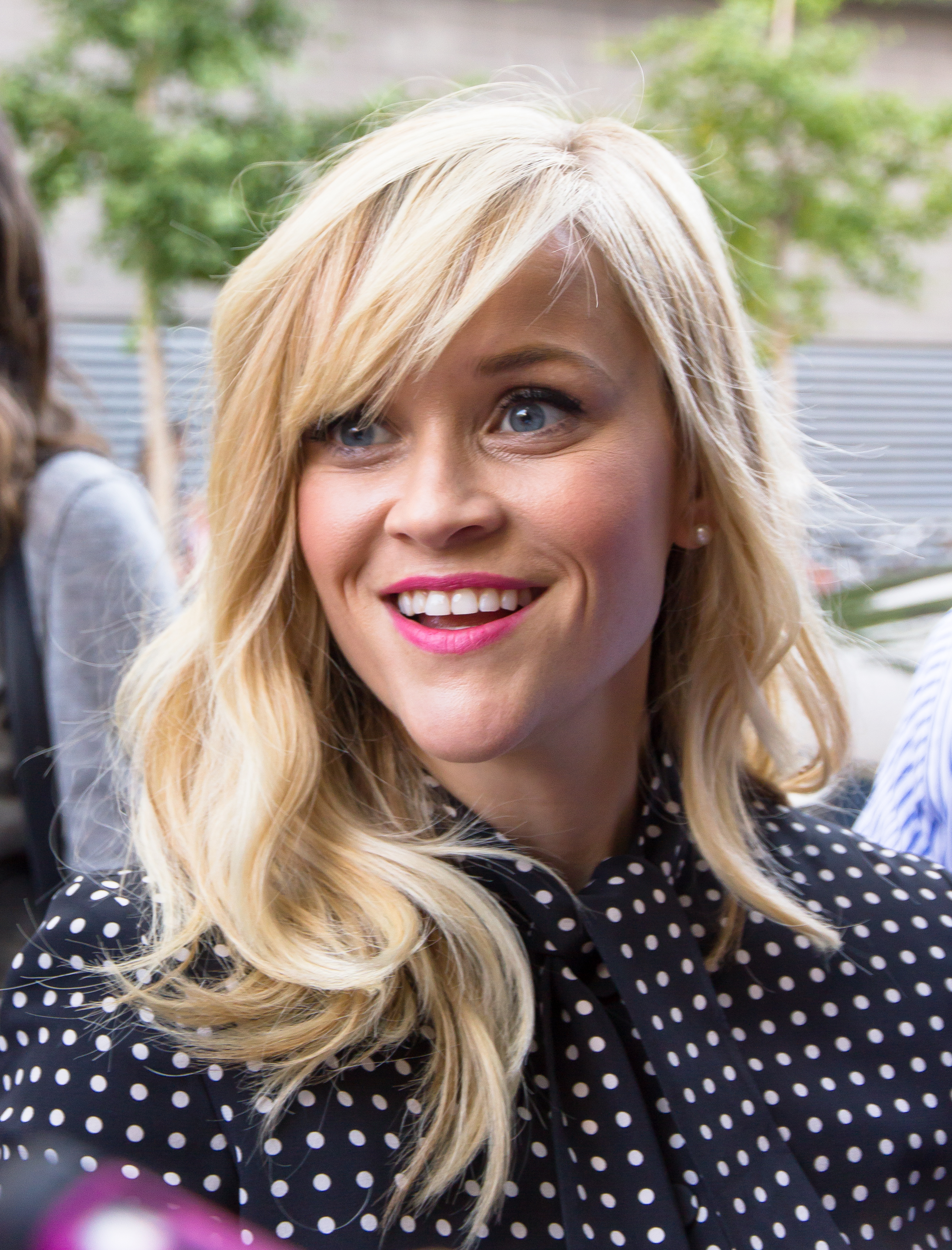
Reese Witherspoon, Best Actress winner

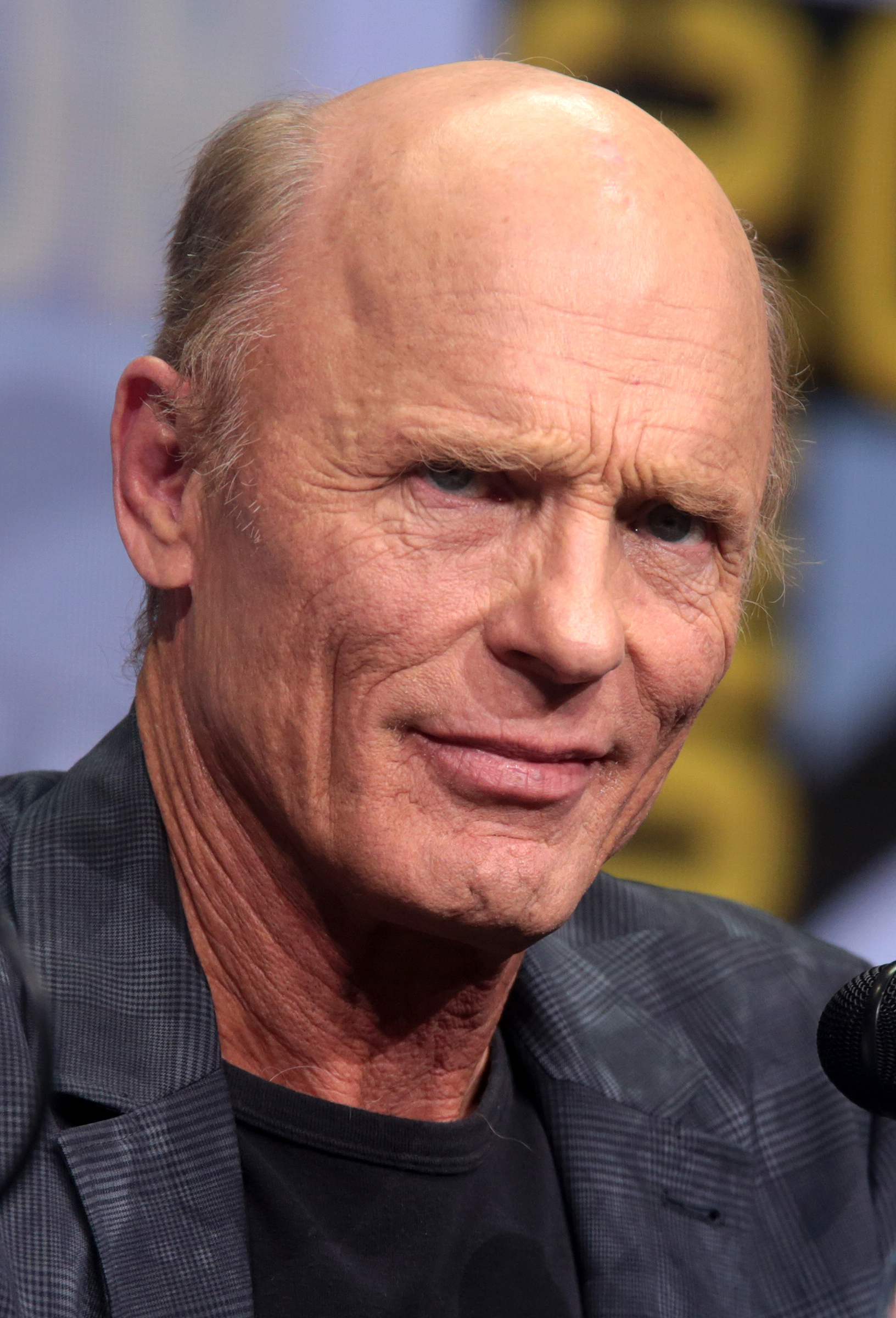
Ed Harris, Best Supporting Actor winner

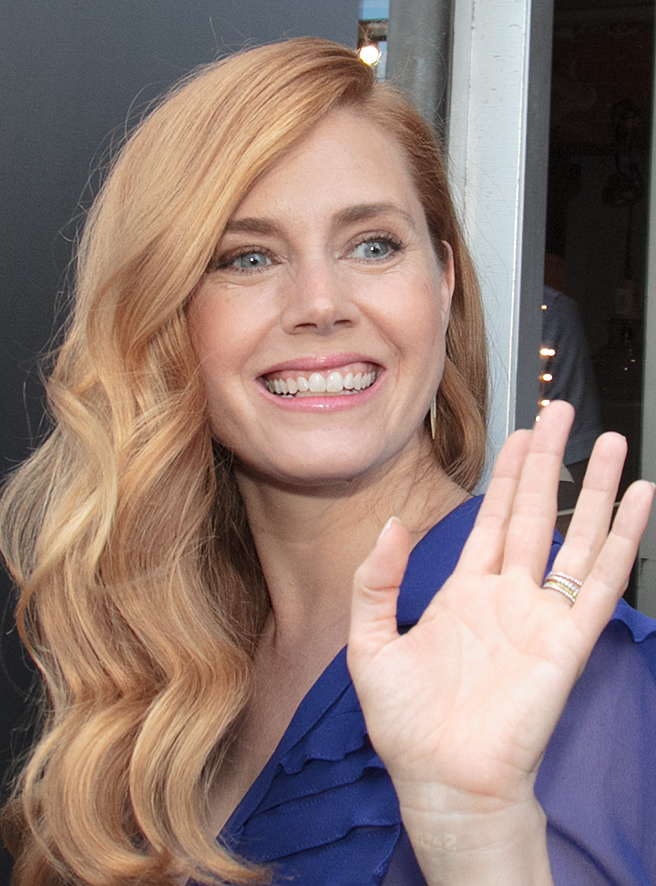
Amy Adams, Best Supporting Actress winner

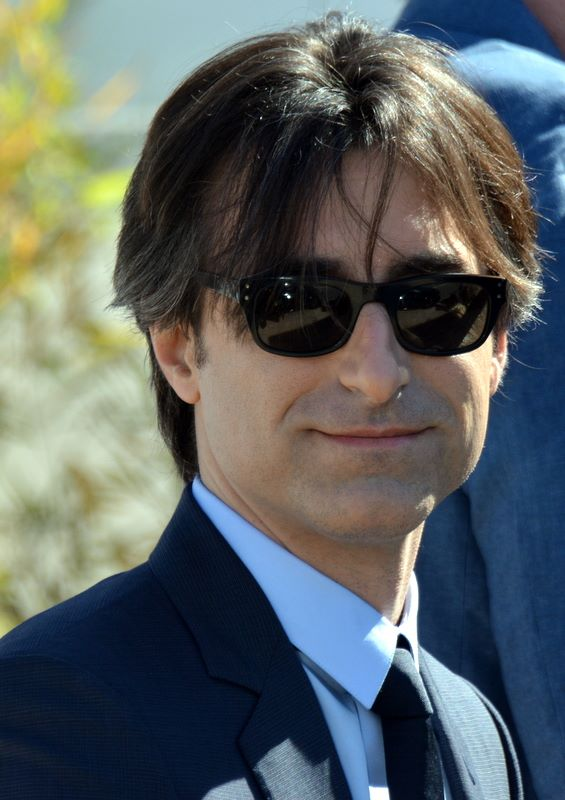
Noah Baumbach, Best Screenplay winner

=== Best Picture ===
1. Capote (12)
2. A History of Violence (11)
3. 2046

=== Best Director ===
1. David Cronenberg – A History of Violence (32)
2. Wong Kar-wai – 2046 (26)
3. Bennett Miller – Capote (23)

=== Best Actor ===
1. Philip Seymour Hoffman – Capote (68)
2. Jeff Daniels – The Squid and the Whale (41)
3. Heath Ledger – Brokeback Mountain (40)

=== Best Actress ===
1. Reese Witherspoon – Walk the Line (37)
2. Keira Knightley – Pride & Prejudice (27)
3. Kate Dollenmayer – Funny Ha Ha (18)
3. Vera Farmiga – Down to the Bone (18)

=== Best Supporting Actor ===
1. Ed Harris – A History of Violence (27)
2. Mathieu Amalric – Munich (22)
2. Frank Langella – Good Night, and Good Luck. (22)

=== Best Supporting Actress ===
1. Amy Adams – Junebug (33)
2. Zhang Ziyi – 2046 (28)
3. Catherine Keener – The 40-Year-Old Virgin, The Ballad of Jack and Rose, Capote, and The Interpreter (22)

=== Best Screenplay ===
1. Noah Baumbach – The Squid and the Whale (37)
2. Dan Futterman – Capote (33)
3. Tony Kushner and Eric Roth – Munich (14)

=== Best Cinematography ===
1. Christopher Doyle, Kwan Pun Leung, and Lai Yiu-fai – 2046 (50)
2. Robert Elswit – Good Night, and Good Luck. (16)
3. Emmanuel Lubezki – The New World (11)

=== Best Foreign Language Film ===
1. Head-On (Gegen die Wand) (26)
2. 2046 (23)
3. Caché (18)

=== Best Non-Fiction Film ===
1. Grizzly Man (60)
2. Darwin's Nightmare (27)
3. Ballets Russes (19)

=== Experimental Awards ===
1. Symbiopsychotaxiplasm: Take One (1968) and Symbiopsychotaxiplasm: Take 2 1/2 (2005), William Greaves' remarkable investigation into the nature of the acting process and power relationships on a movie set.
2. 13 Lakes, Ten Skies, and 27 Years Later, the three 2005 productions of James Benning. Few have done more over the last thirty years to expand the sensory and temporal boundaries of moving pictures.

=== Film Heritage Award ===
- Unseen Cinema, the 7-disc DVD box set collection of pre-1942 American avant-garde cinema assembled by Anthology Film Archives and Bruce Posner—a massive and unprecedented undertaking made in concert with 60 other film archives and preservation organizations across the globe.

=== Special Citation ===
- The NSFC commends and congratulates our colleagues Kevin Thomas for his 44-year tenure as a movie critic at the Los Angeles Times, for his tireless championing in the heart of the world's movie capital of the power and beauty of independent, experimental and foreign film, for his long and important service to moviegoers around the industry, the country and the world.
