= 2018 New York Film Critics Circle Awards =

84th New York Film Critics Circle Awards

84th NYFCC Awards
- Date: November 29, 2018

Highlights
- Best Picture: Roma
- Best Director: Alfonso Cuarón

The 84th New York Film Critics Circle Awards, honoring the best in film for 2018, were announced on November 29, 2018.

== Winners ==
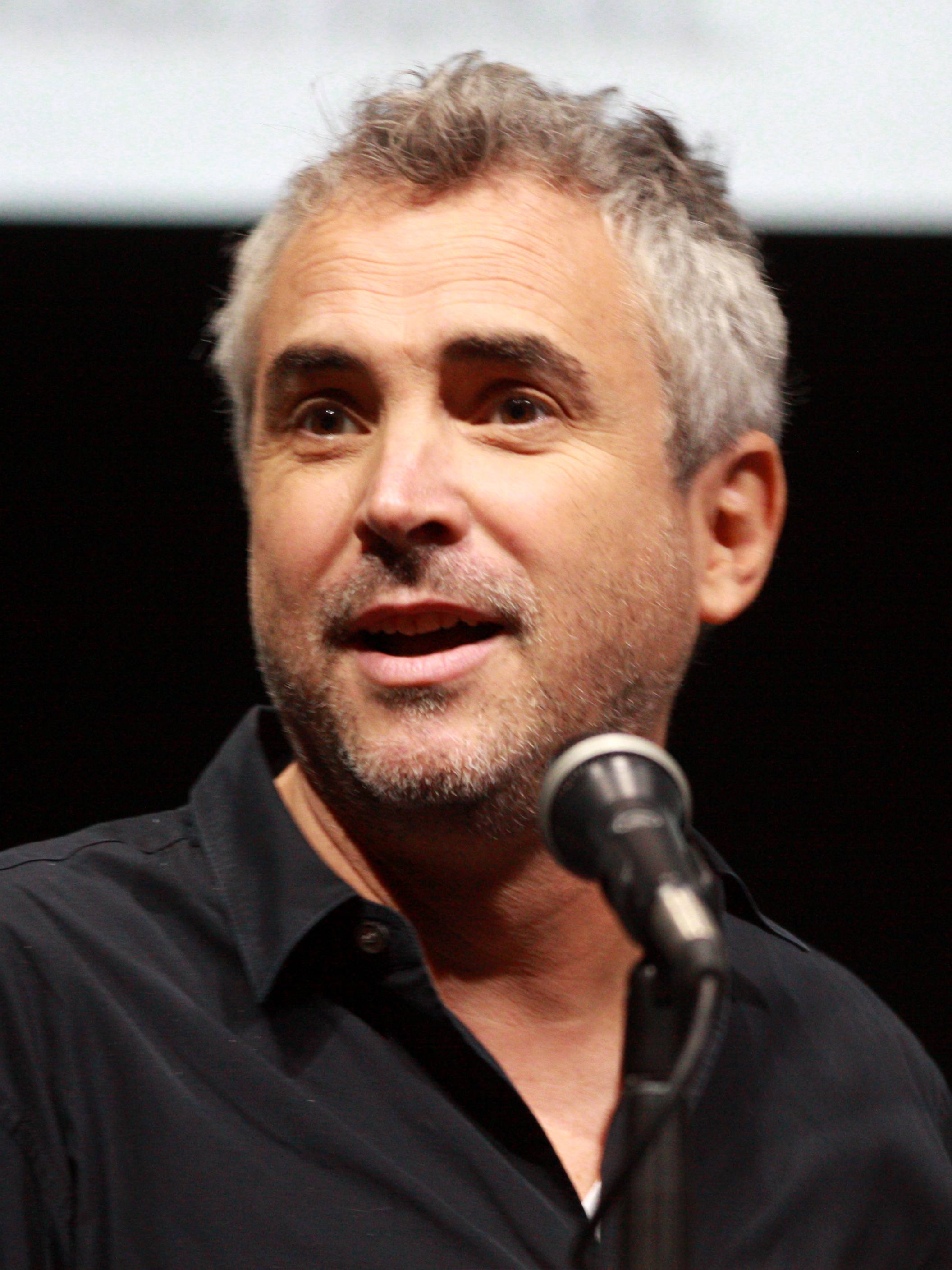
Alfonso Cuarón won Best Director

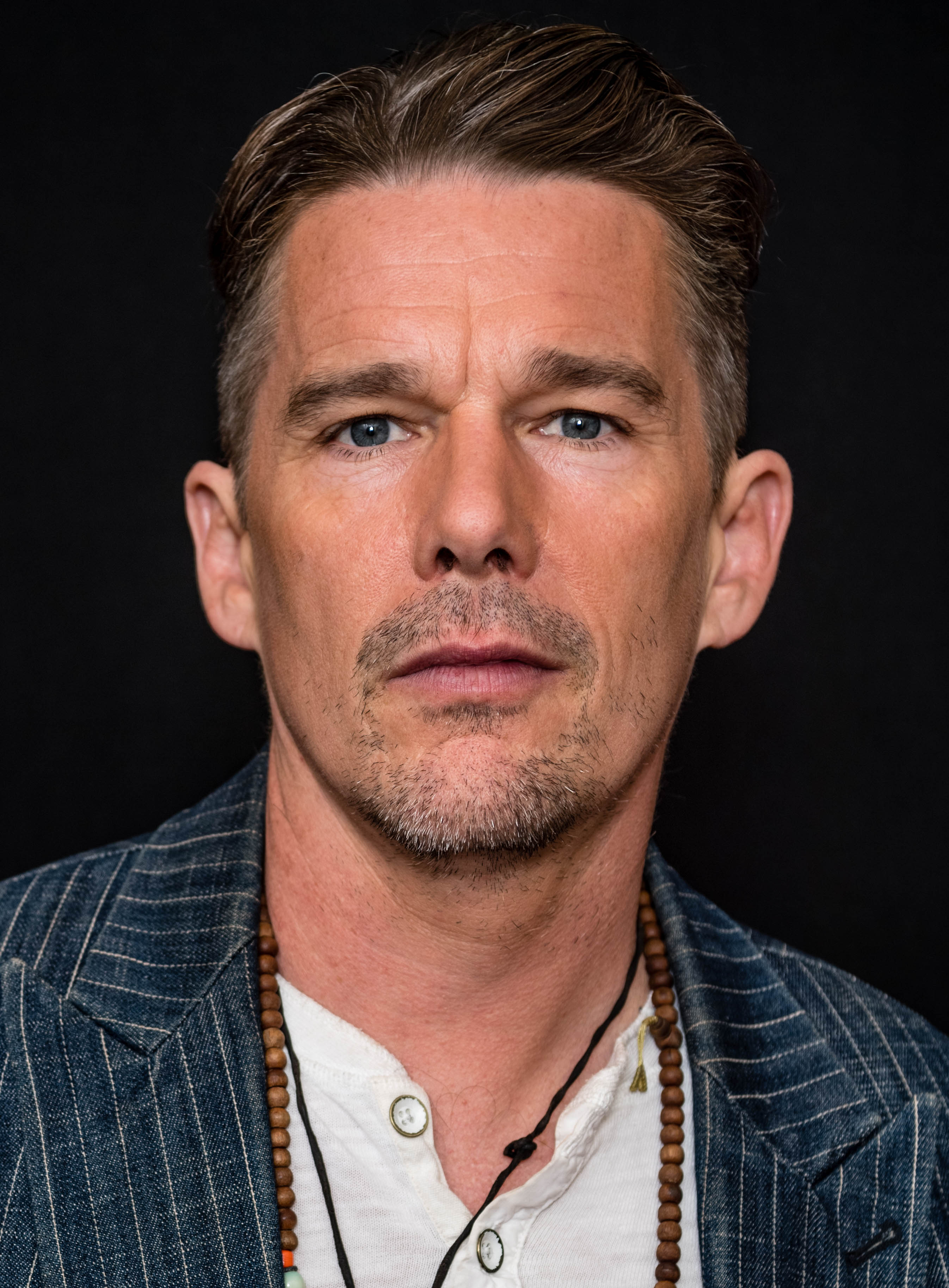
Ethan Hawke won Best Actor

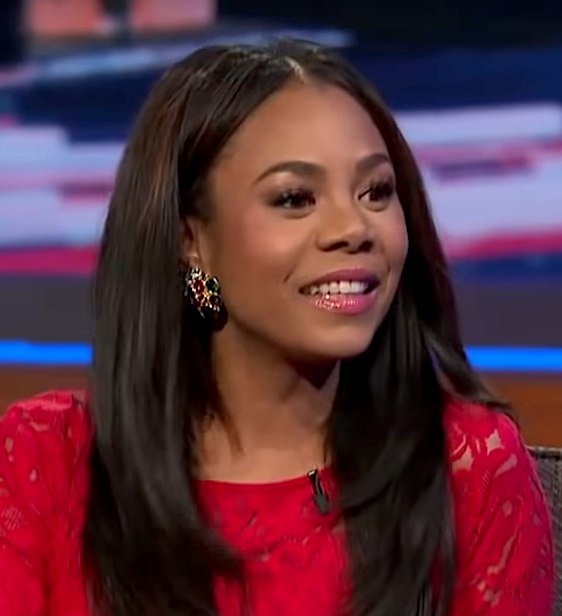
Regina Hall won Best Actress

- Best Film
  - Roma
- Best Director
  - Alfonso Cuarón – Roma
- Best Actor
  - Ethan Hawke – First Reformed
- Best Actress
  - Regina Hall – Support the Girls
- Best Supporting Actor
  - Richard E. Grant – Can You Ever Forgive Me?
- Best Supporting Actress
  - Regina King – If Beale Street Could Talk
- Best Screenplay
  - Paul Schrader – First Reformed
- Best Animated Film
  - Spider-Man: Into the Spider-Verse
- Best Cinematography
  - Alfonso Cuarón – Roma
- Best Non-Fiction Film
  - Minding the Gap
- Best Foreign Language Film
  - Cold War • Poland
- Best First Film
  - Bo Burnham – Eighth Grade
- Special Award
  - David Schwartz
  - Pioneers: First Women Filmmakers
