= Asylum Seekers (film) =

2009 film by Rania Ajami

- Film poster
- Directed by: Rania Ajami
- Written by: Rania Ajami; Jake Pilikian
- Produced by: Molly Conners; Alex Twersky
- Starring: Pepper Binkley; Daniel Irizarry; Bill Dawes; Judith Hawking; Stella Maeve; Camille O'Sullivan; Lee Wilkof
- Cinematography: Lyn Moncrief
- Edited by: Susan Graef
- Music by: David Majzlin
- Production companies: Cipher Productions; SpaceTime Films; The Group Entertainment
- Distributed by: Breaking Glass Pictures
- Release date: June 13, 2009 (CineVegas)
- Running time: 89 minutes
- Country: United States
- Language: English
- Budget: $1.5 million

Asylum Seekers is a 2009 American black comedy film written and directed by Rania Ajami. The film stars Pepper Binkley and Daniel Irizarry as two of the six social outcast protagonists who attempt to commit themselves to an insane asylum to spice up their lives. Bill Dawes, Judith Hawking, Stella Maeve, Camille O'Sullivan, and Lee Wilkof also star in the film.

In its spring 2008 issue, the independent film magazine Filmmaker reported that Asylum Seekers was one of the first independent feature films to be completed on Red Digital Cinema's Red One camera.

The global distribution sales rights for Asylum Seekers were acquired by Shoreline Entertainment. The film was introduced to buyers at the 2009 European Film Market before its world premiere later that year at CineVegas. Asylum Seekers was released in North America on DVD/VOD by Breaking Glass Pictures under its Vicious Circle Films label.

== Plot ==
Six introverted individuals, bored with their lives and trying to escape their daily routine, attempt to find a radical solution to their boredom by getting themselves admitted into a psychiatric hospital. Among these individuals are Maud, a bored trophy wife who feels trapped in a loveless marriage; Antoine, a sex-obsessed virgin; Alice, a woman whose only enjoyment comes from computers; Miranda, a paranoid exhibitionist whose inhibitions make her dislike being the center of attention; Paul, a fanatical right-wing conspiracy theorist; and Alan, an androgynous rapper.

Upon arriving at the asylum, the six individuals are informed that there is only room for one person in the hospital. Nurse Milly informs the individuals that they must now compete for the only remaining spot in the asylum. The nurse proceeds to administer tests and contests, and whoever she deems the craziest and most insane will be declared the winner and committed to the institution. The competition and everything in the institution are always watched over and supervised by an unseen character known only as "The Beard."

== Cast ==
- Pepper Binkley as Maud
- Daniel Irizarry as Antoine Raby
- Bill Dawes as Alan
- Stella Maeve as Alice
- Camille O'Sullivan as Miranda
- Lee Wilkof as Paul
- Judith Hawking as Nurse Milly

== Production ==
In an interview with indieWire, director Rania Ajami stated that the idea for the film came from a recurring dream that her brother had about a "giant beard" that was trying to devour him. From the premise of her brother's dreams, Ajami created a play titled The Giant Swearing Beard that told the story of six people trying to break into an asylum. About six years later, she was inspired by discussions about political asylum seekers and decided that a film based on the premise of her play would be a suitable metaphor for real-world political issues.

With an estimated budget of $1.5 million, the film's production team made adjustments to stay within the modest budget while also attempting to stay true to the "visual scope of the film" and the perceived "fantasy world."

Asylum Seekers was filmed entirely on Red Digital Cinema's Red One camera, a digital video camera capable of recording video in 12-megapixel resolution directly to flash memory or a hard disk drive. As of August 2008, the Red One was used to film at least 40 feature films, but Asylum Seekers was one of the first independent features to use the camera. The production team opted for the Red One because it offered significant financial savings over a 35 mm film camera while not compromising image quality.

Rania Ajami said the casting process took over a year because she found that the biggest challenge in the production process "was finding good people to work with." The production was then halted for another month before the filming could begin because Ajami had contracted Infectious Mononucleosis — usually referred to as mono — and had to spend a month in bed.

== Release and promotion ==
The global distribution sales rights for Asylum Seekers were acquired by Shoreline Entertainment. The deal, which was announced in August 2008, was negotiated between Shoreline and the film's producer Molly Connors and executive producer Christopher Woodrow.

Asylum Seekers had its world premiere in 2009 at CineVegas, where it screened on June 13 and 14 in Las Vegas, Nevada. During CineVegas, the film's publicist arranged for a wedding to take place on the red carpet immediately before the film's initial showing at the Palms Casino Resort.

The film's director, Rania Ajami, explained the reasoning behind the stunt, claiming that the "two institutions, the institution of marriage and the mental institution in which the majority of the film is set, were sufficient bonding agents." Further, the Red Carpet wedding was a Las Vegas-centric experience; "couples come to Las Vegas to marry, see shows, Elvis impersonators," Ms. Ajami explained. "We stayed true to the festival's locale and created a crazy all-Vegas show for a Vegas festival." The bride and groom were from Houston, Texas and were selected because they were young and self-proclaimed "fun" people, which matched the demographic of the film. The infamous A Little White Wedding Chapel helped select the suitable couple.

== Reception ==
Charles Tatum of eFilmCritic.com awarded Asylum Seekers three stars, calling the film's initial set-up "promising" and declaring that "the possibilities are endless" after watching the opening part of the film. However, Tatum criticized the movie for being too "bizarre" and "exhausting," stating his opinion was that "the surrealism should have been toned down" and concluded by calling the film "even more insane than its characters." He also added that, although the film lacked "strong characterization," the cast deserved praise for a "great job playing characters that are way way out there." Tatum did commend the director for her use of widescreen, "creepy imagery," and compared her work to works of Terry Gilliam and Jean-Pierre Jeunet.

Film critic T.R. Witcher of the Las Vegas Weekly awarded the film two stars. Witcher also applauded the opening sequences of Asylum Seekers for "brimming with ideas" and that it "begins with a promising premise." Ultimately, Witcher criticized the film by concluding that it lacks "storytelling discipline" and that it contains "even less human emotion." Agreeing with Tatum that Asylum Seekers is "surreal," he felt that its "fairly limp" comedy undercuts the suspenseful psychological atmosphere created by the film's surrealism.
