= Ethan Vogt =

American filmmaker, photographer and artist

- Born: July 13, 1974 (age 52); Boston, Massachusetts, United States
- Occupations: Film producer, photographer

Ethan Vogt (born July 13, 1974, in Boston Massachusetts) is an American filmmaker, photographer, visual artist and festival producer.

== Profile ==
He is the son of Eric E. and Susan (née Smith) Vogt and the grandson of Evon Z. Vogt.

Vogt studied photography and filmmaking as an undergraduate at Harvard University where he met the writer/director Andrew Bujalski in an introductory film class. Vogt would later produce Bujalski's feature films, Funny Ha Ha (2003), Mutual Appreciation (2005) and Beeswax (2009). Funny Ha Ha is considered the first "mumblecore" film and was recognized as one of the 10 most culturally, commercially or technologically important, consequential or groundbreaking films of 2000–9" by A.O. Scott, a chief film critic in the New York Times.

In 2005 when studying at NYU, Vogt wrote and directed "Game: On" a commercial for Volvo North America cited as one of the first commercial projects to combine live-action filmmaking with machinima. It was awarded Best Picture and Best Commercial Machinima in the 2005 Machinima Film Festival and recognized for "Distinctive Merit" in the 84th Annual Art Director Club Awards. The short's production process was featured in an article by Clive Thompson in the New York Times Magazine "The Xbox Auteurs", and the book Machinima: Making Animated Movies in 3D Virtual Environments. Vogt 's real-time video sets with live music "Live Projections Volume One" premiered at the Marfa Film Festival in 2010.

On October 2, 2010, Vogt produced Bring to Light a free public nighttime festival of light, sound and projection art in Greenpoint, Brooklyn which was the first Nuit Blanche event in New York City.
