= Matthias Grunsky =

Austrian cinematographer

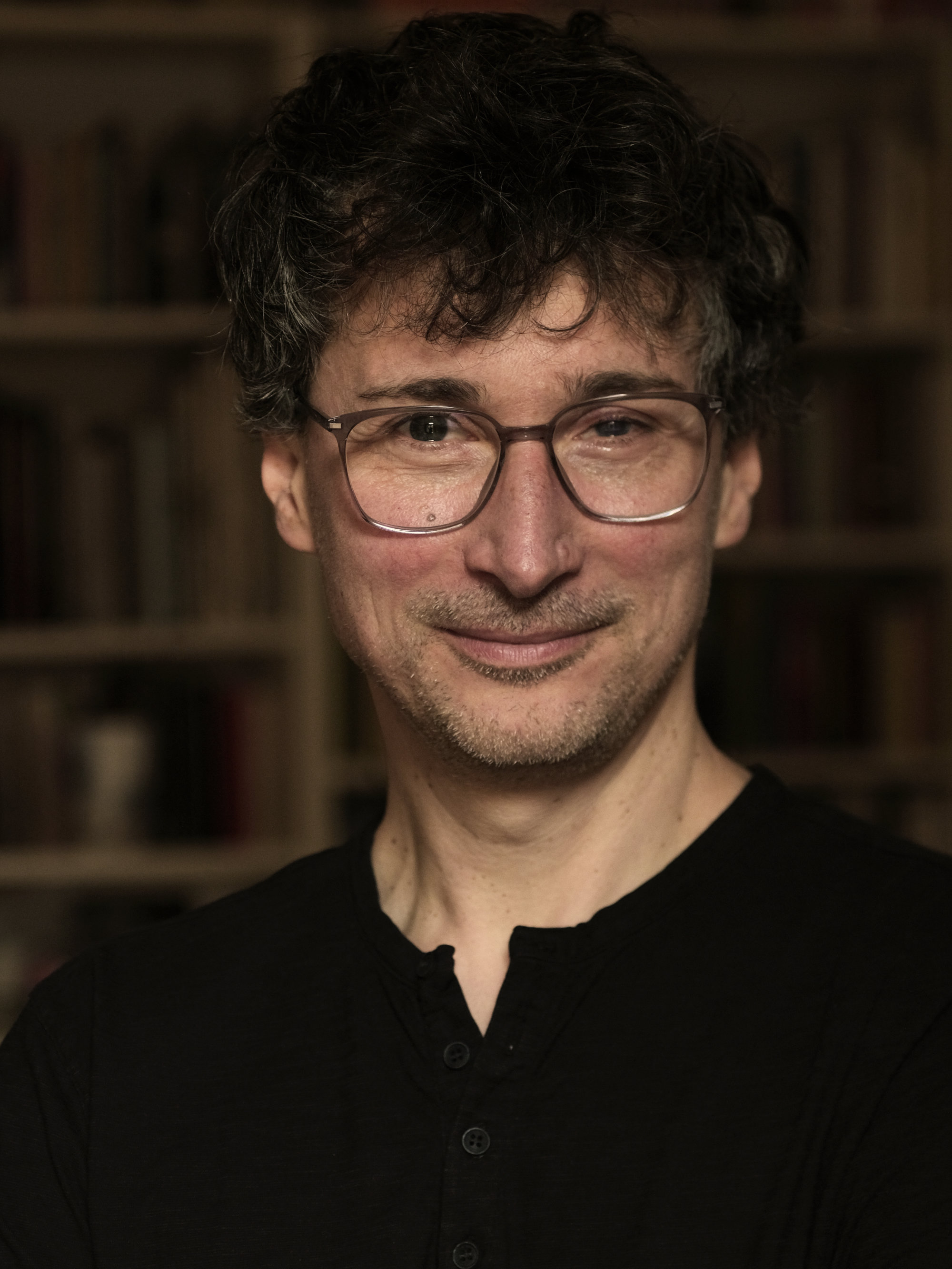
- Grunsky in 2022
- Born: August 15, 1971 (age 55); Vienna, Austria
- Occupation: Cinematographer
- Organizations: German Society of Cinematographers
- Website: http://www.matthias-grunsky.com

Matthias Grunsky (born August 15, 1971) is an Austrian cinematographer. Known for his intimate, unshowy lensing and Chiaroscuro lighting reminiscent of Rembrandt and Georges de La Tour, Grunsky first gained recognition for his contributions to US independent cinema through his acclaimed collaborations with Andrew Bujalski.

== Life and work ==
Grunsky began his career as a camera assistant in Austria and Germany, where he learnt from cinematographers such as Lee Daniel on Before Sunrise (1995).

His first feature-length movie as cinematographer was Funny Ha Ha (2002) for director Andrew Bujalski, with whom he continued to work on his following films. Grunsky used black and white video cameras with video camera tubes for the comedy drama film Computer Chess (2013), for which he was nominated for the Independent Spirit Award for Best Cinematography.

In 2019, Grunsky won Best Cinematography at the Midwest Independent Film Festival for the musical film Saints Rest (2019). That same year, he also won Best Cinematography at the History Film Fest for the television film Defiance. Three Women and the Vote. For the romantic comedy film There There (2022), which was shot remotely under Covid restrictions, Grunsky used iPhone cameras. In 2024, he collaborated with German director Edgar Reitz on "Leibniz – Chronicle of a Lost Painting" (2025), which premiered at the Berlinale 2025.

Alongside his cinematography, Grunsky develops his own films and installations with filmmaker Angela Bedekovic. Their three-screen video installation TOURIST received the Grand Prix for Media Art at the 31st Split Film Festival in 2026.

== Selected filmography ==
Year	Film	Director	Other notes
2002	Funny Ha Ha	Andrew Bujalski	
2005	Mutual Appreciation	Andrew Bujalski	
2007	American Zombie	Grace Lee	
2008	Nights and Weekends	Joe Swanberg & Greta Gerwig	
2009	Sorry, Thanks	Dia Sokol Savage	
2009	Beeswax	Andrew Bujalski	
2013	Man without a Head	Johnny Roc	
2013	Computer Chess	Andrew Bujalski	Nominated – Independent Spirit Award for Best Cinematography
2013	A Livre Ouvert	Stéphanie Chuat & Véronique Reymond	TV series (season 1) - RTS/ France 2
2015	Results	Andrew Bujalski	
2016	Infinity Baby	Bob Byington	
2016	Saints Rest	Noga Ashkenazi	Best Cinematography – Midwest Independent Film Festival 2019
2017	The Honor Farm	Karen Skloss	
2018	Support the Girls	Andrew Bujalski	
2019	Defiance. Three Women and the Vote	Beate Thalberg	Best Cinematography – History Film Fest 2019
2020	Marlene	Andreas Resch	
2021	Tales of Franz	Johannes Schmid	
2022	Bad Things in the Middle of Nowhere	Garry Walsh	
2022	New Tales of Franz	Johannes Schmid	
2022	There There	Andrew Bujalski	
2025	Leibniz – Chronicle of a Lost Painting	Edgar Reitz	
