= Brooklyn Decker =

American model and actress (born 1987)

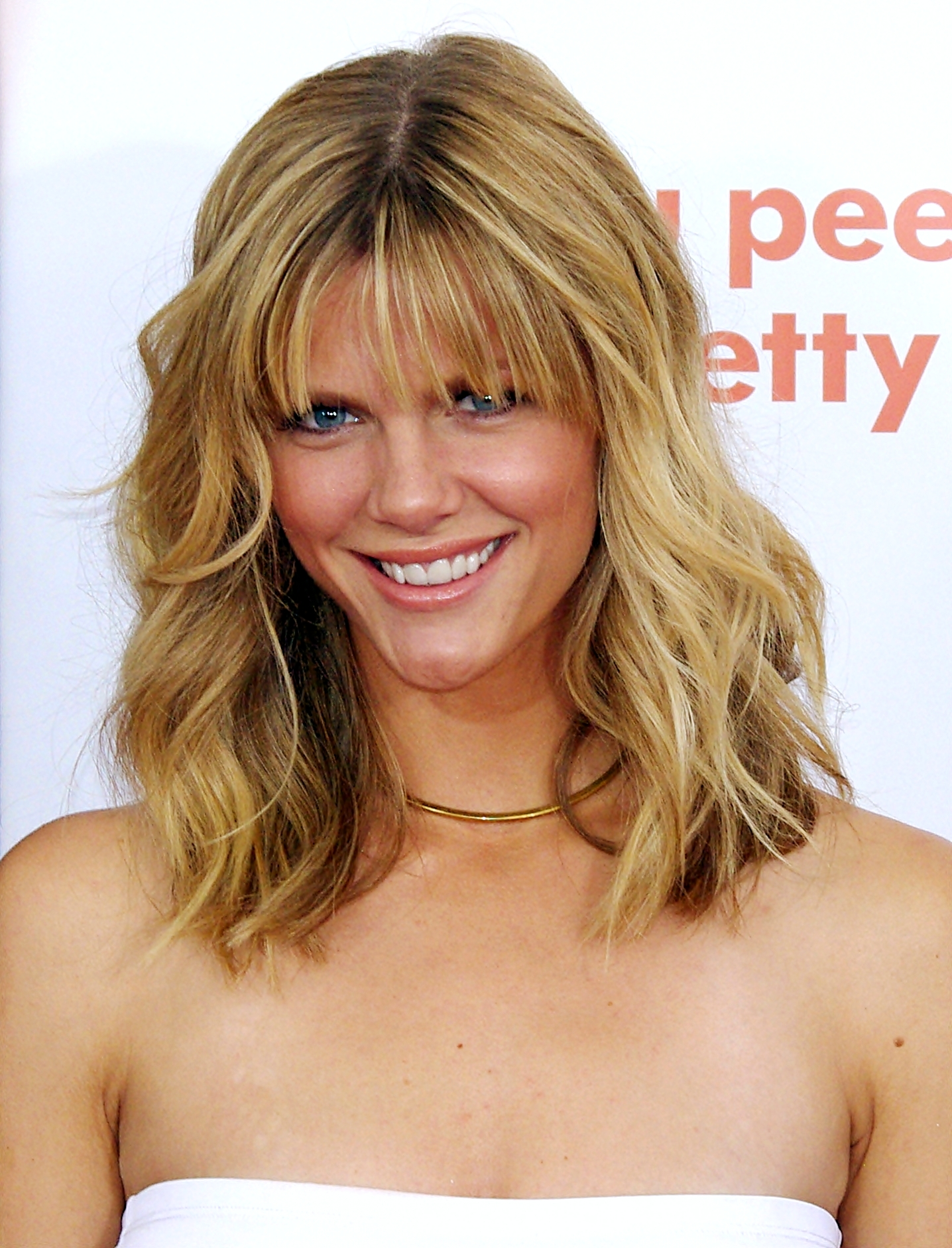
- Decker in 2012
- Born: Brooklyn Danielle Decker; April 12, 1987 (age 39); Kettering, Ohio, U.S.
- Occupations: Model; actress
- Years active: 2003–present
- Spouse: Andy Roddick (m. 2009)
- Children: 2
- Modeling information
- Height: 5 ft 9 in (1.75 m)
- Hair color: Blonde
- Eye color: Blue

Brooklyn Danielle Decker (born April 12, 1987) is an American model and actress, perhaps best known for her appearances in the Sports Illustrated Swimsuit Issue, including the cover of the 2010 issue. In addition to working for Victoria's Secret for the 2010 "Swim" collection, she has ventured into television with guest appearances on Chuck, Ugly Betty, The League, and Royal Pains. She made her feature film debut in Just Go with It (2011), and later starred in Battleship (2012) and What to Expect When You're Expecting (2012). In 2015, she was cast as a series regular, portraying Mallory Hanson, on Netflix's Grace and Frankie.

== Early life ==
Decker was born in Kettering, Ohio, a suburb of Dayton, the daughter of Tessa (née Moore), a nurse, and Stephen Decker, a pacemaker salesman. She has a younger brother, Jordan. She and her family moved to Middletown, Ohio, then to Matthews, North Carolina, a suburb of Charlotte. She graduated from David W. Butler High School, where she was a cheerleader and was elected senior class president.

Decker was discovered in a Charlotte shopping mall as a teenager, and began her modeling career as the face of Mauri Simone, a prom dress maker. She won the 2003 Model of the Year award at the Connections Model and Talent Convention.

== Career ==
External image
- Decker's Sports Illustrated Swimsuit Issue cover from February 12, 2010

Decker has been featured in editorials in Teen Vogue, Cosmopolitan, FHM and Glamour and graced international covers of GQ, Esquire, Glamour and Flare. She has appeared in campaigns for The Gap, Intimissimi and Victoria's Secret, and appeared in music videos for Jimmy Buffett and the band 3 Doors Down.

In 2005, within two months of moving to New York City, Decker auditioned for the Sports Illustrated Swimsuit Edition, in which she first appeared in 2006. She was again featured in the 2007 edition, and hosted the 2007 behind-the-scenes television special. She returned for a third consecutive time in 2008. Decker was chosen cover girl for the 2010 edition, shot on location in the Maldives islands. In 2007, she had a recurring feature on the CNN/SI website called "She Says, Z Says", along with Paul Zimmerman, discussing NFL football games of the week. Decker appeared in the 2007 made-for-television Lipshitz Saves the World. She worked for a period in Australia. She joined the cast of Sports New York to discuss the 2010 NCAA basketball tournament. In 2008, Decker rang the New York Stock Exchange bell with other Sports Illustrated models.

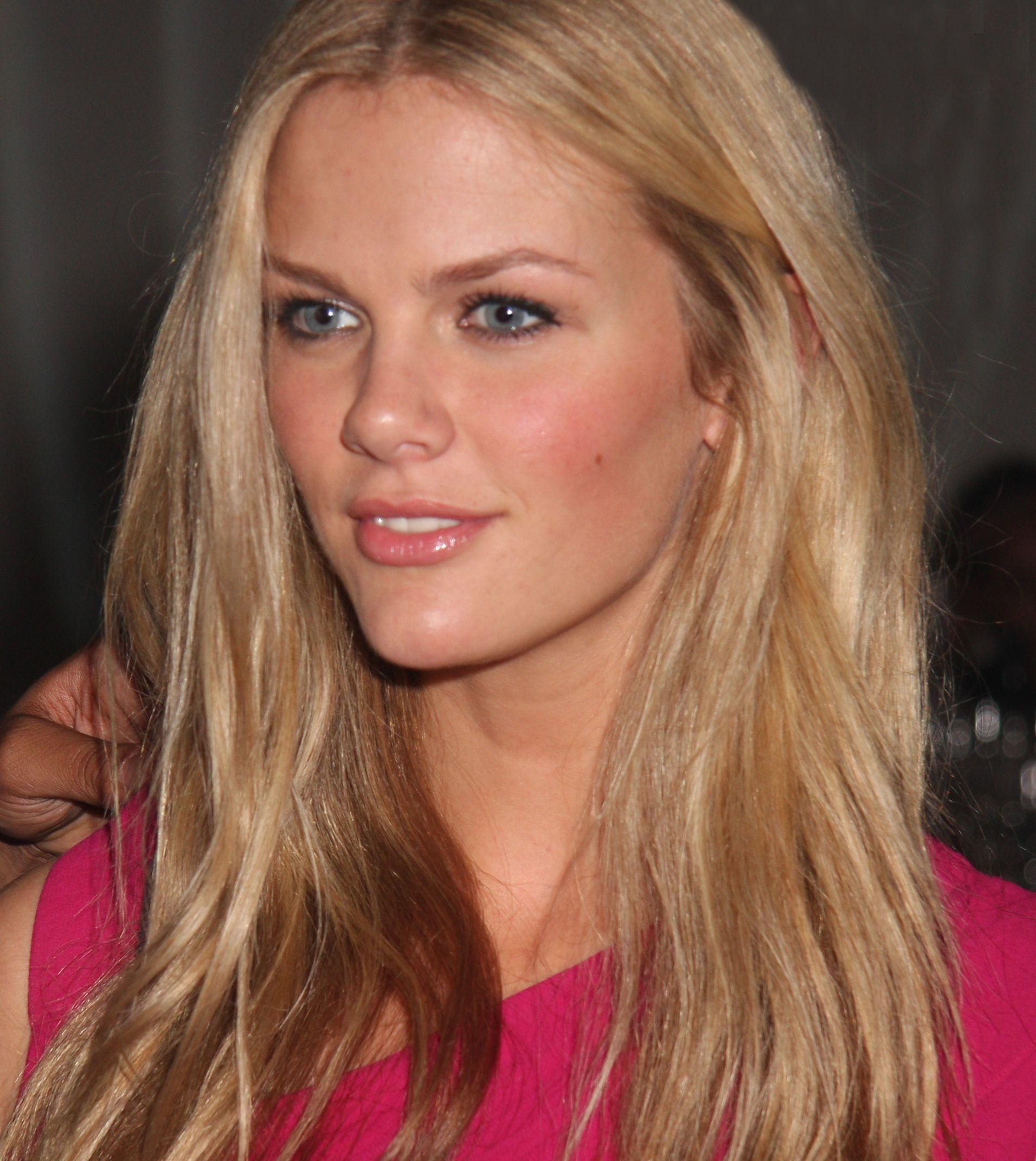
Decker in 2009

Decker made a guest appearance on NBC's Chuck, where she played a model applying to be a "Buy More Girl".

She made a guest appearance on USA Network's Royal Pains on July 30, 2009. Decker played swimsuit model Rachel, while Peter Jacobson played Alan, her nebbish husband.

On February 8, 2010, David Letterman announced on Late Show with David Letterman that Decker had been chosen as the 2010 Sports Illustrated Swimsuit covermodel. Calling her selection "the news of a lifetime", Decker admitted that her mother cried when she heard her daughter would grace the cover.

Decker served as a guest judge in the 5th cycle from Germany's Next Topmodel. She was reportedly considered for the lead female role in Transformers: Dark of the Moon. Decker won Esquire magazine's 2010 "Sexiest Woman Alive" bracket challenge.

In 2011, she was named one of the "100 Hottest Women of All-Time" by Men's Health, and MTV Networks' NextMovie.com named her one of the 'Breakout Stars to Watch for in 2011'.

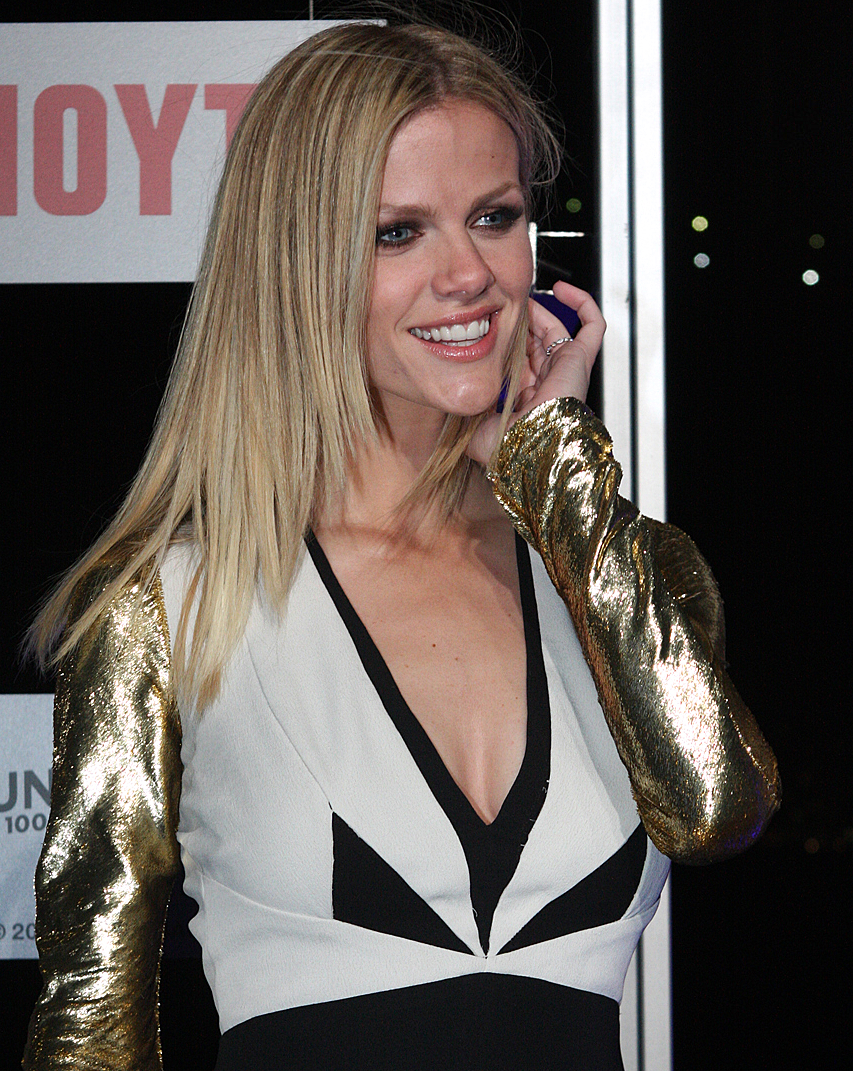
Decker at the Australian premiere of Battleship in 2012

In 2011, Decker was cast as the female lead, Samantha Shane, an admiral's daughter who works as a physical therapist, in the film Battleship, which was based on the board game of the same name. The role allowed her to spend some time with the Wounded Warriors Project. She also traveled to medical hospitals in Pearl Harbor and San Antonio and worked with troops who came back injured from overseas. She was also part of the ensemble cast of the comedy What to Expect When You're Expecting (2012), based on the book of the same name. She played the wife of Dennis Quaid's character.

In 2015, Decker took on a leading role as Mallory Hanson, the daughter of Jane Fonda's character Grace, in the Netflix comedy series Grace and Frankie, and her performance received critical acclaim. The series' seventh and final season aired in 2022.

== Personal life ==
Decker began dating American tennis player Andy Roddick in 2007, and they became engaged in March 2008. The couple married on April 17, 2009, and used to live in Roddick's home town of Austin, Texas; they now live in Charlotte, North Carolina. The couple have a son and a daughter. Roddick made a cameo in Decker's 2011 film Just Go with It as a tennis player whom her character meets on a plane home.

In her spare time, Decker continues to serve as a Global Ambassador for Special Olympics.

== Filmography ==
=== Film ===
Year	Title	Role	Notes
2006	The Devil Wears Prada	Paris Model	Uncredited
2009	Solitary Man	Woman Walking by Ben on the Bench	Uncredited
2011	Just Go with It	Palmer Dodge	
2012	Battleship	Samantha "Sam" Shane	
2012	What to Expect When You're Expecting	Skyler Cooper	
2014	Stretch	Candace	
2015	Results	Erin	
2016	Lovesong	Lily	
2016	Casual Encounters	Laura Leonard	
2017	Band Aid	Candice	
2018	Support the Girls	Kara	

=== Television ===
Year	Title	Role	Notes
2007	Lipshitz Saves the World	Rebecca Fellini	Unsold TV pilot
2009	Chuck	Job Applicant	Episode: "Chuck Versus the Beefcake"
2009	Royal Pains	Rachel Ryder	Episode: "The Honeymoon's Over"
2009	Ugly Betty	Lexie	Episode: "The Wiener, the Bun and the Boob"
2010	Extreme Makeover: Home Edition	Herself	Episode: "The Johnson Family"
2010	Double Exposure	Herself / Supermodel	Episode: "No One's Keeping You Here"
2012	The League	Gina Gibiatti	Episodes: "Our Dinner with Andre", "12.12.12", "The Curse of Shiva"
2013	New Girl	Holly	Episode: "Cooler"
2013–14	Hollywood Game Night	Herself	Episodes: "Twas the Game Night Before Christmas", "He Said, She Said"
2014	Friends with Better Lives	Jules Talley	13 episodes
2015–2022	Grace and Frankie	Mallory Hanson	Series regular; 79 episodes
2019	Celebrity Family Feud	Herself	Episode: "Brooklyn Decker and Andy Roddick vs. Bobby Bones and Tara Lipinski vs. Johnny Weir"
2019	Lip Sync Battle	Herself	Episode: "Brooklyn Decker vs. Andy Roddick"
2019	Match Game	Herself	Episode: "Michael Che/Kirstie Alley/Chris D'Elia/Sherri Shepherd/Mark Duplass/Brooklyn Decker"
2025	The Runarounds	Hannah Cooper	8 episodes

She has also appeared in several Dietz & Watson commercials along with her husband.

== Accolades ==
List of awards and nominations
Year	Award	Category	Work	Result
2011	Teen Choice Award	Choice Movie Breakout: Female	Just Go with It	Won
2012	Razzie Award	Worst Screen Couple (shared with Adam Sandler and either Decker or Jennifer Aniston)	Just Go with It	Nominated
2013	Razzie Award	Worst Supporting Actress	Battleship; What to Expect When You're Expecting	Nominated
2019	Texas Film Awards	Rising Star Award	Herself	Won
