= Game: On =

Game: On is a 2004 short film produced by Ethan Vogt, a student at New York University, as an advertisement for Volvo Cars. The work is the first to combine live action and machinima, the use of real-time computer animation from a three-dimensional graphics rendering engine. In 2005, the film won awards for Best Picture and Best Commercial/Game Machinima at the 2005 Machinima Film Festival.
