= Dietz & Watson =

American food company

Dietz & Watson, Inc.
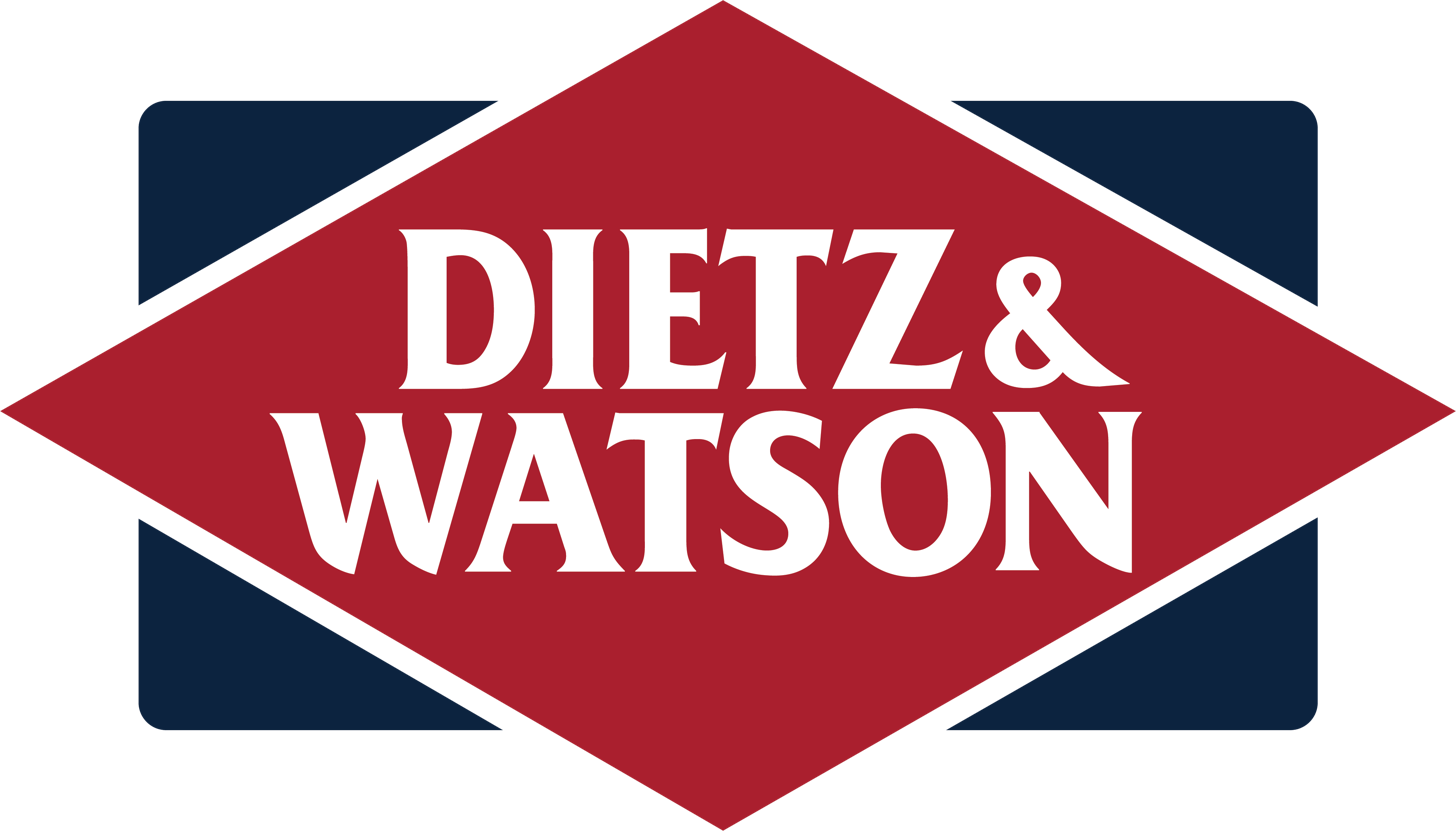
- Logo since 2020
- Type: Private
- Industry: Food; Meat
- Founded: 1939
- Founders: Gottlieb Dietz; Walter Watson
- Headquarters: Philadelphia, United States
- Area served: United States
- Key people: Louis Eni, CEO
- Products: Deli meats Cheeses
- Owner: Dietz family
- Website: www.dietzandwatson.com

Dietz & Watson, Inc. is an American family-owned and operated preparer of delicatessen foods, founded in 1939 and based in Philadelphia, Pennsylvania. The company specializes in the production and distribution of deli meats, cheeses, and other specialty food products.

== History ==
Dietz & Watson was founded by Gottlieb Dietz, a German sausage maker, who developed his skills while working at a meatpacking plant for almost two decades. In 1939, he purchased the Watson Meat Company and combined his name with Walter Watson, the former owner, who stayed on as the sales manager.

When Gottlieb died, his daughters Lore and Ruth Dietz took over the family company. Under Lore and Ruth, the company expanded to become the largest deli meat purveyor in Philadelphia. Ruth continued to offer guidance to the company until her death at age 94. The grandchildren of Gottlieb now run the business, including Louis Eni (President and CEO), Chris Eni (COO), and Cindy Eni Yingling (CFO).

The company prepares deli meats, franks, sausages, cheeses and condiments using Gottlieb’s original family recipes and cooking techniques. They are the first to introduce a No-Salt Added Turkey Breast to their product lineup, starting in 1978, when their CEO, Louis Sr., needed a low-sodium product to follow his strict lower sodium diet. They are also the first company to introduce Buffalo Chicken Breast and Santa Fe Turkey in 1997.

Dietz & Watson has facilities in Philadelphia, Baltimore, and Corfu, NY, and their products are distributed to national retailers, independent grocers, as well as online retailers such as Amazon Fresh. They currently employ over 1,000 people nationwide.

Currently, the company's television advertising campaign features actress/model Brooklyn Decker and her husband, tennis player Andy Roddick in domestic settings talking about the company's products.

== Products ==
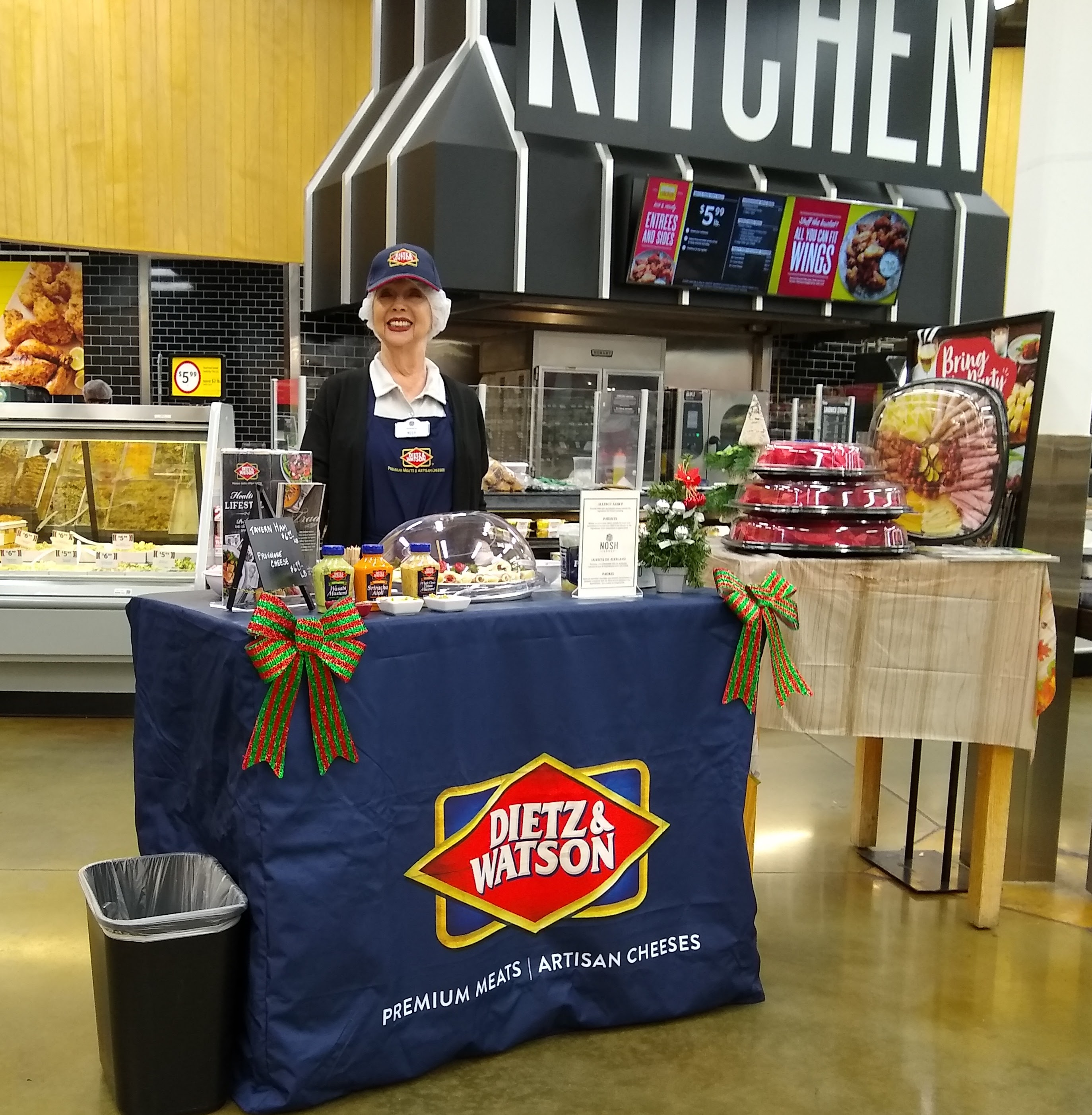
Dietz and Watson brand ambassador offering in-store product promotion in The Villages, Florida.

Dietz & Watson prepares over 700 products for supermarkets and delis made from chicken, ham, beef, turkey, and artisan cheese. The company also sells its own line of condiments. Dietz & Watson sources beef from the Midwest and pork imported from Canada. The company only sources their meat from farms that practice strict humanely raised standards while raising animals, and does not use artificial flavors, colors, fillers, extenders, MSG, or hormones. All of the company’s poultry comes from a family owned co-op in the Shenandoah Valley, VA. In 2015, they launched Dietz & Watson Originals, a collection of "no antibiotics ever" deli meats, organic deli meats, rBGH-free cheeses and organic beef hot dogs.

In June 2017, Dietz & Watson introduced "no antibiotics ever" snack items, including over 25 different varieties of salami, cheese, and cracker snack packs, individually packaged meats and cheeses, and assorted organic beef jerky.

In early 2019, Dietz and Watson began marketing Dietz Nuts, a landjaeger cut into small pieces. The Office star Craig Robinson is their commercial spokesman.

== Fire ==
On September 1, 2013, an 11-alarm fire that lasted over 72 hours burned through Dietz & Watson's Delanco, New Jersey, distribution center, destroying the 266,000 square foot facility. Firefighters were hampered by thousands of solar panels on the roof, which officials said posed a risk of electrocution. There were also water supply issues at the location. More than 300 firefighters from 60 to 70 municipalities and multiple counties were called to aid in fighting the blaze. After considering options, Dietz & Watson decided to move their distribution to the Tacony section of Philadelphia, next door to their other facility.

== Charity work ==
Dietz & Watson is actively involved in charity work, contributing to local charities such as the Police and Fire Departments, Philabundance, the Dietz & Watson Philadelphia Half Marathon, National Night Out, and the Battleship New Jersey Museum and Memorial. Nationally, they contribute to the Susan G. Komen organization and (in partnership with the USO, the Philadelphia Eagles and the Baltimore Ravens) the Hometown Heroes program. They also work with many charities and foods banks in partnership with local markets and delis across the country.
