= Pepper Binkley =

American actress

Pepper Binkley is an American actress, performer, writer, and director who works in film, television, theater, and commercials. She was a series regular in the fourth season of 1990s teen drama, Fifteen.

== Career ==
From 1992 to 1993, Binkley played the role of Pepper O'Brien in Fifteen, and later starred in a number of films, including Let Them Chirp Awhile (2007), Asylum Seekers (2009), and A Night Without Armor (2017). She created and starred in the 2018 web series, It's Freezing Out There, and has acted in numerous theatre productions, including Twelve Ophelias, Such Things Only Happen In Books, and My Dog Heart. To date, Binkley has appeared in approximately thirty TV shows and films.

== Filmography ==
=== Film ===
| Year | Title | Role | Notes |
|---|---|---|---|
| 2007 | And the Woods Fell Silent Again | Charlotte | Short film |
| 2007 | Let Them Chirp Awhile | Michelle | |
| 2008 | Eavesdrop | Jocelyn | |
| 2008 | Bastard of Orleans, or Looking for Joan | Pepper Knight | |
| 2009 | Asylum Seekers | Maud | |
| 2010 | Monkey, Take Off Your Mask! | Anne | Short film |
| 2010 | Stone | Young Madylyn Mabry | |
| 2010 | Weekend Away | Kelly | Short film |
| 2010 | Morning Glory | Jerry's Assistant | |
| 2012 | The Kitchen | Kim | |
| 2012 | The Exhibitionists | Regina Todd | |
| 2013 | Couch | Kat | Short film |
| 2014 | Mercy | Young Mercy | |
| 2015 | Halcyon | Sylvia | |
| 2015 | Charlie, Trevor and a Girl Savannah | Melanie | |
| 2015 | You Bury Your Own | Willa Ryan | |
| 2015 | Tumbledown | Girl fan | |
| 2015 | Hotel Room | Marguerite | Short film |
| 2016 | Red Folder | Mrs Traynor | Short film |
| 2017 | A Night Without Armor | Nicole Hughes | |
| 2017 | The Decades of Mason Carroll | Brooke | Short film |
| 2018 | Ladies Most Deject | Tamera | Short film |

=== Television ===
| Year | Title | Role | Notes |
|---|---|---|---|
| 1992–1993 | Fifteen | Pepper O'Brien | Regular role, 26 episodes |
| 2006 | The Bedford Diaries | April Jensen | 2 episodes: "I'm Gonna Love College", "Abstinence Makes the Heart Grow Fonder" |
| 2007 | Law & Order: Criminal Intent | Becky | 1 episode: "Lonelyville" |
| 2008 | All My Children | Nurse Bridget | 2 episodes |
| 2008 | Lipstick Jungle | Paige Berman | 1 episode: "Chapter 13: The Lyin', the Bitch and the Wardrobe" |
| 2009 | Heckle U | Duffy Parker | 4 episodes, uncredited |
| 2010 | Chuck | Sally | 1 episode: "Chuck Versus the American Hero" |
| 2011 | The Good Wife | Sergeant Regina Elkins | 1 episode: "Whiskey Tango Foxtrot" |
| 2013 | Could We Survive a Mega-Tsunami? | Rene | TV film documentary |
| 2013 | Masters of Sex | Adelaide | 1 episode: "All Together Now" |
| 2013/2014 | Writers' Block | Pepper | Unknown episodes |
| 2014 | Black Box | Stacey | 1 episode: "Free Will" |
| 2015 | The Following | Gillian | 1 episode: "The Hunt" |
| 2016 | I Love You... But I Lied | Emma | 1 episode: "Skeletons" |
| 2018 | It's Freezing Out There | Pepper | Web series |
| 2019 | Two Sentence Horror Stories | Emily | 1 episode: "Only Child" |

=== Audiobooks ===
- The Last Song by Nicholas Sparks
