= A Night Without Armor (film) =

- A Night Without Armor Poster
- Directed by: Steven Alexander
- Screenplay by: Chaun Domingue
- Produced by: Chaun Domingue
- Starring: Jacob Fishel, Pepper Binkley, Riley Domingue
- Release date: 2017
- Country: United States
- Language: English

A Night Without Armor is a 2017 American film directed and executive produced by Steven Alexander, written and produced by Chaun Domingue.

The film tells the story of a police captain who meets a nurse at an American Civil War era fort during a meteor shower.

== Plot ==
Police Captain Adam Foret (Jacob Fishel) arrives at Fort Jackson, a Civil War-era fort, to watch a meteor shower. He is soon joined by Nicole Hughes (Pepper Binkley), a pediatric nurse. Over the course of the night, the two engage in an extended conversation, revealing details about their marriages, worldviews, and personal struggles.

== Cast ==
- Jacob Fishel - Adam Foret
- Pepper Binkley - Nicole Hughes
- Riley Domingue - Cody Foret
