= Kate Dollenmayer =

American actor and film archivist

- Education: Harvard University (BA); California Institute of the Arts (MFA)
- Occupations: Actor; film archivist
- Years active: 2002–2005 (acting); 2013–present (archival work)
- Known for: Funny Ha Ha

Kate Dollenmayer is an American actor and film archivist. She (Note: Dollenmayer uses both "she/her" and "they/them" pronouns. This article uses "she/her" pronouns for consistency.) made her debut as the star of Andrew Bujalski's 2002 film Funny Ha Ha. She subsequently appeared in Bujalski's next film Mutual Appreciation in 2005.

== Early and personal life ==
Dollenmayer was born in Vermont and raised in Massachusetts. She attended public schools in Grafton and Hopkinton as a child, before graduating from high school at the Bancroft School in Worcester, Massachusetts.

Dollenmayer uses both "she/her" and "they/them" pronouns. She currently resides in Richmond, California.

== Career ==
Dollenmayer obtained her BA in Earth and Planetary Studies from Harvard University in 1998, where she additionally took courses in animation and film. She and Bujalski met at Harvard, where she was his friend and roommate prior to the filming of Funny Ha Ha. In a Washington Post review of Funny Ha Ha, Ann Hornaday praised her performance by writing, "Dollenmayer has managed to transform a sad sack into an indie screen goddess." For her work in the film, Dollenmayer placed third for the National Society of Film Critics' Best Actress award in 2006, tying with Vera Farmiga for her performance in Down to the Bone. After the success of Funny Ha Ha, a casting director approached Dollenmayer about potentially auditioning for a Judd Apatow comedy, but she declined the opportunity upon reading the script. According to Bujalski, this marked the end of her acting career, save for her brief appearance in his film Mutual Appreciation.

Dollenmayer received an MFA in film and video from California Institute of the Arts in 2003. From 2013 to 2017, she was an audiovisual archivist for the Wende Museum, where she contributed to the preservation of non-feature length films. She served as a film archivist at the Academy of Motion Picture Arts and Sciences from April 2018 to October 2022, before being promoted to senior archivist, where she worked until April 2023. Since 2016, she has served on the board of directors for the Center for Home Movies. As of 2024, she currently works as a film archivist for the Prelinger Archives.
