= Jonathan Blitstein =

American dramatist

- Born: October 28, 1982 (age 43); Lincolnshire, Illinois, U.S.
- Education: New York University (BFA)
- Occupations: Technologist, Media Executive, Angel Investor

Jonathan Blitstein is a technology, media and entertainment executive, angel investor, and former American film and theater producer, and indie filmmaker. He previously was an executive at Amazon Prime Video, Applovin, Tandem Pictures, Astronauts Wanted, (affiliated with Sony Music) and Disney Digital Network, a subsidiary of The Walt Disney Company.

Blitstein directed the independent mumblecore film Let Them Chirp Awhile and a play, Keep Your Baggage With You, for which he won the New York Innovative Theatre Award in 2011.

== Personal life and education ==
Blitstein was born on October 28, 1982, in Lincolnshire, Illinois. Blitstein graduated with a BFA from the Maurice Kanbar Institute of Film and Television Production at the Tisch School of the Arts." Blitstein previously studied acting at The Second City, the Piven Theatre Workshop, LAByrinth Theater Company, and Primary Stages.

== Plays ==
- Squealer produced with Lesser America in Spring 2011
- Keep Your Baggage With You (at all times) (2009) (First produced at Theater for the New City part of the Dream Up Festival, Summer 2010)

== Films ==
- Black Bear (2020) - Producer
- The Surrogate (2020) - Producer
- Let Them Chirp Awhile (2007) Feature Film
- Another Kind (2011) Feature Film
