= Mutual Appreciation =

- Promotional poster
- Directed by: Andrew Bujalski
- Written by: Andrew Bujalski
- Produced by: Ethan Vogt; Morgan Faust; Dia Sokol
- Starring: Justin Rice; Rachel Clift; Seung-Min Lee; Andrew Bujalski
- Cinematography: Matthias Grunsky
- Edited by: Andrew Bujalski
- Music by: Justin Rice; Kevin Micka; Bishop Allen; Omzo; Matt & Mossy; The Common Cold; Brandon Patton
- Distributed by: Goodbye Cruel Releasing
- Release date: March 2005 (South by Southwest Film Festival)
- Running time: 110 minutes
- Country: United States
- Language: English

Mutual Appreciation is a 2005 independent film by Andrew Bujalski who previously directed Funny Ha Ha (2002). The script is primarily dialogue between a group of young people as they try to determine where they fit in the world. It is considered part of the mumblecore movement.

== Plot ==
The principal characters are Lawrence, Ellie, Alan and Sara. Lawrence, a teaching assistant, and Ellie have been together for about a year. Lawrence loves Ellie, and she outwardly reciprocates while masking her doubts about their relationship. Sara is a radio disc jockey. She meets Alan, a former member of a band called The Bumblebees, at the radio station and invites him to her apartment.

== Cast ==
- Justin Rice as Alan
- Rachel Clift as Ellie
- Andrew Bujalski as Lawrence
- Seung-Min Lee as Sara
- Kevin Micka as Dennis
- Bill Morrison as Walter
- Pamela Corkey as Patricia
- Mary Varn as Rebecca
- Kate Dollenmayer as Hildy
- Keith Gessen as Julian

== Production ==
Shot in black-and-white, the film stars Justin Rice of the indie rock band Bishop Allen and features music from the band's debut album Charm School. Andrew Bujalski's previous film Funny Ha Ha starred Christian Rudder, also of Bishop Allen.

== Reception ==
On review aggregator website Rotten Tomatoes, the film holds an approval rating of 87% based on 54 reviews, and an average rating of 7.7/10. The website's critical consensus reads, "Director Bujalski continues to give cinematic voice to awkward, literate twentysomethings with noteworthy smarts and tenderness." On Metacritic, the film has a weighted average score of 84 out of 100, based on 21 critics, indicating "universal acclaim".
