= Computer Chess (film) =

- Theatrical release poster
- Directed by: Andrew Bujalski
- Written by: Andrew Bujalski
- Produced by: Houston King; Alex Lipschultz
- Starring: Patrick Riester; Wiley Wiggins; Myles Paige; Robin Schwartz; Gerald Peary; Gordon Kindlmann
- Cinematography: Matthias Grunsky
- Edited by: Andrew Bujalski
- Distributed by: Kino Lorber
- Release dates: January 21, 2013 (Sundance); July 17, 2013 (United States)
- Running time: 92 minutes
- Country: United States
- Language: English

Computer Chess is a 2013 independent comedy-drama film written and directed by Andrew Bujalski. The film premiered at the 2013 Sundance Film Festival, where it won the Alfred P. Sloan Feature Film Prize, and subsequently screened at such festivals as South by Southwest and the Maryland Film Festival.

It is Bujalski's second black-and-white film, and was shot with analog video cameras. It is more improvisational than his previous films, with only an eight-page treatment for a script. Bujalski also cast nonprofessional actors who were knowledgeable in computer technology.

== Plot summary ==
In 1980, an annual gathering of teams of idiosyncratic nerds compete in an undistinguished California hotel to see which of their computer programs can best the others at computer chess. A grandmaster (Gerald Peary) presides as master of ceremonies with a videographer and microphone in tow. Clunky, primitive personal computers are carted from room to room. Bad haircuts, dorky shirts, "birth control glasses", and other social impedimenta are ubiquitous. Bull sessions on the dystopian possibilities of artificial intelligence are pursued. The Pentagon's interest in the goings-on is intimated. The only female geek (Robin Schwartz) in attendance is repeatedly hailed and "welcomed" by the MC.

Simultaneously at the same hotel, a Human Potential Movement group (the "seekers") has occasional run-ins with the geeks, generating awkward and humorous moments. A painfully shy young computer programmer (Patrick Riester) attracts the interest of a swinging older couple (Cyndi Williams and Chris Doubek). The twin threads of "spiritual" exploration and cybernetic innovation imply an unspoken and implicit hidden connection. In a startling scene, a prostitute – apparently solicited by the young programmer – reveals herself to be infinitely more than expected.

== Cast ==
- Patrick Riester as Peter Bishton
- Wiley Wiggins as Martin Beuscher
- Myles Paige as Michael Papageorge
- Robin Schwartz as Shelly Flintic
- Gerald Peary as Pat Henderson
- Gordon Kindlmann as Tom Schoesser

== Production ==
=== Cinematography ===
The film was shot by cinematographer Matthias Grunsky using black-and-white analog video tube cameras from the 1970s, specifically Sony AVC-3260 models. Director Andrew Bujalski and Grunsky chose this obsolete technology to authentically recreate the visual aesthetic of early 1980s video technique. The tube cameras' characteristics—including their harsh contrast, image persistence, and distinctive handling of highlights—gave the film its period-appropriate look while also creating unexpected visual artifacts that enhanced the film's unsettling atmosphere.

Grunsky's cinematography earned him a nomination for Best Cinematography at the 2014 Independent Spirit Awards. The experimental approach to the film's visual style was praised by critics, with reviewers noting how the archaic video format contributed to the film's unique tone and humor.

== Reception ==
The movie has an approval rating of 88% on Rotten Tomatoes, with an average rating of 7.5/10. The site's critics' consensus reads: "With its delightfully retro production design, Computer Chess is an inventive, intelligent, and humorous comedy that celebrates the eccentricity and uniqueness of its subject." In The Village Voice, Aaron Hillis wrote that it was "the funniest, headiest, most playfully eccentric American indie of the year." Mike D'Angelo of The A.V. Club raved that the film was "the year's most singular and adventurous movie to date, to the point where it feels not so much original—a word that conveys a strong sense of craft—as it does "isolated", as in a mutant strain of a virus. What's more, it's fun, generating pleasure not from canned jokes or clichéd plot twists but simply from a sense of unhindered freedom."

Awards
Preceded by Robot & Frank	Alfred P. Sloan Prize Winner; 2013	Succeeded by I Origins
