= Support the Girls =

- Theatrical release poster
- Directed by: Andrew Bujalski
- Written by: Andrew Bujalski
- Produced by: Houston King; Sam Slater
- Starring: Regina Hall; Haley Lu Richardson; James LeGros; Shayna McHayle; Dylan Gelula; AJ Michalka; Brooklyn Decker; Jana Kramer; Lea DeLaria
- Cinematography: Matthias Grunsky
- Edited by: Karen Skloss
- Production companies: Burn Later Productions; Houston King Productions
- Distributed by: Magnolia Pictures
- Release dates: March 9, 2018 (SXSW); August 24, 2018 (United States)
- Running time: 91 minutes
- Country: United States
- Language: English
- Box office: $132,288

Support the Girls is a 2018 American comedy film written and directed by Andrew Bujalski. It stars Regina Hall, Haley Lu Richardson, James LeGros, Shayna McHayle, Dylan Gelula, AJ Michalka, Brooklyn Decker, Jana Kramer, John Elvis, Lea DeLaria, and Victor Isaac Perez.

The film had its world premiere at South by Southwest on March 9, 2018, and was theatrically released on August 24, 2018, by Magnolia Pictures. It received positive reviews from critics, with Hall's performance earning particular praise. Hall earned nominations at the Independent Spirit Awards and Gotham Independent Film Awards and won the New York Film Critics Circle Award for Best Actress, the first African-American to win the award.

== Plot ==
Lisa is the general manager of the sports bar and breastaurant Double Whammies. She takes her job seriously, protecting her employees from inappropriate or rude interactions with customers. Despite her commitment to the restaurant, her incompetent boss, Ben Cubby, has repeatedly threatened to fire her. His ire is provoked when Lisa has her employees host an off-the-books car wash to raise money for an employee, Shaina, who has hit her abusive boyfriend with her car and is staying at Lisa's house.

Despite Lisa's optimism, the day proves challenging: she has potential new employees to try out; an attempted robbery results in a man becoming stuck in a ventilation duct; one of her most trusted employees, Maci, turns out to be secretly dating a much older patron; another, Danyelle, is a single mother struggling with child care for her son; another gets a large tattoo of Steph Curry on her midsection despite tattoos being forbidden on employees; the bar is trying to get its cable fixed in time for a big fight that night; business is threatened by ManCave, another breastaurant developing in the area; and Lisa is separating from her depressed husband, Cameron. After Cubby scares Lisa during an episode of road rage, she calls Cameron for a ride.

Cubby fires Lisa and she forces herself to leave. When she returns home she learns from Shaina that Cameron has moved out. Shaina reveals that she is back together with her boyfriend and will use the fundraising money to pay his hospital bills. Furious, Lisa forces her to return the money. That night during the big fight, Maci and Danyelle, frustrated by the loss of Lisa, sabotage the cable in protest, leading to an awkward and tense scene with the customers and an off duty police officer. Danyelle and Maci are fired soon after.

The next day, Lisa, Maci, and Danyelle interview with ManCave. The interviewer tells Lisa that ManCave waitresses are unintelligent and easily replaced. Lisa, Maci and Danyelle sit on the rooftop drinking liquor stolen from Double Whammies and contemplate their future employment before letting out cathartic screams.

== Cast ==
- Regina Hall as Lisa Conroy
- Haley Lu Richardson as Maci
- James LeGros as Ben Cubby
- Shayna McHayle as Danyelle
- Dylan Gelula as Jennelle
- AJ Michalka as Krista
- Brooklyn Decker as Kara O'Shanahan
- Jana Kramer as Shaina
- John Elvis as Jay
- Lea DeLaria as Bobo
- Zoe Graham as Taylor
- Ann McCaskey as Reagan
- Elizabeth Trieu as Yejin
- Krista Hayes as Donnette
- Jermichael Gray as McKray
- Victor Isaac Perez as Isaac
- Sam Stinson as Chris
- Jonny Mars as Mark
- Steve Zapata as Arturo
- Bill Wise as Grady
- Lawrence Varnado as Cameron Conroy
- Dylan Samuel as Justin
- Kat Rogers as Jacqui

== Production ==
In May 2017, it was announced Haley Lu Richardson, James LeGros, Regina Hall, AJ Michalka, Dylan Gelula, Junglepussy, Lea DeLaria, Jana Kramer, and Brooklyn Decker had joined the cast of the film, with Andrew Bujalski directing from a screenplay he wrote. Sam Slater and Houston King served as producers on the film, under their Burn Later Productions and Houston King Productions banners, respectively.

=== Filming ===
Principal photography began in May 2017 in Texas.

== Release ==
The film had its world premiere at South by Southwest on March 9, 2018. Shortly after, Magnolia Pictures acquired U.S. distribution rights to the film. The film was theatrically released on August 24, 2018.

== Reception ==
On Rotten Tomatoes the film holds an approval rating of 91% based on 156 reviews, and an average rating of 7.7/10. The website's critical consensus reads, "Support the Girls handles serious themes—and a talented ensemble cast—with wit and humor, all while proving Regina Hall's talents have been woefully underutilized." On Metacritic the film has a weighted average score of 85 out of 100, based on 30 critics, indicating "universal acclaim".

David Fear wrote in Rolling Stone, "You could not ask for a better image of our country right now. You could not ask for a better American film to showcase it." Former President Barack Obama named the film one of his favorite movies of 2018.

=== Accolades ===
Award	Date of ceremony	Category	Recipient(s)	Result	Ref.
African-American Film Critics Association	December 11, 2018	Best Actress	Regina Hall	Won	
Americana Film Fest	March 5–10, 2019	Tops	Andrew Bujalski	Nominated	
Austin Film Critics Association	January 7, 2019	Best Actress	Regina Hall	Nominated	
Austin Film Critics Association	January 7, 2019	Austin Film Award	Andrew Bujalski	Won	
Black Reel Awards	February 7, 2019	Best Actress	Regina Hall	Runner-up	
Boston Online Film Critics Association	December 12, 2018	Best Ensemble	The cast of Support the Girls	Won	
Boston Online Film Critics Association	December 12, 2018	Ten Best Films of the Year	Support the Girls	7th Place	
Chicago Film Critics Association	December 8, 2018	Best Actress	Regina Hall	Nominated	
Chlotrudis Awards	March 17, 2019	Best Actress	Regina Hall	Won	
Chlotrudis Awards	March 17, 2019	Buried Treasure	Support the Girls	Won	
Florida Film Critics Circle	December 21, 2018	Best Cast	The cast of Support The Girls	Runner-up	
Gijón International Film Festival	November 19–26, 2018	Best Film	Support the Girls	Nominated	
Gotham Awards	November 26, 2018	Best Actress	Regina Hall	Nominated	
Gotham Awards	November 26, 2018	Best Screenplay	Andrew Bujalski	Nominated	
Houston Film Critics Society Awards	January 3, 2019	Visionary Award	Andrew Bujalski	Won	
Independent Spirit Awards	February 23, 2019	Best Female Lead	Regina Hall	Nominated	
International Online Cinema Awards	February 23, 2019	Best Actress	Regina Hall	Nominated	
Motovun Film Festival	July 23–27, 2019	Best Film	Andrew Bujalski	Nominated	
National Society of Film Critics	January 5, 2019	Best Actress	Regina Hall	Runner-up	
New York Film Critics Circle	November 29, 2018	Best Actress	Regina Hall	Won	
Online Film Critics Society Awards	January 2, 2019	Best Actress	Regina Hall	Nominated	
San Francisco Film Critics Circle	December 9, 2018	Best Actress	Regina Hall	Nominated	
Sarasota Film Festival	April 13–22, 2018	Narrative Feature	Andrew Bujalski	Nominated	
Seattle Film Critics Society	December 17, 2018	Best Actress	Regina Hall	Nominated	
SXSW Film Festival	March 9–18, 2018	Narrative Spotlight	Andrew Bujalski	Nominated	
Toronto Film Critics Association	December 9, 2018	Best Actress	Regina Hall	Nominated	
Vancouver Film Critics Circle	December 17, 2018	Best Actress	Regina Hall	Won	
