= Wiley Wiggins =

American actor

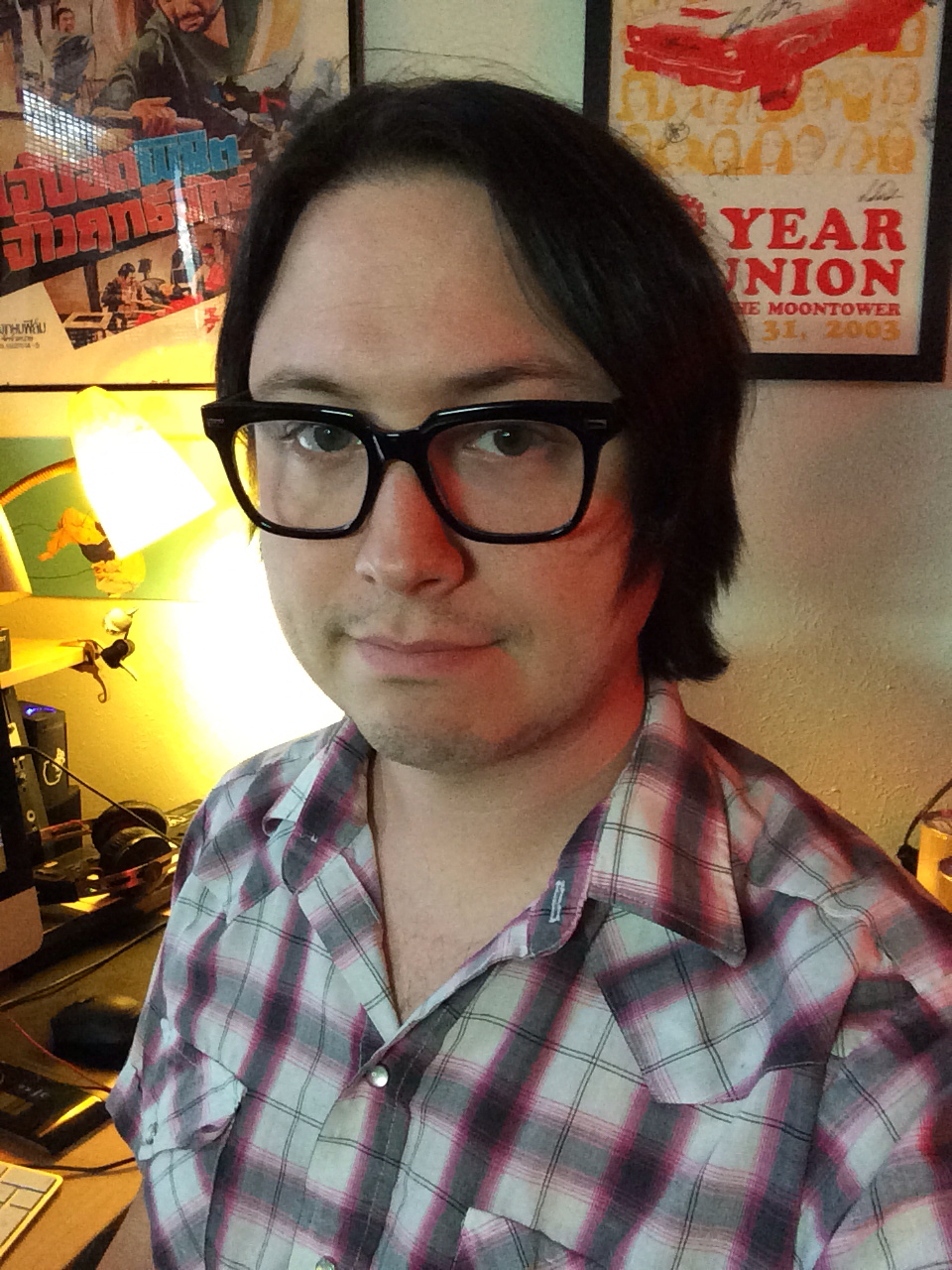
- Wiggins in 2013
- Born: Wiley Ramsey Wiggins; November 6, 1976 (age 49); Austin, Texas, U.S.
- Occupation: Actor
- Years active: 1993–2018
- Website: www.wileywiggins.com

Wiley Ramsey Wiggins (born November 6, 1976) is an American former actor.

== Biography ==
Wiggins was born in Austin, Texas. At the age of 16, Wiggins starred in Richard Linklater's 1993 film Dazed and Confused. He had not initially planned on an acting career, stating that he was approached by a member of the film's casting department outside of an Austin coffee shop, who asked if he was interested in auditioning.

Wiggins later appeared in Linklater's Waking Life and C.M. Talkington's indie crime drama Love and a .45 with Renée Zellweger.

== Filmography ==
- Dazed and Confused (1993) as Mitch Kramer
- Love and a .45 (1994) as Young Store Clerk
- Boys (1996) as John Phillips
- Plastic Utopia (1997) as Jogger Joe
- The Faculty (1998) as F'%# Up #2
- Waking Life (2001) as Main Character; also one of the animators
- Frontier (2001) as Soldier
- Goliath (2008) as Alvin
- Sorry, Thanks (2009) as Max Callahan
- Computer Chess (2013) as Martin Beuscher

=== Production roles ===
- Editor: The Outlaw Son (2007)
- Producer: Frontier (2001) (co-producer)
- Self: The Art Show (2004)
