= Andrew Bujalski =

American film director

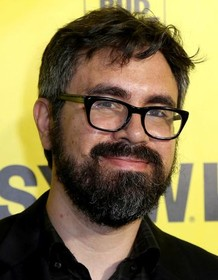
- Andrew Bujalski at SXSW
- Born: April 29, 1977 (age 49); Boston, Massachusetts, U.S.
- Education: Harvard University
- Occupations: Film director; screenwriter; actor
- Years active: 2002–present
- Spouse: Karen Olsson (m. 2009)
- Children: 2

Andrew Bujalski (/bʊˈdʒælski/; born April 29, 1977) is an American film director, screenwriter and actor, who has been called the "godfather of mumblecore."

== Life and career ==
Bujalski, born in Boston in 1977, is the son of artist-turned-businesswoman Sheila Dubman and businessman Edmund Bujalski. His father is Catholic and his mother is Jewish. He grew up in Newton, Massachusetts, where he attended the same high school as Beeswax collaborator Alex Karpovsky (although the two didn't know each other at the time). Bujalski studied film at Harvard's Department of Visual and Environmental Studies, where the Belgian filmmaker Chantal Akerman was his thesis advisor.

He shot his first feature, Funny Ha Ha, in 2002 and followed it with Mutual Appreciation in 2003. They received theatrical distribution in 2005 and 2006, respectively. Bujalski wrote both screenplays and appears as an actor, playing a major role in both films. In 2006, he appeared as an actor and contributed to the screenplay of the Joe Swanberg film Hannah Takes the Stairs.

Beeswax and Computer Chess, Bujalski's third and fourth films, were filmed in Austin, where the director lives. Beeswax was released in summer 2009. While making it Bujalski wrote a screenplay adaptation of Benjamin Kunkel's 2005 novel Indecision for Paramount Pictures.

His fourth feature, Computer Chess, is a period film set at a computer programming tournament in 1980. It premiered at the 2013 Sundance Film Festival and won the Alfred Sloan Feature Film Prize. It is his first feature edited digitally and the only feature film shot almost exclusively with original Sony 1968 AVC-3260 B&W video cameras.

Bujalski married Karen Olsson in 2009. They have two children.

Bujalski also has worked as a writer on several studio projects, including the live-action remake of Disney's Lady and the Tramp.

== Style and content ==
Bujalski's rough-edged, realistic films are often compared to the works of directors John Cassavetes, Maurice Pialat and Mike Leigh. All seven of his feature films were photographed by Austrian cinematographer Matthias Grunsky, with whom he has maintained a collaborative partnership since Funny Ha Ha (2002). The first three are shot on hand-held 16mm, have a sometimes decidedly "lo-fi" feel (reinforced by Funny Ha Ha's distorted mono sound), and are often classified as "Mumblecore". The actors are non-professionals, many drawn from other media, including animator Kate Dollenmayer as the lead in Funny Ha Ha, musician Justin Rice as the lead in Mutual Appreciation and experimental filmmaker Bill Morrison in a supporting role in the same film. Funny Ha Ha featured a cast and crew of Harvard alumni.

Though his films often appear improvised, they are, for the most part, scripted; the dialogue is often noted for its drawn-out, awkward nature, and characters frequently evade key topics. Many of the films seem to start and end in medias res, giving the films a "slice of life" feeling that suggests a larger narrative or world that the audience is looking in on.

The characters in Bujalski's films are mostly middle-class. The desire for stability is a recurring theme, and many characters rush headlong into attempts at a more controlled existence; one of the main characters in Funny Ha Ha elopes with his ex-girlfriend.

Bujalski and Grunsky's ongoing collaboration is characterized by technical experimentation. For Computer Chess (2013), they shot on black-and-white video tube cameras from the 1970s, earning Grunsky an Independent Spirit Award nomination for Best Cinematography. For There There (2022), filmed during the COVID-19 pandemic, they worked entirely remotely using iPhones, with the director and cinematographer never physically present on set and actors never meeting their scene partners in person.

== Filmography ==
=== As director, writer, and editor ===
Year	Film	Type	Credited as		
Year	Film	Type	Director	Writer	Editor
2002	Funny Ha Ha	Feature film	Yes	Yes	Yes
2005	Mutual Appreciation	Feature film	Yes	Yes	Yes
2007	Peoples House	Short film	Yes	Yes	Yes
2009	Beeswax	Feature film	Yes	Yes	Yes
2013	Computer Chess	Feature film	Yes	Yes	Yes
2015	Results	Feature film	Yes	Yes	No
2018	Support the Girls	Feature film	Yes	Yes	No
2019	Lady and the Tramp	Feature film	No	Yes	No
2022	There There	Feature film	Yes	Yes	Yes

=== As actor ===
Year	Film	Role
2002	Funny Ha Ha	Mitchell
2005	Mutual Appreciation	Lawrence
2007	Hannah Takes the Stairs	Paul
2008	Cubby Knowles	DJ Whoops
2008	Goliath	Terry
2008	RSO (Registered Sex Offender)	Reggie
2009	Sorry, Thanks	Mason

== Awards ==
- Alfred Sloan Feature Film Prize, 2013 – Sundance Film Festival
- Best Director, 2005 – Sidewalk Moving Picture Festival
- Best Screenplay, 2005 – Newport International Film Festival
- Someone to Watch Award, 2004 – IFP
