= Funny Ha Ha =

- Directed by: Andrew Bujalski
- Written by: Andrew Bujalski
- Produced by: Ethan Vogt
- Starring: Kate Dollenmayer; Christian Rudder; Andrew Bujalski; Jennifer L. Schaper
- Cinematography: Matthias Grunsky
- Edited by: Andrew Bujalski
- Distributed by: Fox Lorber; Sundance Channel; Goodbye Cruel Releasing; Wellspring Media
- Release dates: September 2002 (Sidewalk Moving Picture Festival); April 16, 2005 (United States)
- Running time: 89 minutes
- Country: United States
- Language: English
- Box office: $82,620

Funny Ha Ha is a 2002 American film written and directed by Andrew Bujalski. It has been described as the first mumblecore film. It was shot on 16 mm film on a very low budget. It deals with the lives of people in their twenties as they try to come to terms with life after college and confront the responsibilities of adulthood, if only to put them off for as long as possible.

== Plot ==
Marnie is a recent graduate and is trying to find a temporary job. She wants to win the attention of a college friend named Alex (who is already in a relationship), while trying to cut down on her beer consumption. The story takes place around the Allston neighborhood of Boston, Massachusetts.

== Reception ==
The film was well received by critics, who praised it for its realism. On Rotten Tomatoes the film has an approval rating of 88% based on reviews from 41 critics. On Metacritic the film has a score of 78 out of 100 based on reviews from 16 critics, indicating "generally favorable" reviews.

Wesley Morris of The Boston Globe called the film a "smartly observed, unpretentious, and unconventional comedy of manners," adding that "Bujalski has a bracingly unadorned style, and Matthias Grunsky's handheld photography is actually quite lovely." Daily Variety 's Robert Koehler said the movie was "beautifully observant and wholly unpretentious". The film was well received by critics, who praised it for its realism.

It was named to top 10 lists by A.O. Scott of The New York Times, Kimberley Jones of The Austin Chronicle, Marc Mohan of The Oregonian and Robert Koehler of Variety.

The film's widest release was three theaters. It grossed $82,620.

The film later came to be described as the first mumblecore film, a new genre of American filmmaking characterized by low budgets, amateur actors and naturalistic settings.

== Blu-ray ==
The film was released on Blu-ray in 2017 by Factory 25. It included essays by Chuck Klosterman and Tao Lin.

== Awards ==
Andrew Bujalski was the winner of the 2004 Someone to Watch Award at the Independent Spirit Awards. The film won the featured film award at the 2004 Black Point Film Festival. In 2005, Kate Dollenmayer was runner-up for the National Society of Film Critics Best Actress award. The following year, she was also nominated for the Best Actress award by the Chlotrudis Society, who praised her "natural, nuanced performance".
