= SCCSD =

SCCSD may refer to:

- Sioux City Community School District, Sioux City, Iowa
- South Country Central School District, Brookhaven, New York
- Sunflower County Consolidated School District, Sunflower County, Mississippi
