= Unplanned Parenthood =

Unplanned Parenthood may refer to:

- "Unplanned Parenthood" (House)
- "Unplanned Parenthood", a song by Busdriver from Temporary Forever
- "Unplanned Parenthood", a song by Farrah Abraham from My Teenage Dream Ended
- "Unplanned Parenthood", an episode from season 10 of Cheers
- "Unplanned Parenthood", a book by Liz Carpenter

== See also ==
- Unintended pregnancy
