= Sunshine State =

Sunshine State may refer to:

== Places with the nickname ==
- Queensland, Australia
- Ondo State, Nigeria
- Florida, US (official)
- South Dakota, US (unofficial)

== Arts and entertainment ==
- Sunshine State (film), a 2002 American film by John Sayles
- "The Sunshine State" (Prison Break), a 2008 TV episode
- Sunshine State, a webcomic by Graham Nolan
- Sunshine State, a 2021 EP, or the title song, by Pixey
- "The Sunshine State", a 2012 song by Farrah Abraham from My Teenage Dream Ended

== Other uses ==
- Florida's Turnpike, originally the Sunshine State Parkway, a toll road in Florida, US
- Sunshine State Conference, an American college athletic conference
- Sunshine Showdown, name given to the football rivalry between the Florida Gators and Florida State Seminoles.
