= Abraham Lincoln High School (Council Bluffs, Iowa) =

Public secondary school in Council Bluffs, Iowa, United States

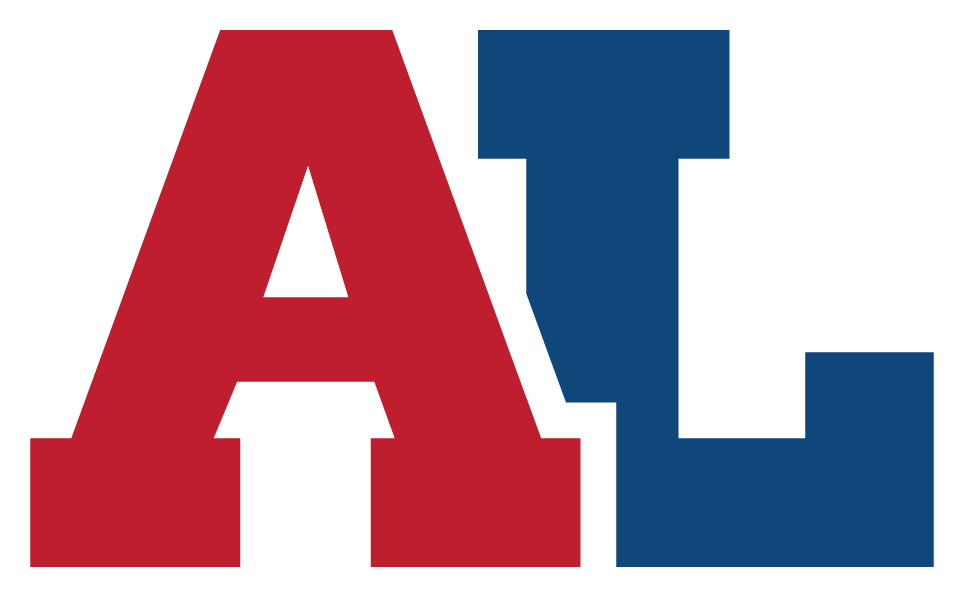

Location
- 1205 Bonham Avenue; Council Bluffs, Iowa 51503; USA; 41°15′27.3″N 95°49′09.8″W

Information
- Type: Public, Coeducational
- Motto: Relationships, Optimism, Character, Critical Thinking, Kindness (R.O.C.C.K.)
- Established: 1871 (as Council Bluffs High School)
- School district: Council Bluffs Community School District
- Principal: Rachel Bruce Sagert
- Teaching staff: 86.85 (FTE)
- Grades: 9–12
- Enrollment: 1,333 (2024-2025)
- Student to teacher ratio: 15.35
- Campus type: Suburban
- Colors: Crimson and Blue
- Athletics conference: Missouri River Conference
- Mascot: Lynx
- Rival: Thomas Jefferson High School
- Newspaper: Echoes
- Website: al.cb-schools.org

Abraham Lincoln High School is a public high school located in Council Bluffs, Iowa, United States. It is one of two high schools in the Council Bluffs Community School District.

== Demographics ==
The demographic breakdown of the 1,334 students enrolled for the school year 2017–2018 was as follows:

=== By gender ===
- Male – 50.9%
- Female – 49.1%

=== By race ===
- White – 80.9%
- Hispanic – 11.3%
- Multiracial – 3.6%
- African American – 1.4%
- Native American/Alaskan – 1.2%
- Asian/Pacific Islander – 1.1%

== Athletics ==
The Lynx compete in the Missouri River Conference in the following sports:

- Baseball
- Basketball
- Bowling
- Cross Country
  - Boys' 1948 State Champions
- Football
- Golf
- Soccer
- Softball
- Swimming
- Tennis
- Track and Field
- Volleyball
- Wrestling

== Notable alumni ==
- Stan Bahnsen, former professional baseball player (New York Yankees, Chicago White Sox, Oakland Athletics, Montreal Expos, California Angels, Philadelphia Phillies)
- Dan Dawson, current member of the Iowa Senate
- Nina Korgan, women's softball pitching star (Jax Brewery Maids of New Orleans)
- Philip N. Krasne, producer of the later Charlie Chan films and The Cisco Kid television series
- Jon Lieber, former professional baseball player (Pittsburgh Pirates, Chicago Cubs, New York Yankees, Philadelphia Phillies)
- Nathan Pusey, 24th president of Harvard University (1953-1971)
- Farrah Abraham - notable TV personality
- Josh Turek - Iowa House Representative from the 20th district, candidate for US Senate in 2026

== See also ==
- List of high schools in Iowa
