= East High School (Sioux City, Iowa) =

Public secondary school in Sioux City, Iowa, United States

Location
- 3200 S. Cypress Street; Sioux City, Iowa 51106; United States; 42.4524°N 96.3403°W

Information
- Type: Public
- Established: 1920
- School district: Sioux City Community Schools
- Superintendent: Rod Earleywine
- NCES School ID: 192640001504
- Principal: Richard Todd
- Teaching staff: 76.22 (FTE)
- Grades: 9-12
- Enrollment: 1,511 (2023-2024)
- Student to teacher ratio: 19.82
- Colors: Orange and Black
- Athletics conference: IHSAA – MRC
- Mascot: Black Raider
- Website: east-high.siouxcityschools.org/

East High School, or Sioux City East High School, is a public high school located in Sioux City, Iowa. It is one of three high schools in the Sioux City Community School District, and is fed by East Middle School, Nodland Elementary School, Sunnyside Elementary School, Morningside Elementary School, Spalding Park Elementary School, and Unity Elementary School and Students living South of Irving Elementary.

== History ==
Sioux City East High School was founded in 1920 and its original location was on Morningside Avenue just across the street from Morningside College. In 1972, the Sioux City Community School district put in the plan to build three brand new high schools for all three public schools. East then moved to S. Cypress Street, which is located by the Southern Hills Mall in Sioux City. East was one of three other public schools to be founded in Sioux City along with Leeds, Riverside, and Central high schools. The private school in Sioux City at that time was Trinity and Cathedral high schools which now make up Bishop Heelan High School. Trinity primarily consisted of all male and Cathedral was all female. Sioux City East is the only High School in Sioux City to remain in its original state. Riverside became what is now Sioux City West and Central became Sioux City North. East has also kept its same mascot, the Black Raider since its existence. However, because of restrictions on their logo, East had to change their logo from a native war like figure to a Raider who more resembled a Knight.

== Athletics ==
The Black Raiders compete in the Missouri River Conference for both boys and girls sports.

- Baseball
- Basketball
  - Boys' 2-time State Champions (1934, 2002)
- Bowling
- Cross Country
- Football
  - 1984 Class 4A State Champions
- Golf
- Soccer
- Softball
- Swimming
- Tennis
- Track and Field
  - Boys' 1945 State Champions
- Volleyball
- Wrestling

== Performing arts ==
=== Vocal music ===
The Vocal Music Program at East High School has ten choral ensembles, including modern a cappella and show choir. The Choirs at East give four concerts each year in addition to a Renaissance Madrigal Dinner every December. The Chamber Choir has performed at Carnegie Hall. They have won awards at competitions throughout the country, including Grand Champion, Best Choral Tone, and Best Repertoire at FAME Los Angeles (2008), Best Repertoire and First Runner-Up at FAME Chicago (2010), Grand Champion, Best Soprano, Alto, Tenor, and Bass Sections at the Grand River Concert Choir Competition (2012), First Runner-Up at FAME Chicago (2014), and Grand Champion, Best Choral Tone, and Best Repertoire at Heart Of America-Cincinnati (2017). In 2016, they came first in Morningside College's Choral Composition Competition Festival.

In 2025, East High School currently has five choirs and four show choirs. There are five choirs, including a bass choir and a treble choir. These choirs are open to all students; however, they are primarily composed of freshmen. There is also a mixed raider choir, which is the non try-out choir for upperclassmen. Additionally, there is a varsity women's choir and a chamber choir, both of which are audition-only. There are four show choirs, including New Sound, which is the freshman boys and girls. Entourage is an open male-only show choir. Prestige is an audition-based varsity women's show choir. Then, there is Headliners, another audition-only show choir, their mixed varsity show choir.

Since 2013, East has collaborated with neighboring Bishop Heelan, North, and West high schools in producing an annual Men's Choir Festival entitled "Man Up & Sing".

== Notable alumni ==
- Stanley L. Greigg, former mayor of Sioux City and Iowa State Representative.
- Cele Hahn, former broadcaster turned politician
- Matthew C. Harrison, 13th president of the Lutheran Church–Missouri Synod
- Shelby Houlihan, Olympic runner
- Kayla Klingensmith, professional wrestler best known as Kiana James
- J. D. Scholten, politician
- Bob Scott, longest serving mayor of Sioux City.
- Dom Thompson-Williams, baseball player

== See also ==
- List of high schools in Iowa
