= 2015 Major League Baseball draft =

Major League Baseball draft

General information
- Date: June 8–10, 2015
- Location: Secaucus, New Jersey
- Network: MLB Network

Overview
- 1,215 total selections
- First selection: Dansby Swanson; Arizona Diamondbacks
- First round selections: 42

The 2015 Major League Baseball draft was held from June 8 through June 10, 2015, to assign amateur baseball players to MLB teams. The draft order is the reverse order of the 2014 MLB season standings. As the Diamondbacks finished the 2014 season with the worst record, they had the first overall selection. In addition, the Houston Astros had the 2nd pick of the 2015 draft, as compensation for failing to sign Brady Aiken, the first overall selection of the 2014 MLB draft.

Twelve free agents received and rejected qualifying offers of $15.3 million for the 2015 season, entitling their teams to compensatory draft choices if they are signed by another team. The team signing the player will lose their first round choice, though the first ten picks are protected. The New York Mets surrendered their first round pick (15th overall) to sign Michael Cuddyer, while the Colorado Rockies gained a supplementary pick. The Toronto Blue Jays lost their pick for signing Russell Martin, giving a compensatory pick to the Pittsburgh Pirates. The Boston Red Sox surrendered their second- and third-round picks (Boston's first pick is protected) to sign Pablo Sandoval and Hanley Ramírez. The San Francisco Giants and Los Angeles Dodgers received supplementary picks.

== First round selections ==
Key
	All-Star
*	Player did not sign

Pick	Player	Team	Position	School
1	Dansby Swanson	Arizona Diamondbacks	Shortstop	Vanderbilt
2	Alex Bregman	Houston Astros (Note: Compensation pick for failing to sign Brady Aiken in the 2014 draft.)	Shortstop	LSU
3	Brendan Rodgers	Colorado Rockies	Shortstop	Lake Mary High School (FL)
4	Dillon Tate	Texas Rangers	Right-handed pitcher	UC Santa Barbara
5	Kyle Tucker	Houston Astros	Outfielder	H.B. Plant High School (FL)
6	Tyler Jay	Minnesota Twins	Left-handed pitcher	Illinois
7	Andrew Benintendi	Boston Red Sox	Outfielder	Arkansas
8	Carson Fulmer	Chicago White Sox	Right-handed pitcher	Vanderbilt
9	Ian Happ	Chicago Cubs	Outfielder	Cincinnati
10	Cornelius Randolph	Philadelphia Phillies	Shortstop	Griffin High School (GA)
11	Tyler Stephenson	Cincinnati Reds	Catcher	Kennesaw Mountain High School (GA)
12	Josh Naylor	Miami Marlins	First baseman	St. Joan of Arc Catholic Secondary School (ON)
13	Garrett Whitley	Tampa Bay Rays	Outfielder	Niskayuna High School (NY)
14	Kolby Allard	Atlanta Braves	Left-handed pitcher	San Clemente High School (CA)
15	Trent Grisham	Milwaukee Brewers	Outfielder	Richland High School (TX)
16	James Kaprielian	New York Yankees	Right-handed pitcher	UCLA
17	Brady Aiken	Cleveland Indians	Left-handed pitcher	IMG Academy (FL)
18	Phil Bickford	San Francisco Giants	Right-handed pitcher	College of Southern Nevada
19	Kevin Newman	Pittsburgh Pirates	Shortstop	Arizona
20	Richie Martin	Oakland Athletics	Shortstop	Florida
21	Ashe Russell	Kansas City Royals	Right-handed pitcher	Cathedral High School (IN)
22	Beau Burrows	Detroit Tigers	Right-handed pitcher	Weatherford High School (TX)
23	Nick Plummer	St. Louis Cardinals	Outfielder	Brother Rice High School (MI)
24	Walker Buehler	Los Angeles Dodgers	Right-handed pitcher	Vanderbilt
25	D. J. Stewart	Baltimore Orioles	Outfielder	Florida State
26	Taylor Ward	Los Angeles Angels	Catcher	Fresno State

=== Compensatory round ===
Pick	Player	Team	Position	School
27	Mike Nikorak	Colorado Rockies (Note: Compensation pick for the New York Mets signing Michael Cuddyer)	Right-handed pitcher	Stroudsburg High School (PA)
28	Mike Soroka	Atlanta Braves (Note: Compensation pick for the Minnesota Twins signing Ervin Santana)	Right-handed pitcher	Bishop Carroll High School (AB)
29	Jon Harris	Toronto Blue Jays (Note: Compensation pick for the Chicago White Sox signing Melky Cabrera)	Right-handed pitcher	Missouri State
30	Kyle Holder	New York Yankees (Note: Compensation pick for the Chicago White Sox signing David Robertson)	Shortstop	San Diego
31	Chris Shaw	San Francisco Giants (Note: Compensation pick for the Boston Red Sox signing Pablo Sandoval)	First baseman	Boston College
32	Ke'Bryan Hayes	Pittsburgh Pirates (Note: Compensation pick for the Toronto Blue Jays signing Russell Martin)	Third baseman	Concordia Lutheran High School (TX)
33	Nolan Watson	Kansas City Royals (Note: Compensation pick for the San Diego Padres signing James Shields)	Right-handed pitcher	Lawrence North High School (IN)
34	Christin Stewart	Detroit Tigers (Note: Compensation pick for the Washington Nationals signing Max Scherzer)	Outfielder	Tennessee
35	Kyle Funkhouser*	Los Angeles Dodgers (Note: Compensation pick for the Boston Red Sox signing Hanley Ramírez)	Right-handed pitcher	Louisville
36	Ryan Mountcastle	Baltimore Orioles (Note: Compensation pick for the Seattle Mariners signing Nelson Cruz)	Shortstop	Hagerty High School (FL)

=== Competitive balance round A ===
Pick	Player	Team	Position	School
37	Daz Cameron	Houston Astros (Note: The Astros acquired the 37th pick from the Miami Marlins along with Jake Marisnick, Colin Moran, and Francis Martes for Jarred Cosart, Enrique Hernández, and Austin Wates.)	Outfielder	Eagle's Landing Christian Academy (GA)
38	Tyler Nevin	Colorado Rockies	Third baseman	Poway High School (CA)
39	Jake Woodford	St. Louis Cardinals	Right-handed pitcher	H.B. Plant High School (FL)
40	Nathan Kirby	Milwaukee Brewers	Left-handed pitcher	Virginia
41	Austin Riley	Atlanta Braves (Note: The Braves acquired the 41st pick from the San Diego Padres along with Carlos Quentin, Cameron Maybin, Matt Wisler, and Jordan Paroubeck in exchange for Craig Kimbrel and Melvin Upton, Jr.)	Third baseman	DeSoto Central High School (MS)
42	Triston McKenzie	Cleveland Indians	Right-handed pitcher	Royal Palm Beach High School (FL)

== Other notable selections ==
Round	Pick	Player	Team	Position	School
2	43	Alex Young	Arizona Diamondbacks	Left-handed pitcher	TCU
2	44	Peter Lambert	Colorado Rockies	Right-handed pitcher	San Dimas High School (CA)
2	46	Tom Eshelman	Houston Astros	Right-handed pitcher	Cal State Fullerton
2	47	Donnie Dewees	Chicago Cubs	Outfielder	North Florida
2	48	Scott Kingery	Philadelphia Phillies	Infielder	Arizona
2	55	Cody Ponce	Milwaukee Brewers	Right-handed pitcher	Cal Poly Pomona
2	56	Brady Singer*	Toronto Blue Jays	Right-handed pitcher	Eustis High School (FL)
2	58	Andrew Stevenson	Washington Nationals	Outfielder	LSU
2	60	Nick Neidert	Seattle Mariners	Right-handed pitcher	Peachtree Ridge High School (GA)
2	61	Andrew Suarez	San Francisco Giants	Left-handed pitcher	Miami
2	62	Kevin Kramer	Pittsburgh Pirates	Second baseman	UCLA
2	64	Josh Staumont	Kansas City Royals	Right-handed pitcher	Azusa Pacific
2	65	Tyler Alexander	Detroit Tigers	Left-handed pitcher	TCU
2	69	Blake Perkins	Washington Nationals	Outfielder	Verrado High School (AZ)
2	70	Jahmai Jones	Los Angeles Angels	Outfielder	Wesleyan School (GA)
2	71	Tanner Rainey	Cincinnati Reds	Right-handed pitcher	West Alabama
2	72	Andrew Moore	Seattle Mariners	Right-handed pitcher	Oregon State
2	73	Kyle Cody*	Minnesota Twins	Right-handed pitcher	Kentucky
2	74	Josh Sborz	Los Angeles Dodgers (Note: The Dodgers acquired the 74th pick, Ryan Webb, and Brian Ward from the Baltimore Orioles in exchange for Ben Rowen and Chris O'Brien.)	Right-handed pitcher	Virginia
2	75	A. J. Minter	Atlanta Braves (Note: The Braves acquired the 75th pick from the Arizona Diamondbacks in exchange for Víctor Reyes.)	Left-handed pitcher	Texas A&M
3	76	Taylor Clarke	Arizona Diamondbacks	Right-handed pitcher	College of Charleston
3	78	Michael Matuella	Texas Rangers	Right-handed pitcher	Duke
3	80	Travis Blankenhorn	Minnesota Twins	Third baseman	Pottsville Area High School (PA)
3	83	Luke Williams	Philadelphia Phillies	Shortstop	Dana Hills High School (CA)
3	84	Blake Trahan	Cincinnati Reds	Shortstop	Louisiana-Lafayette
3	86	Jacob Nix	San Diego Padres	Right-handed pitcher	IMG Academy (FL)
3	87	Brandon Lowe	Tampa Bay Rays	Second baseman	Maryland
3	91	Justin Maese	Toronto Blue Jays	Right-handed pitcher	Ysleta High School (TX)
3	93	Mark Mathias	Cleveland Indians	Second baseman	Cal Poly
3	94	Braden Bishop	Seattle Mariners	Center fielder	Washington
3	99	Drew Smith	Detroit Tigers	Right-handed pitcher	Dallas Baptist
3	100	Harrison Bader	St. Louis Cardinals	Outfielder	Florida
3	101	Philip Pfeifer	Los Angeles Dodgers	Left-handed pitcher	Vanderbilt
3	103	Rhett Wiseman	Washington Nationals	Outfielder	Vanderbilt
3	104	Grayson Long	Los Angeles Angels	Right-handed pitcher	Texas A&M
3	105	Jordan Hicks	St. Louis Cardinals	Right-handed pitcher	Cypress Creek High School (TX)
4	111	Tate Matheny	Boston Red Sox	Outfielder	Missouri State
4	114	Kyle Martin	Philadelphia Phillies	First baseman	South Carolina
4	116	Cody Poteet	Miami Marlins	Right-handed pitcher	UCLA
4	117	Austin Allen	San Diego Padres	Catcher	Florida Tech
4	119	David Thompson	New York Mets	Third baseman	Miami
4	121	Demi Orimoloye	Milwaukee Brewers	Outfielder	St. Matthew High School (ON)
4	126	Mac Marshall	San Francisco Giants	Left-handed pitcher	Chipola
4	128	Skye Bolt	Oakland Athletics	Outfielder	North Carolina
4	131	Paul DeJong	St. Louis Cardinals	Infielder	Illinois State
4	132	Willie Calhoun	Los Angeles Dodgers	Second baseman	Yavapai
4	133	Ryan McKenna	Baltimore Orioles	Outfielder	St. Thomas Aquinas High School (NH)
4	134	Mariano Rivera III	Washington Nationals	Right-handed pitcher	Iona
5	136	Ryan Burr	Arizona Diamondbacks	Right-handed pitcher	Arizona State
5	139	Trent Thornton	Houston Astros	Right-handed pitcher	North Carolina
5	144	Bailey Falter	Philadelphia Phillies	Left-handed pitcher	Chino Hills High School (CA)
5	148	Joe McCarthy	Tampa Bay Rays	Outfielder	Virginia
5	149	Thomas Szapucki	New York Mets	Left-handed pitcher	William T. Dwyer High School (FL)
5	153	Chance Adams	New York Yankees	Right-handed pitcher	Dallas Baptist
5	154	Ka'ai Tom	Cleveland Indians	Outfielder	Kentucky
5	155	Drew Jackson	Seattle Mariners	Shortstop	Stanford
5	157	Brandon Waddell	Pittsburgh Pirates	Left-handed pitcher	Virginia
5	161	Ryan Helsley	St. Louis Cardinals	Right-handed pitcher	Northeastern State
5	164	Taylor Hearn	Washington Nationals	Left-handed pitcher	Oklahoma Baptist
6	171	Travis Lakins	Boston Red Sox	Right-handed pitcher	Ohio State
6	173	David Berg	Chicago Cubs	Right-handed pitcher	UCLA
6	175	Jimmy Herget	Cincinnati Reds	Right-handed pitcher	South Florida
6	181	Eric Hanhold	Milwaukee Brewers	Right-handed pitcher	Florida
6	186	Steven Duggar	San Francisco Giants	Outfielder	Clemson
6	187	JT Brubaker	Pittsburgh Pirates	Right-handed pitcher	Akron
6	190	Matt Hall	Detroit Tigers	Left-handed pitcher	Missouri State
6	192	Edwin Ríos	Los Angeles Dodgers	First baseman	FIU
6	196	David Fletcher	Los Angeles Angels	Shortstop	Loyola Marymount
7	198	Dylan Moore	Texas Rangers	Shortstop	UCF
7	201	Ben Taylor	Boston Red Sox	Right-handed pitcher	South Alabama
7	207	Trevor Megill	San Diego Padres	Right Hand Pitcher	Los Angeles
7	208	Jake Cronenworth	Tampa Bay Rays	Second baseman	Michigan
7	210	Patrick Weigel	Atlanta Braves	Right-handed pitcher	Houston
7	212	Travis Bergen	Toronto Blue Jays	Left-handed pitcher	Kennesaw State
7	222	Andrew Sopko	Los Angeles Dodgers	Right-handed pitcher	Gonzaga
7	223	Gray Fenter	Baltimore Orioles	Pitcher	West Memphis High School (AR)
8	229	Garrett Stubbs	Houston Astros	Catcher	USC
8	231	Logan Allen	Boston Red Sox	Left-handed pitcher	IMG Academy (FL)
8	236	Chris Paddack	Miami Marlins	Right-handed pitcher	Cedar Park High School (TX)
8	243	Donny Sands	New York Yankees	Catcher	Salpointe Catholic High School (AZ)
8	254	Koda Glover	Washington Nationals	Right-handed pitcher	Oklahoma State
9	258	Pete Fairbanks	Texas Rangers	Right-handed pitcher	Missouri
9	260	LaMonte Wade	Minnesota Twins	Outfielder	Maryland
9	269	Kevin Kaczmarski	New York Mets	Outfielder	Evansville
10	293	Vimael Machin	Chicago Cubs	Shortstop	VCU
10	303	James Reeves	New York Yankees	Left-handed pitcher	The Citadel
10	314	Taylor Guilbeau	Washington Nationals	Left-handed pitcher	Alabama
11	318	Scott Heineman	Texas Rangers	Outfielder	Oregon
11	319	Patrick Sandoval	Houston Astros	Left-handed pitcher	Mission Viejo High School (CA)
11	327	Brett Kennedy	San Diego Padres	Right-handed pitcher	Fordham
11	328	Ian Gibaut	Tampa Bay Rays	Right-handed pitcher	Tulane
11	333	Josh Rogers	New York Yankees	Left-handed pitcher	Louisville
12	349	Myles Straw	Houston Astros	Outfielder	St. Johns River State College
12	352	Seby Zavala	Chicago White Sox	Catcher	San Diego State
12	353	P. J. Higgins	Chicago Cubs	Catcher	Old Dominion
12	355	Alexis Diaz	Cincinnati Reds	Right-handed pitcher	Juan José Maunez High School (PR)
12	370	Kyle Dowdy	Detroit Tigers	Right-handed pitcher	Hawaii
13	378	Curtis Terry	Texas Rangers	First baseman	Archer High School (GA)
13	381	Matt Kent	Boston Red Sox	Pitcher	Texas A&M
13	403	Cedric Mullins	Baltimore Orioles	Outfielder	Campbell
13	404	Max Schrock	Washington Nationals	Second baseman	South Carolina
14	411	Bobby Poyner	Boston Red Sox	Left-handed pitcher	Florida
14	429	Nick Dini	Kansas City Royals	Catcher	Wagner
14	430	A. J. Simcox	Detroit Tigers	Shortstop	Tennessee
15	449	P. J. Conlon	New York Mets	Pitcher	San Diego
16	468	Tyler Phillips	Texas Rangers	Right-handed pitcher	Bishop Eustace Preparatory School (NJ)
17	507	Trey Wingenter	San Diego Padres	Right-handed pitcher	Auburn
17	510	Evan Phillips	Atlanta Braves	Right-handed pitcher	UNC Wilmington
18	536	Kyle Keller	Miami Marlins	Right-handed pitcher	Southeastern Louisiana
19	578	Seth Brown	Oakland Athletics	First baseman	Lewis-Clark State College
19	580	Cam Vieaux*	Detroit Tigers	Left-handed pitcher	Michigan State
20	607	Tanner Anderson	Pittsburgh Pirates	Right-handed pitcher	Harvard
21	632	Tayler Saucedo	Toronto Blue Jays	Left-handed pitcher	Tennessee Wesleyan
22	649	Cole Sands*	Houston Astros	Right-handed pitcher	North Florida Christian School (FL)
22	663	Cody Carroll	New York Yankees	Right-handed pitcher	Southern Miss
23	694	Chad Smith*	Cleveland Indians	Pitcher	Wallace State Community College
23	695	Art Warren	Seattle Mariners	Right-handed pitcher	Ashland
24	724	Sam Haggerty	Cleveland Indians	Second baseman	New Mexico
25	738	Demarcus Evans	Texas Rangers	Right-handed pitcher	Petal High School (MS)
25	752	Ryan Feltner*	Toronto Blue Jays	Right-handed pitcher	Walsh Jesuit High School (OH)
26	769	Ralph Garza Jr.	Colorado Rockies	Right-handed pitcher	Oklahoma
26	771	Kevin Ginkel*	Boston Red Sox	Right-handed pitcher	Southwestern College (CA)
26	779	Shane McClanahan*	New York Mets	Left-handed pitcher	Cape Coral High School (FL)
26	781	Jonathan India*	Milwaukee Brewers	Shortstop	American Heritage High School (FL)
26	785	Ljay Newsome	Seattle Mariners	Right-handed pitcher	Chopticon High School (MD)
27	805	Alejo López	Cincinnati Reds	Shortstop	Greenway High School (AZ)
27	808	Joey Bart*	Tampa Bay Rays	Catcher	Buford High School (GA)
27	824	Ryan Brinley	Washington Nationals	Right-handed pitcher	Sam Houston State
28	829	Zac Grotz	Houston Astros	Right-handed pitcher	Embry–Riddle
28	852	Kyle Garlick	Los Angeles Dodgers	Outfielder	Cal Poly Pomona
29	871	Donny Everett*	Milwaukee Brewers	Right-handed pitcher	Clarksville High School (TN)
29	882	Jason Bilous*	Los Angeles Dodgers	Right-handed pitcher	Caravel Academy (DE)
30	888	Jeffrey Springs	Texas Rangers	Left-handed pitcher	Appalachian State
30	893	Tyler Payne	Chicago Cubs	Catcher	West Virginia State
31	920	Tristan Pompey*	Minnesota Twins	Outfielder	Jean Vanier Catholic Secondary School (ON)
31	921	Nick Duron	Boston Red Sox	Right-handed pitcher	Clark College
31	924	Nick Fanti	Philadelphia Phillies	Left-handed pitcher	Hauppauge High School (NY)
31	926	Griffin Conine*	Miami Marlins	Outfielder	Pine Crest High School (FL)
31	929	Tanner Dodson*	New York Mets	Left-handed pitcher	Jesuit High School (CA)
31	933	Hobie Harris	New York Yankees	Right-handed pitcher	Pittsburgh
31	937	Riley Smith*	Pittsburgh Pirates	Right-handed pitcher	San Jacinto College
32	946	Bryan Hoeing*	Arizona Diamondbacks	Right-handed pitcher	Batesville High School (IN)
32	950	Andrew Vasquez	Minnesota Twins	Left-handed pitcher	Westmont
32	967	Cole Irvin*	Pittsburgh Pirates	Left-handed pitcher	Oregon
32	973	Cody Morris*	Baltimore Orioles	Right-handed pitcher	Reservoir High School (MD)
33	978	C. D. Pelham	Texas Rangers	Left-handed pitcher	Spartanburg Methodist College
34	1,017	Ty France	San Diego Padres	First Baseman	San Diego State
35	1,039	Kody Clemens*	Houston Astros	Shortstop	Memorial High School (TX)
35	1,043	Taylor Jones*	Chicago Cubs	First baseman	Gonzaga
35	1,064	Coco Montes*	Washington Nationals	Shortstop	Coral Gables Senior High School (FL)
36	1,071	Trevor Kelley	Boston Red Sox	Right-handed pitcher	North Carolina
37	1,099	Luken Baker*	Houston Astros	Right-handed pitcher	Oak Ridge High School (TX)
37	1,100	Jake Irvin*	Minnesota Twins	Right-handed pitcher	Jefferson High School (MN)
37	1,106	Ruben Cardenas*	Miami Marlins	Outfielder	Bishop Alemany High School (CA)
37	1,109	Geoff Hartlieb*	New York Mets	Right-handed pitcher	Lindenwood
37	1,112	Randy Labaut*	Toronto Blue Jays	Left-handed pitcher	Downey High School (CA)
37	1,117	Eli White*	Pittsburgh Pirates	Shortstop	Clemson
38	1,130	Alex McKenna*	Minnesota Twins	Outfielder	Bishop Alemany High School (CA)
38	1,144	Braden Webb*	Cleveland Indians	Pitcher	South Carolina
39	1,160	Daniel Tillo*	Minnesota Twins	Left-handed pitcher	North High School (IA)
39	1,167	Adam Hill*	San Diego Padres	Right-hand pitcher	T. L. Hanna High School (SC)
39	1,170	Jeremy Peña*	Atlanta Braves	Shortstop	Classical High School (RI)
39	1,174	Tristin English*	Cleveland Indians	Right-handed pitcher	Pike County High School (GA)
39	1,185	Jared Walsh	Los Angeles Angels	First baseman	Georgia
40	1,207	Daniel Zamora	Pittsburgh Pirates	Pitcher	Stony Brook
40	1,208	Nick Maton*	Oakland Athletics	Shortstop	Glenwood High School (IL)

== See also ==
- List of first overall Major League Baseball draft picks

== Notes ==
Compensation picks

Trades
