= Searching for Closure =

Searching for Closure may refer to:

- "Searching for Closure", a song by Farrah Abraham from My Teenage Dream Ended
- "Searching for Closure", a photograph collection of Perućac lake
