= Council Bluffs Community School District =

School district in Iowa

Coordinates: 41.262542°N 95.847931°W

Location
- Council Bluffs, Iowa Pottawattamie County United States
- Coordinates: 41.262542, -95.847931

District information
- Type: Local school district
- Grades: K-12
- Superintendent: Chace Ramey
- Schools: 15
- Budget: $150,788,000 (2020-21)
- NCES District ID: 1908220

Students and staff
- Students: 8784 (2022-23)
- Teachers: 587.14 FTE
- Staff: 670.53 FTE
- Student–teacher ratio: 14.96
- Athletic conference: Missouri River

Other information
- Website: www.cb-schools.org

The Council Bluffs Community School District is a public school district headquartered in the city of Council Bluffs, Iowa, United States.

The district serves most of the city of Council Bluffs and the cities of Carter Lake and Crescent.

== Schools ==
All campuses are located in the city of Council Bluffs unless otherwise noted.

=== Senior high schools ===
- Abraham Lincoln High School
- Thomas Jefferson High School

=== Middle schools ===
- Kirn Middle School
- Woodrow Wilson Middle School

=== Elementary schools ===
- Amelia Bloomer Elementary School
- Carter Lake Elementary School (Carter Lake)
- College View Elementary School
- Thomas Edison Elementary School
- Benjamin Franklin Elementary School
- Herbert Hoover Elementary School
- Lewis & Clark Elementary School
- Longfellow Elementary School
- Theodore Roosevelt Elementary School
- James B. Rue Elementary School

=== Other campuses ===
- Kanesville Alternative Learning Center
- Anne E. Nelson Early Learning Center
- Tucker Career & College Center

== Student demographics ==
The following figures are as of February 2009.

- Total District Enrollment: 9,246
- Student enrollment by gender
  - Female: 4,520 (48.89%)
  - Male: 4,726 (51.11%)
- Student enrollment by ethnicity
  - White: 7,672 (82.98%)
  - Hispanic: 1,070 (11.57%)
  - African American: 338 (3.66%)
  - Asian: 87 (0.94%)
  - Native American: 79 (0.85%)

== See also ==
- List of school districts in Iowa
