= Mac Marshall =

American baseball player (born 1996)

- Pitcher
- Born: January 27, 1996 (age 29); Lilburn, Georgia, U.S.
- Bats: Right Throws: Left
Medals
Men's baseball
Representing United States
18U Baseball World Cup
Gold medal – first place	2013 Taichung	Team

John MacGregor "Mac" Marshall (born January 27, 1996) is an American former professional baseball pitcher.

== Career ==
Marshall attended Parkview High School in Lilburn, Georgia. He committed to attend Louisiana State University (LSU) to play college baseball for the LSU Tigers.

Though Marshall was considered one of the best available prospects in the 2014 Major League Baseball draft, his signing bonus demands led him to fall lower in the draft. The Houston Astros selected Marshall in the 21st round. The Astros reached Marshall's demand of a $1.5 million signing bonus. However, when the Astros' deal with Brady Aiken fell through due to problems with Aiken's medical exam, the Astros were unable to sign Marshall and Jacob Nix without incurring penalties. Marshall decided not to attend LSU, instead choosing to attend Chipola College (a junior college), making him eligible for the 2015 MLB draft.

Marshall consented to allow the Astros to select him in 2015; however, the San Francisco Giants selected him in the fourth round (126th overall selection). Marshall signed with the Giants, receiving a $750,000 signing bonus. He pitched in two games for the Arizona Giants of the Rookie-level Arizona League, and was promoted to the Salem-Keizer Volcanoes of the Low-A Northwest League. In nine games between Arizona and Salem-Keizer in 2015, Marshall posted a 5.23 earned run average (ERA), striking out 29 in 20 2/3 innings. He spent 2016 with both Salem-Keizer and the Augusta GreenJackets of the Single-A South Atlantic League, posting a combined 1–6 record, with a 4.70 ERA in 17 starts. In 2017, Marshall only pitched 1 2/3 innings, for the Arizona Giants, due to surgery to repair an ulnar nerve subluxation. In 2018, he pitched for the San Jose Giants of the High-A California League, going 0-6 with a 5.43 ERA and a 1.54 WHIP in 19 games (18 starts).

In 9 games split between San Jose and the AZL Giants in 2019, Marshall registered a neat 1.93 ERA with 14 strikeouts in 14.0 innings pitched. He did not play in a game in 2020 due to the cancellation of the minor league season because of the COVID-19 pandemic. Marshall spent the 2021 season with the Double-A Richmond Flying Squirrels, struggling to a 10.13 ERA with 22 strikeouts in 16.0 innings pitched. On August 3, 2021, Marshall retired from professional baseball.
