= Thomas Fidone =

American football player (born 2002)

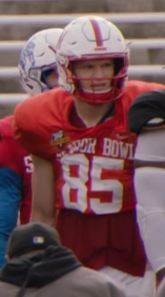
- Fidone at the 2025 Senior Bowl

No. 86 – New York Giants
- Position: Tight end
- Roster status: Active

Personal information
- Born: September 20, 2002 (age 24); Council Bluffs, Iowa, U.S.
- Listed height: 6 ft 6 in (1.98 m)
- Listed weight: 255 lb (116 kg)

Career information
- High school: Lewis Central (Council Bluffs, Iowa)
- College: Nebraska (2021–2024)
- NFL draft: 2025: 7th round, 219th overall pick

Career history
- New York Giants (2025–present)
- Stats at Pro Football Reference

Thomas Fidone II (born September 20, 2002) is an American professional football tight end for the New York Giants of the National Football League (NFL). He played college football for the Nebraska Cornhuskers and was selected by the Giants in the seventh round of the 2025 NFL draft.

== Early life ==
Fidone attended Lewis Central High School in Council Bluffs, Iowa. He was rated as a four-star recruit, the 2nd overall tight end, and the 92nd overall player in the class of 2021, and committed to play college football for the Nebraska Cornhuskers over offers from Iowa, LSU, Michigan among others.

== College career ==
As a freshman in 2021, Fidone played one game before missing the entire 2022 season due to injury. In 2023, he had 25 receptions for 260 yards and four touchdowns. Heading into the 2024 season, Fidone was named to the John Mackey Award watchlist. In week 5 of the 2024 season, he recorded three receptions for 39 yards in a win over Purdue. In week 7, Fidone recorded six receptions for 91 yards against Indiana.

== Professional career ==
Pre-draft measurables
Height	Weight	Arm length	Hand span	Wingspan	40-yard dash	10-yard split	20-yard split	20-yard shuttle	Three-cone drill	Vertical jump	Broad jump
6 ft 5 in (1.96 m)	243 lb (110 kg)	34 in (0.86 m)	10 5/8 in (0.27 m)	6 ft 10 5/8 in (2.10 m)	4.70 s	1.57 s	2.74 s	4.29 s	7.01 s	35.5 in (0.90 m)	10 ft 6 in (3.20 m)
All values from NFL Combine

Fidone was selected by the New York Giants with the 219th pick in the seventh round of the 2025 NFL draft. On November 22, 2025, Fidone was placed on injured reserve due to a foot injury that had plagued him during the year.
