= Alex McKenna (baseball) =

American baseball player (born 1997)

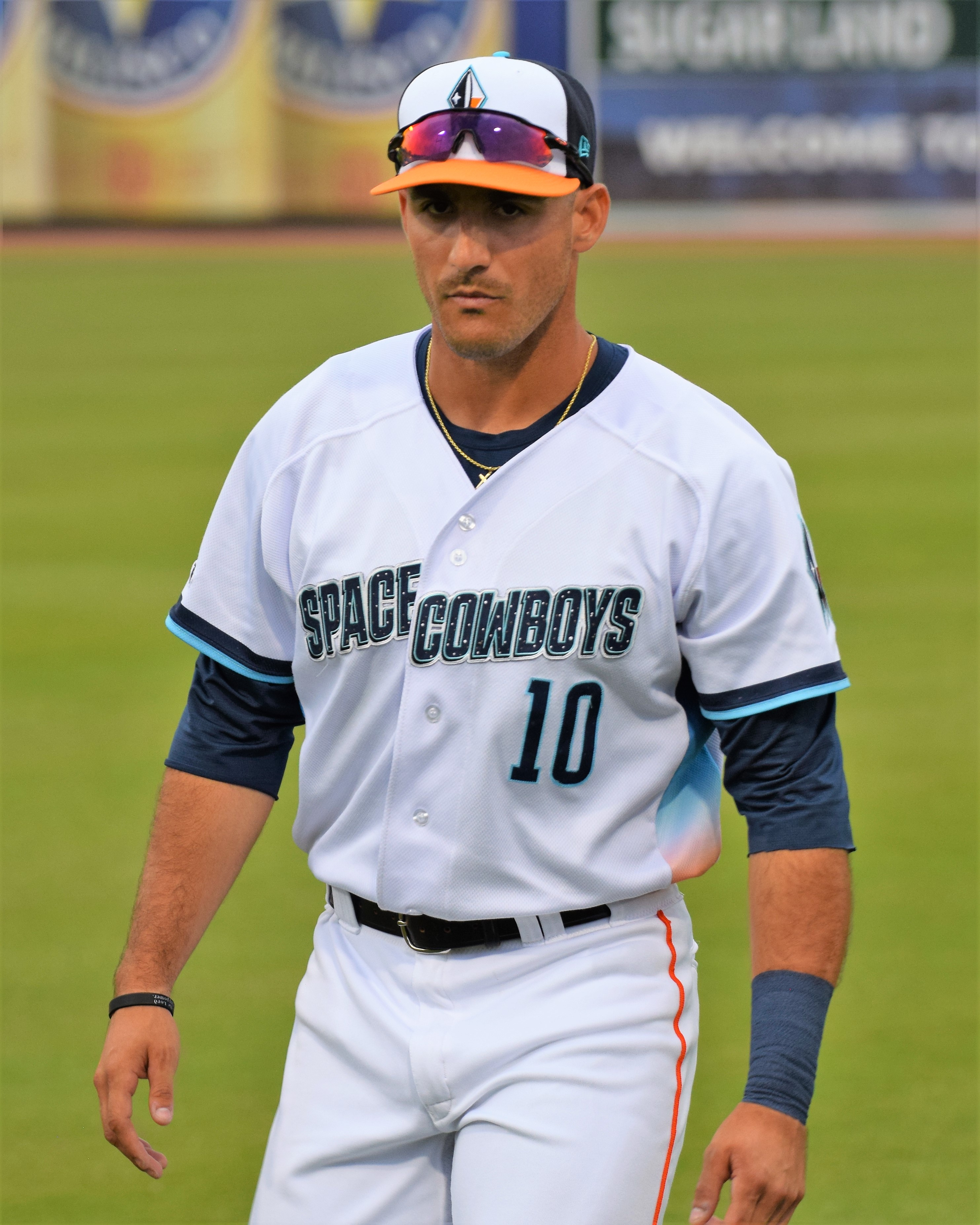
- McKenna in 2022 with the Sugar Land Space Cowboys
- Outfielder
- Born: September 6, 1997 (age 28); Lancaster, California, U.S.
- Bats: Right Throws: Right

Alexander McKenna (born September 6, 1997) is an American former professional baseball outfielder.

== Amateur career ==
McKenna attended Bishop Alemany High School in Mission Hills, California, where he played football, basketball, and baseball. In 2015, as a senior, he batted .402. He was drafted by the Minnesota Twins in the 38th round of the 2015 Major League Baseball draft, but did not sign, instead choosing to attend California Polytechnic State University where he played college baseball for the Cal Poly Mustangs.

As a freshman at Cal Poly in 2016, McKenna batted .261 with six home runs in 45 games. After the season, he played for the Eau Claire Express of the Northwoods League. In 2017, as a sophomore, he started all 56 of Cal Poly's games and compiled a .360 batting average with five home runs, 31 RBIs, 13 steals, 45 runs scored, 11 doubles, and two triples. He was named to the All-Big West First Team after the season. That summer he played in the Cape Cod Baseball League for the Yarmouth–Dennis Red Sox where he batted .298 with nine doubles, 16 RBIs, and seven stolen bases in 124 at-bats, and was named a league all-star. In 2018, as a junior, McKenna batted .339 with five home runs, 31 RBIs, and a .930 OPS in 57 games. He was named the 2018 Big West Field Player of the Year along with being named to the All-Big West First Team for the second straight year.

== Professional career ==
McKenna was selected by the Houston Astros in the fourth round, with the 132nd overall selection, of the 2018 Major League Baseball draft and signed for $432,500. He made his professional debut that year for the Tri-City ValleyCats of the Low–A New York–Penn League and was named an All-Star. He was promoted to the Quad Cities River Bandits of the Single–A Midwest League in August. Over 44 games between Tri-City and Quad Cities, McKenna hit .311/.394/.512 with seven home runs and 28 RBI. In 2019, McKenna returned to Quad Cities, but played in only 65 games due to injury; over those games, he batted .252/.327/.303 with one home run and 20 RBI.

McKenna did not play a game in 2020 due to the cancellation of the minor league season because of the COVID-19 pandemic. To begin the 2021 season, he was assigned to the Asheville Tourists of the High-A East. He was promoted to the Corpus Christi Hooks of the Double-A Central in late June. He missed nearly a month due to injury. Over 79 games between the two teams, he slashed .261/.356/.478 with 15 home runs and 46 RBI. He was assigned to the Sugar Land Space Cowboys of the Triple-A Pacific Coast League to begin the 2022 season, but was demoted to Corpus Christi in mid-June. He played a total of 106 games between both teams, slashing .232/.337/.351 with six home runs, 51 RBI, and 16 stolen bases.

McKenna started the 2023 season for Double–A Corpus Christi. Over 16 games, he slashed .196/.338/.339. He was assigned to the Sugar Land Space Cowboys of the Triple-A Pacific Coast League on April 29, 2023. In 46 total games split between the two affiliates, he hit .212/.324/.338 with 4 home runs and 21 RBI. On July 27, McKenna was released by the Astros organization.

On April 5, 2024, McKenna announced his retirement from professional baseball.
