= Marjabelle Young Stewart =

American writer

- Born: May 16, 1924; Council Bluffs, Iowa
- Died: March 3, 2007 (aged 82); Kewanee, Illinois

Marjabelle Young Stewart (May 16, 1924 – March 3, 2007) was an American writer and expert on etiquette.

== Early life ==
Stewart was born in Council Bluffs, Iowa, to Marie and Clarence Cullen Bryant (a great-grandson of poet William Cullen Bryant). She and her three sisters lived in an orphanage after her parents divorced, where her youngest sister died of a mastoid infection at age 2. After her mother remarried, they returned to live with her. She attended Thomas Jefferson High School in Council Bluffs. After graduating, at the age of 17, she married scientist Jack Davison Young and moved to Washington, D.C. in 1941. She worked in a naval yard before taking up modelling.

== Career ==
Young became one of Washington's top models and created her own agency in partnership with two other women. When she met the humor columnist Art Buchwald, he suggested a co-partnership with his wife in writing a book about etiquette. Stewart collaborated with Ann Buchwald on two other joint books and then she started writing her own.

She went on to teach etiquette and manners to children, including Richard M. Nixon's daughters, and Dwight D. Eisenhower's granddaughter and President Johnson's daughters. Her husband started a business to teach etiquette training and Stewart began teaching classes for professionals and college students. She went to class equipped with a complete place setting that included china, 10 pieces of silverware, five different sizes of crystal glasses, and "a silver salt cellar with accompanying shell-shaped spoon".

She moved to Kewanee, Illinois in 1965 after her divorce from Mr. Young and remarriage to attorney William E. Stewart. She created a network of etiquette classes, which at its height had locations in several hundred U.S. cities. These classes were called White Gloves (for girls) and Blue Blazers (for boys); they usually ran in cooperation with department stores. She wrote fifteen books on etiquette including, Marjabelle Stewart's Book of Modern Table Manners (1981), Can My Bridesmaids Wear Black? And 325 Other Most Asked Questions (1989), and Executive Etiquette in the New Workplace (1996).

In 1977, she began issuing an annual list of best-mannered cities. Cities like Savannah, Georgia, Madison, Wisconsin, and New York often appeared in the list.

After a car accident on June 30, 1997, Stewart was charged with a DUI.

Stewart died of pneumonia at a Kewanee, Illinois nursing home, at the age of 82.

== Published works ==
- The Complete Wedding Planner: 2nd Revised Edition, The Essential Guide to Planning Every Phase of Your Wedding (2002). Publisher: St. Martin's Griffin; 2nd Rev edition, ISBN 0312277113
- Commonsense Etiquette: A Guide to Gracious, Simple Manners for the Twenty-First Century (1999). Publisher: St. Martin's Griffin; 1st edition, ISBN 0312242948
- The New Etiquette: Real Manners for Real People in Real Situations--An A-to-Z Guide (1997). Publisher: St. Martin's Griffin, ISBN 0312156022
- Executive Etiquette: In the New Workplace (1995). Publisher: St. Martin's Griffin; St Martin's Griffin ed edition, ISBN 0312141033
- Little Ways To Say I Love You: Dozens of Simple Ways To Show Spouses, Lovers, Children, and Friends How Special They Are (1992). St. Martin's Griffin, ISBN 0312072376
- Can My Bridesmaids Wear Black?-- And 325 Other Most-Asked Etiquette Questions (1989). Publisher: St Martins Pr; 1 edition, ISBN 0312033001
- What to Do When and Why: At School, at Parties, at Home, in Your Growing World (1988). Publisher: Robert B Luce, ISBN 0883311054
- Executive Etiquette: How to Make Your Way to the Top With Grace and Style by Marjabelle Young Stewart (1986-01-01) (1986). Publisher: St Martins Pr (1626), ASIN: B01K3K2UUY
- The Teen Girl's Beauty Guide to Total Color Success (1986). Publisher: Signet Vista Books, ISBN 0451144538.
- How Travl 4 Yng People (1985). Publisher: Random House Children's Books, ISBN 0679512071
- Marjabelle Stewart's Book of Modern Table Manners (1981). Publisher: St Martins Pr; First Printing edition, ISBN 031251526X
- New Etiquette Guide to Getting Married Again (1981). Publisher: Avon, ISBN 0380551861
- Looking Pretty, Feeling Fine (1979). Publisher: Scholastic; First edition, ISBN 0590312324
- Your Complete Wedding Planner (1977). Publisher: David McKay Co; 7th Printing edition, ISBN 0679508139
