= Tom Knudson =

American journalist (born 1953)

- Born: Thomas Jeffrey Knudson; July 6, 1953 (age 72); Manning, Iowa, U.S.
- Education: Iowa State University (BA)
- Occupation: Journalist
- Notable work: "The Sierra in Peril"
- Awards: Pulitzer Prize (2)

Thomas "Tom" Jeffrey Knudson (born 6 July 1953) is an American journalist and a two-time Pulitzer Prize winner in 1985 and 1992.

== Biography ==
Thomas Jeffrey Knudson was born 6 July 1953 in the city of Manning in Carroll County, Iowa. He attended Thomas Jefferson High School in Council Bluffs, Iowa, graduating the class of 1971. In 1980, he graduated with a B.A. degree in journalism from Iowa State University (ISU).

After graduation in June 1980, Knudson joined The Des Moines Register as a full-time journalist. And later becoming the lead for the Iowa City news journal for The Des Moines Register.

In 1985, Knudson created a series of articles published in The Des Moines Register that examined the occupational dangers of farming, including high cancer rates and machinery-related accidents. A number of his family members were farmers in the Manning-area, and when he was a boy, his cousin had been run over by a tractor. This article won him the 1985 Pulitzer Prize for National Reporting.

Knudson's' "The Sierra in Peril," article was published in The Sacramento Bee which looked in depth at the environmental issues in the Sierra Nevada mountain range in California. He won the 1992 Pulitzer Prize for Public Service for this article.
