= Nina Korgan =

American female softball pitcher (1916–2009)

Nina Korgan (February 1, 1916—July 19, 2009) was a right-handed women’s fast-pitch softball pitcher in the 1930s and 1940s, possibly the most dominant women’s fast-pitch softball pitcher of all time. Nicknamed “Tiger,” she stood 5’ 10” and weighed 165 pounds (at least one source said 5’ 11", 180 pounds), and pitched at the top of the elite tier of national amateur women’s softball from 1935 to 1948.

== Early life and career ==
Nina Teresa Korgan was born in Pottawatamie, Iowa to Fred J. Korgan, a farmer and thresher, and Nina Olga (Rupenkamp) Korgan. In an era when extramural women’s sports were not available in high schools, Korgan was an all-around athlete from a young age, playing volleyball, basketball, baseball, soccer, captain ball, and tennis at Abraham Lincoln High School in Council Bluffs, Iowa. She was also the city champion in the baseball “far throw,” high jump, and broad jump, and captained the city championship girls’ basketball team. In her high school yearbook, she was dubbed “Babe Didrickson the second.” After graduation in 1934, she pitched 49 straight wins for the Georgie Porgies, a local softball team. On one occasion she also pitched five innings for the men’s Hughes Motor baseball club in Council Bluffs against the Omaha City Merchants, giving up only one earned run and scoring three runs as the leadoff batter. During the winter of 1935, she played forward with a couple of men’s basketball teams, the Council Bluffs Merchants and Hal McKain’s Sportsmen.

Korgan joined the women’s amateur fast-pitch softball circuit in 1935, pitching for the Syracuse (Nebraska) Bluebirds alongside teammate Marjorie Dickey, a power-hitting second baseman who would become the mother of Vice President Dick Cheney. Korgan pitched at least one no-hitter in her first season with the Bluebirds, and led the Bluebirds to the Nebraska state championships three years in a row, earning berths each year in the Amateur Softball Association women’s national championship tournament. The Bluebirds placed fifth at the national tournament in 1935, third in 1936, and ninth in 1937. Her overall record with the Bluebirds over three years was 95-5. In 1938 and 1939, Korgan pitched for the Thames Pony Girls of St. Joseph, Missouri, going 3-1 and pitching 18 strikeouts in 12 innings in her final losing effort in the 1939 national tournament as the Pony Girls finished tied for third place. Korgan joined the Higgins Midgets of Tulsa, Oklahoma in 1940, setting a championship tournament record by striking out 20 batters against the Keller Girls of Detroit before Higgins finished the tournament tied for fifth place. While pitching for Higgins, when she was not on the mound Korgan worked on an assembly line making precision parts for parking meters in Tulsa.

== National championship years ==
At age 25 in 1941, Korgan began an unprecedented run of success in the women’s national championships that lasted for seven years. That year she led Higgins to the women’s amateur softball championship over the Erin Brews of Cleveland, Ohio after striking out 18 batters in a game against the Toronto Simpsons and pitching a 20-strikeout perfect game against Eline Chevrolet of Louisville, Kentucky earlier in the tournament. Over the course of the 1941 tournament, she pitched four consecutive shutouts, with a total of 67 strikeouts. After the championship, Korgan pitched a 12-0 exhibition game against an all-star team from the Lower Rio Grande Valley in October 1941, dramatically retiring the side with two consecutive strikeouts in the last inning after sending all her fielders to the bench.

In both the 1940 and 1941 tournaments, Korgan sat across the diamond from Sonny Berger, the star pitcher of the Jax Brewery Maids of New Orleans, who would later go on to become one of the best pitchers in the All-American Girls Professional Baseball League. Following the 1941 season, the Higgins Midgets folded and Korgan was recruited to the Jax Brewery Maids, one of the strongest teams in the country. The Amateur Athletic Union, which sanctioned amateur women’s fast-pitch softball, forbade players to be paid, so Korgan went to work with Jax Brewery of New Orleans while she pitched for the company team. In her first season with the Brewery Maids, in 1942 she beat Sonny Berger’s new club, the Garden City Maids of Chicago, 4-1 in the championship final, allowing only one run in 58 innings of tournament play over the prior two years and leading the Brewery Maids to their first national title. In the 1943 championship final, she pitched a one-hitter and drove in two runs to beat the Phoenix Ramblers for her third straight championship final win. The Brewery Maids ended the 1943 season with a 62-6 record.

By 1943, Korgan was being called “the Walter Johnson of girl softball” in sports pages across the country. She was offered a contract, along with her teammates in New Orleans, to play in the All-American Girls Professional Baseball League for salaries ranging from $65 to more than $100 per week, but all fifteen teammates turned the League down; the Brewery Maids were the best team in women’s softball, and none of them wanted to break it up. Nonetheless, they endured a tough 1944 season. Unable to find suitable challengers for much of the summer, they played mostly men’s military base teams, finishing the regular season with a record of 30-5 against men’s teams and 14-3 against women’s teams behind Korgan’s pitching. In the 1944 national tournament, the Jax Brewery Maids were eliminated early and finished thirteenth, breaking their two-year run of championships.

Korgan and her team came back in 1945, beating the Crofton Athletic Club of Toronto to win the national title again. Korgan went 3-0 for the tournament, with one save, three shutouts including one no-hitter, with 28 strikeouts in 22 innings. In the 1946 tournament, the Brewery Maids beat the Chicago Matchettes, with Korgan again pitching three shutouts and no losses, allowing only three hits and pitching a no-hitter in the final. The Brewery Maids repeated in 1947 for their third straight title as Korgan went 3-0, pitching two shutouts and winning the final game against the Phoenix Ramblers, 6-4.

From 1945 to 1947, the Jax Brewery Maids compiled a record of 143-20, with 11 of the losses coming at the hands of men’s teams. From 1941 through 1947, Korgan pitched and won the Amateur Softball Association women’s final championship game in six out of seven years. In national tournaments, she accumulated a record of 21-0 with 18 shutouts, and five no-hitters, including one perfect game. She had two championship tournament shutout streaks—one with seven in a row from 1941 to 1942, and the second with eight in a row from 1945 through 1947. She pitched 168 innings during those championships, striking out 254 batters and giving up only six runs on 35 hits.

In 1948, Korgan left more of the pitching duties to her teammate, Lottie Jackson, but won three games in the National Softball Congress women’s championship tournament, including one shutout, as Jax Brewery won its fourth straight title. Korgan played centerfield when she was not pitching, to keep her bat in the lineup. She played a partial season in 1949 before retiring from active play at age 33 to manage the D.H. Holmes Girls softball team in New Orleans from 1949 to 1951. In 1954, Korgan came out of retirement to pitch for the New Orleans Jurisch Transfers and was named most valuable player of the southwestern regional tournament. The following year she won the southwestern regional most valuable player award again and led the Transfers to ninth place in the Amateur Softball Association national tournament, pitching 25 strikeouts in 18 innings.

All through her competitive days, Korgan was lauded for her charisma as well as her talent on the mound. Columnist Dick Freeman of the Houston Chronicle gave a typical example of how the fans idolized her in 1941:

The title of the most popular visiting girl softball player ever to perform in Houston was won by Nina Korgan. And the tall, dark and handsome Korgan won the title hands down. Women fans baked cakes and brought them to the park for her. Others gave her handkerchiefs and other gifts. But the finest tribute to her was a cheering section organized by the Houston Richey girls, a team she had beaten two consecutive nights … [they] yelled their hearts out for the popular Korgan.

New Orleans Item sports columnist Scoop Kennedy wrote that Korgan had “a magnetic personality and moves about with the grace of a leopard. Wherever she goes, she’s in the spotlight. Eyes naturally veer in her direction. She’s a champion and looks it.”

== Later years and death ==
Korgan continued to work as an accountant at Jax Brewery of New Orleans until her retirement in 1978. Until as late as the 1960s, she worked out regularly with softball teams and bowled competitively for the Jax Brewery bowling team.

She was inducted into the National Softball Hall of Fame in 1960, the Greater New Orleans Sports Hall of Fame in 1978, the Nebraska Softball Hall of Fame in 1979, and the Nebraska Sports Hall of Fame in 1994. The Omaha Softball Association for many years presented the Nina Korgan Award to the top high-school-age female fast-pitch softball player in Omaha.

Nina Korgan died at the age of 93 in Sand Springs, Oklahoma, and is buried at Lewis Township Cemetery in Council Bluffs, Iowa.
