= Daniel Tillo =

American baseball player (born 1996)

- Pitcher
- Born: June 13, 1996 (age 30); Sioux City, Iowa, U.S.
- Bats: Left Throws: Left
- Stats at Baseball Reference

Daniel Vincent Tillo (born June 13, 1996) is an American former professional baseball pitcher.

Tillo was drafted by the Kansas City Royals in the third round of the 2017 Major League Baseball draft. He spent time on the team's 40-man roster, but never played in MLB.

== Amateur career ==
Tillo attended Sioux City North High School in Sioux City, Iowa, where he played football, basketball, and baseball. As a junior in 2014, he pitched to a 6-0 record and a 0.98 ERA. Following his senior basketball season in 2015, he was named Iowa Mr. Basketball after averaging 24.5 point, 9.0 rebounds, and 4.4 assists per game. During his senior baseball season, he went 5-1 with a 3.08 ERA while batting .369. Due to being uncertain on whether he wanted to pursue basketball or baseball at the collegiate level, he did not commit to a college for either sport until June of his senior year, when he ultimately decided to play college baseball at the University of Kentucky. After his senior year, he was drafted by the Minnesota Twins in the 39th round of the 2015 Major League Baseball (MLB) draft.

Tillo chose to honor his commitment to Kentucky, and not sign with the Twins. In 2016, his freshman year, he pitched only 7 1/3 innings. Following the year, he transferred to Iowa Western Community College in order to be closer to home and to transition back into a starting pitcher. In 2017, his sophomore year and first year at Iowa Western, he went 5-1 with a 2.86 ERA, striking out 57 over 44 innings and nine games (five starts). After the season, he was drafted by the Kansas City Royals in the third round of the 2017 Major League Baseball draft.

== Professional career ==
=== Kansas City Royals ===
Tillo signed with the Royals and made his professional debut with the Rookie-level Arizona League Royals before being promoted to the Burlington Royals of the Rookie-level Appalachian League. Over ten games (nine starts) between the two clubs, he pitched to a 3-2 record with a 4.42 ERA over 36 2/3 innings. In 2018, he began the season with the Lexington Legends of the Single–A South Atlantic League before being promoted to the Wilmington Blue Rocks of the High–A Carolina League. Starting 26 total games between the two teams, Tillo went 4-6 with a 4.76 ERA, striking out 100 over 134 1/3 innings.

Tillo began the 2019 season back with Wilmington, and was promoted to the Northwest Arkansas Naturals of the Double–A Texas League in July, finishing the season there. Over 29 games (23 starts) for the season, he compiled an 8-9 record with a 3.72 ERA, striking out 85 over 130 2/3 innings. Following the season, he pitched in the Arizona Fall League for the Surprise Saguaros. On October 10, he was selected for the United States national baseball team in the 2019 WBSC Premier 12. In the tournament, he pitched to a 2.08 ERA in three relief appearances covering 4 1/3 innings in which he struck out eight batters.

Tillo did not play a minor league game in 2020 due to the cancellation of the minor league season caused by the COVID-19 pandemic. In July, he underwent Tommy John surgery. On November 20, 2020, he was added to the 40-man roster. On May 3, 2021, Tillo was placed on the 60-day injured list as he continued to recover. He was activated in late June and began rehabbing. On August 9, his rehab ended and he was assigned to Northwest Arkansas. He pitched 29 innings in which he went 0-3 with a 4.03 ERA and 27 strikeouts.

On April 7, 2022, Tillo was designated for assignment by the Royals to make room on the 40-man roster for Bobby Witt Jr. Tillo was released by the Royals organization on April 14. Tillo had not appeared in a major league game at the time of his release.

=== San Francisco Giants ===
On April 17, 2022, Tillo signed a minor league contract with the San Francisco Giants. He was assigned to the Sacramento River Cats of the Triple-A Pacific Coast League. Tillo did not immediately appear for Sacramento due to an undisclosed injury, and began a rehab assignment with the rookie–level Arizona Complex League Giants on July 21. He was activated from the injured list on August 23 and assigned to the High–A Eugene Emeralds. Following a short stint with Eugene, Tillo would make 9 appearances split between the Double–A Richmond Flying Squirrels and Sacramento to close out the year.

Tillo returned to Triple–A Sacramento to begin the 2023 season. In 17 appearances (4 starts), he struggled to a 1–6 and 9.59 ERA with 17 strikeouts in 25 1/3 innings pitched. He was released by the Giants organization on June 11, 2023.

== Personal life ==
Tillo is an avid baseball card collector and collects rare cards of himself.
