= Jacob Nix =

American baseball player (born 1996)

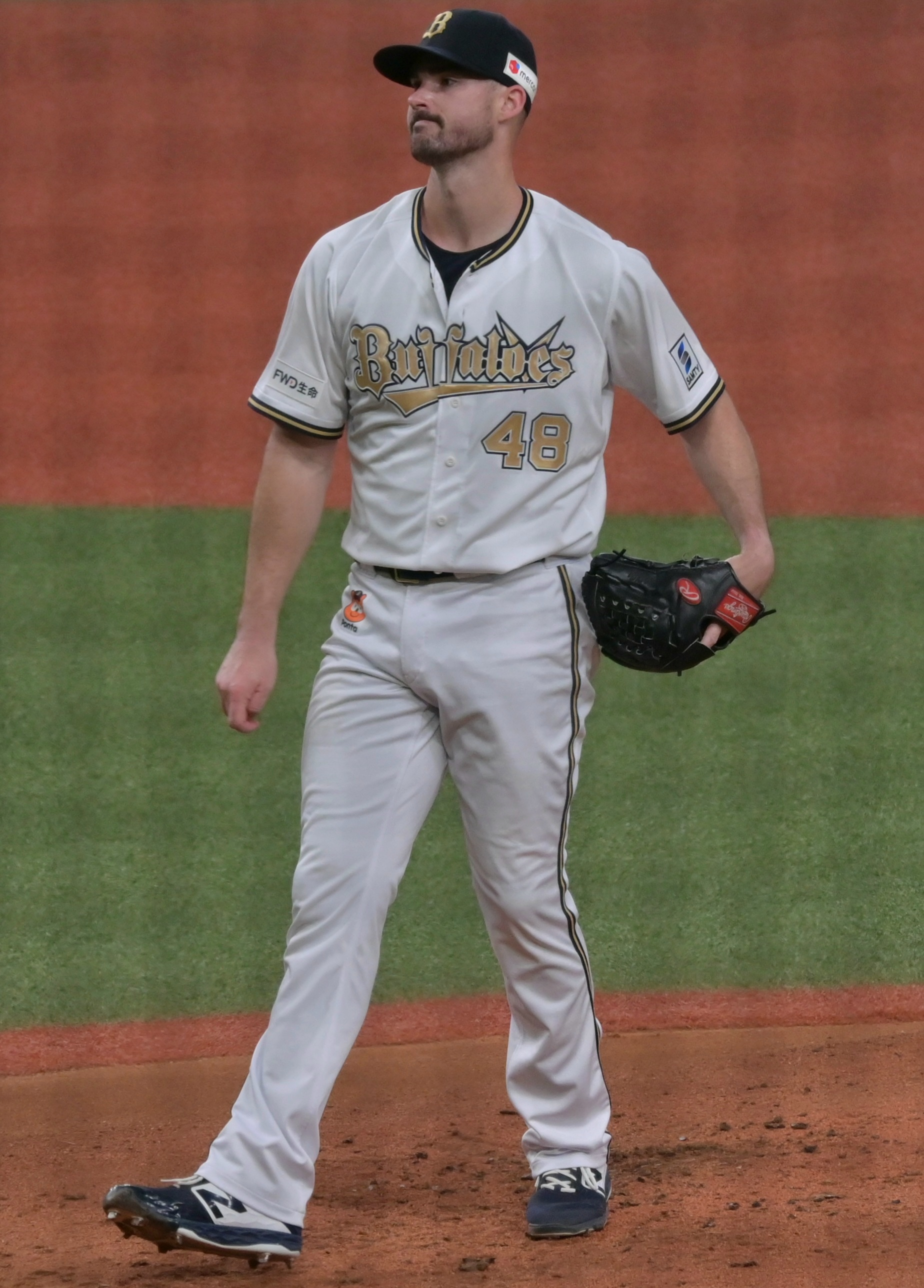
- Nix with the Orix Buffaloes in 2023

Free agent
- Pitcher
- Born: January 9, 1996 (age 30); Los Alamitos, California, U.S.
- Bats: Right Throws: Right

Professional debut
- MLB: August 10, 2018, for the San Diego Padres
- NPB: April 9, 2023, for the Orix Buffaloes

MLB statistics (through 2018 season)
- Win–loss record: 2–5
- Earned run average: 7.02
- Strikeouts: 21

NPB statistics (through 2023 season)
- Win–loss record: 0–1
- Earned run average: 10.50
- Strikeouts: 5
- Stats at Baseball Reference

Teams
- San Diego Padres (2018); Orix Buffaloes (2023)
Medals
Men's baseball
Representing United States
18U Baseball World Cup
Gold medal – first place	2013 Taichung	Team

Jacob James Nix (born January 9, 1996) is an American professional baseball pitcher who is a free agent. He has previously played in Major League Baseball (MLB) for the San Diego Padres and in Nippon Professional Baseball (NPB) for the Orix Buffaloes.

Nix was picked by the Houston Astros in the fifth round of the 2014 MLB draft out of Los Alamitos High School. They agreed on an above slot signing bonus, which the Astros were unable to pay when first round pick Brady Aiken refused to sign, which lowered their bonus pool. He went unsigned himself, and attended the IMG Academy, and was then drafted by the Padres in the third round of the 2015 MLB draft.

== Amateur career ==
Nix grew up playing youth baseball as a catcher. He was involved in a home plate collision at the age of 11 that led to chronic pain in his back, and required spinal fusion surgery, which he had at the age of 12. He grew up a Cardinals fan.

Nix attended Los Alamitos High School in Los Alamitos, California, and played for their baseball team. He played as a catcher until his freshman year, when he was needed as a pitcher. In his junior year, Nix pitched to a 7–2 win–loss record with a 2.80 earned run average (ERA), and was named to the Press-Telegram's all-area first team. He committed to attend the University of California, Los Angeles (UCLA) on a college baseball scholarship to play for the UCLA Bruins baseball team. At the start of his senior year of high school, Nix played for the United States national baseball team in the 2013 18U Baseball World Cup. The United States won the gold medal in the event. By the start of his senior season, his fastball velocity ranged from 92 to 95 miles per hour (148 to 153 km/h).

The Houston Astros selected Nix in the fifth round, with the 136th overall selection, of the 2014 Major League Baseball (MLB) draft. Nix and the Astros agreed to terms on a contract, including a $1.5 million signing bonus, well above the $370,500 recommended at the 136th slot. However, the Astros failed to come to terms with Brady Aiken, the first overall selection of the draft, which reduced their allotted draft pool, leaving them unable to sign Nix without incurring penalties. The Astros reneged on their agreements with Nix and Mac Marshall, and offered Nix a $616,165 signing bonus, which was the most the Astros could offer him without incurring penalties. Nix rejected the offer. He filed a grievance against the Astros, which put his collegiate eligibility in jeopardy. The two sides reached a settlement in December, but did not disclose the terms.

Rather than wait for a ruling on his collegiate eligibility, Nix opted to take a post-graduate year at the IMG Academy in Bradenton, Florida, to play for their baseball team. In this way, he became eligible for the 2015 MLB draft. After watching him throw for scouts, Keith Law, a draft expert for ESPN, wrote that he believes Nix could be a first-round pick. In ten starts for the IMG Academy, Nix improved his fastball velocity to 95 to 97 miles per hour (153 to 156 km/h), improved his changeup, and developed a curveball.

== Professional career ==
=== San Diego Padres ===
Nix did not consent to being reselected by the Astros in the 2015 draft. The San Diego Padres selected Nix in the third round, with the 86th overall selection, of the draft. He signed with the Padres, receiving a $900,000 signing bonus. Nix was assigned to the Arizona League Padres, where he spent the whole season, pitching to a 0–2 record with a 5.49 ERA in seven games. In 2016, Nix pitched for the Fort Wayne TinCaps of the Single–A Midwest League, where he posted a 3–7 record with a 3.93 ERA.

Nix spent the 2017 season with both the Lake Elsinore Storm of the High–A California League and the San Antonio Missions of the Double–A Texas League, where he went a combined 5–5 with a 4.67 ERA between both teams. In 2018, the Padres invited Nix to spring training. Nix made nine starts for San Antonio, pitching to a 2.05 ERA, and then made one start for the El Paso Chihuahuas of the Triple–A Pacific Coast League, not allowing a run, before the Padres decided to promote Nix to the major leagues to make his debut on August 10. He made nine starts, going 2–5 in 42 1/3 innings and a 7.02 ERA. Nix suffered a tear in his ulnar collateral ligament of the elbow in March 2019. He elected to rehab the injury and forgo surgery. Nix returned to game action on July 26, and made rehab appearances for the AZL Padres, Lake Elsinore, the Amarillo Sod Poodles, and El Paso. Following the 2019 season, Nix made one appearance for the Peoria Javelinas of the Arizona Fall League. Nix was designated for assignment on November 4, and sent outright to El Paso on November 11.

Nix did not play in a game in 2020 due to the cancellation of the minor league season because of the COVID-19 pandemic. In 2021, Nix suffered an elbow injury in spring training that required Tommy John surgery. He underwent the surgery in mid-March. Nix elected free agency following the season on November 10, 2022.

=== Orix Buffaloes ===
On December 29, 2022, Nix signed with the Orix Buffaloes of Nippon Professional Baseball. He made two appearances for Orix in 2023, allowing seven runs on seven hits with five strikeouts across six innings pitched. Nix became a free agent following the 2023 season.

=== Lake Country DockHounds ===
On December 6, 2024, Nix signed with the Lake Country DockHounds of the American Association of Professional Baseball. He made eight starts for the DockHounds in 2025, posting a 1-1 record and 3.72 ERA with 53 strikeouts over 46 innings of work.

=== Tecolotes de los Dos Laredos ===
On June 30, 2025, Nix was loaned to the Tecolotes de los Dos Laredos of the Mexican League. In five appearances (four starts) for Dos Laredos, he struggled to an 0-4 record and 15.70 ERA with 13 strikeouts across 14 1/3 innings pitched. Nix was released by the Tecolotes on August 1.

=== Lake Country DockHounds (second stint) ===
On August 28, 2025, Nix signed with the Lake Country DockHounds of the American Association of Professional Baseball. He made 10 appearances for the DockHounds, compiling a 2-1 record and 4.04 ERA with 65 strikeouts across 55 2/3 innings pitched. He became a free agent following the season.

=== Olmecas de Tabasco ===
On May 24, 2026, Nix signed with the Olmecas de Tabasco of the Mexican League. In nine starts for the Olmecas, he posted a 2–6 record with a 6.47 ERA and 39 strikeouts in 32 innings. On July 16, Nix was released by Tabasco.

== Legal issues ==
On October 6, 2019, Nix was arrested and charged with criminal trespassing, having allegedly broken into a house in Peoria, Arizona, through a doggy door. An inebriated Nix was kicked in the face and tased by the homeowner prior to Nix fleeing, and was arrested by local police not far from the scene.
