= Dom Thompson-Williams =

American baseball player (born 1995)

- Outfielder
- Born: April 21, 1995 (age 31); Sioux City, Iowa, U.S.
- Bats: Left Throws: Left
- Stats at Baseball Reference

Dominique Danton Thompson-Williams (born April 21, 1995) is an American former professional baseball outfielder.

== Career ==
Thompson-Williams attended East High School in Sioux City, Iowa. In 2013, he was named the state's high school baseball player of the year. In 2014, he attended Iowa Western Community College. He transferred to the University of South Carolina to play for the South Carolina Gamecocks for the 2016 season.

=== New York Yankees ===
The New York Yankees selected Thompson-Williams in the fifth round, with the 158th overall selection, of the 2016 MLB draft, and he signed with the Yankees, beginning his professional career. He made his professional debut with the Staten Island Yankees of the Low–A New York-Penn League, batting .246 with three home runs, 16 RBIs, and 15 stolen bases in 56 games.

In 2017, Thompson-Williams began the year with Staten Island before the Yankees promoted him to the Charleston RiverDogs of the Single–A South Atlantic League in August. In 64 games between both clubs, he hit .244 with three home runs and 28 RBIs.

Thompson-Williams began the 2018 season with Charleston and received a midseason promotion to the Tampa Tarpons of the High–A Florida State League. The Yankees promoted him to the Trenton Thunder of the Double–A Eastern League for the playoffs. In 100 total games for the year, he slashed .299/.363/.546 with 22 home runs, 74 RBIs, and twenty stolen bases.

=== Seattle Mariners ===
On November 19, 2018, the Yankees traded Thompson-Williams, Justus Sheffield, and Erik Swanson to the Seattle Mariners in exchange for James Paxton. He started the 2019 season with the Arkansas Travelers of the Double–A Texas League. In 115 games for Arkansas, he hit .234/.298/.391 with 12 home runs, 41 RBI, and 15 stolen bases.

On February 24, 2020, Thompson-Williams underwent surgery to repair a ruptured Achilles tendon, and missed the entire 2020 season, which was cancelled because of the COVID-19 pandemic. He returned to Arkansas for the 2021 season, playing in 58 contests and batting just .184/.254/.311 with 5 home runs and 28 RBI. Thompson-Williams was released by the Mariners organization on April 2, 2022.
