= Sioux City Community School District =

School district in Iowa, United States

Coordinates: 42.494528°N 96.402272°W

Location
- Sioux City, Iowa Woodbury County and Plymouth County United States

District information
- Type: Local School District
- Motto: believe...achieve...succeed
- Grades: Preschool-12
- Superintendent: Rod Earleywine
- Schools: 20
- Budget: $210,493,000 (2020-21)
- NCES District ID: 1926400

Students and staff
- Students: 14,989 (2022-23)
- Teachers: 971.57 FTE
- Staff: 948.71 FTE
- Student–teacher ratio: 15.43
- Athletic conference: Missouri River

Other information
- Website: www.siouxcityschools.org

Sioux City Community School District (SCCSD) is a public school district headquartered in the Educational Service Center in Sioux City, Iowa. The district is mostly in Woodbury County, with a portion in Plymouth County.

== History ==
In 2025 the board of trustees voted to have NCS Collection Agency take $79,628.38 in unpaid school lunch money debts.

== Schools ==
=== High Schools ===
- East High School
- North High School
- West High School

=== Middle Schools ===
- East Middle School
- North Middle School
- West Middle School

=== Elementary Schools ===
- Bryant
- Hunt A+ Arts
- Irving Dual Language
- Leeds
- Liberty
- Loess Hills Computer Programming
- Morningside STEM
- Nodland & Sunnyside
- Perry Creek
- Riverside
- Spalding Park Environmental Sciences
- Unity

=== Career Academies ===
- Sioux City Career Academy

=== Preschool Locations for 2024-2025 ===
- Bryant Elementary School
- Clark Early Childhood Learning Center
- Hunt A+ Arts Elementary School
- Leeds Elementary School
- Loess Hills Computer Programming Elementary School
- Morningside STEM Elementary School
- Riverside Elementary School
- Spalding Park Environmental Sciences Elementary School
- Unity Elementary School
