= Lewis Central Community School District =

Public school district in Council Bluffs, Iowa, United States

Coordinates: 41.218660°N 95.814389°W

Location
- Council Bluffs, Iowa Pottawattamie County and Mills County United States
- Coordinates: 41.218660, -95.814389

District information
- Type: Local school district
- Motto: Inspire excellence in every student
- Grades: K-12
- Established: 1960's
- Superintendent: Brent Hoesing
- Schools: 4
- Budget: $44,952,000 (2020-21)
- NCES District ID: 1931680

Students and staff
- Students: 3022 (2022-23)
- Teachers: 188.55 FTE
- Staff: 193.14 FTE
- Student–teacher ratio: 16.03
- Athletic conference: Hawkeye 10
- District mascot: Titans
- Colors: Navy and white

Other information
- Website: www.lewiscentral.org

The Lewis Central Community School District is a public school district headquartered in Council Bluffs, Iowa, U.S.

The district is located primarily in southwestern Council Bluffs. It serves the southern portion of the Council Bluffs as well as rural Pottawattamie County and a small part of northern Mills County.

== Schools ==
- Lewis Central High School (Grades 9–12)
- Lewis Central Middle School (Grades 6–8)
- Titan Hill Intermediate School (Grades 2–5)
- E.A. Kreft Primary School (Preschool-Grade 1)

== Lewis Central Community High School ==
=== Athletics ===
The Titans compete in the Missouri River Conference in the following sports:

==== Fall ====
- Cross country (boys and girls)
  - Boys' Class 2A State Champions (1973)
- Football
  - 2-time Class 4A State Champions (2021, 2023)
- Volleyball
- Girls swimming
  - 1-time Class 4A State Champions (2021)
- Volleyball

==== Winter ====
- Basketball (boys and girls)
- Bowling
  - Boys Class 2A State Champions (2025)
- Wrestling (boys and girls)
  - 3-time Class 3A State Champions (2000, 2001, 2004)

==== Spring ====
- Golf (boys and girls)
- Soccer (boys and girls)
  - Boys' Class 2A State Champions (2019, 2022)
  - Girls' Class 2A State Champions (2016, 2017, 2018)
- Tennis (boys and girls)
- Track and field (boys and girls)

==== Summer ====
- Baseball
- Softball

== Student demographics ==
The following figures from the Iowa Department of Education are as of February 2020.

- Total District Enrollment: 3,017
- Student enrollment by gender
  - Male: 1,548 (51.3%)
  - Female: 1,469 (48.7%)
- Student enrollment by ethnicity
  - Asian: 19 (.6%)
  - Black: 41 (1.4%)
  - Multi-race 124 (4.1%)
  - Hispanic: 316 (10.5%)
  - White: 2505 (83%)

== Notable alumni ==
- Logan Jones -- 2020 -- center for the Iowa Hawkeyes and was selected by the Bears in the second round of the 2026 NFL draft.
- Caleb Shudak – 2016 – placekicker for the Iowa Hawkeyes and Tennessee Titans
- Max Duggan – 2019 – quarterback for Texas Christian University Horned Frogs
- Thomas Fidone – 2021 – tight end for the New York Giants
- James D. Pettit – 1974 – American diplomat; ambassador to Moldova, 2015–2018

== See also ==
- List of school districts in Iowa
- List of high schools in Iowa
