= Caleb Shudak =

American football player (born 1997)

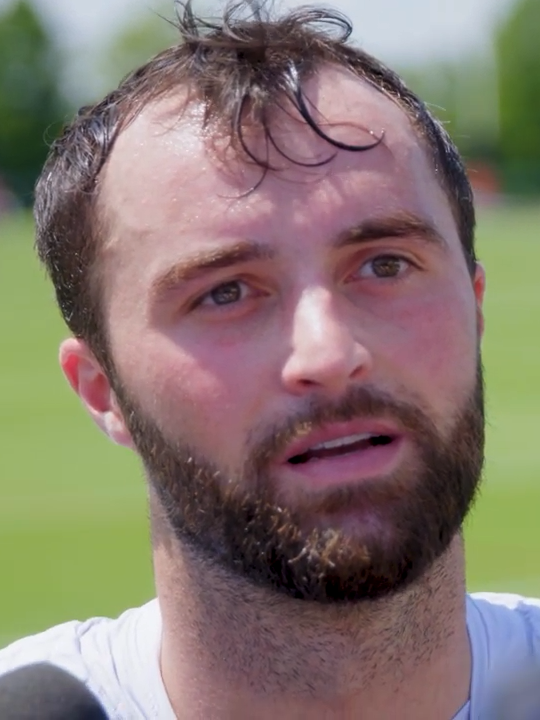
- Shudak in 2022

Profile
- Position: Placekicker

Personal information
- Born: November 19, 1997 (age 28); Council Bluffs, Iowa, U.S.
- Listed height: 5 ft 8 in (1.73 m)
- Listed weight: 175 lb (79 kg)

Career information
- High school: Lewis Central (IA)
- College: Iowa
- NFL draft: 2022: undrafted

Career history
- Tennessee Titans (2022); Iowa Rampage (2024); Omaha Beef (2025)

Awards and highlights
- First-team All-Big Ten (2021)

Career NFL statistics
- Field goals made: 3
- Field goals attempted: 4
- Longest field goal: 38
- Stats at Pro Football Reference

Caleb Shudak (born November 19, 1997) is an American professional football placekicker. He played college football at Iowa and was signed by the Titans as an undrafted free agent in 2022.

== Early life ==
Shudak was born on November 19, 1997, in Council Bluffs, Iowa. He attended Lewis Central High School, where he played five sports (football, track, swimming, tennis, baseball) and was a four-year varsity player in football. Shudak assisted the school in making the football playoffs four consecutive seasons and played placekicker, defensive back, running back, and linebacker. He earned all-city and first-team all-district, as well as All-Western Iowa, honors in his first three seasons at the school and was named all-state as a senior.

== College career ==
In 2016, Shudak began attending the University of Iowa after making their football team as a walk-on. He redshirted as a true freshman in 2016, and did not see any game action in 2017. While earning academic all-conference honors in 2018, Shudak made an appearance in one match, converting his only PAT attempt in a 63–0 win over Illinois.

In 2019, Shudak began handling Iowa's kickoffs. He earned Academic All-Big Ten honors and recorded an average of 58.2 yards on 75 kicks, with only one going out of bounds. The following season, Shudak handled kickoffs in eight games and had an average of 60.6 yards on 51 kicks. He also recorded the first field goal attempt of his career, 52 yards, which was no good after hitting the upright.

After being given an extra year of eligibility due to COVID-19, Shudak opted to return to the team in 2021. He became the team's main kicker on field goals and made 24-of-28 attempts, which was the fourth-best single season average in school history. He also made all 36 of his PATs and totaled 108 points on the season, placing fifth all-time in Iowa scoring for a single season. After the season ended, he received the Brett Greenwood Award, Reggie Roby Special Teams Award, Forest Evashevski Academic Achievement Award, and was named third-team All-American by Associated Press (AP), as well as first-team All-Big Ten by the league media. After converting four field goals in a 28–21 win over the Nebraska Cornhuskers, Shudak was given the conference special teams player of the week award.

== Professional career ==
Pre-draft measurables
Height	Weight	Arm length	Hand span
5 ft 6 5/8 in (1.69 m)	177 lb (80 kg)	28 3/8 in (0.72 m)	9 in (0.23 m)
All values from Pro Day

=== Tennessee Titans ===
After going unselected in the 2022 NFL draft, Shudak was signed by the Tennessee Titans as an undrafted free agent. He was placed on the physically unable to perform (PUP) list to start the season. He was activated for Week 12, after an injury to Randy Bullock, and made his NFL debut against the Cincinnati Bengals, converting 3 of 4 fields goals and one PAT attempt. He was waived on December 3, but signed with the practice squad three days later. He signed a reserve/future contract on January 10, 2023. On August 22, 2023, Shudak was waived by the Titans.

=== Arena football ===
In April 2024, Shudak signed with the Iowa Rampage, an arena football team that ultimately folded a month later after a single game and without playing a single home game. Then, ahead of the 2024 NFL season, the Pittsburgh Steelers brought Shudak into their spring mini-camp, but he did not ultimately make the team.

In December 2024, Shudak signed with the Omaha Beef of the National Arena League ahead of the 2025 NAL season.

== Personal life ==
Shudak's father, Jeff, played kicker at Iowa State and is one of their all-time leading scorers.
