= Logan Jones =

American football player (born 2001)

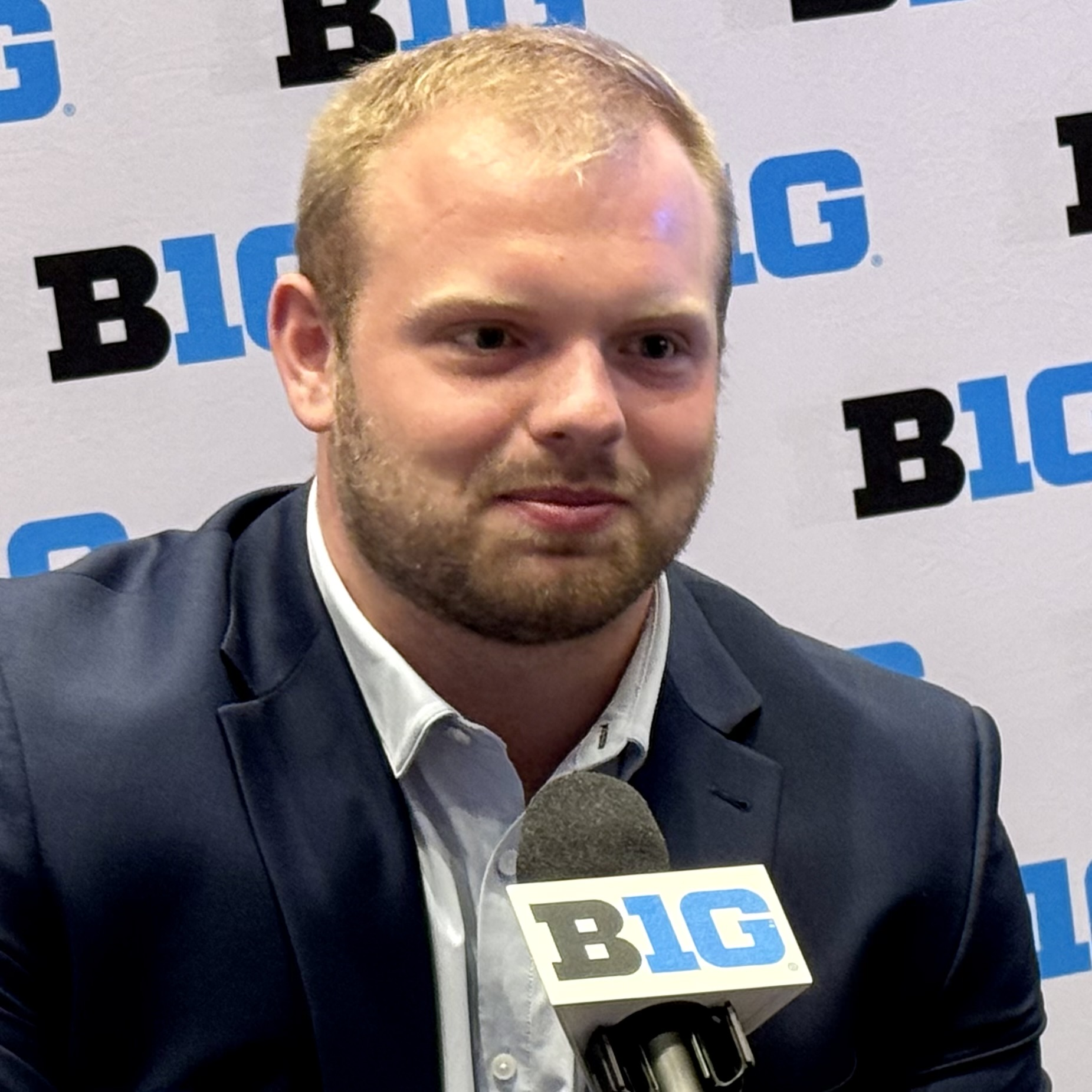
- Jones at 2025 Big Ten Media Days

No. 54 – Chicago Bears
- Position: Center
- Roster status: Active

Personal information
- Born: October 19, 2001 (age 25)
- Listed height: 6 ft 3 in (1.91 m)
- Listed weight: 299 lb (136 kg)

Career information
- High school: Lewis Central (Council Bluffs, Iowa)
- College: Iowa (2020–2025)
- NFL draft: 2026: 2nd round, 57th overall pick

Career history
- Chicago Bears (2026–present)

Awards and highlights
- Rimington Trophy (2025); Joe Moore Award (2025) (Note: As part of the Iowa Hawkeyes offensive line); Unanimous All-American (2025); 2× First-team All-Big Ten (2024, 2025); Third-team All-Big Ten (2023)

Career NFL statistics as of Week 5, 2026
- Games played: 5
- Stats at Pro Football Reference

Logan Jones (born October 19, 2001) is an American professional football center for the Chicago Bears of the National Football League (NFL). He previously played college football for the Iowa Hawkeyes and was selected by the Bears in the second round of the 2026 NFL draft.

== Early life ==
A native of Council Bluffs, Iowa, Jones began playing football in the second grade. He attended Lewis Central High School in Council Bluffs, where he played center, offensive tackle, defensive tackle, and defensive end for the football team. Jones was rated as a three-star recruit and committed to play college football for the Iowa Hawkeyes over offers from schools such as Iowa State, Minnesota, and Nebraska.

== College career ==
Jones took a redshirt in 2020 before a knee injury limited to one game in 2021 at defensive tackle. Ahead of the 2022 season, he was converted to a center following the graduation of Tyler Linderbaum and an injury to backup Mike Myslinski. Jones earned third-team all-Big Ten Conference honors in 2023, followed by first-team honors in 2024. In his final season at Iowa, Jones was again named First-team All-Big Ten. He also earned Unanimous First-team All-American honors and was awarded the Rimington Trophy. He started 49 games at center for the Hawkeyes from 2022 through 2025.

== Professional career ==
Pre-draft measurables
Height	Weight	Arm length	Hand span	Wingspan	40-yard dash	10-yard split	20-yard split	20-yard shuttle	Three-cone drill	Vertical jump	Broad jump
6 ft 2 7/8 in (1.90 m)	299 lb (136 kg)	30 3/4 in (0.78 m)	9 1/2 in (0.24 m)	6 ft 4 in (1.93 m)	4.90 s	1.75 s	2.87 s	4.45 s	7.35 s	34.5 in (0.88 m)	9 ft 2 in (2.79 m)
All values from NFL Combine/Pro Day

Jones was selected by the Chicago Bears in the second round with the 57th overall pick in the 2026 NFL draft. On June 5, 2026, Jones signed a four-year, $8.468 million contract with the Bears. He was assigned No. 54 as his jersey number, becoming the first Bear to wear the number since Pro Football Hall of Fame linebacker Brian Urlacher retired in 2012; Jones called the number "such an honor", while Urlacher approved of the number's return with him.

For his rookie season, Jones was the Bears' backup center to Garrett Bradbury. He made his debut in Week 6 against the Atlanta Falcons when the starters were pulled in the fourth quarter.
