= Brady Aiken =

American baseball player (born 1996)

- Pitcher
- Born: August 16, 1996 (age 29); San Diego, California, U.S.
- Bats: Left Throws: Left
- Stats at Baseball Reference
Medals
Men's baseball
Representing United States
18U Baseball World Cup
Gold medal – first place	2013 Taichung	Team

Brady James Aiken (born August 16, 1996) is an American former professional baseball pitcher and current sports agent.

Aiken was drafted by Major League Baseball's Houston Astros with the first overall pick of the 2014 Major League Baseball draft, but did not sign with the team. He enrolled at the IMG Academy in Bradenton, Florida as a postgraduate student. The Cleveland Indians selected him 17th overall in the 2015 MLB draft, and released him in 2021. He is one of only three players to be drafted first overall in the Major League Baseball draft and never play in the major leagues, along with Steve Chilcott and Brien Taylor.

== Early life ==
Aiken was born in San Diego, California on August 16, 1996. He attended Cathedral Catholic High School. Aiken pitched for the 18U United States national baseball team in 2013 and helped lead the team to gold in the 2013 18U Baseball World Cup. He started the gold medal game and pitched seven innings with 10 strikeouts and giving up only one run. In February 2014, he was awarded the USA Baseball International Performance of the Year Award for his play.

== 2014 Major League Baseball draft ==
Aiken was considered one of the top prospects heading into the 2014 Major League Baseball draft. In March 2014, he was ranked by Keith Law as the top prospect for the draft. The Houston Astros selected Aiken with the first overall selection. Soon after the draft, it seemed that the Astros and Aiken had agreed to a $6.5 million signing bonus, but the offer was reduced to $5 million, after Aiken's physical revealed inflammation in the elbow of his throwing arm. A dispute arose over this adjusted bonus, and Aiken did not sign when the July 18 deadline elapsed.

The Astros' failure to sign Aiken set off a chain reaction of events that led to them being unable to sign two of their other draft picks from the 2014 MLB draft. When the Astros made their original offer of $6.5 million to Aiken, they also offered $1.5 million to their fifth round selection, Southern California high school pitcher Jacob Nix. According to MLB's draft policies, when the Astros revised their offer to Aiken, and he decided not to sign, the amount of money Houston could spend on their draft picks was severely reduced. Under the structure of MLB's draft bonus pool, each draft slot came with an assigned value. In 2014, the top pick in the draft had an assigned value of $8 million. When the Astros offered $6.5 million to Aiken, the remaining $1.5 million from that assigned value could be used on other draft picks. This was where the money was used in the offer to Nix originated from.

When Aiken declined to accept the revised $5 million contract offer, the entire $8 million slotted for the number one pick in the draft was removed from Houston's available bonus pool. Therefore, the money that was to be used to pay Nix was no longer available. The only offer Houston could make to Nix without incurring any penalties, such as a hefty luxury tax bill or the forfeiture of draft picks, for going over their bonus pool allotment was a severely reduced $616,165. Nix declined the offer and filed a grievance with the MLB Players Association, which meant that his scholarship offer to UCLA was null and void due to NCAA restrictions. Nix settled with the Astros prior to the grievance being heard by an arbitrator, who could have ruled that the Astros were obliged to sign Nix, at which point, they would have had to forfeit two future first-round draft picks.

The third player involved in the Aiken fallout was Mac Marshall, the 21st-round pick of the Astros, a high school pitcher from Georgia. Marshall was one of the top prospects in the draft who only fell as far as he did because of his monetary demands and the difficulty MLB teams perceived in signing him. He, too, wanted a $1.5 million signing bonus, but with the Astros out of bonus pool money and not willing to foreshadow any penalties, they opted not to offer Marshall what he was seeking.

Aiken became the first number one overall draft pick not to sign since Tim Belcher in 1983. On August 27, it was reported that the Astros were still eligible to still sign Aiken, as the other 29 MLB teams agreed to allow the use of a clause in the draft which negated the deadline. It was also reported that if he were to sign, Aiken would insist on a sign-and-trade deal.

In February 2015, Aiken enrolled at IMG Academy's postgraduate baseball program, which joined him with Nix, who was also playing at IMG after not having signed with Houston. Aiken was removed in the first inning of his first start for IMG, citing elbow discomfort. On March 26, Aiken announced that he underwent Tommy John surgery after being told he had torn the ulnar collateral ligament in his left elbow, which was a condition the Astros were growing concerned about all along, and that it caused the organization to withdraw their initial offer after drafting him in the 2014 MLB Draft.

As a result of not signing Aiken, the Astros were awarded the second overall pick for the 2015 draft, which they used to select Alex Bregman.

== Professional career ==
The Cleveland Indians selected Aiken with the 17th overall selection of the 2015 draft. Aiken signed with the Indians agreeing to a signing bonus of $2,513,280. Aiken made his professional debut with the Arizona League Indians in June 2016, and he was later promoted to the Mahoning Valley Scrappers. Aiken ended 2016 with a combined 2–5 record and a 5.83 ERA between both clubs. He spent the 2017 season with the Lake County Captains of the Single-A Midwest League, where he posted a 5–13 record with a 4.77 ERA in 27 games.

Aiken did not pitch in 2018, as he stayed at Cleveland's facility in Arizona to focus on his strength and conditioning, pitching mechanics, and increasing his self-confidence. Aiken returned to Lake County in 2019. He pitched in two games during the 2019 season, throwing 2/3 of an inning. Aiken took some time away from the game of baseball afterwards. The Indians were unsure of his status going forward for the 2020 season, which ended up being canceled because of the COVID-19 pandemic. Aiken spent the entire 2021 season on the injured list of the High-A Lake County Captains. The Indians released Aiken on October 4, 2021.

== Post-playing career ==
Since 2023, Aiken has worked with Excel Sports Management, now as a "MLBPA Certified Player Agent."

== See also ==
- List of baseball players who underwent Tommy John surgery
