= A. J. Simcox =

American baseball player (born 1994)

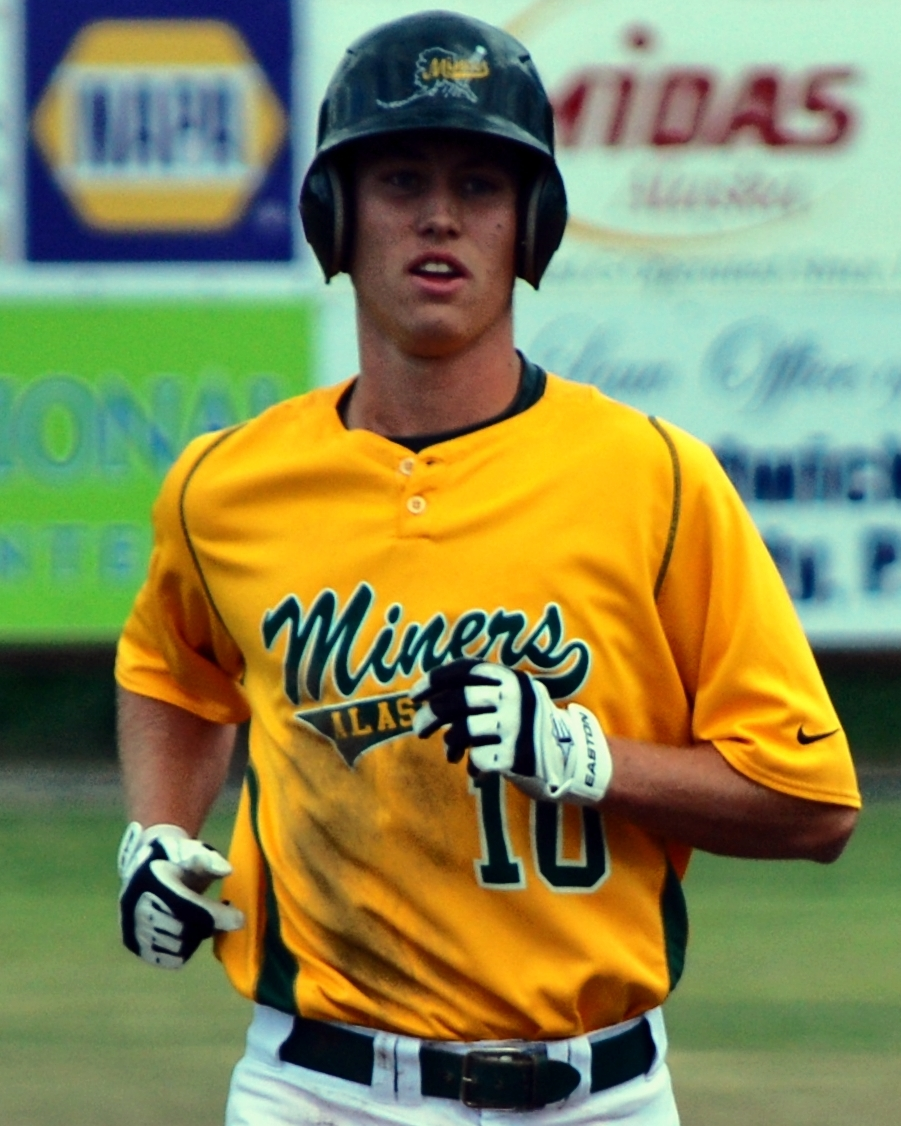
- Simcox with the Mat-Su Miners in 2013
- Shortstop
- Born: June 22, 1994 (age 31); Knoxville, Tennessee, U.S.
- Bats: Right Throws: Right

Austin Jay Simcox (born June 22, 1994) is an American former professional baseball shortstop. Previously, he played college baseball for the Tennessee Volunteers for the University of Tennessee. He was drafted in the 14th round of the 2015 Major League Baseball draft by the Detroit Tigers.

== Career ==
Simcox attended Farragut High School in Knoxville, Tennessee. He played for the school's baseball team as a shortstop and pitcher, but a back injury prevented him from pitching in his sophomore year. The Colorado Rockies selected Simcox in the 32nd round, with the 978th overall selection, of the 2012 Major League Baseball (MLB) draft. He opted not to sign, and enrolled at the University of Tennessee to play college baseball for the Tennessee Volunteers. After his sophomore season in 2014, he played collegiate summer baseball for the Yarmouth–Dennis Red Sox of the Cape Cod Baseball League, where he batted .224 in 48 games, and helped lead the Red Sox to the league championship.

The Detroit Tigers selected Simcox in the 14th round, with the 430th overall selection, of the 2015 MLB draft. He signed with the Tigers, and played for four games with the Gulf Coast Tigers of the Rookie-level Gulf Coast League before he was promoted to the Connecticut Tigers of the Class A-Short Season New York-Penn League. After playing in 25 games for Connecticut, he was also promoted to the West Michigan Whitecaps of the Class A Midwest League. He posted a .330 batting average with one home runs and 21 RBIs in 49 games between the three clubs. In 2016, he played for the Lakeland Flying Tigers of the Class A-Advanced Florida State League, where he batted .262 with five home runs and 51 RBIs. Simcox spent 2017 with the Erie SeaWolves where he posted a .250 batting average, eight home runs, 36 RBIs, and 12 stolen bases.

Simcox split the 2018 season between Erie and Lakeland, slashing .219/.281/.315 with 4 home runs and 42 RBI between the two teams. In 2019, Simcox again spent the season with Erie and Lakeland, hitting .250/.306/.344 with 1 home run and 32 RBI in 107 games. Simcox did not play in a game in 2020 due to the cancellation of the minor league season because of the COVID-19 pandemic. On April 16, 2021, Simcox retired from professional baseball.

== Personal life ==
Simcox's father, Larry, is a former assistant coach for the Volunteers' baseball team.
