= Thomas Jefferson High School (Council Bluffs, Iowa) =

Public secondary school Council Bluffs, Iowa, United States

Location
- 2501 West Broadway; Council Bluffs, Iowa 51501; United States; 41.26123°N 95.88297°W

Information
- School type: Public secondary
- Opened: 1922
- School district: Council Bluffs Community School District
- Superintendent: Dr. Vickie Murillo
- Principal: Michael Naughton
- Staff: 65.99 (FTE)
- Grades: 9–12
- Enrollment: 1,146 (2024-2025)
- Student to teacher ratio: 17.37
- Colors: Orange and white
- Athletics conference: Missouri River Conference
- Mascot: Yellow Jacket
- Nickname: Tee Jay
- Rival: Abraham Lincoln High School
- Yearbook: Monticello
- Feeder schools: Woodrow Wilson Middle School
- Website: tj.cb-schools.org

Thomas Jefferson High School is a public high school located in Council Bluffs, Iowa, United States. It is one of two high schools in the Council Bluffs Community School District.

The school was opened in 1922 to serve students on the west end of Council Bluffs.

In 1986, students from the ninth grade were moved from the junior high school system to the high school system. Prior to this, the high school taught only the 10th, 11th and 12th grades.

== Sports ==
School mascot

The school competes in the Missouri River Conference in the following sports:

- Baseball
- Basketball
- Bowling
- Cross country
- Football
- Golf
- Soccer
- Softball
- Swimming
- Tennis
- Track
- Volleyball
- Wrestling

=== Successes ===
School teams, known as the Yellow Jackets, have won the State Championship in baseball nine times (1953, 1957, 1959, 1960, 1962 [spring and summer], 1966, 1973, 1993). They won the 2019 Class 2A State Championship in bowling.

== Clubs and societies ==
The school sponsors the following clubs and societies:

- ASTRA
- Anime Club
- Band
- Cheerleading
- Dance
- DECA
- Drama
- National Honor Society
- Newspaper
- Robotics
- Speech
- Yearbook

== Chanticleer Theater ==
In 1953, the Chanticleer Theater staged its first production. The Man Who Came to Dinner was performed in the Thomas Jefferson auditorium. The theater company continued to use the auditorium until 1958.

== Notable alumni ==
- Farrah Abraham, television personality and adult film star
- Walter Cassel, performer in the Metropolitan Opera
- Chris Hatcher, former professional baseball player
- Carl W. Hoffman, U.S. Marine Corps major general
- Tom Knudson, class of 1971, American, two-time Pulitzer Prize winner in 1985 and 1992
- Terry Lawless, studio and touring musician
- Brian Poldberg, professional baseball player and coach
- William Smith, Olympic gold medalist in wrestling
- Marjabelle Young Stewart, etiquette expert

== See also ==
- List of high schools in Iowa
