= West High School (Sioux City, Iowa) =

Public secondary school in Sioux City, Iowa, United States

Location
- 2001 Casselman St; Sioux City, Iowa 51103; United States; 42°30′39″N 96°26′49″W

Information
- School type: Public, Secondary
- Established: 1972
- School district: Sioux City Community School District
- Superintendent: Rod Earleywine
- Principal: Rebecca Rieken
- Teaching staff: 82.75 (FTE)
- Grades: 9-12
- Enrollment: 1,308 (2023-2024)
- Student to teacher ratio: 15.81
- Campus type: Suburban
- Colors: Green and White
- Mascot: Wolverine
- Website: west-high.siouxcityschools.org/o/west-high

West High School (commonly West, West High, or WHS) is a public high school located in Sioux City, Iowa, with an enrollment of approximately 1,404 students. The school is a part of the Sioux City Community School District and is one of three public high schools in Sioux City.

== History ==
West High School first opened its doors in 1972. Also in 1972, Sioux City's North High School opened, and a new building for Sioux City East High School opened. North High School and West High School replaced Sioux City's first high school, Central High (named Sioux City High School until the opening of East High School in 1918) which opened in 1892.

In 2000, West High's feeder middle school, West Middle School began construction of a new building directly west of West High School, which opened in January 2002. Unlike West High School, West Middle School opened in its original building in 1918. Due to construction of West Middle School, the track, baseball, and softball fields had to be moved and replaced, in order to make room for the new West Middle School.

On October 25, 2008, Sarah Palin (Vice-Presidential candidate for John McCain) held a rally in the school gym for the 2008 United States presidential election.

In October 2009. construction began on an expansion to the school building for 10 new brand new science classrooms. The expansion is directly integrating into the main academic classroom on the south side, towards the east end of the building. Similar to the original construction, Sioux City's East and North High schools also had new science wings, and are nearly identical in function and size. West High's science classes began on March 7, 2011, in the new addition.

West High was named the 2010 School of Character by Character Counts of Iowa.

In September 2011 the school's lunchroom "The Den" was opened.

In 2011, West High became a recipient of Iowa's Safe and Supportive Schools grant. Funds from this were used to improve the school.

In October 2015, Donald Trump held a rally in the school gym for the 2016 United States presidential election. This resulted in outrage and protests amongst students, given the school's largely Hispanic student body, and Trump's anti-immigration views.

== Athletics and arts ==
Former West High basketball standout Kirk Hinrich, former Chicago Bulls point guard, graduated in 1999. That year, the West High School basketball team won the Iowa State Basketball Championship. In 2009, the West High School basketball team competed for a spot in the Iowa State Championship for the first time since 1999. They lost to Sioux City East High School.

The Wolverines compete in the Missouri River Conference in the following sports:

- Baseball
- Basketball
- Bowling
- Cross country
- Football
- Golf
- Soccer
- Softball
- Swimming
- Tennis
- Track
- Volleyball
- Wrestling
- Hockey

In 1999, the boys' basketball team won the Class 4A State Championship.

From 2007 to 2011, the West High School jazz band competed for state jazz championship at the Iowa Jazz Championships in Des Moines, IA. They received 7th place in Class 4A in 2007. In 2015, the West High School Marching Band earned 1st place in class 2A at the Quad State Marching Competition in Vermillion. They also won Best Music, Best Color guard, and Best Visual Design.

As of 2009, the West High dance squad has entered in 136 competition routines at the Iowa Contest and has placed 1st 104 times, 2nd 24 times, 3rd 7 times, and 4th 1 time.

== See also ==
- List of high schools in Iowa
