= North High School (Sioux City, Iowa) =

Public secondary school in Sioux City, Iowa, United States

Location
- 4200 Cheyenne; Sioux City, Iowa 51104; United States; 42°32′36″N 96°23′30″W

Information
- School type: Public, Secondary
- Established: 1972
- School district: Sioux City School District
- Superintendent: Rod Earleywine
- Principal: Open Until Filled
- Teaching staff: 75.72 (FTE)
- Grades: 9-12
- Enrollment: 1,660 (2023-2024)
- Student to teacher ratio: 21.92
- Campus type: Suburban
- Colors: Red, White and Blue
- Mascot: Star
- Website: https://north-high.siouxcityschools.org/

North High School (commonly North, North High, or NHS) is a public high school located in Sioux City, Iowa with an enrollment of approximately 1,500 students. The school is a part of the Sioux City School District and is one of three public high schools in Sioux City.

The school mascot is Stars, and their colors are red and blue.

== Athletics ==
The Stars competes in the Missouri River Conference in the following sports:

- Badminton
- Baseball
  - 2009 Class 4A State Champions
- Basketball
  - Girls' 2-time Class 4A State Champions (2007, 2009)
- Bowling
  - Boys' Class AA State Champions (1990)
- Cheer
- Cross Country
- E-sports
- Football
- Golf
- Ping-Pong
- Soccer
- Softball
- Swimming
- Tennis
- Track and Field
- Volleyball
  - 1982 Class 2A State Champions
- Wrestling

Jacqui Kalin led the school basketball team to a Class 4A Iowa State Championship in 2007. She holds the school records for assists in a season (146) and career (324), and for free throws in a career (245), and holds the school and city record in the 400-meter hurdles.

== Bus service ==
The school is serviced by Sioux City Transit, which is open to all fare-paying passengers Monday to Friday during the school year.

== Fine Arts Programs ==
The school has programs for band, choir, drama, orchestra, and speech.

In 2026, 11 students were accepted into the Iowa All State Choir. This was the most students accepted in recent school history.

North also provides a vocal jazz program and hosts Jazz Sux, a jazz clinic ran by West High School and North High School.

== Notable alumni ==
- Brittni Donaldson, current assistant coach of the Portland Fire and former assistant coach for the Toronto Raptors
- Jacqui Kalin (born 1989), American-Israeli professional basketball player
- Ted Waitt, co-founder of Gateway Computers
- Daniel Tillo, former pitcher in the Kansas City Royals organization
- Matt Chatham, former Linebacker for New England Patriots and New York Jets
- Lori Petty, American actress and director, noted for her roles in the films Point Break (1991), A League of Their Own (1992), Free Willy (1993)
- Kyle Thousand, sports agent
- Steve Warnstadt, former Iowa state senator

== See also ==
- List of high schools in Iowa
