= Farrah Abraham =

American reality TV personality (born 1991)

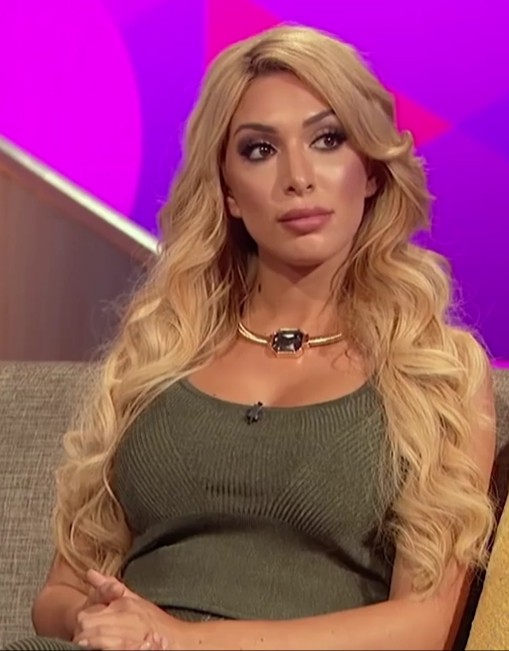
- Abraham in 2016
- Born: Farrah Laurel Abraham; May 31, 1991 (age 35); Omaha, Nebraska, U.S.
- Occupation: Television personality
- Years active: 2008–present
- Television: 16 and Pregnant; Teen Mom; Couples Therapy; Celebrity Big Brother
- Children: 1
- Website: farrahabraham.com

Farrah Laurel Abraham (born May 31, 1991) is an American television personality and businesswoman. Raised in Council Bluffs, Iowa, Abraham received public attention after being cast in the MTV reality television series 16 and Pregnant in 2009, which documented the pregnancies and first months of motherhood for several young women. Later that year, she was cast in the spin-off series Teen Mom, and appeared in each of its four seasons until its conclusion in 2012, later returning for its reboot in 2015.

She has since appeared in numerous television programs, released a studio album and memoir, both titled My Teenage Dream Ended, (with the book reaching The New York Times bestseller list) and worked in adult film, mainly with Vivid Entertainment.

== Early life ==
Farrah Abraham was born in Omaha, Nebraska, and raised in Council Bluffs, Iowa. Her father, Michael Abraham, is of Syrian and Italian descent. Her mother, Debra Danielsen, is of Danish and Sicilian ancestry. She grew up with her half-sister, Ashley Danielsen. She attended Thomas Jefferson High School, where she was a cheerleader. Her parents divorced in 2010 and her mother married David Merz in 2017.

== Career ==
=== 2008–2012: Career beginnings with 16 and Pregnant and Teen Mom ===
In 2008, Abraham, then 17, was selected to appear on the MTV show 16 and Pregnant, a reality series that aimed to document the lives of pregnant teenagers across the United States. News of her pregnancy caused issues between her and her mother, Debra Danielsen, with Danielsen calling her daughter a whore and preventing her from obtaining an abortion; being pregnant, Abraham was forced to discontinue her cheerleading. Furthermore, during filming, Derek Underwood, the father of her child, died in a car accident. Abraham gave birth to the couple's daughter, Sophia Laurent Abraham, on February 23, 2009. Abraham's episode of 16 and Pregnant aired on June 17, 2009.

Later that year she was cast in the spin-off series Teen Mom; it followed Abraham as well as Maci Bookout, Catelynn Lowell and Amber Portwood, who also appeared on episodes of 16 and Pregnant, during their first years of motherhood. The series premiered on December 8, 2009. Abraham and her mother are seen to have a rocky relationship throughout Teen Mom, and Danielsen was charged with assault in an Iowa court for hitting her in January 2010. Abraham started seeing a therapist to discuss her relationship with her family as well as the death of her daughter's father, Derek Underwood. She eventually proved to his family through a paternity test that Derek was Sophia's father, at which point his mother filed a lawsuit for grandparents' visitation rights, despite having had no previous contact with Sophia.

In 2011, Abraham began attending the Art Institute of Fort Lauderdale in Florida, where she earned an associate's degree in culinary arts and management. She later launched a line of pasta sauce called "Mom & Me".

=== 2012–2014: Other ventures, adult film, and television appearances ===
On August 1, 2012, Abraham ventured into the music industry with the release of her debut studio album, My Teenage Dream Ended. It received overwhelmingly negative reviews from contemporary music critics, but has since been reappraised as avant-garde outsider art. Abraham released a memoir of the same title two weeks later. After four seasons, the series finale of Teen Mom aired on August 29, 2012.

In 2013, Abraham appeared in the pornographic video Farrah Superstar: Backdoor Teen Mom, with male porn star James Deen, which was distributed by Vivid Video as being a homemade sex video that "leaked", though Abraham later confirmed that the "leak" was just a marketing gimmick. In April, Abraham was then invited on Dr. Phil to discuss the tape with her parents.

In January 2014, Abraham was cast for the fourth season of Couples Therapy. However, Brian Dawe claimed that he was hired by Abraham to appear as her on-screen boyfriend and ultimately did not appear on the program alongside her. Abraham consequently became the only cast member in series history to continue therapy without a partner, and was refocused on repairing her relationship with her mother.

In February, Abraham appeared in a second porn video with Deen, Farrah 2: Backdoor and More. She reportedly earned $1 million selling her first sex tape with Deen. Later that month, Abraham appeared in the TV special Being Farrah, a continuation of Teen Mom; Bookout, Lowell, and Portwood were featured in the specials Being Maci, Being Catelynn, and Being Amber, respectively. Their successes prompted MTV to consider reviving the series without Abraham, who the other women were concerned was an inappropriate influence on their children.

In March 2014, Abraham returned to the music industry with the release of the song "Blowin'" and the simultaneous premiere of its accompanying music video. She stated that she treats music as a "hobby, not my career move." In August 2014, she signed a contract with Palazio's Gentleman's Club in Austin, Texas, for $544,000 for a residency until New Year's Eve.

=== 2015–2018: Teen Mom OG, business ventures, and continued television success ===
In January 2015, MTV confirmed Abraham would return for the Teen Mom spin-off titled Teen Mom OG. The series premiered on March 23, 2015.

In August, Abraham participated in the sixteenth series of the British television series Celebrity Big Brother, representing Team USA. On September 18, she became the fifth housemate to be evicted. She had spent 23 days in the house.

On September 22, 2015, Abraham appeared as a panelist on the Celebrity Big Brother's Bit on the Side after-show and got into a heated argument with fellow panelist Aisleyne Horgan-Wallace. The show was taken off air 10 minutes early after a physical altercation between Abraham and Horgan-Wallace ensued. Abraham and Janice Dickinson were given police cautions by Hertfordshire Police.

In May 2016, Abraham opened a frozen yogurt shop, FroCo Fresh & Frozen, in Lakeway, Texas. In September, she opened two more retail stores: Sophia Laurent Children's Boutique, named for her daughter, and a furniture store called Furnished by Farrah. All three businesses closed in 2018.

In 2017, Abraham and her parents, Debra and Michael, all appeared on the We TV reality series Marriage Boot Camp Reality Stars: Family Edition.

In October 2017, during the filming of the seventh season of Teen Mom OG, Abraham was given an ultimatum by executive producer Morgan J. Freeman to choose between working in the adult entertainment industry or the show after she appeared in live webcam videos hosted by pornographic streaming platform CamSoda. She ultimately chose to terminate her contract with Teen Mom OG. She was later replaced by Bristol Palin and Cheyenne Floyd.

In December 2018, a year after she was fired from Teen Mom OG, Abraham returned to the network to partake in the dating reality series Ex on the Beach for its second season.

=== Political career ===
On January 15, 2026, Abraham filed paperwork in the 2026 Austin municipal elections in City Council District 5. In a subsequent interview on TMZ, Abraham said she was running for mayor of Austin in 2026, even though the next mayoral election was not scheduled until 2028. She placed in fourth place, receiving 10.05% of votes.

== Personal life and legal issues ==
In February 2018, Abraham filed a lawsuit against MTV's parent company, Viacom, seeking $5 million alleging she was "sex-shamed" and discriminated against because she did not conform to gender stereotypes. The lawsuit was settled the following month.

On June 13, 2018, at around 1:20 a.m., the Beverly Hills Police Department were dispatched to the Beverly Hills Hotel responding to a call regarding a disturbance inside of the hotel restaurant. A male security guard working for the hotel alleged Abraham struck him in the face after he asked her to leave. Abraham was then arrested for misdemeanor battery and trespassing. In August, she pleaded guilty to one misdemeanor count of resisting. She was subsequently sentenced to two years probation and five days of community service, and 12 hours of anger management classes.

In August, promoter Damon Feldman announced Abraham's participation in the "Celebrity Boxing Showdown for Bullying" charity event, where she would box television personality Nicole Alexander. In November, Abraham dropped out of the event after claiming Feldman's camp was in breach of contract. In January 2019, People Magazine reported Feldman was suing Abraham for $12,000.

In April 2021, Abraham filed a report to the Palm Beach Police Department alleging she was drugged and raped by politician and then Windsor, California Dominic Foppoli while visiting Palm Beach, Florida in March. Abraham explained she had been at a wine tasting event with Foppoli and had no other memory of the night. Palm Beach detectives suspended their investigation in January 2022 due to "insufficient evidence," citing Abraham's lack of memory. Three hours after Foppoli was questioned about the allegations, he resigned as mayor. In December 2022, Abraham filed a lawsuit in the Sonoma County Superior Court against Foppoli. California Attorney General Rob Bonta declined to pursue criminal charges against Foppoli in 2024, and Abraham then filed a civil lawsuit set for trial in 2026.

In January 2022, Abraham was arrested after it was reported that she assaulted a nightclub security guard. In October 2023, she was sentenced to 18 months probation with mandatory supervision and 40 hours of community service for the incident.

== Filmography ==
Year	Title	Role	Notes
Television
2009	16 and Pregnant	Herself	"Farrah" (season 1, episode 2)
2009–2012	Teen Mom	Herself	Main cast member (seasons 1–4)
2013-2015	The Doctors	Herself	Guest
2013	Bethenny	Herself	Guest
2013	Dr. Phil	Herself	Guest
2014	Couples Therapy	Herself	Main cast member (season 4)
2014	Being Farrah	Herself	Television special
2015–2018	Teen Mom OG	Herself	Main cast member (season 5–7)
2015	Celebrity Big Brother	Herself	Housemate; representing the USA
2015	Botched	Herself	Guest
2017	Marriage Boot Camp: Reality Stars Family Edition	Herself	Main cast member
2017	MTV's Single AF	Herself	Main cast member
2018	Face the Truth	Herself	Guest
2018–2019	Ex on the Beach	Herself	Main cast member (season 2)
2022	Teen Mom: Family Reunion	Herself	Guest; "Welcome to Farrah-Dise"
Film
2013	Farrah Superstar: Backdoor Teen Mom	Herself	Adult film (with James Deen)
2014	Farrah 2: Backdoor and More	Herself	Adult film (with James Deen)
2017	Adam K	Karen Sims	Film debut
2017	Axeman 2: Overkill	Fannie Rae Baker	Supporting role
2019	I Got the Hook-Up 2	Officer 2	

== Discography ==
=== Studio albums ===
List of studio albums
Title	Album details
My Teenage Dream Ended	Released: August 1, 2012; Label: Self-released; Formats: Digital download, streaming

=== Singles ===
List of singles
Title	Year	Album
"Finally Getting Up from Rock Bottom"	2012	My Teenage Dream Ended
"Blowin"	2014	Non-album singles
"Jingle Bell Rock" (featuring Sophia Abraham)	2020	Non-album singles
"Holly Jolly Christmas" (featuring Sophia Abraham)	2020	Non-album singles

== Awards and nominations ==
Award	Year	Category	Nominated work	Result
EOTM Awards	2013	Outstanding Literary Work	My Teenage Dream Ended	Won
AVN Awards	2014	Best Anal Sex Scene	Farrah Superstar: Backdoor Teen Mom	Nominated

== Published works ==
- My Teenage Dream Ended (2012)
- Passy Perfume (2012)
- Celebrity Sex Tape: In the Making (2014)
- Celebrity Sex Tape: The Secret's Out (2014)
- Celebrity Sex Tape: Love Through Limelight (2015)
