= Missouri River Conference =

Iowa High School athletic conference

- Conference: IHSAA / IGHSAU
- Founded: 2000
- No. of teams: 9
- Headquarters: Sioux City, Iowa
- Region: Western Iowa
- Website: www.missouririverconf.org

Locations
- Sioux City Metro Council Bluffs Area

The Missouri River Activities Conference (also called MRAC) is a high school athletic and activities conference whose members are located in either the Sioux City Metropolitan Area or the Omaha-Council Bluffs Metropolitan Area, both located along the Missouri River on the border of western Iowa, United States.

== Member schools ==
Institution	Location	Colors	Affiliation	2026-2027 BEDS	Boys Classification	Girls Classification	Mascot
Bishop Heelan	Sioux City		Private, Catholic	377	3A	4A	Crusaders
Abraham Lincoln	Council Bluffs		Public	939	4A	5A	Lynx
Thomas Jefferson	Council Bluffs		Public	839	4A	5A	Yellow Jackets
Le Mars Community	Le Mars		Public	478	3A	4A	Bulldogs
Lewis Central	Council Bluffs		Public	772	4A	4A	Titans
Sergeant Bluff-Luton	Sergeant Bluff		Public	401	3A	4A	Warriors
East	Sioux City		Public	1,093	4A	5A	Black Raiders
North	Sioux City		Public	1,208	4A	5A	Stars
West	Sioux City		Public	892	4A	5A	Wolverines

Since Iowa is the only state in the nation that maintains separate governing bodies for boys' and girls' athletics, the classifications are different for each gender.

The Iowa High School Athletic Association is divided into classes (from largest to smallest) 4A, 3A, 2A, and 1A (A, and 8-player are also included for football only) while the Iowa Girls High School Athletic Union is divided into classes (from largest to smallest) 5A, 4A, 3A, 2A, and 1A.

Five of the eight members of the MRAC conference are part of the largest class for boy boys and girls athletics; the exceptions - Bishop Heelan Catholic, Le Mars Community, and Sergeant-Bluff Luton, are part of Class 3A for boys and either class 4A or 3A for girls athletics.

== History ==
For most of their athletics histories, the schools of the Missouri River Activities Conference were in other conferences. Beginning in the early 1970s, Sioux City schools began to compete with schools in Sioux Falls, South Dakota, as a members of the boys-only Sioux Interstate Conference. In the late 1970s, the Sioux Delta Conference was formed between the Sioux City schools, LeMars Community, and Hull Western Christian to facilitate girls' athletic competition. A separate intrastate conference was necessary because the South Dakota High School Athletic Association conducted its girls' basketball tournament in the fall and volleyball tournament in the winter, opposite of many bordering states.

From the 1920s to the 1950s C.B. Abraham Lincoln and Sioux City East competed with three Omaha high schools (Central, South and Tech) and Lincoln High in the Missouri Valley Conference. Sioux City Central, which closed in 1975, was also a member.

In spring 1997, the South Dakota High School Activities Association effectively closed its borders to interstate athletic competition, forcing the dissolution of the Sioux Interstate Conference. The Sioux Delta Conference also dissolved that spring as both LeMars Community and Hull Western Christian had by this time found homes in the Lakes Conference, leaving the four Sioux City schools out in the cold.

The Council Bluffs schools, meanwhile, were once part of the Omaha metro league which included numerous schools in Nebraska. After bowing out of the Omaha metro league, the two schools became charter members of the River Cities Conference, a league that included Nebraska schools such as Beatrice, Ralston, South Sioux City, Omaha Gross, Omaha Roncalli, and Omaha Skutt.

With few options due to their size as 4A football schools, the Sioux City schools and Heelan sought out and were denied membership in both the Central Iowa Metro League and the River Cities Conference. Undaunted, the schools petitioned the Iowa Department of Education for placement in an athletic conference. As a result of those proceedings, the Missouri River Conference was formed to meet the needs of the Sioux City schools, pulling the Council Bluffs schools out of the River Cities Conference to complete the six-school lineup.

In 2010, Sergeant Bluff-Luton, a founding member of the War Eagle Conference in 1979, began competing as the league's seventh school.

LeMars Community announced in February 2018 that it would be joining the conference as the eighth member for the 2019–2020 academic year, leaving the Lakes Conference. Hawkeye 10 Conference members Lewis Central and Glenwood were also invited, but declined, opting to continue competing in the Hawkeye Ten Conference.

On June 20, 2025, the MRAC again offered Lewis Central Community School District and Glenwood Community School District to join as well as two other Hawkeye 10 Conference schools, Harlan Community School District and Denison-Schleswig. On August 19, 2025, Lewis Central accepted the invitation and will officially join for the 2026-2027 school year. At about the same time, Denison-Schleswig, Glenwood and Harlan each declined their invitations, opting to remain in the Hawkeye 10.

== Sports ==
The conference offers the following sports:

- Fall — volleyball, boys' cross-country, girls' cross-country, boys' golf and girls' swimming.
- Winter — Boys' basketball, girls' basketball, bowling, wrestling and boys' swimming.
- Spring — Boys' track and field, girls' track and field, boys' soccer, girls' soccer, boys' tennis, girls' tennis and girls' golf.
- Summer — Baseball and softball.
