= My Teenage Dream Ended =

Book by Farrah Abraham

Studio album by Farrah Abraham
- Released: August 1, 2012
- Genres: Outsider; witch house; house; dance-pop; avant-garde; noise; proto-hyperpop
- Length: 27:24
- Producer: Fredrick M. Cuevas

Singles from My Teenage Dream Ended
- 1. "Finally Getting Up from Rock Bottom" Released: August 3, 2012

My Teenage Dream Ended
- Author: Farrah Abraham
- Language: English
- Subject: Autobiography
- Publisher: MTV Press
- Publication date: August 14, 2012
- Publication place: United States
- Media type: Hardcover; E-book
- Pages: 240
- ISBN: 978-1576875988

My Teenage Dream Ended is the title of both the debut autobiographical book and the accompanying album by American reality television personality, singer, and writer Farrah Abraham. The album was released on August 1, 2012, and the book was published 13 days later.

The book was commercially successful, landing at number 11 on the New York Times Best Seller list. The album was met with strongly negative response from general audiences, as well as both bewilderment and acclaim from contemporary music critics, who considered it to be a bizarre example of outsider art. It was placed on year-end lists from The Guardian and Tiny Mix Tapes, who also placed it at number 46 on their list of favorite releases of the decade.

== Background and production ==
Abraham came to prominence due to her role in the 2009 MTV reality television show 16 and Pregnant, as well as its spin-off series Teen Mom, also by MTV. Abraham met mixing engineer FRDRK (Fredrick M. Cuevas) at the post-production facility of 16 and Pregnant. Several months after, she approached Cuevas and asked him to produce a record for her, inspired by the song "Cinema", by Benny Benassi.

Abraham recorded her vocals for the album to a click track, while the production of the music was handled separately. In an interview with The Fader, Cuevas stated: "Like, she'd heard it before and approved it for that song, but as she was recording we never had the music on." Abraham also wanted the Auto-Tune effects on her vocals to sound "edgy", so worked with Cuevas to make them more aggressive.

Abraham released My Teenage Dream Ended on August 1, 2012, with its first single, "Finally Getting Up from Rock Bottom", being released two days later through In Touch Weekly magazine. On August 14, 2012, the homonymous autobiography was published by MTV Press. It was a relative commercial success, reaching number 11 on the New York Times Best Seller list.

== Themes ==
The book chronicles her teenage pregnancy and the problems she faced during the time, including depression, drug use, the arrest of her father, and the death of Derek Underwood, her on-again, off-again boyfriend with whom she had a daughter. The music album is a companion work to her autobiography, paralleling its themes; each of the ten songs shares a title with a chapter of her book. The album contains recurring motifs, such as "plucking flower games" like "He loves me... he loves me not".

== Critical response and legacy ==
Upon release, the accompanying album received an overwhelmingly negative response from audiences. It has been widely criticized for its extensively Auto-Tuned vocals and bland production. Her song "On My Own" was derided as one of the worst works of pop music ever made, eclipsing Rebecca Black's "Friday". Feminist website Jezebel called the lead and sole single, "Finally Getting Up from Rock Bottom", "the most horrible combination of sounds to ever be assembled in the history of audio recording."

Professional ratings
Review scores
Source	Rating
Tiny Mix Tapes	4/5 marks

Despite garnering mockery in popular media, the arrhythmic and cheaply digitized presentation of deeply confessional lyrics was bewildering enough to be viewed as a contemporary example of outsider art. My Teenage Dream Ended was mostly met with acclaim from music critics, who considered it to be among the weirdest albums of the year. Most critics did not assign a score to the album; an editor note on Alex Macpherson's review of the album for Fact states that "we decided to run this review without a rating. It's such an anomaly ... that trying to fit it into any kind of scale seems pointless – there are no comparison points. Consider it either a 0/5 or a 5/5, depending on your perspective, tolerance and general sanity."

[My Teenage Dream Ended] is the sound of a postmodern nervous breakdown. In being so, paradoxically, it creates its own weird authenticity. Sonically, we encounter the fresh, shard-like ruins of contemporary dance-pop, each beat or fragment teasing but failing to resolve into regularity. Over this, Abraham intones in a voice masked by Auto-Tune so consistently and heavily applied that it speaks to the alienation of the recorded voice [...].

— Rowan Savage, writing for Tiny Mix Tapes

In The Wire, Andrew Nosnitsky called it a "haunting and fascinating mess of outsider pop music". Writing for The Atlantic, David Cooper Moore suggested that the album "is to teen angst what Eraserhead was to domestic angst", making it "a dark and compelling experiment in abstracting and compressing the vicissitudes of 'high school drama.'" The Village Voice compared it to critically acclaimed witch house band Salem. The Guardian's David Renshaw described the album as "an agonising, disconcerting clatter" and "as if someone is translating chart music into an alien language and back again." Discussing the album's positive reception among avant-garde circles, Renshaw concluded: "All in all, it's as if Joey Essex had ditched TOWIE to record an album with Autechre and Lars von Trier."

In a commentary for Dummy, Steph Kretowicz praised My Teenage Dream Ended for "its realistic portrayal of a mind mashed by mass media" and accidental camp aesthetic, stating that Abraham "present[s] a truly thought-provoking challenge to the status quo". On the other hand, she commented that the album "offers few dynamic shifts, no hooks and nary a sustained rhythm"; and opined that it "certainly" was not the most challenging record of the year, favoring Laurel Halo's Quarantine and Maria Minerva's Will Happiness Find Me? instead. The A.V. Club panned the album and labeled it "the least essential album of 2012", calling it "terrible" and "cringeworthy", and dismissed the album's avant-garde status as "giving Abraham way too much credit".

In 2014, Mitchell Sunderland of Vice interviewed Abraham, and referred to My Teenage Dream Ended as a "critically acclaimed noise album", to which she replied "I just create therapeutic music." In a 2017 review for Charli XCX's Pop 2 mixtape, Meaghan Garvey of Pitchfork retrospectively summarized: "Sweepingly ridiculed as one of 2012's worst albums, that judgment, five years later, feels wildly narrow-minded. It is a baffling work, to be sure: frantic layers of dubstep, EDM, witch-house, and breakbeats seem to run in the opposite direction as Abraham's absurdly AutoTuned narratives about surviving the death of her husband. [...] After my first full spin of Pop 2, I couldn't shake the thought: 'This sounds like Farrah, but good.'" In late 2017, Duncan Cooper of The Fader wrote that "Farrah Abraham's pop music should make her an avant-garde icon."

=== Accolades ===
Accolades for My Teenage Dream Ended
Publication	Accolade	Rank	Ref.
The Guardian	Best Albums of 2012	32	
Tiny Mix Tapes	Favorite 50 Albums of 2012	33	
Tiny Mix Tapes	Favorite 100 Music Releases of the Decade	46	

== Track listing ==
No.	Title	Length
1.	"The Phone Call That Changed My Life"	2:50
2.	"After Prom"	2:59
3.	"Caught in the Act"	1:44
4.	"With Out This Ring..."	2:53
5.	"Liar Liar"	3:37
6.	"Unplanned Parenthood"	2:31
7.	"Searching for Closure"	3:49
8.	"On My Own"	2:55
9.	"The Sunshine State"	1:44
10.	"Finally Getting Up from Rock Bottom"	2:22
Total length:		27:24
