= List of awards and nominations received by the Safdie brothers =

Safdie brothers awards and nominations
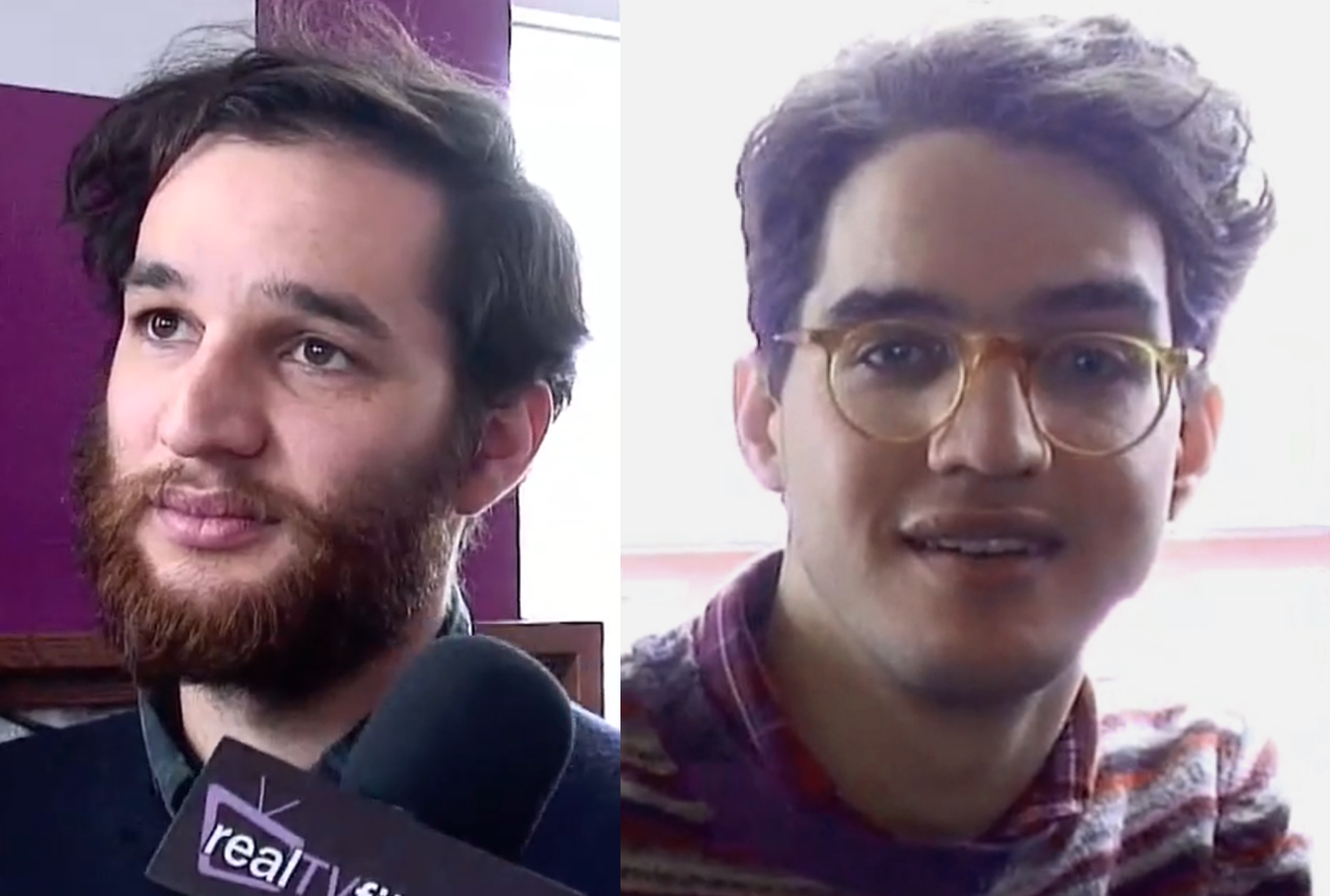
- Safdie brothers at the 2010 Sundance Film Festival
Awards and nominations
Major Awards	Wins	Nominations
Academy Awards	0	4
AFI Fest	0	1
Awards Circuit Community Awards	1	1
Black Reel Awards	0	2
Cannes Film Festival	0	2
Critics' Choice Movie Awards	0	6
Gijón International Film Festival	0	1
Golden Globes	0	2
Gotham Awards	0	7
Independent Spirit Awards	4	11
Los Angeles Film Critics Association	1	2
National Board of Review	1	1
New York Film Critics Circle	1	1
Primetime Emmy Awards	1	3
San Diego Film Critics Society	1	3
Seattle Film Critics Society	0	6
Stockholm International Film Festival	0	2
Sundance Film Festival	1	2
Venice Film Festival	1	2
Wins	12
Nominations	59

The following is a list of awards and nominations received by the Safdie brothers.

== Academy Awards ==
Academy Awards (Josh only)
Year	Nominated work	Category	Result	Ref.
2026	Marty Supreme	Best Picture (Note: Shared with Ronald Bronstein, Eli Bush, Anthony Katagas, and Timothée Chalamet)	Nominated	
2026	Marty Supreme	Best Director	Nominated	
2026	Marty Supreme	Best Original Screenplay (Note: Shared with Ronald Bronstein)	Nominated	
2026	Marty Supreme	Best Film Editing	Nominated	

== AFI Fest ==
AFI Fest
Year	Nominated work	Category	Result	Ref.
2014	Heaven Knows What	American Independents	Nominated	

== Awards Circuit Community Awards ==
Awards Circuit Community Awards
Year	Nominated work	Category	Result	Ref.
2017	Good Time	Honorable Mentions	Won	

== Black Reel Awards ==
Black Reel Awards
Year	Nominated work	Category	Result	Ref.
2014	Lenny Cooke	Outstanding Independent Documentary	Nominated	
2026	The Smashing Machine (Benny)	Outstanding Editing	Nominated	

== Cannes Film Festival ==
Cannes Film Festival
Year	Nominated work	Category	Result	Ref.
2009	Go Get Some Rosemary	C.I.C.A.E. Award	Nominated	
2017	Good Time	Palme d'Or	Nominated	

== Critics' Choice Movie Awards ==
Critics' Choice Movie Awards
Year	Nominated work	Category	Result	Ref.
2020	Uncut Gems	Best Director	Nominated	
2020	Uncut Gems	Best Editing	Nominated	
2026	Marty Supreme (Josh only)	Best Picture	Nominated	
2026	Marty Supreme (Josh only)	Best Director	Nominated	
2026	Marty Supreme (Josh only)	Best Original Screenplay	Nominated	
2026	Marty Supreme (Josh only)	Best Editing	Nominated	

== Gijón International Film Festival ==
Gijón International Film Festival
Year	Nominated work	Category	Result	Ref.
2009	Go Get Some Rosemary	Best Film	Nominated	

== Golden Globe Awards ==
Golden Globe Awards (Josh only)
Year	Nominated work	Category	Result	Ref.
2026	Marty Supreme	Best Motion Picture – Musical or Comedy	Nominated	
2026	Marty Supreme	Best Screenplay	Nominated	

== Gotham Awards ==
Gotham Awards
Year	Nominated work	Category	Result	Ref.
2015	Heaven Knows What	Best Feature (Note: Shared with Oscar Boyson & Sebastian Bear-McClard)	Nominated	
2015	Heaven Knows What	Audience Award	Nominated	
2017	Good Time	Best Feature (Note: Shared with Paris Kassidokostas-Latsis, Terry Dougas, Sebastian Bear-McClard & Oscar Boyson)	Nominated	
2017	Good Time	Audience Award	Nominated	
2019	Uncut Gems	Best Feature (Note: Shared with Scott Rudin, Eli Bush & Sebastian Bear-McClard)	Nominated	
2019	Uncut Gems	Audience Award	Nominated	
2025	Ren Faire	Breakthrough Nonfiction Series (Note: Shared with Ronald Bronstein, Eli Bush, Dani Bernfeld, Lance Oppenheim, David Gauvey Herbert, Nancy Abraham, Lisa Heller, and Sara Rodriguez)	Nominated	

== Independent Spirit Awards ==
Independent Spirit Awards
Year	Nominated work	Category	Result	Ref.
2011	Go Get Some Rosemary	John Cassavetes Award (Note: Shared with Casey Neistat & Tom Scott)	Won	
2016	Heaven Knows What	Best Editing	Nominated	
2016	Heaven Knows What	John Cassavetes Award (Note: Shared with Ronald Bronstein, Oscar Boyson & Sebastian Bear-McClard)	Nominated	
2018	Good Time	Best Director	Nominated	
2018	Good Time	Best Editing	Nominated	
2018	Good Time	Best Supporting Male (Benny)	Nominated	
2020	Uncut Gems	Best Director	Won	
2020	Uncut Gems	Best Editing	Won	
2020	Uncut Gems	Best Screenplay	Nominated	
2025	Ren Faire	Best New Non-Scripted or Documentary Series (Note: Shared with Ronald Bronstein, Eli Bush, Dani Bernfeld, Lance Oppenheim, David Gauvey Herbert, Nancy Abraham, Lisa Heller, Sara Rodriguez, Abigail Rowe, Christian Vasquez, and Max Allman)	Nominated	
2026	Pee-wee as Himself	Best New Non-Scripted or Documentary Series (Note: Shared with Matt Wolf, Emma Tillinger Koskoff, Ronald Bronstein, Eli Bush, Paul Reubens (posthumous), Candace Tomarken, Kyle Martin, Nancy Abraham, Lisa Heller, and Sara Rodriguez)	Won	

== Los Angeles Film Critics Association ==
Los Angeles Film Critics Association
Year	Nominated work	Category	Result	Ref.
2019	Uncut Gems	Best Editing	Runner-up	
2025	Marty Supreme (Josh)	Best Editing	Won	

== National Board of Review ==
National Board of Review
Year	Nominated work	Category	Result	Ref.
2019	Uncut Gems	Best Original Screenplay	Won	

== New York Film Critics Circle ==
New York Film Critics Circle
Year	Nominated work	Category	Result	Ref.
2019	Uncut Gems	Best Director	Won	
2025	Marty Supreme	Best Screenplay	Won	

== Primetime Emmy Awards ==
Primetime Emmy Awards
Year	Nominated work	Category	Result	Ref.
2024	Telemarketers	Outstanding Documentary or Nonfiction Series	Nominated	
2025	Pee-wee as Himself	Outstanding Documentary or Nonfiction Special	Won	
2025	Adam Sandler: Love You (Josh)	Outstanding Variety Special (Pre-Recorded)	Nominated	

== San Diego Film Critics Society ==
San Diego Film Critics Society
Year	Nominated work	Category	Result	Ref.
2019	Uncut Gems	Best Director	Won	
2019	Uncut Gems	Best Editing	Runner-up	
2019	Uncut Gems	Best Original Screenplay	Runner-up	

== Seattle Film Critics Society ==
Seattle Film Critics Society
Year	Nominated work	Category	Result	Ref.
2019	Uncut Gems	Best Director	Nominated	
2019	Uncut Gems	Best Film Editing	Won	
2025	Marty Supreme (Josh)	Best Picture	Nominated	
2025	Marty Supreme (Josh)	Best Director	Nominated	
2025	Marty Supreme (Josh)	Best Original Screenplay	Nominated	
2025	Marty Supreme (Josh)	Best Film Editing	Nominated	

== Stockholm International Film Festival ==
Stockholm International Film Festival
Year	Nominated work	Category	Result	Ref.
2012	The Black Balloon	Best Short Film	Nominated	
2014	Heaven Knows What	Best Film	Nominated	

== Sundance Film Festival ==
Sundance Film Festival
Year	Nominated work	Category	Result	Ref.
2012	The Black Balloon	Short Film Jury Prize	Won	
2012	The Black Balloon	Short Film Grand Jury Prize	Nominated	

== Venice Film Festival ==
Venice Film Festival (Benny only)
Year	Nominated work	Category	Result	Ref.
2025	The Smashing Machine	Golden Lion	Nominated	
2025	The Smashing Machine	Silver Lion	Won	
