= Paul Grimstad =

American composer, writer and actor

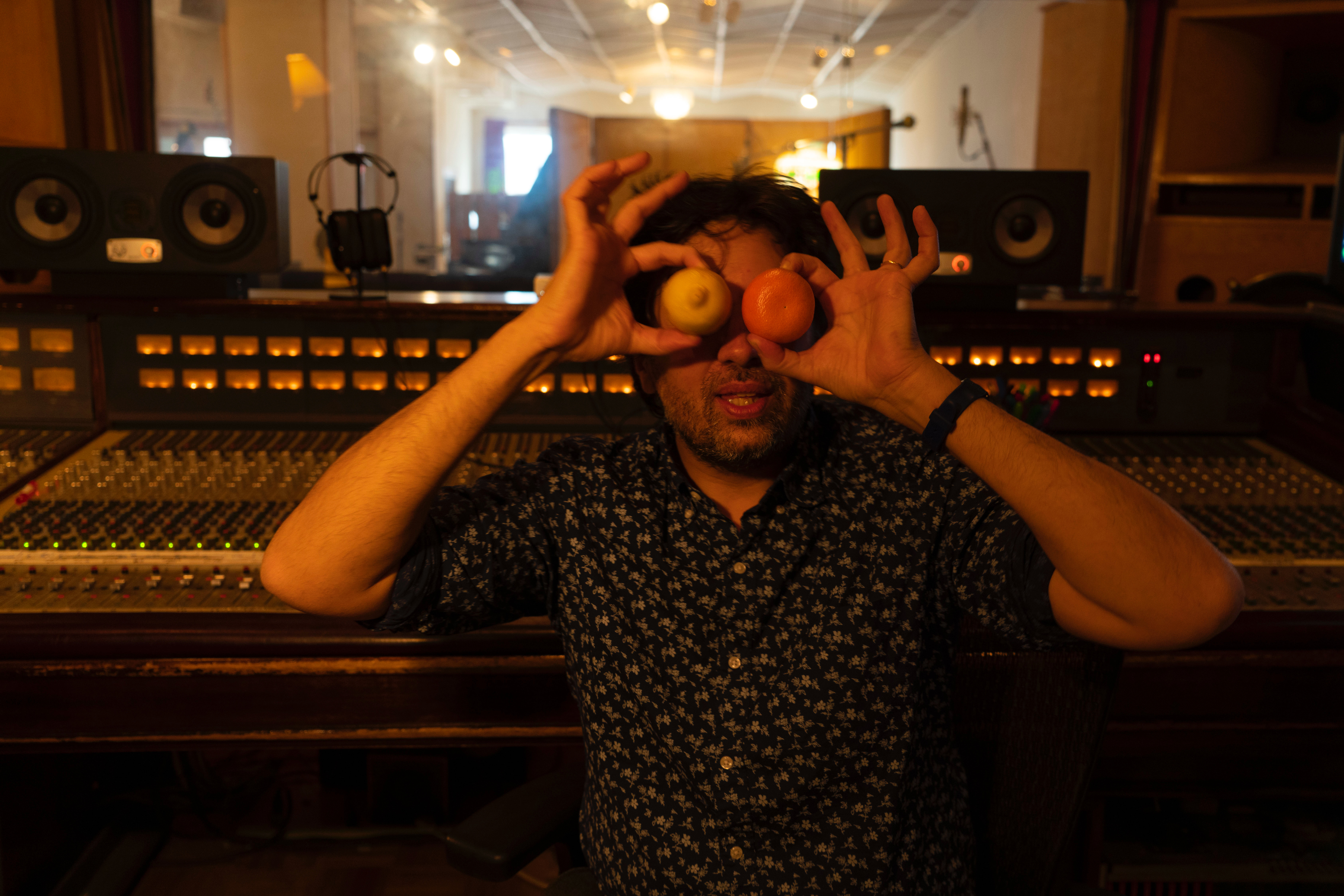
Grimstad at Sear Sound in New York, 2023

Paul Grimstad is an American writer, musician, academic and actor. He is currently Senior Lecturer in the Humanities Program at Yale University.

== Early life and education ==
Grimstad was born in the unincorporated village of Branch Wisconsin in 1973. He is of Norwegian and Italian descent. Grimstad earned his undergraduate degree from the University of Wisconsin–Madison. He later earned a Ph.D at New York University.

== Career ==
=== Academia ===
Grimstad joined the faculty at Yale University in 2007, initially in the Department of English, and later moved to the Humanities Program. In 2013, he published the book Experience and Experimental Writing with Oxford University Press. He currently serves as the Director of Undergraduate Studies for the Humanities major. In 2014, he received the Sarai Ribicoff '79 Award for Teaching Excellence. He has also taught at Columbia University and New York University.

=== Music and film composition ===
Grimstad composed the original scores for several independent films.

The Sweet East's opening credits sequence features actress Talia Ryder singing Grimstad's original song "Evening Mirror," composed specifically for the film.

Outside of film, Grimstad composes and produces original songs in the avant-pop genre. On September 30, 2025, Grimstad will simultaneously release SONGS, a new avant-pop record, Music For Film, a compilation of his film score work, and Live at Baby's All Right, a live EP.

Grimstad composed the music for the opening sequence of Sarah Sherman's HBO comedy special Sarah Squirm Live + In the Flesh.

=== Acting ===
In addition to composing the film's score, Grimstad played a supporting role in Ronald Bronstein’s 2007 independent film Frownland. The film was later added to the Criterion Collection.

Grimstad appears in director Paul Thomas Anderson’s film One Battle After Another as the character Howard Sommerville. He also has a role in the Josh Safdie film Marty Supreme.

=== Writing and cultural criticism ===
Grimstad is also a literary and cultural critic whose essays have appeared in numerous prominent publications. His work covers topics such as jazz, contemporary music, literary aesthetics, and audiobook culture. Select contributions include:

- "Jazz Is Freedom" — The Baffler (2022)
- "Leave Alexa Alone" — The Paris Review (2016)
- "Confessions of an Audiobook Addict" — The New Yorker
- "On Frank Zappa", "On Tom Verlaine", "On Robert Ashley" — n+1
- ”Lisa Simpson and Other Fans of Thomas Pynchon on the Writer's Most Memorable Scenes” - The New York Times

Grimstad's novel Cold Fusion is forthcoming from Simon & Schuster in early 2027.

== Discography ==
=== Film scores ===
- Frownland (2007)
- Heaven Knows What (2014)
- Jobe’z World (2018)
- Thirst Street (2017)
- The Sweet East (2023)

For Thirst Street, Grimstad composed a synth-heavy score inspired by Gabriel Yared, and contributed an original song performed in the film by actress Lindsay Burdge.

=== Albums and singles ===
- The Other's Buzz (2001)
- Blammo! (2009)
- Wams & Bams (2012)
- Mysteroid (2017)
- "Evening Mirror" (single) (2024)
- SONGS (2025)
- Music For Film (2025)
- Live at Baby's All Right (2025)

=== With Ex-Action Figures ===
- "Autobeauty" [PS 001] (Pink Slider Productions, 1994)
- Ex-Action Figures [MMR-007] (Mafia Money Records, 1996)
- A Lion And A Virgin In A Diamond Rocket [MMR-011] (Mafia Money Records, 1998)
- "The Trillionaires" [LBJ-25] (Saddle Creek Records, 1999)

== Podcasts and Social Media ==
Grimstad has appeared on various podcasts discussing music, audio engineering and acting

- Gaucho Amigos– Episode 33: "Stalking the Dread Moray Eel"
- n+1 Podcast – "On Frank Zappa"
- Q with Tim Power--"How a Yale Professor Ended Up in Two of the Years Biggest Movies"
