= Gotham Independent Film Awards 2025 =

Annual US film awards ceremony

35th Annual Gotham Film Awards
- Date: December 1, 2025
- Location: Cipriani Wall Street, New York
- Country: United States
- Presented by: The Gotham Film & Media Institute

Highlights
- Most wins: It Was Just an Accident (3)
- Most nominations: One Battle After Another (6)
- Best Feature: One Battle After Another
- Best Director: Jafar Panahi – It Was Just an Accident

The 35th Annual Gotham Film Awards, presented by the Gotham Film & Media Institute, were held on December 1, 2025, at Cipriani Wall Street in New York City.

The nominees were announced on October 28, 2025. One Battle After Another led the nominations with a record six, followed by If I Had Legs I'd Kick You with four, and It Was Just an Accident and No Other Choice, both with three each.

The film Frankenstein (Guillermo del Toro, Oscar Isaac, and Jacob Elordi), Noah Baumbach, Tessa Thompson, Luca Guadagnino and Julia Roberts, Hugh Jackman and Kate Hudson, Jeremy Allen White and Scott Cooper, and the cast of Sinners received tribute awards.

== Winners and nominees ==
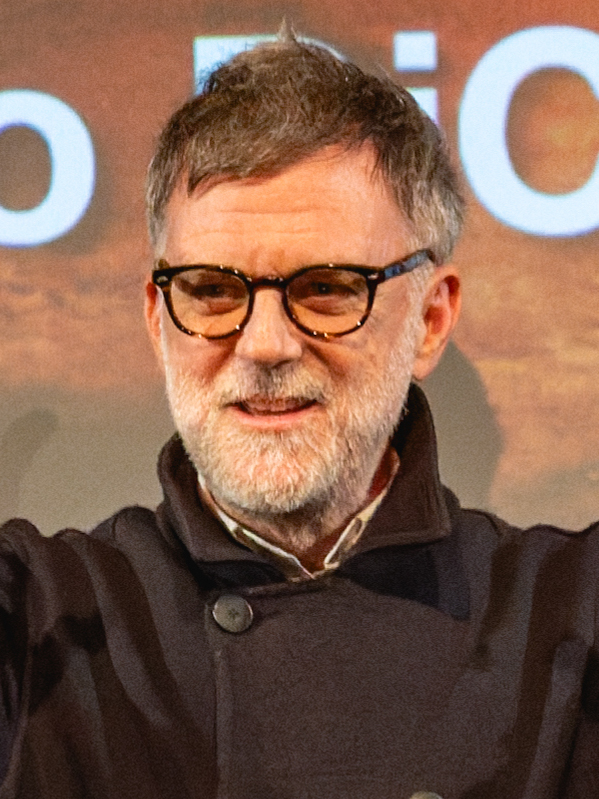
Paul Thomas Anderson, Best Feature co-winner

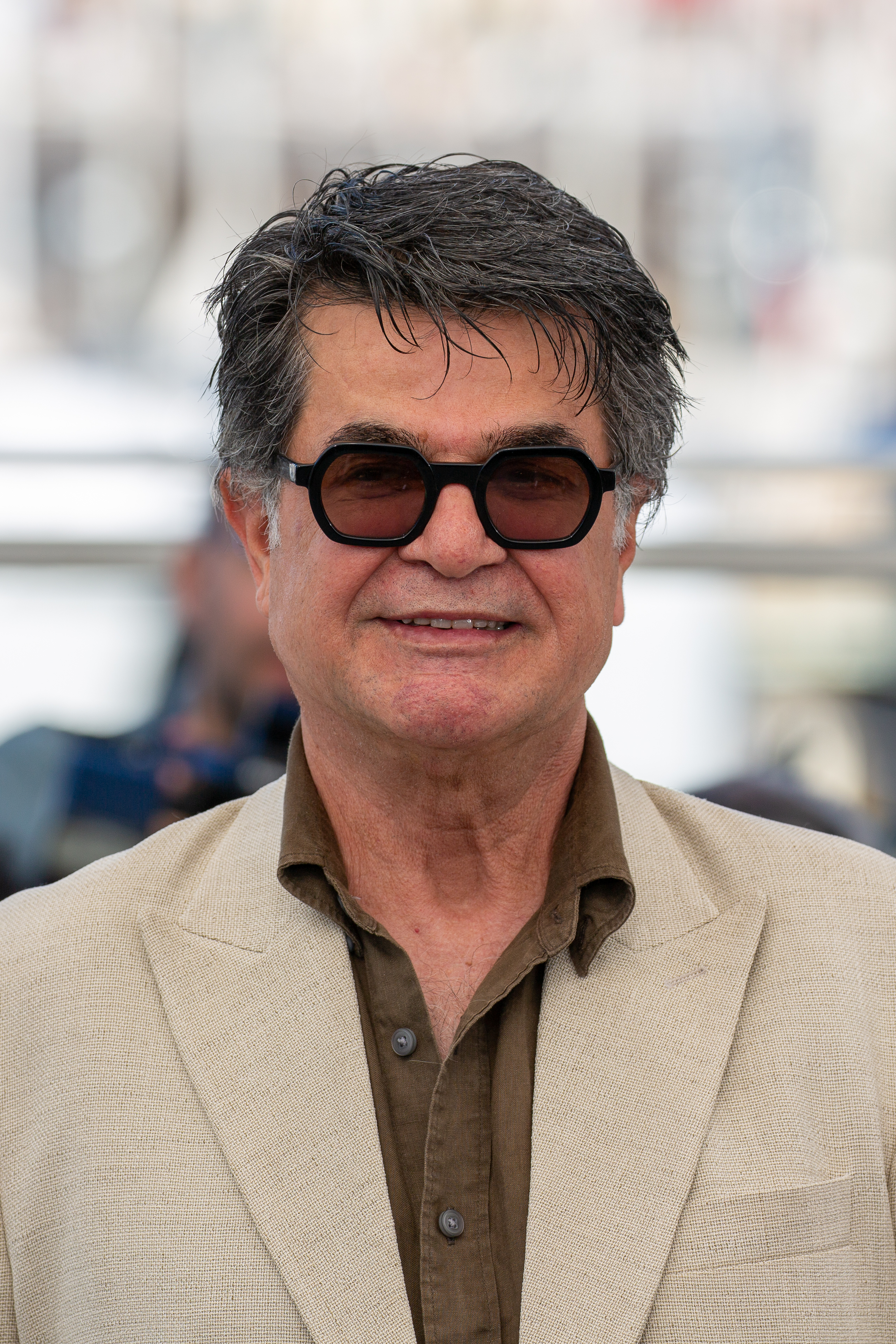
Jafar Panahi, Best Director and Best Original Screenplay winner, and Best International Feature co-winner

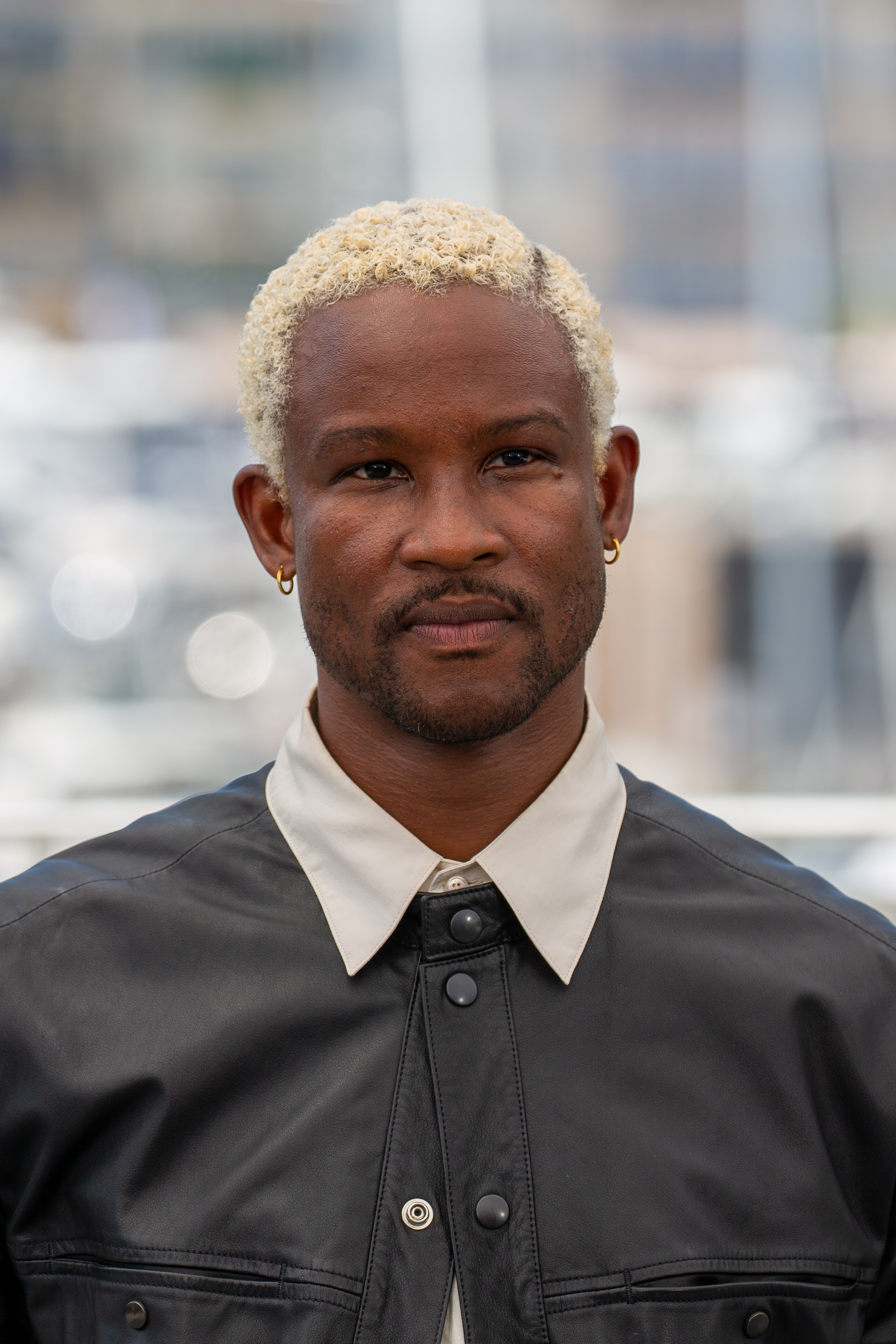
Akinola Davies Jr., Breakthrough Director winner

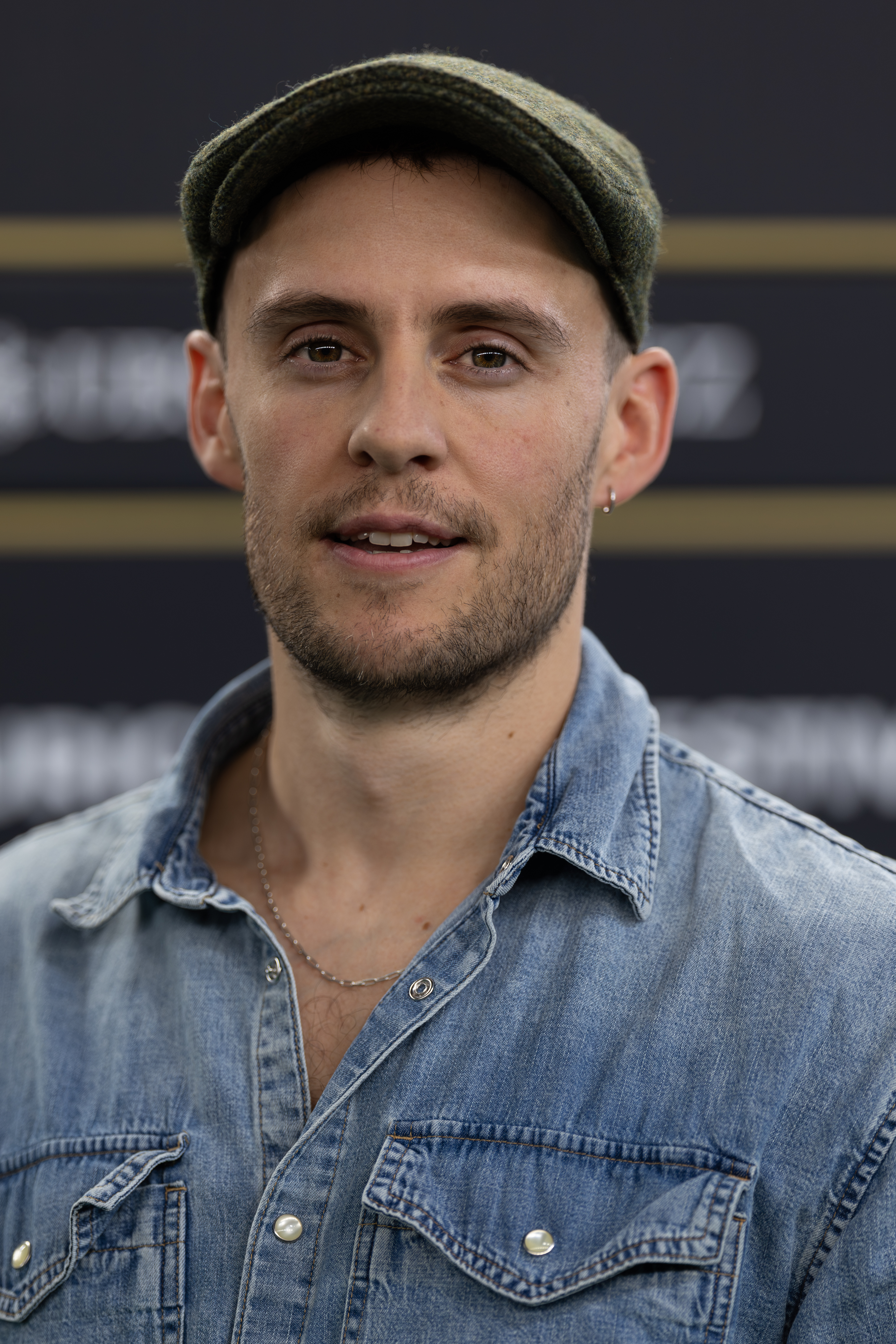
Harry Lighton, Best Adapted Screenplay winner

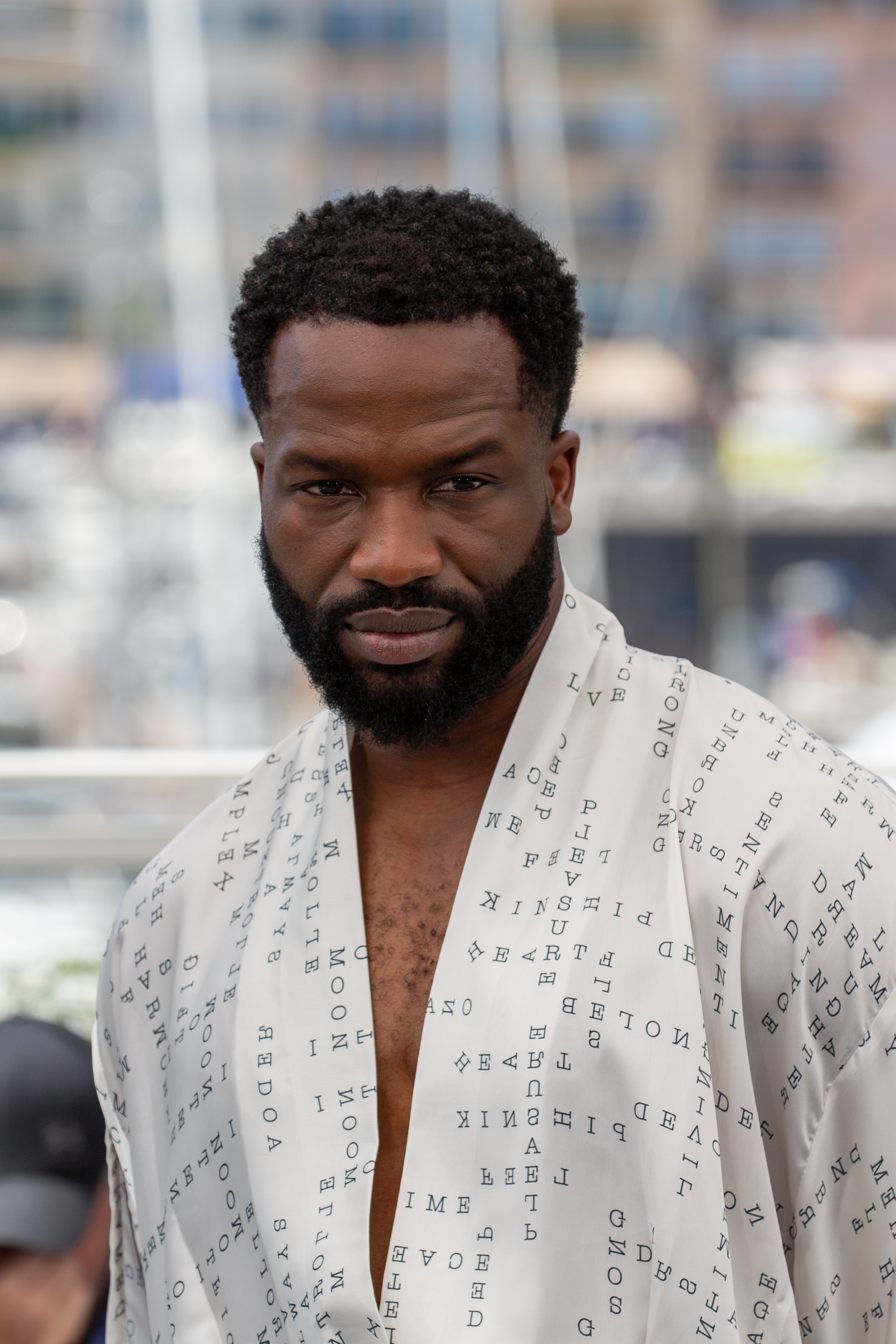
Sopé Dìrísù, Outstanding Lead Performance winner

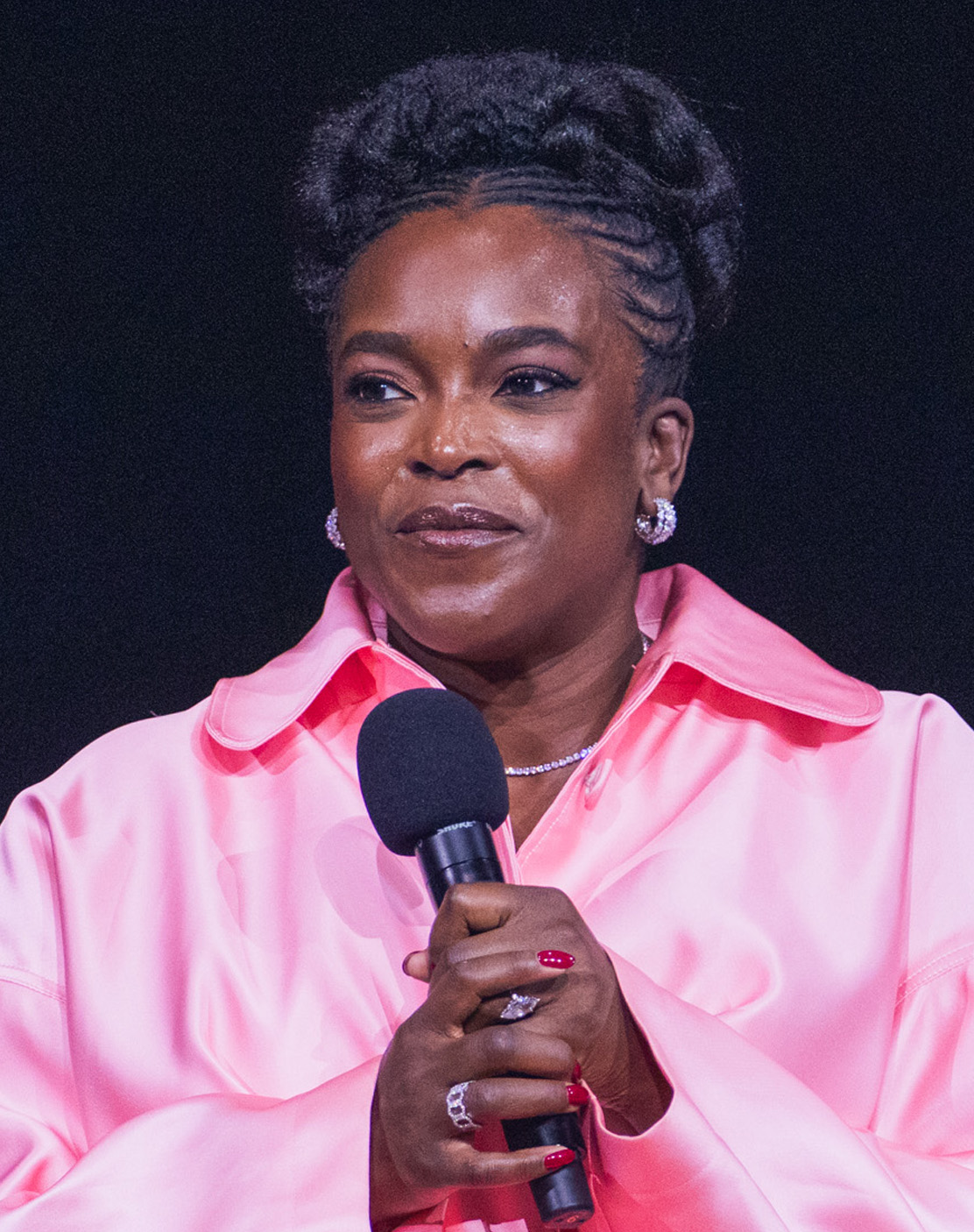
Wunmi Mosaku, Outstanding Supporting Performance winner

Best Feature: One Battle After Another – Paul Thomas Anderson, Sara Murphy, and Adam Somner, producers; Bugonia – Ari Aster, Ed Guiney, Lars Knudsen, Jerry Kyoungboum Ko, Yorgos Lanthimos, Miky Lee, Andrew Lowe, and Emma Stone, producers; East of Wall – Kate Beecroft, Shannon Moss, Melanie Ramsayer, and Lila Yacoub, producers; Familiar Touch – Alexandra Byer, Sarah Friedland, and Matthew Thurm, producers; Hamnet – Nicolas Gonda, Pippa Harris, Liza Marshall, Sam Mendes, and Steven Spielberg, producers; If I Had Legs I'd Kick You – Ronald Bronstein, Eli Bush, Richie Doyle, Conor Hannon, Sara Murphy, Josh Safdie, and Ryan Zacarias, producers; Lurker – Galen Core, Archie Madekwe, Marc Marrie, Charlie McDowell, Francesco Melzi d'Eril, Duncan Montgomery, Alex Orlovsky, Olmo Schnabel, and Jack Selby, producers; Sorry, Baby – Mark Ceryak, Barry Jenkins, and Adele Romanski, producers; The Testament of Ann Lee – Brady Corbet, Mona Fastvold, Joshua Horsfield, Gregory Jankilevitsch, Mark Lampert, Lillian LaSalle, Andrew Morrison, Viktória Petrányi, and Klaudia Śmieja-Rostworowska, producers; Train Dreams – Michael Heimler, Will Janowitz, Marissa McMahon, Ashley Schlaifer, and Teddy Schwarzman, producers
Best Director: Jafar Panahi – It Was Just an Accident; Mary Bronstein – If I Had Legs I'd Kick You; Kelly Reichardt – The Mastermind; Paul Thomas Anderson – One Battle After Another; Oliver Laxe – Sirāt	Breakthrough Director: Akinola Davies Jr. – My Father's Shadow; Constance Tsang – Blue Sun Palace; Carson Lund – Eephus; Sarah Friedland – Familiar Touch; Harris Dickinson – Urchin
Best Original Screenplay: It Was Just an Accident – Jafar Panahi; If I Had Legs I'd Kick You – Mary Bronstein; The Secret Agent – Kleber Mendonça Filho; Sorry, Baby – Eva Victor; Sound of Falling – Mascha Schilinski and Louise Peter	Best Adapted Screenplay: Pillion – Harry Lighton; No Other Choice – Park Chan-wook, Lee Kyoung-mi, Ja-hye Lee, and Don McKellar; One Battle After Another – Paul Thomas Anderson; Preparation for the Next Life – Martyna Majok; Train Dreams – Clint Bentley and Greg Kwedar
Best Documentary Feature: My Undesirable Friends: Part I — Last Air in Moscow – Julia Loktev, director; Julia Loktev, producer; 2000 Meters to Andriivka – Mstyslav Chernov, director; Raney Aronson-Rath, Mstyslav Chernov, and Michelle Mizner, producers; BLKNWS: Terms & Conditions – Kahlil Joseph, director; Onye Anyanwu, Kahlil Joseph, David Linde, Anikah McLaren, James Shani, and Steven Soderbergh, producers; The Perfect Neighbor – Geeta Gandbhir, director; Sam Bisbee, Geeta Gandbhir, Nikon Kwantu, and Alisa Payne, producers; Put Your Soul on Your Hand and Walk – Sepideh Farsi, director; Javad Djavahery and Sepideh Farsi, producers	Best International Feature: It Was Just an Accident – Philippe Martin and Jafar Panahi, producers; No Other Choice – Park Chan-wook, Alexandre Gavras, Michèle Ray Gavras, and Back Jisun, producers; Nouvelle Vague – Laurent Pétin and Michèle Pétin, producers; Resurrection – Charles Gillibert, Yang Lele, and Shan Zuolong, producers; Sound of Falling – Lucas Schmidt and Maren Schmitt, producers
Outstanding Lead Performance: Sopé Dìrísù – My Father's Shadow as Folarin; Jessie Buckley – Hamnet as Agnes Shakespeare; Rose Byrne – If I Had Legs I'd Kick You as Linda; Lee Byung-hun – No Other Choice as Yoo Man-su; Ethan Hawke – Blue Moon as Lorenz Hart; Jennifer Lawrence – Die My Love as Grace; Wagner Moura – The Secret Agent as Marcelo Alves / Armando Solimões / Fernando Solimões; Josh O'Connor – The Mastermind as James Blaine "J.B." Mooney; Amanda Seyfried – The Testament of Ann Lee as Ann Lee; Tessa Thompson – Hedda as Hedda Gabler	Outstanding Supporting Performance: Wunmi Mosaku – Sinners as Annie; Benicio del Toro – One Battle After Another as Sergio St. Carlos; Jacob Elordi – Frankenstein as The Creature; Inga Ibsdotter Lilleaas – Sentimental Value as Agnes Borg Pettersen; Indya Moore – Father Mother Sister Brother as Skye; Adam Sandler – Jay Kelly as Ron Sukenick; Andrew Scott – Blue Moon as Richard Rodgers; Alexander Skarsgård – Pillion as Ray; Stellan Skarsgård – Sentimental Value as Gustav Borg; Teyana Taylor – One Battle After Another as Perfidia Beverly Hills
Breakthrough Performer: Abou Sangaré – Souleymane's Story as Souleymane; A$AP Rocky – Highest 2 Lowest as Yung Felon; Sebiye Behtiyar – Preparation for the Next Life as Aishe; Chase Infiniti – One Battle After Another as Willa Ferguson; Tonatiuh – Kiss of the Spider Woman as Luis Molina / Kendall Nesbitt

=== Films with multiple wins and nominations ===
Film that received multiple wins
Wins	Film
3	It Was Just an Accident
2	My Father's Shadow

Films that received multiple nominations
Nominations	Film
6	One Battle After Another
4	If I Had Legs I'd Kick You
3	It Was Just an Accident
3	No Other Choice
2	Blue Moon
2	Familiar Touch
2	Hamnet
2	The Mastermind
2	My Father's Shadow
2	Pillion
2	Preparation for the Next Life
2	The Secret Agent
2	Sentimental Value
2	Sorry, Baby
2	Sound of Falling
2	The Testament of Ann Lee
2	Train Dreams

== Special awards ==
=== Cultural Icon Tribute ===
- Jeremy Allen White and Scott Cooper – Springsteen: Deliver Me from Nowhere

=== Director Tribute ===
- Noah Baumbach – Jay Kelly

=== Ensemble Tribute ===
- Sinners – Michael B. Jordan, Hailee Steinfeld, Miles Caton, Jack O'Connell, Wunmi Mosaku, Jayme Lawson, Omar Benson Miller, Buddy Guy, Li Jun Li, and Delroy Lindo

=== Musical Tribute ===
- Hugh Jackman and Kate Hudson – Song Sung Blue

=== Spotlight Tribute ===
- Tessa Thompson – Hedda

=== Vanguard Tribute ===
- Guillermo del Toro, Oscar Isaac, and Jacob Elordi – Frankenstein

=== Visionary Tribute ===
- Luca Guadagnino and Julia Roberts – After the Hunt
