= Superfakes =

American television series

- Genre: Mystery thriller
- Created by: Alice Ju
- Starring: Lucy Liu; Ken Leung; Bohan Phoenix; Michelle Jones Lee; Keith Leung
- Country of origin: United States
- Original language: English

Production
- Executive producers: Alice Ju; Josh Safdie; Benny Safdie; Howard Klein; Olivia Gerke; Ronald Bronstein; Eli Bush; Lucy Liu; Karena Evans; Jim McKay
- Production companies: A24; Universal Global Television; 3 Arts Entertainment; Central Pictures; Out For The Count

Original release
- Network: Peacock

Superfakes is an upcoming American crime drama series created and executive produced by Alice Ju for Peacock. It is set to star Lucy Liu as a luxury counterfeit dealer who enters the dangerous black-market underworld to fund her life.

== Premise ==
A small-time luxury counterfeit dealer enters the dangerous blackmarket underworld to fund her life.

== Cast and characters ==
=== Main ===
- Lucy Liu
- Ken Leung as Don
- Bohan Phoenix
- Michelle Jones Lee
- Keith Leung

=== Recurring ===
- Dustin Nguyen as Henry
- David Lavine as Don's Lawyer

== Production ==
=== Development ===
In January 2025, Peacock ordered the series, with Alice Ju set to write and executive produce alongside Benny Safdie and Josh Safdie. A24 and Universal Content Productions will produce alongside 3 Arts Entertainment. Jim McKay, Karena Evans and Andrij Parekh will serve as directors on the series. McKay and Evans will additionally serve as executive producers. In June 2026 during the production of Superfakes, Universal Content Productions had merged into Universal International Studios with the latter being renamed Universal Global Television and had assumed production of the series following the merger of Superfakes co-producer Universal Content Productions into Universal Global Television.

=== Casting ===
In September 2025, Lucy Liu joined the cast of the series. In October 2025, Ken Leung joined the cast. In January 2026, Bohan Phoenix, Michelle Jones Lee and Keith Leung joined the cast. In February 2026, Dustin Nguyen joined the cast in a recurring role.

=== Filming ===
Principal photography commenced in January 2026.

== Release ==
The series is set to premiere in 2027.
