= 2025 New York Film Critics Circle Awards =

91st New York Film Critics Circle Awards

91st NYFCC Awards
- Date: December 2, 2025

Highlights
- Best Picture: One Battle After Another

The 91st New York Film Critics Circle Awards, honoring the best in film for 2025, were announced on December 2, 2025.

The annual awards gala dinner took place at Tao Downtown in New York on January 6, 2026.

== Winners ==
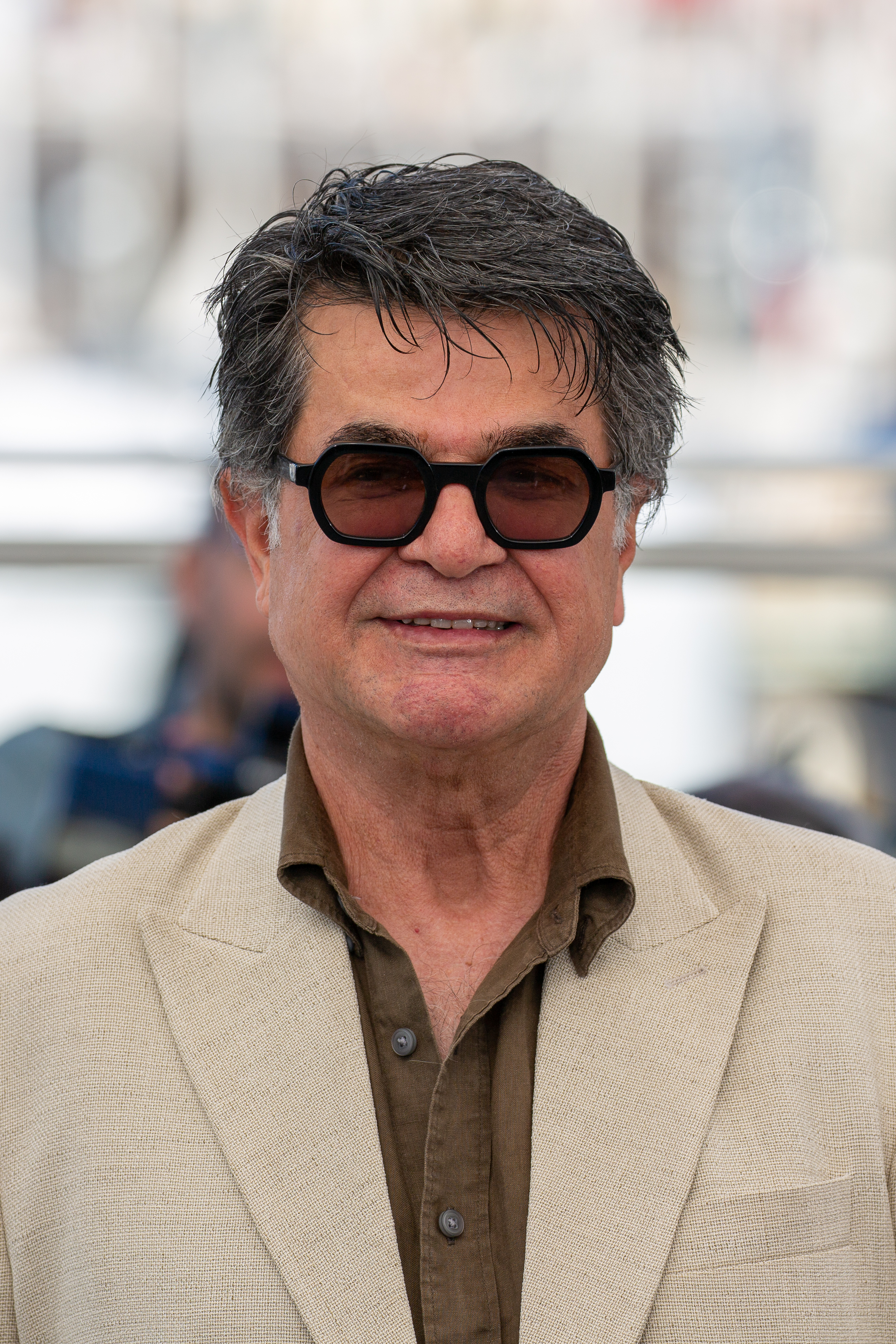
Jafar Panahi, Best Director winner

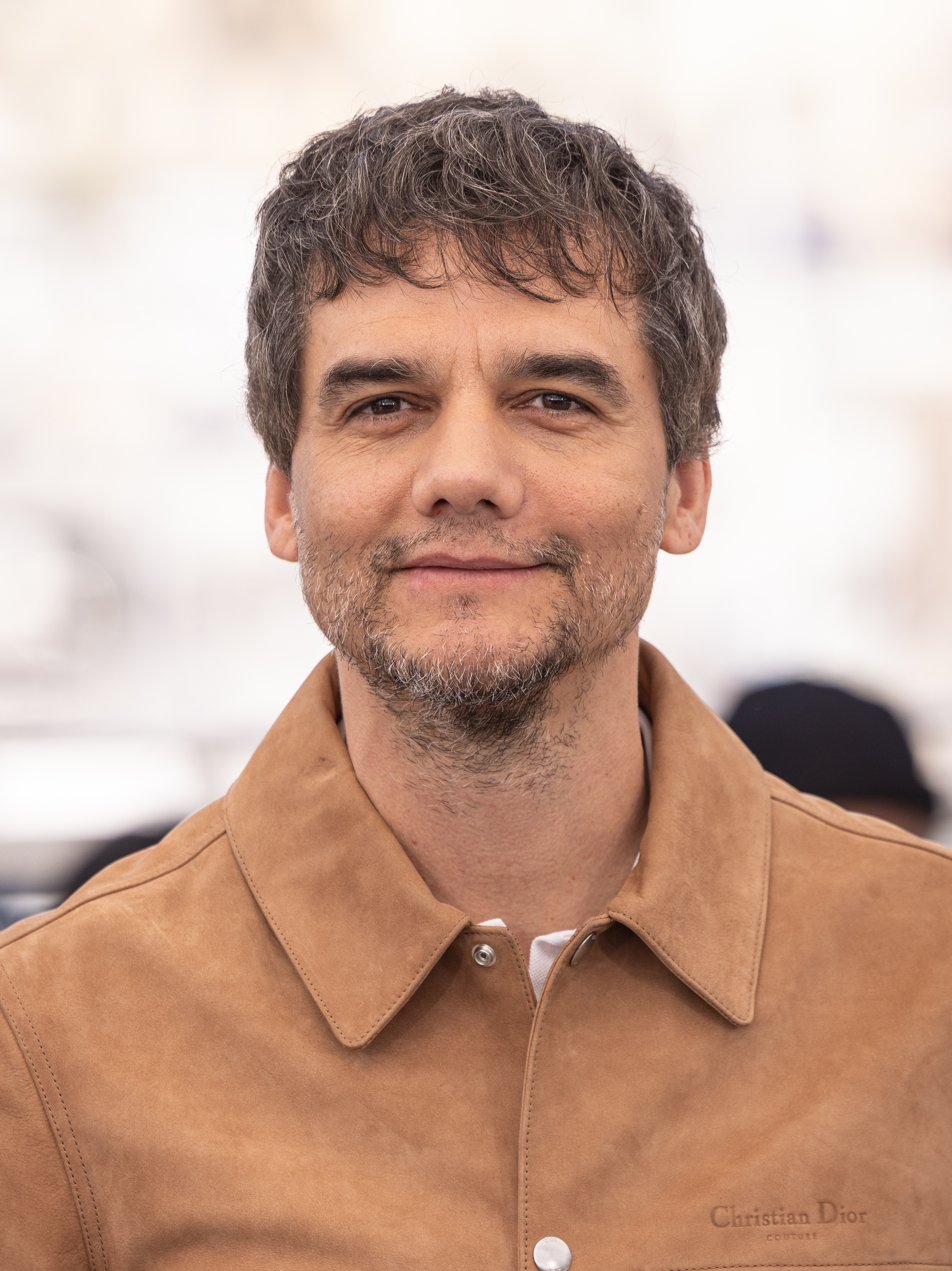
Wagner Moura, Best Actor winner

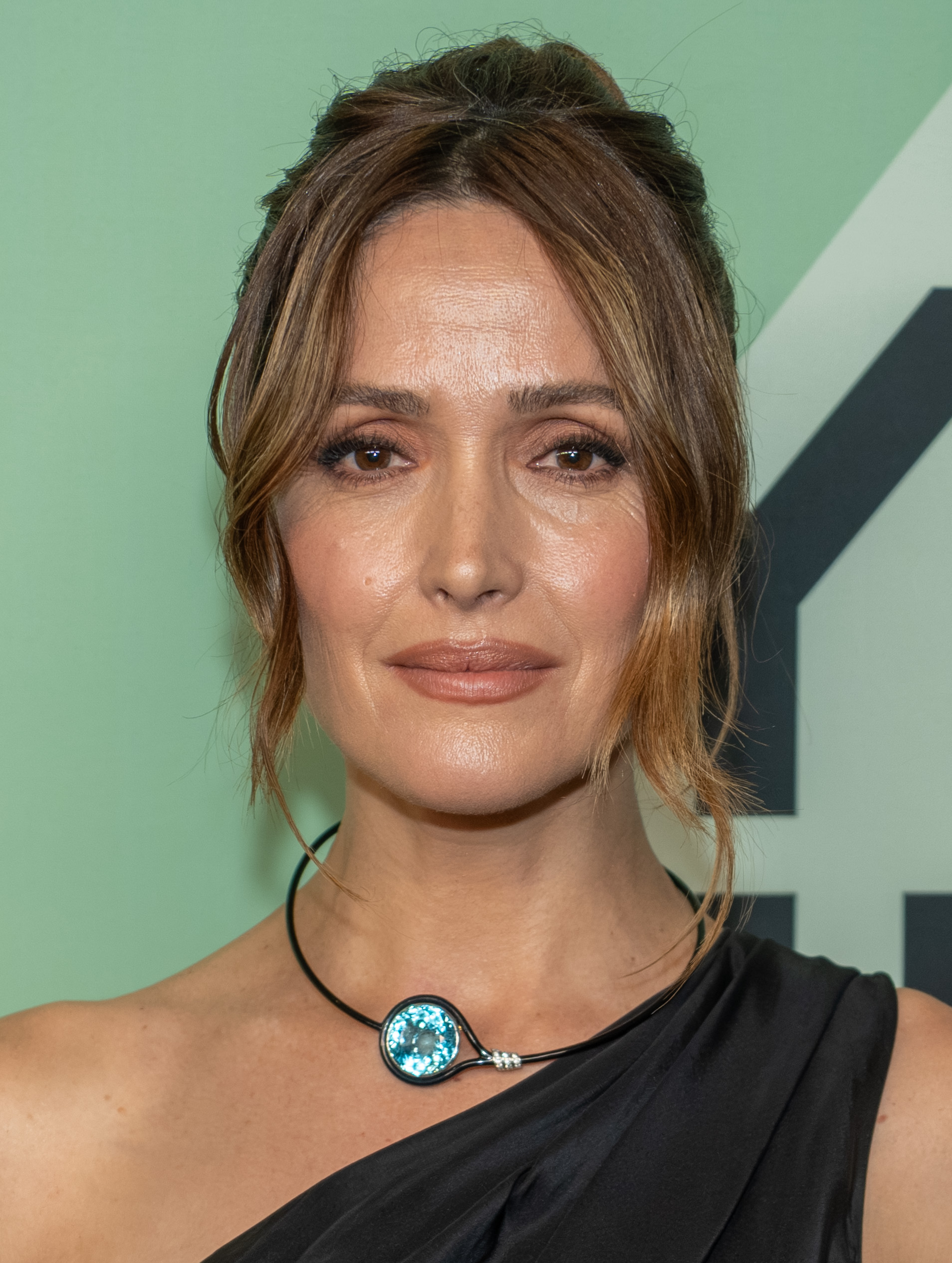
Rose Byrne, Best Actress winner

- Best Film:
  - One Battle After Another
- Best Director:
  - Jafar Panahi – It Was Just an Accident
- Best Actor:
  - Wagner Moura – The Secret Agent
- Best Actress:
  - Rose Byrne – If I Had Legs I'd Kick You
- Best Supporting Actor:
  - Benicio del Toro – One Battle After Another
- Best Supporting Actress:
  - Amy Madigan – Weapons
- Best Screenplay:
  - Josh Safdie and Ronald Bronstein – Marty Supreme
- Best Animated Film:
  - KPop Demon Hunters
- Best Cinematography:
  - Autumn Durald Arkapaw – Sinners
- Best Non-Fiction Film:
  - My Undesirable Friends: Part I — Last Air in Moscow
- Best International Film:
  - The Secret Agent • Brazil
- Best First Film:
  - Eephus
- Special Awards:
  - Screen Slate
  - Museum of the Modern Image
- Special Mentions:
  - Cash prizes were awarded to two students focusing on film criticism/journalism attending college in the region:
    - Undergraduate – London Xhudo (New York University)
    - Graduate – Tan Zhiyuan (The New School)
