= Neighbors (TV series) =

American documentary series

- Genre: Documentary
- Directed by: Harrison Fishman; Dylan Redford
- Music by: Max Whipple
- Country of origin: United States
- Original language: English
- No. of seasons: 1
- No. of episodes: 6

Production
- Executive producers: Harrison Fishman; Dylan Redford; Jonathan Hausfater; Chris Bowyer; Josh Safdie; Ronald Bronstein; Eli Bush; John Paul Lopez-Ali; Samuel Fishman; Brendan McHugh; Andy Ruse; Max Allman
- Producers: Rachel Walden; Natalie Teter
- Running time: 30-37 minutes
- Production companies: Gummy Films; Genma Pictures; Central Pictures; A24; HBO Entertainment

Original release
- Network: HBO
- Release: February 13, 2026 – present

Neighbors is a 2026 American documentary television series directed and executive produced by Harrison Fishman and Dylan Redford. It follows chaotic and complicated disputes between neighbors. Ronald Bronstein, Josh Safdie, and Eli Bush serve as executive producers for Central Pictures, which produced alongside HBO Entertainment, A24, Gummy Films, and Genma Pictures.

The series premiered on February 13, 2026, on HBO to positive reviews from critics. In March 2026, HBO renewed the series for a second season.

== Premise ==
The show explores complicated and chaotic disputes between neighbors, with each episode featuring a different set of neighbors. Each episode includes two sets of disputes from across the United States of America: beachgoers and private homeowners in Santa Rosa Beach, Florida, Seth and Josh in Shawmut, Montana (Ep. 1); Darrell and Trever in Kokomo, Indiana, Jean and Marice in Philadelphia, Pennsylvania (Ep. 2); Melissa and Victoria in West Palm Beach, Florida and Johnny and Andy in Palm Bay, Florida (Ep. 3); Joanne and Steven in Nashville, Tennessee, Jeff and Alexa in San Antonio, Texas (Ep. 4); Otis and Nelson in Bloomfield, New Jersey, Linda and Ruby in Simi Valley, California (Ep. 5); and Danny who considers moving from San Diego to Pasco County (Ep. 6).

== Production ==
Harrison Fishman and Dylan Redford decided to make the series after spending the COVID-19 pandemic watching viral videos of neighbors at war. Production is ongoing for 2027 season, with the two alongside casting director Harleigh Shaw searched stories from newspapers, Small claims court and Facebook groups. Josh Safdie, Ronald Bronstein, and Eli Bush serve as executive producers under their Central Pictures banner, alongside A24.

On March 19, 2026, HBO renewed the series for a second season.

== Episodes ==
No.	Title	Directed by	Original release date
1	"Shoreline Defender"	Harrison Fishman; Dylan Redford	February 13, 2026
A heated debate amongst beachgoers and private homeowners emerges on the Santa Rosa Beach shoreline in Florida. In rural Montana, Seth takes issue with a gate placed by new neighbor Josh, who insists he's within his legal rights to do so.
2	"The Farm"	Harrison Fishman; Dylan Redford	February 20, 2026
In Indiana, Darrell's retirement bliss is thrown into disarray when Trever starts raising livestock on his grandmother's property. In Philadelphia, Jean's penchant for taking in dozens of stray cats encroaches on Marice's family life.
3	"Patch of Grass"	Harrison Fishman; Dylan Redford	February 27, 2026
In Florida, former friends Melissa and Victoria dispute the rightful ownership of a small patch of grass between their West Palm Beach homes. In Palm Bay, Johnny and Andy's own grass-related feud leads to accusations of stalking.
4	"White Privilege Card"	Harrison Fishman; Dylan Redford	March 6, 2026
Nashville neighbors Joanne and Steven's friendship ruptures beyond repair. In San Antonio, Jeff obsesses over Alexa's 8-foot concrete wall.
5	"Halloween Competition"	Harrison Fishman; Dylan Redford	March 13, 2026
An annual Halloween decoration competition in New Jersey leads to growing resentment between Otis and Nelson. In Simi Valley, California, Linda and Ruby's long-standing fence debacle takes a legal turn.
6	"Yellow Thong Bikini"	Harrison Fishman; Dylan Redford	March 20, 2026
When his choice of exercise apparel draws the scrutiny of his neighbors, life-long San Diego resident Danny embarks on a journey to find a more like-minded community in Pasco County, Florida.

== Release ==
The series premiered on February 13, 2026, on HBO.

== Reception ==
On the review aggregator website Rotten Tomatoes, 64% of 14 critics' reviews are positive. The website's consensus reads: "At times fascinating in a can't-look-away fashion, Neighbors displays all the pitfalls within the spectrum of human decency, and lack thereof, in a mostly unpleasant series." On Metacritic, the series has a weighted average score of 61 out of 100, based on 8 critics, indicating "generally favorable reviews".
