= Independent Spirit Award for Best New Non-Scripted or Documentary Series =

Annual US film award

- Awarded for: Best New Non-Scripted or Documentary Series
- Country: United States
- Presented by: Film Independent
- First award: 2020
- Currently held by: Pee-wee as Himself (2024)
- Website: filmindependent.org

The Independent Spirit Award for New Non-Scripted or Documentary Series is one of the annual Independent Spirit Awards, presented to recognize the best in independent filmmaking.

== History ==
It was first awarded in 2020 with the documentary miniseries Immigration Nation being the first recipient of the award.

== Criteria ==
Only first-season documentary or non-fiction series are eligible to compete, with a focus on unique, original, and diverse storytelling.

== Recipients ==
=== 2020s ===
| Year | Winner | Network | Nominee(s) |
|---|---|---|---|
| 2020 | Immigration Nation | Netflix | Christina Clusiau, Shaul Schwarz, Dan Cogan, Jenny Raskin, Brandon Hill, Christian Thompson (executive producers); Andrey Alistratov, Jay Arthur Sterrenberg, Lauren Haber (co-executive producers) |
| 2020 | Atlanta's Missing and Murdered: The Lost Children | HBO | Jeff Dupre, Joshua Bennett, Sam Pollard, Maro Chermayeff, John Legend, Mike Jackson, Ty Stiklorius (executive producers) |
| 2020 | City So Real | National Geographic | Zak Piper, Steve James (producers); Jeff Skoll, Diane Weyermann, Alex Kotlowitz, Gordon Quinn, Betsy Steinberg, Jolene Pinder (executive producers) |
| 2020 | Love Fraud | Showtime | Rachel Grady, Heidi Ewing, Amy Goodman Kass, Vinnie Malhotra, Jihan Robinson, Michael Bloom, Maria Zuckerman (executive producers) |
| 2020 | We're Here | HBO | Stephen Warren, Johnnie Ingram (creators/executive producers); Eli Holzman, Aaron Saidman, Peter LoGreco (executive producers); Erin Haglund, Sabrina Mar (co-executive producers) |
| 2021 | Black and Missing | HBO | Soledad O’Brien, Geeta Gandbhir (series by/executive producers); Jo Honig, Patrick Conway, Nancy Abraham, Lisa Heller, Sara Rodriguez (executive producers) |
| 2021 | The Choe Show | FX | David Choe (creator/executive producer); Matt Revelli, Christopher C. Chen, Hiro Murai, Nate Matteson (executive producers) |
| 2021 | The Lady and the Dale | HBO | Mark Duplass, Jay Duplass, Mel Eslyn, Allen Bain, Andre Gaines, Nick Cammilleri, Alana Carithers, Zackary Drucker, Nancy Abraham, Lisa Heller (executive producers) |
| 2021 | Nuclear Family | HBO | Ry Russo-Young (series by); Liz Garbus, Julie Gaither, Jon Bardin, Leah Holzer, Peter Saraf, Alex Turtletaub, Jenny Raskin, Geralyn White Dreyfous, Lauren Haber, Maria Zuckerman, Christine Connor, Ryan Heller, Barbara Dobkin, Eric Dobkin, Andrea Van Beuren, Joe Landauer (executive producers) |
| 2021 | Philly D.A. | PBS | Ted Passon, Yoni Brook, Nicole Salazar (creators); Josh Penn, Michael Gottwald (producers); Dawn Porter, Sally Jo Fifer, Lois Vossen, Ryan Chanatry, Gena Konstantinakos, Jeff Seelbach, Patty Quillin (executive producers); Nion McEvoy, Leslie Berriman (co-executive producers) |
| 2022 | The Rehearsal | HBO | Nathan Fielder (creator/executive producer); Dave Paige, Dan McManus, Christie Smith (executive producers); Carrie Kemper, Eric Notarnicola (co-executive producers) |
| 2022 | Children of the Underground | FX | Dan Cogan, Liz Garbus, Jon Bardin, Ted Gesing, Gabriela Cowperthwaite, Kate Barry (executive producers); Julie Gaither (co-executive producer) |
| 2022 | Mind Over Murder | HBO | Marc Smerling, Nanfu Wang, Max Heckman, Chad Mumm, Mark W. Olsen, Nancy Abraham, Lisa Heller, Sara Rodriguez (executive producers) |
| 2022 | Pepsi, Where's My Jet? | Netflix | Nick Boak, Andrew Renzi, Andrew D. Corkin, Theo James, Andrew Fried, Jordan Wynn, Dane Lillegard, Sarina Roma (executive producers); Jeremiah Murphy (co-executive producer) |
| 2022 | We Need to Talk About Cosby | Showtime | W. Kamau Bell, Andrew Fried, Katie A. King, Vinnie Malhotra, Dane Lillegard, Sarina Roma, Jordan Wynn (executive producers); Geraldine L. Porras (co-executive producer) |
| 2023 | Dear Mama | FX | Lasse Järvi, Quincy "QD3" Jones III, Staci Robinson, Nelson George, Charles D. King, Peter Nelson, Adel "Future" Nur, Jamal Joseph, Ted Skillman, Allen Hughes, Steve Berman, Marc Cimino, Jody Gerson, John Janick, Nicholas Ferrall, and Nigel Sinclair (executive producers) |
| 2023 | Deadlocked: How America Shaped the Supreme Court | Showtime | Vinnie Malhotra, Aaron Saidman, Eli Holzman, and Dawn Porter (executive producers) |
| 2023 | Murder in Big Horn | Showtime | Matthew Galkin and Vinnie Malhotra (executive producers); Lisa Kalikow and Joshua Levine (co-executive producers) |
| 2023 | Stolen Youth: Inside the Cult at Sarah Lawrence | Hulu | Mindy Goldberg, Dan Cogan, Liz Garbus, Jon Bardin, Zach Heinzerling, Krista Parris, Daniel Barban Levin, and Felicia Rosario (executive producers); Julie Gaither (co-executive producer) |
| 2023 | Wrestlers | Netflix | Greg Whiteley and Ryan O'Dowd (executive producers); Alejandro Melendez and Adam Leibowitz (co-executive producers) |
| 2024 | Hollywood Black | MGM+ | Shayla Harris, Dave Sirulnick, Stacey Reiss, Jon Kamen, Justin Simien, Kyle Laursen, Forest Whitaker, Nina Yang Bongiovi, Jeffrey Schwarz, Amy Goodman Kass, Michael Wright, and Jill Burkhart (executive producers); David C. Brown and Laurens Grant (co-executive producers) |
| 2024 | Erased: WW2's Heroes of Color | National Geographic | Idris Elba, Johanna Woolford Gibbon, Jamilla Dumbuya, Jos Cushing, Khaled Gad, Matt Robins, Chris Muckle, Sean David Johnson, and Simon Raikes (executive producers); Annabel Hobley (co-executive producer) |
| 2024 | Photographer | National Geographic | Elizabeth Chai Vasarhelyi, Jimmy Chin, Pagan Harleman, and Betsy Forhan (executive producers); Anna Barnes and Brent Kunkle (co-executive producers) |
| 2024 | Ren Faire | HBO | Ronald Bronstein, Benny Safdie, Josh Safdie, Eli Bush, Dani Bernfeld, Lance Oppenheim, David Gauvey Herbert, Nancy Abraham, Lisa Heller, and Sara Rodriguez (executive producers); Abigail Rowe, Christian Vasquez, and Max Allman (co-executive producers) |
| 2024 | Social Studies | FX | Lauren Greenfield (creator/executive producer); Wallis Annenberg, Regina K. Scully, Andrea van Beuren, Frank Evers, and Caryn Capotosto (executive producers) |
| 2025 | Pee-wee as Himself | HBO | Matt Wolf, Emma Tillinger Koskoff, Ronald Bronstein, Eli Bush, Benny Safdie, Josh Safdie, Paul Reubens (posthumous), Candace Tomarken, Kyle Martin, Nancy Abraham, Lisa Heller, and Sara Rodriguez (executive producers) |
| 2025 | Citizen Nation | PBS | Bret Sigler (creator); Christopher Buck and Kyra Darnton (executive producers) |
| 2025 | Hurricane Katrina: Race Against Time | National Geographic | Jonathan Chinn, Simon Chinn, Ryan Coogler, Myles Estey, Ted Skillman, Zinzi Coogler, Sev Ohanian, Peter Nicks, Kalia King, Carolyn Payne, and Sean David Johnson (executive producers); Kelli Buchanan (co-executive producer) |
| 2025 | Seen & Heard: The History of Black Television | HBO | Issa Rae, Montrel McKay, John Maggio, Rachel Dretzin, John Ealer, Jonathan Berry, Dave Becky, Nancy Abraham, Lisa Heller, and Sara Rodriguez (executive producers); Esther Dere and Zachary Herrmann (co-executive producers) |
| 2025 | Vow of Silence: The Assassination of Annie Mae | Hulu | Ezra Edelman, Caroline Waterlow, Amy Kaufman, Jake Gyllenhaal, and Riva Marker (executive producers); Mark Becker (co-executive producer) |

== Networks with multiple wins ==
- HBO – 3
