= If I Had Legs I'd Kick You =

2025 film by Mary Bronstein

- Theatrical release poster
- Directed by: Mary Bronstein
- Written by: Mary Bronstein
- Produced by: Sara Murphy; Ryan Zacarias; Ronald Bronstein; Josh Safdie; Eli Bush; Conor Hannon; Richie Doyle
- Starring: Rose Byrne; Conan O'Brien; Danielle Macdonald; Christian Slater; ASAP Rocky
- Cinematography: Christopher Messina
- Edited by: Lucian Johnston
- Production companies: A24; Central Pictures; Fat City; Bronxburgh
- Distributed by: A24
- Release dates: January 24, 2025 (Sundance); October 10, 2025 (United States)
- Running time: 113 minutes
- Country: United States
- Language: English
- Box office: $1.7 million

If I Had Legs I'd Kick You is a 2025 American psychological drama film written and directed by Mary Bronstein. It stars Rose Byrne as a mother who, after facing numerous obstacles, spirals into a mental breakdown. The supporting cast includes Conan O'Brien, Danielle Macdonald, Christian Slater, and ASAP Rocky.

The film had its world premiere at the 2025 Sundance Film Festival, and was released domestically by A24 on October 10. If I Had Legs I'd Kick You was received favorably by critics. Byrne's performance received universal acclaim, earning her the Silver Bear for Best Leading Performance, an Independent Spirit Award for Best Lead Performance and a Golden Globe Award, alongside nominations for the Critics' Choice Award, Actor Award, BAFTA Award and Academy Award for Best Actress.

== Plot ==
Linda is a psychotherapist caring for her clingy, anxious daughter, who has a pediatric feeding disorder that necessitates nightly use of a feeding tube. Linda also drives her daughter to and from a day hospital program daily. Linda's ship captain husband Charles is away from home for long periods.

The family's Montauk apartment is flooded after the ceiling collapses. Linda and her daughter move to a shabby motel run by an insolent clerk, Diana, and superintendent Jamie. Linda struggles to sleep due to the noise from her daughter's feeding pump. She spends sleep-deprived nights outside the motel room drinking wine, smoking cannabis, listening to music, and eating junk food. Repairs to the apartment have been left in limbo by the contractor's sudden departure.

Linda finds her clients demanding, including Caroline, a new mother suffering from paranoia and postpartum anxiety. Linda seeks therapy from a colleague, who is increasingly exasperated by her lack of professional boundaries. When Charles calls to check in on Linda, he is critical and unsupportive, saying he wishes he could "sit around all day" as a therapist. Her daughter's hospital program doctor reprimands Linda for frequently missing family therapy sessions and emphasises that her daughter must meet her weight goal or her level of care will be reassessed. Linda feels she's being set up to fail and that her daughter will not eat more as long as she is using the feeding tube.

Caroline abandons her son in Linda's office during a session and when Caroline's husband refuses to pick up the child, Linda calls the police. Jamie offers to help Linda buy drugs on the dark web and offers her daughter emotional support. When he comes to the apartment to look at the collapsed ceiling, he falls through the damaged floor and breaks his leg. Linda flees the scene after calling an ambulance.

Linda causes a scene at the hospital when she is told her daughter cannot reach the necessary weight for removing her feeding tube and feels the doctor blames her. She tells her therapist she aborted her first pregnancy years before having her daughter, and cries about her failings as a mother. He tells her that he no longer can be her therapist. Caroline comes to the motel looking for Linda's help with a mental health crisis. When Linda suggests a hospital emergency room, Caroline slaps her and runs off.

Linda removes her daughter's feeding tube and has a hallucination of the surgical hole closing. Returning to her apartment, she discovers Charles has unexpectedly returned and had the hole in the ceiling repaired. They return to the motel room to find Jamie responded to the panicking daughter. Charles sees the missing feeding tube and Linda flees to the beach, running into the surf and repeatedly being thrown back ashore.

Linda wakes on the sand beside her daughter, the child's face visible for the first time in the film. She promises she will "be better" and her daughter smiles.

== Cast ==
Byrne (pictured in 2025) portrays Linda

- Rose Byrne as Linda
- Conan O'Brien as Linda's therapist
- Danielle Macdonald as Caroline, one of Linda's patients
- Delaney Quinn as Linda's daughter
- Christian Slater as Charles, Linda's husband
- ASAP Rocky as Jamie, a motel superintendent
- Ivy Wolk as Diana, a motel clerk
- Mary Bronstein as Dr. Spring
- Lark White as Vanessa
- Daniel Zolghadri as Stephen, one of Linda's patients
- Ella Beatty as Kate, one of Linda's patients
- Mark Stolzenberg as a clinic parking attendant
- Ronald Bronstein as Caroline's husband
- Helen Hong as Eva
- Amy Judd Lieberman as Melanie
- Josh Pais as Brad
- Manu Narayan as Landlord
- Eva Kornet as herself

== Production ==
If I Had Legs I'd Kick You began filming in August and September 2023 in Montauk, New York, after SAG-AFTRA granted an interim agreement for the film during the actors' strike. The film was shot over 27 days, with Bronstein giving up her director's fee to obtain two additional shooting days. Due to the film's limited budget, Bronstein and the director of photography recorded its surrealist elements during post-production.

The film was Bronstein's first movie since her 2008 debut, Yeast. She said she wrote the film as a means of processing the trauma she experienced while caring for her 7-year-old daughter, who was suffering from severe health problems at the time.

== Release ==
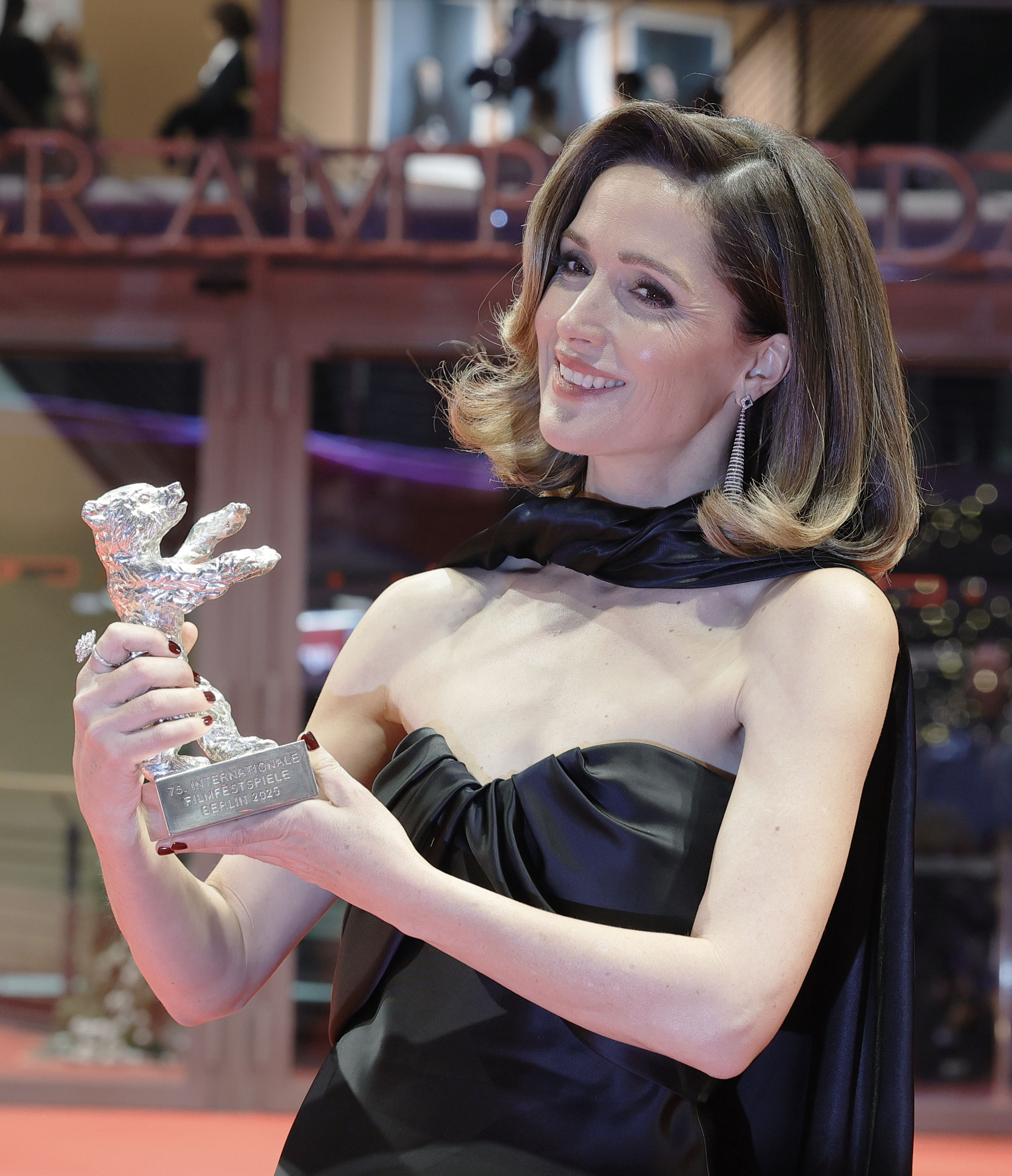
Byrne with the Silver Bear for Best Leading Performance

If I Had Legs I'd Kick You premiered at the Sundance Film Festival on January 24, 2025. It had its international premiere in February 2025 at the 75th Berlin International Film Festival in competition for the Golden Bear. Byrne won the Silver Bear for Best Leading Performance. It screened at the 52nd Telluride Film Festival, the 2025 Toronto International Film Festival, the 2025 New York Film Festival, and the 2025 BFI London Film Festival. It was released by A24 on October 10, 2025.

If I Had Legs I'd Kick You also screened in the Best of 2025 section of the 20th Rome Film Festival in October 2025.

The first physical releases on Blu-ray and DVD were in Canada on December 23, 2025.

== Reception ==
=== Critical reception ===
On the review aggregator website Rotten Tomatoes, 92% of 225 critics' reviews are positive, with an average rating of 7.7/10. The website's consensus reads: "Liable to leave audiences in a cold sweat, this fever dream immersion into parental stress connects with thunderous force thanks to Rose Byrne's gutsy star turn and director Mary Bronstein's uncompromising vision." Metacritic, which uses a weighted average, assigned the film a score of 78 out of 100, based on 40 critics, indicating "generally favorable" reviews.

Critics praised Byrne's performance, with Jeanette Catsoulis of The New York Times and Glenn Whipp of the Los Angeles Times calling it "magnificent". David Fear of Rolling Stone wrote, "[Byrne] is particularly on-point here, the sort of exquisitely raw, white-knuckle performance that feels so voyeuristic and personal that, if you had any decency, you'd look away. She ensures that you can't".

Many writers compared the film favorably to Uncut Gems. Stephanie Zacharek of Time called it "Uncut Gems for moms". Zacharek and Whipp noted that Bronstein's husband, Ronald Bronstein, is a frequent collaborator with the Safdie brothers and that Josh Safdie is one of the film's producers. Ronald Bronstein also appears in a voice-only cameo.

=== Accolades ===
Award	Date of ceremony	Category	Recipient	Result	Ref.
Academy Awards	March 15, 2026	Best Actress	Rose Byrne	Nominated	
Actor Awards	March 1, 2026	Outstanding Performance by a Female Actor in a Leading Role	Rose Byrne	Nominated	
Astra Film Awards	January 9, 2026	Best Actress – Comedy or Musical	Rose Byrne	Nominated	
Atlanta Film Critics Circle	December 3, 2025	Best Lead Actress	Rose Byrne	Runner-up	
Austin Film Critics Association	December 18, 2025	Best Actress	Rose Byrne	Won	
BAFTA Awards	February 22, 2026	Best Actress in a Leading Role	Rose Byrne	Nominated	
Berlin International Film Festival	February 23, 2025	Golden Bear	If I Had Legs I'd Kick You	Nominated	
Berlin International Film Festival	February 23, 2025	Silver Bear for Best Leading Performance	Rose Byrne	Won	
Chicago Film Critics Association	December 11, 2025	Best Actress	Rose Byrne	Won	
Chicago Film Critics Association	December 11, 2025	Milos Stehlik Breakthrough Filmmaker Award	Mary Bronstein	Nominated	
Critics' Choice Awards	January 4, 2026	Best Actress	Rose Byrne	Nominated	
Film Independent Spirit Awards	February 15, 2026	Best Director	Mary Bronstein	Nominated	
Film Independent Spirit Awards	February 15, 2026	Best Lead Performance	Rose Byrne	Won	
Georgia Film Critics Association Awards	December 27, 2025	Best Original Screenplay	Mary Bronstein	Nominated	
Georgia Film Critics Association Awards	December 27, 2025	Best Actress	Rose Byrne	Nominated	
Golden Globe Awards	January 11, 2026	Best Actress in a Motion Picture – Musical or Comedy	Rose Byrne	Won	
Gotham Independent Film Awards	December 1, 2025	Best Feature	Ronald Bronstein, Eli Bush, Richie Doyle, Conor Hannon, Sara Murphy, Josh Safdie, and Ryan Zacarias	Nominated	
Gotham Independent Film Awards	December 1, 2025	Best Director	Mary Bronstein	Nominated	
Gotham Independent Film Awards	December 1, 2025	Best Original Screenplay	Mary Bronstein	Nominated	
Gotham Independent Film Awards	December 1, 2025	Outstanding Lead Performance	Rose Byrne	Nominated	
Indiana Film Journalists Association	December 15, 2025	Best Lead Performance	Rose Byrne	Nominated	
Indiana Film Journalists Association	December 15, 2025	Best Original Screenplay	Mary Bronstein	Nominated	
Indiana Film Journalists Association	December 15, 2025	Original Vision	If I Had Legs I'd Kick You	Nominated	
Los Angeles Film Critics Association Awards	December 7, 2025	Best Lead Performance	Rose Byrne	Won	
Michigan Movie Critics Guild	December 8, 2025	Best Actress	Rose Byrne	Nominated	
Middleburg Film Festival	October 19, 2025	Agnès Varda Trailblazing Film Artist Award	Rose Byrne	Won	
Mill Valley Film Festival	October 10, 2025	Mind the Gap Award	Rose Byrne	Won	
National Board of Review	January 13, 2026	Best Actress	Rose Byrne	Won	
National Board of Review	January 13, 2026	Top Ten Independent Films	If I Had Legs I'd Kick You	Won	
National Society of Film Critics	January 3, 2026	Best Actress	Rose Byrne	Runner-up	
New York Film Critics Circle	January 6, 2026	Best Actress	Rose Byrne	Won	
New York Film Critics Online	December 15, 2025	Best Picture	If I Had Legs I'd Kick You	Nominated	
New York Film Critics Online	December 15, 2025	Best Screenplay	Mary Bronstein	Nominated	
New York Film Critics Online	December 15, 2025	Best Actress	Rose Byrne	Runner-up	
Phoenix Critics Circle	December 11, 2025	Best Actress	Rose Byrne	Nominated	
San Diego Film Critics Society	December 15, 2025	Best Actress	Rose Byrne	Won	
San Francisco Film Critics	December 14, 2025	Best Actress	Rose Byrne	Won	
Savannah Film Festival	October 27, 2025	Luminary Award	Rose Byrne	Won	
Seattle Film Critics Society	December 15, 2025	Best Actress in a Leading Role	Rose Byrne	Nominated	
Sitges Film Festival	October 18, 2025	Best Feature Film	If I Had Legs I'd Kick You	Nominated	
Sitges Film Festival	October 18, 2025	Best Female Performance	Rose Byrne	Won	
St. Louis Film Critics Association Awards	December 14, 2025	Best Actress	Rose Byrne	Nominated	
Stockholm International Film Festival	November 14, 2025	Golden Horse	If I Had Legs I'd Kick You	Nominated	
Toronto Film Critics Association	March 2, 2026	Outstanding Lead Performance	Rose Byrne	Won	
Washington D.C. Area Film Critics Association	December 7, 2025	Best Actress	Rose Byrne	Nominated	
Writers Guild of America Awards	March 8, 2026	Best Original Screenplay	Mary Bronstein	Nominated	
