= Screen Slate =

Online film guide

- Screenshot Screen Slate homepage as of November 2022
- Website type: Online film guide
- Available in: English
- Headquarters: New York, New York
- Founder: Jon Dieringer
- Website: www.screenslate.com
- Commercial: No
- Launched: February 14, 2011; 15 years ago
- Current status: Active

Screen Slate is an online guide for seeing movies established in New York City. The website curates daily listings of art house, repertory cinema, and gallery shows, and publishes original essays, cultural criticism, features, and interviews. According to SSENSE, "Screen Slate captures the chaotic, diffuse energy of contemporary movie culture (while also guarding against its dumber instincts) better than any other publication."

== Background ==
Screen Slate was founded by Jon Dieringer, a New York City filmgoer who compiled the listings of repertory cinemas, galleries, and microcinemas each day and published them online and a daily email. Gradually the site grew to include daily editorial contributions.

In 2023, Screen Slate launched an offshoot in the San Francisco Bay area.

As of 2026, Screen Slate has published the work of more than 400 contributors and is estimated to refer millions of dollars in ticket revenue to independent cinemas each year. Despite this, it remains a low-budget opeartion without any full-time staff.

== Cultural Impact ==
Screen Slate is noted for bringing younger audiences to cinemas and elevating the visibility of New York's DIY microcinemas and non-traditional screening venues. Many of Screen Slate's contributors, including Dieringer, have been volunteers of Spectacle Theater.

In 2026, Ari Aster, Rowan Blanchard, Richard Hell, Jim Jarmusch, Talia Ryder, Josh Safdie, Isabel Sandoval, Sarah Sherman, Amy Taubin, and John Wilson participated in a 15th anniversary celebration.

== Accolades ==
- National Society of Film Critics, Film Heritage Award, 2023
- 91st New York Film Critics Circle Awards, Special Award, 2026

== Notable contributors ==
- Jacqueline Castel
- Ricky D'Ambrose
- Sasha Frere-Jones
- A.S. Hamrah
- Richard Hell
- Mitch Horowitz
- Dean Hurley
- Bill Kartalopoulos
- Stephanie LaCava
- Nicolas Rapold
- Luke Rathborne
- Jonathan Rosenbaum
- Aaron Schimberg
- Amy Taubin
