= The Land of Nod (film) =

Upcoming horror film by Kyle Edward Ball

- Directed by: Kyle Edward Ball
- Written by: Kyle Edward Ball
- Produced by: Josh Safdie; Ronald Bronstein; Eli Bush; Elijah Wood; Lawrence Inglee; Daniel Noah; Bruno Vernaschi-Berman; Tatiana Bears
- Starring: Clare Coulter; Phillip Forest Lewitski; Aviva Mongillo
- Production companies: Central Pictures; SpectreVision; Good Bath
- Distributed by: A24
- Country: United States
- Language: English

The Land of Nod is an upcoming American horror film written and directed by Kyle Edward Ball and distributed by A24.

== Premise ==
The film follows a group of isolated neighbors in their small and secluded town in the Northern Canadian territories during a snowstorm.

== Cast ==
- Clare Coulter as Marie
- Phillip Forest Lewitski as David
- Aviva Mongillo
- Huxley Fisher as John
- Edward Simon as Shiloh
- Pamela Matthews as Joyce
- Neil Enock as The Officer
- Alleya Bourne as Closet Figure

== Production ==
In October 2024, it was revealed that Kyle Edward Ball was set to write and direct a new film titled The Land of Nod, with Josh Safdie, Eli Bush and Ronald Bronstein producing through their Central Pictures banner and Elijah Wood through his SpectreVision banner, and A24 acquiring distribution rights.

Principal photography began on March 24, 2025 and wrapped on April 22, 2025, with filming taking place in Edmonton and Yellowknife in Canada.
