= Gotham Independent Film Award for Best Director =

Annual US film award

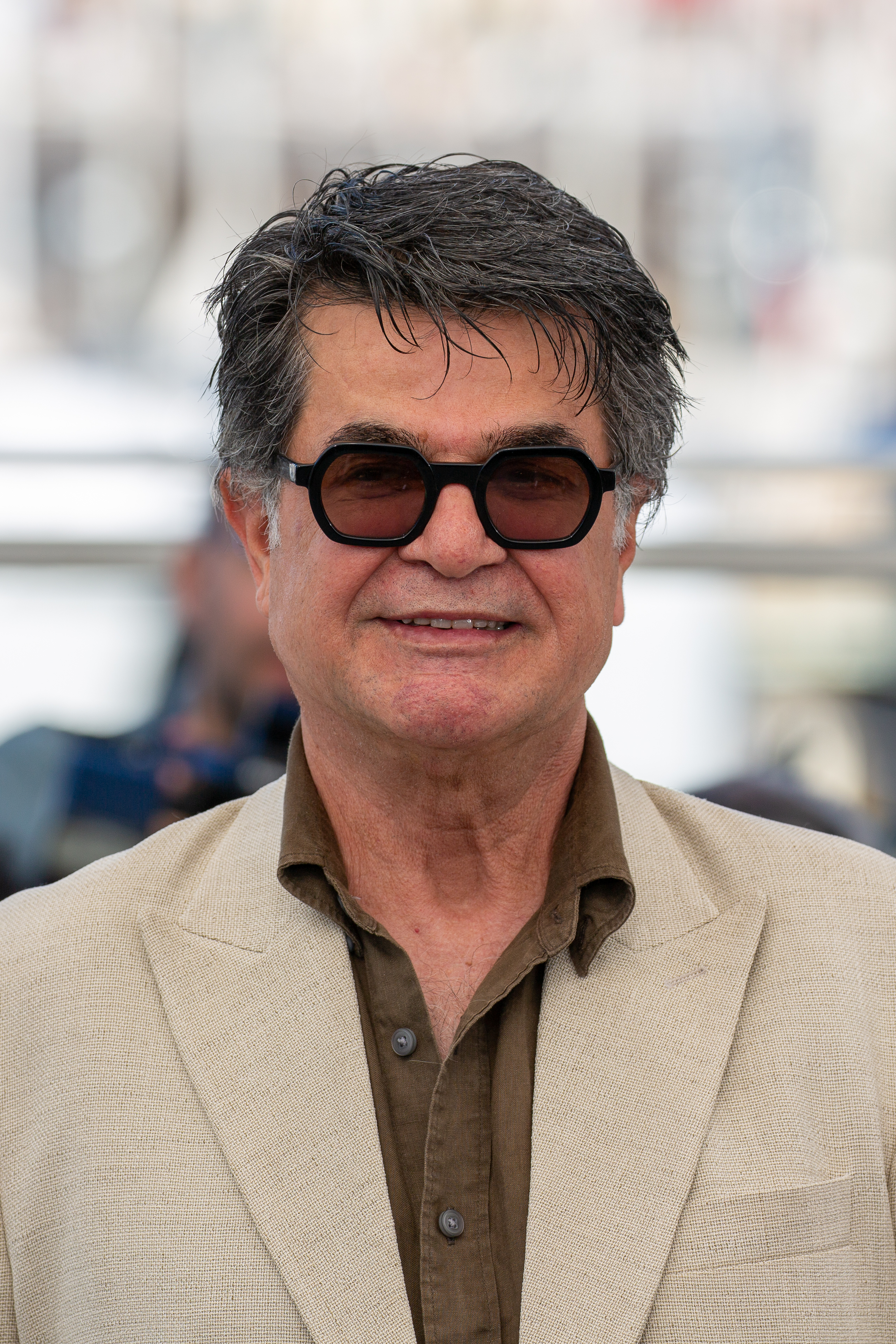
- The 2025 recipient: Jafar Panahi
- Country: United States
- Presented by: The Gotham Film & Media Institute
- Currently held by: Jafar Panahi for It Was Just an Accident (2025)
- Website: awards.thegotham.org

The Gotham Independent Film Award for Best Director is one of the annual Gotham Awards. It was established in 2024. RaMell Ross is the first winner of the award for Nickel Boys (2024).

== Winners and nominees ==
=== 2020s ===
Year	Director(s)	Film	Ref.
2024	RaMell Ross	Nickel Boys	
2024	Payal Kapadia	All We Imagine as Light	
2024	Sean Baker	Anora	
2024	Guan Hu	Black Dog	
2024	Jane Schoenbrun	I Saw the TV Glow	
2025	Jafar Panahi	It Was Just an Accident	
2025	Mary Bronstein	If I Had Legs I'd Kick You	
2025	Kelly Reichardt	The Mastermind	
2025	Paul Thomas Anderson	One Battle After Another	
2025	Oliver Laxe	Sirāt	
2026	Ryusuke Hamaguchi	All of a Sudden	
2026	Sandra Wollner	Everytime	
2026	Andrey Zvyagintsev	Minotaur	
2026	Jane Schoenbrun	Teenage Sex and Death at Camp Miasma	
2026	Mike Leigh	Tender Loving Care	

== See also ==
- Academy Award for Best Director
- BAFTA Award for Best Direction
- Critics' Choice Movie Award for Best Director
- Golden Globe Award for Best Director
- Independent Spirit Award for Best Director
- National Board of Review Award for Best Director
