= Frownland (film) =

- Promotional poster
- Directed by: Ronald Bronstein
- Story by: Ronald Bronstein
- Produced by: Marc Raybin
- Starring: Dore Mann
- Cinematography: Sean Price Williams
- Edited by: Ronald Bronstein
- Release dates: March 9, 2007 (SXSW); March 7, 2008 (United States)
- Running time: 106 minutes
- Country: United States
- Language: English

Frownland is a 2007 American independent film written, directed, and edited by Ronald Bronstein in his directorial debut. It stars Dore Mann as Keith, a self-described "troll", who sweats and stutters his way through his job as a door-to-door salesman, dubiously selling coupons to assist people affected by multiple sclerosis. The film is populated by a cast of characters as dysfunctional and full of neuroses as Keith. The title comes from the song "Frownland" off the album Trout Mask Replica, by Captain Beefheart (who suffered from multiple sclerosis).

It premiered at South by Southwest in 2007, where it won the Special Jury Prize, and was self-distributed in New York City on March 7, 2008.

== Plot summary ==
The story centers on Keith (Dore Mann), a socially challenged yet self-aware young man in his late 20s, trying to get through life. He is a chain-smoker, a shabby dresser, sleeps in the kitchen of his cramped two-room New York apartment, and makes his living as a door-to-door salesman selling dubious coupon booklets. His girlfriend, Laura (Mary Wall), arrives sobbing to his tiny room, sleeps with her face to the wall, and sticks him with a push-pin. His flatmate, Charles (Paul Grimstad), agrees to pay the electric bill but doesn't, and verbally abuses Keith. His "friend," Sandy (David Sandholm), doesn't want Keith to visit, once tricking him into leaving and another time forcing him to.

The film details the ineptitude of Keith's daily life over the span of a few days. "It is full throttle all the way with insecurity, needfulness, loneliness, mistrust, desperation, self-hate, apology and despair."

== Cast ==
- Dore Mann as Keith
- Paul Grimstad as Charles
- David Sandholm as Sandy
- Carmine Marino as Carmine
- Mary Wall as Laura

== Awards ==
Frownland won the Special Jury Award at the SXSW Festival in Austin, Texas and Best Film Not Playing at a Theater Near You at the Gotham Awards in 2007.

== Release ==
Frownland opened on March 7, 2008, at the IFC Center in New York City, where it was introduced by Lodge Kerrigan, who had previously seen the film at the Maryland Film Festival.

Richard Brody of the New Yorker highly praises the film: " This amazingly accomplished first feature by Ronald Bronstein, made with a crew of four on a scant budget, throbs with energy and vision.... Mann, a distant cousin of Bronstein’s, delivers a transfixing performance; his clenched jaws, squinting eyes, and stifled speech avoid all stereotypes as he brings the character to life from within." Roger Ebert gives the film 3.5 stars out of 4, saying "It centers on an extraordinary performance that plays like an unceasing panic attack. To call it uncompromising is to wish for a better word.... It is full throttle all the way with insecurity, needfulness, loneliness, mistrust, desperation, self-hate, apology and despair."

== Home media ==
The film was released on DVD by Factory 25 on September 29, 2009. The film was released as part of the Criterion Collection in August 2022.
