= Mary Bronstein =

American filmmaker (born 1979)

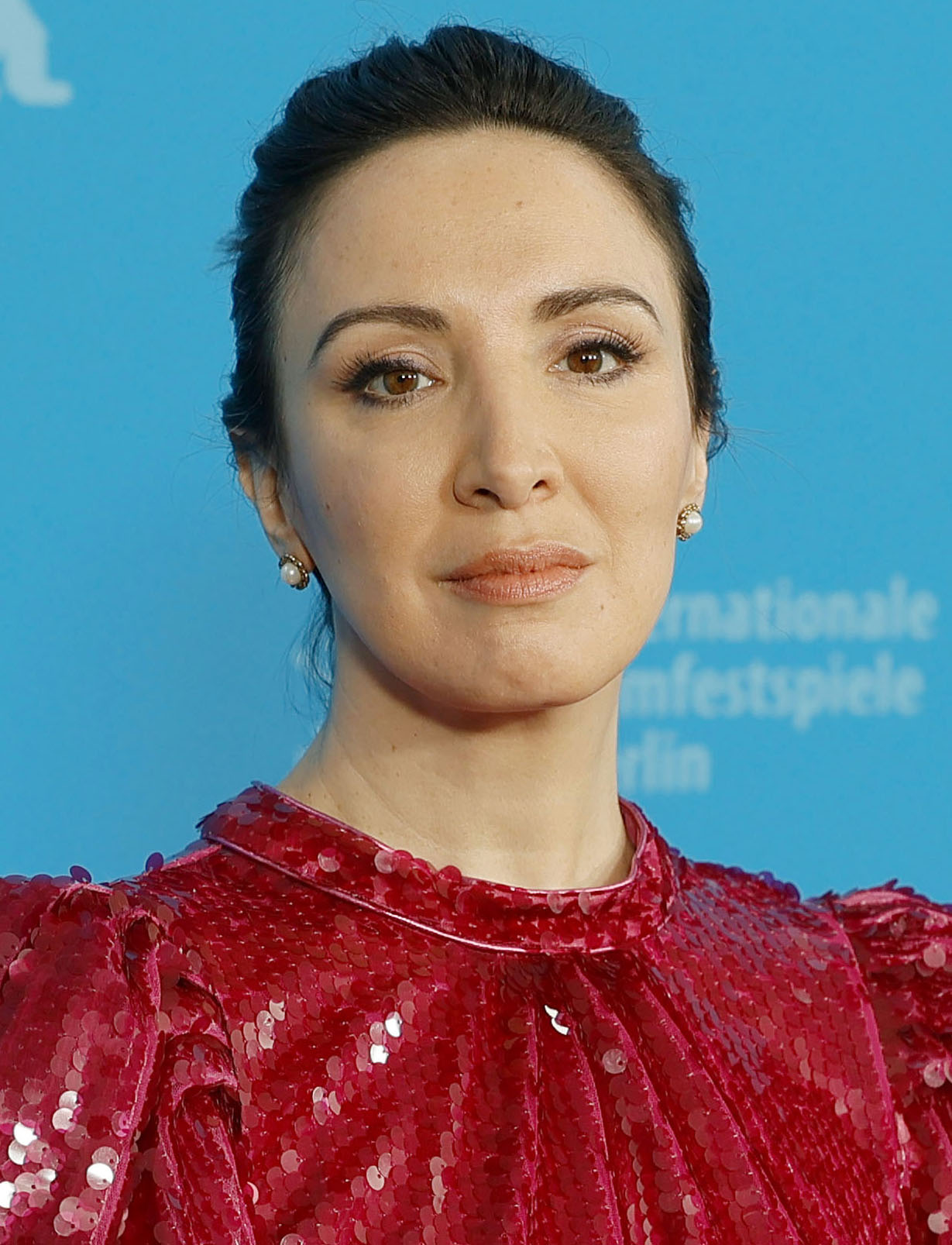
- Bronstein in 2025
- Born: Mary Wall; 1979 (age 46–47); White Plains, New York, U.S.
- Occupations: Actress, filmmaker
- Years active: 2007–2011; 2025–present
- Spouse: Ronald Bronstein
- Children: 1

Mary Bronstein (née Wall, born 1979) is an American actress and filmmaker best known for the films Yeast (2008) and If I Had Legs I'd Kick You (2025).

== Early life and education ==
Bronstein was born in 1979 in White Plains, New York, a suburb of New York City. She attended New York University Tisch School of the Arts.

== Career ==
In 2007 Bronstein appeared in Frownland, directed by her future husband Ronald Bronstein. Her own directorial debut, Yeast, premiered at the 2008 South by Southwest Film Festival.

Bronstein's second feature as director, If I Had Legs I'd Kick You, was announced in 2023 and premiered at the 2025 Sundance Film Festival. Produced by Elara Pictures and Fat City, the film is distributed by A24. The film was screened in competition at the 75th Berlin International Film Festival and received five nominations at the Gotham Independent Film Awards, including for Best Feature and Best Director.

== Personal life ==
Bronstein is married to Ronald Bronstein. They have a daughter.

== Filmography ==
Director

- Yeast (2008)
- If I Had Legs I'd Kick You (2025)
- Nasty (2027)

Actress

Year	Title	Role	Notes	Ref.
2007	Frownland	Laura	Credited as "Mary Wall"	
2008	Yeast	Rachel	—N/a	
2011	The Jonestown Defense	Tina	—N/a	
2025	If I Had Legs I'd Kick You	Dr. Spring	—N/a	

== Awards and nominations ==
Award	Year	Category	Work	Result	Ref.
Berlin International Film Festival	2025	Golden Bear	If I Had Legs I'd Kick You	Nominated	
Chicago Film Critics Association	2025	Milos Stehlik Breakthrough Filmmaker Award	If I Had Legs I'd Kick You	Nominated	
Film Independent Spirit Awards	2026	Best Director	If I Had Legs I'd Kick You	Nominated	
Georgia Film Critics Association Awards	2025	Best Original Screenplay	If I Had Legs I'd Kick You	Nominated	
Gotham Independent Film Awards	2025	Best Director	If I Had Legs I'd Kick You	Nominated	
Gotham Independent Film Awards	2025	Best Original Screenplay	If I Had Legs I'd Kick You	Nominated	
New York Film Critics Online	2025	Best Screenplay	If I Had Legs I'd Kick You	Nominated	
Writers Guild of America Awards	2026	Best Original Screenplay	If I Had Legs I'd Kick You	Nominated	
