= Adam Sandler: Love You =

2024 American Netflix comedy special

- Genre: Stand-up comedy
- Directed by: Josh Safdie
- Starring: Adam Sandler; Willie Tyler
- Country of origin: United States
- Original language: English

Production
- Executive producers: Barry Bernardi; Robert Digby; John Irwin
- Producers: Josh Safdie; Ronald Bronstein; Eli Bush; Dan Bulla; Carter Hambley; Brian Robinson; Joseph Vecsey; Judit Maull; Eli Thomas; Perry Sachs; Adam Sandler
- Production location: United States
- Cinematography: Bradford Young
- Editors: Ronald Bronstein; Brian Robinson; Luca Balser
- Running time: 74 minutes
- Production companies: Happy Madison Productions; Irwin Entertainment

Original release
- Network: Netflix
- Release: August 27, 2024

Adam Sandler: Love You is a 2024 Netflix comedy special starring Adam Sandler and directed by Josh Safdie.

Ventriloquist Willie Tyler and his puppet Lester appeared in the special.

== Reviews ==
Slate magazine said "It is not brainy material, but these stories are delivered amicably, in a stream-of-consciousness blabber, without a shred of grievance or any discernible political posture bleeding in from the margins. Sandler is unapologetic about the things he finds funny. That was true in 1995, and it's still true in 2024."

Vulture wrote "It's almost too sweet to bear, too naked in its appeal to love and life and the healing power of a good dick joke. But Love You is not just a long windup toward a thesis about laughter being the best medicine. It is also a film directed by Josh Safdie, and it has a classic Safdie-esque drive of suspense and barely contained chaos."
