= Yeast (film) =

2008 film directed by Mary Bronstein

- Directed by: Mary Bronstein
- Story by: Mary Bronstein
- Produced by: Mark Raybin
- Starring: Mary Bronstein; Greta Gerwig; Amy Judd
- Cinematography: Sean Price Williams; Michael Tully
- Edited by: Ronald Bronstein
- Production companies: Frownland, Inc.
- Release date: 10 March 2008 (SXSW)
- Running time: 78 minutes
- Country: United States

Yeast is a 2008 American comedy film directed by Mary Bronstein starring Bronstein, Greta Gerwig, and Amy Judd. It has been characterized as a mumblecore film.

== Plot ==
Rachel is a young teacher living in Brooklyn with her roommate Alice. The pair plan to go camping with their friend Gen, but Alice drops out from the trip at the last minute. Over the course of the trip, Gen acts out in immature ways, while Rachel frequently belittles her. However, they strengthen their bond when fending off unpleasant behavior from a pair of men they meet in the woods. Eventually, Gen is fed up with Rachel and physically attacks her, after which the friends drive home in silence.

Back in Brooklyn, Alice and her new boyfriend, Tony, make fun of Rachel. It becomes clear that Rachel's friendship with Alice is close to being over, especially when Alice abruptly announces that she is moving to New Jersey to work at Six Flags.

Rachel invites Gen out on a picnic, but Gen reacts dismissively to her. Rachel then goes to Six Flags, where she attends Alice's freak show act. After the show, Rachel tries to approach Alice, but Alice flees. Outside, Rachel runs into Tony again, and begs him to speak to Alice. Tony makes a pretense of inviting Rachel into his car, but immediately drives away, laughing.

== Cast ==
- Mary Bronstein as Rachel, a teacher
- Amy Judd as Alice, Rachel's roommate
- Greta Gerwig as Gen, Rachel's friend
- Josh Safdie as Riverguy 1
- Benny Safdie as Riverguy 2
- Sean Price Williams as Tony, Alice's boyfriend

== Production ==
Yeast was shot on a MiniDV camcorder by Sean Price Williams, who also appears in the film as Tony. Sound was recorded by Bronstein’s husband, Ronald Bronstein, who also edited the film.

== Release ==
Yeast premiered at the 2008 South by Southwest Film Festival.
