= Daddy Longlegs (2009 film) =

- Original festival poster under the title Go Get Some Rosemary
- Directed by: Josh Safdie Benny Safdie
- Written by: Josh Safdie; Benny Safdie; Ronald Bronstein
- Produced by: Casey Neistat; Tom Scott
- Starring: Ronald Bronstein; Sage Ranaldo; Frey Ranaldo
- Cinematography: Brett Jutkiewicz; Josh Safdie
- Edited by: Brett Jutkiewicz; Josh Safdie; Benny Safdie; Ronald Bronstein
- Production companies: Sophie Dulac Productions; Red Bucket Films
- Distributed by: IFC Films
- Release dates: May 16, 2009 (Cannes); May 14, 2010 (United States)
- Running time: 97 minutes
- Country: United States
- Language: English
- Box office: $33,217

Daddy Longlegs is a 2009 American comedy drama film directed by Josh and Benny Safdie, who co-wrote it with Ronald Bronstein. It stars Bronstein, Sage Ranaldo, and Frey Ranaldo. It tells the story of a divorced projectionist and his two sons.

Daddy Longlegs had its premiere under the title Go Get Some Rosemary in the Directors' Fortnight section at the 2009 Cannes Film Festival on May 16, 2009. It was released in the United States on May 14, 2010, by IFC Films. The film received generally positive reviews from critics.

== Plot ==
Lenny, a divorced father and a projectionist at a Manhattan movie theater, gets custody of his sons Sage and Frey for two weeks of the year. During these two weeks he encourages a playful attitude in the boys while largely acting irresponsibly. Lenny behaves obnoxiously and argues openly with other adults—including their school principal and a homeless panhandling veteran—in front of his sons, often involving them in the conversations as he enjoys setting up various improvised "games" with them. Lenny is aided in caring for the boys by his similarly irresponsible on-and-off girlfriend Leni. Early in the two weeks, Leni brings the boys a gift of a salamander, which is promptly forgotten about and starves to death.

On his first weekend with the boys, Lenny goes out drinking and meets and goes home with a girl named Roberta. Learning that Roberta is about to travel upstate the next morning with her boyfriend, Lenny impulsively decides to accompany them, bringing his sons along as well. Back home, they are visited by Lenny's Italian friend Salvie, who plays a dangerous game where he stands on the boys' stomachs. Lenny has a scheduling mix-up at his job, working a shift when he was supposed to pick the kids up from school. He solves this problem by changing a reel then running on foot to the school and keeping the kids at the theater with him. There they draw a comic about Lenny peeing in his boss's water cup and print 999 copies.

In order to make time for a date with Leni, Lenny hires his neighbor Jake to watch the kids for a night. The date ends badly when Leni decides to walk along the subway rails and Lenny refuses to join her. Meanwhile, Sage and Frey insert pee into a toy firetruck and shoot it at Jake, who tells Lenny he will no longer watch his kids when he gets back. Leni returns to Lenny's apartment to make up with him just as he gets a call from his boss, who needs him to work overnight and threatens to fire him for the incident with the printer. Lenny does not want the kids to wake up alone in the morning, and since Leni is unable to stay overnight he instead decides to drug them with small doses of a sleeping pill he uses. This causes Sage and Frey to sleep through the day and remain unresponsive into the next night. Lenny has a doctor friend diagnose them, learning that they will be unconscious for at least the next two days.

While Sage and Frey remain unconscious, Lenny steers clear of the apartment as it is now a stressful environment for him. He stays overnight at Leni's apartment but leaves a spare key where it is easily found by a nosy neighbor the next morning. After this Leni cuts contact with Lenny. The next night, he meets with some other friends, but gets all of them arrested by indiscreetly spray-painting on a wall. After Lenny returns home from jail, Sage and Frey finally wake up. Lenny takes them to a park, then a museum where they see a large-scale model of a mosquito and he jokes about having killed a giant mosquito in his apartment. Later that night, the boys are frightened by the prospect of a giant mosquito and can't sleep, even though Lenny insists it's not real.

The next day, the boys return to their mother's custody. Now alone, Lenny grows increasingly discontent, throwing public temper tantrums around his friends and repeatedly calling Leni, who doesn’t pick up. After having a nightmare about the giant mosquito, Lenny abducts his sons from school, convincing their nanny that there was a scheduling mix-up. While cooking for the boys, he sends them to the grocery store with a shopping list. Upon returning they find all the furniture in the apartment packed up, and Lenny reveals they are moving, though the circumstances are left unclear. When Lenny irritates the hired movers enough that they kick him out onto the street, he and the boys carry their belongings around on the sidewalk and load them onto a Roosevelt Island tram.

== Cast ==
- Ronald Bronstein as Lenny
- Sage Ranaldo as Sage
- Frey Ranaldo as Frey
- Victor Puccio as Principal Puccio
- Eleonore Hendricks as Leni
- Sean Price Williams as Dale
- Dakota Goldhor as Roberta
- Aren Topdjian as Aren
- Abel Ferrara as Robber
- Leah Singer as Paige
- Salvie Sansone as Salvie
- Jake Braff as Jake

Josh Safdie makes a cameo appearance as Chris, one of Lenny's coworkers.

== Production ==
The film was loosely based on Josh and Benny Safdie's own experiences with their divorced father. Ronald Bronstein was cast as the lead role Lenny. Sage and Frey Ranaldo, both of whom are Sonic Youth guitarist Lee Ranaldo's sons, portrayed the roles of Lenny's sons. The film was shot in 2008.

== Release ==
The film had its world premiere under the title Go Get Some Rosemary in the Directors' Fortnight section at the 2009 Cannes Film Festival on May 16, 2009. It also screened in the Spotlight section at the 2010 Sundance Film Festival. It was released theatrically in the United States on May 14, 2010, and was released in blu-ray by the Criterion Collection in 2022.

== Reception ==
On review aggregator website Rotten Tomatoes, the film holds an approval rating of 80% based on 35 reviews, with an average rating of 7/10. The website's critical consensus reads, "Raw, honest, and jarring, Daddy Longlegs sets a spellbinding new standard for DIY cinema." On Metacritic, the film has a weighted average score of 74 out of 100, based on 15 critics, indicating "generally favorable" reviews.

Roger Ebert gave the film 3 out of 4 stars, saying that "The film's directors, the Safdie brothers, Ben and Joshua, ... Their cinematic father is obviously John Cassavetes.... If "Daddy Longlegs" is influenced by Cassavetes, well, that's not a bad thing. Few filmmakers have the nerve to travel that path." A. O. Scott of the New York Times remarked that "A risky, heartbreaking exercise in empathy toward a person who may not deserve it.... He (Lenny) is completely appalling, and also completely himself, a kind of mad, disturbing integrity that is both matched and mitigated by the honesty of this lovely, hair-raising film." Chuck Bowen of Slant Magazine gave the film 2 out of 4 stars, writing, "Daddy Longlegs might have been something, a more original than usual treatment of what is basically abuse, if the earlier scenes had been more clearly worked out." Natasha Senjanovic of The Hollywood Reporter commented that the film "may not be wholly successful but it is a very good attempt, thanks especially to the script and acting."

== Awards ==
At the Gotham Independent Film Awards 2010, Ronald Bronstein won the Breakthrough Actor Award for his performance in the film. The film won the John Cassavetes Award at the 26th Independent Spirit Awards.

== See also ==
- Cinephilia
