= Josh Safdie =

American filmmaker (born 1984)

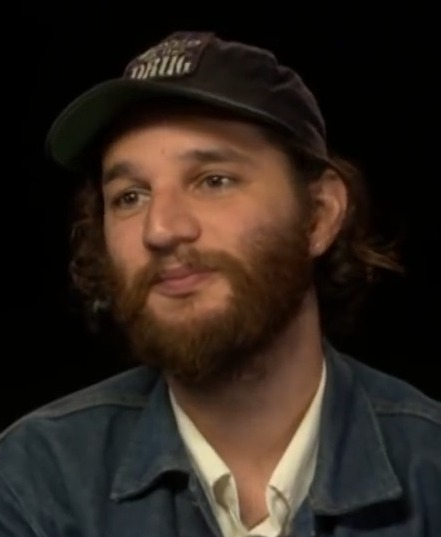
- Safdie in 2017
- Born: Joshua Safdie; April 3, 1984 (age 42); New York City, U.S.
- Education: Boston University
- Occupations: Film director; producer; screenwriter; editor
- Years active: 2007–present
- Spouse: Sara Rossein
- Children: 2
- Relatives: Benny Safdie (brother); Moshe Safdie (great-uncle); Oren Safdie (first cousin once removed); Dov Charney (first cousin once removed)
- Awards: Full list

Joshua Safdie (born April 3, 1984) is an American filmmaker. He is best known for writing and directing the crime thriller films Good Time (2017) and Uncut Gems (2019) with his younger brother Benny Safdie as the Safdie brothers.

In 2024, it was reported that he and his brother would no longer be directing together and would pursue solo careers. His first film since the split, Marty Supreme, was released on December 25, 2025, and earned him four Academy Award nominations, including Best Picture and Best Director. It is his first solo directorial effort since 2008's The Pleasure of Being Robbed.

== Early life and education ==
Joshua Safdie was born April 3, 1984, in New York City to Amy and Alberto Safdie. Safdie is Jewish. His father was born in Italy, raised in France, and is of Syrian-Jewish descent. His mother is of Russian-Jewish descent. His great uncle is architect Moshe Safdie. His cousin once removed is playwright Oren Safdie. He and brother Benny Safdie divided their childhood living between their father in Queens and their mother and stepfather in Manhattan after their parents' divorce.

He attended Columbia Grammar & Preparatory School and graduated from the Boston University College of Communication in 2007.

== Career ==
=== Filmmaker ===
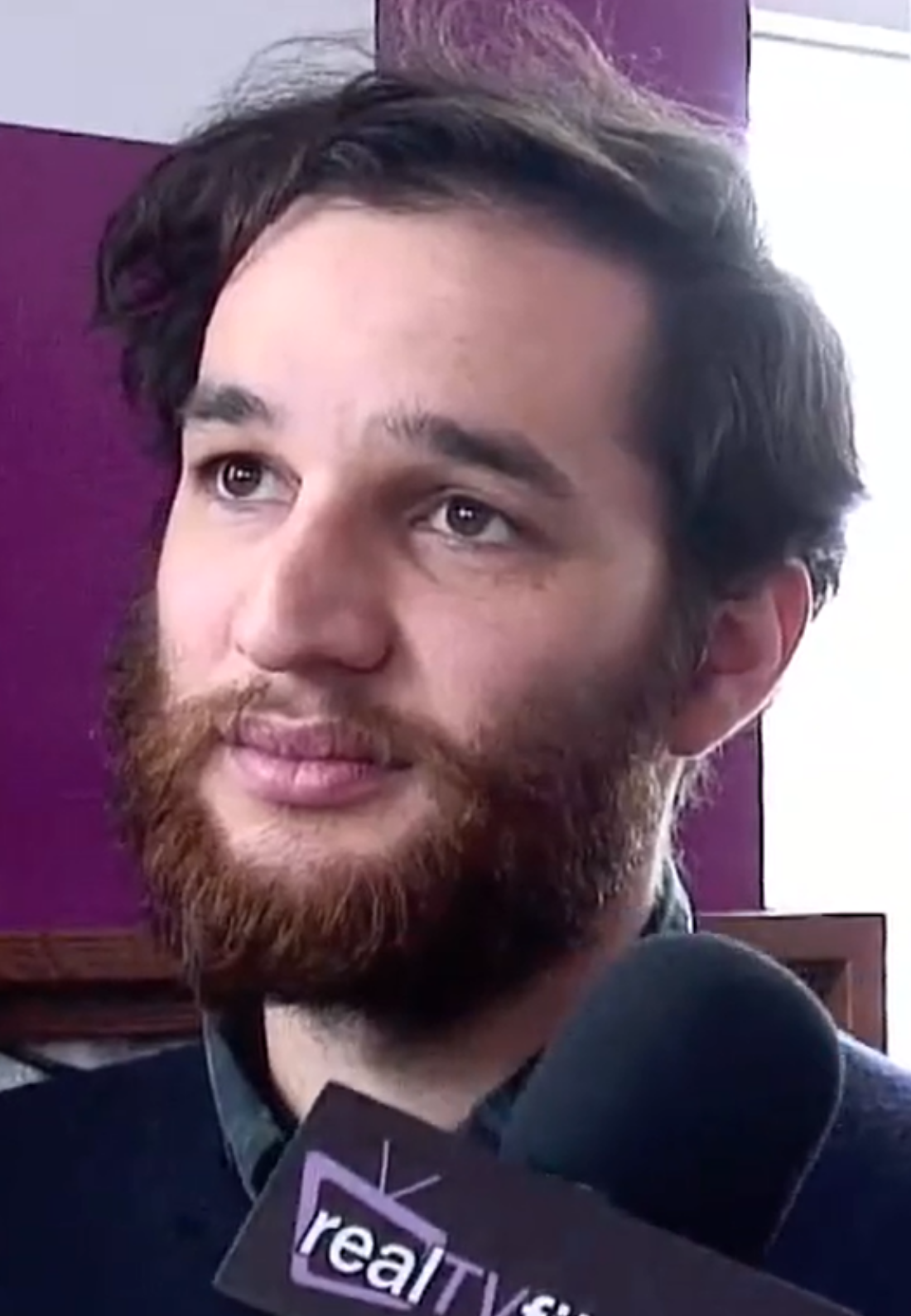
Safdie in 2010

The Safdies' first feature was the 2009 film Daddy Longlegs, which they also wrote the screenplay for and edited together. The film was showcased in the Directors' Fortnight at the 2009 Cannes Film Festival. In 2013, they debuted the documentary film Lenny Cooke at the Tribeca Film Festival, a documentary they became attached to after Cooke approached them to review the footage. In 2014, the pair premiered their next film Heaven Knows What at the 71st Venice International Film Festival. In February 2016, the brothers began filming their crime thriller film Good Time. It premiered at the 2017 Cannes Film Festival, where it competed for the Palme d'Or.

Uncut Gems, Josh and Benny's next film, starred Adam Sandler, LaKeith Stanfield and Julia Fox and was executive produced by Martin Scorsese. The brothers won the Independent Spirit Award for Best Director, and Benny shared the Independent Spirit Award for Best Editing with Ronald Bronstein, with whom he co-edited all the Safdie brother films.

=== Solo career ===
In early 2024, it was reported that Josh and Benny would no longer be directing films together and would pursue solo careers. Benny described the split as amicable, calling it a "natural progression of what we each want to explore."

Josh's first feature as a solo director is Marty Supreme, loosely based on Marty Reisman, a hustler-turned-champion table tennis player. It stars Timothée Chalamet and Gwyneth Paltrow, and was released by A24 on December 25, 2025. His frequent collaborator Ronald Bronstein both co-wrote and edited the film, while Darius Khondji was the cinematographer and Jack Fisk was the production designer. The film's $70 million budget makes it A24's most expensive film.

== Personal life ==
Safdie is married to producer Sara Rossein. They have two children.

== Filmography ==
=== Film ===
Key
†	Denotes films that have not yet been released

Year	Title	Director	Writer	Producer	Editor	Collaboration with Benny	Collaboration with Bronstein	Notes
2008	The Pleasure of Being Robbed	Yes	Yes	Yes	Yes	Yes	No	
2009	Daddy Longlegs	Yes	Yes	No	Yes	Yes	Yes	
2013	Lenny Cooke	Yes	No	No	No	Yes	No	
2014	Heaven Knows What	Yes	Yes	No	No	Yes	Yes	
2017	Good Time	Yes	Yes	No	No	Yes	Yes	
2019	Uncut Gems	Yes	Yes	No	No	Yes	Yes	
2022	Funny Pages	No	No	Yes	No	Yes	Yes	
2025	If I Had Legs I'd Kick You	No	No	Yes	No	No	Yes	
2025	Nirvanna the Band the Show the Movie	No	No	No	No	No	No	Special thanks
2025	Marty Supreme	Yes	Yes	Yes	Yes	No	Yes	Also contributed to the soundtrack
2026	The History of Concrete	No	No	Executive	No	No	Yes	
TBA	Deep Cuts	No	No	Yes	No	No	Yes	
TBA	The Land of Nod	No	No	Yes	No	No	Yes	

=== Television ===
Year	Title	Director	Writer	Producer	Notes
2023	The Curse	No	No	Executive	Miniseries
2023	Telemarketers	No	No	Executive	TV series
2023	Love Has Won: The Cult of Mother God	No	No	Executive	Documentary mini-series
2024	Ren Faire	No	No	Executive	Documentary mini-series
2024	Adam Sandler: Love You	Yes	No	Yes	Netflix comedy special
2025	Pee-wee as Himself	No	No	Executive	Documentary mini-series
2025	Sarah Squirm: Live + in the Flesh	No	No	Executive	HBO comedy special
2026	Neighbors	No	No	Executive	Documentary series
2026	Monsters of God	No	No	Executive	Documentary mini-series
2026	Oobah: Scams for a Better Tomorrow	No	No	Executive	Documentary series
TBA	Superfakes	No	No	Executive	Crime-drama series

=== Advertisements ===
Year	Title	Director	Brand	Ref
2026	Nike ‘Knicks Championship' spot	Yes	Nike	

=== As actor ===
Year	Title	Role	Notes
2006	We're Going to the Zoo	The Hitchhiker	Short film
2006	The Ralph Handel Story	The Director	Voice; short film
2007	The Back of Her Head	Him	Short film
2008	The Pleasure of Being Robbed	Josh	
2008	Yeast	Riverguy 1	
2009	Taking Woodstock	Documentary Cameraman	Uncredited
2009	Daddy Longlegs	Chris	
2009	La corsa	Alessandro	Short film
2013	Lydia Hoffman Lydia Hoffman	Bruce	Short film
2013	Hellaware	Gallery Patron	
2013	Stand Clear of the Closing Doors	Fighter	
2015	This Summer Feeling	Thomas	
2016	Togetherness	Craddock Brother #1	Episode: "Advanced Pretend"
2016	My Art	Tom	
2017	Ezer Kenegdo	Levi	
