= Ronald Bronstein =

American screenwriter (born 1973/74)

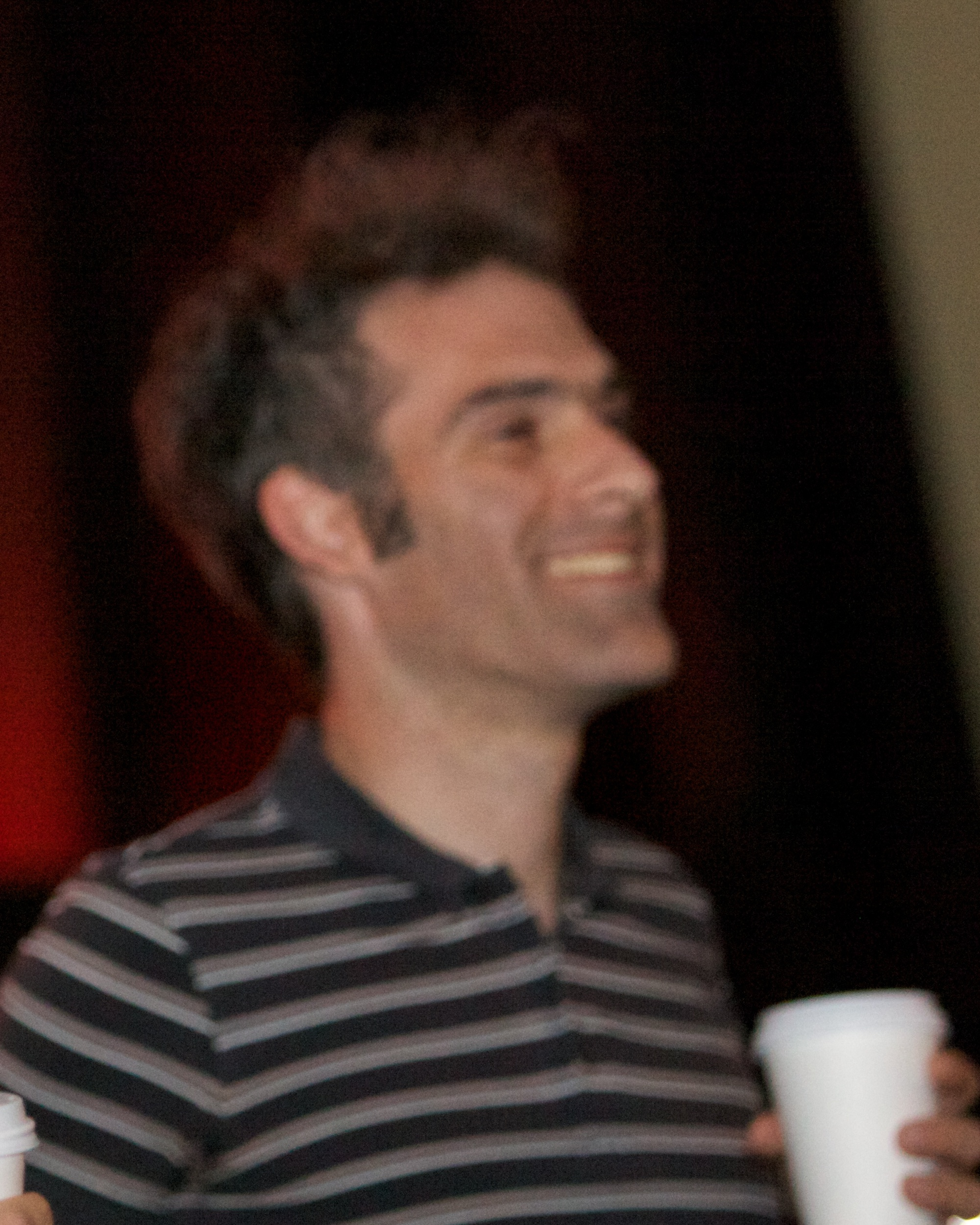
- Bronstein in 2010
- Born: 1973 or 1974 (age 52–53); United States
- Occupations: Filmmaker; screenwriter; editor; actor
- Spouse: Mary Bronstein

Ronald Bronstein (born 1973 or 1974) is an American screenwriter, film editor, director and actor. He directed, wrote and edited the independent film Frownland (2007). He frequently collaborates with the Safdie brothers, notably co-writing and co-editing Good Time (2017), Uncut Gems (2019), and Marty Supreme (2025). For Marty Supreme, he was nominated for Best Picture, Best Original Screenplay, and Best Editing at the 98th Academy Awards.

== Early life ==
Bronstein grew up Jewish in Great Neck on the North Shore of Long Island. He described his family growing up as "functional and supportive."

He attended NYU film school but dropped out.

== Career ==
=== Debut and early career ===
While working on his first feature, Bronstein worked as a projectionist at various art houses around New York City.

He made his debut in 2007 with the film Frownland. He directed, wrote and edited the film. It received critical acclaim and won the Special Jury Award at the 2007 SXSW Film Festival. The film has been described by critics as one of the most bold, original and important independent films of the century. In 2022, it was released as part of The Criterion Collection.

He worked on the film Yeast in 2008 as an assistant and editor. His wife, Mary Bronstein, directed and stars in the film. The film also stars Greta Gerwig. Josh Safdie and Benny Safdie appear in the film.

=== Collaboration with the Safdie Brothers ===
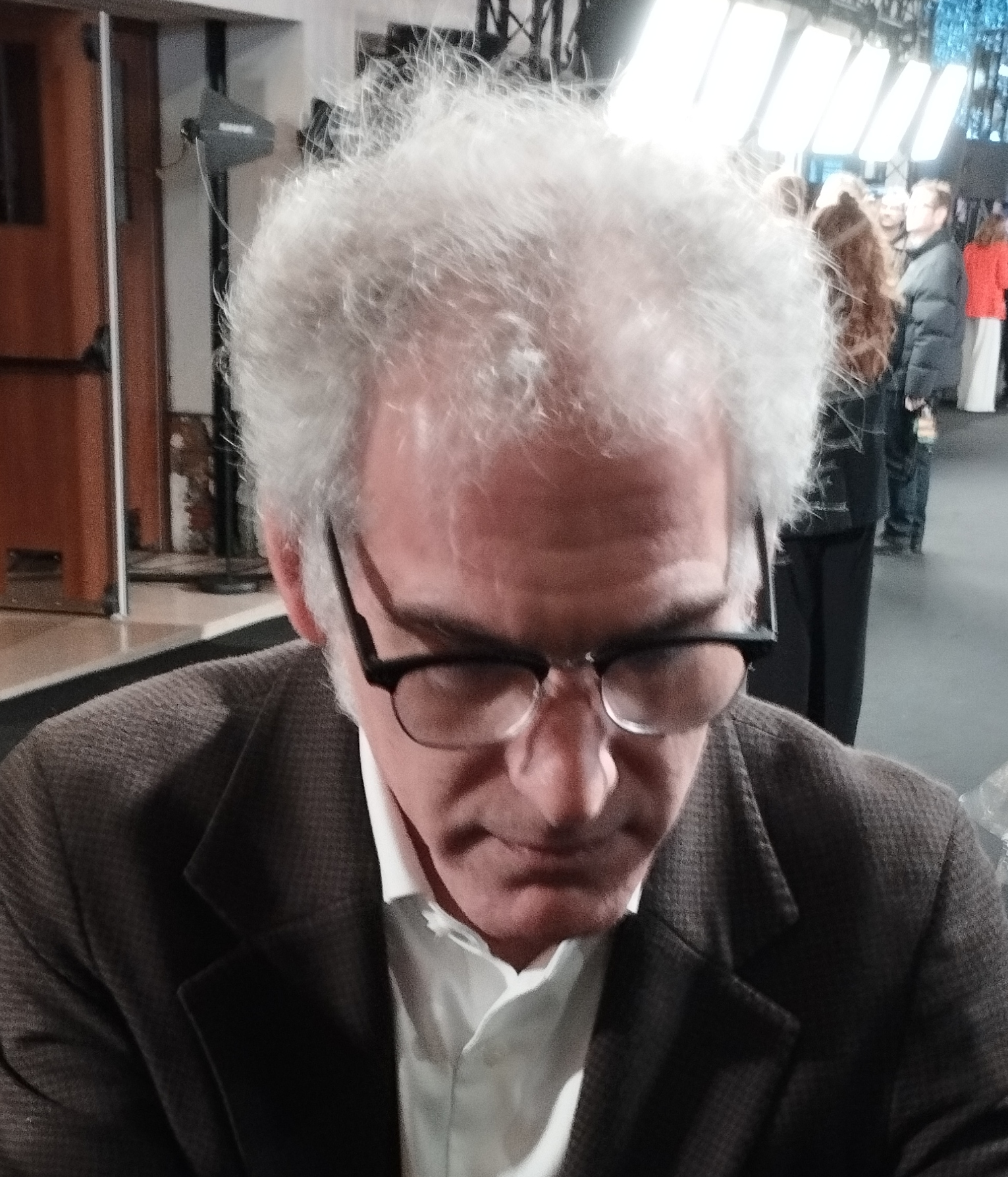
Bronstein in 2026

Bronstein first met the Safdie Brothers at the 2007 SXSW Film Festival. Josh was struck by a speech Bronstein had made at the awards ceremony about anti-careerism and was introduced to him afterwards. They shared a mutual interest for documentary-like fictions and in filmmaking as a behavioral experiment.

In 2009, he began his creative partnership with the Safdie brothers with the film Daddy Longlegs. He co-wrote, edited and also appeared in the film as an actor. He won a Gotham Award for Breakthrough Actor.

In 2014, he co-wrote and co-edited Heaven Knows What.

In 2017, he co-wrote and co-edited the film Good Time starring Robert Pattinson.

In 2019, he co-wrote and co-edited Uncut Gems starring Adam Sandler. The development and writing process was over 10 years, involving 160 drafts. He won an Independent Spirit Award for best editing, sharing the award with Benny Safdie.

After the Safdie Brothers ended their directing partnership in 2024, he continued to collaborate with the Safdies on individual projects. He is a co-writer, editor and producer for Josh Safdie's Marty Supreme starring Timothee Chalamet. It released on December 25, 2025 by A24.

Bronstein formed Central Pictures, a production company alongside Josh Safdie and Eli Bush in 2024. He is also a partner in Elara Pictures with the Safdie brothers.

== Personal life ==
He is married to actress and filmmaker Mary Bronstein.

== Filmography ==
=== Feature films ===
Year	Title	Director	Writer	Editor	Collaboration with Safdie Brothers	Notes
2007	Frownland	Yes	Yes	Yes	No	
2008	Yeast	No	No	Yes	No	Also assistant director
2009	Daddy Longlegs	No	Yes	Yes	Yes	Also actor
2011	Eyes Find Eyes	No	No	No	No	Actor
2014	Heaven Knows What	No	Yes	Yes	Yes	Also actor
2017	Good Time	No	Yes	Yes	Yes	
2019	Uncut Gems	No	Yes	Yes	Yes	
2022	Funny Pages	No	No	No	Producer	
2025	If I Had Legs I'd Kick You	No	No	No	Producer	Also actor
2025	Nirvanna the Band the Show the Movie	No	No	No	No	Special thanks
2025	Marty Supreme	No	Yes	Yes	Josh	Also producer; the voice of Blarney Stone Phone
2027	Lizard Music	No	Yes	TBA	Benny	Post-production
TBA	The Land of Nod	No	No	No	Josh	Producer

== Accolades ==
Year	Ceremony	Category	Work	Result
2026	Academy Awards	Best Picture	Marty Supreme	Nominated
2026	Academy Awards	Best Writing (Original Screenplay)	Marty Supreme	Nominated
2026	Academy Awards	Best Film Editing	Marty Supreme	Nominated
2026	British Academy Film Awards	Best Film	Marty Supreme	Nominated
2026	British Academy Film Awards	Best Screenplay	Marty Supreme	Nominated
2026	British Academy Film Awards	Best Editing	Marty Supreme	Nominated
2020	Critics' Choice Awards	Best Editing	Uncut Gems	Nominated
2026	Critics' Choice Awards	Best Editing	Marty Supreme	Nominated
2026	Critics' Choice Awards	Best Original Screenplay	Marty Supreme	Nominated
2008	Film Independent Spirit Awards	Someone to Watch Award	Frownland	Nominated
2011	Film Independent Spirit Awards	Best Male Lead	Daddy Longlegs	Nominated
2016	Film Independent Spirit Awards	John Cassavetes Award	Heaven Knows What	Nominated
2016	Film Independent Spirit Awards	Best Editing	Heaven Knows What	Nominated
2018	Film Independent Spirit Awards	Best Editing	Good Time	Nominated
2020	Film Independent Spirit Awards	Best Screenplay	Uncut Gems	Nominated
2020	Film Independent Spirit Awards	Best Editing	Uncut Gems	Won
2025	Film Independent Spirit Awards	Best New Non-Scripted or Documentary Series	Ren Faire	Nominated
2026	Film Independent Spirit Awards	Best New Non-Scripted or Documentary Series	Pee-wee as Himself	Won
2026	Golden Globes	Best Screenplay	Marty Supreme	Nominated
2007	Gotham Awards	Best Film Not Playing At Theater Near You	Frownland	Won
2010	Gotham Awards	Breakthrough Actor	Daddy Longlegs	Won
2025	Gotham Awards	Best Feature	If I Had Legs I'd Kick You	Nominated
2025	Gotham Awards	Breakthrough Nonfiction Series	Ren Faire	Nominated
2019	National Board of Review	Best Original Screenplay	Uncut Gems	Won
2025	Primetime Emmy Awards	Outstanding Documentary or Nonfiction Special	Pee-wee as Himself	Won
2025	Primetime Emmy Awards	Outstanding Variety Special (Pre-Recorded)	Adam Sandler: Love You	Nominated
2007	South by Southwest Film Festival	Special Jury Award	Frownland	Won
2026	Writers Guild of America Awards	Best Original Screenplay	Marty Supreme	Nominated
