= Eli Bush =

American film and theatre producer

- Education: Columbia University
- Occupation: Producer
- Years active: 2007–present
- Spouse: Marie Louise Khondji (m. 2022)
- Awards: Tony Award for Best Revival of a Play (2012, 2014); Tony Award for Best Play (2016); Tony Award for Best Revival of a Musical (2017); Golden Globe Award for Best Motion Picture – Musical or Comedy (2018)

Eli Bush is an American film and theatre producer and former executive at Scott Rudin Productions. He is best known for producing the film Lady Bird, for which he co-won the 2018 Golden Globe Award for Best Picture – Musical or Comedy and was co-nominated for the Academy Award for Best Picture.

== Early life and education ==
Bush graduated from Columbia College of Columbia University in 2009.

== Career ==
During his tenure working for Scott Rudin Productions, he and Rudin worked on a number of critically acclaimed movies, including Uncut Gems (2019), Annihilation (2018), Eighth Grade (2018), Lady Bird (2017), and The Girl with the Dragon Tattoo (2011). On Broadway, he won four Tony Awards for Best Revival of a Play: for Death of a Salesman (2012), A Raisin in the Sun (2014), Skylight (2015), and A View from the Bridge (2016). He also won the Tony Award for Best Musical in 2017 for Hello, Dolly! as well as the Tony Award for Best Play in 2016 for producing The Humans. He was nominated for the 2017 Primetime Emmy Award for Outstanding Children's Program for co-producing School of Rock.

In April 2021 stories in The Hollywood Reporter and Vulture alleged numerous instances of abuse from Rudin towards employees, including physical violence. Following the allegations, Rudin announced that he would be "stepping back" to "work on personal issues I should have long ago." The Vulture story also included criticism of Bush enabling Rudin's abuse, with one former co-worker stating, "His job’s to put the pins back up so Scott can go in and knock them back down." The article further reported that Bush had left Scott Rudin Productions the previous week.

In 2022 Bush executive produced Jerrod Carmichael's stand-up special Rothaniel on HBO. The special was subsequently nominated for a Primetime Emmy for Outstanding Directing For A Variety Special and Outstanding Writing For A Variety Special.

In October 2022 Bush produced Kate Berlant’s one-woman show at the Connelly Theater. It was directed by Bo Burnham and marked Berlant's return after more than a decade.

== Filmography ==
=== Film ===
Co-producer

- The Girl with the Dragon Tattoo (2011)
- Extremely Loud & Incredibly Close (2011)
- Moonrise Kingdom (2012)
- Frances Ha (2012)
- The Grand Budapest Hotel (2014)
- Inherent Vice (2014)
- Mistress America (2015)
- Isle of Dogs (2018)

Executive producer

- Captain Phillips (2013)
- Rosewater (2014)
- Ex Machina (2014)
- Aloha (2015)
- Steve Jobs (2015)
- Fences (2016)
- First Cow (2019)
- The History of Concrete (2026)

Producer

- While We're Young (2014)
- Top Five (2014)
- The Meyerowitz Stories (2017)
- Lady Bird (2017)
- Eighth Grade (2018)
- Annihilation (2018)
- The Legacy of a Whitetail Deer Hunter (2018)
- Game Over, Man! (2018)
- 22 July (2018)
- Mid90s (2018)
- The Girl in the Spider's Web (2018)
- Uncut Gems (2019)
- The Woman in the Window (2021)
- If I Had Legs I'd Kick You (2025)
- The Smashing Machine (2025)
- Marty Supreme (2025)
- Slayground (2027)
- The Land of Nod (TBA)

Special thanks

- Share (2019)

=== Television ===
Executive producer

Year	Title	Notes
2012	The Corrections	TV pilot
2013	Aziz Ansari: Buried Alive	TV special
2013	Another Day, Another Time: Celebrating the Music of Inside Llewyn Davis	Documentary
2017	Five Came Back	
2016–18	School of Rock	
2018	Compliance	TV movie
2019	My Favorite Shapes by Julio Torres	TV movie
2019	Diagnosis	Documentary
2019	Gone Hollywood	TV pilot
2020	Devs	
2020	Dispatches from Elsewhere	
2020	Barkskins	
2019−21	What We Do in the Shadows	
2022	Jerrod Carmichael: Rothaniel	TV special
2024	Ren Faire	Documentary
2025	Pee-Wee as Himself	Documentary
2026	Neighbors	Documentary
2026	Monsters of God	Documentary
2026	Oobah: Scams for a Better Tomorrow	Documentary
TBA	Superfakes	

Producer

- The Newsroom (2012−14) (Co-producer)
- Five Days at Memorial (2020)

Consultant

- The Night Of (2016)

=== Theater ===
Year	Title
2011	The Book of Mormon
2012	Death of a Salesman – *Tony Award for Best Revival of a Play
2013	Betrayal
2014	A Raisin in the Sun – *Tony Award for Best Revival of a Play
2014	This Is Our Youth
2014	A Delicate Balance
2015	Skylight – *Tony Award for Best Revival of a Play
2015	Fish in the Dark
2015	The Flick
2015	A View from the Bridge – *Tony Award for Best Revival of a Play
2016	The Humans – *Tony Award for Best Play
2016	The Crucible
2016	Blackbird
2016	Shuffle Along
2016	The Front Page
2016	The Wolves
2017	The Glass Menagerie
2017	A Doll's House, Part 2
2017	Hello, Dolly! – *Tony Award for Best Revival of a Musical
2018	The Iceman Cometh
2018	Carousel
2018	Three Tall Women
2018	The Waverly Gallery
2018	To Kill a Mockingbird
