= Bookatable =

Online restaurant reservation service

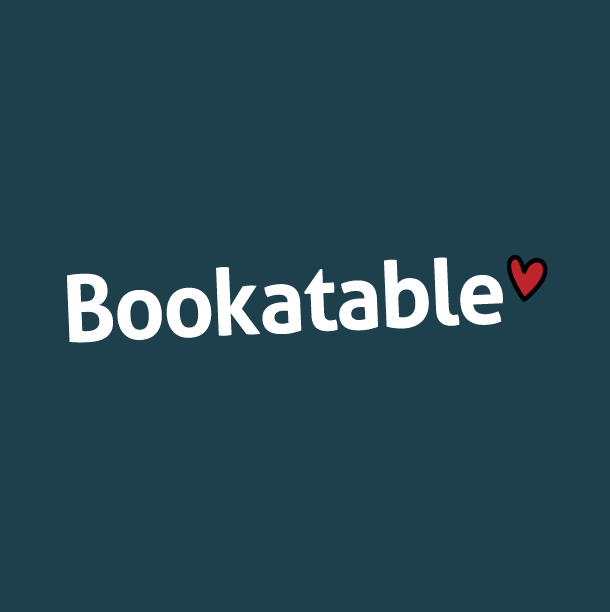
- Company type: Subsidiary
- Website type: Online restaurant reservations
- Available in: English, Swedish, German, French, Norwegian, Danish, Finnish, Spanish, Dutch
- Founded: 2006
- Headquarters: London, England
- Area served: United Kingdom; Sweden; Norway; Finland; Denmark; Germany; Austria; Switzerland; France; Netherlands; Spain; United States; Australia
- Key people: Michel Cassius (CEO)
- Employees: 160+
- Parent: TheFork
- Website: bookatable.co.uk

Bookatable was an online restaurant reservation service headquartered in London, England.

Bookatable was initially known as Livebookings and was founded in 2006. In the early 2010s, Livebookings was rebranded as Bookatable, which was also the name of their German consumer brand. Bookatable provided real-time reservation services for 13,000 restaurants across 12 countries. Diners could also make bookings via Bookatable's consumer-facing websites.

In January 2016, Michelin announced that they had acquired Bookatable, with the intention of accelerating its development in the online restaurant reservation market in Europe.

In December 2019, Michelin sold the company to TripAdvisor as part of a "Strategic partnership" between the two companies.

== Services ==
=== For restaurant customers ===
Restaurants use Bookatable's reservation calendar technology to take table bookings electronically on their own websites. Bookatable also provides restaurant marketing, database management and technical support.

Restaurants using Bookatable's reservation technology include The Ritz, PizzaExpress, T.G.I. Friday’s, Hakkasan, Prezzo, Nobu, OXO Tower, and Beefeater Grill.

=== For diners ===
Users can make real-time reservations via Bookatable's consumer facing websites.

Using Bookatable's Android and iOS apps, diners can view its directory of restaurants, and make bookings directly through the app.

== Acquisitions ==
2Book, a Swedish-based reservations service, was acquired in 2014.

== Funding ==
As of May 2012, Bookatable has raised $62m from investors which include Balderton Capital, Wellington Partners and Ekstranda.

== Partners ==
Bookatable provides a restaurant booking engine for Michelin, Tripadvisor, Relais & Chateaux, Zomato, Eniro, Time Out, tastecard, and Square Meal.

== Markets ==
Bookatable operates in 12 countries across Europe and America.

United Kingdom

Sweden

Norway

Finland

Denmark

Germany

Austria

Switzerland

France

Spain

Netherlands

United States

Australia

== See also ==
- List of websites about food and drink
