= Killer Rezzy =

- Location: Brooklyn, The Hamptons, New York City, San Francisco
- Services: Table reservation
- Website: www.killerrezzy.com

Killer Rezzy is a New York City-based restaurant reservation service for Manhattan, Brooklyn, and the Hamptons.

Killer Rezzy sells reservations for restaurants they partner with as well as restaurants they have no business agreements with. In the case of non-partner restaurants, the reservation will be under another customer's name. Some restaurants are bothered by Killer Rezzy selling reservations to their restaurant when free reservations can be made at OpenTable, Killer Rezzy has offered to remove restaurants upon request.

== See also ==
- List of websites about food and drink
