= Air charter =

On-demand air transportation method

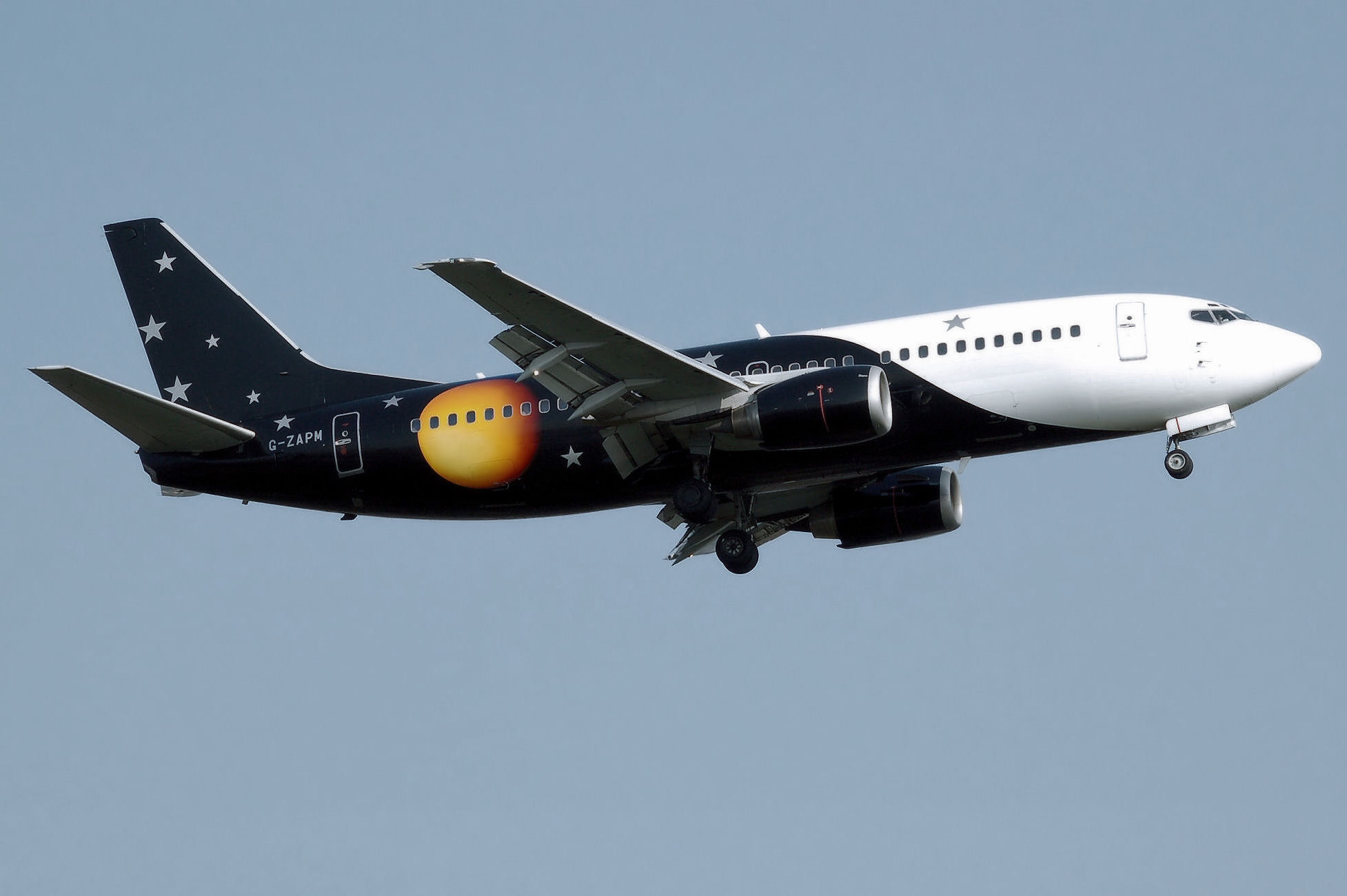
Boeing 737-300 of the UK charter airline Titan Airways

Air charter is the business of renting an entire aircraft (i.e., chartering) as opposed to individual aircraft seats (i.e., purchasing a ticket through a traditional airline).

== Regulation ==
Charter—also called air taxi or ad hoc—flights require certification from the associated country's civil aviation authority. The regulations are differentiated from typical commercial/passenger service by offering a non-scheduled service.

Analogous regulations generally also apply to air ambulance and cargo operators, which are often also ad hoc for-hire services.

=== United States ===
In the United States, these flights are regulated under FAA Part 135.There are some cases where a charter operator can sell scheduled flights, but only in limited quantities. As of 2021, the FAA had made it a priority to crack down on unauthorised charter flights, according to industry experts.

== Types of service ==
There are several business models which offer air charter services from the traditional charter operator to brokers and jet card programs:

- Charter operators – certified by their associated government body, such as the FAA for US carriers, have legal authority to advertise and conduct flights for hire.
- Air charter broker – Charter brokers arrange flights on behalf of their clients, acting as "authorized agents".
- Jet card – Programs offered by both brokers and operators where a customer is offered a fixed hourly rate for a specific jet category and the broker or operator sources a jet from the available charter fleet.
- Online marketplace – Online booking platform where the client can choose and book the desired aircraft directly with the operator.

== Aircraft categories ==
Charter aircraft categories include:

- Seaplanes – examples: DHC-2 Beaver, DHC-3 Otter
- Turbo props – examples: Pilatus PC-12, King Air 350, Piaggio P-180 Avanti
- Light jets – examples: Phenom 300, Citation CJ3
- Mid-cabin jets – examples: Learjet 60, Hawker 800XP
- Super mid-cabin jets – examples: Citation X, Challenger 300
- Large jets – examples: Bombardier Challenger 605, Falcon 900
- Ultra long-range jets – examples: Gulfstream V, Gulfstream G650, Dassault Falcon 7X
- VIP airliners – examples: Boeing Business Jet, Airbus Corporate Jets

There are an estimated 15,000 business jets available for charter in the world. The US market is the largest, followed by the European market with growing activity in the Middle East, Asia, and Central America.

Some charter airlines have employed other types of jets, including Airbus, Boeing, and McDonnell Douglas mainline airliners such as the Douglas DC-10 and Boeing 747. Arrow Air of the United States was such an airline. Among other aircraft, it employed a fleet of 6 DC-10 aircraft from 1983.

== See also ==
- Air taxi
- Aircraft lease
- Commercial aviation
- List of charter airlines
