= Cruise Critic =

Cruise ship review site

- Founded: 1995; 31 years ago
- Headquarters: Needham, MA
- Founders: Anne Campbell and Kathleen Tucker
- Key people: Mark Patscher (General Manager); Colleen McDaniel (Editor in Chief)
- Industry: Travel
- Parent: TripAdvisor
- Website: www.cruisecritic.com

Cruise Critic is a cruise ship review site. The site also offers cruise deals and pricing options.

The site hosts the world's largest online cruise community, with more than 2 million members, 60M+ forum posts, and 700,000+ reviews and photos from cruisers themselves.

== History ==
The review site, CruiseCritic.com, was co-founded in 1995 by Anne Campbell and Kathleen Tucker as a feature of America Online.

In 2007, CruiseCritic.com was acquired by TripAdvisor.

In 2008, Cruise Critic launched its U.K. site, CruiseCritic.co.uk. It launched its Australia site, CruiseCritic.com.au, in 2015.

== Community ==
Cruise Critic developed the first online community in which cruise travelers could meet virtually to share tips, help each other plan and ask questions of fellow cruisers. The community has been active and growing since 1995.

Cruise Critic's Roll Call tool, established in the early 2000's, was the first that allowed cruisers on the same cruise to meet virtually before sailing and plan for onboard get togethers. Its Meet & Mingle onboard events, in conjunction with cruise lines were also the first of their kind.

Cruise Critic's community includes more than 55 million opinions, reviews and photos from actual cruisers around the globe.

== Influence ==
Its team of authoritative editors routinely speak about cruising with media including Good Morning America, TODAY, CNN, Fox Business, The Washington Post, The New York Times, Forbes and AARP.

Developed in 2008, Cruise Critic's annual awards, The Best in Cruise Awards, were the first awards in the cruise industry to be decided based solely on review scores from cruisers. Since then, they have continued to grow and develop to include awards picked by its editors. The Best in Cruise Awards are among the most prestigious in the cruise industry.
