= The Shed at Dulwich =

Hoax by journalist Oobah Butler

- Location within London Borough of Southwark

Restaurant information
- Owner: Oobah Butler
- Rating: 1st in London on TripAdvisor
- Location: Friern Road, SE22 0BB, London, UK
- Coordinates: 51.45°N 0.07°W
- Website: www.theshedatdulwich.com

The Shed at Dulwich was a hoax created by journalist Oobah Butler for Vice Magazine, who pretended his garden shed in Dulwich, London was a fine dining restaurant. The nonexistent restaurant became the top-rated restaurant in London on TripAdvisor before the listing was taken down. The restaurant was open for one night in November 2017, serving ten guests.

The supposed restaurant's menu was themed after "moods". Butler photographed plates of fake food created using household products and personal care supplies such as shaving foam and dishwasher tablets, as well as his own bare foot designed to look like breakfast meat. Moods featured on the menu were Lust, Love, Empathetic, Comfort, Contemplation, and Happy.

Butler had once worked posting fake reviews of other restaurants at a rate of £10 per review, saying, "I'd look at the menu, pick something, and start lying." For The Shed, he asked friends to post fake TripAdvisor reviews in sufficient quantity to place the venue among the top two thousand restaurants in London. The restaurant attracted a single one-star review, from what Butler assumed was a rival.

After becoming the top-rated restaurant on TripAdvisor and bombarded with requests for bookings, Butler staged a genuine opening night for the restaurant, serving thinly-disguised £1 ready meals to ten customers. Having been blindfolded and then led down the alley past his house to the end of the garden and the shed, some said they wanted to return and would recommend it.

The hoax was plausible because micro-restaurants were then a fashionable trend. Chef Tom Kerridge started a real venue called The Shed, opposite his gastropub, The Hand and Flowers, in Marlow. When launched in 2017, it was described as an "intimate private dining space".
