= Aircraft seat map =

An Airbus A380 layout with 519 seats displayed

An aircraft seat map or chair area is a diagram of the seat layout inside a passenger airliner. They are often published by airlines for informational purposes and are of use to passengers for selection of their seat at booking or check-in.

Seat maps usually indicate the basic seating layout; the numbering and lettering of the seats; and the locations of the emergency exits, lavatories, galleys, bulkheads and wings. Airlines that allow internet check-in frequently present a seat map indicating free and occupied seats to the passenger so that they select their seat from it.

In addition to the published seat maps from airliners, there are a number of independent websites which also publish seat maps along with reviews of individual seats, noting the seats that are particularly good (extra legroom, quiet cabin, etc.) or bad (lack of recline, unusually cramped, missing window, etc.).

== Published by airlines ==
Most of the airlines publish the seat configurations for their aircraft, but the quality of these seat maps is sometimes questionable. Some of the details and information about seats are confusing. Usually airlines do not publish seat maps for every aircraft, only for the larger aircraft and for the ones flying on frequent routes.

When passengers complete an online booking, or check in online, they are often also presented with an aircraft seat map. However, this data is typically sourced from the original text-only seat maps on computer reservation systems such as Sabre, where the seat map is simply held as a two-dimensional array and as such can only display a grid of seats, as opposed to the more varied layouts now used in first and business class.

Mike Nicholls, an experimental psychologist, and others, in a study published in 2013, reported that people display a preference for leftward seats on an aircraft, but for rightward seats in a theatre.

== Published by specialised websites ==
In addition to those published seat maps which can be found on airline websites, there are some other websites that publish aircraft seat maps for almost all commercial carriers. Seat maps that can be found on these sites usually have more details, and some websites have comments from passengers with advantages and disadvantages about each seat.

The accuracy and editorial independence of specialised websites showing seat maps have also been questioned. SeatGuru has come under scrutiny since it was sold to the online booking agent Expedia for $1.2m, and Expedia now use the SeatGuru information when selling seats. As a result, SeatGuru has received some criticism for presenting seat maps which are inaccurate and for which no one from the company has travelled on the aircraft; for example, showing bars on aircraft where there are none (on the Singapore A380) or seat rows that do not exist (on the Emirates A380) or airlines that do not exist (like Skylanes, which the website says is based in Chicago).

== Seat designation ==
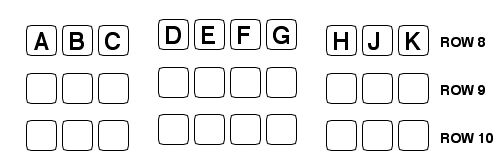
Right-hand 3 seats skip over letter "I"

On many aircraft, the rightmost seats have letter designations HJK, skipping the letter I. This is because each seat has a row number followed by letter; letters that may be confused with numbers (I, O, Q, S, or Z) must be avoided, usually for people with dyslexia. The Digital Equipment Corporation (DEC) was the first to implement this, avoiding I (1), O (0) and S (5). The remaining letters are called the DEC alphabet.

Some airlines may skip some letters because some of the letters are absent from their alphabet (e.g. an airline in Vietnam may have the layout ABC-DEG-HKL in economy class because letters f, j, w, and z are absent from the Vietnamese alphabet).

Occasionally, aircraft with a seating structure of 2+2 may letter the seats as "ACDF" to keep with the standard of A/F being window and C/D being aisle on short-haul aircraft (which generally have 3+3 seats).

In first- and business-class cabins, the seat letters for the window seats will typically be the same as in economy, with some letters skipped in between as there are fewer seats per row. For example, if economy cabin is ten across, labeled ABC-DEFG-HJK, the business-class cabin might be labeled AC-DG-HK for a six-across layout, with A-DG-K for a four-across first class. One notable exception to this is Delta Air Lines, which uses sequential letters regardless of cabin layout on all aircraft (AB-CD-EF in business class and ABC-DEF-GHJ in economy). Some airliners, such as El Al and China Airlines, employ this convention in their narrow-body fleets, designating the seats as ABC-HJK rather than ABC-DEF.

Some airlines omit the row number 13, reputedly because of a widespread superstition that the number is unlucky. This is the case with Lufthansa, for example (as shown on the Lufthansa A321/100 seating plan). Emirates used to have a row 13, but on their latest A380 aircraft have removed it (as shown on Emirates A380-800 seating plan). British Airways is less superstitious, and their seat maps for A320 aircraft show a row 13. Delta Air Lines also includes row 13 in many of their seat maps.

== See also ==
- Seat configurations of Airbus A380
- Wide-body aircraft
- Seating plan
