= Chope (platform) =

Restaurant reservation booking platform

- Industry: Internet
- Founded: June 15, 2011
- Founder: Arrif Ziaudeen
- Headquarters: Singapore
- Area served: Singapore, Hong Kong, Bangkok, Shanghai, Bali, Phuket, Jakarta
- Key people: Arrif Ziaudeen - CEO; Dinesh Balasingam - CBO; Jean Wee - GM
- Products: Online restaurant reservations

Chope is a real-time restaurant-reservation booking platform that connects diners with its partner restaurants. The name “Chope” was inspired by the term chope spoken colloquially in Singapore. Chope charges restaurants fixed and per-diner fees for the use of its table booking system.

Chope was founded on June 15, 2011, with the intention of providing a real-time online service for the process of table reservations.

At the time of its startup, restaurateurs and café owners had been known to be slow to adapt to technological advancements. However, aided by the rise in internet access, this trend has been slowly changing. In July 2012, Chope announced that its application had grown to be used by over 1,000,000 diners.

== Investment and Funding History ==
On June 30, 2015 the company announced it had secured an investment of US$8M in a series C round co-led by F&H Fund Management, a fund chaired by Alibaba CTO John Wu, and NSI Ventures.

In April 2016, the company announced its acquisition of MakanLuar.com - an Indonesian restaurant reservations platform co-founded by Kunal Narang and Hiro Mohinani.

On October 16, 2017, Chope announced that it had raised a Series D funding of US$13M. The round was led by Asia-Pacific investment firm Square Peg Capital and joined by C31 Ventures and Moelis Australia. Existing investors NSI Ventures, Susquehanna International Group, DSG Consumer Partners, and SPH Ventures also came in for a top-up.

Chope was acquired by Grab in 2024. Grab, Southeast Asia's leading super app, purchased Chope as part of its strategy to expand its ecosystem in the food and lifestyle sectors.
