= Seat configurations of Airbus A380 =

The A380-800 layout with 519 seats displayed (16 First, 92 Business and 411 Economy)

The Airbus A380 has two full-length decks, each measuring 49.9 metres (164 ft). The upper deck has a slightly shorter usable length of 44.93 metres (147.4 ft) due to the front fuselage curvature and the staircase. The widths of the main deck and upper deck are 6.50 metres (21.3 ft) and 5.80 metres (19.0 ft) respectively. Passenger capacity depends on the seat configuration chosen by the airline.

Current operational configurations show passenger capacities ranging from 379 (4-class layout in Singapore Airlines) to 615 (2-class layout in Emirates). Since late 2015, Emirates has operated aircraft seating 615 passengers in two classes on the Copenhagen route, replacing the Boeing 777. In total, 15 aircraft have this configuration. Airbus introduced 11-abreast seating for delivery in 2017.

Some airlines have considered configurations with higher seat numbers, including a one-class layout that could accommodate 840 passengers.

A380 cabin cross section, showing economy class seating

== List ==
Customer		Entry Into Service	End Of Service	Total Passengers	Deck	Lower Deck				Upper Deck				Special features
Customer		Entry Into Service	End Of Service	Total Passengers		First	Business	Premium; Economy	Economy	First	Business	Premium; Economy	Economy	Special features
(France)	Air France	20 November 2009	22 May 2020	516	Pitch/bed length/width	81"/79"/35"	–	–	32"/–/17.5"	–	55"/78"/24"	38"/–/19"	32"/–/17.5"	Electronic art gallery; Self-service bars; Changing room
(France)	Air France	20 November 2009	22 May 2020	516	Seats	9	–	–	343	–	80	38	46	Electronic art gallery; Self-service bars; Changing room
(France)	Air France	20 November 2009	22 May 2020	516	Configuration	1–2–1	–	–	3–4–3	–	2–2–2	2–3–2	2–4–2	Electronic art gallery; Self-service bars; Changing room
(Japan)	All Nippon Airways	24 May 2019	Still in service	520	Pitch/bed length/width	–	–	–	32-34"/–/?	?/?/?	?/?/?	?/–/?	–	Couch seats; Bar counters; Multi-purpose room
(Japan)	All Nippon Airways	24 May 2019	Still in service	520	Seats	–	–	–	383	8	56	73	–	Couch seats; Bar counters; Multi-purpose room
(Japan)	All Nippon Airways	24 May 2019	Still in service	520	Configuration	–	–	–	3–4–3	1–2–1	1–2–1	2–3–2	–	Couch seats; Bar counters; Multi-purpose room
(South Korea)	Asiana Airlines	13 June 2014	Still in service	495	Pitch/bed length/width	84"/81"/25.2"	–	–	33"/–/18.9"	–	80.4"/74.5"/21.3"	–	33"/–/18.9"	Self-service bar and lounge
(South Korea)	Asiana Airlines	13 June 2014	Still in service	495	Seats	12	–	–	311	–	66	–	106	Self-service bar and lounge
(South Korea)	Asiana Airlines	13 June 2014	Still in service	495	Configuration	1–2–1	–	–	3–4–3	–	1–2–1	–	2–4–2	Self-service bar and lounge
(United Kingdom)	British Airways	2 August 2013	Still in service	469	Pitch/width	78"/22"	72"/20"	–	31"/17.5"	–	72"/20"	38"/18.5"	31"/17.5"	–
(United Kingdom)	British Airways	2 August 2013	Still in service	469	Seats	14	44	–	199	–	53	55	104	–
(United Kingdom)	British Airways	2 August 2013	Still in service	469	Configuration	1–2–1	2–4–2	–	3–4–3	–	2–3–2	2–3–2	2–4–2	–
(China)	China Southern	17 October 2011	6 November 2022	506	Pitch/width	83"/26.0"	–	–	32"/17.2"	–	77"/24.0"	–	32"/17.2"	Self-service bars
(China)	China Southern	17 October 2011	6 November 2022	506	Seats	8	–	–	352	–	70	–	76	Self-service bars
(China)	China Southern	17 October 2011	6 November 2022	506	Configuration	1–2–1	–	–	3–4–3	–	1–2–1, staggered	–	2–4–2	Self-service bars
(United Arab Emirates)	Emirates	1 August 2008	Still in service	489	Pitch/bed length/width	–	–	–	32–34"/18"	86"/78"/23"	48"/70–79"/18.5"	–	–	Serviced bar and lounge; Self-service bar; Showers
(United Arab Emirates)	Emirates	1 August 2008	Still in service	489	Seats	–	–	–	399	14	76	–	–	Serviced bar and lounge; Self-service bar; Showers
(United Arab Emirates)	Emirates	1 August 2008	Still in service	489	Configuration	–	–	–	3–4–3	1–2–1	1–2–1, staggered	–	–	Serviced bar and lounge; Self-service bar; Showers
(United Arab Emirates)	Emirates	1 August 2008	Still in service	517	Seats	–	–	–	401	14	76	–	–	Serviced bar and lounge; Self-service bar; Showers
(United Arab Emirates)	Emirates	1 August 2008	Still in service	517	Configuration	–	–	–	3–4–3	1–2–1	1–2–1, staggered	–	–	Serviced bar and lounge; Self-service bar; Showers
(United Arab Emirates)	Emirates	1 August 2008	Still in service	516	Seats	–	–	–	426	14	76	–	–	Serviced bar and lounge; Self-service bar; Showers
(United Arab Emirates)	Emirates	1 August 2008	Still in service	516	Configuration	–	–	–	3–4–3	1–2–1	1–2–1, staggered	–	–	Serviced bar and lounge; Self-service bar; Showers
(United Arab Emirates)	Emirates	1 August 2008	Still in service	517	Seats	–	–	–	427	14	76	–	–	Serviced bar and lounge; Self-service bar; Showers
(United Arab Emirates)	Emirates	1 August 2008	Still in service	517	Configuration	–	–	–	3–4–3	1–2–1	1–2–1, staggered	–	–	Serviced bar and lounge; Self-service bar; Showers
(United Arab Emirates)	Emirates	1 August 2008	Still in service	519	Seats	–	–	–	429	14	76	–	–	Serviced bar and lounge; Self-service bar; Showers
(United Arab Emirates)	Emirates	1 August 2008	Still in service	519	Configuration	–	–	–	3–4–3	1–2–1	1–2–1, staggered	–	–	Serviced bar and lounge; Self-service bar; Showers
(United Arab Emirates)	Emirates	1 August 2008	Still in service	615	Pitch/bed length/width	–	–	–	32–34"/–/17.5"	–	48"/70–79"/18.5"	–	32–34"/–/17.5"	Serviced bar and lounge
(United Arab Emirates)	Emirates	1 August 2008	Still in service	615	Seats	–	–	–	437	–	58	–	120	Serviced bar and lounge
(United Arab Emirates)	Emirates	1 August 2008	Still in service	615	Configuration	–	–	–	3–4–3	–	1–2–1, staggered	–	2–4–2	Serviced bar and lounge
(United Arab Emirates)	Etihad	27 December 2014	Still in service	498	Pitch/bed length/width	–	–	–	31"/–/17.5"	80"/80"/29.5"	73"/73"/20"	–	–	9 "First Apartment"; 1 "Residence" for 1–2 passengers with bathroom and bedroom; Shower; Lounge; Prayer rooms
(United Arab Emirates)	Etihad	27 December 2014	Still in service	498	Seats	–	–	–	417	9+2	70	–	–	9 "First Apartment"; 1 "Residence" for 1–2 passengers with bathroom and bedroom; Shower; Lounge; Prayer rooms
(United Arab Emirates)	Etihad	27 December 2014	Still in service	498	Configuration	–	–	–	3–4–3	1–1	1–2–1, staggered	–	–	9 "First Apartment"; 1 "Residence" for 1–2 passengers with bathroom and bedroom; Shower; Lounge; Prayer rooms
(South Korea)	Korean Air	17 June 2011	Still in service	399	Pitch/bed length/width	83"/79"/26.5"	–	–	33–34"/–/18"	–	74"/–/21.6"	–	–	Serviced bar and lounge; Self-service bars/lounges; Duty-free shop
(South Korea)	Korean Air	17 June 2011	Still in service	399	Seats	12	–	–	293	–	94	–	–	Serviced bar and lounge; Self-service bars/lounges; Duty-free shop
(South Korea)	Korean Air	17 June 2011	Still in service	399	Configuration	1–2–1	–	–	3–4–3	–	2–2–2	–	–	Serviced bar and lounge; Self-service bars/lounges; Duty-free shop
(South Korea)	Korean Air	17 June 2011	Still in service	407	Seats	12	–	–	301	–	94	–	–	Serviced bar and lounge; Self-service bars/lounges; Duty-free shop
(South Korea)	Korean Air	17 June 2011	Still in service	407	Configuration	1–2–1	–	–	3–4–3	–	2–2–2	–	–	Serviced bar and lounge; Self-service bars/lounges; Duty-free shop
(Germany)	Lufthansa	6 June 2010	Still in service	509	Pitch/bed length/width	–	–	38"/–/19"	31"/–/18.2"	81"/81"/31"	64"/78"/20"	–	31"/–/18.2"	–
(Germany)	Lufthansa	6 June 2010	Still in service	509	Seats	–	–	52	336	8	78	–	35	–
(Germany)	Lufthansa	6 June 2010	Still in service	509	Configuration	–	–	2–4–2	3–4–3	1–2–1	2–2–2	–	2–4–2	–
(Malaysia)	Malaysia Airlines	1 July 2012	22 December 2022	494	Pitch/bed length/width	89"/87"/26.1"	–	–	32"/–/18"	–	74"/72"/22"	–	32"/–/18"	–
(Malaysia)	Malaysia Airlines	1 July 2012	22 December 2022	494	Seats	8	–	–	350	–	66	–	70	–
(Malaysia)	Malaysia Airlines	1 July 2012	22 December 2022	494	Configuration	1–2–1	–	–	3–4–3	–	2–2–2	–	2–4–2	–
(Australia)	Qantas	20 October 2008	Still in service	485	Pitch/bed length/width	79"/79"/22"	–	–	31"/–/17.5"	–	46"/46"/24"	38–42"/–/19.5"	–	Self-service bar and lounge
(Australia)	Qantas	20 October 2008	Still in service	485	Seats	14	–	–	341	–	70	60	–	Self-service bar and lounge
(Australia)	Qantas	20 October 2008	Still in service	485	Configuration	1–1–1	–	–	3–4–3	–	1–2–1	2–3–2	–	Self-service bar and lounge
(Qatar)	Qatar Airways	10 October 2014	Still in service	517	Pitch/bed length/width	–	–	–	32"/–/18.5"	83"/83"/23"	80"/80"/22"	–	32"/–/18.5"	Serviced bar and lounge
(Qatar)	Qatar Airways	10 October 2014	Still in service	517	Seats	–	–	–	405	8	48	–	56	Serviced bar and lounge
(Qatar)	Qatar Airways	10 October 2014	Still in service	517	Configuration	–	–	–	3–4–3	1–2–1	1–2–1	–	2–4–2	Serviced bar and lounge
(Singapore)	Singapore Airlines	25 October 2007	Still in service	441	Pitch/width	81"/35"	–	38"/19.5"	32"/19"	–	55"/30"	–	32"/19"	2 double beds can be created by combining 2 suites
(Singapore)	Singapore Airlines	25 October 2007	Still in service	441	Seats	12	–	36	245	–	60	–	88	2 double beds can be created by combining 2 suites
(Singapore)	Singapore Airlines	25 October 2007	Still in service	441	Configuration	1–2–1	–	2–4–2	3–4–3	–	1–2–1	–	2–4–2	2 double beds can be created by combining 2 suites
(Singapore)	Singapore Airlines	25 October 2007	Still in service	379	Seats	12	–	36	245	–	86	–	–	2 double beds can be created by combining 2 suites
(Singapore)	Singapore Airlines	25 October 2007	Still in service	379	Configuration	1–2–1	–	2–4–2	3–4–3	–	1–2–1	–	–	2 double beds can be created by combining 2 suites
(Singapore)	Singapore Airlines	25 October 2007	Still in service	471	Pitch/bed length/width	–	–	38"/19.5"	32"/18.5"	?–21"/76"/27"	50"/78"/25"	–	–	Each suite has a swivel chair and a stowed bed
(Singapore)	Singapore Airlines	25 October 2007	Still in service	471	Seats	–	–	44	343	6	78	–	–	Each suite has a swivel chair and a stowed bed
(Singapore)	Singapore Airlines	25 October 2007	Still in service	471	Configuration	–	–	2–4–2	3–4–3	1–1	1–2–1	–	–	Each suite has a swivel chair and a stowed bed
(Thailand)	Thai Airways International	6 October 2012	March 2020	507	Pitch/width	–	–	–	31–32"/18"	82–83"/26.5"	74"/20"	–	31–32"/18"	Self-service bar and lounge
(Thailand)	Thai Airways International	6 October 2012	March 2020	507	Seats	–	–	–	377	12	60	–	58	Self-service bar and lounge
(Thailand)	Thai Airways International	6 October 2012	March 2020	507	Configuration	–	–	–	3–4–3	1–2–1	1–2–1, staggered	–	2–4–2	Self-service bar and lounge

== See also ==
- Wide-body aircraft
