= FlipKey =

Online vacation rental marketplace

- Type: Subsidiary
- Industry: Online vacation rental marketplace
- Founded: 2007
- Headquarters: Boston, Massachusetts; United States
- Area served: Worldwide
- Products: Vacation rentals, travel ratings
- Services: Vacation rental listings, traveler reviews
- Parent: Tripadvisor
- Website: www.flipkey.com

FlipKey was an online vacation rental marketplace and a subsidiary of TripAdvisor. The platform was shut down in November 2024, resulting in the cancellation of all existing reservations. In 2016 the company listed more than 300,000 properties in 179 countries. Its headquarters is in Boston, Massachusetts, United States.

Although rental owners were verified by the company's staff before being added to the FlipKey website, the site relied heavily on traveler reviews of rental properties. FlipKey also published ratings for travel-related items such as food blogs and in the United States it provided ratings of national historic sites.

Citing complaints that FlipKey would not guarantee functional amenities in its rental sites, in 2016 Better Business Bureau gave the company an F rating.

== History ==
FlipKey was founded in 2007 as a house-swapping and vacation rental listing website. The company was acquired by travel website, TripAdvisor, in 2008. That year FlipKey was included in Travel and Leisure's list of top travel websites.

At first Flipkey sold subscriptions to homeowners, operating from offices on Lincoln Street in Boston. After 2013, FlipKey changed its sales model, giving property owners the option of paying a percentage commission for each property rented.

In 2014, FlipKey moved its offices to Causeway Street in Boston, which was also expected to house another Tripadvisor subsidiary, Smarter Travel. That year Flipkey created a virtual tour of Boston for its website, to promote its property listings there.

In 2015, FlipKey updated its technology platform, resulting in complaints from some large property managers that they were being overcharged. In 2017, the city of Coral Gables, Florida, sued FlipKey, claiming that the company had ignored city statutes prohibiting commercial activity in residential areas.

In September 2024, TripAdvisor announced that FlipKey would be shutting down on November 1, 2024, noting that any reservation after that date would be cancelled and refunded. The company said the decision was part of a broader restructuring strategy.

== See also ==
- Holiday cottage
- Vacation rental
