= Tripadvisor =

American online travel company

Tripadvisor, Inc.
- Company type: Public
- Traded as: Nasdaq: TRIP; S&P 600 component
- Founded: February 14, 2000; 26 years ago
- Headquarters: Needham, Massachusetts, U.S.
- Area served: Worldwide
- Founders: Stephen Kaufer; Langley Steinert
- Key people: Matt Goldberg (CEO & President); Michael Noonan (CFO); Greg Maffei (Chairman); Robert S. Wiesenthal (Director)
- Industry: Travel services
- Products: Hotel and flight booking; Vacation rental; Table reservation; Guide books
- Revenue: ▲US$1.83 billion (2024)
- Operating income: ▼US$92 million (2024)
- Net income: ▼US$5 million (2024)
- Total assets: ▼US$2.54 billion (2023)
- Total equity: ▲US$871 million (2023)
- Employees: 2,909 (2025)
- Subsidiaries: Bokun.io; Cruise Critic; FlipKey; TheFork; Holiday Lettings; Singleplatform; Housetrip; Jetsetter; Niumba; SeatGuru; Viator
- Website: www.tripadvisor.com
- Native clients on: iOS, watchOS, Android, Windows, Windows Phone

Tripadvisor is an American company that operates online travel agencies, comparison shopping websites, and mobile apps with user-generated content.

Its namesake brand, Tripadvisor.com, operates in 40 countries and 20 languages, and features approximately 1 billion reviews and opinions on roughly 8 million establishments. The company's other brands include Bokun.io, Cruise Critic, FlipKey, TheFork, Holiday Lettings, Housetrip, Jetsetter, Singleplatform, Niumba, SeatGuru, and Viator. The company is headquartered in Needham, Massachusetts.

In 2023, Tripadvisor earned 25 percent of its revenues from Expedia Group and Booking Holdings and their subsidiaries, primarily for pay-per-click advertising.

Matt Goldberg has been Tripadvisor's CEO and president since July 2022.

== History ==
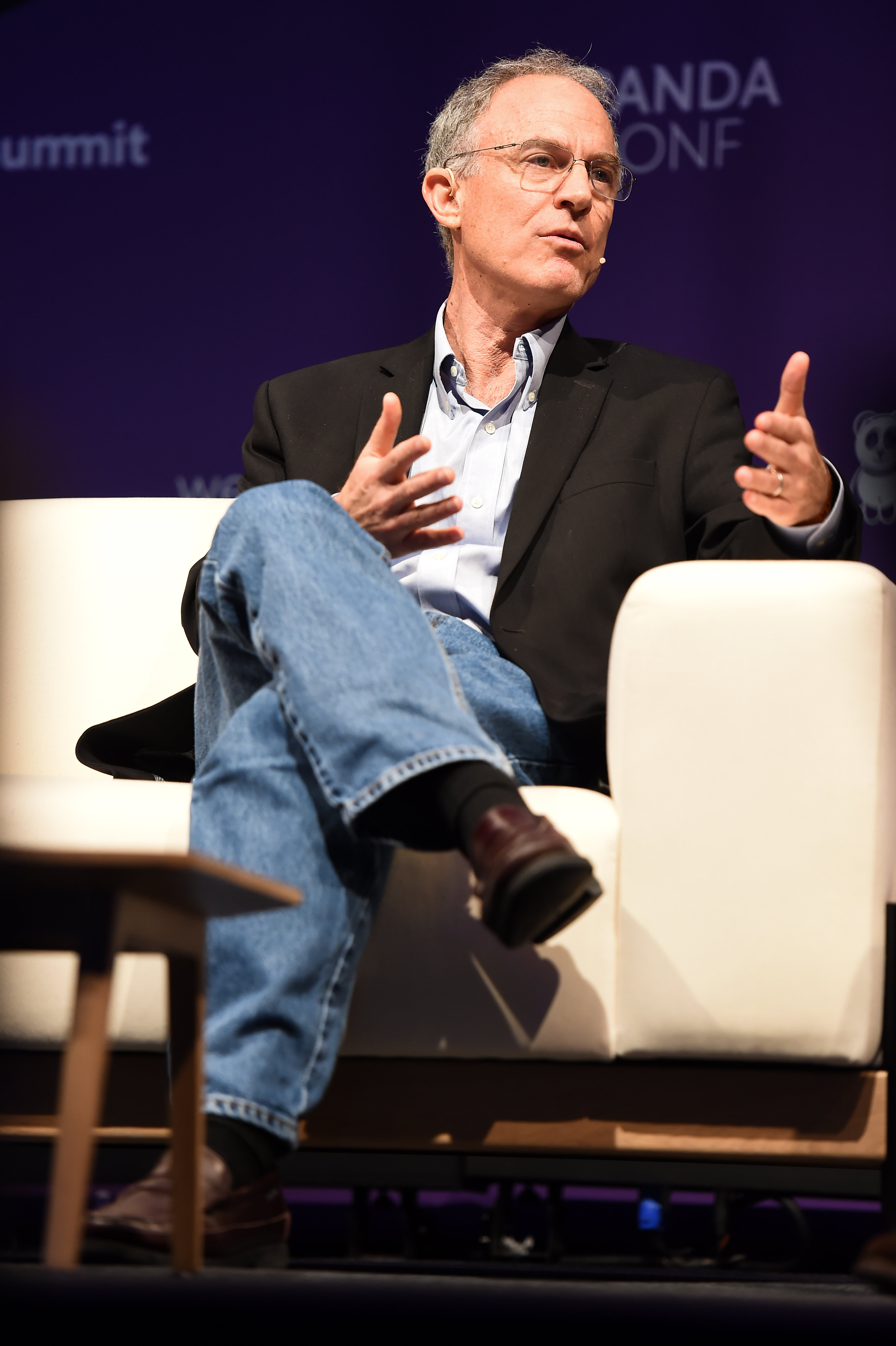
Stephen Kaufer, founder of Tripadvisor

First TripAdvisor logo from February 14, 2000 to January 29, 2020

=== 2000–2009 ===
Tripadvisor LLC was founded by Stephen Kaufer, Langley Steinert, Nick Shanny, and Thomas Palka in February 2000. Kaufer came up with the idea of such a company after being frustrated with planning a family vacation.

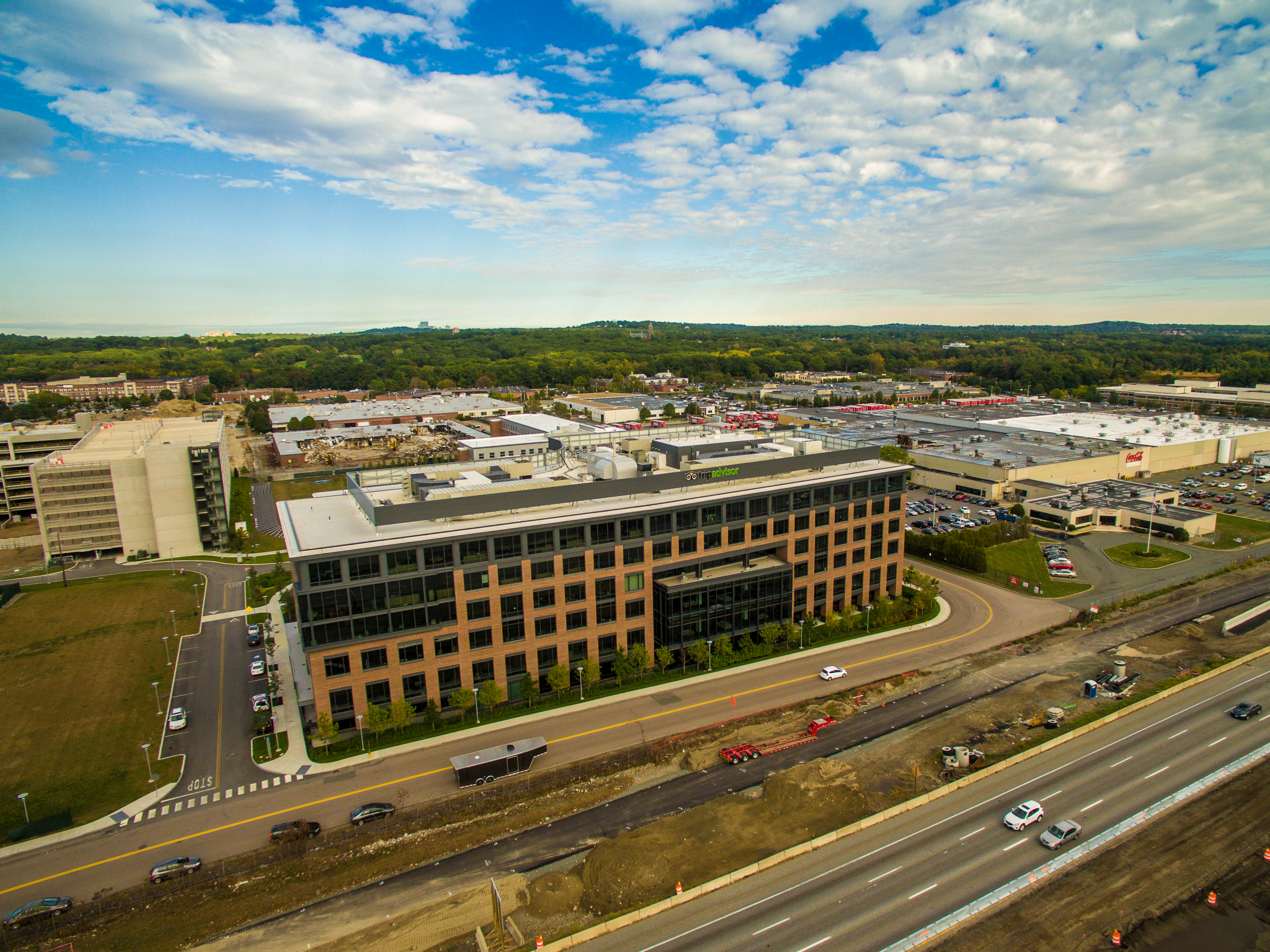
Headquarters in Needham, Massachusetts

In September 2000, before the website was launched, the company obtained $2 million in seed money financing from Flagship Ventures, the Bollard Group, and private investors.

By 2004, the website had 5 million unique visitors per month. That same year, the company was acquired by IAC/InterActiveCorp. In August 2005, IAC spun off its travel group of businesses under Expedia.

In 2007 and 2008, the company acquired several travel-related websites. In 2007, it purchased Smarter Travel Media and its associated sites, including SeatGuru.com and Cruise Critic. In 2008, it acquired Holiday Watchdog, Airfarewatchdog, VirtualTourist, OneTime.com, and a majority stake in FlipKey.

In April 2009, Tripadvisor launched in China. The company acquired Kuxun.cn, China's second-largest consumer travel site and hotel and flight search engine, in October 2009. In August 2015, Kuxun was sold to Meituan.

=== 2010–2019 ===
In June 2010, the company acquired holidaylettings.co.uk, the largest independent vacation rental website in the United Kingdom. In September 2010, SmarterTravel, part of TripAdvisor Media Group, launched SniqueAway (now Jetsetter), the first members-only site where each travel deal is endorsed by member reviews. In July 2011, the company acquired Where I've Been, a Chicago-based Facebook app.

In December 2011, Expedia completed the corporate spin-off of Tripadvisor into a public company, with shares trading on NASDAQ under the symbol TRIP.

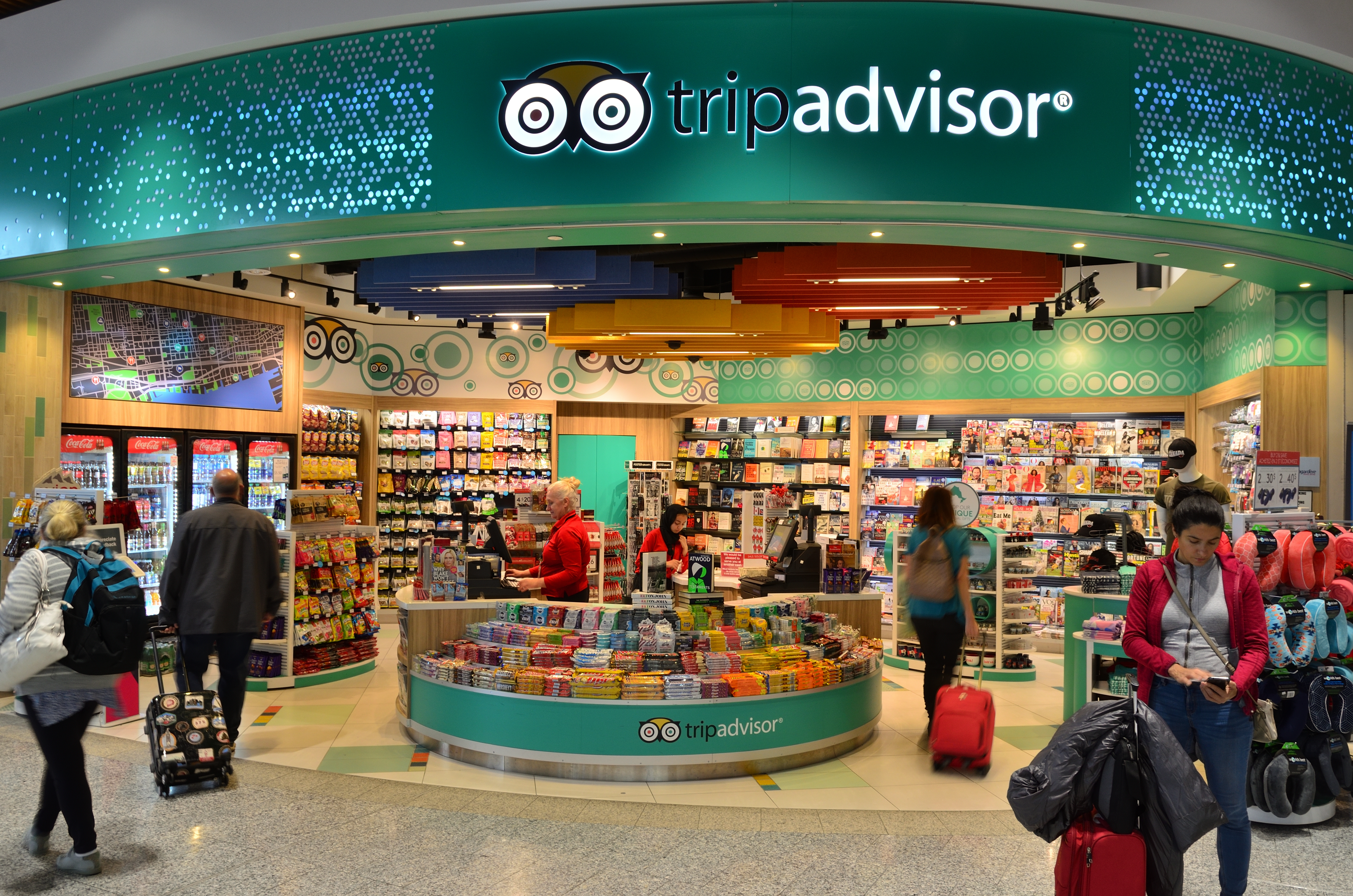
Tripadvisor store at Toronto Pearson International Airport

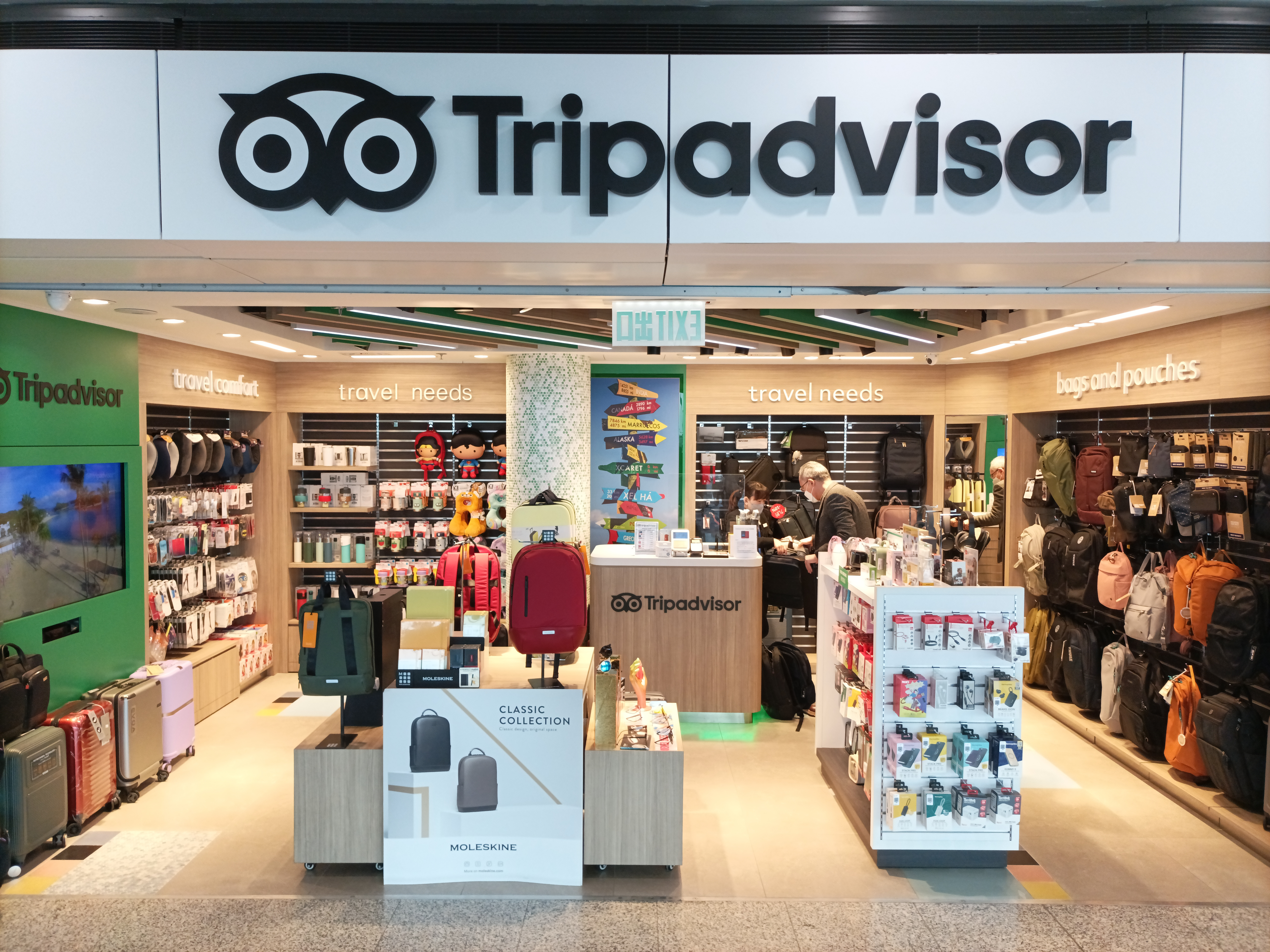
Tripadvisor store at Hong Kong International Airport

Between 2012 and 2014, the company acquired several travel-related businesses. These included Wanderfly in 2012; Jetsetter, GateGuru, and Oyster.com in 2013; and Vacation Home Rentals, Tripod, LaFourchette (later renamed theFork), Viator, Mytable, Restopolis, and Tripbod in 2014.

In 2015, the company acquired Iens, a Dutch restaurant review website; SeatMe, a Dutch table reservation website, ZeTrip, Inc., including its product Rove, a personal journal app; Portuguese startup BestTables, and Australian startup Dimmi for $25 million. In April 2016, the company acquired HouseTrip, a holiday rental marketplace based in London. In August 2016, Tripadvisor acquired Citymaps.com, which developed a social mapping site and cross-platform map engine based on OpenStreetMap data. In April 2018, the company acquired Icelandic startup Bokun, a provider of software for travel booking, and in November 2018, the company added DoorDash to its restaurant listings.

In December 2019, Tripadvisor acquired SinglePlatform, a platform that syndicates restaurant menus, from its parent company, Endurance International Group, for $51 million. The company also acquired BookATable from Michelin Guide.

=== 2020–present ===
Second Tripadvisor logo from January 30, 2020 to July 1, 2025

In February 2020, the company changed its name from TripAdvisor to Tripadvisor, using a lowercase "a".

In April 2020, during the COVID-19 pandemic, Tripadvisor announced 600 layoffs in Canada and the United States and 300 more in other countries as part of a 25% reduction in workforce. The company also closed offices in downtown Boston and San Francisco. In July 2020, Tripadvisor sold 8 brands to Hopjump: Smarter Travel, Airfarewatchdog, BookingBuddy, OneTime, Oyster.com, Family Vacation Critic, What To Pack, and Holiday Watchdog.

On December 8, 2020, China blocked 105 apps, including Tripadvisor, from mobile app stores. The Cyberspace Administration of China stated that the apps were "illegal", and that public concerns were raised around "obscene, pornographic and violent information or fraud, gambling and prostitution".

In December 2020, the Tripadvisor.com website drew 90.2 million visits, and the Tripadvisor app was among the top 10 travel apps in 26 countries as of January 2021.

In May 2022, Matt Goldberg was announced as the new CEO of Tripadvisor, replacing Stephen Kaufer.

In April 2025, Tripadvisor completed a $430 million acquisition of its parent company, Liberty Tripadvisor Holdings.

Between 2024 and 2025, Tripadvisor lost a third of its site visitors, in part due to the rise of AI. By 2026, 60% of its revenue came from partnerships.

In November 2025, Tripadvisor announced plans to merge Viator and Tripadvisor under one team to create a new 'experience-led' operating model. In the same month, the company launched an AI-powered Tripadvisor app within ChatGPT. Users logged-in to ChatGPT can use the app to plan vacations, read reviews, and ask questions. Users can also ask the app to help them plan a specific trip.

== Controversies ==
=== Review system ===
Tripadvisor has been the subject of controversy for allowing unsubstantiated anonymous reviews to be posted about any hotel, bed and breakfast, inn, or restaurant.

In May 2021, Tripadvisor was criticized for allowing an offensive review to be posted about the Auschwitz-Birkenau State Museum in which a visitor described bringing a baby to the gas chambers. Tripadvisor initially stated the review complied with submission guidelines, but later removed it following backlash on social media.

==== Fake reviews ====
The common presence of fake reviews on Tripadvisor's website has led to criticism of the company. In March 2014, Tripadvisor's Chinese site came under significant public scrutiny when one particular user was found to have reviewed 51 Parisian restaurants in one month, while also reviewing 50 hotels in other countries. Separately, in November 2017, Oobah Butler, a journalist for Vice Media, claimed to have made money posting positive reviews for restaurants he never visited, in exchange for payment.

In October 2015, an ex-hotel manager at Meriton said guests were offered inducements to change ratings they left on the site. In 2018, Meriton was fined AU$3 million by the Australian Competition & Consumer Commission for misleading consumers.

In September 2019, the consumer group Which? said that Tripadvisor had not done enough to prevent fake reviews. In a survey of nearly 250,000 reviews of the top ten hotels in ten popular tourist destinations, it found that about one in seven reviews showed clear signs of being fake positive reviews.

==== Phantom establishments ====
In May 2013, a fake restaurant was set up by a disgruntled businessman and reportedly had diners looking for the eatery in an alley filled with rubbish bins. The fake listing went undetected on Tripadvisor for about two months.

In November 2017, journalist Oobah Butler used fake reviews to boost a nonexistent restaurant named The Shed at Dulwich to the top of Tripadvisor rankings for restaurants in London.

==== Crime-related reviews ====
In November 2017, Tripadvisor removed reviews by two women who reported that they were raped at the Iberostar Paraiso Maya in Playa del Carmen in separate incidents in 2010 and 2015. One case involved a hotel security guard. The women said hotel staff promised to contact authorities but did not do so. After the women posted warnings on Tripadvisor, their reviews were deleted. One review was later restored, while the other was not. Reports also identified at least 12 similar incidents at hotels and resorts in Mexico, where warnings posted on Tripadvisor were removed or not published.

==== Malicious reviews ====
In 2012, an action was brought in a Sheriff Court in Scotland by Richard Gollin, the owner of a guesthouse in the Outer Hebrides, who claimed damages for malicious statements. Tripadvisor first asserted that the Scottish courts lacked jurisdiction since it is based in the United States. However, it later conceded that it could be sued in the UK's jurisdiction. The court ruled that Tripadvisor's terms of use constituted a contract, which was actionable/enforceable by the business being reviewed. The case was found to involve issues relating to the Unfair Terms in Consumer Contracts Act of 1977, and these issues were referred to a higher court in Stornoway. The plaintiff eventually dropped the case because he could not afford to pursue it. In March 2015, Dietmar Doering, a German hotelier based in Sri Lanka, accused Tripadvisor of hosting malicious reviews of his resort, The Cosy Beach in Marawila. He claimed he was compelled to take legal action for the estimated damages of US$500,000.

==== Politically motivated reviews ====
In 2019, a guesthouse being used as the headquarters for Reform UK was "trolled" by hundreds of users leaving one-star reviews on Tripadvisor. The guesthouse in Norfolk was owned by the husband of Catherine Blaiklock, the leader of the political party.

=== Improper commercial practices ===
In December 2014, the Italian Antitrust Authority fined Tripadvisor €500,000 for improper commercial practices on the Tripadvisor website. The Italian Authority said Tripadvisor and its Italian arm should stop publishing misleading information about the sources of the reviews. In June 2015, a fake restaurant created by a newspaper rose to the top of the site's rankings in Italy.

In August 2013, Kenneth Seaton lost a $10 million lawsuit against the company in which he claimed that the ranking for his Grand Resort Hotel and Convention Center in Pigeon Forge, Tennessee, as "America's dirtiest hotel" was based on unsubstantiated rumors.

=== Breaches of advertising standards ===
In September 2011, after receiving a complaint submitted by online investigations company KwikChex, the UK Advertising Standards Authority (ASA) launched a formal investigation into Tripadvisor's claims to provide trustworthy and honest reviews from travelers. The ASA found that Tripadvisor "should not claim or imply that all its reviews were from real travellers, or were honest, real or trusted", and as a result of the investigation, Tripadvisor was ordered to remove the slogan "reviews you can trust" from its UK website. It changed its hotel review section slogan to "reviews from our community." Tripadvisor said the branding change had been planned for some time and that changes began in June 2011, before the ASA investigation. ASA commented that "it was concerned that consumers might be fooled by fraudulent posts since the entries could be made without any form of verification", but recognized that Tripadvisor used "advanced and highly effective fraud systems" in an attempt to identify and remove fake content.

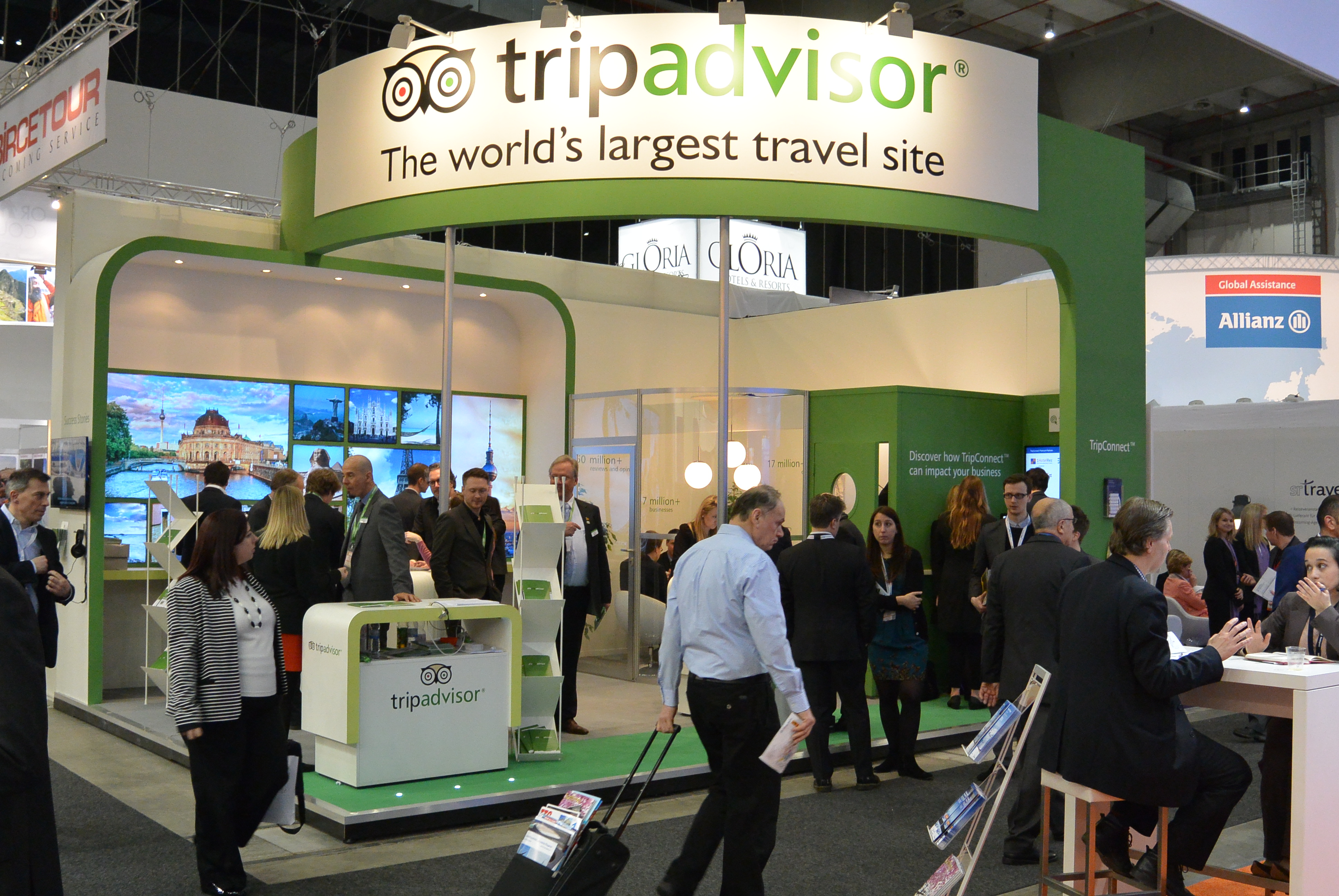
Tripadvisor booth at ITB Berlin, 2014

Approximately 30 hotels have been penalized on the website by the company for suspicious reviews, including a Cornwall hotel that bribed guests to leave positive reviews of the hotel.

Tripadvisor has stated that reviews are subject to a verification process that considers the IP address and email address of the author, and tries to detect any suspicious patterns or obscene or abusive language. The website also allows the community of users to report suspicious content, which is then assessed by Tripadvisor staff.

=== Drip pricing ===
In July 2012, Tripadvisor was fined $80,000 by the United States Department of Transportation for violating fair trading regulations requiring taxes and fees to be shown for prices quoted for airfares, a practice known as drip pricing. The rule had come into effect in January of that year.

=== Involvement in Israeli settlements ===
On 12 February 2020, the United Nations published a database of all business enterprises involved in specified activities relating to the Israeli settlements in the Palestinian territories, including East Jerusalem, and in the Golan Heights. Tripadvisor has been listed on the database in light of its involvement in activities related to "the provision of services and utilities supporting the maintenance and existence of settlements". The international community considers Israeli settlements built on land occupied by Israel to be in violation of international law.

=== Denigration ===
On November 21, 2022, the Paris Commercial Court ordered Tripadvisor to pay €57,000 in damages and other costs to Viaticum, the company that operates the Bourse-des-vols.com website, for denigration.

=== British guest jailed over sexual harassment complaint ===
In 2024, Craig Barratt and his wife, Sarah, a British couple, became involved in a legal dispute in Qatar after Sarah alleged that she had been sexually harassed by two men while staying at the Ritz-Carlton Doha. According to the couple, one of the men asked for her room number and made sexually explicit remarks that caused her to fear for her safety. Barratt subsequently complained to the hotel, whose management allegedly reviewed security footage and identified the men.

Following the incident, Barratt posted a review on Tripadvisor warning that the hotel was unsafe for women. The review was reportedly removed after the hotel complained, and the hotel’s authorised representative subsequently filed a criminal complaint against Barratt under Qatar’s cybercrime legislation. Barratt said that he was not informed of the proceedings and was convicted in absentia by a Qatari court in February 2025.

Barratt discovered the conviction when he was detained at Hamad International Airport in June 2025. According to statements by the couple, he was sentenced to one week in prison, fined 20,000 Qatari riyals and ordered to be deported; the imprisonment sentence was later removed on appeal. He was detained again in October 2025, reportedly spending four nights in custody before being deported from Qatar.

The case attracted attention because of allegations that a hotel guest’s complaint about the handling of sexual harassment resulted in criminal proceedings against her husband. Barratt said that the case had broader implications for international visitors and the use of Qatar’s cybercrime laws, while the account was presented primarily through statements by the couple and media reports. Qatar’s legal system places a high burden on complainants in sexual-assault cases, and sexual relations outside marriage are illegal, according to British government travel guidance.

== Awards ==
In 2019, Tripadvisor was named America's Best Midsize Employer by Forbes.

== See also ==
- Booking.com
- Hotels.com
- KAYAK
