= Niumba =

Online platform for rental vacational accommodations

- Website type: Subsidiary of TripAdvisor
- Founded: 2005; 21 years ago
- Headquarters: Madrid
- Industry: Travel
- Parent: TripAdvisor
- Website: www.niumba.com

Niumba was an online marketplace for arranging or offering lodging, primarily homestays. The website has 334,000 listings, 22% of which are located in Spain. It is a subsidiary of TripAdvisor.

== History ==
Niumba was formed in 2005 by Grupo Intercom, a Barcelona-based business incubator, with María José González-Barros as the co-founder.

In 2013, it was acquired by TripAdvisor.
