= Holiday Watchdog =

Travel website

- Founded: January 2003; 23 years ago
- Headquarters: London, UK
- Founder: Chris Brown; Chris Clarkson
- Industry: Travel

Holiday Watchdog was a London-based travel website and review site.

== History ==
The site was established in June 2002 by Chris Brown, who came up with the idea for a review site whilst working at lastminute.com. He taught himself computer programming from a £17 book. He then partnered with Chris Clarkson, who he met in a chat room, to develop the website and its business relationships.

In 2006, the website began soliciting video clips.

In January 2008, the website was acquired by TripAdvisor after the owners received a "multi-million-pound offer". At that time, the website had 3 million unique visitors per month.

In 2010, the website had turnover of £30 million.

In July 2020, Tripadvisor sold Holiday Watchdog to Hopjump.
