= Oobah Butler =

British writer and filmmaker (born 1992)

- Born: Paul Arthur Oobah Butler; February 13, 1992 (age 34); Birmingham, England, United Kingdom

Comedy career
- Years active: 2015–present
- Medium: journalism; television; film
- Genre: Alternative comedy
- Subjects: Culture of capitalism; reality television
- Website: https://www.oobahbutler.com/

Oobah Butler (born February 13, 1992) is an English author and filmmaker. In 2017, he created The Shed at Dulwich, a fictional restaurant which became the highest-rated venue in London on TripAdvisor despite having never served a dish. In April 2019, Butler published the book How to Bullsh*t Your Way to Number 1, which was a Los Angeles Times bestseller. In 2021 he became co-host of Catfish UK.

He released the Channel 4 documentary films The Great Amazon Heist (2023) and How To Trick Your Way Onto The Property Ladder (2025). He created a five-episode series with A24 called Oobah: Scams for a Better Tomorrow which will be released on HBO in November 2026.

== Early life ==
Born Paul Arthur Oobah Butler in Birmingham, England, he grew up in Feckenham as one of six children. His mother worked as a nurse and later for a funeral home, and his father worked an accounts office job while trading vinyl records on the side. Butler was nicknamed Oobah as a baby, and later made Oobah his legal name. Butler became involved in online mischief with friends as an early teen, including Wikipedia vandalism and catfishing on Hot or Not by posting photos dressed as "a very strange looking woman in her mid-thirties with wigs and stuff, and creepy old guys would comment."

Butler did not attend university. He found freelance digital journalism work where he did a variety of writing including clickbait. Butler later said, "I guess I wasn’t thinking in a grander sense. I just wanted to be a writer, and there were freelance websites where you got those kinds of jobs."

== Vice magazine ==
Butler began writing for Vice Magazine in October 2015 after successfully pitching an story in which he knocked on doors around London to sell CDs using door-to-door sales tactics he learned from Jehovah's Witnesses. He regularly contributed articles to Vice over the next two years, including a story in which he created a "DIY sex robot" from household items and fruit. He also started making short films for Vice social media channels.

=== The Shed at Dulwich ===
In April 2017, inspired by a belief he had developed while being paid to write positive but false reviews for restaurants on TripAdvisor years before, Butler came up with an idea to try and get a restaurant that doesn't exist verified on the travel website. After making a website for his fake restaurant, The Shed at Dulwich, which featured plates of fake food created using household products including shaving foam and dishwasher tablets, and buying a phone, it was officially accepted and listed on the site. From there, Butler spent six months asking friends to post fake reviews hoping to place the restaurant as high on TripAdvisor's list of 18,149 restaurants in London as possible.

On November 1, 2017, The Shed was the highest rated restaurant in London. It was open for one night on the 17th of the same month, serving ten guests thinly-disguised microwaveable meals based on various "moods", at no charge.He covered the experience in an article as well as a documentary about the process, How to Become TripAdvisor's #1 Fake Restaurant, which received more than 100 million views worldwide according to Vice and garnered widespread media coverage. The Washington Post called Butler as "the Donald Trump of TripAdvisor", and the Singaporean parliament referred to the story as it enacted new laws on fake news.

=== Lookalike interviews ===
Butler eventually sent lookalikes do interviews as him, explaining, "Whether it's the segment on Brazil's Globo TV, or the hour-long documentary on Japanese TV, every interviewer has asked me the same questions about the shed. It's not really me being interviewed; what I did has some recognition, but I don't." These impersonators successfully appeared on Breakfast Sunrise in Australia, WION in India, NOVA television in Bulgaria, and BBC Radio 2 in the UK with Vanessa Feltz (standing in for Jeremy Vine). Butler covered the subsequent lookalike interviews in an additional video for Vice.

== Film and TV ==
In June 2018, Butler released a seven-minute film entitled How I Faked My Way to The Top of Paris Fashion Week, in which he masqueraded as fictional fashion designer Georgio Peviani.

In 2021, Butler hosted the British edition of MTV's Catfish: The TV Show alongside Julie Adenuga. In May 2022, a second series of Catfish UK was announced with YouTube personality Nella Rose joining Butler as a new co-host in place of Julie Adenuga.

=== Documentary ===
In October 2023, it was announced Butler had a new documentary on Channel 4 called The Great Amazon Heist, about the company Amazon. The film includes a stunt where Butler collects discarded bottles of urine from Amazon drivers, and sells the contents as a "bitter lemon" drink, manipulating the listing to become a #1 bestseller. It also features a segment where Butler gets a job and works undercover at the Amazon fulfilment centre in Coventry, England, until he is discovered. It was generally well received, earning five stars in the Daily Telegraph and four stars in The Guardian.

In October 2025, Butler released another documentary with Channel 4 titled How I Made £1 Million in 90 Days. The film covers on Butler aiming to set up a business and receive funding from various investors, focusing mainly on cryptocurrency CEOs. The documentary received four out of five stars in The Guardian.

In November 2026, A24 and HBO announced a new five-episode series called Oobah: Scams for a Better Tomorrow, to be released November 22, 2026. The show is fronted by Butler and produced by Abso Lutely Productions alongside Josh Safdie, Eli Bush and Ronald Bronstein.

== Book ==
In December 2018, Butler announced his debut book How to Bullsh*t Your Way to Number 1 in an interview with Forbes. On the date of the book's release, he said in an interview with Robin Young on NPR that the book was less about success and more about helping people to not be inhibited. The book reached first place in an American book chart, #1 Humor in USA Today for the week of April 29, 2019, and was #8 on the Los Angeles Times paperback non-fiction chart in July 2019.

== Awards ==
Butler received three awards in 2018 - one from the British Society of Magazine Editors for Best Content Idea 2018, Video Project of the Year from the British Media Awards, and another from the DRUM Agency for Content Creator of the Year 2018, which he sent a Norwegian stand-in to accept. Butler also received a 2019 Webby Award, using an AI to write his acceptance speech at the ceremony at Cipriani in New York. In July 2023, he won Best Male Personality at the National Reality Television Awards for his work on Catfish UK.
