= Oobah: Scams for a Better Tomorrow =

2026 documentary series

- Genre: Documentary
- Directed by: Daniel Lucchesi
- Country of origin: United States
- Original language: English

Production
- Executive producers: Oobah Butler; Dave Kneebone; Janel Kranking; Eli Bush; Ronald Bronstein; Josh Safdie; Daniel Lucchesi; Tristan Cross; Adam Schwartz; Richie Doyle; Conor Hannon
- Production companies: A24; Abso Lutely Productions; Central Pictures

Original release
- Network: HBO

Oobah: Scams for a Better Tomorrow is an upcoming 2026 American documentary comedy series directed by Daniel Lucchesi for HBO. It follows Oobah Butler as he sets his sights on the biggest industries and institutions, infiltrating various worlds by hatching elaborate and audacious schemes.

It is scheduled to premiere on November 22, 2026.

== Premise ==
Oobah Butler sets his sights on the biggest industries and institutions, infiltrating various worlds by hatching elaborate and audacious schemes, ranging from online reviews, made-up personas and fake companies with bogus backstories.

== Episodes ==
No.	Title >	Directed by	Original release date	U.S. viewers (millions)
1	"Wellness"	Daniel Lucchesi	November 22, 2026	TBD
2	"Wine"	Daniel Lucchesi	November 29, 2026	TBD
3	"Dating Apps"	Daniel Lucchesi	December 6, 2026	TBD
4	"Music"	Daniel Lucchesi	December 13, 2026	TBD
5	"Royalty"	Daniel Lucchesi	December 20, 2026	TBD

== Production ==
Dave Kneebone, Janel Kranking, Eli Bush, Ronald Bronstein and Josh Safdie are among the executive producers, with A24, Abso Lutely Productions and Central Pictures producing.
