= SeatGuru =

Defunct aircraft seating map website

SeatGuru (by Tripadvisor)

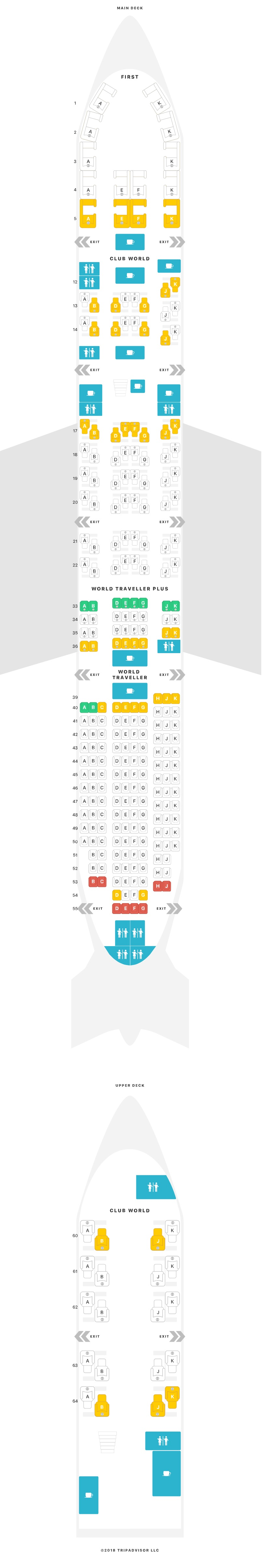
- Screenshot A sample SeatGuru seating chart, that of a British Airways Boeing 747-400
- Website type: Subsidiary of Tripadvisor
- Founded: October 2001; 24 years ago
- Dissolved: October 31, 2025; 10 months ago
- Headquarters: Needham, Massachusetts
- Industry: Travel
- Parent: Tripadvisor
- Website: www.seatguru.com

SeatGuru.com was a website that featured aircraft seat maps, seat reviews, and a color-coded system to identify superior and substandard airline seats. It also featured information about in-flight amenities and airline specific information regarding check-in, baggage, unaccompanied minors and traveling with infants and pets.

== History ==
The website was launched in October 2001 by frequent business traveler Matthew Daimler.

In 2003, the website was enrolled in Google AdSense to generate revenue.

In 2007, SeatGuru was acquired by the Tripadvisor division of Expedia Group.

In December 2011, Expedia completed the corporate spin-off of Tripadvisor.

As of 2020, its app is no longer available in the Apple App Store and Google Play. Blog posts were also discontinued in March 2020.

On 31 October 2025, SeatGuru was officially shut down and began redirecting visitors to TripAdvisor.

Following the closure, alternative aircraft seat map websites include 2LNR, AeroLOPA, SeatMaps.com, FlightSeatmap.com, ExpertFlyer and Seatcompare.ai.

== Awards ==
- Travel + Leisure Top Travel Websites of 2008
- 2007 Webby Awards Honoree, Travel category
