= TheFork Australia =

Online restaurant reservation platform

- Founded: 2009
- Headquarters: Sydney, New South Wales, Australia
- Country of origin: Australia
- Area served: Australia
- Founder: Stevan Premutico
- Employees: 50
- Parent: TripAdvisor & TheFork
- Website: www.thefork.com.au

TheFork Australia (formerly known as Dimmi) was an online restaurant reservation platform founded in 2009 by Australian entrepreneur Stevan Premutico. The company closed its Australian operations in March 2024.

The company provided a cloud-based reservation service to over 4,500 restaurants across Australia. Reservations could be made by diners online through its website.

Dimmi's restaurant reservation engine, dining portal and online bookings was powered by ResDiary.

In January 2024, TheFork announced it would be discontinuing operations in Australia from 31 March 2024.

== History ==
The idea behind Dimmi was created by Stevan Premutico on a coffee shop napkin in 2007. "I was sitting in a coffee shop in Chelsea, thinking about how the internet and online was transforming the hotel business, when it dawned on me that the same impact could change the restaurant business", says Premutico.

In May 2015, TheFork, a Tripadvisor company acquired Dimmi for AUD $25 million.

In June 2016, Dimmi announced a new product, Dimmi Off Peak, designed to fill restaurant tables during quiet times by offering diners a discount on select days and times.

In January 2019, Dimmi announced its rebrand to TheFork operating as part of the TripAdvisor.

On 8 January 2024, in a statement issued online and sent to members, TheFork announced it would be discontinuing operations in Australia from 31 March 2024.
