= Wide-body aircraft =

Airliner with two aisles

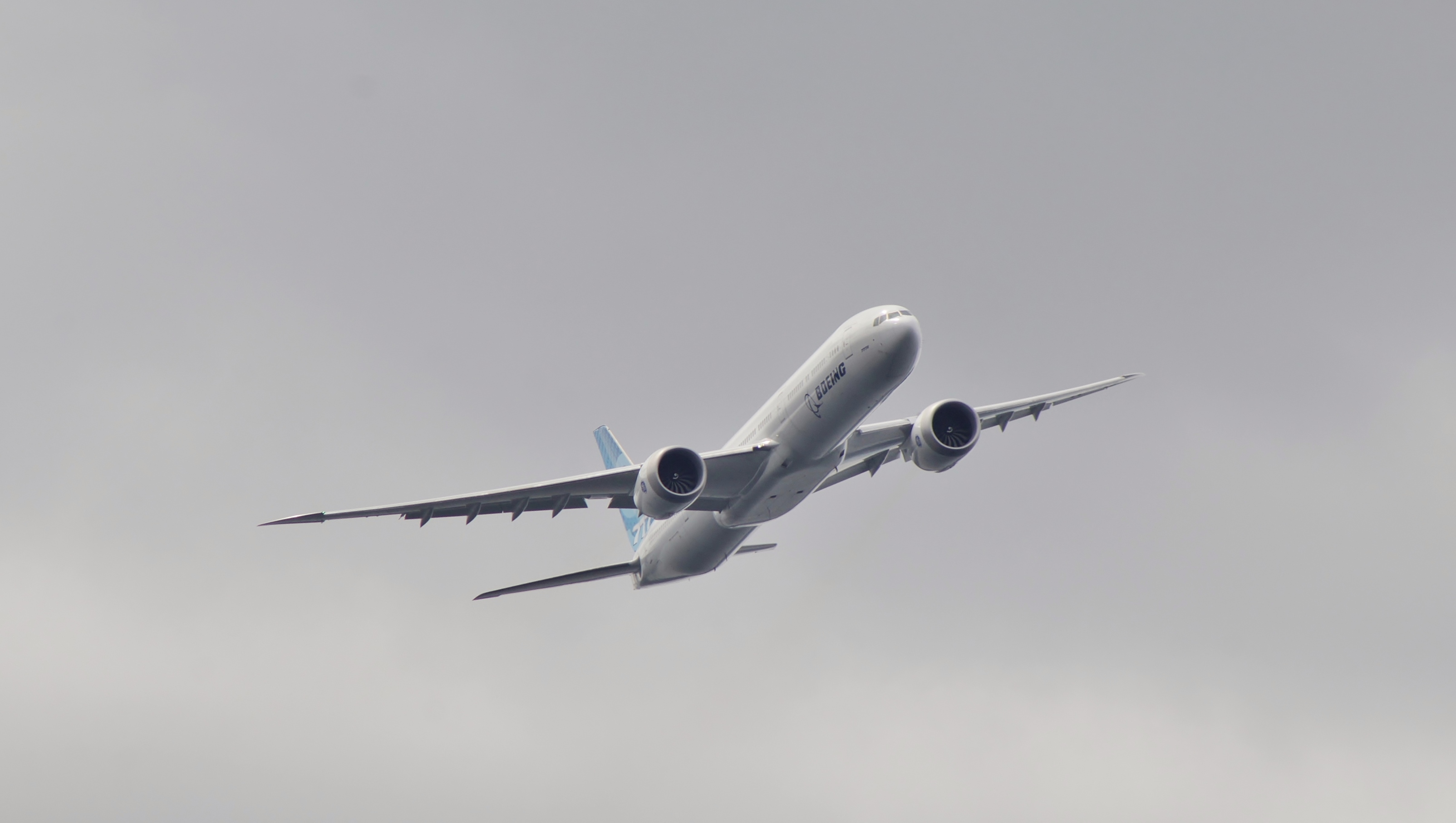
A Boeing 777X. It is under testing and will be the largest twinjet, with the widest and longest fuselage to enter production.

A wide-body aircraft, also known as a twin-aisle aircraft and in the largest cases as a jumbo jet, is an airliner with a fuselage wide enough to accommodate two passenger aisles with seven or more seats abreast. The typical fuselage diameter is 5 to 6 m (16 to 20 ft). In the typical wide-body economy cabin, passengers are seated seven to ten abreast, allowing a total capacity of 200 to 850 passengers. Seven-abreast aircraft typically seat 160 to 260 passengers, eight-abreast 250 to 380, nine- and ten-abreast 350 to 480. The largest wide-body aircraft are over 6 m (20 ft) wide, and can accommodate up to eleven passengers abreast in high-density configurations.

By comparison, a typical narrow-body aircraft has a diameter of 3 to 4 m (10 to 13 ft), with a single aisle, and seats between two and six people abreast.

Wide-body aircraft were originally designed for a combination of efficiency and passenger comfort and to increase the amount of cargo space. However, airlines quickly gave in to economic factors, and reduced the extra space to insert more seats and increase revenue and profits. Wide-body aircraft are also used by commercial cargo airlines, along with other specialised uses.

By the end of 2018, more than 9,100 wide-body airplanes had been delivered, with production peaking at 412 in 2015.

== History ==
=== 1960s ===
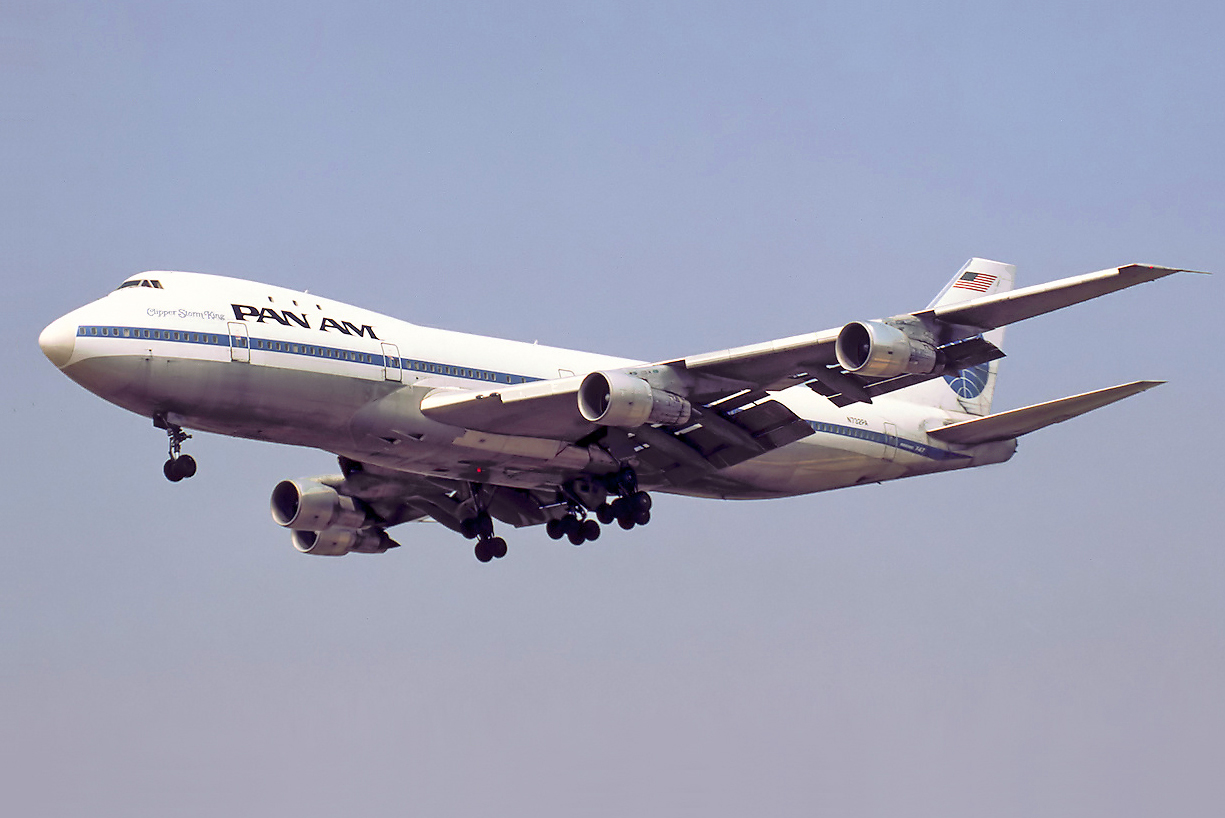
A Boeing 747-100, the first wide-body passenger aircraft, operated by Pan Am, its launch customer in 1970

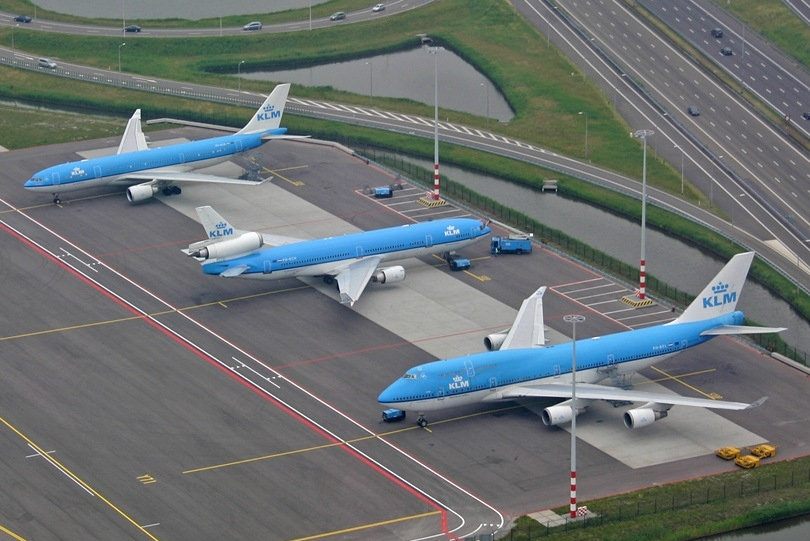
Three widebodies, one in each main engine configuration: KLM's Airbus A330 twinjet, McDonnell Douglas MD-11 trijet and Boeing 747-400 quadjet

Following the success of the Boeing 707 and Douglas DC-8 in the late 1950s and early 1960s, airlines began seeking larger aircraft to meet the rising global demand for air travel. Engineers were faced with many challenges as airlines demanded more passenger seats per aircraft, longer ranges and lower operating costs.

Early jet aircraft such as the 707 and DC-8 seated passengers along either side of a single aisle, with no more than six seats per row. Larger aircraft would have to be longer, higher (double-deck aircraft), or wider in order to accommodate a greater number of passenger seats.

Engineers realised having two decks created difficulties in meeting emergency evacuation regulations with the technology available at that time. During the 1960s, it was also believed that supersonic airliners would succeed larger, slower planes. Thus, it was believed that most subsonic aircraft would become obsolete for passenger travel and would be eventually converted to freighters. As a result, airline manufacturers opted for a wider fuselage rather than a taller one (the 747, and eventually the McDonnell Douglas DC-10 and Lockheed L-1011 TriStar). By adding a second aisle, the wider aircraft could accommodate as many as 10 seats across, but could also be easily converted to a freighter and carry two eight-by-eight freight pallets abreast.

The engineers also opted for creating "stretched" versions of the DC-8 (61, 62 and 63 models), as well as longer versions of Boeing's 707 (-320B and 320C models) and 727 (-200 model); and Douglas' DC-9 (-30, -40, and -50 models), all of which were capable of accommodating more seats than their shorter predecessor versions.

=== 1970s ===
The wide-body age of jet travel began in 1970 with the entry into service of the first wide-body airliner, the four-engined, partial double-deck Boeing 747. New trijet wide-body aircraft soon followed, including the McDonnell Douglas DC-10 and the L-1011 TriStar. The first wide-body twinjet, the Airbus A300, entered service in 1974. This period came to be known as the "wide-body wars".

L-1011 TriStars were demonstrated in the USSR in 1974, as Lockheed sought to sell the aircraft to Aeroflot. However, in 1976 the Soviet Union launched its own first four-engined wide-body, the Ilyushin Il-86.

A cross-section comparison of Airbus A380-800 (double-deck the full length) and Boeing 747-400 (double-deck only in the front section)

After the success of the early wide-body aircraft, several subsequent designs came to market over the next two decades, including the Boeing 767 and 777, the Airbus A330 and Airbus A340, and the McDonnell Douglas MD-11. In the "jumbo" category, the capacity of the Boeing 747 was not surpassed until October 2007, when the Airbus A380 entered commercial service with the nickname "Superjumbo". Both the Boeing 747 and Airbus A380 "jumbo jets" have four engines each (quad-jets), but the upcoming Boeing 777X ("mini jumbo jet") is a twinjet.

The production of the large Boeing 747-8 and Airbus A380 four-engine, long-haul jets has come to an end as airlines are now preferring the smaller, more efficient Airbus A350, Boeing 787 and Boeing 777X twin-engine, long-range airliners.

== Design ==
=== Fuselage ===
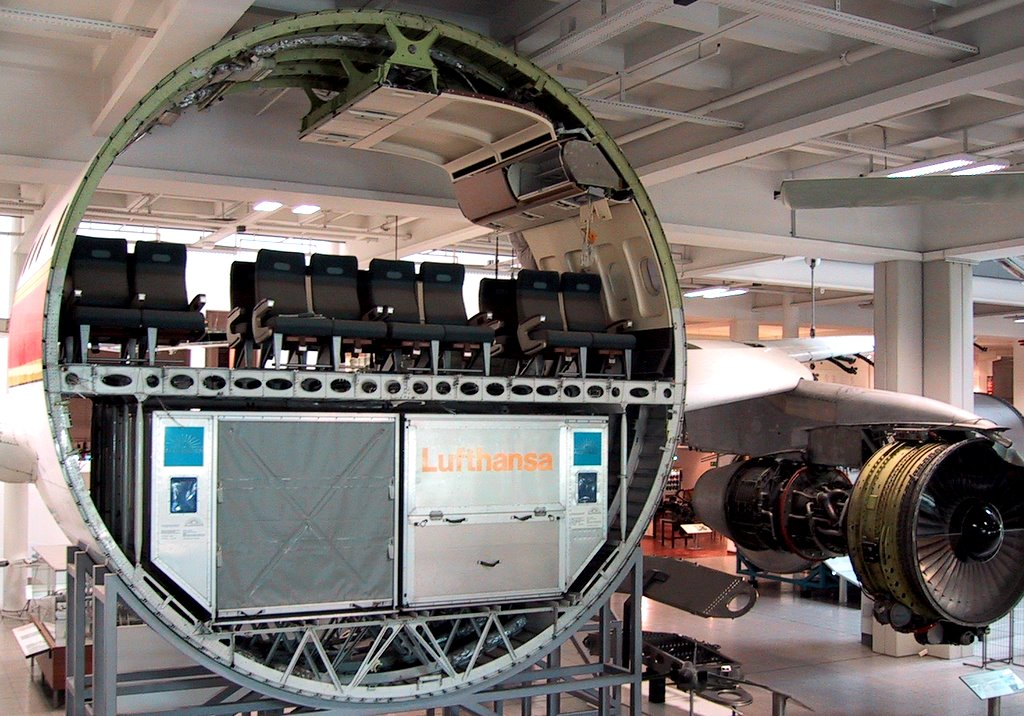
An Airbus A300's cross-section, showing cargo, passenger, and overhead areas

Although wide-body aircraft have larger frontal areas (and thus greater form drag) than narrow-body aircraft of similar capacity, they have several advantages over their narrow-body counterparts, such as:

- Larger cabin space for passengers, giving a more open feeling.
- Lower ratio of surface area to volume, and thus lower drag per passenger or cargo volume. The only exception to this would be with very long narrow-body aircraft, such as the Boeing 757 and Airbus A321.
- Twin aisles that accelerate loading, unloading, and evacuation compared to a single aisle (wide-body airliners typically have 3.5 to 5 seats abreast per aisle, compared to 5–6 on most narrow-body aircraft).
- Reduced overall aircraft length for a given capacity, improving ground manoeuvrability and reducing the risk of tail strikes.
- Greater under-floor freight capacity.
- Better structural efficiency for larger aircraft than would be possible with a narrow-body design.

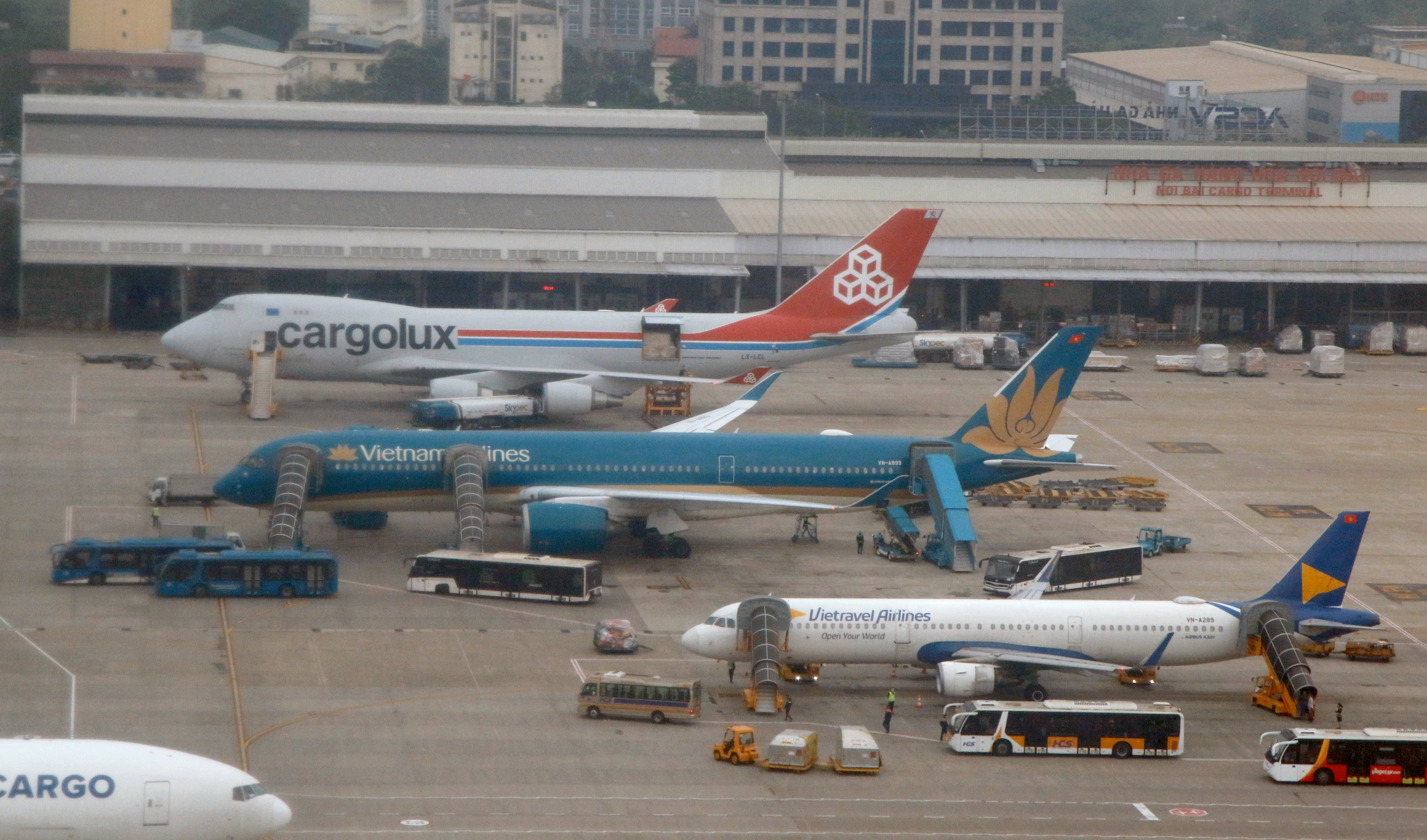
An Airbus A321 of Vietravel Airlines parking next to a Vietnam Airlines Airbus A350-900 and a Cargolux Boeing 747-400 widebodies, highlighting their size differences.

British and Russian designers had proposed wide-body aircraft similar in configuration to the Vickers VC10 and Douglas DC-9, but with a wide-body fuselage. The British BAC Three-Eleven project did not proceed due to lack of government backing, while the Russian Ilyushin Il-86 wide-body proposal eventually gave way to a more conventional wing-mounted engine design, most likely due to the inefficiencies of mounting such large engines on the aft fuselage.

=== Engines ===
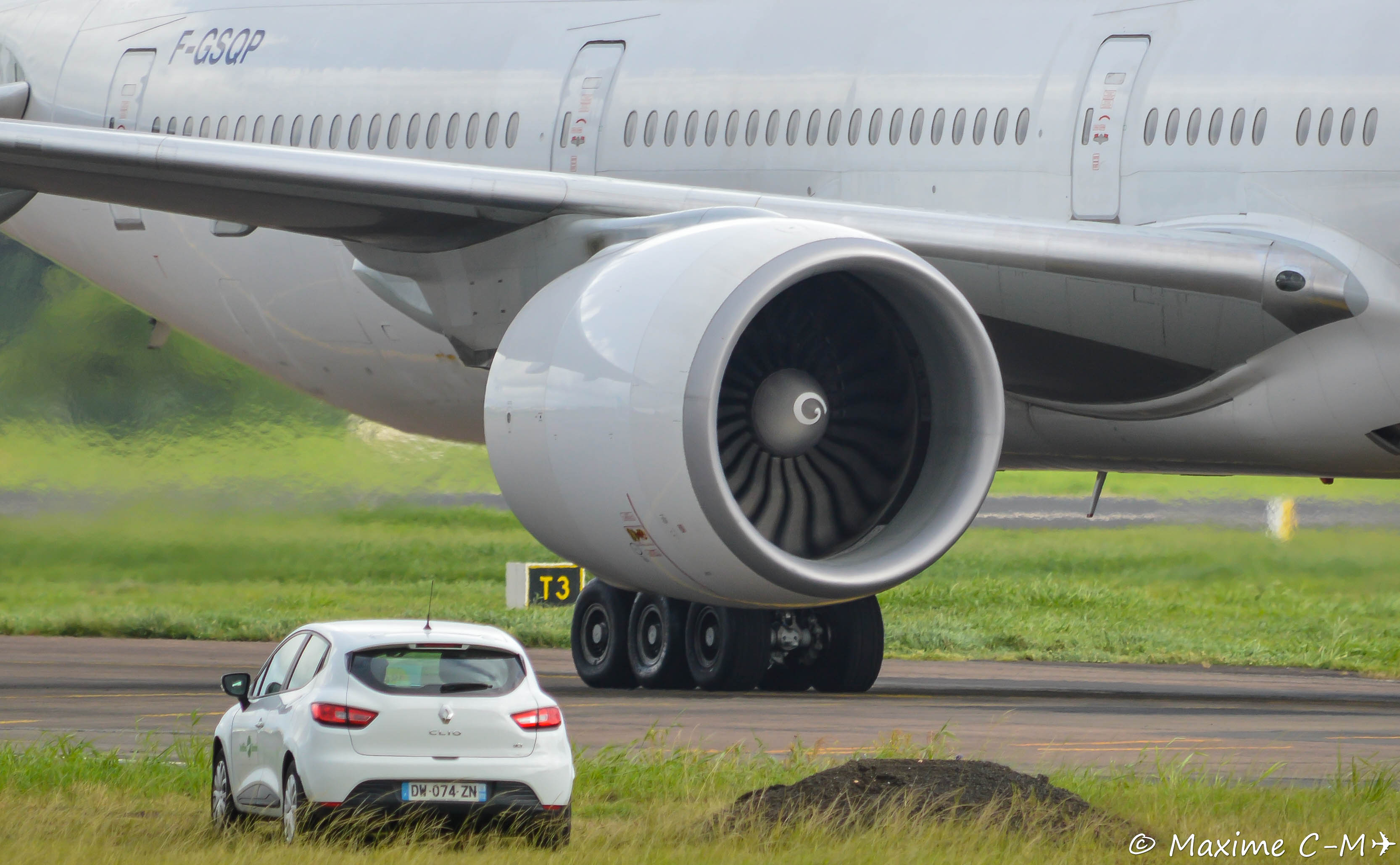
The General Electric GE90 was the most powerful turbofan engine.

As jet engine power and reliability have increased over the last decades, most of the wide-body aircraft built today have only two engines. A twinjet design is more fuel-efficient than a trijet or quadjet of similar size. The increased reliability of modern jet engines also allows aircraft to meet the ETOPS certification standard, which calculates reasonable safety margins for flights across oceans. The trijet design was dismissed due to higher maintenance and fuel costs compared to a twinjet. However, the heaviest wide-body aircraft, the Airbus A380 and the Boeing 747-8, are built with four engines. The upcoming Boeing 777X-9 twinjet is approaching the capacity of the earlier Boeing 747.

The Boeing 777 twinjet features the most powerful jet engine, the General Electric GE90. The early variants have a fan diameter of 312 centimetres (123 in), and the larger GE90-115B has a fan diameter of 325 centimetres (128 in). This is almost as wide as the 3.30 metres (130 in) Fokker 100 fuselage. Complete GE90 engines can only be ferried by outsize cargo aircraft such as the Antonov An-124, presenting logistics problems if a 777 is stranded in a place due to emergency diversions without the proper spare parts. If the fan is removed from the core, then the engines may be shipped on a Boeing 747 Freighter. The General Electric GE9X, powering the Boeing 777X, is wider than the GE90 by 15 centimetres (6 in).

The 560 tonnes (1,230,000 lb) maximum takeoff weight of the Airbus A380 would not have been possible without the engine technology developed for the Boeing 777 such as contra-rotating spools. Its Trent 900 engine has a fan diameter of 290 centimetres (116 in), slightly smaller than the GE90 engines on the Boeing 777. The Trent 900 is designed to fit into a Boeing 747-400F freighter for easier transport by air cargo.

=== Interior ===
The interiors of aircraft, known as the aircraft cabin, have been undergoing evolution since the first passenger aircraft. Today, between one and four classes of travel are available on wide-body aircraft.

Bar and lounge areas which were once installed on wide-body aircraft have mostly disappeared, but a few have returned in first class or business class on the Airbus A340-600, Boeing 777-300ER, and on the Airbus A380. Emirates has installed showers for first-class passengers on the A380; twenty-five minutes are allotted for use of the room, and the shower operates for a maximum of five minutes.

Depending on how the airline configures the aircraft, the size and seat pitch of the airline seats will vary significantly. For example, aircraft scheduled for shorter flights are often configured at a higher seat density than long-haul aircraft. Due to current economic pressures on the airline industry, high seating densities in the economy class cabin are likely to continue.

In some of the largest single-deck wide-body aircraft, such as the Boeing 777, the extra space above the cabin is used for crew rest areas and galley storage.

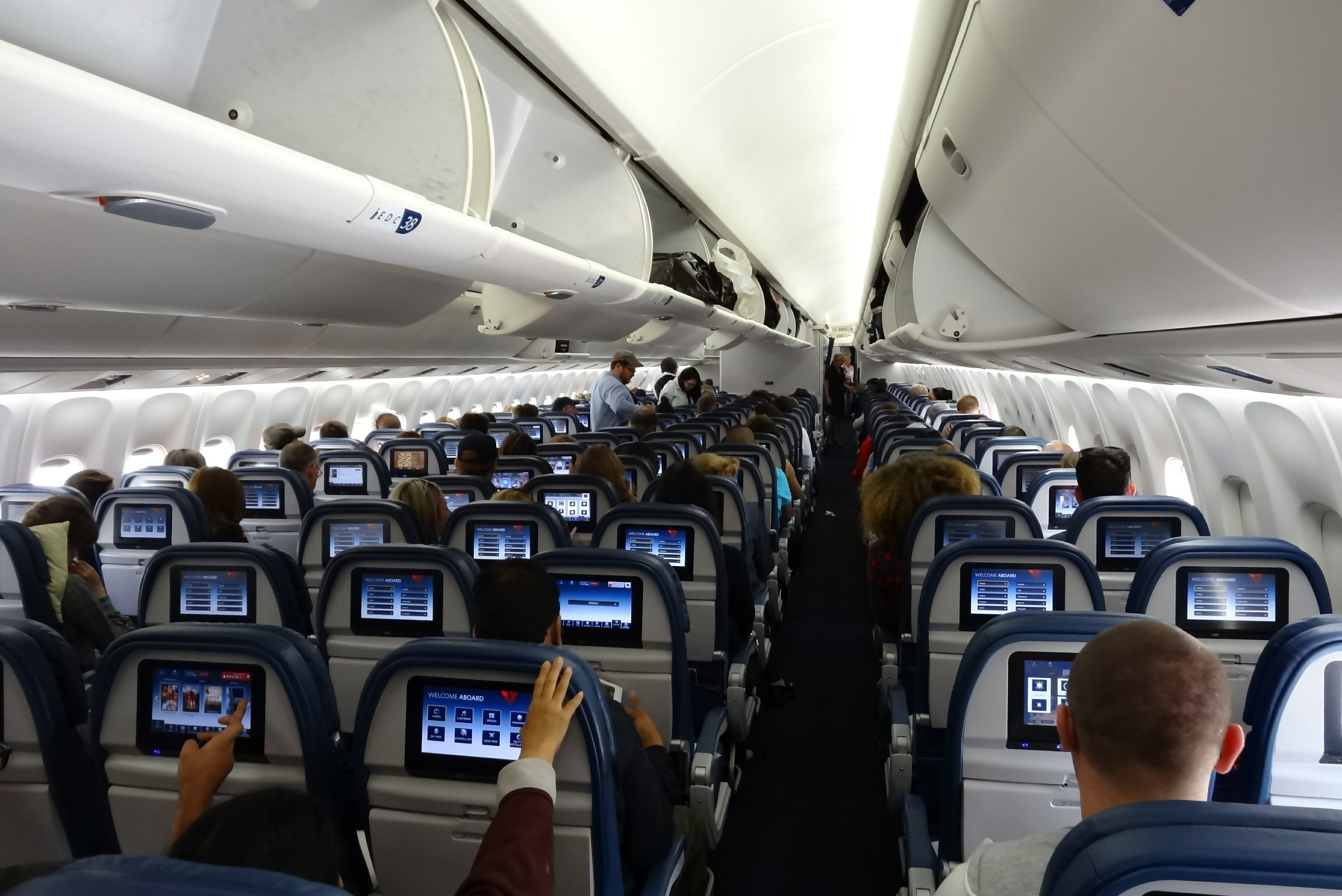
Delta Air Lines' economy class cabin on a Boeing 767

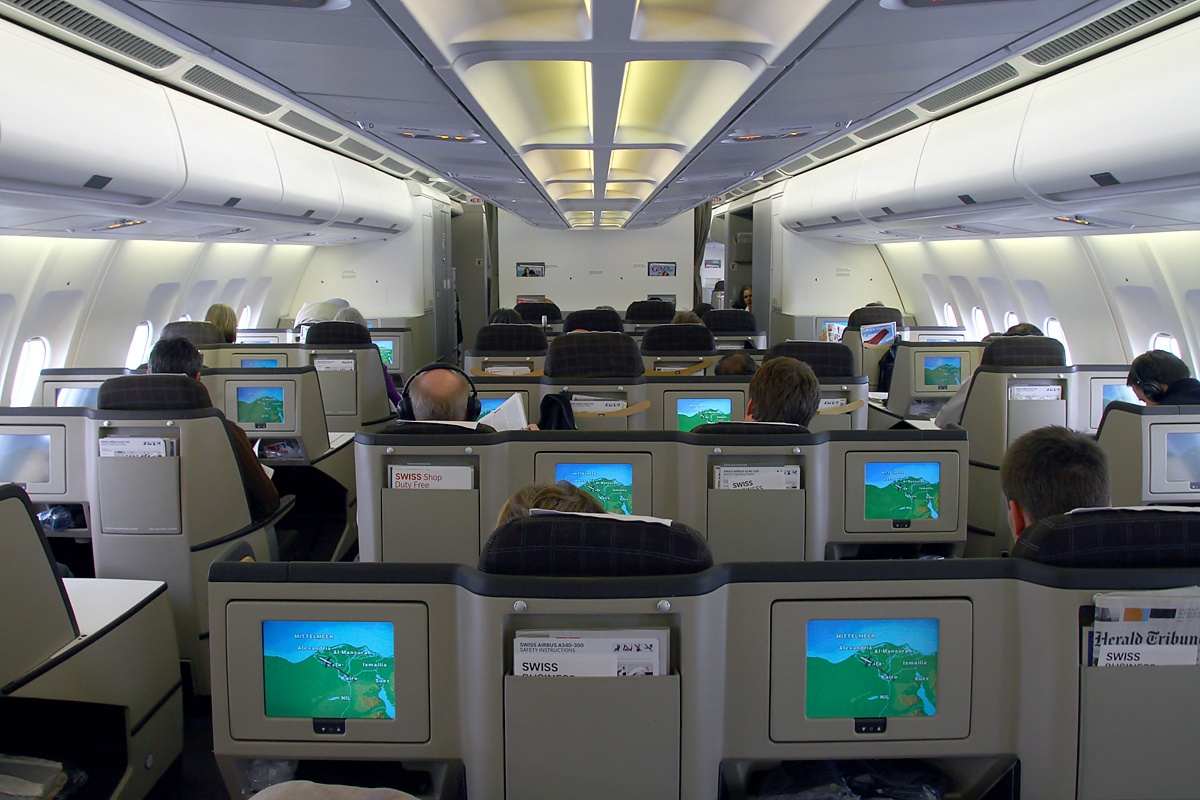
Swiss International Air Lines' business class cabin on an Airbus A340

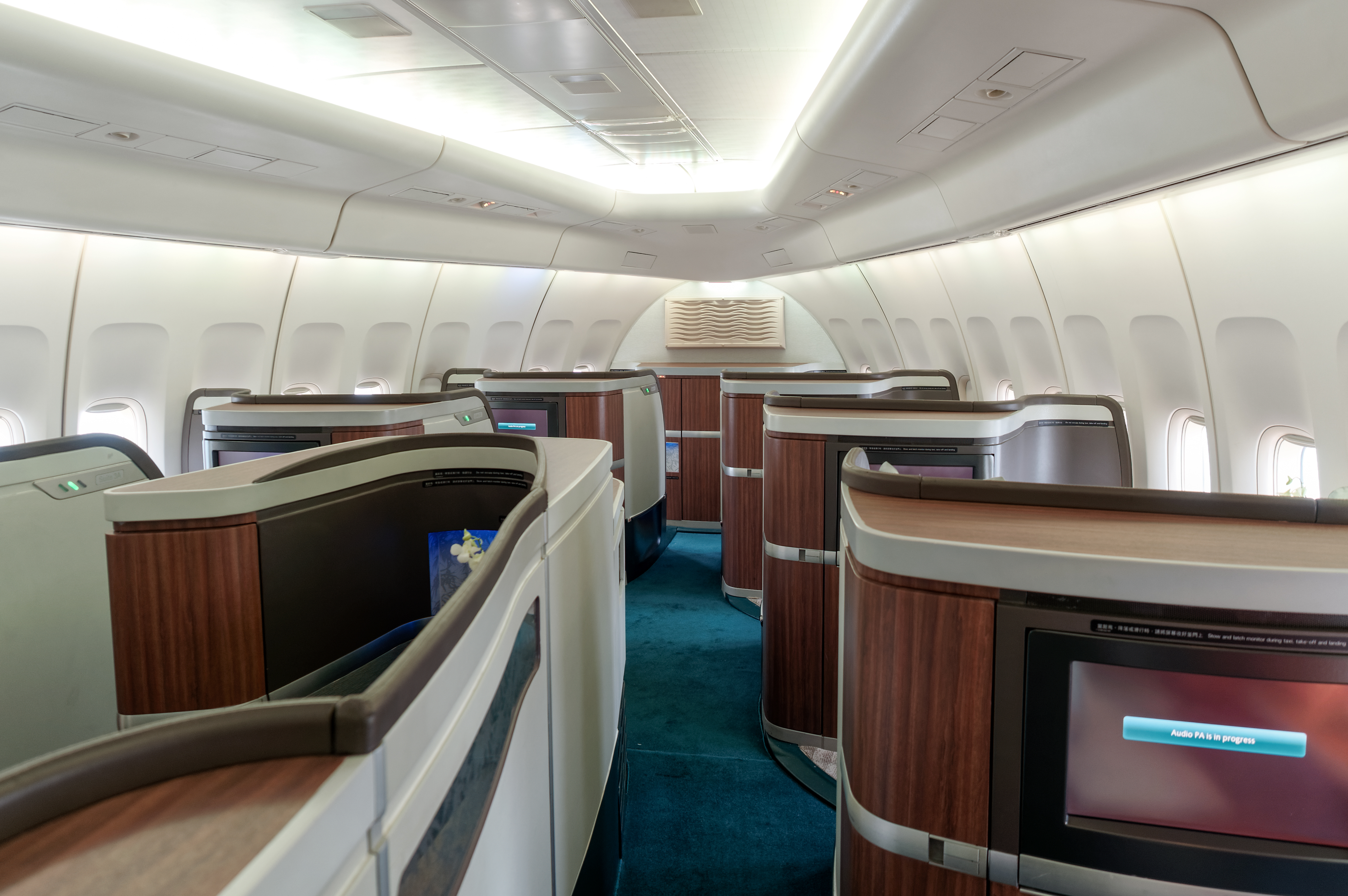
Cathay Pacific's first class cabin on board a Boeing 747-400

== Jumbo jets ==
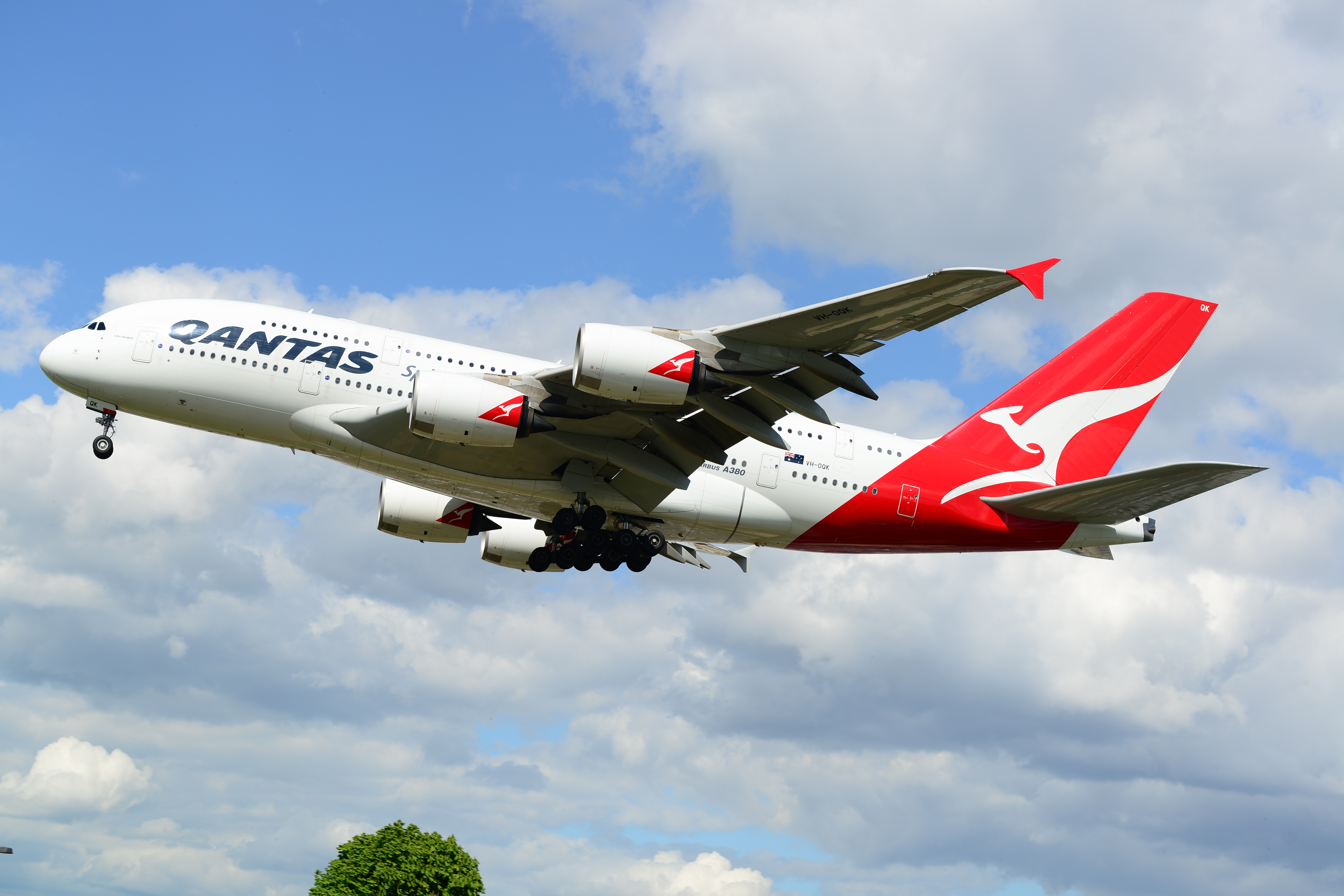
An Airbus A380 of Qantas. The A380 is the world's largest passenger airliner.

The term "jumbo jet" usually refers to the largest variants of wide-body airliners; examples include the Boeing 747 (the first wide-body and original "jumbo jet"), Airbus A380 ("superjumbo jet"), and Boeing 777-9. The phrase "jumbo jet" derives from Jumbo, a circus elephant in the 19th century.

== Wake turbulence and separation ==
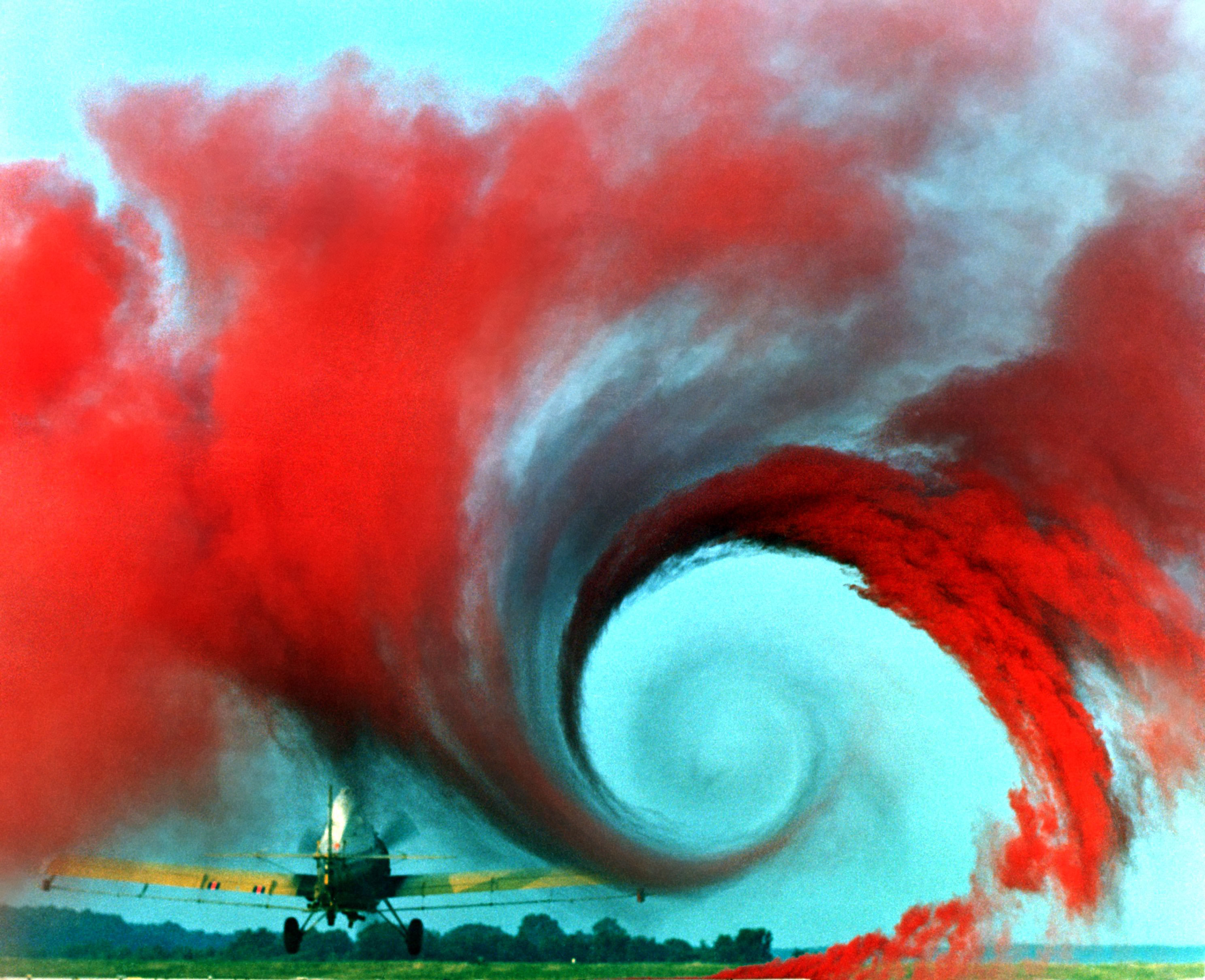
A NASA study on wingtip vortices, which illustrates wake turbulence

Aircraft are categorised by ICAO according to the wake turbulence they produce. Because wake turbulence is generally related to the weight of an aircraft, these categories are based on one of four weight categories: light, medium, heavy, and super.

Due to their weight, all current wide-body aircraft are categorised as "heavy", or in the case of the A380 in U.S. airspace, "super".

The wake-turbulence category also is used to guide the separation of aircraft. Super- and heavy-category aircraft require greater separation behind them than those in other categories. In some countries, such as the United States, it is a requirement to suffix the aircraft's call sign with the word heavy (or super) when communicating with air traffic control in certain areas.

== Special uses ==
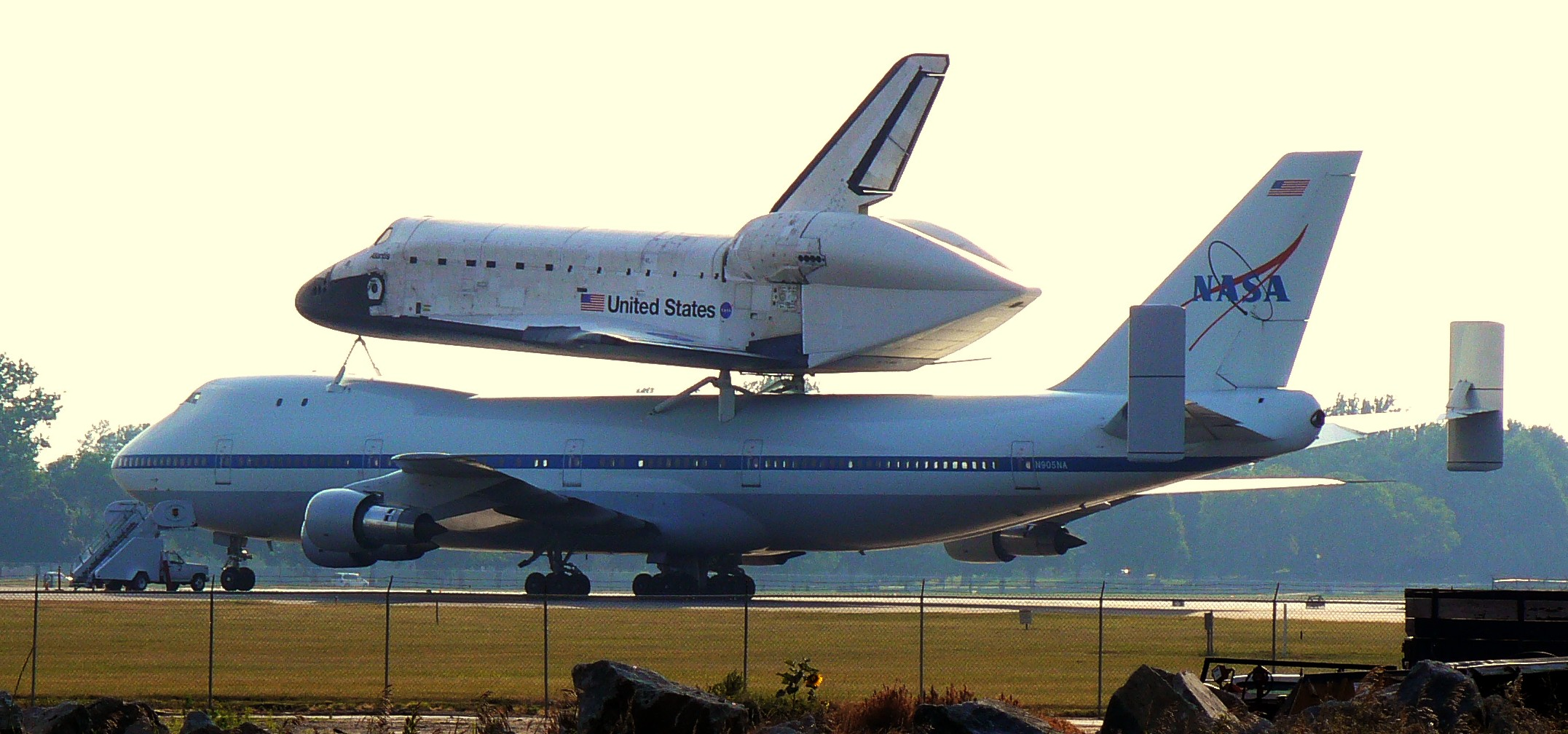
A U.S. Space Shuttle mounted on a modified Boeing 747

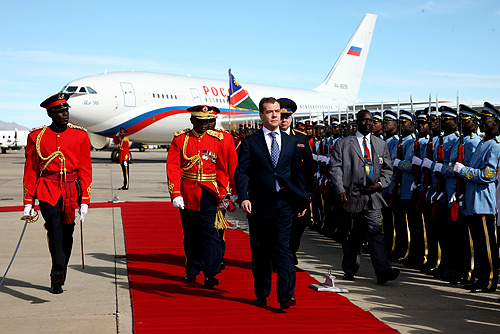
Russian presidential Il-96 used by Russian government officials

Wide-body aircraft are used in science, research, and the military. Some wide-body aircraft are used as flying command posts by the military like the Ilyushin Il-80 or the Boeing E-4, while the Boeing E-767 is used for airborne early warning and control. New military weapons are tested aboard wide-bodies, as in the laser weapons testing on the Boeing YAL-1. Other wide-body aircraft are used as flying research stations, such as the joint German–U.S. Stratospheric Observatory for Infrared Astronomy (SOFIA). Airbus A340, Airbus A380, and Boeing 747 four-engine wide-body aircraft are used to test new generations of aircraft engines in flight. A few aircraft have also been converted for aerial firefighting, such as the DC-10-based Tanker 910 and the 747-200-based Evergreen Supertanker.

Some wide-body aircraft are used as VIP transport. To transport those holding the highest offices, Canada uses the Airbus A310, while Russia uses the Ilyushin Il-96. Germany replaced its aging Airbus A340 with three Airbus A350 aircraft. Specially-modified Boeing 747-200s (Boeing VC-25s) are used to transport the President of the United States.

The category does not include similarly large military transport aircraft, such as the Antonov An-225, Lockheed C-5 Galaxy, and Boeing C-17 Globemaster III.

=== Outsize cargo ===
Some wide-body aircraft have been modified to enable the transport of oversize cargo. Examples include the Airbus Beluga, Airbus BelugaXL and Boeing Dreamlifter. Two specially modified Boeing 747s were used to transport the U.S. Space Shuttle, while the Antonov An-225 was initially built to carry the Buran shuttle.

== Comparison ==
Model	produced	MTOW (tonnes)	Length	Fuselage width	Cabin width	Economy seats across	Seat width (Note: with 2" armrests when not otherwise specified)	Number built
Boeing 767	1981–present	186.9	48.51–61.37 m (159 ft 2 in – 201 ft 4 in)	5.03 metres (16 ft 6 in)	4.72 metres (15 ft 6 in)	7: 2-3-2 (HD, 8: 2-4-2)	18" (16.4")	1357 (March 2026)
Airbus A300	1974–2007	171.7	53.61–54.08 m (175 ft 11 in – 177 ft 5 in)	5.64 m (18 ft 6 in)	5.28 m (17 ft 4 in)	8: 2-4-2 (HD, 9: 3-3-3)	17.2" (16.4")	561 (discontinued)
Airbus A310	1983–1998	164	46.66 m (153 ft 1 in)	5.64 m (18 ft 6 in)	5.28 m (17 ft 4 in)	8: 2-4-2	17.2"	255 (discontinued)
Airbus A330	1994–present	242	58.82–63.67 m (193 ft 0 in – 208 ft 11 in)	5.64 m (18 ft 6 in)	5.28 m (17 ft 4 in)	8: 2-4-2 (9: 3-3-3 on 5J and D7 and JT)	18" (16.5")	1663 (March 2026)
Airbus A340	1993–2011	380	59.40–75.36 m (194 ft 11 in – 247 ft 3 in)	5.64 m (18 ft 6 in)	5.28 m (17 ft 4 in)	8: 2-4-2 (9: 3-3-3)	17.8" (16.4")	380 (discontinued)
Boeing 787	2007–present	252.7	56.72–68.28 m (186 ft 1 in – 224 ft 0 in)	5.76 m (18 ft 11 in)	5.49 m (18 ft 0 in)	9: 3-3-3 (8: 2-4-2 on JL)	17.2"	1264 (March 2026)
Comac C929	2029- (projected)	245	63.755 m (209 ft 2.0 in)	5.92 m (19 ft 5 in)	5.61 m (18 ft 5 in)	9: 3-3-3	17.9"	-
Airbus A350	2010–present	316	66.61–73.59 m (218.5–241.4 ft)	5.96 m (235 in)	5.61 m (221 in)	9: 3-3-3 (10: 3-4-3 on BF, PL, and TX)	18" (16.5”)	710 (March 2026)
McDonnell Douglas DC-10	1971–1989	259.5	51.97 m (170.5 ft)	6.02 m (237 in)	5.69 m (224 in)	9: 2-4-3, 10: 3-4-3	18", 16.5"	446 (discontinued)
McDonnell Douglas MD-11	1990–2001	286	58.65 m (192.4 ft)	6.02 m (237 in)	5.69 m (224 in)	9: 2-5-2, 10: 3-4-3	18", 16.5"	200 (discontinued)
Lockheed L-1011	1972–1985	231.3	54.17–50.05 m (177.7–164.2 ft)	6.02 m (237 in)	5.77 m (227 in)	9: 3-4-2/2-5-2, 10: 3-4-3	17.7", 16.5"	250 (discontinued)
Ilyushin Il-86	1980–1994	206	60.21 m (197.5 ft)	6.08 m (239 in)	5.70 m (224 in)	9: 3-3-3	18"	106 (discontinued)
Ilyushin Il-96	1992-present	270	55.3–63.94 m (181.4–209.8 ft)	6.08 m (239 in)	5.70 m (224 in)	9: 3-3-3	18"	34 (2025)
Boeing 777	1993–present	351.5–365.7	63.7–76.7 m (209–252 ft)	6.19 m (244 in)	5.86–5.97 m (231–235 in)	9: 3-3-3, 10: 3-4-3	17.2"/18.5"	1786 (February 2026)
Boeing 747	1968–2023	447.7	55.85–76.25 m (183.2–250.2 ft)	6.50 m (256 in)	6.10 m (240 in) up: 3.46 m (136 in)	10: 3-4-3 (main); 6: 3-3 (upper)	17.2"/18.5"	1574 (discontinued)
Airbus A380	2005–2021	575	72.72 m (238.6 ft)	7.14 m (281 in)	6.54 m (257 in) up: 5.80 m (228 in)	10: 3-4-3 (main); 8: 2-4-2 (upper)	18" (18")	254 (discontinued)

== See also ==
- Aircraft seat map
- Competition between Airbus and Boeing
- Large aircraft
- List of large aircraft
- Middle of the market airliners
- Narrow-body aircraft
