= Table reservation =

Reserved table at a restaurant

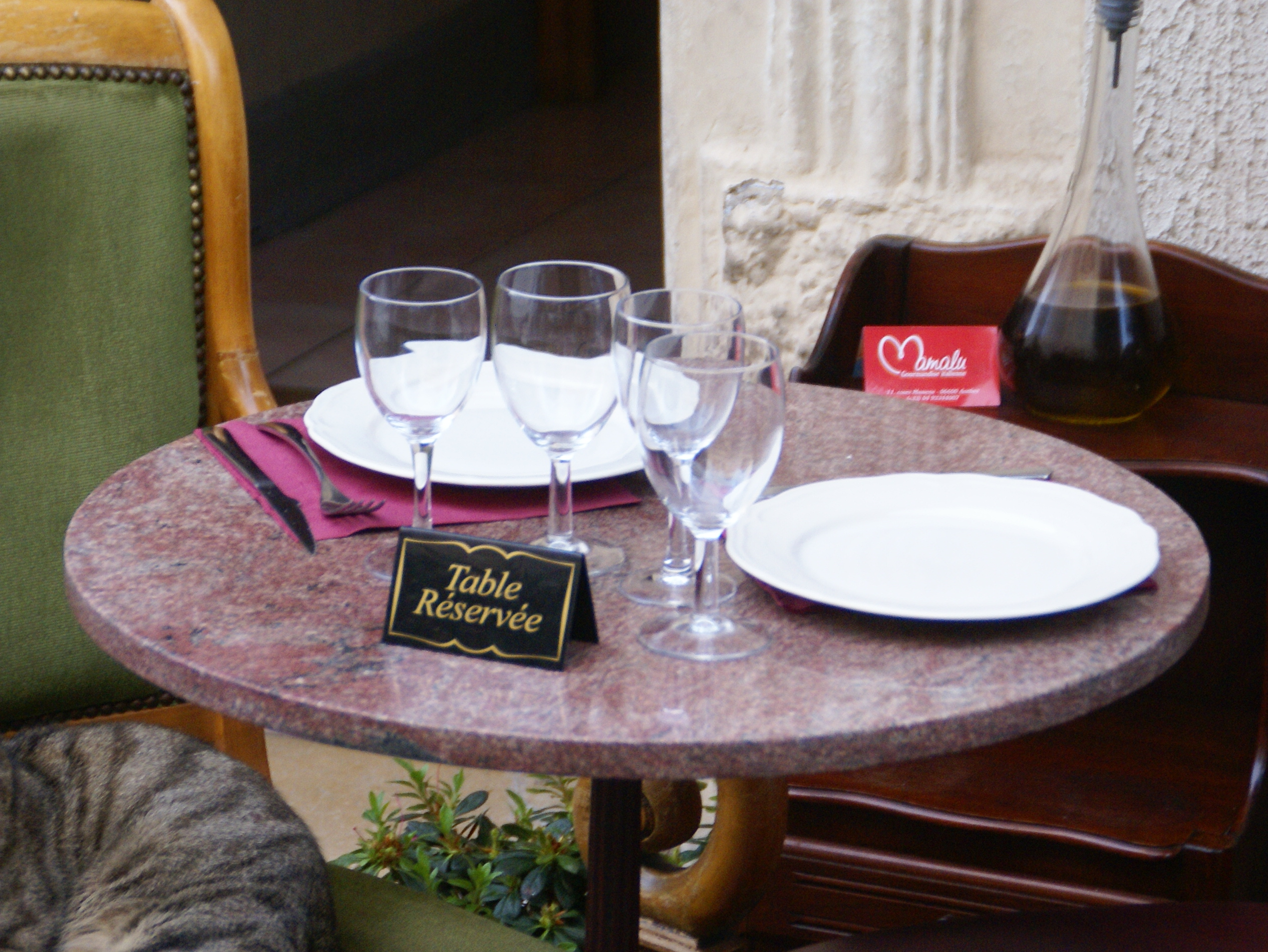
A reserved sign on a table at a restaurant in Antibes, France

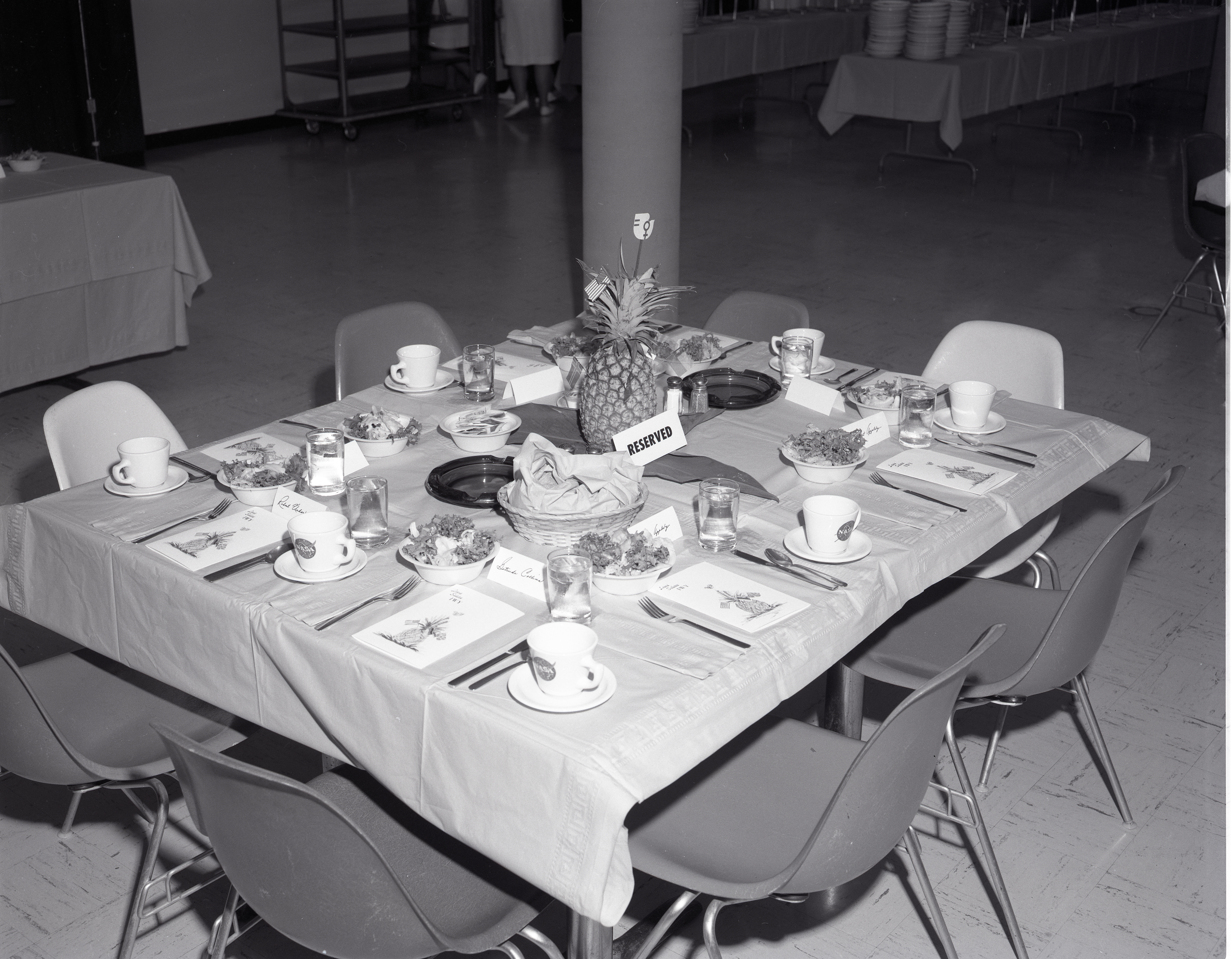
Dining table with a reserved sign in the center

A table reservation is an arrangement made in advance to have a table available at a restaurant or diner. While most restaurants in the vast majority of the world do not require a reservation, and some do not have a policy or simply any channel for making one, restaurants in large cities often require a reservation, and some may have tables booked for weeks in advance. At particularly exclusive venues, it may be impossible to make a reservation on the same day as the planned visit.

The modern reservation system evolved from the prior practice of arranging catering at a restaurant. Today, at such venues, observes Joy Smith, author of Kitchen Afloat: Galley Management and Meal Preparation (2002): "It's always smart to inquire about a restaurant's reservation policy. Some will only reserve for large parties of six or more".

In recent times, many restaurants have replaced the traditional pencil and notebook with an online reservation system, such as Bookatable, Chope or Resy. Some services allow users to put their reservations up for sale.

Reservations for later dining times may prove problematic, as a restaurant may have a backlog that will require the reservation-holders to wait beyond their stated arrival time. In addition, diners with a late reservation face a higher chance that the restaurant will run out of necessary ingredients for a particularly popular dish under the sea

Most restaurants do not charge a customer who fails to honor their reservations, and courts have tended not to impose substantial penalties on restaurants that fail to honor reservations. Nonetheless, it is generally considered polite to call and cancel a reservation once it is known one will not use it.

== Benefits ==
Nowadays it has become common for fine dining restaurants to offer table reservations to their clients. This service has become an integral part of a restaurant's operation. Even though there are still types of restaurants that prefer the modality of "first come, first served", the majority of fine dining and casual restaurants organize their operation through table reservations. As it has become part of restaurants’ service to offer reservations, clients are tending more and more towards making use of this offer, and for some people, it has become mandatory to make a table reservation before going out to a restaurant since there are also benefits for the client in this type of service.

=== Benefits to restaurants ===
A restaurant will weigh the advantages and the disadvantages of offering the service of table reservations to its customers, and even though there is a cost involved in this service, the benefits it offers will outweigh all the disadvantages one may consider.

Offering table reservations might be a tool to increase demand for certain restaurants. As clients know that there is a limited capacity of seats, they will always prefer to make a table reservation instead of arriving at the restaurant and facing a long waiting line. This tool helps the restaurant to keep a high demand of its customers on busy nights, and even better, to increase traffic on slow nights when customers make reservations because they don't know how crowded the restaurant will be.

Table reservations are also a handy tool in competitive markets since they make it possible for restaurants to “steal” some market share from their competition. This occurs when clients are not able to get a reservation at their "first choice" restaurant and they decide to go to their "second choice" restaurant, where they can get a reservation.

This service represents an important benefit for restaurants, because by guaranteeing customers a seat, they will be able to start operating at an earlier time, and serve food until a later time than average, and thus, serve more parties each day, and consequently, have a higher daily income.

The modality of table reservations helps restaurants to estimate demand more accurately, and therefore, to improve sourcing and staffing and manage costs more efficiently. By managing workflow in a better way, through reservations, the restaurant will be able to deliver a better quality of service.

=== Benefits to clients ===
A client will always benefit from being able to make a table reservation at the restaurant to which he wishes to go. Nowadays, the majority of people prefer to go out knowing that they have a reservation, instead of incurring the risk of not getting a table at the desired place.

A clear benefit of making a table reservation for a client is the security that they will experience when going out to a restaurant.; i.e., making a reservation will guarantee the client that he will receive his table at the time and place he has planned.

It is an advantage for the customer to know in advance that he will not have to go through the trouble of waiting until a table is available, or being put on a waiting list, or in the worst case, needing to find another place to eat, because the one chosen won't be able to serve him.

Another important benefit of making a reservation in the desired restaurant is the better quality of service one will receive. As the restaurant knows at what time and with how many people the customer will arrive, a comfortable table with enough seats and space will be reserved, and the restaurant's staff will be prepared to serve the arriving group.

=== Benefits of an online reservation system ===
Traditionally, restaurants have managed their reservation systems with a reservation book, which means they received the reservations via telephone calls and wrote them down in a book. Nowadays, as a consequence of the massive use of the Internet and its benefits, experts have seen the opportunity and great added value of creating online reservation systems, and already many restaurants have replaced the traditional format with these new systems.

An important advantage of online reservation systems is the flexibility they offer when making a reservation. When reservations are managed traditionally, patrons will only be able to call a restaurant to make a reservation during operational hours. On the contrary, when reservations are managed through an online reservation system, customers will be able to make their reservations at any time and from any place they choose. In general, patrons will have a better experience when making an online reservation, because it will be a quick process, the service will be available 24/7, and the system will provide all the necessary information to make the desired reservation with tranquility.

Restaurants will experience various benefits when using an online reservation system. Some of these benefits translate into a decline in incoming phone calls, better control of the capacity of the restaurant and the number of reservations one will be able to accept, as well as a number of statistics and reports that will help to analyze the business.

These benefits arise from a wide range of management tools provided by online reservation systems, like operational reports, floor management software, customer reservation histories, and customer databases that include customer data and preferences, and grow with each new table booking. Restaurants will also be able to track cancellations, and manage walk-in and waitlists in a better way, eliminate overbookings, and create target email and postal mailings with the information from the customer database. Some online reservation systems include integrated email marketing tools.

== Disadvantages ==
Reservations can cause logistical issues for venues. For example, paper-and-pencil reservations can lead to overbooking if performed incorrectly. Although point-of-sale (POS) systems and online systems provide solutions to this issue, overbooking can still occur for reasons such as miscommunication between multiple staff members. Additionally, if a venue is constantly fully booked, it may deter new customers from trying to book a reservation in the future.

Guests who create reservations but neither cancel nor show up pose a significant financial risk to restaurants, leading to overstaffing and loss of business from potential paying customers.

== See also ==
- List of restaurant terminology
