= 2025 National Society of Film Critics Awards =

Awards for films from 2025

60th NSFC Awards
- Date: January 3, 2026

Highlights
- Best Picture: One Battle After Another

The 60th National Society of Film Critics Awards, given on January 3, 2026, honored the best in film for 2025.

Paul Thomas Anderson's action thriller film One Battle After Another won the most awards with four, including Best Picture and Best Director. One Battle After Another became the fourth film in history to sweep the quartet of Best Picture prizes from the Los Angeles Film Critics Association, the National Board of Review, the New York Film Critics Circle, and, now, the National Society of Film Critics, joining Schindler's List (1993), L.A. Confidential (1997) and The Social Network (2010).

== Winners ==
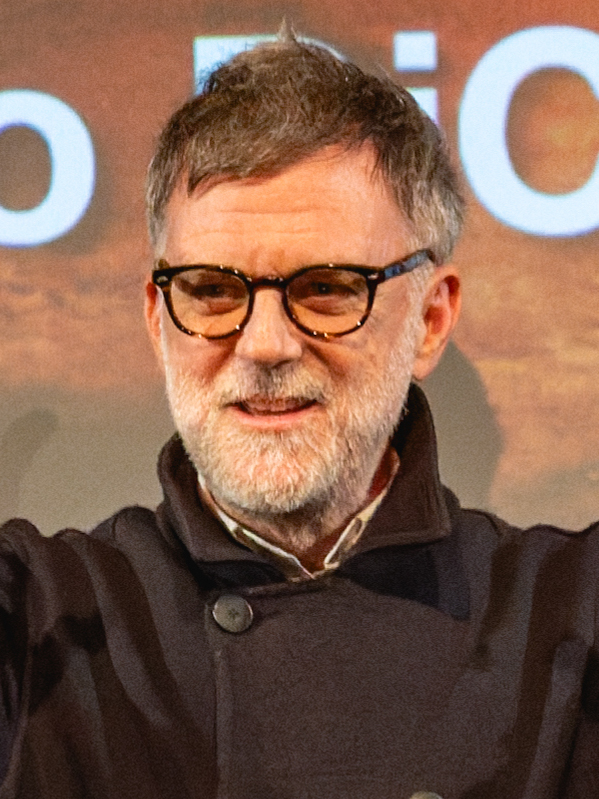
Paul Thomas Anderson, Best Director winner

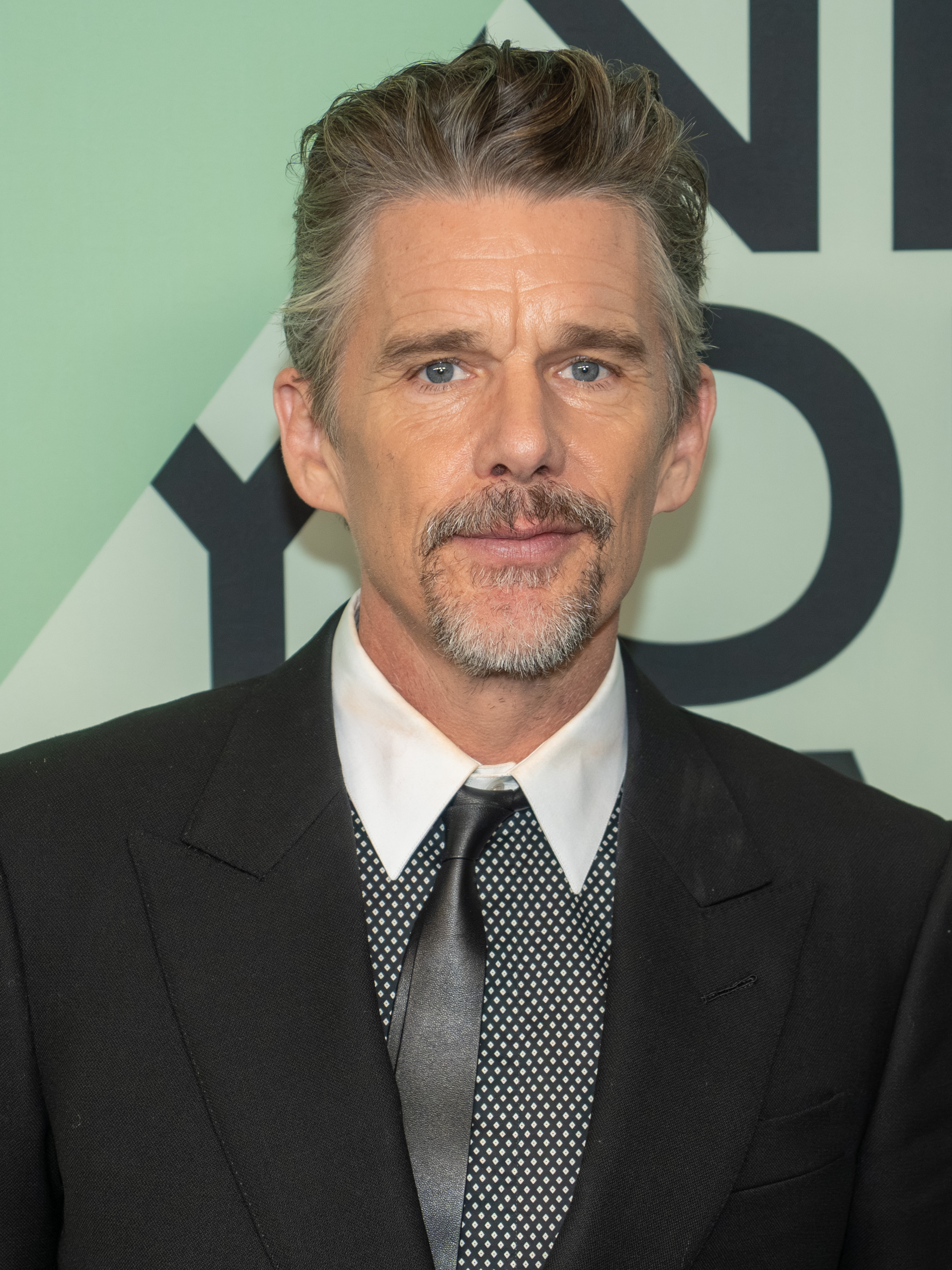
Ethan Hawke, Best Actor winner

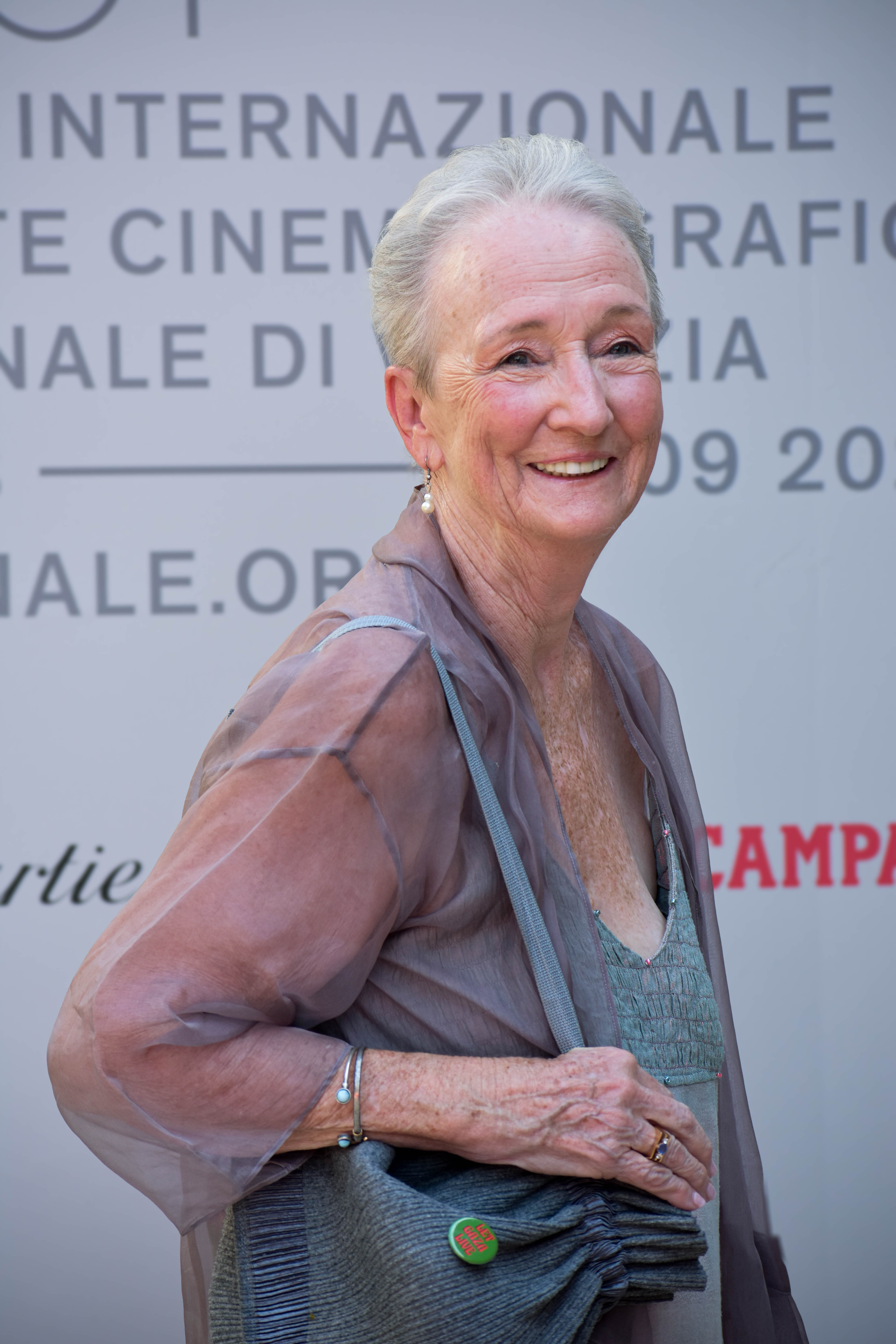
Kathleen Chalfant, Best Actress winner

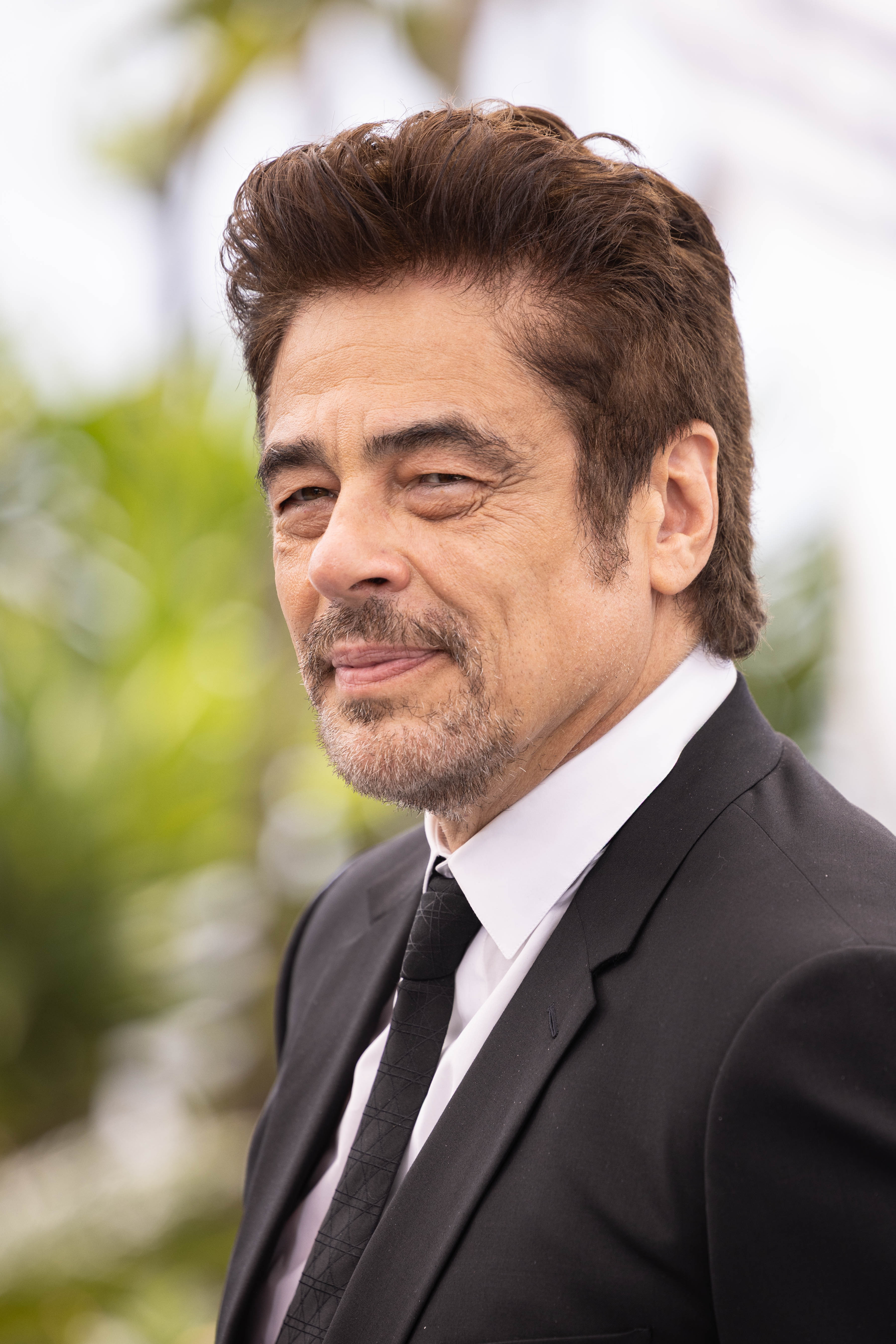
Benicio del Toro, Best Supporting Actor winner

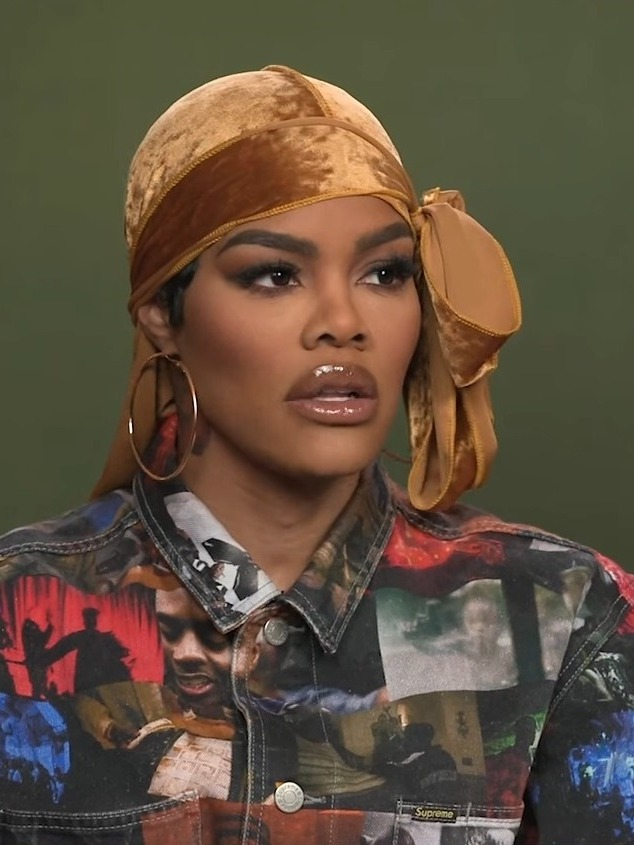
Teyana Taylor, Best Supporting Actress winner

Winners are listed in boldface along with the runner-up positions and counts from the final round:

=== Best Picture ===
1. **One Battle After Another** (57)
2. Sinners (29)
3. The Secret Agent (27)

=== Best Director ===
1. **Paul Thomas Anderson – One Battle After Another** (54)
2. Jafar Panahi – It Was Just an Accident (48)
3. Richard Linklater – Blue Moon / Nouvelle Vague (39)

=== Best Actor ===
1. **Ethan Hawke – Blue Moon** (57)
2. Wagner Moura – The Secret Agent (43)
3. Michael B. Jordan – Sinners (36)

=== Best Actress ===
1. **Kathleen Chalfant – Familiar Touch** (45)
2. Rose Byrne – If I Had Legs I'd Kick You (39)
3. Renate Reinsve – Sentimental Value (37)

=== Best Supporting Actor ===
1. **Benicio del Toro – One Battle After Another** (54)
2. Delroy Lindo – Sinners (37)
3. Stellan Skarsgård – Sentimental Value (30)

=== Best Supporting Actress ===
1. **Teyana Taylor – One Battle After Another** (56)
2. Inga Ibsdotter Lilleaas – Sentimental Value (47)
3. Wunmi Mosaku – Sinners (41)

=== Best Screenplay ===
1. **Jafar Panahi – It Was Just an Accident** (53)
2. Robert Kaplow – Blue Moon (50)
3. Kleber Mendonça Filho – The Secret Agent (40)

=== Best Cinematography ===
1. **Autumn Durald Arkapaw – Sinners** (50)
2. Adolpho Veloso – Train Dreams (36)
3. Michael Bauman – One Battle After Another (29)

=== Best Film Not in the English Language ===
1. **The Secret Agent** (58)
2. It Was Just an Accident (57)
3. Sentimental Value (38)

=== Best Non-Fiction Film ===
1. **My Undesirable Friends: Part I — Last Air in Moscow** (56)
2. The Perfect Neighbor (22)
3. Orwell: 2+2=5 (18)

=== Best Experimental Film ===
- Morning Circle (Basma al-Sharif)

=== Film Heritage Award ===
- Cinema Tropical, "for its tireless efforts to distribute, program and promote Latin American cinema in the U.S."
- The Film Desk, "for releasing key movies from all over the world, in 35 mm prints and on home video, and publishing books that have enriched the public's knowledge of cinema."
- Ken and Flo Jacobs, "an irreplaceable, gravitational center of the American avant-garde, with a shared artistic sensibility that helped define experimental cinema."

=== Special Award for a Film Awaiting U.S. Distribution ===
- Landmarks (Lucrecia Martel)
