= Chicago Film Critics Association Awards 2025 =

Annual film critics awards

38th Chicago Film Critics Association Awards
- Date: December 11, 2025
- Site: Chicago, Illinois, U.S.

Highlights
- Best Picture: One Battle After Another
- Most awards: One Battle After Another (9)
- Most nominations: One Battle After Another / Sinners (12)

The 38th Chicago Film Critics Association Awards were presented to recognize the best in film of 2025. The nominations were announced on December 9, 2025. One Battle After Another and Sinners received the most nominations with a record twelve each, followed by Marty Supreme with seven; Frankenstein and Train Dreams each earned five nominations.

Additionally, Eva Victor received the most nominations for a single individual this year (Best Original Screenplay, Most Promising Performer, and the Milos Stehlik Breakthrough Filmmaker Award) for Sorry, Baby.

The winners were announced on December 11, 2025. Winning nine awards, One Battle After Another broke the record for the most wins by any film, surpassing the previous record seven wins by The Power of the Dog in 2021. The film was named Best Film, also earning Best Director (Paul Thomas Anderson), Best Supporting Actor (Benicio del Toro), Best Supporting Actress (Teyana Taylor), Best Adapted Screenplay (Anderson), Most Promising Performer (Chase Infiniti) and more; Frankenstein and It Was Just an Accident followed with two wins apiece.

== Winners and nominees ==
The winners and nominees for the 38th Chicago Film Critics Association Awards are as follows:

=== Awards ===
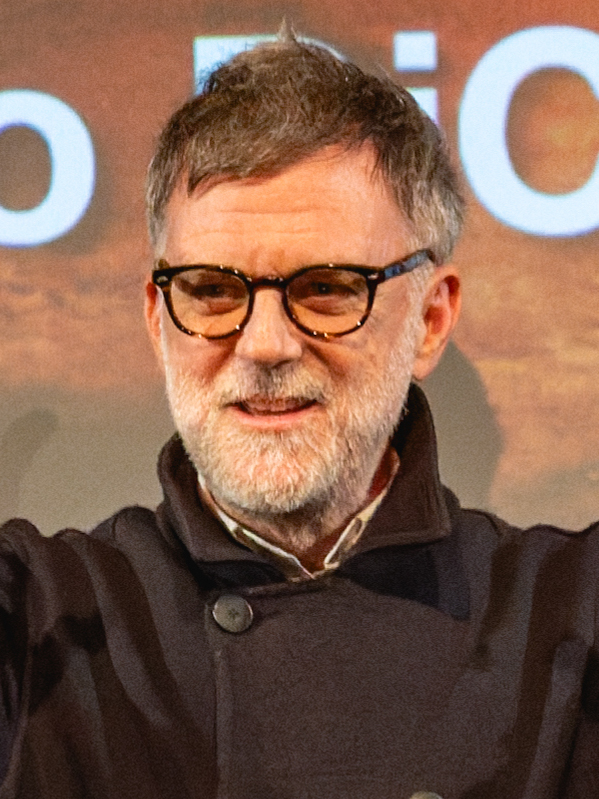
Paul Thomas Anderson, Best Director and Best Adapted Screenplay winner

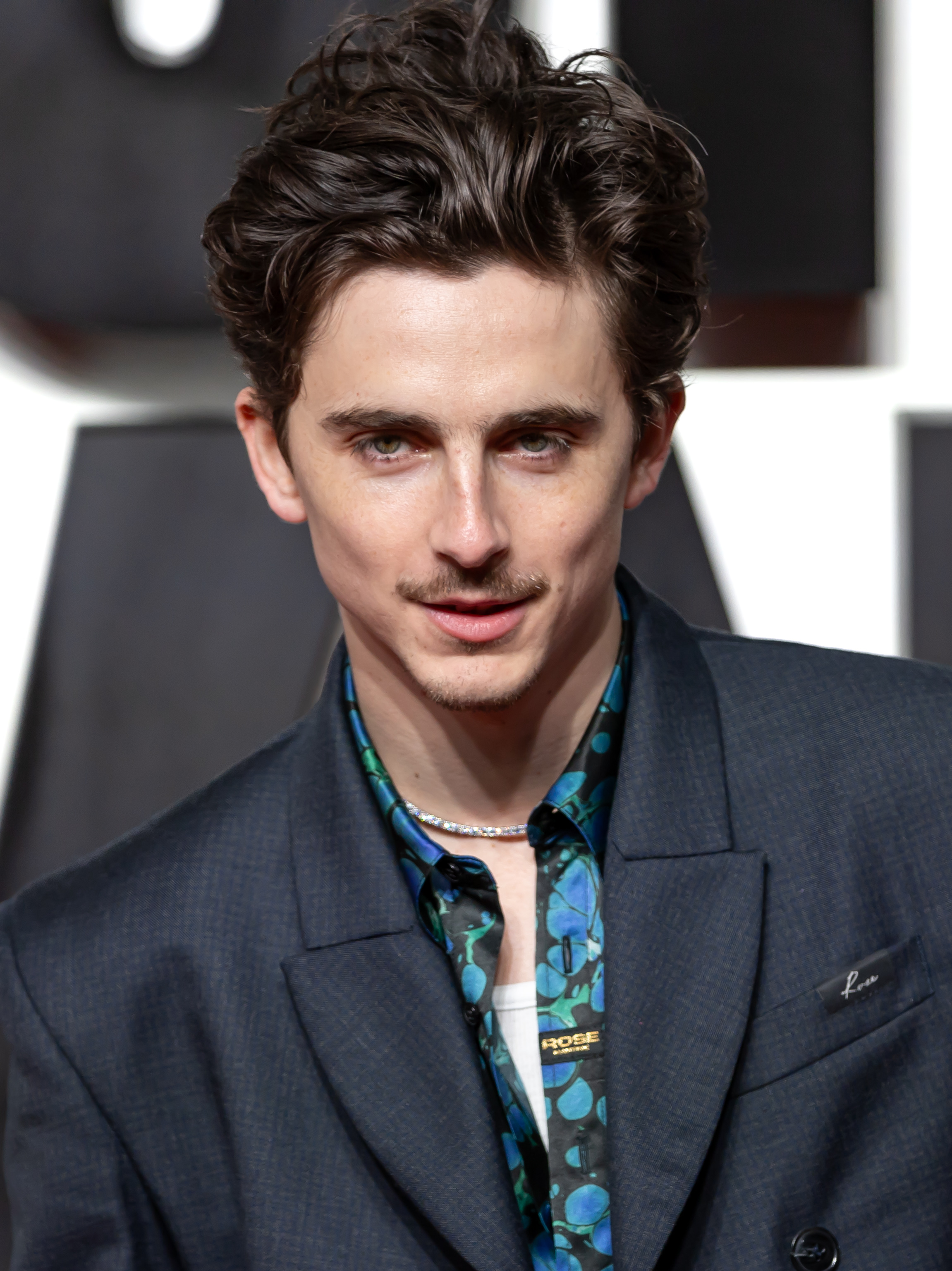
Timothée Chalamet, Best Actor winner

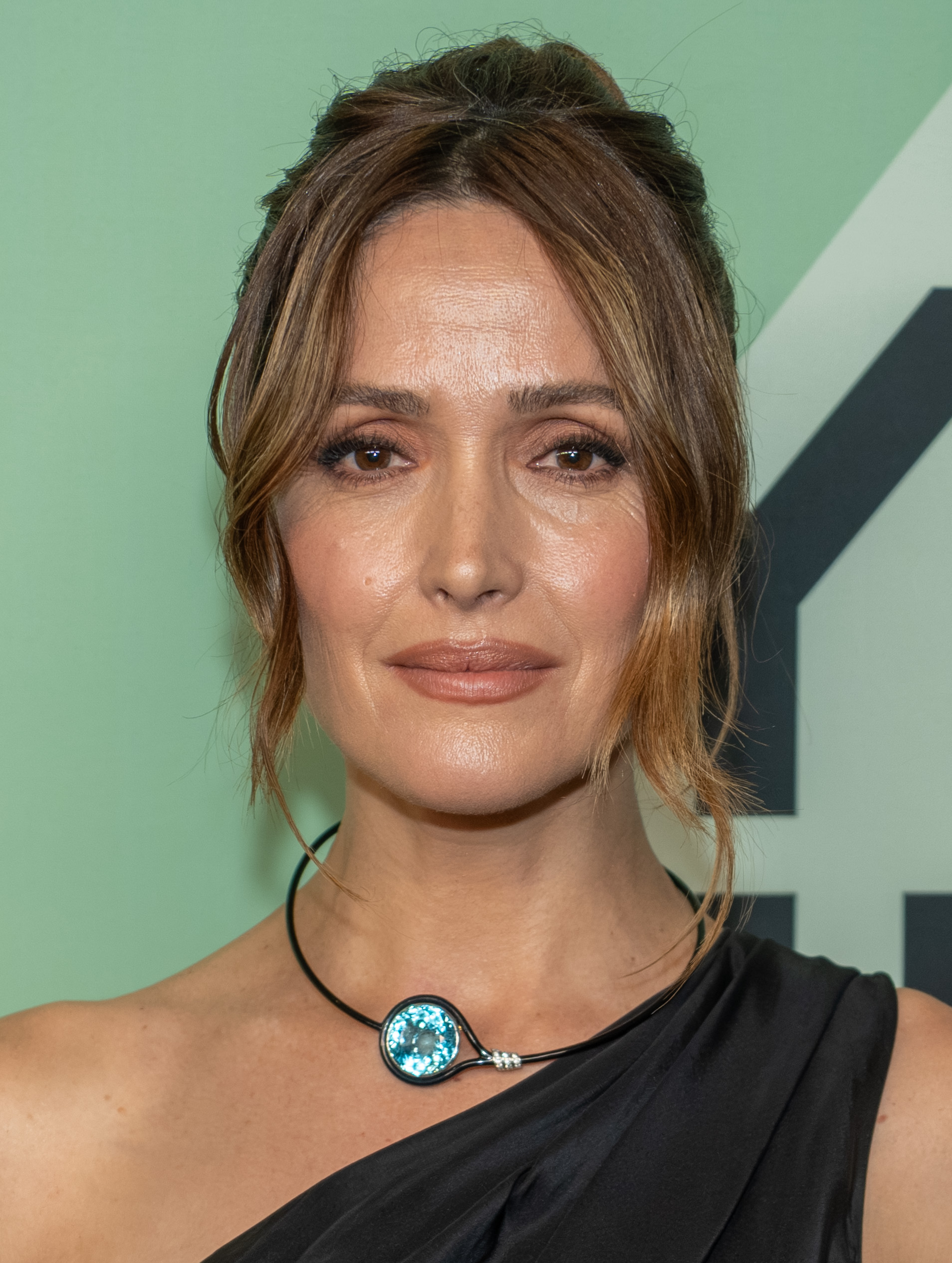
Rose Byrne, Best Actress winner

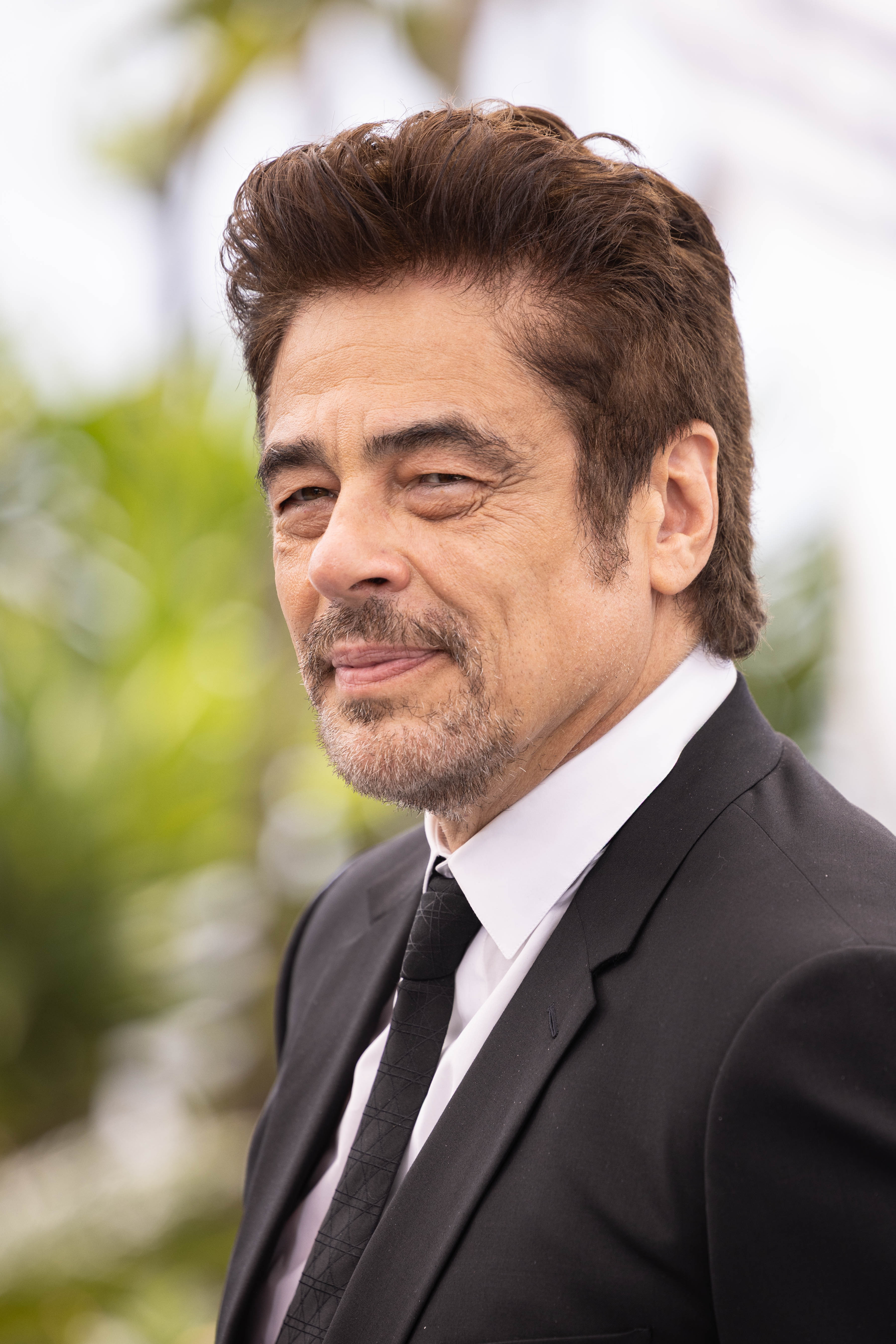
Benicio del Toro, Best Supporting Actor winner

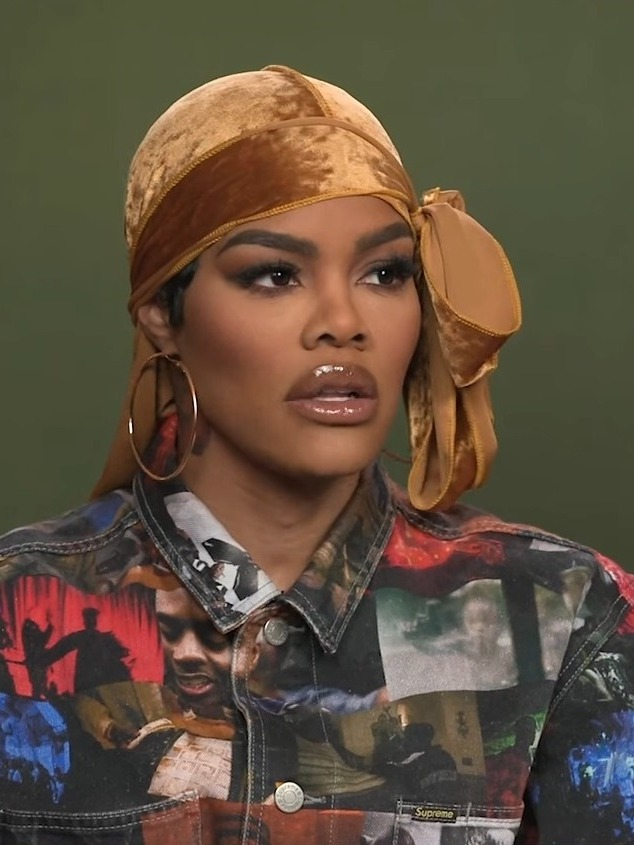
Teyana Taylor, Best Supporting Actress winner

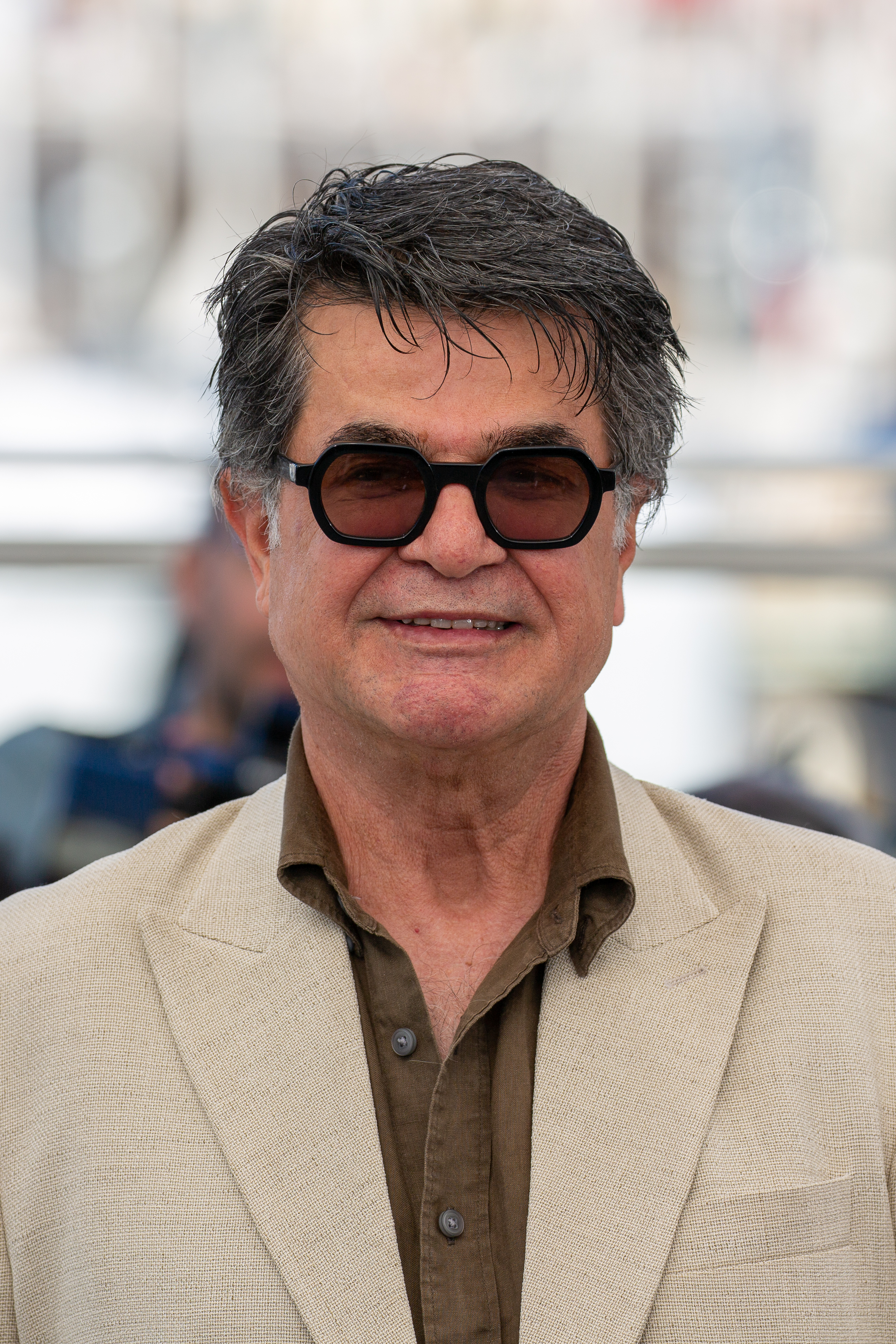
Jafar Panahi, Best Original Screenplay winner

Best Film	Best Director
One Battle After Another; It Was Just an Accident; Marty Supreme; Sinners; Train Dreams	Paul Thomas Anderson – One Battle After Another; Ryan Coogler – Sinners; Mona Fastvold – The Testament of Ann Lee; Jafar Panahi – It Was Just an Accident; Josh Safdie – Marty Supreme
Best Actor	Best Actress
Timothée Chalamet – Marty Supreme as Marty Mauser; Leonardo DiCaprio – One Battle After Another as Bob Ferguson; Joel Edgerton – Train Dreams as Robert Grainier; Ethan Hawke – Blue Moon as Lorenz Hart; Michael B. Jordan – Sinners as Elijah "Smoke" Moore / Elias "Stack" Moore; Wagner Moura – The Secret Agent as Marcelo Alves / Armando Solimões / Fernando Solimões	Rose Byrne – If I Had Legs I'd Kick You as Linda; Jessie Buckley – Hamnet as Agnes Shakespeare; Jennifer Lawrence – Die My Love as Grace; Amanda Seyfried – The Testament of Ann Lee as Ann Lee; Tessa Thompson – Hedda as Hedda Gabler
Best Supporting Actor	Best Supporting Actress
Benicio del Toro – One Battle After Another as Sensei Sergio St. Carlos; Jacob Elordi – Frankenstein as The Creature; Delroy Lindo – Sinners as Delta Slim; Sean Penn – One Battle After Another as Col. Steven J. Lockjaw; Stellan Skarsgård – Sentimental Value as Gustov Borg	Teyana Taylor – One Battle After Another as Perfidia Beverly Hills; Odessa A'zion – Marty Supreme as Rachel Mizler; Nina Hoss – Hedda as Eileen Lovborg; Inga Ibsdotter Lilleaas – Sentimental Value as Agnes Borg Pettersen; Amy Madigan – Weapons as Gladys; Wunmi Mosaku – Sinners as Annie
Best Original Screenplay	Best Adapted Screenplay
It Was Just an Accident – Jafar Panahi; Blue Moon – Robert Kaplow; Marty Supreme – Ronald Bronstein and Josh Safdie; Sinners – Ryan Coogler; Sorry, Baby – Eva Victor	One Battle After Another – Paul Thomas Anderson; Hamnet – Chloé Zhao and Maggie O'Farrell; No Other Choice – Park Chan-wook, Lee Kyoung-mi, Don McKellar, and Lee Ja-hye; Train Dreams – Clint Bentley and Greg Kwedar; Wake Up Dead Man – Rian Johnson
Best Animated Film	Best Documentary Film
KPop Demon Hunters; Arco; Boys Go to Jupiter; Little Amélie or the Character of Rain; Zootopia 2	The Perfect Neighbor; Cover-Up; My Undesirable Friends: Part I — Last Air in Moscow; Predators; Put Your Soul on Your Hand and Walk
Best Foreign Language Film
It Was Just an Accident (Iran); No Other Choice (South Korea); The Secret Agent (Brazil); Sentimental Value (Norway); Sirāt (Spain)
Best Cinematography	Best Editing
One Battle After Another – Michael Bauman; Frankenstein – Dan Laustsen; Hamnet – Łukasz Żal; Sinners – Autumn Durald Arkapaw; Train Dreams – Adolpho Veloso	One Battle After Another – Andy Jurgensen; 28 Years Later – Jon Harris; F1 – Stephen Mirrione and Patrick J. Smith; Marty Supreme – Ronald Bronstein and Josh Safdie; No Other Choice – Kim Sang-bum and Kim Ho-bin
Best Costume Design	Best Original Score
Frankenstein – Kate Hawley; Hedda – Lindsay Pugh; Sinners – Ruth E. Carter; The Testament of Ann Lee – Malgorzata Karpiuk; Wicked: For Good – Paul Tazewell	One Battle After Another – Jonny Greenwood; The Mastermind – Rob Mazurek; Sinners – Ludwig Göransson; The Testament of Ann Lee – Daniel Blumberg; Train Dreams – Bryce Dessner
Best Art Direction / Production Design	Best Use of Visual Effects
Frankenstein; Marty Supreme; One Battle After Another; The Phoenician Scheme; Sinners	Sinners; Avatar: Fire and Ash; Frankenstein; Mickey 17; Mission: Impossible – The Final Reckoning
Milos Stehlik Breakthrough Filmmaker Award	Most Promising Performer
Eva Victor – Sorry, Baby; Mary Bronstein – If I Had Legs I'd Kick You; Sarah Friedland – Familiar Touch; Carson Lund – Eephus; James Sweeney – Twinless	Chase Infiniti – One Battle After Another; Miles Caton – Sinners; Abou Sangaré – Souleymane's Story; Tonatiuh – Kiss of the Spider Woman; Eva Victor – Sorry, Baby

== Awards breakdown ==
The following films received multiple nominations:

Nominations	Film
12	One Battle After Another
12	Sinners
7	Marty Supreme
5	Frankenstein
5	Train Dreams
4	It Was Just an Accident
4	The Testament of Ann Lee
3	Hamnet
3	Hedda
3	No Other Choice
3	Sentimental Value
3	Sorry, Baby
2	Blue Moon
2	If I Had Legs I'd Kick You
2	The Secret Agent

The following films received multiple wins:

Wins	Film
9	One Battle After Another
2	Frankenstein
2	It Was Just an Accident
