= São Paulo International Film Festival =

Annual film festival held in São Paulo, Brazil

Coordinates: 23°33′S 46°38′W

- Official poster of the 49th edition
- Location: São Paulo, Brazil
- Founded: 1977
- Most recent: 2025
- No. of films: 374 in 2025
- Festival date: Opening: 16 October 2025; Closing: 30 October 2025
- Language: International
- Website: http://www.mostra.org

Current: 49th
- 50th 48th

The São Paulo International Film Festival (Portuguese: Mostra Internacional de Cinema de São Paulo), also known internationally as Mostra, is an annual film festival held in the city of São Paulo, Brazil. A non-profit event, the festival is organized by ABMIC (Associação Brasileira Mostra Internacional de Cinema). The state and city of São Paulo have established October as the festival's official month.

The 48th edition of the festival was held from 17 to 30 October 2024. Familiar Touch by Sarah Friedland won the Jury Prize for best film at the festival. The 49th edition of the festival was held from 16 to 30 October 2025. In this edition 374 films from 80 countries were screened throughout São Paulo.

== History ==
The festival was created in 1977 when film critic Leon Cakoff decided to celebrate the 30th anniversary of the São Paulo Museum of Art (MASP). The head of the museum's film department, Cakoff had already organized successful screenings of rare foreign films during the 1970s. These pre-festival screenings had a large audience turnout, including films that came without Portuguese subtitles and sometimes with no translation at all, proving the strength of the city's cultural demand.

The 1st São Paulo International Film Festival included 16 feature films and 7 shorts, representing 17 countries in total. Consisting of 40 screenings at the MASP's Grand Auditorium, the first edition inaugurated the Audience Prize, with members of the audience voting for the best picture, a ritual that has been followed ever since. The winner of the first Audience Prize was Hector Babenco's Lucio Flavio (1977), a Brazilian production. The Jornal do Brasil news publication noted that the festival was the only place in the country where people had the right to vote.

=== Censorship ===
Brazil was under military dictatorship at the time, causing a lot of difficulties with the censors during the festival's first seven years while it was still held at the MASP. Films often had to be screened to a censorship committee before being shown to the public and transportation difficulties sometimes forced the prints to arrive in Brazil inside diplomatic luggage with the aid of embassies and consulates. After leaving the museum in 1984, the festival stood up to the censors and began a legal battle for the right to screen the films directly to the public, with no prior censorship interference.

The 8th edition of the festival was marked by the strongest clash against the government. The festival won the appeal in 1984, the last year of the dictatorship, and it began seemingly free from the censors. However, the event was suspended in the middle of the first week after a screening of Wim Wenders' The State of Things (1982). The interruption, which received large international coverage, lasted for four days, enough time for the Ministry of Justice's censorship board to watch all of the films.

The festival has been free of government censorship since 1985 thanks to a ministerial order by request of the organizers of the event. The decision extended itself throughout the entire nation, including every other festival that was previously subjected to censorship. The court victory caused the 9th edition of the festival, which took place from October 15 to 31 in 1985, to screen all of the films without any government interference.

=== 46th Awards ===
The 46th edition of the festival was held from 20 October to 2 November 2022. 223 films from 60 countries, categorized in three segments: International Perspective, New Directors Competition, and Mostra Brasil were presented in the festival. Aftersun by Charlotte Wells won the Jury Prize for best film in the festival.

== Impact ==
"The story of the São Paulo International Film Festival is a tale of a constant battle against censorship, arbitrary laws, and cultural neglect. It's finally a fight for the creation and the preservation of collective memory."

— Walter Salles, director of Central Station and The Motorcycle Diaries.

In its 39-year-history, the festival grew from being held exclusively inside the MASP museum to a large-scale event throughout the city of São Paulo. Today, Mostra screens more than 300 films a year. It has received recognition as the main gateway in Brazil to world cinema. Brazilian director Fernando Meirelles has claimed that Brazilian audiences would only be familiar with American and some European productions if it weren't for the festival's efforts. Filmmaker Laís Bodanzky noted the importance of the festival in influencing an entire generation of Brazilian filmmakers who faithfully attended the event in the 80s and 90s, all of them baptizing themselves as "children of the Mostra."

The festival has had the presence of multiple Brazilian filmmakers as guests. Notable international guests since 1977 include Dennis Hopper, Pedro Almodóvar, Park Chan-wook, Miguel Gomes, Victoria Abril, Jane Birkin, Guy Maddin, Abbas Kiarostami, Claudia Cardinale, Amos Gitai, Les Blank, Quentin Tarantino, Maria de Medeiros, Wim Wenders, Alan Parker, Manoel de Oliveira, Christian Berger, Kiju Yoshida, Atom Egoyan, Danis Tanovic, Satyajit Ray, Eizo Sugawa, Theo Angelopoulos, Marisa Paredes, Rossy de Palma, Geraldine Chaplin and Jonas Mekas.

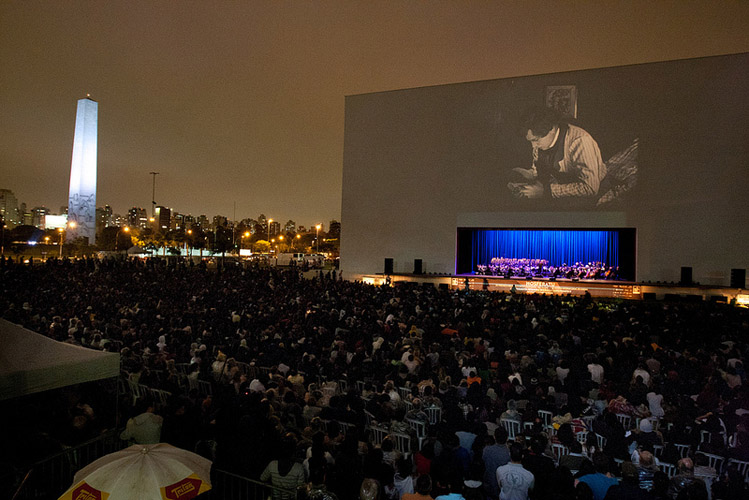
Fifteen thousand people attend an outdoor screening of Nosferatu during the 36th edition of the festival.

The festival produced the short film Welcome Back, Abbas in 1999. Directed by festival directors Leon Cakoff and Renata de Almeida, the film followed filmmaker Abbas Kiarostami during one of his visits to the city of São Paulo. Mostra has also produced anthology films, notably Welcome to São Paulo (2004) and Invisible World (2011), featuring collective short films not only by Leon and Renata, but also by directors from around the world who were invited to film in city. The list of international filmmakers (including Brazilian directors) consisted of Wolfgang Becker, Maria de Medeiros, Hanna Elias, Amos Gitai, Mika Kaurismäki, Jim McBride, Phillip Noyce, Ming-liang Tsai, Andrea Vecchiato, Caetano Veloso, Yoshishige Yoshida, Theo Angelopoulos, Gian Vittorio Baldi, Marcho Bechis, Laís Bodanzky, Beto Brant, Manoel de Oliveira, Atom Egoyan, Guy Maddin, Jerzy Stuhr, and Wim Wenders.

Leon Cakoff (the founder, organizer, and director of the event) died in 2011, shortly before the 35th edition. His widow Renata de Almeida, who produced the festival with him, became Mostra's director. The 38th edition of the São Paulo International Film Festival in 2014 featured retrospectives dedicated to Spanish filmmaker Pedro Almodóvar and the French distribution company MK2 founded by Marin Karmitz. The overall selection included over 330 titles.
