= Lion of the Future =

Venice Film Festival award

- 2026 recipient: Bernard Auguste Kouemo Yanghu
- Awarded for: Best first feature film
- Country: Italy
- Presented by: Venice Film Festival
- First award: 1999
- Currently held by: House of the Wind by Bernard Auguste Kouemo Yanghu (2026)

The Lion of the Future, also known as Luigi De Laurentiis Award for a Debut Film, is an official award of the Venice Film Festival. Inspired by Cannes' Caméra d'Or, it is awarded to the best first feature film work presented in any section of the festival.

Cameroonian filmmaker Bernard Auguste Kouemo Yanghu was the most recent winner for House of the Wind (2026), at the 83rd Venice International Film Festival.

== History ==
As of 2026, the winner receives a cash prize of $100,000 USD, which is divided equally between the director and the producer.

Among its winners are: Mahamat-Saleh Haroun, Abdellatif Kechiche, Andrey Zvyagintsev, Brady Corbet, Xavier Legrand, and Alice Diop.

== Winners ==
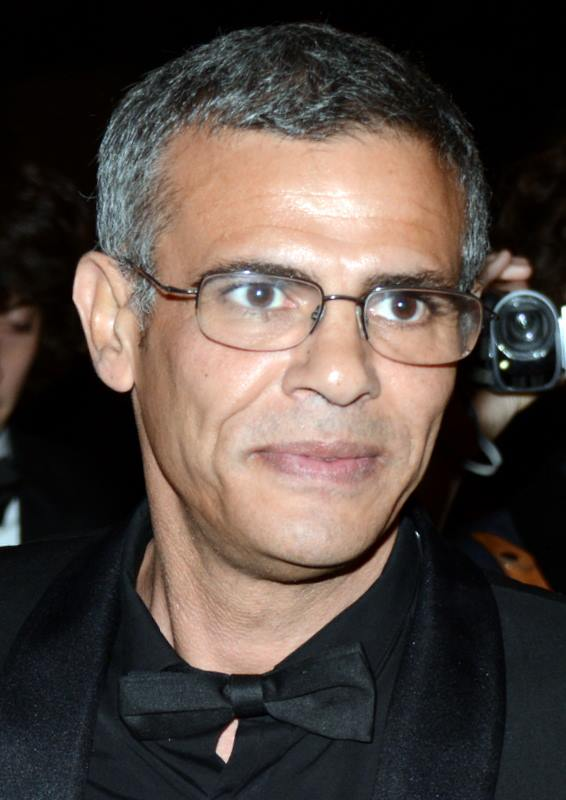
Abdellatif Kechiche won for Poetical Refugee (2000)

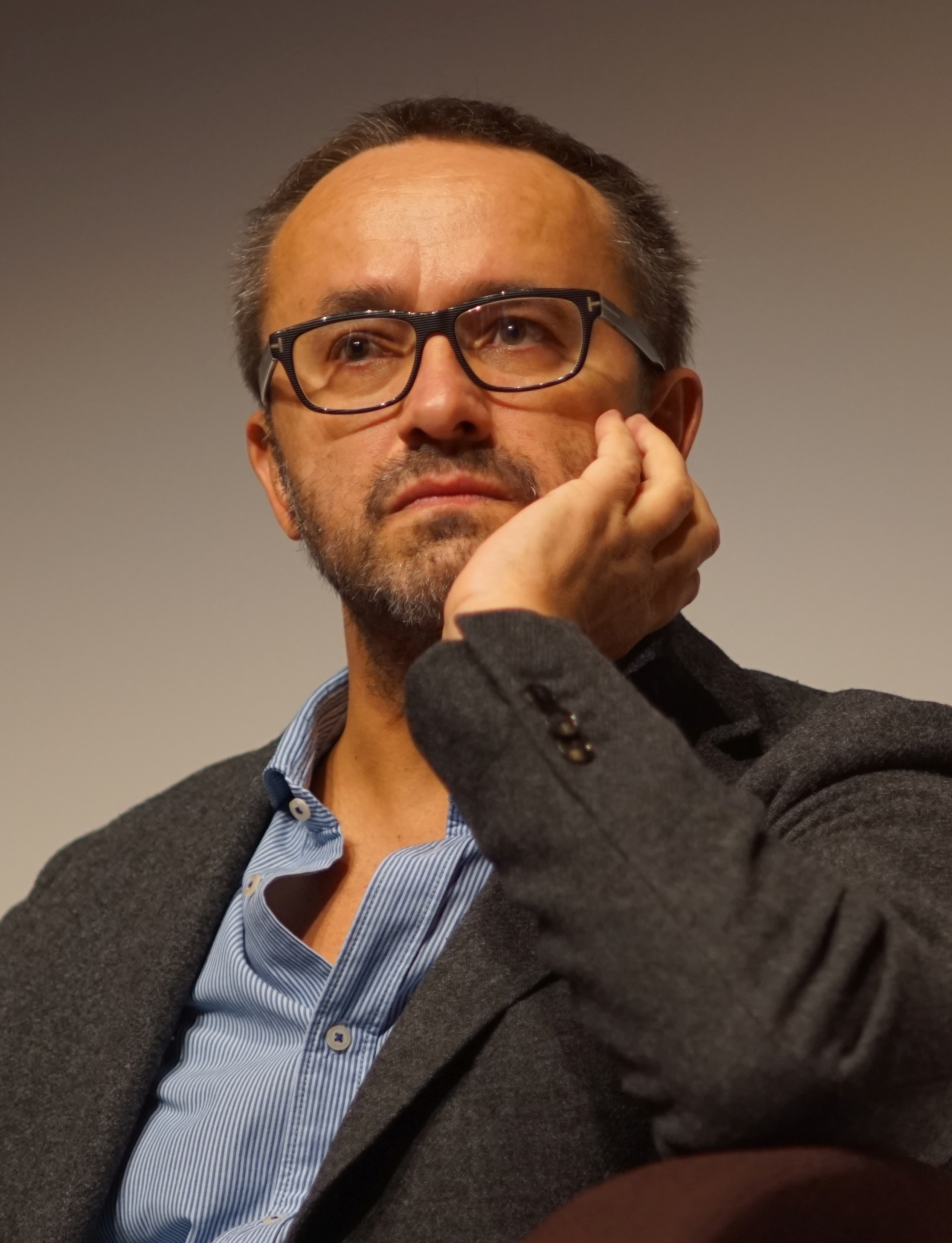
Andrey Zvyagintsev won for The Return (2003)

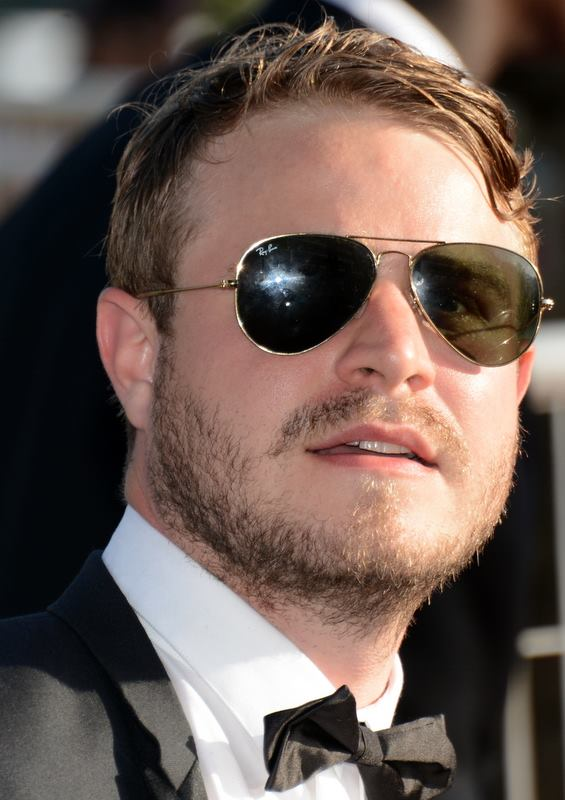
Brady Corbet won for The Childhood of a Leader (2015)

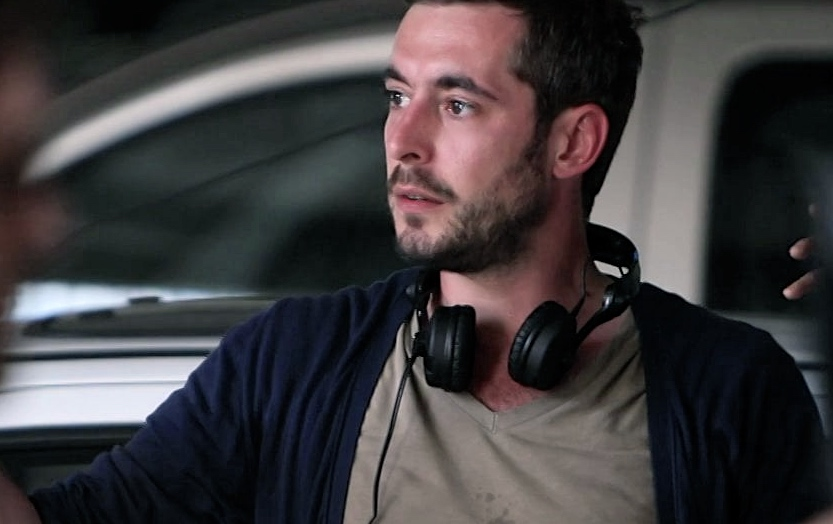
Xavier Legrand won for Custody in 2017

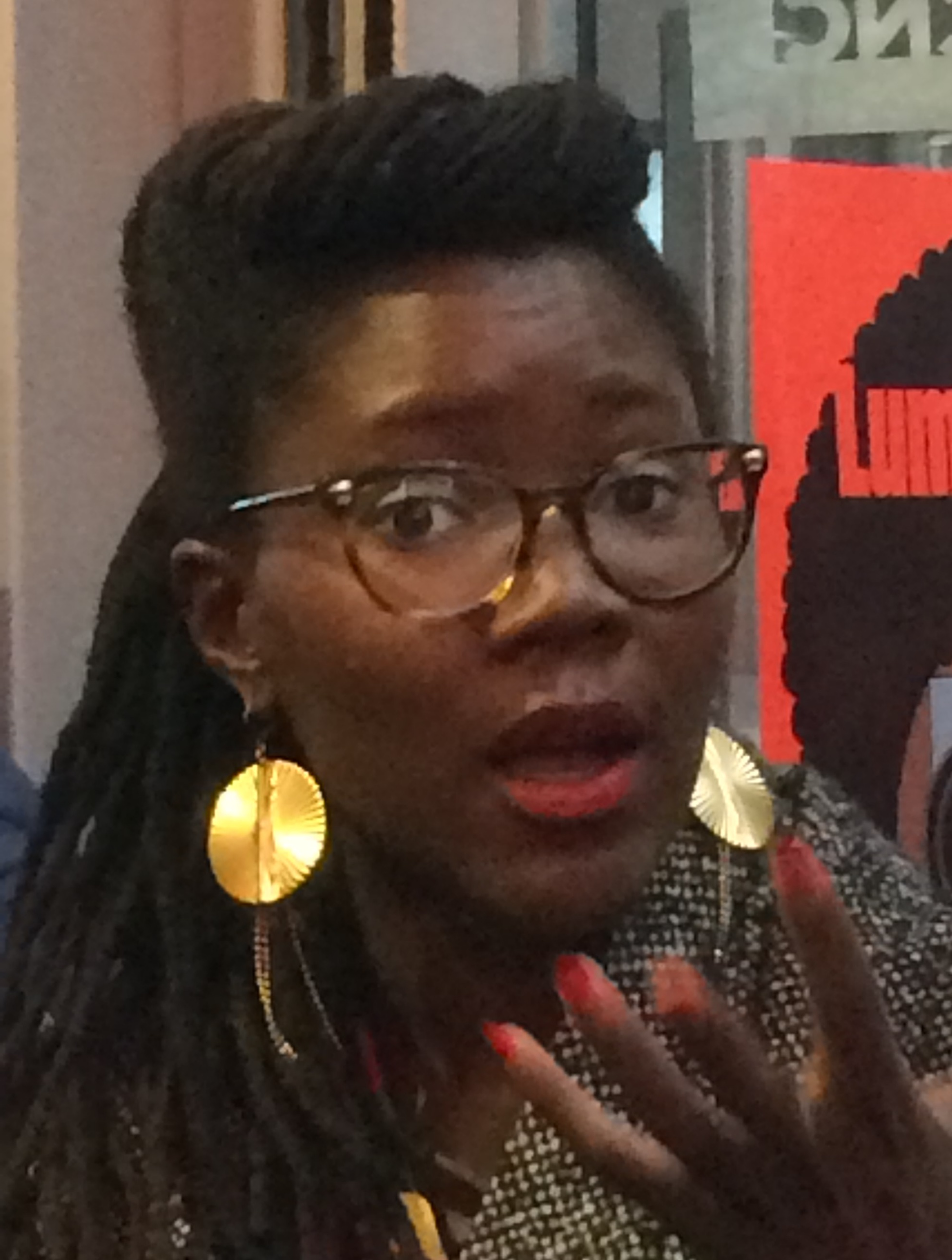
Alice Diop won for Saint Omer in 2022

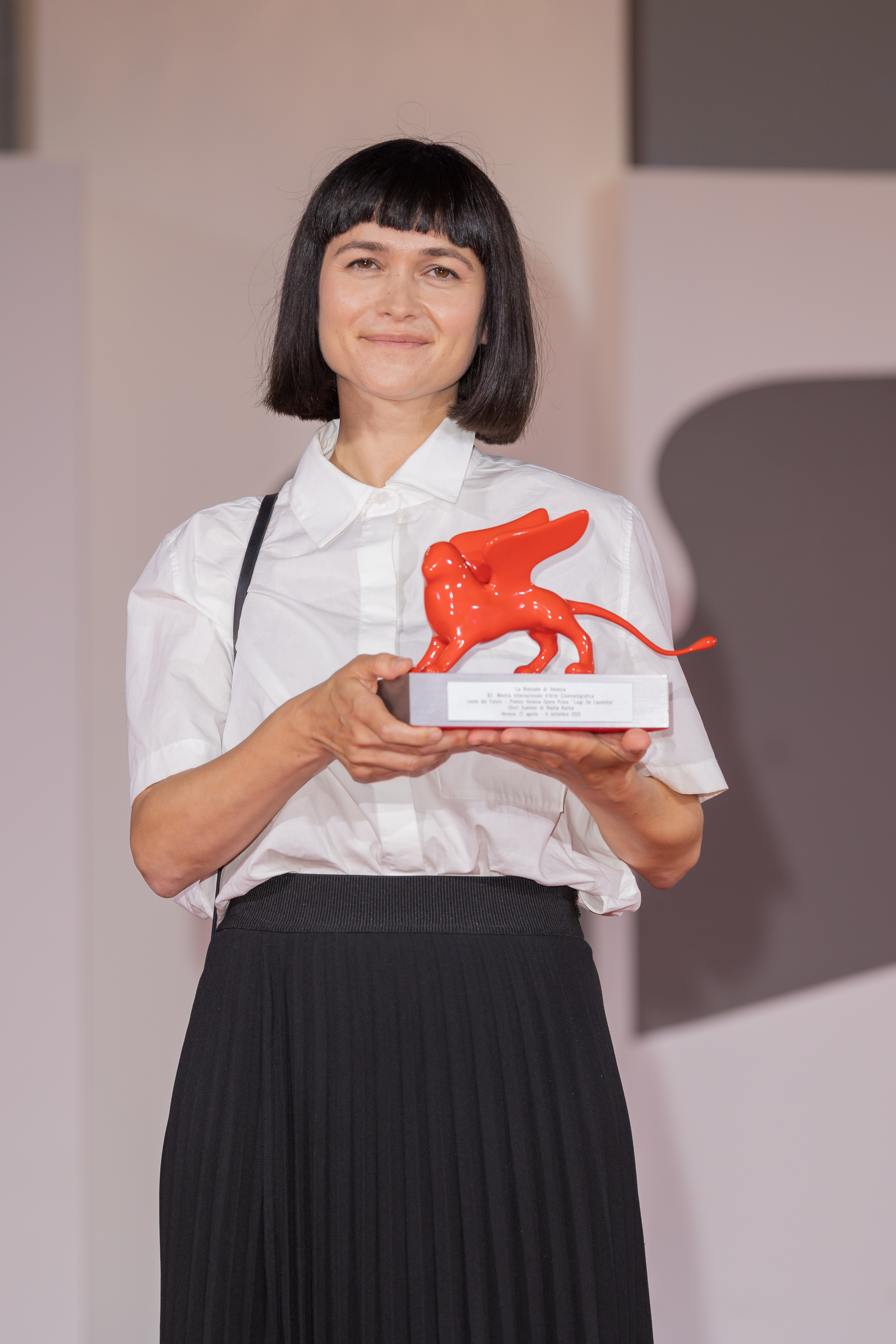
Nastia Korkia won for Short Summer (2025)

=== 1990s ===
Year	English Title	Original Title	Director	Production Country
1999	This Is the Garden	Questo è il giardino	Giovanni Maderna	Italy

=== 2000s ===
Year	English Title	Original Title	Director	Production Country
2000	Poetical Refugee	La Faute à Voltaire	Abdellatif Kechiche	France
2001	Bread and Milk	Kruh in mleko	Jan Cvitkovic	Slovenia
2002	Two Friends	Due Amici	Spiro Scimone and Francesco Sframeli	Italy
2002	Roger Dodger		Dylan Kidd	United States
2003	The Return	Возвращение	Andrey Zvyagintsev	Russia
2004	The Great Journey	Le Grand Voyage	Ismaël Ferroukhi	France, Morocco, Bulgaria, Turkey
2005	13 Tzameti		Géla Babluani	France
2006	Khadak		Jessica Woodworth and Peter Brosens	Belgium, Germany, Holland
2007	The Zone	La zona	Rodrigo Plá	Spain, Mexico
2008	Mid-August Lunch	Pranzo di ferragosto	Gianni Di Gregorio	Italy
2009	Clash	Engkwentro	Pepe Diokno	Philippines

=== 2010s ===
Year	English Title	Original Title	Director	Production Country
2010	Majority	Cogunluk	Seren Yüce	Turkey
2011	Là-bas: A Criminal Education	Là-bas - Educazione criminale	Guido Lombardi	Italy
2012	Mold	Küf	Ali Aydin	Turkey, Germany
2013	White Shadow		Noaz Deshe	Italy, Germany, Tanzania
2014	Court		Chaitanya Tamhane	India
2015	The Childhood of a Leader		Brady Corbet	United States, United Kingdom, Hungary, Sweden, France, Canada, Belgium
2016	The Last of Us	آخر واحد فينا	Ala Eddine Slim	Lebanon, Qatar, Tunisia, United Arab Emirates
2017	Custody	Jusqu'à la garde	Xavier Legrand	France
2018	The Day I Lost My Shadow	يوم أضعت ظلي	Soudade Kaadan	Syria, Lebanon, France, Qatar
2019	You Will Die at Twenty	ستموت في العشرين	Amjad Abu Alala	Sudan, France, Egypt, Germany, Norway

=== 2020s ===
Year	English Title	Original Title	Director	Production Country	Ref.
2020	Listen		Ana Rocha de Sousa	United Kingdom, Portugal	
2021	Immaculate	Imaculat	Monica Stan and George Chiper-Lillemark	Romania	
2022	Saint Omer		Alice Diop	France	
2023	Love Is a Gun	愛是一把槍	Lee Hong-chi	Hong Kong, Taiwan	
2024	Familiar Touch		Sarah Friedland	United States	
2025	Short Summer		Nastia Korkia	Germany, France, Serbia	
2026	House of the Wind	La maison du vent	Bernard Auguste Kouemo Yanghu	Cameroon, France, Belgium, Benin, Saudi Arabia, Qatar	

== Other winners ==
=== Special mentions ===
Year	English Title	Original Title	Director	Production Country
1999	Bye Bye Africa		Mahamat-Saleh Haroun	Chad, France
2004	Saimir		Francesco Munzi	Italy
2006	7 Years	7 Ans	Jean-Pascal Hattu	France
