= Waramutsého! =

- Directed by: Bernard Auguste Kouemo Yanghu
- Screenplay by: Bernard Auguste Kouemo Yanghu
- Produced by: Courte Échelle Prod
- Starring: Steve Achiepo, Clément Ntahobari, Cécile Malembic, and Claire Pailler
- Cinematography: Bertrand Artaud
- Edited by: Jean-Michel Cazenave, Geoffroy Cernaix
- Music by: Philippe Bonnaire
- Release date: 2008
- Running time: 21'
- Country: Cameroon
- Languages: French and Kinyarwanda, subtitled in Spanish

Waramutsého! (Bonjour!, Hello!) is a Cameroon 2008 short film by film director, screenwriter and actor Bernard Auguste Kouemo Yanghu, starring Steve Achiepo and Clément Ntahobari.

== Synopsis ==
Kabéra, a Hutu, and Uwamungu, a Tutsi, are a student and a young worker from Rwanda who live together in the suburbs of Toulouse, France. In 1994, chaos erupts in their home country and Kabéra finds out that members of his family have participated in the massacre of the family of his good friend, Uwamungu, during the Rwandan genocide in 1994.

== Awards ==
- African, Asian and Latin American Film Festival at Milan, Italy, 2009
  - Best African short film
  - ISMU Award for pedagogical merit
- FESPACO 2009
  - Poulain de bronze Award (Short film competition)
