= House of the Wind (film) =

2026 film by Bernard Auguste Kouemo Yanghu

- French: La maison du vent
- Directed by: Bernard Auguste Kouemo Yanghu
- Written by: Bernard Auguste Kouemo Yanghu
- Produced by: Linda Natacha Kwanya; Auguste Bernard Kouemo Yanghu; Arthur Grec; John Engel; Faissol Gnonlonfin
- Starring: Josette Kwanya; Moudjeu Pouadeu; Adrien Jolivet
- Cinematography: Eva Sehet
- Edited by: Ewin Ryckaert; Geoffroy Cernaix
- Music by: Michel Duprez; Blick Bassy
- Production companies: Horizons d'Afrique; La Mansarde Cinéma; Steel Fish Pictures; Merveilles Production; Red Sea Fund; Doha Film Institute
- Release date: 4 September 2026 (Venice)
- Running time: 102 minutes
- Countries: Cameroon; France; Belgium; Benin; Saudi Arabia; Qatar
- Languages: French; Bafang

House of the Wind (French: La maison du vent) is a 2026 drama film written and directed by Bernard Auguste Kouemo Yanghu. A co-production of Cameroon, France, Belgium, Benin, Saudi Arabia, and Qatar, inspired by Yanghu's own mother, it follows the eighty-year-old Josette (Josette Kwanya) in Yaoundé, after all her children left the country for the West.

The film had its world premiere in the Orizzonti section of the 83rd Venice International Film Festival on 4 September 2026, where it won the section's Special Jury Prize and the Lion of the Future.

== Premise ==
A lonely eighty-year-old Josette forms a unexpected bond with Sarah, a young neighbor, while awaits the return of her six children who live in the West.

== Cast ==
- Josette Kwanya as Josette
- Moudjeu Pouadeu as Sarah
- Adrien Jolivet
- Tatiana Rojo
- Martin Poulibe
- Babetida Sadjo

== Production ==
Produced by Linda Natacha Kwanya and Bernard Auguste Kouemo Yanghu for Horizons d'Afrique, Arthur Grec for La Mansarde Cinéma, John Engel for Steel Fish Pictures, Faissol Gnonlonfin for Merveilles Production, Red Sea Fund and Doha Film Institute.

Yanghu based the film in his mother's life, who had six children, but lived alone in Cameroon.

== Release ==
House of the Wind had its world premiere competing in the Orizzonti section of the 83rd Venice International Film Festival on 4 September 2026.

== Accolades ==
| Award / Film Festival | Date of ceremony | Category | Recipient(s) | Result | Ref. |
|---|---|---|---|---|---|
| Venice Film Festival | 12 September 2026 | Orizzonti Special Jury Prize | Bernard Auguste Kouemo Yanghu | Won | |
| Venice Film Festival | 12 September 2026 | Lion of the Future | Bernard Auguste Kouemo Yanghu | Won | |
