= Nastia Korkia =

Russian filmmaker

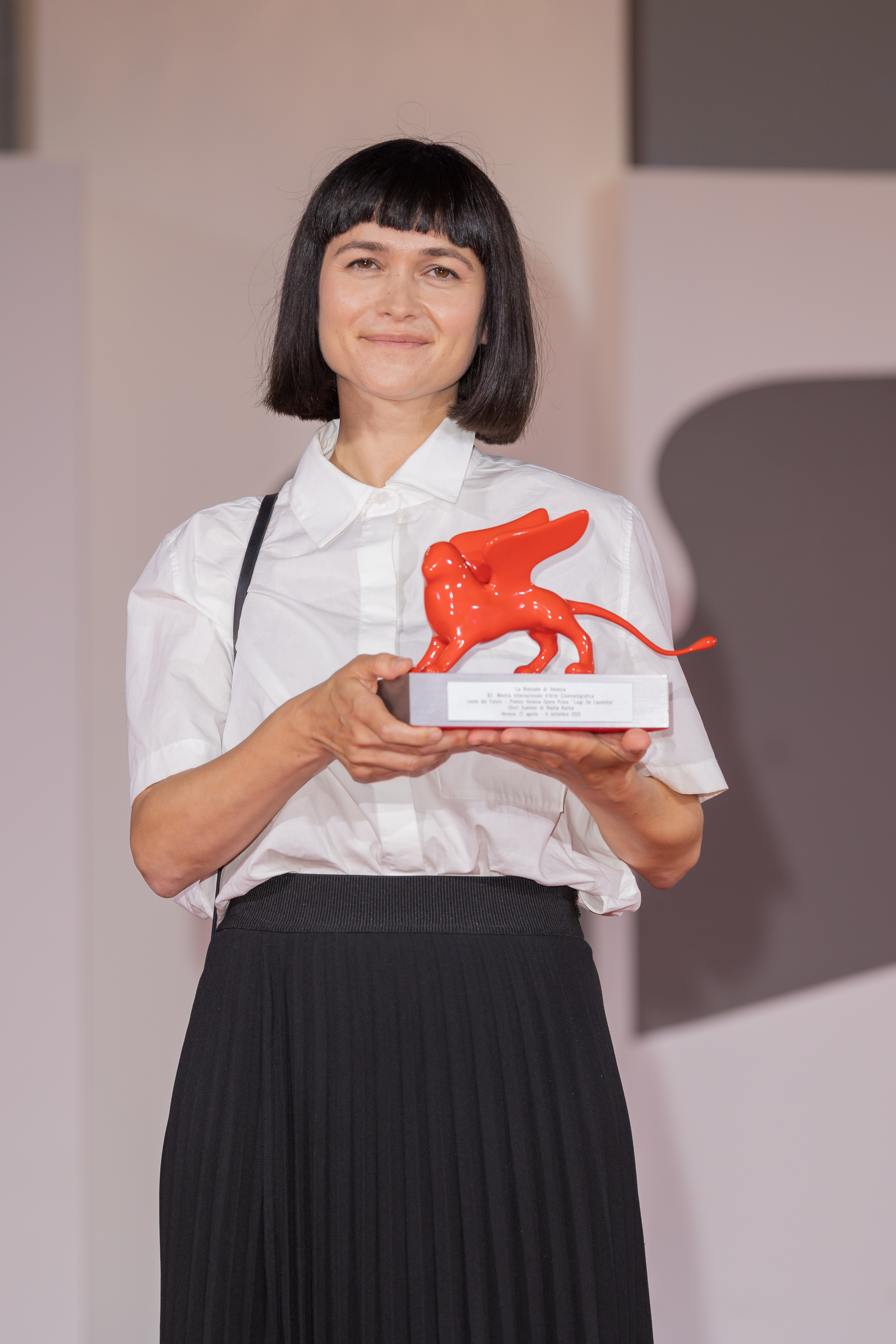
Korkia at the 2025 Venice Film Festival

Nastia Korkia (Russian: Настя Коркия) is a Russian film director, screenwriter and producer, best known for the 2025 film Short Summer.

== Life and career ==
Korkia was born in Moscow, the daughter of a poet father and a documentary filmmaker mother. She graduated in philology from the Moscow State University, and later studied directing at the Moscow School of New Cinema. She collaborated with TV Rain and in 2013 she co-founded the production company SKBD.SH.

After directing several short films, Korkia made her first feature-length documentary with GES‑2, which premiered in 2021 at the 78th Venice International Film Festival and was later screened at the True/False Film Festival. The same year, she enrolled at the DocNomads Erasmus Program, studying filmmaking in the Universities of Lisbon, Brussels, and Budapest. Following the Russian invasion of Ukraine, she chose to remain in Europe.

In 2025, Korkia made her feature film debut with the coming-of-age drama Short Summer. The film premiered at the 82nd Venice International Film Festival, where it won the Lion of the Future. It later won the Gold Hugo in the New Directors Competition at the 61st Chicago International Film Festival.

== Selected filmography ==
- GES‑2 (2021)
- Dreams About Putin (short, 2023)
- Short Summer (2025)
