= Short Summer =

2025 drama film

- International promotional poster
- Directed by: Nastia Korkia
- Written by: Nastia Korkia; Mikhail Bushkov
- Produced by: Dirk Decker; Natalya Drozd; Stefan Mladenovic; Andrea Schütte
- Starring: Maiia Pleshkevich; Aleksandr Feklistov
- Cinematography: Evgeny Rodin
- Edited by: Benjamin Mirguet
- Production companies: Tamtam; Totem Atelier; Art & Popcorn
- Release date: 27 August 2025 (Venice)
- Running time: 101 minutes
- Countries: Germany; France; Serbia
- Language: Russian

Short Summer is a 2025 coming-of-age drama film co-written and directed by Nastia Korkia, in her feature film debut. Starring Maiia Pleshkevich, Aleksandr Feklistov, Vesna Jovanovic, Yakov Karykhalin and Aleksandr Karpushin, it follows eight-year old Katya against the backdrop of the Chechen War.

The film had its world premiere at the Giornate degli Autori section of the 82nd Venice International Film Festival on 27 August 2025, where it won the Lion of the Future for best first feature film.

== Cast ==
- Maiia Pleshkevich as Katya
- Aleksandr Feklistov as Grandpa
- Vesna Jovanovic as Grandma
- Yakov Karykhalin as Lyosha
- Aleksandr Karpushin as Petya

== Production ==
Korkia got inspiration for the script from her own childhood experiences. The film was produced by Tamtam, with Totem Atelier and Art & Popcorn serving as co-producers. It was shot between August and September 2024 in various Serbian locations, notably Bor, Belgrade and Perlez.

== Release ==
The film had its world premiere at the 82nd edition of the Venice Film Festival, in the Giornate degli Autori sidebar. It was later screened in other festivals, including the BFI London Film Festival, the Chicago International Film Festival, the Filmfest Hamburg, and the Vienna International Film Festival.

== Reception ==
In Venice, the film won the Lion of the Future for Best Debut Feature. It later won the Gold Hugo in the New Directors Competition at the 61st Chicago International Film Festival, and received the 2026 Event of the Year Award from the Russian Guild of Film Critics.

The film was well-received by critics. Marc van de Klashorst from International Cinephile Society gave the film 5 stars out of 5, and referred to it as "masterful", "a truly remarkable piece of cinema", and "a formalistic masterpiece where the story exists as much in the background as in the coming-of-age drama at its heart." Screen International's film critic Allan Hunter also praised the film, describing it as "beautifully composed, acutely observed piece of storytelling delicately balancing the minutiae of family life with the impact of national events." Stephen Saito from The Moveable Fest further lauded the film, calling it "unique" and remarking "it's hard not to feel at least some hope when Korkia shows so much promise as a filmmaker and delivers so many striking images." Cineuropa's film critic Muriel Del Don wrote: "Both cruel and poetic, Short Summer is a film to be savoured at leisure, a tour de force which forces the audience to adopt the rhythm of a reality where observing is more important than taking action and feeling is more important than understanding."
