= Blue Moon (2025 film) =

2025 film by Richard Linklater

- Theatrical release poster
- Directed by: Richard Linklater
- Written by: Robert Kaplow
- Produced by: Mike Blizzard; John Sloss; Richard Linklater
- Starring: Ethan Hawke; Margaret Qualley; Bobby Cannavale; Andrew Scott
- Cinematography: Shane F. Kelly
- Edited by: Sandra Adair
- Music by: Graham Reynolds
- Production companies: Detour Filmproduction; Renovo Media Group
- Distributed by: Sony Pictures Classics
- Release dates: February 18, 2025 (Berlinale); October 17, 2025 (United States)
- Running time: 100 minutes
- Country: United States
- Language: English
- Box office: $3 million

Blue Moon is a 2025 American biographical comedy-drama film directed by Richard Linklater and written by Robert Kaplow, inspired by the letters of Elizabeth Weiland to Lorenz Hart. The film stars Ethan Hawke, Margaret Qualley, Bobby Cannavale, and Andrew Scott. Its plot follows Hart as he reflects on himself on the opening night of Oklahoma!, a new musical by his former colleague Richard Rodgers.

Blue Moon had its world premiere at the main competition of the 75th Berlin International Film Festival on February 18, 2025, where it won the Silver Bear for Best Supporting Performance for Scott. At the 83rd Golden Globe Awards, it was nominated for Best Motion Picture – Musical or Comedy and Best Actor for Hawke. At the 98th Academy Awards, Kaplow was nominated for Best Original Screenplay and Hawke for Best Actor.

It was theatrically released in the United States by Sony Pictures Classics on October 17, 2025, and received positive reviews from critics.

== Plot ==
On March 31, 1943, Lorenz Hart slips away from the opening night of Oklahoma!, the new Broadway musical his former creative partner Richard Rodgers has written with Oscar Hammerstein II. Hart arrives at Sardi's restaurant, where preparations are underway for the opening night celebration.

The newly sober Hart holds court with the bartender, Eddie, who tries not to serve him liquor, and the piano player, Morty, an enlisted sergeant on leave. They commiserate with Hart as he complains about the sensational success of Oklahoma!, which he declined to write, and the state of his own career. Declaring himself "omnisexual", Hart attempts to flirt with a flower delivery boy and reveals his infatuation with Elizabeth Weiland, a Yale art student and aspiring production designer. After months of correspondence and an unconsummated weekend with the 20-year-old Elizabeth, 47-year-old Hart believes this may be the night he fully wins her love.

Elizabeth arrives for the party, where Hart plans to shower her with gifts and even a card trick. Meanwhile, he recognizes E. B. White sitting nearby, and seeks out his opinions as a fellow writer. Later, Hart intrigues White with the story of a mouse who keeps coming back to his 19th floor apartment. White asks whether he has named the mouse and Hart comes up with "Stuart". White (the future author of Stuart Little) jots something in his notebook.

Arriving with Hammerstein and a crowd of well-wishers, Rodgers pulls Hart aside to suggest collaborating again on a revival of their show A Connecticut Yankee. Hart pitches his idea for a grand musical about Marco Polo, but his struggles with alcohol and depression have strained their 24-year partnership. In the restroom, Hart tells Morty the story of his failed proposal to his former muse Vivienne Segal, who did not love him, or at least "not that way".

As rave reviews pour in for Oklahoma!, Hart tries to congratulate Rodgers, who knows him too well not to recognize his disdain for the show. Despite their friendship, Rodgers remains wary of Hart's drinking and unreliability. It becomes clear that Hart's idea is fueled by his unrequited feelings for Elizabeth. Finding comfort with Eddie in their shared love of Casablanca, Hart signs an autograph for Elizabeth's friend, the aspiring director George Roy Hill. Hart swallows his jealousy to congratulate Hammerstein, who is planning another musical with Rodgers and introduces his young protégé Stevie (whom the closing credits identify as "Stevie Sondheim").

Hart pulls Elizabeth into the coatroom for a private conversation, as she confides in him about her trysts with a fellow student. Hart is heartbroken to hear that even though the boy has abandoned her, Elizabeth is hopelessly smitten. She explains that she loves Hart, but "not that way", and he is further hurt when she mentions his rumored homosexuality. As promised, Hart introduces Elizabeth to Rodgers, but is dismayed when Rodgers gives her his private number and whisks her away to his own party.

Hart prepares to leave. Morty plays Hart's greatest hit, "Blue Moon", and Hart stays for a drink with Eddie as the staff close the restaurant, regaling them with another story. Seven months later, Hart drunkenly collapses in the street and dies a few days later in the hospital. Rodgers and Hammerstein become Broadway's greatest partnership.

== Cast ==
- Ethan Hawke as Lorenz Hart
- Margaret Qualley as Elizabeth Weiland
- Bobby Cannavale as Eddie
- Andrew Scott as Richard Rodgers
- Jonah Lees as Morty Rifkin
- Simon Delaney as Oscar Hammerstein II
- Cillian Sullivan as Stephen Sondheim
- Patrick Kennedy as E. B. White
- John Doran as Weegee
- Anne Brogan as Frieda Hart
- David Rawle as George Roy Hill

== Production ==
A biopic of Lorenz Hart written by Robert Kaplow was reported in June 2024 with Richard Linklater attached as director and producer, alongside John Sloss. Later that month, Ethan Hawke, Margaret Qualley, Bobby Cannavale, and Andrew Scott joined the cast and Sony Pictures Classics was reported to have acquired worldwide distribution rights and joined the project as co-financier. Linklater and Hawke had discussed making the film together in the previous decade but Linklater felt Hawke was not yet old enough. In 2025, Linklater said he had worked on the film for 12 years. For the role, Hawke shaved his head for Hart's combover to be placed on top. To depict Hart's diminutive stature, the production used what Hawke called "old stagecraft".

Rick would say, "I need you to have more lines in your face." I'm like, "We'll fake it." He said, "No, we won't fake anything. We'll wait." He's so patient. He could have just went and hired a different actor or whatever. But he didn't. He just waited.

Principal photography took place over 15 days on a soundstage in Dublin, Ireland. Regular Linklater collaborator Graham Reynolds composed the score.

== Release ==
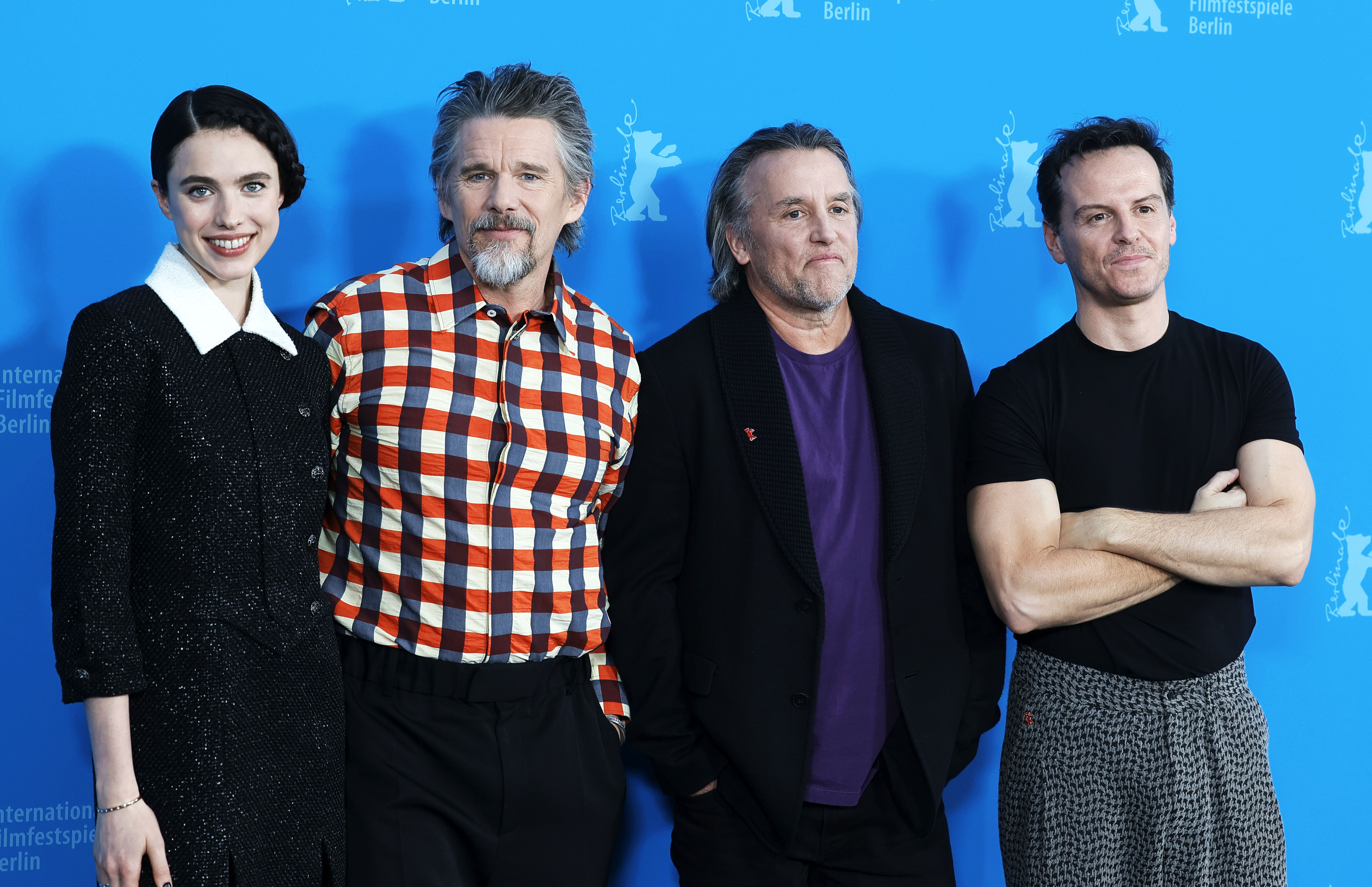
(L-R) Qualley, Hawke, Linklater, and Scott at the 2025 Berlinale

Blue Moon premiered at the 75th Berlin International Film Festival on February 18, 2025. The film had a limited theatrical release on October 17 and a wide release on October 24.

Blue Moon screened in the Icon section of the 2025 Stockholm International Film Festival on November 9. As part of a first window deal with Netflix, the movie was made available for an 18-month period beginning on February 14, 2026.

== Reception ==
=== Box office ===
The film made $554,321 on its first wide release weekend at the United States and Canada box office.

=== Critical response ===
On the review aggregator website Rotten Tomatoes, 90% of 241 critics' reviews are positive, with an average rating of 7.6/10. The website's consensus reads: "While not the flashiest Richard Linklater film, Blue Moon boasts a wonderful performance by Ethan Hawke as he embodies a man hanging on by a thread while the audience hangs on to every word said." Metacritic, which uses a weighted average, assigned the film a score of 78 out of 100, based on 44 critics, indicating "generally favorable" reviews.

In a three-star review, Moira MacDonald of The Seattle Times wrote, "Linklater really nails the atmosphere here; watching Blue Moon feels like sitting with smart people in a retro bar, covered in a gentle blanket of cocktail piano." Peter Bradshaw in The Guardian particularly praised Hawke's "terrific performance" and awarded the film four stars out of five. Tara Brady of The Irish Times gave the film an unremarkable review, writing: "Blue Moon features a luminous ensemble and arguably a career-high performance from Ethan Hawke, yet it's hobbled by an aesthetic gamble so distracting, so patently absurd, that it nearly sinks the enterprise," referring to Linklater's efforts to disguise Hawke's true height, almost a foot taller than Hart.

== Accolades ==
Scott won the Silver Bear for Best Supporting Performance at the Berlin Film Festival.

At the 98th Academy Awards, Kaplow was nominated for Best Original Screenplay and Hawke for Best Actor.

Award	Date of ceremony	Category	Recipient	Result	Ref.
AARP Movies for Grownups Awards	January 10, 2026	Best Actor	Ethan Hawke	Nominated	
Academy Awards	March 15, 2026	Best Actor	Ethan Hawke	Nominated	
Academy Awards	March 15, 2026	Best Original Screenplay	Robert Kaplow	Nominated	
Artios Awards	February 26, 2026	Feature Studio or Independent – Drama	Olivia Scott-Webb	Nominated	
Austin Film Critics Association	December 18, 2025	Best Actor	Ethan Hawke	Nominated	
Austin Film Critics Association	December 18, 2025	Best Austin Film	Richard Linklater	Won	
Berlin International Film Festival	February 23, 2025	Golden Bear	Blue Moon	Nominated	
Berlin International Film Festival	February 23, 2025	Silver Bear for Best Supporting Performance	Andrew Scott	Won	
Boston Society of Film Critics	December 14, 2025	Best Actor	Ethan Hawke	Won	
Boston Society of Film Critics	December 14, 2025	Best Original Screenplay	Robert Kaplow	Won	
British Academy of Film and Television Arts Awards	February 22, 2026	Best Actor in a Leading Role	Ethan Hawke	Nominated	
Chicago Film Critics Association	December 11, 2025	Best Actor	Ethan Hawke	Nominated	
Chicago Film Critics Association	December 11, 2025	Best Original Screenplay	Robert Kaplow	Nominated	
Critics' Choice Movie Awards	January 4, 2026	Best Actor	Ethan Hawke	Nominated	
Dallas–Fort Worth Film Critics Association	December 17, 2025	Best Actor	Ethan Hawke	4th place	
Golden Globe Awards	January 11, 2026	Best Motion Picture – Musical or Comedy	Blue Moon	Nominated	
Golden Globe Awards	January 11, 2026	Best Actor – Musical or Comedy	Ethan Hawke	Nominated	
Gotham Independent Film Awards	December 1, 2025	Outstanding Lead Performance	Ethan Hawke	Nominated	
Gotham Independent Film Awards	December 1, 2025	Outstanding Supporting Performance	Andrew Scott	Nominated	
London Film Critics Circle	February 1, 2026	Actor of the Year	Ethan Hawke	Nominated	
Los Angeles Film Critics Association Awards	December 7, 2025	Best Lead Performance	Ethan Hawke	Won (Note: Also awarded to Rose Byrne)	
Los Angeles Film Critics Association Awards	December 7, 2025	Best Supporting Performance	Andrew Scott	Runner-up	
National Society of Film Critics Awards	January 3, 2026	Best Actor	Ethan Hawke	Won	
National Society of Film Critics Awards	January 3, 2026	Best Original Screenplay	Robert Kaplow	Nominated	
San Francisco Bay Area Film Critics Circle	14 December 2025	Best Actor	Ethan Hawke	Won	
Seattle Film Critics Society	December 15, 2025	Best Actor in a Leading Role	Ethan Hawke	Nominated	
St. Louis Film Critics Association Awards	December 14, 2025	Best Actor	Ethan Hawke	Nominated	
St. Louis Film Critics Association Awards	December 14, 2025	Best Supporting Actor	Andrew Scott	Nominated	
St. Louis Film Critics Association Awards	December 14, 2025	Best Original Screenplay	Robert Kaplow	Nominated	
Toronto Film Critics Association	March 2, 2026	Outstanding Lead Performance	Ethan Hawke	Won	
Washington D.C. Area Film Critics Association Awards	December 7, 2025	Best Actor	Ethan Hawke	Nominated	
