= Kathleen Chalfant =

American actress (born 1945)

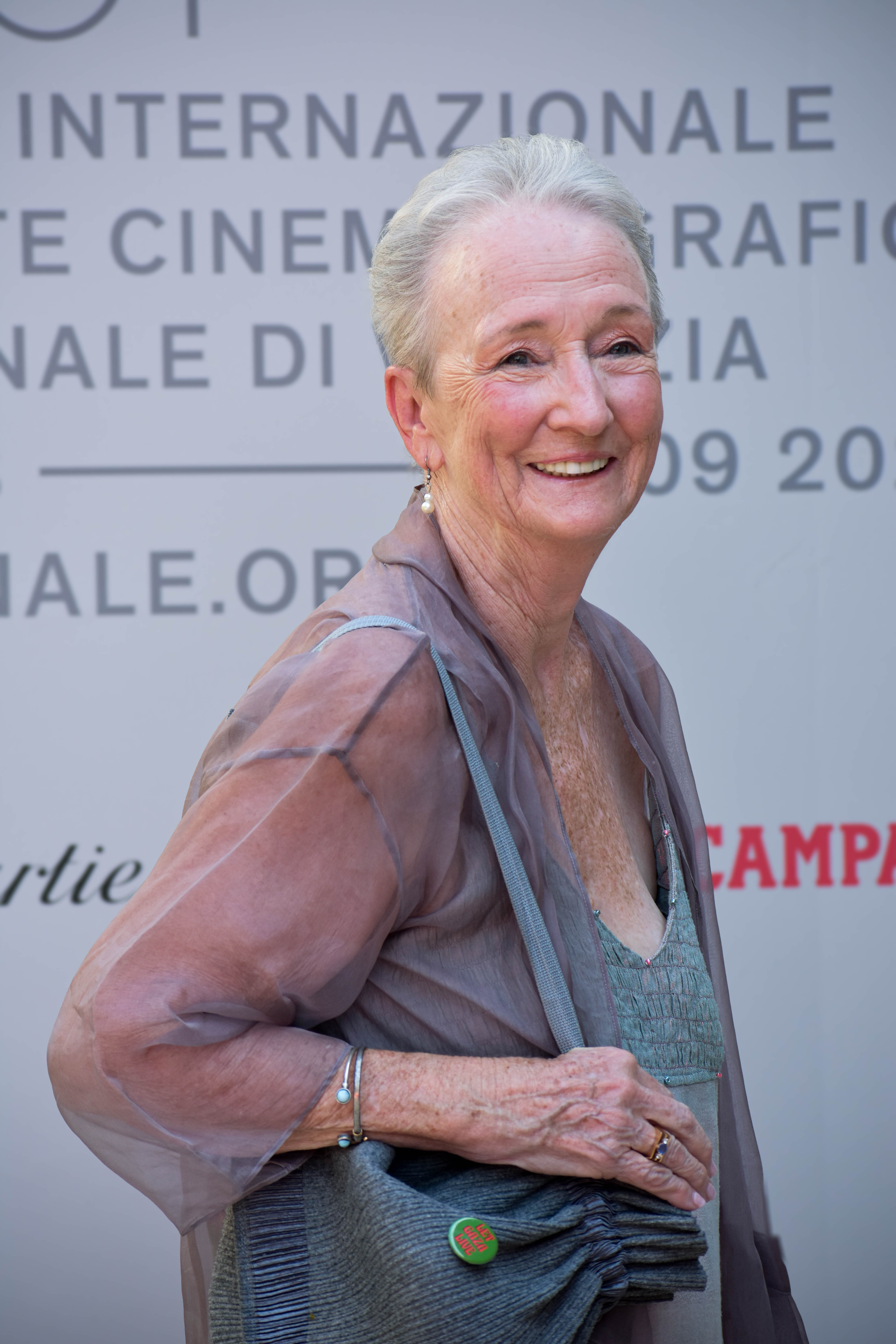
- Chalfant in 2025
- Born: Kathleen Ann Bishop; January 14, 1945 (age 81); San Francisco, California, U.S.
- Occupation: Actress
- Years active: 1974–present
- Spouse: Henry Chalfant (m. 1966)
- Children: 2

Kathleen Ann Chalfant (née Bishop; born January 14, 1945) is an American actress best known for her extensive work on stage. Over the course of her career, her performances on Broadway and Off-Broadway have earned her numerous accolades, including two Obie Awards, two Lucille Lortel Awards, a Drama Desk Award, a Drama League Award, an Outer Critics Circle Award, and the Joe A. Callaway Award.

In 1993, Chalfant received a Tony Award nomination for originating the role of Hannah Pitt in Tony Kushner's two-part epic Angels in America at the Walter Kerr Theatre.

In 2024, she starred in Sarah Friedland's feature film Familiar Touch. Her performance earned the Orizzonti Award for Best Actress at the 81st Venice International Film Festival, as well as the National Society of Film Critics Award for Best Actress. She also received nominations for the Independent Spirit Award for Best Lead Performance and the New York Film Critics Circle Award for Best Actress.

== Early life ==
Chalfant was born Kathleen Ann Bishop in San Francisco, California, and was raised in her parents' boarding house in Oakland. Her father, William Bishop, was an officer in the Coast Guard. She studied acting in New York with Wynn Handman, who was a protégé of Sanford Meisner, and with Alessandro Fersen in Rome.

== Career ==
Chalfant worked as a Production Coordinator at Playwrights Horizons in the mid-1970s, beginning with Demons: A Possession by Robert Karmon. She made her Off-Broadway acting debut in Cowboy Pictures in June 1974. She has since appeared in over three dozen Off-Broadway productions.

Chalfant was nominated for her official Broadway debut role at the 1993 Tony Awards for Best Actress (Featured Role - Play) in Tony Kushner's Angels in America: Millennium Approaches. She earned the Outer Circle Critics, Drama Desk, Obie and Lucille Lortel awards for her performance as Vivian Bearing in Margaret Edson's Pulitzer Prize-winning play Wit in 1998; she shaved her head for the role. During her work with Wit, she incorporated her experiences dealing with terminal cancer of her half-brother, Alan Palmer, who died in 1998.

For her 2003 performance in Alan Bennett's Talking Heads, Chalfant won a second Obie award. In 2009, Chalfant performed in The People Speak, a documentary feature film utilizing dramatic and musical performances of the letters, diaries, and speeches of everyday Americans, based on historian Howard Zinn's A People's History of the United States. In 2015, she appeared in the Women's Project Theater production of Dear Elizabeth by Sarah Ruhl and as Rose Kennedy in the Nora's Playhouse production of Rose by Laurence Leamer.

Chalfant has played recurring roles in a number of television series including House of Cards, Law & Order, Rescue Me, and The Guardian. Her roles in feature films have included Isn't It Delicious and Kinsey. Chalfant recently played Margaret Butler in The Affair on Showtime.

She was presented with the 2018 Obie Award for Lifetime Achievement. In 2018, Chalfant read T. S. Eliot's Four Quartets at the Bard SummerScape Festival as part of a new performance with choreography by Pam Tanowitz, music by Kaija Saariaho, and images by Brice Marden.

Chalfant played the lead role in the 2024 film Familiar Touch, for which she won the Orizzonti Award for Best Actress and the National Society of Film Critics Award for Best Actress.

== Personal life ==
In 1966, Chalfant married Henry Chalfant, a photographer and documentary filmmaker. They have a son, David Chalfant, who was the bass player for the folk-rock band The Nields, and a daughter, Andromache, a set designer in New York.

== Activism ==
Chalfant has spoken about the role of art and artists in advocating for civil rights and social justice, and "theater as a platform for social change."

She has been hosted by the Center for Constitutional Rights as part of the Guantanamo Lawyers Panel, and was among a group of artists endorsing a cultural boycott of Israel as part of the Boycott, Divestment and Sanctions (BDS) campaign to advocate for Palestinian rights.

In September 2025, she signed an open pledge with Film Workers for Palestine pledging not to work with Israeli film institutions "that are implicated in genocide and apartheid against the Palestinian people."

== Filmography ==
=== Film ===
Year	Title	Role	Notes
1987	Five Corners	Mrs. Fitzgerald	
1989	Miss Firecracker	Miss Lily	
1990	Tales from the Darkside: The Movie	Dean	Segment: "Lot 249"
1991	Dangerous Music	Therapist	Short
1991	Out of the Rain	Ruth	
1992	Bob Roberts	Constance Roberts	
1996	MURDER and murder	Mildred	
1998	The Last Days of Disco	Zenia	
1998	Side Streets	Nanda	
1999	QM, I Think I Call Her QM	Dr. Ruth Fielding	Short
2000	Company Man	Mother Quimp	
2000	Woman Found Dead in Elevator	Woman	Short
2002	Book of Kings	Nina	Short
2004	Kinsey	Barbara Merkle	
2007	First Born	Mrs. Kasperian	
2007	Perfect Stranger	Elizabeth Clayton	
2007	The Last New Yorker	Mimi	
2008	Second Guessing Grandma	Jean	Short
2009	Duplicity	Pam Frailes	
2012	Lillian	Lillian Manning	Short
2013	Isn't It Delicious	Joan Weldon	
2013	The Bath	Liz	Short
2013	A Dream of Flying	Old Woman	Short
2017	They Shall Not Perish: The Story of Near East Relief	Mabel Elliot	Documentary
2017	Class Rank	Editor in Chief	
2017	In the Studio	Ilene	
2020	Before/During/After	Olga	
2021	Old	Agnes	
2024	Familiar Touch	Ruth	
2025	Where to Land	Elizabeth	

=== Television ===
Year	Title	Role	Notes
1978–79	The Edge of Night	Louise	TV series
1991	American Playhouse	Mrs. Hauser	"The Hollow Boy"
1992	L.A. Law	Marlene Branson	"Zo Long"
1994	All My Children	Rae Ella	1 episode
1997	Spin City	Mother Superior	"Hot in the City"
1997–2000	Prince Street		TV series
1999	Storm of the Century	Joanna Stanhope	TV miniseries
2000	The Beat	Mrs. Waclawek	"Someone to Watch Over Me"
2000	Law & Order: Special Victims Unit	Mrs. Nash	"Noncompliance"
2001	Law & Order: Criminal Intent	Priscilla Van Acker	"Smothered"
2001–09	Law & Order	Lisa Cutler	"Phobia", "Shrunk", "Illegitimate"
2001–04	The Guardian	Laurie Solt	Main role
2002	Benjamin Franklin	Silence Dogood	TV miniseries documentary
2002	A Death in the Family	Aunt Hannah	TV film
2005	Lackawanna Blues	Mrs. Carmichael	TV film
2006	The Book of Daniel	Catherine Webster	Regular role
2007	Law & Order: Criminal Intent	Bessie Holland	"Bombshell"
2007	Law & Order: Special Victims Unit	Judge Cutress	"Haystack"
2009	Rescue Me	Sean's Ma	Recurring role
2009	Georgia O'Keeffe	Mrs. Stieglitz	TV film
2009	Mercy	Mrs. Borghouse	"Can We Get That Drink Now?"
2012	NYC 22	Ginny Williams	"Pilot"
2013	Elementary	Mrs. Clennon	"An Unnatural Arrangement"
2013	Muhammad Ali's Greatest Fight	Ethel Harlan	TV film
2013–16	House of Cards	Margaret Tilden	Recurring role
2014	The Americans	Aunt Helen	"The Walk In"
2014	Good Medicine	Coco LaRue	"Raj"
2014	Forever	Gloria Carlyle	"The Art of Murder"
2014–15	The Strain	Abraham's Grandmother	"Runaways", "BK, NY"
2014–15	Law & Order: Special Victims Unit	President Roberts	"Pornstar's Requiem", "Devastating Story"
2014–19	The Affair	Margaret Butler	Recurring role
2015–16	Madam Secretary	Dean Ward	"The Ninth Circle", "Unity Node", "Render Safe"
2016	Heartbeat	Sam's grandmother	"Backwards"
2017	Doubt	Margaret Brennan	5 episodes
2019	High Maintenance	Mamie	"Fingerbutt"
2019	New Amsterdam	Molly	"The Denominator"
2021	The Blacklist	Alberta Gilbert	"The Skinner (No. 45): Conclusion"
2022	Bull	Judge Steiner	2 episodes
2025	The Copenhagen Test	St. George	8 episodes

== Theatre ==
Year	Show	Role	Venue
1974	Cowboy Pictures	n/a	Playwrights Horizons
1975	The Coroner's Plot	n/a	Playwrights Horizons
1975	Mississippi Moonshine	n/a	Playwrights Horizons
1976	Paradise	n/a	Playwrights Horizons
1977	Jules Feiffer's Hold Me!	n/a	Westside Theatre
1978	Fefu and Her Friends	n/a (understudy)	American Place Theatre
1980	Killings on the Last Time	n/a	American Place Theatre
1982	Sister Mary Ignatius Explains It All for You/The Actor's Nightmare	Sister Mary Ignatius/Sarah Siddons (replacement)	Westside Theatre
1988	Just Say No	Mrs. Potentate	WPA Theatre
1989	The Investigation of the Murder in El Salvador	Lady Aitkin	Perry Street Theater
1990	The Crucible	Mrs. Ann Putnam	Union Square Theater
1990	M. Butterfly	Helga (understudy)	Eugene O'Neill Theatre
1992	The Party	Women	Vineyard Theater
1993	Angels in America: Millennium Approaches	Rabbi Chemelwitz, Henry, Hannah Pitt, Ethel Rosenberg	Walter Kerr Theatre
1993	Angels in America: Perestroika	Prelapsarianov, Hannah Pitt, Henry, Ethel Rosenberg, Council of Principalities, Rabbi Chemelwitz	Walter Kerr Theatre
1995	Iphigenia and Other Daughters	Clytemnestra	East 13th Street Theatre/Classic Stage Company
1995	Twelve Dreams	Jenny	Mitzi E. Newhouse Theater
1995	Endgame	Clov	East 13th Street Theatre/Classic Stage Company
1995	Racing Demon	Heather Espy	Vivian Beaumont Theatre
1996	Henry V	Mistress Quickly/Queen Isabel	Delacorte Theatre
1996	Nine Armenians	Non/Marie	New York City Center-Stage I
1998	Phaedra in Delirium	n/a	East 13th Street Theatre/Classic Stage Company
1998	Wit	Vivian Bearing, Ph.D.	MCC Theater
1998	Wit	Vivian Bearing, Ph.D.	Union Square Theatre
1999	The Vagina Monologues	n/a	Westside Theatre
1999	True History and Real Adventures	n/a	Vineyard Theatre
2003	Talking Heads	Susan (Bed Among the Lentils)	Minetta Lane Theatre
2003	Savannah Bay	Madeleine	East 13th Street Theatre/Classic Stage Company
2003	The Last Letter	Anna Semyonova	Lucille Lortel Theatre
2004	Guantanamo: Honor Bound to Defend Freedom	Gareth Peirce	Theatres at 45 Bleecker/Bleecker Street Theatre
2004	Five By Tenn	Anna/Vera Cartwright/Frieda/One	New York City Center-Stage II
2006	an oak tree	Father	Barrow Street Theatre
2006	Great Expectations	Miss Havisham	Lucille Lortel Theatre
2007	Spalding Gray: Stories Left to Tell	Love	Minetta Lane Theatre
2007	A Hard Heart	n/a	Harold Clurman Theatre
2008	Dead Man's Cell Phone	Mrs. Gottlieb	Playwrights Horizons
2009	The Intelligent Homosexual's Guide to Capitalism and Socialism with a Key to the Scriptures	Benedicta Immacolata Marcantonio (Bennie)	Guthrie Theater
2010	Family Week	Lena	Lucille Lortel Theatre
2012	Red Dog Howls	Rose Afratian	New York Theatre Workshop
2013	Somewhere Fun	Evelyn Armstrong	Vineyard Theatre
2014	Tales From Red Vienna	Edda Schmidt	New York City Center- Stage I
2014	A Walk in the Woods	Irina Botvinnik	Clurman Theater
2015	Dear Elizabeth	Elizabeth	McGinn-Cazale Theatre
2015	Rose	Rose Kennedy	Clurman Theater
2017	For Peter Pan on Her 70th Birthday	Ann	Playwrights Horizons
2018	St. Vincent's Project: Novenas for a Hospital	Sister Elizabeth Ann Seton	Rattlestick Playwrights Theatre
2021	Four Quartets	Narrator	Brooklyn Academy of Music
2024	Here There Are Blueberries	Judy Cohen and others	New York Theatre Workshop
2025	Pen Pals	Bernie / Mags	DR2 Theatre

== Awards and nominations ==
Year	Award	Category	Work	Result
1993	Drama Desk Awards	Outstanding Featured Actress in a Play	Angels in America: Millennium Approaches	Nominated
1993	Tony Awards	Best Featured Actress in a Play	Angels in America: Millennium Approaches	Nominated
1994	Drama Desk Awards	Outstanding Actress in a Play	Angels in America: Perestroika	Nominated
1996	Actors' Equity Association	Joe A. Callaway Award	Henry V	Won
1997	Drama Desk Awards	Outstanding Featured Actress in a Play	Nine Armenians	Nominated
1999	Outer Critics Circle Awards	Outstanding Actress in a Play	Wit	Won
1999	Obie Awards	Outstanding Performance	Wit	Won
1999	Drama League Awards	Distinguished Performance	Wit	Won
1999	Drama Desk Awards	Outstanding Actress in a Play	Wit	Won
1999	Lucille Lortel Awards	Outstanding Actress	Wit	Won
2003	Obie Awards	Best Performance	Talking Heads	Won
2004	Lucille Lortel Awards	Edith Oliver Award for Sustained Excellence	—N/a	Won
2015	Drama Desk Awards	Outstanding Actress in a Play	A Walk in the Woods	Nominated
2016	Drama Desk Awards	Outstanding Solo Performance	Rose	Nominated
2024	Venice Film Festival	Orizzonti Award for Best Actress	Familiar Touch	Won
2025	National Society of Film Critics	Best Actress	Familiar Touch	Won
