= Carolyn Michelle Smith =

American actress (born 1979)

- Born: July 8, 1979 (age 47); Washington, DC, United States
- Occupation: Actress
- Years active: 2013–present

Carolyn Michelle Smith is an American actor known for her roles in House of Cards, Marvel's Luke Cage, Russian Doll, and Colony.

== Career ==
Smith acted in the Romeo and Juliet Broadway show starting Orlando Bloom and Condola Rashad, directed by David Leveaux. She played Willa Penton in season one and two of House of Cards. She acted in "Soldier X" at the Ma-Yi Theatre Company, in "Hit The Wall" at the Barrow Street Theatre, and in "Serial. Black. Face" Workshop at the Signature Theatre Company. She acted in the play "Rich Girl" at the Old Globe Theatre in San Diego.

In 2021, Smith was cast in a recurring role in the second season of Netflix original series Russian Doll. She played the grandmother, Agnes, of Alan Zaveri who is portrayed by Charlie Barnett. She appears as Deja in season five of The Chi.
