= Bernard Auguste Kouemo Yanghu =

Cameroonian filmmaker

- Yanghu in 2026
- Born: 1976 (age 49–50); Yaounde, Cameroon
- Occupations: Film director, screenwriter, actor
- Writing career
- Language: Portuguese
- Notable works: Waramutsého! (short film, 2008)

Bernard Auguste Kouemo Yanghu (born 1976 in Yaoundé, Cameroon) is a Cameroonian filmmaker, screenwriter and actor. He created many short films and video clips and won awards for his 2008 short Waramutseho! (Bonjour!) on the Rwandan genocide.

== Filmography ==
Kouemo's films include:

Year	Film	Genre	Role	Stars	Duration (min)
2002	L’enveloppe	Short	Director		
2006	Le premier pas	Short	Director		
2008	Racines	Short	Director		
2006	Lent demain by Charoki Sonia	Drama short	Actor	Romain Carcanade, Bernard Auguste Kouemo Yanghu, Leclair Nadège, Morel Romain	10 m
2009	Waramutseho! (Bonjour!)	Drama short. The Hutu family of student Kabéra has murdered the Tutsi family of his friend in the Rwandan genocide of 1994.	Screenwriter, director	Steve Achiepo, Clément Ntahobari, Cécile Malembic, and Claire Pailler	21 m
2015	Les empreintes douloureuses (translated title: Painful Imprints)	Drama short. Thirty-something Nathalie is hosting her mother on holiday in France and wants to have a nose job.	Screenwriter, director	Josette Kwanya, Bwanga Pilipili	22 m
2022	Mon ami Fukushima	Drama short. Emile wants to help his friend and petanque-partner Thomas, who has schizophrenia.	Screenwriter, director	Ahmed Dramé, Adrien Jolivet, Miss Ming, Raph	27 m
2026	La Maison du Vent (House of the Wind)	Drama feature. In Yaoundé, lonely Josette (80) wants her emigrated children back from Europe.	Screenwriter, director	Babetida Sadjo, Tatiana Rojo, Adrien Jolivet	

== Awards ==
Kouemo's films won several awards, including:

Film	Festival	Award
Waramutseho! (Bonjour!), 2008	Panafrican Film and Television Festival of Ouagadougou (FESPACO)	2009 Poulain de bronze (Bronze veal), short film award
	African, Asian and Latin American Film Festival (FESCAAAL, Milan)	2009 Premio Migliore Cortometraggio Africano – Premio Eni al Miglior Cortometraggio Africano (Best African Short Award)
	Amiens International Film Festival (FIFAM)	2009 Grand Prix du court métrage (Short Film Grand Prize)
