= Sarah Friedland =

American filmmaker and choreographer

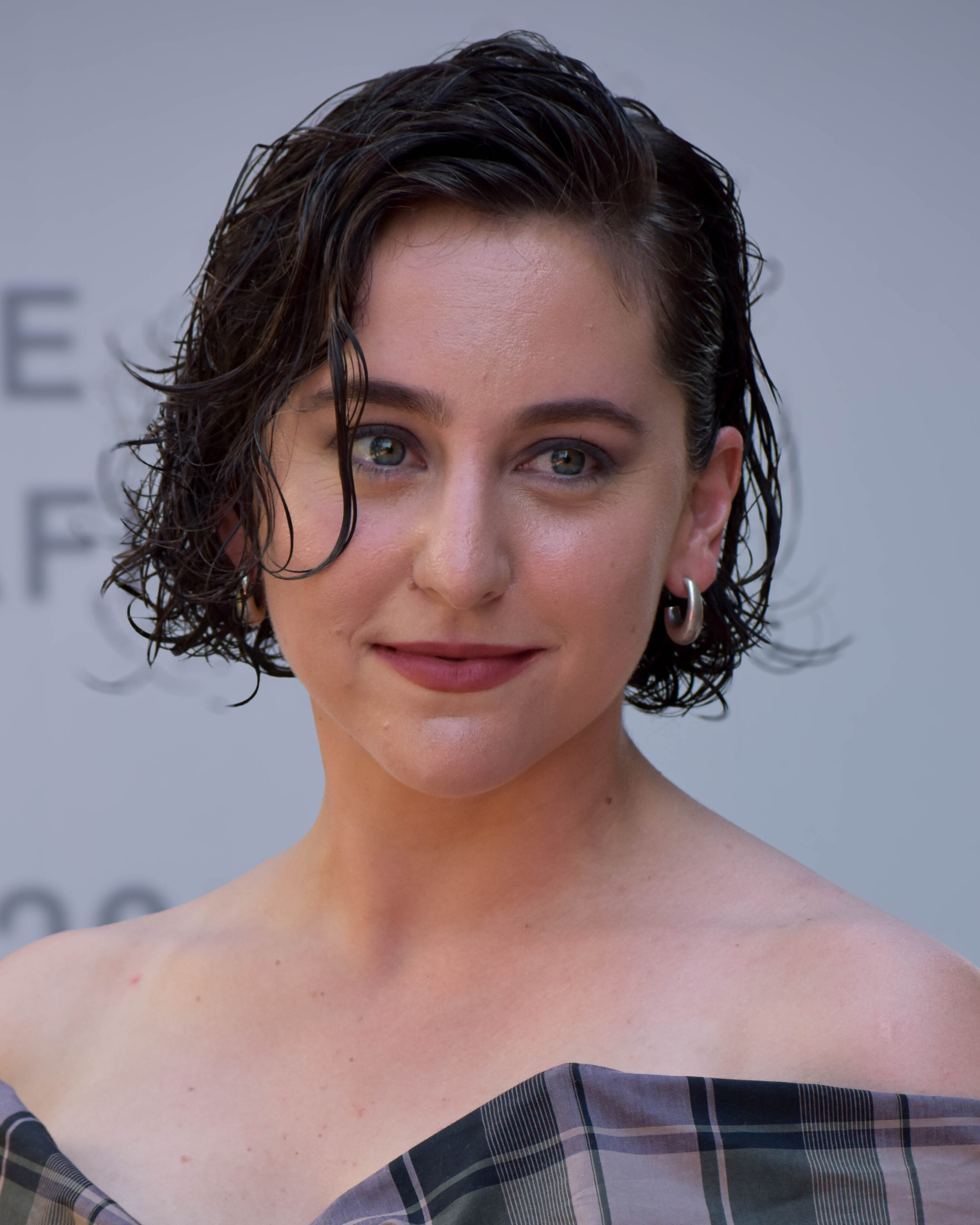
- Friedland at 81st Venice Film Festival in 2024
- Born: 1992 (age 33–34)
- Citizenship: United States
- Education: Brown University
- Occupation: Film director
- Notable work: Familiar Touch
- Website: https://motionandpictures.com/

Sarah Friedland (born 1992) is an American director and choreographer. Her 2024 debut feature film, Familiar Touch, premiered at the 81st Venice International Film Festival, where she won the Orizzonti section's Best Director award and the film won the Luigi de Laurentis Lion of the Future Award for best debut feature.

== Early life ==
Friedland was born in California, to an Ashkenazi Jewish family, with her parents coming from "mixed class identities and divergent interpretations of Jewish identity." She describes her background as a "twin sister that comes from former-hippie-turned-bourgeois, left-wing, Californian, Jewish educators."

== Career ==
Friedland is a graduate of Brown University's department of Modern Culture and Media and started her career assisting filmmakers, with a minor in dance. She graduated in 2014. She describes herself as "working at the intersection of moving images and moving bodies". She explains that to elucidate and revise the embodied patterns of social life and the body politic, she writes and stages bodies and cameras in concert with one another "through hybrid, experimental, and movement-based filmmaking, multichannel video installation, and site-specific live dance performance."

In 2014 she choreographed a live dance performance, "After the Multiplex", after which she continued to incorporate live and experimental dance into her films. Between the years 2017–2022, she created a trilogy, Movement Exercises, consisting of three short films that explore movement in different contexts, especially how they can become dance, and how they are coded with social and political meaning. Through techniques of embodied interviewing, pre- and reenactment adaptation, and improvisational play, she facilitates a research process that incorporates found movements, gestures, and postures from embodied memories, film, and archival footage. Friedland creates dances with a diverse range of performers and movers, including professional dancers, as well as cohorts of older adults and teenagers. The first short film in this trilogy, Home Exercises, adapts the form of the home workout video. It investigates and frames the gestural habits and choreographies of eight older adults in their homes. The second short film, Drills, a reimagining of the Cold War-era US government-produced social guidance film, explores the choreographies of future preparedness, ranging from office meditation to lockdown and Boy Scout drills. The final installment, Trust Exercises, explores the conflict between the poetics of the group movement and its instrumentalization for capitalist management by altering the choreography of team-building exercises and the visual grammar of corporate videos. Her work has been screened in numerous film festivals, including New York, New Orleans, Oberhausen, Ann Arbor, and even in dance spaces, including the American Dance Festival and Dixon Place. From 2021-2022, she was both a Pina Bausch Fellow for Choreography and a NYSCA/NYFA Fellow in Film/Video. In 2023, she was featured as one of "25 New Faces of Independent Film" in Filmmaker Magazine. Movement Exercises is distributed by Video Data Bank. Friedland has collaborated on research and writing projects with media theorists Wendy Chun on new media leaks and slut-shaming, Erin Brannigan on the dancing body in cinema, and Tess Takahashi, a writer, scholar, and programmer, on masses and embodiment. She has worked in creative aging for seven years, facilitating intergenerational filmmaking projects and teaching in older adult communities. She is a teaching artist who works with people of all ages. She has taught workshops on choreographic practices in filmmaking at universities like Brown, Yale, Skidmore, and Reed, among many others.

Her 2024 feature film, Familiar Touch, had its world premiere at the 81st Venice International Film Festival on September 3, 2024, in the Orizzonti (Horizons) section, where Friedland won the Luigi de Laurentiis prize for best first film, alongside the Best Director award. Lead Kathleen Chalfant won the Best Actress award. In her acceptance speech for the debut award, Friedland made a statement, saying: “As a Jewish American artist working in a time-based medium, I must note, I'm accepting this award on the 336th day of Israel's genocide in Gaza and 76th year of occupation. I believe it is our responsibility as filmmakers to use the institutional platforms through which we work to redress Israel's impunity on the global stage. I stand in solidarity with the people of Palestine and their struggle for liberation.”

In Familiar Touch, an elderly woman navigates her relationships with her family, caregivers, and herself as she transitions into supported living, while her memories and desires shift. To make the film, Friedland set up a workshop at a care facility in Pasadena, Villa Gardens. Residents made their own biographical films, and only after everyone had been immersed in the experience, they became cast and crew in the feature. Although the film is about dementia, Friedland did not film the residents in the community's memory care wing due to ethical considerations about their ability to give consent, so some roles (including the lead) were played by professional actors.

== Works ==
| Year | Title | Comments |
|---|---|---|
| 2016 | "Swimminghole" | Music video |
| 2016 | Hide and Seek | Short Film (Writer, Editor, Producer, Director) |
| 2018 | Home Exercises | Hybrid documentary/experimental short film (Writer, Editor, Producer, Director |
| 2019 | Crowds | 3-channel video installation (Editor, Producer, Director, Choreographer) |
| 2020 | Drills | Hybrid documentary/experimental short film (Editor, Producer, Director) |
| 2022 | Trust Exercises | Hybrid documentary/experimental short film (Director) |
| 2022 | A Body | 2-channel video installation, collaboration with Eiko Otake |
| 2024 | Social Guidance | 4-channel video installation with archival materials |
| 2024 | Familiar Touch | Feature (Writer, Producer, Director) |

== Awards ==
- 2024 Winner Luigi De Laurentiis Award for Best Debut Film (Familiar Touch)
- 2024 Nominee Venice Horizons Award for Best Film (Familiar Touch)
- 2024 Winner Venice Horizons Award for Best Director (Familiar Touch)
- 2025 Winner Film Independent Spirit Someone to Watch Award (Familiar Touch)
