= Familiar Touch =

American drama film

- Theatrical release poster
- Directed by: Sarah Friedland
- Written by: Sarah Friedland
- Produced by: Alexandra Byer; Matthew Thurm; Sarah Friedland
- Starring: Kathleen Chalfant; Carolyn Michelle Smith; Andy McQueen; H. Jon Benjamin
- Cinematography: Gabe C. Elder
- Edited by: Kate Abernathy; Aacharee Ungsriwong
- Production companies: Rathaus Films; Go for Thurm; Memento International; Artemis Rising Foundation; Simbelle Productions
- Distributed by: Music Box Films
- Release dates: September 3, 2024 (Venice); June 20, 2025 (United States)
- Running time: 92 minutes
- Country: United States
- Language: English
- Box office: $691,298

Familiar Touch is a 2024 American drama film, written and directed by Sarah Friedland. It stars Kathleen Chalfant, Carolyn Michelle Smith, Andy McQueen and H. Jon Benjamin.

Familiar Touch had its world premiere at the 81st Venice International Film Festival on September 3, 2024, where it won the Lion of the Future, and the Orizzonti section Best Director and Best Actress prizes. It was released in the United States on June 20, 2025, by Music Box Films, to critical acclaim.

== Premise ==
Billed as a coming of (old) age film, Familiar Touch follows an octogenarian woman (Kathleen Chalfant) as she transitions to life in assisted living contending with her relationship to herself and her caregivers while dealing with cognitive decline.

== Cast ==
- Kathleen Chalfant as Ruth
- Carolyn Michelle Smith as Vanessa
- Andy McQueen as Brian
- H. Jon Benjamin as Steve

== Production ==
Principal photography took place at the Villa Gardens retirement community in Pasadena, California, with residents participating in a filmmaking workshop and acting in the film. Residents made their own biographical films, and only after everyone had been immersed in the experience, they became cast and crew in the feature. Although the film is about dementia, Friedland did not film the residents in the community's memory care wing, due to ethical considerations about their ability to give consent, so some roles (including the lead) were played by professional actors.

== Release & awards ==
Familiar Touch had its world premiere at the 81st Venice International Film Festival on September 3, 2024.

In December 2024, Music Box Films acquired distribution rights to the film. It was released on June 20, 2025.

== Reception ==
=== Critical reception ===
On the review aggregator website Rotten Tomatoes, 98% of 54 critics' reviews are positive. Metacritic, which uses a weighted average, assigned the film a score of 87 out of 100 based on 21 critics, indicating "universal acclaim".

=== Accolades ===
At the 81st Venice International Film Festival, the film won the Luigi De Laurentis Award for a Debut Film, as well as Best Director and Best Actress in the Orizzonti section. In her acceptance speech for the first award, Friedland made a political statement, saying: "As a Jewish American artist working in a time-based medium, I must note, I'm accepting this award on the 336th day of Israel's genocide in Gaza and 76th year of occupation. I believe it is our responsibility as film workers to use the institutional platforms through which we work to redress Israel's impunity on the global stage. I stand in solidarity with the people of Palestine and their struggle for liberation."

At the 35th Annual Gotham Film Awards, the film was nominated for Best Feature and Breakthrough Director.

At the 40th Independent Spirit Awards, the film won the Someone to Watch Award. It was also eligible to compete in the following year's ceremony, where it was nominated for Best Lead Performance and the John Cassavetes Award.
