= Robert Kaplow =

American novelist

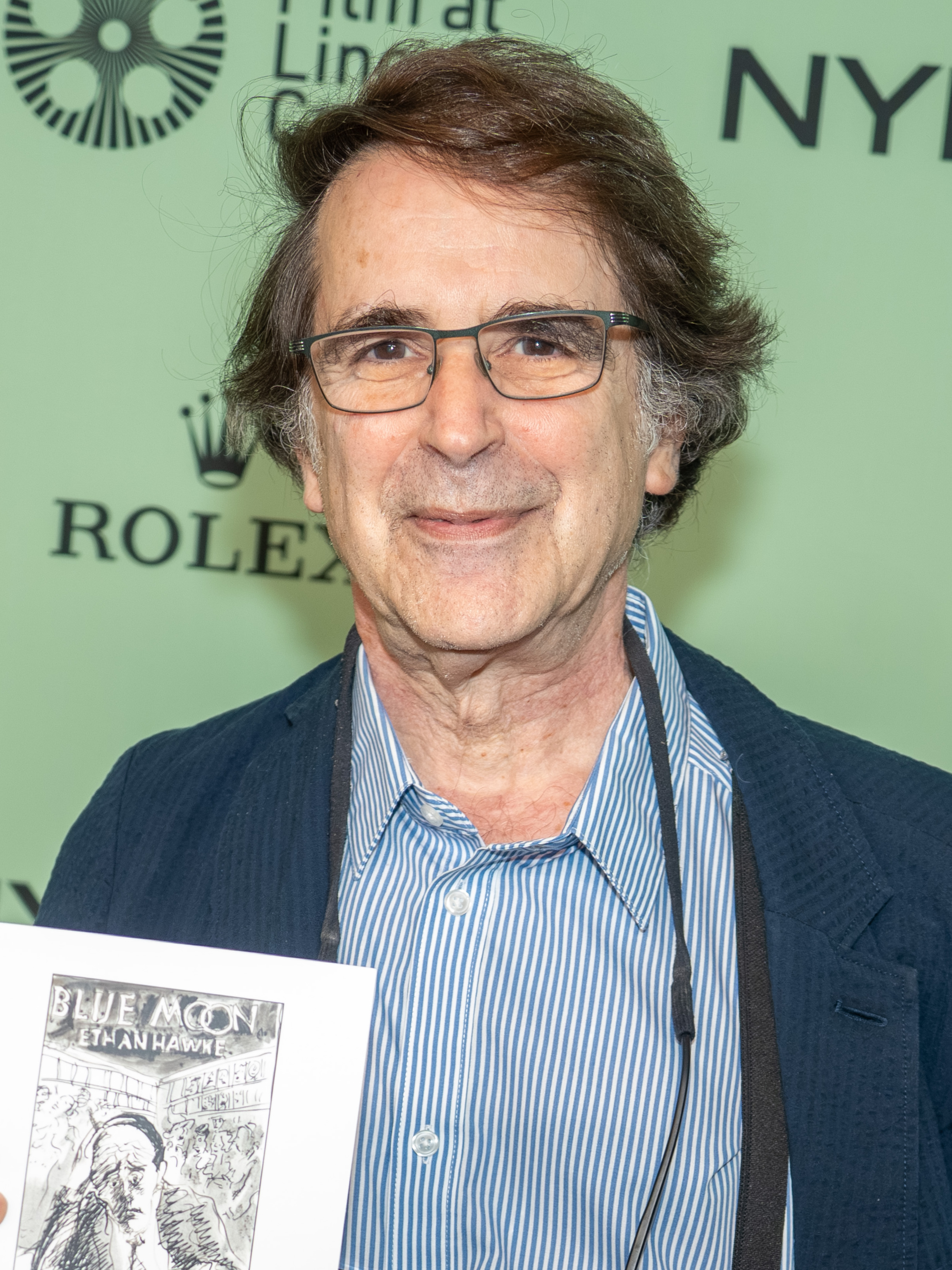
- Kaplow at the 2025 New York Film Festival
- Born: May 30, 1954 (age 72); New Jersey, U.S.
- Education: Rutgers University
- Occupations: Novelist; teacher; screenwriter
- Writing career
- Genre: Coming of age novel
- Notable work: Me and Orson Welles
- Website: robertkaplow.com

Robert Kaplow (born May 30, 1954) is an American writer, comedian, and teacher. His coming-of-age novel was made into the film Me and Orson Welles. The story is about "youthful creative ambition" and received positive reviews from The New York Times, which described it as "nimble, likable and smart." Kaplow has written nine books and previously taught English language and film studies at Summit High School in New Jersey. He has also written and performed comedy for NPR and was the screenwriter of the 2025 film Blue Moon, for which he received a nomination for Best Original Screenplay at the 98th Academy Awards.

== Background ==
Kaplow was born to a Jewish family in New Jersey on May 30, 1954. He graduated in 1972 from Westfield High School in Westfield, New Jersey, where he wrote his first satirical sketches as a student.

One of Kaplow's later novels is sprinkled with references to Westfield. "Westfield remains for me the geography of my youth. I'm still very drawn to the place, though I don't live there," Kaplow said in 2009.

He graduated from Rutgers University, the state university of New Jersey. He became a teacher at Summit High School, working there for over thirty years before retiring in 2014.

== Writing career ==
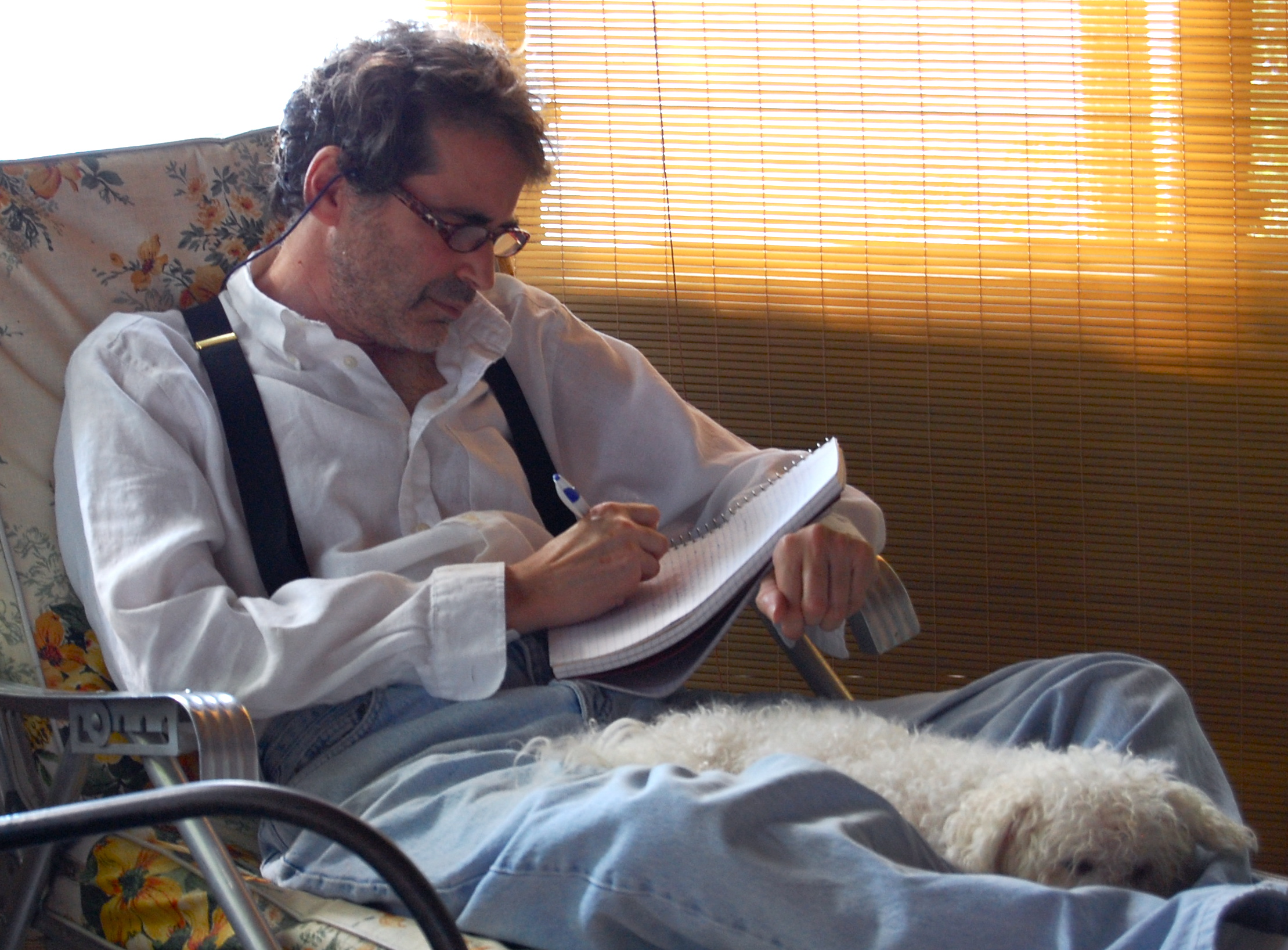
Kaplow in 2011

Kaplow conceived the idea for Me and Orson Welles while a student at Rutgers University. He saw a photo in the periodical Theatre Arts Monthly from 1937 with Orson Welles with a young man. Kaplow wondered what the young man might have been thinking. He wrote the story, but it took about nine years to find a publisher. It was made into a film by director Richard Linklater which was released in 2009. The Guardian critic Sophie Martelli described the film as a "schmaltzy yet charming coming-of-age story." Me and Orson Welles was a New York Times bestseller and the film in 2008 starred Zac Efron and Claire Danes. The movie was filmed in the Gaiety Theatre on the Isle of Man.

Kaplow's subsequent novel is a satire of writers, critics, and publishers.

For National Public Radio's Morning Edition, Kaplow created "Moe Moskowitz and the Punsters," a series of musical and satirical pop-culture parodies. These musical parodies were released on two CDs: Steven Spielberg, Give Me Some of Your Money and Cancel My Subscription: The Worst of NPR. Kaplow was fired from NPR on three occasions, the first because of concerns that the Moe Moskowitz character was a Jewish stereotype, the second over the perceived quality of the segment's humor, and the third because Cancel My Subscription's CD release featured an unlicensed use of the NPR logo.

Kaplow wrote the screenplay for Linklater's 2025 film Blue Moon., for which he received an Academy Award nomination for Best Original Screenplay.

== Personal life ==
As of 2025, Kaplow is a longtime resident of Metuchen, New Jersey.

=== The Watcher ===
The 2022 Netflix show The Watcher, based on a real-life incident that occurred in Kaplow's hometown of Westfield, features a character loosely based on Kaplow named Roger Kaplan, portrayed by Michael Nouri, who is presented as a suspect of being the author of the mysterious letters. Kaplow became associated with the case during his time as a teacher, when he told students that he had written a number of letters to a residence in Westfield, as opposed to anyone who lived in the house. There is no known actual connection between Kaplow and "The Watcher", and Kaplow said in 2022 that the letters he wrote were to a different house in which he eventually befriended the residents.

== Works ==
=== Bibliography ===
- Alex Icicle: A Romance in Ten Torrid Chapters, the comic rant of an over-educated and under-loved eighth-grader obsessively in love with a girl who doesn't know he's alive
- Alessandra in Love, a comic tale about the romantic tribulations of a sardonic and intelligent high school junior
- The Cat Who Killed Lillian Jackson Braun: A Parody, satirizing the books of Lilian Jackson Braun and the mystery genre
- Me and Orson Welles: A Novel (2003), a romantic coming-of-age story set in 1937 around the founding of Orson Welles' Mercury Theatre
- Who's Killing the Great Writers of America? (2007), a satirical murder mystery. After Sue Grafton, Danielle Steel, Curtis Sittenfeld, and Tom Clancy all are murdered, Stephen King hunts for their killer
- Playland: A Slightly Subversive Love Story (2022), the tale of a teenage couple attempting to navigate a life together in New York in the summer of 1972
- The Lifers (2022), a novel about teachers

=== Screenplay ===
- Blue Moon (2025)
