= Camden Monarchs =

American basketball team

- Founded: 2019
- League: American Basketball Association
- Region: Northeast Region
- Based in: Camden, New Jersey
- Colors: Purple, gold
- Owner: Giovonni Thompson
- Head coach: Stan Laws
- General manager: Joe Richmond

Camden Monarchs is an American semi professional basketball team based in Camden, New Jersey. The team is a member of the American Basketball Association. Darrin Akers & Giovonni Thompson are the founders of Camden Monarchs. Thompson is the CEO of GioGlobal Management and has clients who have worked with Beyonce, Michael Jackson, Microsoft, The NBA and Sony. She is also Founder of The Love & Basketball Tea, an annual empowerment event for young girls over the NBA All Star Weekend.

== History ==
The Camden Monarchs have been added to the record-setting expansion for season 2019–2020 in American Basketball Association (ABA) and it is making Giovonni Thompson, the youngest African-American female owner in the leagues history. She brought professional basketball team to Camden, New Jersey, and founded Camden Monarchs in 2019.

== Noted players ==
- Lenny Cooke joined the Camden Monarchs, an expansion team of the ABA. Cooke discussed his decision to join the Camden Monarchs on an appearance on ESPN Radio and in a podcast interview with Brandon 'Scoop B' Robinson along with the team’s CEO, Giovanni Thompson. Lenny Cooke is the subject of the 2013 documentary Lenny Cooke, which documents his rise, fall, and subsequent life after basketball. The film, made by the Safdie Brothers and the film was entered in the 2013 Tribeca Film Festival.
- Rysheed Jordan, A Vaux high school basketball star in Pennsylvania, also known as The Prince of North Philly has signed the semi-professional basketball team Camden Monarchs, of the ABA League. The ABA's 2020–2021 season has been canceled due to the coronavirus pandemic.

== Season-by-season record ==
Season	W	L	Result
2019-2020	16	3	#3 Northeast Division - ABA Standings
