= Buddy Duress =

American actor (1985–2023)

- Born: Michael Constantine Stathis; May 21, 1985; Queens, New York City, U.S.
- Died: November 2023 (aged 38); Queens, New York City, U.S.
- Occupation: Actor
- Years active: 2014–2023

Michael Constantine Stathis (May 21, 1985 – November 2023), known by his screen name Buddy Duress, was an American actor best known for his roles in the Safdie brothers films Heaven Knows What (2014) and Good Time (2017).

== Early life ==
Duress was born Michael Constantine Stathis on May 21, 1985, in the New York City borough of Queens. He was of Greek and Italian descent. Following his parents' divorce, he was raised in New Jersey by his father, but suffered physical abuse and eventually went to live with his mother and brother in Queens when he was a teenager.

== Acting career ==
Stathis had a history of legal troubles, having been locked up in New York City's Rikers Island at least ten times over the course of his life, with charges including heroin possession and identity theft. In 2013, he was supposed to leave Rikers for an in-patient program for individuals with drug addiction issues, but instead fled and spent almost a year homeless, on the run from the authorities. It was during this time that he made the acquaintance of Arielle Holmes, the star of Heaven Knows What, who recommended him to Josh Safdie for a role in the film. He adopted the stage name Buddy Duress. He was apprehended by the police shortly after filming ended, but resumed acting following his release.

Duress appeared in the Safdie brothers's subsequent film, Good Time (2017). He amassed several other film credits, but continued to have run-ins with the law, and was arrested multiple times in 2019. As a result, he was unable to appear in the Safdies' subsequent film, Uncut Gems.

== Death ==
Duress died at his residence in Astoria, Queens, in November 2023 at the age of 38; The New York Times reported that his cause of death was "cardiac arrest caused by a 'drug cocktail' including heroin." His death was publicly announced in February 2024 by Duress’s brother Christopher Stathis.

== Filmography ==
=== Film ===
Year	Title	Role	Notes
2014	Heaven Knows What	Mike	
2017	Person to Person	Paul	
2017	Good Time	Ray	
2018	86'd	Max	Short film
2018	The Mountain	Philip Farmer	Uncredited
2018	The Great Darkened Days	Concurrent	
2020	Beware of Dog	Mike	
2020	Skull	Brick Bat	Short film (unreleased)
2021	PVT Chat	Larry	
2021	Flinch	James Vaughn	
2022	Funny Pages	Ryan	Cameo
2025	Mass State Lottery	Ivan and Church	Posthumous release

=== Television ===
Year	Title	Role	Notes
2016	Rachel Dratch's Late Night Snack	Stoney	Episode #1.11
