= Good Time (film) =

2017 film by the Safdie brothers

- Theatrical release poster
- Directed by: Josh Safdie; Benny Safdie
- Written by: Ronald Bronstein; Josh Safdie
- Produced by: Paris Kasidokostas-Latsis; Terry Dougas; Oscar Boyson; Sebastian Bear-McClard
- Starring: Robert Pattinson; Benny Safdie; Buddy Duress; Taliah Lennice Webster; Jennifer Jason Leigh; Barkhad Abdi
- Cinematography: Sean Price Williams
- Edited by: Ronald Bronstein; Benny Safdie
- Music by: Oneohtrix Point Never
- Production companies: Rhea Films; Elara Pictures; Hercules Film Fund
- Distributed by: A24
- Release dates: May 25, 2017 (Cannes); August 11, 2017 (United States)
- Running time: 101 minutes
- Country: United States
- Language: English
- Budget: $2 million
- Box office: $4.1 million

Good Time is a 2017 American crime thriller film directed by Josh and Benny Safdie and written by Josh Safdie and Ronald Bronstein. It stars Robert Pattinson as a small-time criminal who tries to free his developmentally disabled brother, played by Benny Safdie, from police custody, while attempting to avoid his own arrest. Buddy Duress, Taliah Lennice Webster, Jennifer Jason Leigh, and Barkhad Abdi co-star. Electronic musician Oneohtrix Point Never composed the film's score.

Good Time was selected to compete for the Palme d'Or in the main competition section of the 2017 Cannes Film Festival on May 25, 2017. The film was released in select theaters on August 11, 2017, before expanding wide on August 25. It received highly positive reviews from critics, with praise for Pattinson's performance, the direction, the story, and the music.

== Plot ==
In New York City, Nick Nikas struggles with a court-ordered therapy session in which Peter, a psychiatrist, attempts to determine the extent of his cognitive and social impairment, touching upon a violent incident with his grandmother. Nick's brother Connie pulls him out of the session. The brothers rob a bank, but a dye pack in the bag of money explodes, causing their getaway driver to crash, and Connie and Nick flee on foot. Although they manage to remove the dye from their clothes, a police officer finds them suspicious and attempts to question them, and Nick runs. He is arrested and sent to Rikers Island, while Connie escapes.

That night, Connie attempts to secure a bail bond to get Nick out of jail. Most of the money from the robbery was destroyed by the dye, but he convinces his girlfriend Corey to pay the remaining $10,000 with her mother's credit card, only to discover her mother has canceled it. When Connie learns a fight with another inmate has already put Nick in the hospital, he leaves Corey and goes there to free him. He finds an unconscious and bandaged patient guarded by a police officer, and sneaks him onto an Access-A-Ride bus. He tricks Annie, one of the other riders, into letting them wait in her house until morning. Connie watches TV with Crystal, Annie's 16-year-old granddaughter. When his mug shot appears on the news, he kisses her as a distraction. They are interrupted by the sounds of the patient regaining consciousness, and Connie discovers he did not break Nick out of the hospital, but rather a different criminal: a recently paroled drug dealer named Ray.

Connie tells Crystal he wants to borrow Annie's car to take Ray home. On the way, Ray recounts the story of the day leading up to his arrest and hospitalization. He tells Connie about a bottle of LSD solution and bag of stolen money Ray's friends ditched in a haunted house ride in Adventureland while they were running from police. Connie deduces that the drugs and money are still there and he, Crystal, and Ray drive to Adventureland. Leaving Crystal in the car, Connie and Ray search for the money, but only find the LSD. They are caught by Dash, Adventureland's security guard, who says the police are on their way. Connie beats Dash unconscious and, when a police car arrives, steals Dash's uniform. Ray pours LSD down Dash's throat, and Connie convinces the officers that Dash is the intruder. Crystal is arrested when she gets out of Annie's car, and Connie watches the police take her away.

Unable to find the money, Connie and Ray go to Dash's apartment, where Connie befriends Dash's pit bull by letting it smell Dash's jacket. Ray calls his friend Caliph to offer to sell back the LSD, and, while they wait for Caliph and the sun rises, Ray begins drinking. Connie tells Ray that he is a leech on society, and they have a heated argument. Caliph arrives without any money, and Connie, protected by the dog, tells him to come back with $15,000. Although Caliph agrees, he tells Ray that he is really going to get a gun.

Sensing danger, Connie attempts to leave with the acid before Caliph returns. Ray attacks him in the hallway and tries to get the drugs, but Dash's dog attacks Ray. Connie gets away and Ray escapes into the apartment, where he looks out the window and sees Connie get caught by the police, dropping the LSD in the process. There is a pounding at the door, and Ray attempts to reach a neighboring apartment by climbing out a window, but he slips. As Connie is being put in a police car, he witnesses Ray fall to his death.

Later, Peter greets Nick and Nick's grandmother in a lobby. While he walks Nick back to join a class, Peter remarks that Connie did the "right thing", and both brothers are where they belong. Peter comforts Nick, telling him he will have a "good time". Nick is initially very uncomfortable, but he gradually begins to participate in the group activity.

== Cast ==
- Robert Pattinson as Constantine "Connie" Nikas, Nick's older brother and Corey's much younger boyfriend
- Benny Safdie as Nikolas "Nick" Nikas, Connie's younger brother, who has a developmental disability
- Buddy Duress as Ray, a criminal recently released on parole
- Taliah Lennice Webster as Crystal, a teenager who helps Connie
- Jennifer Jason Leigh as Corey Ellman, Connie's much older girlfriend
- Barkhad Abdi as Dash, the Park Security Guard
- Necro as Caliph, Ray's friend, who is also a criminal
- Peter Verby as Peter, the Psychiatrist
- Saida Mansoor as Agapia Nikas, Connie and Nick's grandmother
- Gladys Mathon as Annie, Crystal's grandmother
- Rose Gregorio as Loren Ellman, Corey's mother
- Eric Paykert as Eric, the bail bondsman
- Astrid Corrales as Bail Bondsman's Assistant
- Rachel Black as Rachel, the public defender
- Hirakish Ranasaki as Trevor, Caliph's friend, who deals acid
- Maynard Nicholl as Donnie, who robbed a RadioShack
- Ben Edelman as Acid Buying Complainer
- Robert Clohessy as 6th (credited as 7th) Floor Elmhurst Police Officer
- Craig muMs Grant as Denny, the Access-A-Ride Driver
- Souléymane Sy Savané as African Cab Driver
- Dorothi Fox as Elderly Woman in Hospital
- Evonne Walton as Bank Teller

== Production ==
=== Development & pre-production ===
On July 9, 2015, it was announced that Josh and Benny Safdie were set to direct a caper film called Good Time, and that Robert Pattinson was attached to star. Sebastian Bear-McClard and Oscar Boyson of Elara Pictures produced the film, which Pattinson described as a "really hardcore kind of Queens, New York, mentally damaged psychopath, bank robbery movie."

The project came about because Robert Pattinson approached the directors after seeing a still of their film Heaven Knows What and admired their unique approach to filmmaking. Pattinson said of the still, "It was on the banner of some website, just of Arielle’s face; she just has an amazing expression on her face. I liked the sensibility of it." The directors trusted Pattinson's commitment and decided they wanted to create a "piece of pulp" with him, partially inspired by what Josh was reading at the time (The Executioner’s Song and In the Belly of the Beast). Josh Safdie got together with Ronald Bronstein, and together they wrote the script specifically for Pattinson. An early iteration of the film was a prison break movie, but it eventually evolved into a more of a caper.

Josh and Benny Safdie have named several films as inspiration for Good Time including Jackie Brown, The Running Man, After Hours, 48 Hrs., Law and Order, Heat, Jackson County Jail, One Year in a Life of Crime, Lock-Up: The Prisoners of Rikers Island, Short Eyes, and Miami Blues (all of which they screened at Metrograph in New York City for a series called "Now: Films That Inspired the Safdie Brothers' Good Time").

While researching for the character of Connie, Josh would sit in on arraignments at the New York City criminal courthouse at 100 Centre Street. He also discovered an old book called Disguise Techniques which helped inform the wardrobe for the movie.

=== Casting ===
For the character of Nick, the Safdie brothers originally considered casting an actor with a real disability, but worried that the filming environment wouldn't be appropriate. Josh Safdie said, "We were very far along in that process and we were interviewing a lot of people…but we ended up…looking at our schedule, which was very aggressive, and a lot of scenes that called for intricate blocking and action set pieces—because this is, in the end, an action movie.…We realized that [the actor] wouldn't have much agency in those scenes, we'd be pushing them around and manipulating, and that morally crossed a line for us." Benny ended up taking on the role himself. In order to convince the skeptical financers of the film that he was right for the part, he made an audition tape in character as Nick. He put on weight for the role and developed a way of speaking with his tongue held back.

Many roles were played by first-time actors, something the Safdie brothers' films are known for, with street casting for this film led by Eleonore Hendricks. The bail bondsman was played by the proprietor of American Liberty Bail Bonds, in Kew Gardens, Queens. Peter Verby, who plays the therapist in the film, is a criminal defense lawyer in real life and represented Josh Safdie after filming wrapped. Initially, Eric Roberts was cast as the bail bondsman. However, after the Safdies edited the scene, they felt having a known actor in the part gave it an artifice that was inappropriate for the film. So they re-shot the sequence with Eric Paykert, who is a real life bail bondsman. Taliah Webster, who plays Crystal, was cast after showing up to an open casting call where 600 other girls showed up. Benny Safdie said, "Taliah really just had such an incredible story that was very similar to the script, but she had such a toughness and humor to her that it would make everything deeper. We kept bringing her back for call-backs and did a ton of improv scenarios with her and she thrived in all of them. It wasn’t till she met Rob (Pattinson) that we knew it was official.…After she left that meeting I was told she was a huge Twilight fan and she had hid it from all of us! Now we really knew she could act."

=== Filming ===
Principal photography for the film took place in New York City in February and March 2016. One scene is shot in the New World Mall, in Flushing, where the Safdies had permission to shoot, but they showed up without warning and shot with mostly hidden cameras.

The final scene was shot with the Epic Players, a nonprofit theatre company that seeks to shine a light on neurodivergent talent. The directors decided not to disclose that Benny, playing Nick, was an actor, "for the fear that it would be too distracting", so he stayed in character the whole day, for 17 hours.

During filming, Josh was arrested. He said, "[It is a] long, stupid story where the cops thought I was dealing drugs out of a super-shady car (the car was shady as fuck).…It resulted in me getting sick in a cold cell and shooting on little sleep the next day."

Also during filming, actor and former felon Buddy Duress was under the influence of drugs on set and spontaneously exposed his genitalia to a seventeen-year-old first-time actress who was portraying a prostitute. The Safdies claim to have not been aware of her age, and the scene was cut from the film.

=== Music ===
Oneohtrix Point Never provided the film's score, which won the Soundtrack Award at the 2017 Cannes Film Festival. His work for the film included a collaboration with singer Iggy Pop, "The Pure and the Damned", which was used in a trailer and played over the film's end credits. The score was released as Oneohtrix Point Never's eighth studio album in August 2017.

The Safdie brothers directed a music video for "The Pure and the Damned", which featured Pattinson and Benny Safdie reprising their roles as Connie and Nick, respectively, as well as a computer-generated stand-in for Iggy Pop.

== Release ==
In October 2016, A24 acquired the film's distribution rights. It was selected to compete for the Palme d'Or in the main competition section of the 2017 Cannes Film Festival. The film began a limited theatrical release in the U.S. on August 11, 2017, and expanded wide on August 25, 2017.

== Reception ==
=== Critical response ===
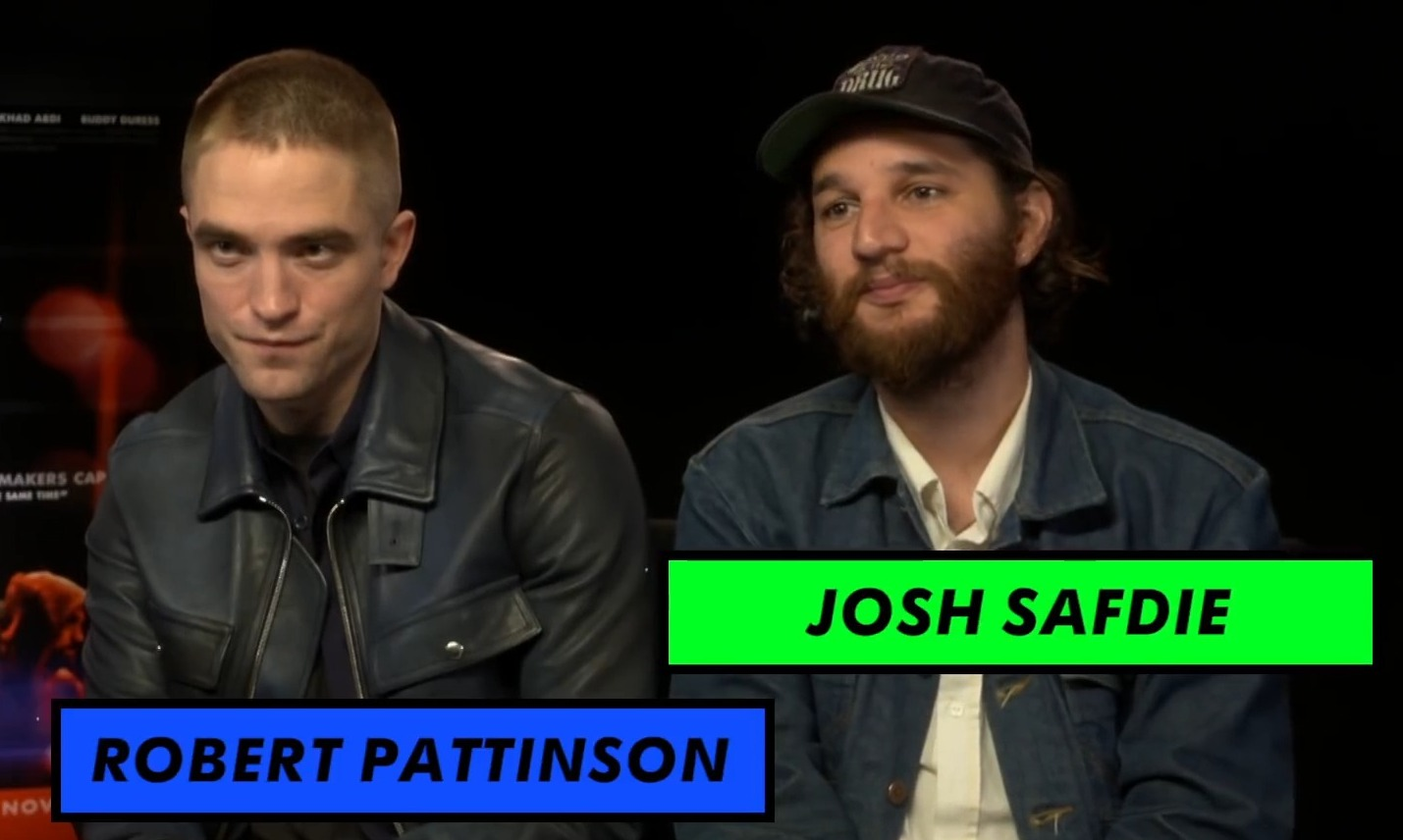
Robert Pattinson and co-director Josh Safdie during the film's 2017 press run.

On review aggregator website Rotten Tomatoes, the film has an approval rating of 91% based on 239 reviews, with an average rating of 7.6/10; the website's critical consensus reads: "A visual treat filled out by consistently stellar work from Robert Pattinson, Good Time is a singularly distinctive crime drama offering far more than the usual genre thrills." On Metacritic, the film has a weighted average score of 80 out of 100 based on 41 critics, indicating "generally favorable" reviews.

Richard Brody of The New Yorker gave the film a glowing review, calling it "an instant crime classic in the age of Trump", and awarding specific praise to Pattinson's performance, as well as the Safdies' direction and Sean Price Williams' cinematography. David Rooney of The Hollywood Reporter gave the film a positive review, writing: "Led by Robert Pattinson giving arguably his most commanding performance to date as a desperate bank robber cut from the same cloth as Al Pacino's Sonny Wortzik in Dog Day Afternoon, this is a richly textured genre piece that packs a visceral charge in its restless widescreen visuals and adrenalizing music, which recalls the great mood-shaping movie scores of Tangerine Dream."

Guy Lodge of Variety also gave the film a positive review, and said that "Robert Pattinson hits a career high in Benny and Josh Safdie's nervy, vivid heist thriller, which merges messy humanity with tight genre mechanics." The Economist praised Pattinson's performance, saying it "establishes him as a capable character actor". Emily Yoshida of Vulture wrote: "For all its throttling thrills, Good Time is a film about a destructive love—and loving someone despite not having the right kind of love to give them. Ignore the deceptively convivial title: This is the kind of thrill that sticks."

Conversely, Rex Reed of The New York Observer criticized the film, calling it "just under two hours of pointless toxicity," populated by brainless characters, filled with ludicrous writing, and laced with mostly over-the-top acting. He called the characters "so contrived that the movie defies even the most basic logic", and wrote that, "At best, it's a frenetic, disjointed and totally surreal look at people in crisis, seen through the eyes of other people in crisis. It all takes place in one night, but it seems to last days." Likewise, A. O. Scott of The New York Times said: "Sometimes it flaunts its clichés—Nick's disability, and Benny Safdie's slack-jawed portrayal of it, is a big one—and other times it cloaks them in rough visual textures and jumpy, bumpy camera movements, so that a rickety genre thrill ride feels like something daring and new. It isn't. It's stale, empty and cold."

=== Accolades ===
Award	Date of ceremony	Category	Recipient(s) and nominee(s)	Result	Ref.
Cannes Film Festival	May 17–28, 2017	Palme d'Or	Safdie brothers	Nominated	
Cannes Film Festival	May 17–28, 2017	Cannes Soundtrack Award	Oneohtrix Point Never	Won	
Hollywood Music in Media Awards	November 17, 2017	Original Score – Feature Film	Oneohtrix Point Never	Won	
Hollywood Music in Media Awards	November 17, 2017	Soundtrack Album	Good Time	Nominated	
Gotham Independent Film Awards	November 27, 2017	Best Feature	Good Time	Nominated	
Gotham Independent Film Awards	November 27, 2017	Best Actor	Robert Pattinson	Nominated	
Detroit Film Critics Society	December 8, 2017	Best Actor	Robert Pattinson	Nominated	
Detroit Film Critics Society	December 8, 2017	Best Use of Music	Oneohtrix Point Never	Nominated	
Boston Online Film Critics Association	December 9, 2017	Best Film	Good Time	10th Place	
Online Film Critics Society	December 12, 2017	Best Editing	Ronald Bronstein and Benny Safdie	Nominated	
Online Film Critics Society	December 12, 2017	Best Actor	Robert Pattinson	Nominated	
San Diego Film Critics Society	December 12, 2017	Best Actor	Robert Pattinson	Nominated	
Dublin Film Critics' Circle	December 13, 2017	Best Actor	Robert Pattinson	3rd Place	
Seattle Film Critics Society	December 18, 2017	Best Actor in a Leading Role	Robert Pattinson	Nominated	
Indiewire Critics' Poll	December 19, 2017	Best Actor	Robert Pattinson	3rd Place	
Florida Film Critics Circle	December 23, 2017	Best Actor	Robert Pattinson	Nominated	
North Texas Film Critics Association	December 20, 2017	Best Actor	Robert Pattinson	Nominated	
Houston Film Critics Society	January 6, 2018	Best Actor	Robert Pattinson	Nominated	
Austin Film Critics Association	January 8, 2018	Best Actor	Robert Pattinson	Nominated	
Evening Standard British Film Awards	February 8, 2018	Best Actor	Robert Pattinson	Nominated	
Satellite Awards	February 10, 2018	Best Actor	Robert Pattinson	Nominated	
Independent Spirit Awards	March 3, 2018	Best Male Lead	Robert Pattinson	Nominated	
Independent Spirit Awards	March 3, 2018	Best Director	Safdie Brothers	Nominated	
Independent Spirit Awards	March 3, 2018	Best Supporting Male	Benny Safdie	Nominated	
Independent Spirit Awards	March 3, 2018	Best Supporting Female	Taliah Lennice Webster	Nominated	
Independent Spirit Awards	March 3, 2018	Best Editing	Ronald Bronstein and Benny Safdie	Nominated	
