= Brooklyn Kings =

- League: USBL 1999–2007
- Founded: 1999
- History: Brooklyn Kings (1999–2007)
- Arena: Schwartz Athletic Center
- Location: Brooklyn, New York
- Team colors: Black, white, gold
- Ownership: Brooklyn Kings Basketball Club, LLC
- Website: thebrooklynkings.com

The Brooklyn Kings were a United States Basketball League franchise in Brooklyn, New York. They played in Downtown Brooklyn, on the main campus of Long Island University. Formed in 1999, the league suspended operations after the 2007 season and the team has been inactive since then. The team took their name from Kings County, which is a name coextensive with the Brooklyn borough of New York City.

== History ==
On March 25, 1999, the USBL announced that the league would add a new franchise based in Brooklyn. The team was officially announced on April 19, 1999 by the New York City Mayor's office; the owner was Mohammed A. Nur and the first coach was Sam Worthen. The team played their games at the Schwartz Athletic Center in Brooklyn; among the members of the team's inaugural roster were Tremaine Fowlkes, Gordon Malone, Brian Reese and Ed "Booger" Smith. The Kings ended their first season with a 10–16 record, ranking third in the USBL Northern Division. Junie Sanders was selected in the All-USBL First Team.

In 2000, the team appointed Ken Charles as their new head coach, and they finished the season as second-to-last in the Northern Division with an 11–19 record. In 2001 the record improved to 12–17 (.414), but in 2002 the team had their worst season, and finished with a 7–23 record (.233). In 2003 the team had former St. John's alumni Anthony Glover and Chudney Gray in their roster, in addition to former NBA players Charles Jones and Rodrick Rhodes, and former top high school player Lenny Cooke. The team finished with a 12–18 record in the regular season and advanced to the postseason for the first time in their history: they lost to the Pennsylvania ValleyDawgs, 116–122. Cooke was the league leader in scoring (28.8 points), steals per game (2.8) and offensive rebounds per game (4.7): he was named the USBL Rookie of the Year, while Anthony Glover made the All-Rookie team.

In 2004, the team won the Eastern Division with a 20–10 record, and advanced to the playoffs. They beat the Oklahoma Storm in the quarterfinals and the Kansas Cagerz in the semifinals, reaching the USBL championship game. In the USBL final game the Kings lost to the Pennsylvania ValleyDawgs, 116–118. Kings player Chudney Gray was named USBL Player of the Year and was selected in the All-USBL First Team, together with teammates B. J. Mc Farlan and Jason Lampa.

The Brooklyn Kings topped the East Division again in 2005 with the best record of their history (21–9, .700): they again qualified for the playoffs, where they were eliminated by the Nebraska Cranes, 117–110. Coach Ken Charles was named USBL Coach of the Year and Anthony Glover, who led the USBL in steals, was named in the All-USBL First Team along with teammate B. J. McFarlan. The 2006 season saw the Kings rank first in the East Division once again, this time with an 18–12 record; the team was eliminated in the quarterfinal game of the playoffs by the Kansas Cagerz. In 2007, the final USBL season, the Kings made the playoffs with an 8–8 record, and advanced to the championship game, where they lost to the Kansas Cagerz, 92–95. Kings player Abdul Mills was named in the All-USBL First Team.

== Season-by-season records ==
Year	Wins	Losses	Win %	Head coach	Play-offs
1999	10	16	.385	Sam Worthen	-
2000	11	19	.367	Ken Charles	-
2001	12	17	.414	Ken Charles	-
2002	7	23	.233	Ken Charles	-
2003	12	18	.400	Ken Charles	Quarter finals
2004	20	10	.667	Ken Charles	Finals
2005	21	9	.700	Ken Charles	Quarter finals
2006	18	12	.600	Ken Charles	Quarter finals
2007	8	8	.500	Ken Charles	Finals

== Notable players ==
Note: Flags indicate national team eligibility at FIBA-sanctioned events. Players may hold other non-FIBA nationalities not displayed.

Criteria

To appear in this section a player must have either:

- Set a club record or won an individual award while at the club
- Played at least one official international match for their national team at any time
- Played at least one official NBA match at any time.

- (United States) Adrian Autry
- (Libya) Alpha Bangura
- (United States) Lenny Cooke
- (United States) Tremaine Fowlkes
- (United States) Anthony Glover
- (United States) Chudney Gray
- (United States) Charles Jones
- (United States) Louis White
- (United States) Thomas Jordan
- (United States) Jason Lampa
- (United States) Gordon Malone
- (United States) Jerry Reynolds
- (United States) Rodrick Rhodes
- (United States) Ed "Booger" Smith
- (United States) Dwayne Whitfield
