= American Honey (film) =

2016 film by Andrea Arnold

- Theatrical release poster
- Directed by: Andrea Arnold
- Written by: Andrea Arnold
- Produced by: Thomas Benski; Lars Knudsen; Jay Van Hoy; Lucas Ochoa; Pouya Shahbazian; Alice Weinberg
- Starring: Sasha Lane; Shia LaBeouf; Riley Keough
- Cinematography: Robbie Ryan
- Edited by: Joe Bini
- Production companies: BFI; Film4; ManDown Pictures; Maven Pictures; Parts & Labor; Pulse Films
- Distributed by: A24 (United States); Focus Features Universal Pictures (Select territories)
- Release dates: 15 May 2016 (Cannes); 30 September 2016 (United States); 14 October 2016 (United Kingdom)
- Running time: 163 minutes
- Countries: United Kingdom; United States
- Language: English
- Budget: $3.5 million
- Box office: $2.3 million

American Honey is a 2016 road drama film written and directed by Andrea Arnold, and starring Sasha Lane, Shia LaBeouf, and Riley Keough. The film follows Star (Lane), a young girl from a troubled home, who runs away with a traveling sales crew who drive across the American Midwest selling magazine subscriptions door to door. Principal photography began in May 2015 with filming taking place in several states across America. To date, it is Arnold's only film to be set and filmed outside of the United Kingdom.

The film was selected to compete for the Palme d'Or at the 2016 Cannes Film Festival where it won the Jury Prize. American Honey received critical acclaim, with praise for Arnold’s direction, Lane's performance, and Ryan’s cinematography. The performances of LaBeouf and Keough also received critical praise. The film was released in the U.S. on 30 September 2016, by A24 and in the UK on 14 October 2016 by Focus Features and Universal Pictures. For the 70th BAFTA Awards, American Honey received a nomination for Best British Film.

== Plot ==
Star is a teenager living in Muskogee, Oklahoma. She lives a painful life, caring for two children that are not hers and living with their sexually abusive father, Nathan. While trying to hitchhike home one day, she spies a van full of young people and makes eye contact with Jake, one of the boys in the group. Star follows them to a local Kmart and sees Jake dancing to "We Found Love" on top of the registers before being escorted out by security. Star returns Jake's phone, as it had fallen out of his pocket, and he offers her a job as part of their magazine sales crew, telling her to come with him to Kansas City. Star declines but Jake nevertheless tells her to meet them in the parking lot of the local Motel 6 the next morning.

Packing her belongings while Nathan is in another room, Star secretly escapes and takes the children to a local dance hall where their mother Misty dances. Star confronts Misty and tells her she needs to care for her own kids, and though Misty actively refuses, Star runs away from them and into the night. She goes to the motel and sleeps on the ground beneath the crew's van until morning.

In the morning as the other teens approach, Star is interviewed by the crew's leader, Krystal, who hires her on after she establishes that Star is a legal adult, that no one will miss her, and that she promises to work hard. In the van on the way to Kansas, Star meets the other members of the crew. After arriving in Kansas, Star is paired with Jake, the veteran of the group, to be trained. The pair are dropped off in an affluent neighborhood, where Star upsets potential customers because she disapproves of Jake's behavior. Jake lies, shows her that he has a gun, and steals a ring from one of the houses. Despite his radical behavior, Star is attracted to Jake, flirting with and eventually kissing him on the front lawn of one of the houses. That night, Krystal calls Star into her motel room and tells her that Jake has posted his lowest sales ever. Star promises to improve. As she watches on, Krystal, in a bikini patterned with the Confederate flag, forces Jake to apply lotion to her body.

The following day, upset by the events of the night prior, Star vows to outsell Jake. She flags down three strangers in a convertible wearing cowboy hats, who offer to help her, thinking she is being harassed by Jake. The trio bring her to their home and offer to buy several subscriptions if she swallows the worm at the bottom of a bottle of mezcal. Star does, and makes the sale. Jake, however, fearing the worst, arrives and threatens the men with a gun before stealing their car. Initially angry at Jake, Star is later touched that he came to find her, and the two have sex in the car before abandoning it in a parking lot. When they return to the motel for the evening, Jake tells her not to mention their relationship to anyone, and he gives the money Star earned to Krystal under the guise that he earned the money himself.

For a while, things between Jake and Star are tense, and Krystal threatens to drop her on the side of the road if she keeps causing trouble. The crew leaves the motel and ends up living temporarily in a rundown house, where Jake and Star renew their relationship behind Krystal’s back. Star asks him what his dreams are, and he shows her his private stash of cash and items he's stolen from the houses he visits, which he intends to use to buy a home.

The next day, Krystal dumps the girls off in the nearby oil fields. Star climbs in the back of the oil workers’ truck and tries to sell to them, but one of the oil workers tells her that he will pay her five hundred dollars to go out with him for the night. Star asks for a thousand dollars and agrees to meet with him when he gets off work. The man picks her up that evening and he subsequently masturbates as she sits next to him in the truck. After the man drops her off, she hears Jake stop the truck and attack the man. Shortly after, a bloodied Jake interrogates her, asking if she slept with the man. When Star refuses to give him a clear answer, Jake tears through the house and leaves on a motorcycle.

The following morning, the crew get in the van and find a new recruit there, while Jake is still missing. Krystal calls Star to her room at the motel and informs her she has let Jake go, that she paid him money for each girl he recruited, and that he slept with all of them. She finishes by telling Star that she isn’t special and that she means nothing to Jake.

The next day, Krystal takes the crew to a poor area in Rapid City, South Dakota. Star enters a house and meets several affable children whose mother is on drugs and unable to properly care for them. As Star's own mother died of a meth overdose, she feels empathetic toward them and leaves to buy them groceries when she notices that their fridge is empty. She returns and leaves the groceries on the porch. At the pickup that day, Jake is back in the van, and Star is further conflicted about her feelings towards him.

That evening, the crew light a bonfire. Dancing around the fire, Star is pulled aside by Jake, who hands her a baby turtle that he found in the nearby lake. Star takes it to the edge of the water and releases it before following the turtle into the water herself. She immerses herself fully beneath the surface of the water for an extended period of time, before abruptly rising for air once again. Above her head, as the water runs off of her body, a series of lightning bugs can be seen dispersing into the night sky.

== Cast ==
- Sasha Lane as Star
- Shia LaBeouf as Jake
- Riley Keough as Krystal
- Arielle Holmes as Pagan
- McCaul Lombardi as Corey
- Crystal B. Ice as Katness
- Chad McKenzie Cox as Billy
- Garry Howell as Austin
- Kenneth Kory Tucker as Sean
- Raymond Coalson as JJ
- Isaiah Stone as Kalium
- Dakota Powers as Runt
- Shawna Rae Moseley as Shaunte
- Christopher David Wright as Riley
- Veronica Ezell as QT
- Will Patton as Backseat Cowboy
- Bruce Gregory as Cattle Truck Driver
- Johnny Pierce II as Nathan
- Laura Kirk as Laura
- Summer Hunsaker as Kelsey
- Brody Hunsaker as Rubin
- Chasity Hunsaker as Misty

== Production ==
=== Development ===
Arnold began writing the screenplay in 2013 and it was first announced under the pre-production title Mag Crew at Film4's 2013 Cannes Film Festival party. Arnold has said the movie was inspired by an investigative piece she read in The New York Times about mag crews. The film was optioned from The Times and Ian Urbina in 2008. Arnold became inspired by lives of American youths in "magazine crews" who travel the United States selling magazine subscriptions, an occupation that has caused controversy in the United States. In researching for the film, Arnold embarked on a road trip from California to Miami, Florida. In late 2013, Arnold was the Filmmaker-in-Residence at the New York Film Festival. During this time, she worked on the second draft of the script and used the opportunity to meet with potential casting directors.

In 2014, the film's producers and new title, American Honey, were announced.

=== Casting ===
In March 2015, casting took place in Oklahoma in preparation for a summer shoot. Arnold "street cast" by searching beaches, streets, and approaching drunk teenagers. Casting directors Lucy Pardee and Jennifer Venditti also scoured public areas such as Walmart, bars, and dollar stores to scout individuals that would fit the roles of the mag crew youths. Arnold said she would scout places with individuals that a mag crew recruiter would find intriguing.

Arnold discovered Sasha Lane while she was on spring break with her friends. Lane subsequently auditioned for the film and was cast in the lead role. In April 2015, Shia LaBeouf was cast in an unspecified role and Riley Keough was cast shortly thereafter. In early June, Arielle Holmes was reported to have joined the cast. The remainder of the cast were found in parking lots, construction sites, streets, and state fairs.

=== Filming ===
External audio
- Filmmaker Andrea Arnold On 'American Honey' And Preserving Mystery In Film, 20:42, 29 September 2016, Fresh Air with Terry Gross

In May 2015, filming was reported in Muskogee, Okmulgee, and Norman, Oklahoma. In late May 2015, production was reported in Mission Hills, Kansas, and areas of Kansas City, Missouri, as well as Missouri Valley, Iowa. The pool scene was filmed at a private residence in Bennington, Nebraska. On 9 June, production took place in Omaha, Nebraska and Grand Island, Nebraska. On 24 June, LaBeouf was hospitalized after being injured on set during filming in Williston, North Dakota. Filming wrapped on 5 July 2015. The film was shot over 56 days, in several states.

As with Arnold's film Fish Tank, the process of filming was a combination of improvisation and scripted scenes. As shooting time was limited and the film was shot on the road, Arnold filmed unscripted interactions in the van to add to the realism of the film.

== Soundtrack ==
The film's soundtrack consists of 19 songs and features a mix of genres such as hip hop (specifically trap music), country, and pop rock. The songs were compiled by producer Julia Oh, music supervisors Earworm Music, Andrea Arnold, and the film's cast. The soundtrack was released digitally by UMe on September 30, 2016.

According to music critic Robert Christgau, the film's soundtrack album went "unheralded" but "makes a single living thing of Rae Sremmurd and the Raveonettes, E-40 and Steve Earle as the must-see Andrea Arnold flick it's attached to follows a troupe of young magazine-subscription hustlers across flyover country more humane than its taste in presidents might lead cineastes to believe." In a decade-end list, Christgau named it the third-best album of the 2010s. The film derives its title from "American Honey", a 2010 hit single by American country music group Lady A, that is sung along to by the sales crew in a pivotal scene.

American Honey (Original Motion Picture Soundtrack)

Soundtrack album by Various artists
- Released: September 30, 2016
- Genres: Hip hop; pop rock; country; folk
- Length: 1:13:13
- Label: UMe

Professional ratings
Review scores
Source	Rating
Robert Christgau	A

=== Track listing ===
1. "Beginning Of Anything" — Quigley
2. "Uber Everywhere" — MadeinTYO
3. "Take Your Time" — Sam Hunt
4. "Out The Mud" — Kevin Gates
5. "Copperhead Road" — Steve Earle
6. "Choices (Yup)" — E-40
7. "All The Time" — Jeremih feat. Lil Wayne & Natasha Mosley
8. "Ride" — Ciara ft. Ludacris
9. "Recharge and Revolt" — The Raveonettes
10. "No Type" — Rae Sremmurd
11. "Bricks" — Carnage ft. Migos
12. "Fade Into You" — Mazzy Star
13. "8896" — Låpsley
14. "U Guessed It" — OG Maco
15. "I Like Tuh" — Carnage
16. "Careless Love" — Bonnie "Prince" Billy
17. "American Honey" — Lady A
18. "God's Whisper" — Raury
19. "I Hate Hate (But I Love Love)" — Razzy Bailey

Other songs featured in the film but not included in the soundtrack are:

1. "Bounce It" — Juicy J ft. Wale and Trey Songz
2. "We Found Love" — Rihanna ft. Calvin Harris
3. "I Don't Dance" — Lee Brice
4. "I Don't Fuck with You" — Big Sean ft. E-40
5. "Mammas Don't Let Your Babies Grow Up to Be Cowboys" — Waylon Jennings
6. "Dream Baby Dream" — Bruce Springsteen
7. "I Kill Children" — Dead Kennedys

== Release ==
In January 2016, A24 acquired distribution rights to the film. In May 2016, Focus Features, where the film was initially in development under its original title, re-acquired most international distribution rights to the film, releasing it through its parent company Universal Pictures. The film had its world premiere at the 2016 Cannes Film Festival on 15 May 2016, where it was selected to compete for the Palme d'Or. The film also screened at the Toronto International Film Festival on 8 September 2016, Fantastic Fest, and the BFI London Film Festival on 7 October 2016.

American Honey was theatrically released in the United States on 30 September 2016 and on 14 October in the United Kingdom.

== Reception ==
=== Critical response ===
American Honey received positive reviews upon its premiere at the 2016 Cannes Film Festival. The film holds an 80% approval rating on review aggregator website Rotten Tomatoes, based on 215 reviews, with an average rating of 7.4/10. The website's critical consensus reads, "American Honey offers a refreshingly unconventional take on the coming-of-age drama whose narrative risks add up to a rewarding experience even if they don't all pay off." On review aggregator Metacritic, it holds an 80 out of 100 rating, based on reviews from 42 critics, indicating "generally favorable" reviews.

American Honey was also placed on several publications's "Best of the 2016 Cannes Film Festival" and "Best of the 2016 Toronto Film Festival" lists. Variety placed Sasha Lane's performance in the film at number 3 on their list of the 9 breakout performances of the 2016 Toronto Film Festival. The film won the 2016 Cannes Film Festival's Jury Prize, and received a special commendation from its Ecumenical Jury. This is Arnold's third time winning the Jury Prize, after Red Road in 2006 and Fish Tank in 2009.

Guy Lodge of Variety was extremely positive, writing, "Part dreamy millennial picaresque, part distorted tapestry of Americana and part exquisitely illustrated iTunes musical, "Honey" daringly commits only to the loosest of narratives across its luxurious 162-minute running time. Yet it's constantly, engrossingly active, spinning and sparking and exploding in cycles like a Fourth of July Catherine wheel." Eric Kohn of Indiewire was enthusiastic, writing that American Honey "proves Andrea Arnold is one of the best working filmmakers and finds a breakout star in Sasha Lane," and that "It's the closest thing to a magnum opus in Arnold's blossoming career." David Rooney of The Hollywood Reporter called the film "A road movie without a map that nonetheless arrives at a worthwhile destination," and wrote, "The film works best as a poignant character study, observing Star as she settles into her independence and figures out who she wants to be, framed by a vast physical landscape that stretches socioeconomically from privileged wealth to squalid poverty. There's a wonderful intimacy in the way Arnold examines young women in her films."

=== Accolades ===
Award	Category	Recipient(s)	Result	Ref(s)
Alliance of Women Film Journalists	Best Woman Director	Andrea Arnold	Nominated	
Alliance of Women Film Journalists	Best Woman Screenwriter	Andrea Arnold	Nominated	
Alliance of Women Film Journalists	Best Breakthrough Performance	Sasha Lane	Nominated	
Alliance of Women Film Journalists	Bravest Performance	Sasha Lane	Nominated	
Austin Film Critics Association	Breakthrough Artist Award	Sasha Lane	Nominated	
Black Reel Awards	Outstanding Actress	Sasha Lane	Nominated	
Black Reel Awards	Outstanding Breakthrough Performance, Female	Sasha Lane	Nominated	
Black Reel Awards	Outstanding Independent Film	American Honey	Won	
British Academy Film Awards	Best British Film	Andrea Arnold, Lars Knudsen, Pouya Shahbazian and Jay Van Hoy	Nominated	
British Independent Film Awards	Best British Independent Film	American Honey	Won	
British Independent Film Awards	Best Director	Andrea Arnold	Won	
British Independent Film Awards	Best Actress	Sasha Lane	Won	
British Independent Film Awards	Best Actor	Shia LaBeouf	Nominated	
British Independent Film Awards	Best Screenplay	Andrea Arnold	Nominated	
British Independent Film Awards	Best Technical Achievement	Robbie Ryan (cinematography)	Won	
Cannes Film Festival	Palme d'Or	Andrea Arnold	Nominated	
Cannes Film Festival	Jury Prize	Andrea Arnold	Won	
Dorian Awards	Unsung Film of the Year	American Honey	Nominated	
Empire Awards	Best Female Newcomer	Sasha Lane	Nominated	
Empire Awards	Best Director	Andrea Arnold	Nominated	
Evening Standard British Film Awards	Best Film	American Honey	Nominated	
Evening Standard British Film Awards	Technical Achievement	Robbie Ryan (cinematography)	Nominated	
Florida Film Critics Circle	Best Ensemble	The cast of American Honey	Won	
Gotham Awards	Breakthrough Actor	Sasha Lane	Nominated	
Independent Spirit Awards	Best Feature	American Honey	Nominated	
Independent Spirit Awards	Best Director	Andrea Arnold	Nominated	
Independent Spirit Awards	Best Female Lead	Sasha Lane	Nominated	
Independent Spirit Awards	Best Supporting Female	Riley Keough	Nominated	
Independent Spirit Awards	Best Supporting Male	Shia LaBeouf	Nominated	
Independent Spirit Awards	Best Cinematography	Robbie Ryan	Nominated	
London Film Critics Circle	Film of the Year	American Honey	Nominated	
London Film Critics Circle	British / Irish Film of the Year	American Honey	Nominated	
London Film Critics Circle	Supporting Actor of the Year	Shia LaBeouf	Nominated	
London Film Critics Circle	Supporting Actress of the Year	Riley Keough	Nominated	
London Film Critics Circle	Technical Achievement	Robby Ryan (cinematography)	Nominated	
Los Cabos International Film Festival	Premio Cinemex	Andrea Arnold	Won	
Stockholm International Film Festival	FIPRESCI Award	Andrea Arnold	Won	
Women Film Critics Circle	Best Young Actress	Sasha Lane	Nominated	
Women Film Critics Circle	Adrienne Shelly Award	American Honey	Won	
