= Funny Pages (film) =

2022 film by Owen Kline

- Theatrical release poster
- Directed by: Owen Kline
- Written by: Owen Kline
- Produced by: Josh Safdie; Benny Safdie; Sebastian Bear-McClard; Ronald Bronstein; Oscar Boyson; David Duque-Estrada
- Starring: Daniel Zolghadri; Matthew Maher; Miles Emanuel; Maria Dizzia; Josh Pais
- Cinematography: Sean Price Williams; Hunter Zimny
- Edited by: Owen Kline; Erin Dewitt
- Music by: Sean O'Hagan
- Production companies: A24; Elara Pictures
- Distributed by: A24
- Release dates: May 24, 2022 (Cannes); August 26, 2022 (United States)
- Running time: 86 minutes
- Country: United States
- Language: English

Funny Pages is a 2022 American coming-of-age black comedy film written, directed, and edited by Owen Kline and produced by the Safdie brothers. It stars Daniel Zolghadri, Matthew Maher, Miles Emanuel, Maria Dizzia, and Josh Pais. The film was shot on Super 16 mm.

It premiered at the 2022 Cannes Film Festival and was released in the United States on August 26, 2022, where it received positive reviews from critics. The film was ranked among the Best Films of 2022 by The New York Times, BFI Sight and Sound, and awarded as one of the Top 10 Independent Films of 2022 by the National Board of Review.

The film tells the story of a 17-year-old cartoonist Robert, who leaves home after the death of his mentor to forge his own path. He moves to a basement apartment in Trenton, New Jersey, and meets Wallace, a possibly unstable former cartoonist.

== Plot ==
Robert Bleichner, a high school student and aspiring cartoonist, meets with his art teacher, Mr. Katano, in his classroom. Katano reviews Robert's portfolio, containing bizarre sexual figures, and asks him to draw a nude figure of him, thinking the portfolio drawings aren't as weird as his cartoon work. Before completing the drawing, Robert's phone alarm goes off and he leaves for work. Katano drives alongside Robert attempting to entice him into his car but Katano is suddenly struck and killed by another car.

Robert rummages through Katano's classroom to find anything of sentimental value from his late mentor, and then breaks into Katano's apartment with his friend Miles. Police respond and arrest Robert while Miles escapes. Robert is defended in court by public defender Cheryl Quartermaine. No charges are brought and he's allowed to keep Katano's possessions. Robert announces to his disappointed parents, Lewis and Jennifer, that he will pursue a career in art and won't finish the school year.

Robert leaves his parents' house and moves to Trenton, New Jersey, where he shares a dingy apartment with two older men, Barry and Steven. Robert takes a job working for Cheryl as a notetaker while continuing to work at a local comic book store. During one of Cheryl's meetings, Robert learns her client, Wallace, used to work as an assistant colorist for Image Comics. Robert's attempts to connect with Wallace to discuss his comic book career are frustrated by Wallace's erratic and volatile behavior. Wallace finally accepts a ride home from Robert, and pressures him into taking him to the pharmacy where he was charged with assault. Wallace convinces Robert to provoke the pharmacist in an attempt to get him fired, believing it will help with his case. Robert reluctantly agrees in order to earn Wallace's approval, but fails to provoke the pharmacist. Robert drops Wallace at home, and arranges for a paid art lesson from Wallace. When Robert walks into his roommates masturbating to Katano's adult comics, he moves back with his parents.

When Wallace arrives at Robert's family home in Princeton, New Jersey the next morning, Lewis and Jennifer are immediately suspicious of him. An increasingly uncomfortable Wallace locks himself in the bathroom and smashes a window in frustration. Robert takes Wallace up to his room and pays him with money stolen from his mother. Miles arrives unannounced and tries to show Wallace his work. During the lesson, Wallace finds Robert has drawn a cartoon parody of him, screams at the boys and a scuffle ensues. Miles is accidentally stabbed in the head with a pen. Wallace attempts to flee in Robert's car but crashes it into the garage. Wallace beats up Robert when he chases after him, telling him to leave him alone. Robert stumbles to the closed comic book store, sits at the counter and contemplates events.

== Cast ==
- Daniel Zolghadri as Robert Bleichner
- Matthew Maher as Wallace
- Miles Emanuel as Miles
- Maria Dizzia as Jennifer
- Josh Pais as Lewis
- Marcia Debonis as Cheryl Quartermaine
- Stephen Adly Guirgis as Mr. Katano
- Michael Townsend Wright as Barry
- Cleveland Thomas Jr. as Steven
- Rob M. Anderson as Joe (comic shop clerk)
- Ron Rifkin as grandfather
- Tony Hassini as Richard
- Andy Milonakis as George
- Shane Fleming as Gabe
- Charlie Judkins as comics expert
- Peter Lucibello as Santa
- Louise Lasser as Linda (pharmacy lady)
- Buddy Duress as Ryan
- Constance Shulman as Mrs. Ochs

== Production ==
The film began shooting in 2017 with the working title Two Against Nature and, after several delays and re-writes, filming was completed in December 2021.

The film notably marked the final film role of Louise Lasser as well as Buddy Duress.

== Release ==
The film premiered at the 2022 Cannes Film Festival in the Directors' Fortnight section on May 24, 2022, where it received a three-minute standing ovation. It premiered in the US at an outdoor screening at the Brooklyn Army Terminal on August 20, 2022, before being released theatrically on August 26.

== Reception ==
=== Critical response ===
On the review aggregator website Rotten Tomatoes, 82% of 104 critics' reviews are positive, with an average rating of 7.2/10. The website's consensus reads: "It won't be for all tastes, but Funny Pages deserves credit for telling a coming-of-age story that leans heavier on cringe comedy than nostalgia." Metacritic, which uses a weighted average, assigned the film a score of 73 out of 100, based on 32 critics, indicating "generally favorable" reviews.

Writing for The New York Times, Manohla Dargis remarked that "it's startling how good the film is" but that "there's nothing remotely cool about Robert or, really, Funny Pages. That's because cool is entirely beside the point. What matters is a sensibility, a worldview — what matters is art."

K. Austin Collins of Rolling Stone called it "an itchy, smart, unpredictable portrait of a young artist [that] practically makes you see Robert with double vision." That "it goes out of its way to see its characters in the most unvarnished, unfiltered light, closing in on bad skin and awkward haircuts and embarrassing masturbation rituals and squinty eyes that look extremely wet for no particular reason" but that "it's also hard to avoid sharing in that obsession. People are incredibly odd. How can you help but look?"

The film was ranked 28th out of 113 by Nate Jones in Vulture on a 2022 list of “Every A24 Film, Ranked.”

=== Accolades ===
Award	Date	Category	Recipient(s)	Result
Cannes Film Festival	May 2022	Golden Camera	Owen Kline	Nominated
Gotham Awards	November 28, 2022	Breakthrough Director Award	Owen Kline	Nominated
Independent Spirit Awards	March 4, 2023	Best Breakthrough Performance	Daniel Zolghadri	Nominated
National Board of Review	2022	Top Ten Independent Films		Won
