= Elara Pictures =

American film production company

- Industry: Film industry
- Founder: Josh Safdie; Benny Safdie; Ronald Bronstein; Sebastian Bear-McClard
- Headquarters: New York, New York, U.S.
- Area served: United States
- Website: elara.world

Elara Pictures is an American independent film production and television production company founded by Josh Safdie, Benny Safdie, Ronald Bronstein and Sebastian Bear-McClard.

They have produced such films as Heaven Knows What (2014), Good Time (2017), Uncut Gems (2019) and Funny Pages (2022).

Uncut Gems, starring Adam Sandler, is Elara's highest-grossing film. It is A24's third-highest-grossing film domestically, behind Marty Supreme (2025) and Everything Everywhere All at Once (2022), and was the company's highest-grossing film at the time of its release.

== History ==
In 2014, Josh Safdie, Benny Safdie, Ronald Bronstein and Sebastian Bear-McClard launched the company to produce projects. The company's first film Heaven Knows What had its world premiere at the 71st Venice International Film Festival in September 2014, and was released in May 2015, by RADiUS-TWC.

In May 2020, the company entered a two-year first-look deal with HBO and A24. Under the terms, A24 will executive produce all HBO-Elara projects and partner with Elara on select projects outside of the HBO first look.

The company has additionally produced the television series Chillin Island (2021), Telemarketers (2023), Love Has Won: The Cult of Mother God (2023) for HBO, and The Curse for Showtime.

In March 2023, Sebastian Bear-McClard was accused of sexual misconduct, with allegations including reaching out to an underage girl on Instagram for Good Time, who felt pressured into performing a nude scene, which was ultimately removed from the final cut of the film, and not discussing pay; instead paying her with cigarettes. Bear-McClard additionally was alleged to be in contact with another underage girl and had an inappropriate relationship with an assistant on the set of Uncut Gems. Bear-McClard was fired by Elara in July 2022 due to the allegations.

By 2024, the Safdie brothers had amicably ended their creative partnership and had since pursued solo careers. As a result of their split, Josh and Benny had formed their own companies. Josh founded Central Pictures with frequent collaborator Ronald Bronstein, where it produced If I Had Legs I'd Kick You and Marty Supreme, the latter serving as Josh’s first film as solo director since The Pleasure of Being Robbed (2008). Benny formed Out of The Count Productions, where it produced The Smashing Machine, which serves as Benny’s solo directing debut. As of 2026, the status of Elara Pictures remains unknown.

== Filmography ==
Release Date	Genre	Title	Distribution or Network
May 29, 2015	Feature film	Heaven Knows What	distributed by RADiUS-TWC
August 11, 2017	Feature film	Good Time	distributed by A24
December 13, 2019	Feature film	Uncut Gems	distributed by A24
December 10, 2021	Reality series	Chillin Island	HBO
August 26, 2022	Feature film	Funny Pages	distributed by A24
August 13, 2023	Documentary series	Telemarketers	HBO
August 31, 2023	Documentary film	Thank You Very Much	
November 10, 2023	TV series	The Curse	Showtime
November 13, 2023	Documentary series	Love Has Won: The Cult of Mother God	HBO
June 2, 2024	Documentary series	Ren Faire	HBO
May 23, 2025	Documentary series	Pee-Wee as Himself	HBO
