= Paul Sidhu =

American actor

Paul Singh Sidhu
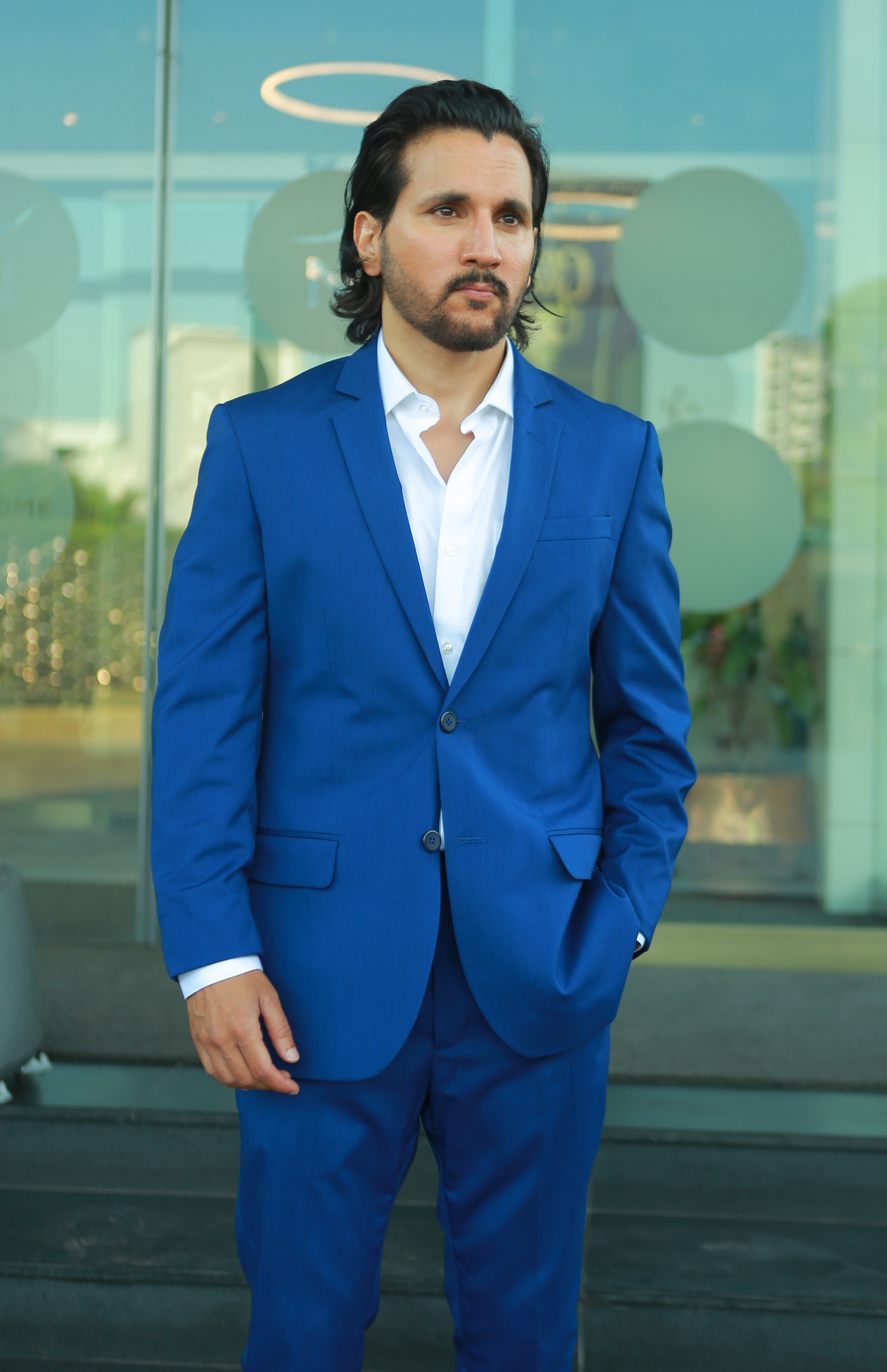
- Sidhu in Jan 2020
- Born: 28 October 1977 (age 48); Seattle
- Other name: Amar Sidhu
- Occupations: Actor; Screenwriter; Producer; Dermatologist
- Years active: 2004–present

Paul Sidhu is an American actor, producer, and dermatologic surgeon. He made his debut with the 2010 Bollywood action film Aakhari Decision.

== Medical career ==
Sidhu attended the University of Washington and earned a degree in psychology and he earned his Doctor of Medicine degree at Tulane University. While at Tulane University, Sidhu became the president of the Alpha Omega Alpha Honor Medical Society. He was awarded the Outstanding Leadership Award and was the Valedictorian of his graduating class.

Sidhu began his general surgery training at Virginia Mason Medical Center with a focus in cosmetic surgery. He completed his residency in dermatology at the University of Southern California and was awarded the "Outstanding Resident Award". Sidhu runs his private practice in Glendora, California.

== Film career ==
Sidhu made his debut with Aakhari Decision, an action film that was released in 2010. His next release was the 2016 science fiction Hollywood film 2307: Winter's Dream, that won several awards.

Sidhu has also completed a Prison film, Escape from Black Water, directed by Roger Ellis Frazier, Hustle Down, Repeater, Deep Stage, and Upper Cut.
