= Soul in the Hole =

- Theatrical release poster
- Directed by: Danielle Gardner
- Produced by: Lilibet Foster
- Starring: Kenny Jones
- Cinematography: Paul Gibson
- Edited by: Melissa Neidich
- Distributed by: Northern Arts Entertainment (US); Celluloid Dreams (International)
- Release date: August 8, 1997
- Running time: 98 minutes
- Country: United States
- Language: English

Soul In The Hole is a 1997 documentary film about aspiring basketball coach Kenny Jones, his playground dream team "Kenny's Kings," the relationship between him and his players (particularly playground phenom 18-year-old Ed "Booger" Smith) and life in Brooklyn during the summer.

It won the Independent Spirit: Truer Than Fiction Award (tied with Errol Morris' "Fast, Cheap and Out of Control") and was nominated for an International Documentary Association Award (IDA). Named Top Ten Gem by Premiere Magazine; twice-named Top Ten Film and called "...The best film made about basketball--and about growing up black, male and street..." by the Village Voice . Selected in competition or otherwise screened at the Rotterdam, Berlin, Munich, Cologne, Helsinki, Festival des Femmes, New Zealand and other international film festivals.

== Box office ==
Soul in the Hole was given a theatrical release on August 8, 1997. The film grossed $30,697 while being shown in 6 theaters. Internationally, it was theatrically and television released in France, Germany and the UK and many other countries by Celluloid Dreams.

== Soundtrack ==
A soundtrack containing hip hop music was released on July 29, 1997 by Loud Records, with the theme song by The WuAllStars. It peaked at 73 on the Billboard 200 and 13 on the Top R&B/Hip-Hop Albums.
