= 2307: Winter's Dream =

- Directed by: Joey Curtis
- Written by: Joey Curtis
- Starring: Paul Sidhu; Arielle Holmes
- Distributed by: Vertical Entertainment
- Release dates: April 2016 (Universe Multicultural Film Festival); March 1, 2018 (Netflix)
- Running time: 101 minutes
- Country: United States
- Language: English

2307: Winter's Dream is a 2016 American science fiction film written and directed by Joey Curtis and starring Paul Sidhu and Arielle Holmes.

== Cast ==
- Paul Sidhu as Bishop
- Arielle Holmes as Kix
- Timothy Lee DePriest as Ishmael
- Anne-Solenne Hatte as Atka
- Kelcey Watson as El Hatta
- Brad Potts as Trajan
- Branden Coles as ASH-393

== Production ==
In February 2017, it was announced that Vertical Entertainment acquired U.S. distribution rights to the film.

== Release ==
The film premiered under the title Winter's Dream at the 2016 Universe Multicultural Film Festival. It was released on Netflix on March 1, 2018.

== Reception ==
Michael Rechtshaffen of the Los Angeles Times gave the film a negative review and wrote that Curtis "admittedly takes advantage of a record-breaking western New York snowfall to mood-setting effect, but all that smirk-inducing dialogue and the weightless performances inevitably take their toll."
