= William Sanders (basketball) =

American basketball player

Junie Sanders
Personal information
- Born: May 12, 1972 (age 54) Brooklyn, New York, U.S.
- Listed height: 6 ft 3 in (1.91 m)
- Listed weight: 221 lb (100 kg)

Career information
- High school: John Jay (Brooklyn, New York)
- College: Independence CC (1991–1993); Central Oklahoma (1993–1995)
- NBA draft: 1995: undrafted
- Playing career: 1997–2008
- Position: Shooting guard

Career history
- 1997: Westchester Kings
- 1998: Long Island Surf
- 1999: Brooklyn Kings
- 2002: Adirondack Wildcats
- 2002–2004: Fayetteville Patriots
- 2004: Maccabi Giv'at Shmuel
- 2005–2006: Argentino de Junín
- 2006: Brno
- 2006: Deportivo Madryn
- 2007: Sionista

Career highlights
- All-NBDL Second Team (2004)

William "Junie" Sanders (born May 12, 1972) is an American former professional basketball player. He played high school ball at John Jay High School before he moved on to Independence Community College. He later played in the United States Basketball League and several foreign nations, including Argentina, Luxembourg, Germany, Israel, Poland, Portugal, and Puerto Rico. He played in the NBA D-League with Fayetteville Patriots for 2 years, where in his second year he averaged 16.9 points per game. In streetball he scored 39 points on NBA All Star Jerry Stackhouse. In streetball, he was nicknamed "General Electric".
