= Telemarketers (TV series) =

American true crime documentary series

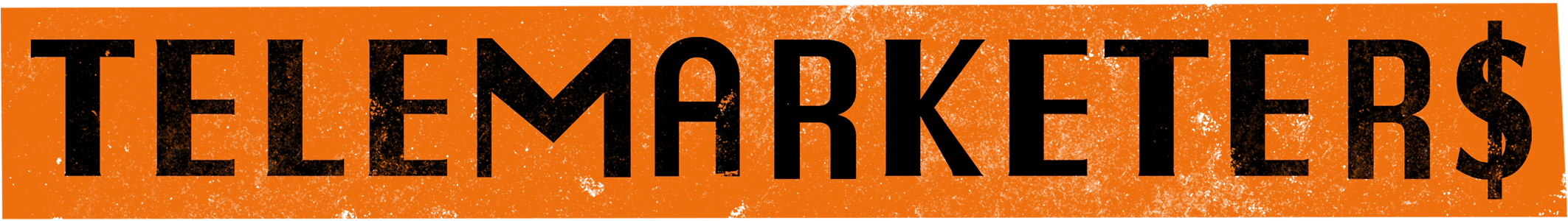
- Genre: Documentary
- Directed by: Adam Bhala Lough; Sam Lipman-Stern
- Music by: Robert Aiki Aubrey Lowe
- Country of origin: United States
- Original language: English
- No. of episodes: 3

Production
- Executive producers: Adam Bhala Lough; Sam Lipman-Stern; Josh Safdie; Benny Safdie; Dani Bernfeld; Danny McBride; Jody Hill; David Gordon Green; Greg Stewart; Brendan James; Nancy Abraham; Lisa Heller; Tina Nguyen
- Producer: Claire Read
- Cinematography: Christopher Messina; Mattia Palombi; Sam Lipman-Stern
- Editor: Christopher Passig
- Running time: 53–63 minutes
- Production companies: HBO Documentary Films; Elara Pictures; Rough House Pictures; All Facts

Original release
- Network: HBO
- Release: August 13 – August 27, 2023

Telemarketers is an American true crime documentary series directed and produced by Adam Bhala Lough and Sam Lipman-Stern. It follows two office workers who stumble upon the truth of their work at a telemarketing center and are determined to expose the industry. The three-part series aired on HBO from August 13 to 27, 2023.

== Premise ==
Telemarketers follows Sam Lipman-Stern and Patrick Pespas, two employees at telemarketing firm Civic Development Group in early 2000s New Jersey, who discover the truth behind the work they've been doing. Under the impression they're raising money for firefighter and police charities, the vast majority of funds raised are actually going towards their employers. When the company is shut down by the Federal Trade Commission, Lipman-Stern and Pespas realize that the industry is far from destroyed and in fact, stronger than ever. Together, they seek to expose the telemarketing industry as the wide-scale scam that it is.

== Episodes ==
No.	Title	Directed by	Original release date
1	"Part 1"	Adam Bhala Lough; Sam Lipman-Stern	August 13, 2023
In 2001, Sam Lipman-Stern is a high school dropout that finds work at the only place that’ll take him: New Jersey’s Civic Development Group, a telemarketing firm that employs the unemployable (ex-cons, teenagers, and drug addicts). Ostensibly raising money for police organizations, the employees engage in several illicit activities on a daily basis, many of which began to be recorded by Lipman-Stern. Sam befriends best caller in CDG (and active drug addict), Patrick J. Pespas. The two decide to make a documentary that exposes the inner workings of CDG and uncover where the money raised actually goes. Before things can get off the ground, Lipman-Stern is fired for posting the videos he recorded online, and not long after that, the entire firm is shut down due to a FTC case. Realizing that, despite the legal proceedings, the telemarketing industry is still alive and well, Lipman-Stern and Pespas decide to move forward with the documentary and discover that the real danger in their pursuit might not lie with the telemarketers, but the organizations they’re raising money for.
2	"Part 2"	Adam Bhala Lough; Sam Lipman-Stern	August 20, 2023
In 2011, a year after CDG had been shut down, Sam catches up with his old coworkers and finds most of them struggling. He and Pat realize that the police fraternities that they were raising money for (and were apparently being scammed by CDG) were actually much more aware of and possibly involved in the underhanded tactics used by the telemarketers. Despite this, none of them suffered any consequences in the FTC case, the two learning that they were protected by America’s lax regulations against not-for-profits, which the police fraternities claimed to be, despite amassing millions of dollars and very rarely paying out police officers and their families. Sam interviews telemarketers that are still in the game, including former co-workers Jeff and Shem, who, despite their own issues (i.e. Shem’s substance abuse), reveal themselves to be excellent salespeople by implying they work for the police. The National Fraternal Order of Police denies any involvement with telemarketing and Sam and Pat begin to feel like they’re being tailed by cops. A breakthrough in the case finally comes when the FTC commissioner that took down CDG agrees to an interview, but just as it happens, Pat disappears.
3	"Part 3"	Adam Bhala Lough; Sam Lipman-Stern	August 27, 2023
In 2019, Sam has moved to Los Angeles and taken on various film-related jobs, all but abandoning the documentary. Pat floats in and out of Sam’s life, but knowing his history of substance abuse, Sam always fears the worst when years go by without hearing from him. Finally, Pat calls him a changed man, fully sober and ready to get back on the documentary again. Linking up with his cousin, filmmaker Adam Bhala Lough, Sam and Pat reconnect and discover that the telemarketing industry now primarily uses robocalls, with voices based on past callers. They manage to get another chance to interview FTC commissioner David Vladek, who reveals that police unions in America are too powerful to legislate, hence why they were left unharmed during the FTC’s original case against CDG. Sam and Pat meet Sarah Kleiner, one of the few journalists who have consistently investigated telemarketing scams and police union’s involvement with them. She encourages them to learn more about modern telemarketing firms, so Pat acquires a job and goes undercover as a telemarketer, discovering that the firms have progressed to calling for “scam PACs” that permit them to not have to disclose that they are paid callers or the percentages of where donations go. Sam and Pat attempt to interview several police unions but all of them turn them down. They eventually attend the national Fraternal Order of Police event where they manage to interview the vice president of the Texas FOP, who denies that his particular lodge no longer uses telemarketing fundraising, but claims that he cannot speak for any other one. They are able to get a sit-down interview with Senator Richard Blumenthal, who had attempted to clean up the telemarketing industry in the 1990s. The eventual interview is cut short by Blumenthal, who doesn’t address any of Pat's concerns about the industry and promises that action will be taken if it needs to be. Six months later, Blumenthal has not made good on his promise and ignores all attempts at contact.

== Production ==
=== Development ===
In 2001, Sam Lipman-Stern began working at Civic Development Group, a telemarketing firm focused on raising money for police organizations. Lipman-Stern, an aspiring filmmaker, began recording all the debaucherous events at the office, including employees doing drugs, getting tattoos, and employing sex workers in the office bathrooms, activities that were all permitted as long as employees made their quota. Lipman-Stern began posting the videos on YouTube, eventually getting fired due to videos being public online. Lipman-Stern was informed by his co-worker Pat Pespas that Civic Development Group was keeping the majority of donations raised. This, coupled with the firm being penalized “$18.8 million, the largest penalty ever handed down in a consumer protection case”, by the Federal Trade Commission, inspired Lipman-Stern to expose the company on film. He and Pespas began a documentary project, hiring crew off Craigslist and investigating the company and interviewing charity experts and victims of scams. Just as they were getting furthest in the investigation, Pespas disappeared, relapsing into his substance abuse and the documentary was shelved.

=== Filming ===
Lipman-Stern continued work on the project sporadically, including some scenes shot whilst he attended film school at Temple University. In 2019, Lipman-Stern met his cousin-through-marriage, filmmaker Adam Bhala Lough, who was running All Facts, a documentary production company with a partnership with Rough House Pictures, the production company headed by David Gordon Green, Danny McBride, and Jody Hill. Hearing the story of CDG, Bhala Lough asked Lipman-Stern to loan him the footage, which was in multiple formats and largely unlabeled. Lough spent a weekend in Joshua Tree National Park watching the raw footage, and came to the conclusion that a project could be made with the material. He and Lipman-Stern began developing the project.

The rough, New York Metropolitan-area feel of the footage reminded Bhala Lough of the films of his friends Josh Safdie and Benny Safdie. Bhala Lough sent footage to them and asked them to direct the project, but they were unable to commit due to their obligations to the film Uncut Gems. Lipman-Stern and Bhala Lough then developed the project into a docuseries, with the Safdies boarding as executive producers via their Elara Pictures banner, as did Green, McBride, Hill, and Brandon James of Rough House. In 2020, after the show had been pitched and acquired by HBO Documentary Films, Lipman-Stern and Pespas resumed their investigation with a full production team. They reached out and interviewed several police lodges that had been the beneficiary of telemarketing funds, as well as Scott Pasch and David Keezer, the owners of Civic Development Group, who declined to participate.

== Reception ==
Telemarketers received critical acclaim. On the review aggregator website Rotten Tomatoes, 96% of 25 critics' reviews are positive. The website's consensus reads: "Hold the phone! A truly stranger than fiction scandal is recounted with addictive aplomb in this gritty and farcical docuseries." On Metacritic, the series has a weighted average score of 81 out of 100, based on 13 critics, indicating "universal acclaim".

=== Year-end lists ===
Select year-end list appearances for Telemarketers
Critic/publication	List	Rank	Ref
Time	The 10 Best Shows of 2023	7	
Vulture	The Best TV Shows of 2023	5	
The A.V. Club	30 Best TV Shows of 2023	10	
Slate	The 10 Best Shows of 2023	Top 10	
The Hollywood Reporter	The Best TV Shows of 2023	Honorable Mention	
The Wall Street Journal	The Best TV Shows of 2023	Unranked	
W Magazine	The Very Best TV Shows of 2023	Unranked	

=== Accolades ===
- Primetime Emmy Award for Outstanding Documentary or Nonfiction Series 2024 (nomination)
- Gotham Independent Film Awards 2023 - Breakthrough Series – Over 40 minutes (nomination)
- Critics' Choice Documentary Awards 2023 - Best True Crime Documentary (winner)

== Aftermath ==
=== Blumenthal's response ===
United States Senator Richard Blumenthal’s appearance in the series finale was widely criticized. Despite promising the filmmaking team an hour-long conversation, Blumenthal cut short the interview with Pespas after three minutes and failed to provide any meaningful responses to Pespas’ findings on the telemarketing industry, leaving the room and having his staff usher the filmmakers out, after further promising that his staff would meet with the filmmakers. Blumenthal and his team would ignore all attempts at follow-up contact by the filmmakers in the months following the interview.

Nearly two weeks after the finale aired, Blumenthal issued a statement that he planned to request appropriate agencies to review their actions and recommend policy changes regarding the kind of telemarketing fraud that the documentary covered. Specifically, he was “preparing to send letters to the heads of the Federal Election Commission and the Federal Trade Commission this week, requesting that each agency conduct a review of their tactics and recommend policy changes to help regulators step up enforcement against unscrupulous callers who “prey on” Americans’ goodwill and political contributions.”

=== Pespas' disappearance ===
On October 2, 2023, less than two months after the series premiered, a media release was published revealing that Pespas had been missing since September 29 and had been last spotted in a bar in Pittsburgh. The filmmaking team relayed messages from Pespas’s family and friends asking for help in locating and returning him home. On October 26, 2023, director Lough shared on social media that Pespas had been “found and returned safely to his wife”, thanking those who had helped in the search and asking for them to now respect Pespas and his wife’s privacy.
