= Ed Smith (streetball player) =

American streetball player

Personal information
- Born: c. 1973 (age 52–53)
- Listed height: 5 ft 10 in (1.78 m)

Career information
- High school: Westinghouse (Brooklyn, New York)
- College: Arizona Western (1993–1994)
- NBA draft: 1997: undrafted
- Position: Point guard

Career history
- 1997–1998: La Crosse Bobcats
- 1999: Brooklyn Kings
- 1999–2000: Rochester Skeeters

Edward "Booger" Smith (born c. 1973) is an American streetball player and former professional basketball player. He is 5 feet 10 inches (1.78 m) tall and played as a point guard. Smith played for a season at Arizona Western College and then professionally in the United States Basketball League (USBL), Continental Basketball Association (CBA) and International Basketball Association (IBA). He featured in the 1997 documentary Soul in the Hole which documented his basketball career after he left high school and played collegiately.

Smith is also one of a few streetballers who have ever appeared on the cover of the magazine Sports Illustrated. He is also known for participating in New York City's EBC basketball tournament. On the basketball court, Smith is known for his dribbling and passing abilities.

== Playing career ==
Smith was raised by his mother in the Tompkins Projects of Brooklyn, New York; he never met his father. He played basketball at George Westinghouse Career and Technical Education High School but dropped out before his senior year. Smith played for one semester at Arizona Western College during the 1993–94 season.

Smith played professionally for the Brooklyn Kings of the United States Basketball League (USBL), La Crosse Bobcats of the Continental Basketball Association (CBA) and Rochester Skeeters of the International Basketball Association (IBA).
