= Aakhari Decision =

- Poster
- Directed by: Deepak Bandhu
- Produced by: A.Singh
- Starring: Amar Sidhu; Sumona Chakravarti; Anant Jog; Nagesh Bhonsle
- Cinematography: Andrew Strahorn
- Edited by: Raju Surve
- Music by: Tutul, Bapi, Hanif Sheikh
- Release date: 19 February 2010
- Country: India
- Language: Hindi

Aakhari Decision (transl. The last decision) is a 2010 Indian Hindi-language action film directed by Deepak Bandhu. The film stars Amar Sidhu and Sumona Chakravarti with Anant Jog and Nagesh Bhonsle playing important roles.

== Cast ==
- Amar Sidhu as Arjun Jaiswal
- Sumona Chakravarti as Mansi
- Anant Jog as Commissioner Shyam Singh
- Nagesh Bhonsle as Victor
- Mushtaq Khan
- Kamlesh Sawant as Rajeev Chowdhary
- Navni Parihar

== Production ==
LA-based doctor Amar Sidhu made his acting debut through this film.

== Soundtrack ==
Music by Tutul, Bapi, and Hanif Sheikh. Ranjeet attended the film's audio launch.

No.	Title	Singer(s)	Length
1.	"Zaara Maara Maara Se"	Shaan
2.	"Maula Mere Maula Mere"	Shaan
3.	"Yeh Asmaan Yeh Zameen"	Hamza
4.	"Oye Paape Ek Peg Do"	Kailash Kher
5.	"Zaara Maara Maara Se" (Remix)	Zubeen Garg
6.	"Yeh Asmaan Yeh Zameen" (Remix)	Hamza

== Release ==
The film was screened at the Pravasi Film Festival in Delhi, India in January 2010.
