= Lenny Cooke (film) =

- Film poster
- Directed by: Josh Safdie; Benny Safdie
- Produced by: Adam Shopkorn
- Starring: Lenny Cooke
- Cinematography: Josh Safdie
- Edited by: Benny Safdie
- Production company: Shop Korn Productions
- Distributed by: Under the Milky Way
- Release dates: April 18, 2013 (Tribeca); December 6, 2013 (United States)
- Running time: 88 minutes
- Country: United States
- Language: English

Lenny Cooke is a 2013 American sports documentary film directed by Josh and Benny Safdie. It tells the life of the former high school basketball player Lenny Cooke. The film had its world premiere at the 2013 Tribeca Film Festival on April 18, 2013. It was released in the United States in limited theaters on December 6, 2013.

== Plot ==
In 2001, Lenny Cooke is one of the top-ranked high school basketball players. He expects to be selected in the 2002 NBA draft, but goes unselected. After having played in a series of minor leagues, he quits basketball. He resides near Emporia, Virginia with his fiancée and his son.

== Production ==
Adam Shopkorn, who set out to make a documentary about a high school basketball player becoming an NBA player, followed Lenny Cooke around with several cinematographers in 2001. Subsequently, he lost touch with Cooke. In 2010, he went to a screening of Josh and Benny Safdie's film Daddy Longlegs and asked them to check the footage. The Safdies agreed to join the project and started filming Cooke, which lasted nearly three years. The film was shot by Josh and edited by Benny. The Safdies took inspiration from the film Hoop Dreams, as well as the filmmakers Albert and David Maysles, Frederick Wiseman, Ross McElwee, and Shirley Clarke.

In a 2013 interview with Complex, Cooke stated that he "enjoyed filming it." He added, "Got some good points in it, got some bad points in it, but that's life and I hope the next generation of student-athletes take heed to it."

== Release ==
The film had its world premiere at the 2013 Tribeca Film Festival on April 18, 2013. It was released in the United States in limited theaters on December 6, 2013.

== Reception ==
On the review aggregator website Rotten Tomatoes, 78% of 23 critics' reviews are positive, with an average rating of 7.1/10. On Metacritic, the film has a weighted average score of 70 out of 100, based on 14 critics, indicating "generally favorable" reviews.

Odie Henderson of RogerEbert.com gave the film 3 out of 4 stars, writing, "Until the last section, the Safdies do a great job selecting and editing footage that tells their story intelligently and passionately." Scott Foundas of Variety stated that "Despite the stop-and-go production history, the Safdies have created a seamless end product, even as it evolves from the crude analog video of the early scenes to the more polished HD look of later ones." Eric Kohn of IndieWire gave the film an A− grade, writing, "Despite the odd nature of the project, Cooke fits nicely within the stable of characters populating the directors' work." Ignatiy Vishnevetsky of The A.V. Club gave the film a B+ grade, commenting that "It shares with their fiction work a ragged visual sensibility, a bittersweet worldview, and a low-key, moment-to-moment approach to drama."
