= Heaven Knows What =

2014 drama film directed by the Safdie brothers

- Theatrical release poster
- Directed by: Josh Safdie; Benny Safdie
- Written by: Josh Safdie; Ronald Bronstein
- Based on: Mad Love in New York City by Arielle Holmes
- Produced by: Oscar Boyson; Sebastian Bear McClard
- Starring: Arielle Holmes; Caleb Landry Jones; Buddy Duress; Necro; Eleonore Hendricks
- Cinematography: Sean Price Williams
- Edited by: Benny Safdie; Ronald Bronstein
- Music by: Ariel Pink; Paul Grimstad
- Production companies: Iconoclast; Elara Pictures
- Distributed by: Radius-TWC
- Release dates: August 29, 2014 (Venice); May 29, 2015 (United States)
- Running time: 94 minutes
- Countries: United States; France
- Language: English
- Box office: $84,417

Heaven Knows What is a 2014 psychological drama film directed by Josh and Benny Safdie and written by Joshua Safdie and Ronald Bronstein. It was based on the then-unpublished book Mad Love in New York City by Arielle Holmes. Starring Holmes, Buddy Duress and Caleb Landry Jones, it follows a homeless young group of heroin addicts in the streets of New York City.

Heaven Knows What had world premiere in the Horizons section of the 71st Venice International Film Festival on August 29, 2014, and was theatrically released in the United States on May 29, 2015, by Radius-TWC. The film received positive reviews from critics.

The film is dedicated to Ilya Leontyev (portrayed by Jones), Holmes' former boyfriend who was found dead after a drug overdose in Central Park in April 2015.

== Plot ==
Harley, a homeless heroin addict in New York City, has just been dumped by another homeless addict named Ilya for a recent infidelity, and he refuses to have anything to do with her. Desperate to win him back, Harley asks Ilya if he would forgive her if she died, to which he coldly replies yes. After buying razor blades with money earned panhandling, Ilya's friend Skully urges her to get over Ilya and leaves to steal liquor for her. While Skully is gone, Ilya returns and encourages her to kill herself. As she slits her wrist and bleeds, Ilya panics and calls for an ambulance, leading to Harley being admitted to a psychiatric hospital.

After being discharged, Harley is accompanied by Skully to meet up with her friend Mike, a low-level drug dealer. Annoyed at Skully's harassment, Harley soon drives him away to stay with Mike and use him as a source for heroin. Eventually, Ilya and Mike get into a fight at a park while Harley watches. After losing the fight, Ilya gets up and injures Mike with a makeshift shuriken. While recovering from his wound, Harley admits that she still loves Ilya, causing Mike to leave in frustration.

One night, Harley receives a phone call; Ilya is unconscious at a fast-food restaurant from a drug overdose. Harley rushes there and revives Ilya, causing them to passionately reconcile. They then board a bus for Miami. While Harley is sleeping, Ilya gets off the bus alone and enters a vacant house. At night while he sleeps, the candle near his bed causes a fire. Ilya wakes up and is burned alive.

Harley wakes up on the bus and notices Ilya is not there. Devastated, she gets off the bus and goes back to New York. She goes to another fast-food restaurant, where Mike is recounting the story of a fight he was in. Harley sits silently with Mike and his friends as he tells his story.

== Cast ==
- Arielle Holmes as Harley Boggs
- Buddy Duress as Mike
- Necro as Skully
- Eleonore Hendricks as Erica
- Caleb Landry Jones as Ilya
- Yuri Pleskun as Tommy

== Production ==
It is based on Mad Love in New York City, Holmes' unpublished memoir of her life as a homeless heroin addict living on the streets of New York City, where she was discovered by director Josh Safdie, who encouraged her to write the memoir.

== Release ==
The film premiered at the 71st Venice International Film Festival on August 29, 2014. On October 1, 2014, RADiUS-TWC acquired the film.

== Reception ==
Heaven Knows What received positive reviews from critics. On Rotten Tomatoes, the film has a rating of 89%, based on 70 reviews, with a rating of 7.4/10. The site's critical consensus reads: "Grueling and rewarding in equal measure, Heaven Knows What hits hard -- and serves as a powerful calling card for its captivating star, Arielle Holmes." On Metacritic, the film has a score of 75 out of 100, based on 22 critics, indicating "generally favorable" reviews.

Kenji Fujishima of Slant Magazine described the film as "one of the most harrowing cinematic depictions of drug addiction in recent memory, reliant less on formal gimmickry than on close observation of behavior." Jordan Hoffman of The Guardian gave it five stars out of five and praised Arielle Holmes' performance, saying: "While her accent is reminiscent of Linda Manz, her energy recalls Gena Rowlands in the best of Cassavetes' films." The film poster designed by Sarah Holmes and Shiri Eshel for Market Reactive, was named by IndieWire as one of the 15 best Indie Movie Posters of 2015. It was listed as one of the best 25 movies of that year by IndieWire.

David Rooney of The Hollywood Reporter noted that "[among] the film's most impressive qualities is the Safdie brothers' boldly textural use of music — predominantly Isao Tomita's electronica versions of Debussy, but also a little Tangerine Dream and James Dashow as well as some hardstyle and black metal." Nicolas Rapold of The New York Times commented that "[the] director of photography, Sean Price Williams, skillfully orchestrates lingering close-ups and up-the-street long shots, which are beautifully interwoven in the editing by Ronald Bronstein and Benny Safdie."

It won the Grand Prix and the Best Director award at the 27th Tokyo International Film Festival.
