= Arielle Holmes =

American actress and writer (born 1993)

- Born: September 17, 1993 (age 32); United States
- Occupations: Actress; writer
- Years active: 2014–2016

Arielle Holmes (born September 17, 1993) is an American actress and author. She is best known for starring as a semi-fictionalized version of herself in the film Heaven Knows What (2014), based on an at the time unpublished memoir she wrote at the behest of the film's directors, Josh and Benny Safdie.

== Early life ==
Holmes was born in the United States on September 17, 1993, the daughter of an American mother and Irish father. She grew up in Bayonne, New Jersey. She had her first experience with crack cocaine when she smoked it with her mother at the age of 12. She was raised by relatives in Bayonne after her mother died; her father had left the family while she was a baby. She dropped out of school in the 10th grade and moved to New York City to live with her boyfriend, Ilya Leontyev, but the two fell into heavy drug and alcohol abuse. Holmes first tried heroin at the age of 17, and was largely homeless for the next three years.

== Career ==
Holmes was scouted by Heaven Knows What (2014) directors Josh and Benny Safdie in Manhattan's Diamond District, while they were working on a different film that would eventually become Uncut Gems (2019). She had been hired as an unpaid intern by a jeweler who saw her sketching on a subway train. Intrigued by her life story, Josh hired her to write a memoir, for which she was paid per page. The resulting book, Mad Love in New York City, served as the basis for the screenplay of Heaven Knows What. The film was dedicated to Holmes' ex-boyfriend Leontyev, who was found dead of a drug overdose in Central Park in April 2015.

Holmes asked the Safdie brothers to help her get clean after completing Heaven Knows What, and she completed rehab at Lucida Treatment Center in Lantana, Florida. She later settled in Los Angeles. She appeared in the 2016 films American Honey and 2307: Winter's Dream.

== Filmography ==
=== Film ===
Year	Title	Role	Notes
2014	Heaven Knows What	Harley	Based on her memoir
2016	American Honey	Pagan	
2016	2307: Winter's Dream	Kix	

== Books ==
- Holmes, Arielle (2023). Mad Love in N.Y.C. ASIN B0C9S8SJMC. ISBN 9798850096830. OCLC 1437835958.
