= Lenny Cooke =

American basketball player

Personal information
- Born: April 29, 1982 (age 44) Atlantic City, New Jersey, U.S.
- Listed height: 6 ft 6 in (1.98 m)
- Listed weight: 206 lb (93 kg)

Career information
- High school: Franklin K. Lane (Brooklyn, New York); La Salle Academy (Manhattan, New York); Northern Valley Regional (Demarest, New Jersey); Northern Valley Regional (Old Tappan, New Jersey)
- NBA draft: 2002: undrafted
- Playing career: 2002–2006
- Position: Shooting guard

Career history
- 2003: Brooklyn Kings
- 2003–2004: Purefoods TJ Hotdogs
- 2003–2004: Shanghai Sharks
- 2004: Purefoods TJ Hotdogs
- 2005–2006: Rockford Lightning
- 2006: Minot Skyrockets

Career highlights
- All-USBL Second Team (2003); USBL Rookie of the Year (2003); USBL scoring champion (2003)

Leonard Cooke (born April 29, 1982) is an American former professional basketball player.

Born in Atlantic City, New Jersey, he is known primarily for having been ranked higher than LeBron James and Carmelo Anthony in 2001. He averaged 25 points, 10 rebounds, two steals, and two blocks per game in his junior year of high school. Following his junior year in high school, he averaged 31.5 points for the first eight games of his senior year. When he turned 19 in 2001, he was academically ineligible to play according to high school athletics' rules in his home county in New Jersey.

Cooke is the subject of the 2013 Tribeca Film Festival selected documentary film Lenny Cooke by the Safdie Brothers.

== Early life ==
Cooke was born to Vernon and Alfreda Hendrix (née Cooke): his mother gave birth to him before marrying, so he carried her maiden last name. Cooke has three younger siblings, brothers Vernon and Darius and sister Tierra. Cooke's mother worked as a dealer at the Trump Taj Mahal casino in Atlantic City, New Jersey, and he attended middle school there; the family later moved to Bushwick, a neighborhood of the New York City borough of Brooklyn, where they lived in a poverty-stricken block. Cooke's parents struggled to find employment, and the family lived in poor conditions: they could not afford to pay for heating, so that they had to use boiled water and an open oven to warm their house during winter.

== High school career ==
Cooke, who was already 6 ft 4 in (1.93 m) in 8th grade, enrolled at Franklin K. Lane High School, in Brooklyn: he struggled academically, and failed grade 9. He moved to La Salle Academy on the Lower East Side of Manhattan from 1999 to 2000 where he repeated grade 9 and attended the fall and spring terms of grade 10. At La Salle, Cooke was an all-city selection, averaging 20 points and 11 rebounds per game despite having started playing organized basketball only at the age of 16, when he was noticed by a friend while he was playing at a playground in Brooklyn and was invited by him to try out for the Long Island Panthers AAU team. When the building he and his family lived in was condemned, and in an attempt to improve his academics, Cooke moved in with a friend, Debbie Bortner, who was his summer league coach and the mother of one of his teammates at La Salle, and went to live in an affluent suburb in Old Tappan, Bergen County, New Jersey. The rest of his family moved to Virginia. He initially enrolled at Northern Valley Regional High School at Demarest and later at Northern Valley Regional High School at Old Tappan, and played under coach Kevin Brentnall. In the summer of 2000, Cooke earned Underclassmen MVP honors at the Adidas ABCD Camp. That summer he also played in the Rucker League, played at the Rucker Park in New York City, and was the second leading scorer, averaging 23 points along with 12 rebounds per game; during the competition he faced professional players like Stephon Marbury, Ray Allen, Zach Randolph and Omar Cook. Around this time, Cooke was diagnosed with a learning disability in the language area, and tested in high levels in matrix reasoning, meaning that he had advanced capabilities in activities like puzzle solving.

Cooke was a highly regarded young basketball player in high school, in the various basketball camps, and the AAU and tournaments. At one point he was considered one of the top recruits in the country, along with rival contemporaries like LeBron James, Carmelo Anthony, and Amar'e Stoudemire. ESPN ranked him as the second best senior in his class behind Anthony and before future NBA players like Stoudemire, Raymond Felton and Chris Bosh. Joakim Noah was one of his close friends. One of the featured anecdotes of the biographical movie Lenny Cooke was the 2001 ABCD Camp matchup between Cooke, the NYC area phenom and defending camp MVP, versus the lesser-known phenom from "nowhere" LeBron James, in which LeBron effectively supplanted Cooke as the most highly regarded prospect in the country. At the 2001 ABCD Camp, Cooke averaged 16.5 points, 5.4 rebounds, 2.9 assists, 1.1 steals and 0.9 blocks.

At the end of the 2001–02 school year, Cooke had a year left to graduate, but had exhausted his high school basketball eligibility. In the 8 games he played in his senior season at Northern Valley, Cooke averaged 31.5 points and 15 rebounds per game. Against the advice of Bortner, he chose to transfer to Mott Adult High School in Flint, Michigan, where he worked to get his equivalency diploma and work on his basketball game. Ineligible for school play, he was confined to pickup games and tournaments.

On March 8, 2002, he scored 21 points to help the Eastern Conference defeat the West 115–103, at the EA Sports Roundball Classic at the United Center in Chicago. At that point, he was rated #4 High School Player in the United States in the Prep Stars Recruiter's Handbook.

== Professional career ==
=== Brooklyn Kings (2003) ===
At the end of the 2001–02 school year, Cooke had multiple options for basketball: North Carolina, Seton Hall, St. John's, Miami and Ohio State. He professed a preference for St John's in the NYC area, but it was never clear whether he would have been eligible. (Note: His academic record was spotty, and reportedly he had never bothered to take college entrance exams such as the SAT or ACT.)

Amid enticing agent promises that explicitly stated a dozen NBA teams were seriously considering him and at least three guaranteed they would take him in the 1st round if he were available, Cooke chose to bypass college and declare himself eligible for the 2002 NBA draft, a decision that ended his eligibility to play college basketball. Cooke participated in the Chicago Pre-Draft Camp, where he was measured at 6 ft 5.5 in (1.97 m) without shoes, 6 ft 6.5 in (1.99 m) with shoes, with a 7 ft 1 in (2.16 m) wingspan; during the camp he injured his big toe and this limited his performance at the camp to only one game.

To his surprise and disappointment, in the 2002 NBA Draft, all 29 NBA teams passed on Cooke in both rounds. Because he was not selected, Cooke became a free agent, eligible to sign with any NBA team that wanted him. (Note: According to the NBA Collective Bargaining Agreement, any potential player who wants to play in the NBA must go through the draft selection process once. If unselected, as Cooke was, a player then becomes a free agent, with the ability to negotiate and sign his first NBA deal with any team at any time.)

That summer, after being bypassed in the NBA Draft, he played in the Rucker Park Summer League in New York for the Terror Squad team. Later in 2002, Cooke was drafted by the Columbus Riverdragons of the NBDL in the 11th round (87th pick) of the 2002 National Basketball Development League draft. In April 2003, he tried out for the Brevard Blue Ducks of the USBL, and in May 2003 was signed by the USBL's Brooklyn Kings. In 15 games, he averaged 28.8 points, 9.3 rebounds, 1.3 assists and 2.8 steals per game, winning the USBL Rookie of the Year award, being selected in the All-USBL Second Team and leading the league in points average, offensive rebounds (4.7) and steals per game (2.8). He scored a season-high 53 points against the Adirondack Wildcats on June 22, 2003.

=== Purefoods TJ Hotdogs (2003–2004) ===
Cooke played well enough with the Kings that the Boston Celtics invited him to play on their summer league team for the 2003 Reebok Pro Summer League, but that was the closest he ever came to playing in the NBA. While he played in several games, to his lasting disappointment he didn't get in the game when his team played the Cleveland Cavaliers' summer league squad featuring their just-drafted LeBron James. Later in the summer of 2003, Cooke returned to play in the Rucker Park Summer League.

In the 2003–04 basketball season, he first played in the Philippine Basketball Association for the Purefoods TJ Hotdogs: during the 2003 PBA Reinforced Conference, Cooke averaged 37.9 points and 17.1 rebounds per game, leading the league in both statistical categories.

=== Shanghai Sharks (2003–2004) ===
Cooke then had a stint with the Shanghai Dongfang Sharks, where he averaged 28.3 points, 11.6 rebounds and 1.5 assists per game over 13 appearances in the 2003–04 Chinese Basketball Association season.

=== Return to Purefoods (2004) ===
In the 2004–05 basketball season, Cooke returned to the PBA's Purefoods team but tore his Achilles' tendon, ending his season.

=== Rockford Lightning (2005–2006) ===
In 2005–06, Cooke played for the Rockford Lightning of the Continental Basketball Association (CBA) and averaged 3.9 points, 1.5 rebounds and 0.5 assists over 20 games (7.4 minutes per game).

=== Minot Skyrockets (2006) ===
In 2006–07, Cooke played 13 games for the Minot Skyrockets, averaging 10.3 points, 5.9 rebounds and 1.6 assists before blowing out his other Achilles' tendon, ending his career.

== Legacy ==
Late in the summer of 2005, the NBA changed its rules to prevent future players from jumping directly from high school to the NBA by requiring all its players to be at least 19 years old and one year removed from their high school graduations. One-time phenoms like Cooke, whose development was stunted by a haste to get to the NBA too quickly, are considered to be the impetus for the change.

Cooke is the subject of the 2013 documentary Lenny Cooke which documents his athletic rise, fall, and subsequent life after basketball. The film, made by the Safdie Brothers, was entered in the 2013 Tribeca Film Festival.

== Personal life ==
=== Family ===
According to the New York Post, Cooke has seven children, including his eldest son, Anahijae Cook (born March 9, 2000), who also played basketball at the high school level. He has been married and divorced.

=== 2001–2002 ===
When Cooke's fame was at its peak, he was hanging out with celebrities like Fat Joe and Foxy Brown and was a regular at Club Chaos and Cheetahs Gentlemen’s Club. He owned a Lincoln Navigator (which was later repossessed) and had a line of credit drawn against his future earnings. When Cooke decided to sign with an agent before the draft, he was given $350,000 in cash at a hotel meeting. Cooke spent all of the money within 18 months. First, he bought every home and away jersey at the NBA Store. Then, he went to Jacob the Jeweler and bought a $10,000 watch. Later, he bought a house and a car for his mother.

=== Car accident ===
Cooke was in a car accident in December 2004 that resulted in a broken shin, broken femur, and months of using a wheelchair for mobility. Cooke says that if Master P hadn't paid for the surgery, his left leg would have been amputated. The accident occurred in Beverly Hills where his Long Beach Jam teammate, Nick Sheppard, was driving and lost control of his car, crashing into a light post. Cooke spent a week in a coma and underwent two surgeries to have a pair of rods inserted into his leg that stretched from his hip to his ankle.

=== Post-basketball career ===
Cooke never obtained a college degree but was briefly enrolled at Atlantic City Community College.

In 2008, he signed with a basketball team in Kuwait, but decided instead to retire and return to Virginia. The injuries resulting from the car crash and the two Achilles injuries caused Cooke's weight to eventually shoot up to 320 pounds. After retiring from basketball, Cooke found a job with a food distributorship. In 2016, he returned to basketball as an assistant coach at Atlantic City High School and Middle Township, in addition to working at basketball camps and clinics. He also works as a motivational speaker, sharing his mistakes with a younger generation. Additionally, he has worked as an impact specialist at Volunteers of America, helping homeless people and recently released inmates reintegrate into society, and hosts local gun violence awareness events.

He has aspirations of going to culinary school and dreams of one day owning his own restaurant and food trucks.
