= Safdie brothers =

American filmmakers

Josh and Benny Safdie
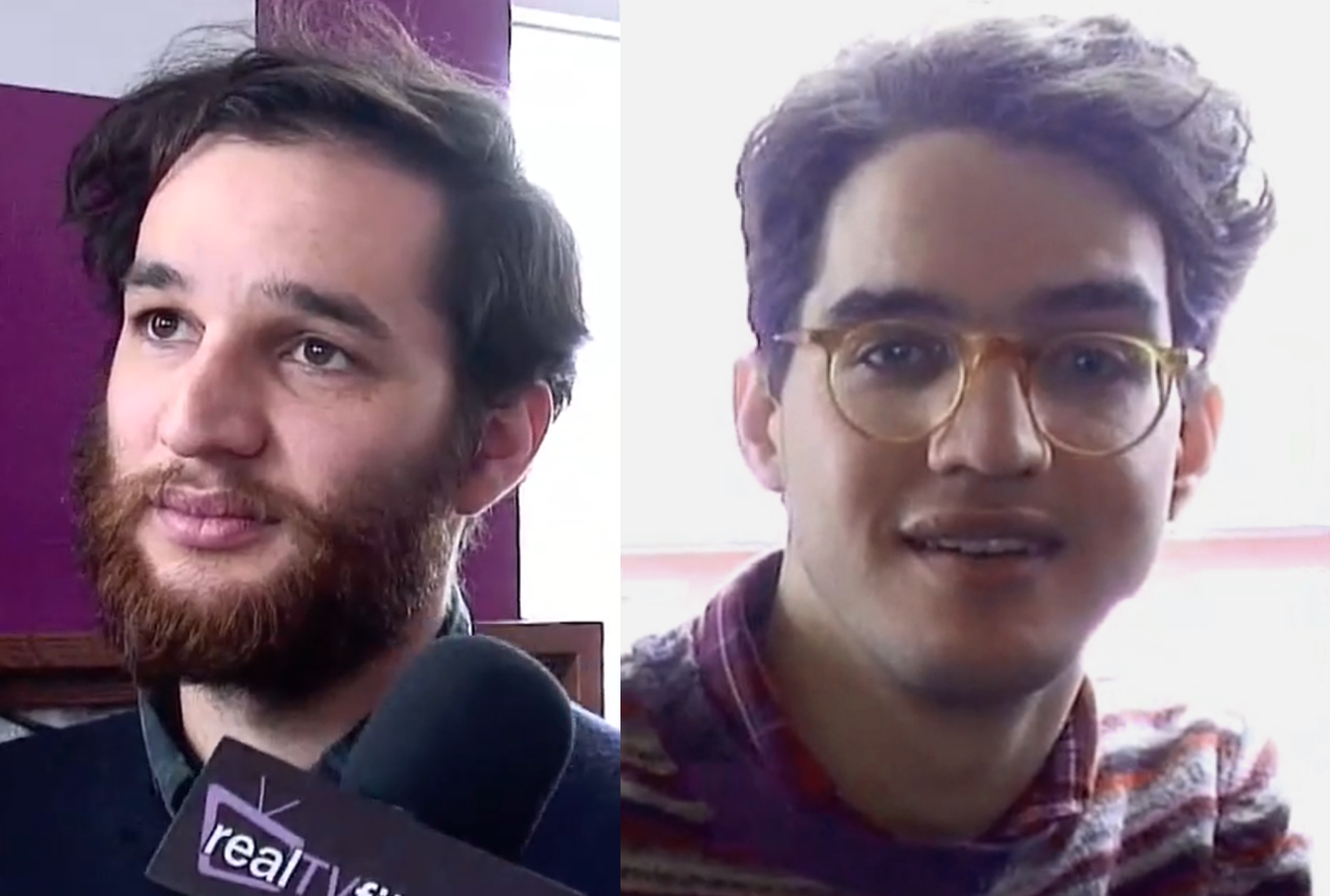
- Josh (left) and Benny being interviewed at the 2010 Sundance Film Festival
- Born: Joshua Safdie; April 3, 1984 (age 42) Benjamin Safdie; February 24, 1986 (age 40); New York City, U.S.
- Education: Boston University
- Occupations: Filmmakers; directors; editors; actors
- Years active: 2007–present
- Spouses: Benny: Ava Safdie (m. 2013); Josh: Sara Rossein
- Children: Benny: 2, Josh: 2
- Relatives: Moshe Safdie (great-uncle); Oren Safdie (first cousin once removed); Dov Charney (first cousin once removed)
- Awards: Full list
- Website: elara.world

The Safdie brothers, Joshua Safdie (born April 3, 1984) and Benjamin Safdie (born February 24, 1986), are American filmmakers and actors based in New York City who have frequently collaborated on their films. They are best known for writing and directing the crime thriller films Good Time (2017), starring Robert Pattinson, and Uncut Gems (2019), starring Adam Sandler.

In addition to writing and directing, both Josh and Benny serve in a variety of key positions including acting, editing, shooting, mixing sound, and producing their films. They have also frequently collaborated with Ronald Bronstein, who co-wrote and edited their narrative features together between 2009 and 2019. Other recurring collaborators include composer Oneohtrix Point Never, cinematographer Sean Price Williams, and production designer Sam Lisenco.

In January 2024, Benny revealed that the brothers would no longer be directing projects together, as they expanded to solo careers. Benny also stated he "didn't know" if he would direct a film with his brother again.

== Early life ==
The Safdie brothers were raised in New York, the children of Amy and Alberto Safdie. They spent their childhood living between their father in Queens and their mother and stepfather in Manhattan. The Safdie brothers are Jewish. Their father, who is a Sephardic Jew of Syrian-Jewish descent, was raised in France and in Italy. Their mother is an Ashkenazi Jew of Russian-Jewish descent.

They began making films at a young age, inspired by their film enthusiast father, Alberto. They graduated from Columbia Grammar & Preparatory School in Manhattan. At Boston University, they co-founded the creative collective Red Bucket Films with Alex Kalman, Sam Lisenco, Brett Jutkiewicz, and Zachary Treitz. Josh and Benny Safdie graduated from Boston University College of Communication in 2007 and 2008, respectively. They claim "turmoil of their youth", as children of divorced parents, became an inspiration for later work. Famed Israeli-Canadian architect Moshe Safdie is their great uncle; his son, playwright Oren Safdie, is their first cousin once removed.

The brothers grew up as fans of basketball and the New York Knicks. The duo try to watch every game together. Basketball is prominently featured in Lenny Cooke and Uncut Gems.

== Career ==
=== The Pleasure of Being Robbed ===
In 2007, Josh Safdie was hired by Andy Spade and Anthony Sperduti to create a short film featuring Kate Spade handbags. He devised a concise story about the adventures of a kleptomaniac woman. Eleonore Hendricks, who co-wrote the screenplay, portrayed the lead role. The project eventually turned into a feature film. The film, titled The Pleasure of Being Robbed, had its world premiere at the 2008 South by Southwest. It also screened in the Directors' Fortnight section at the 2008 Cannes Film Festival, along with a short film The Acquaintances of a Lonely John directed by Benny Safdie.

=== Daddy Longlegs ===
Their second feature film, Daddy Longlegs, had its world premiere under the title Go Get Some Rosemary in the Directors' Fortnight section at the 2009 Cannes Film Festival. Starring Ronald Bronstein, it was inspired by the filmmakers' younger years living with their father, Alberto. Bronstein won the Breakthrough Actor Award at the Gotham Independent Film Awards 2010. The film won the John Cassavetes Award at the 26th Independent Spirit Awards.

=== Lenny Cooke ===
Their first full-length documentary, Lenny Cooke, follows the life of Lenny Cooke, a once-phenom high school basketball player, from adolescence to manhood. The film premiered at the 2013 Tribeca Film Festival.

=== Heaven Knows What ===
In 2014, the Safdie Brothers directed Heaven Knows What under their Elara Pictures banner. The film centers around the real-life stories written in a book titled Mad Love in New York City by lead actress Arielle Holmes. The film had its world premiere at the 71st Venice International Film Festival. It also screened at the Toronto International Film Festival, the New York Film Festival, and the Tokyo International Film Festival.

=== Good Time ===
The Safdies directed the 2017 crime film Good Time, starring Robert Pattinson and Benny Safdie as siblings. The film was selected to compete for the Palme d'Or in the main competition section at the 2017 Cannes Film Festival.

=== Uncut Gems ===
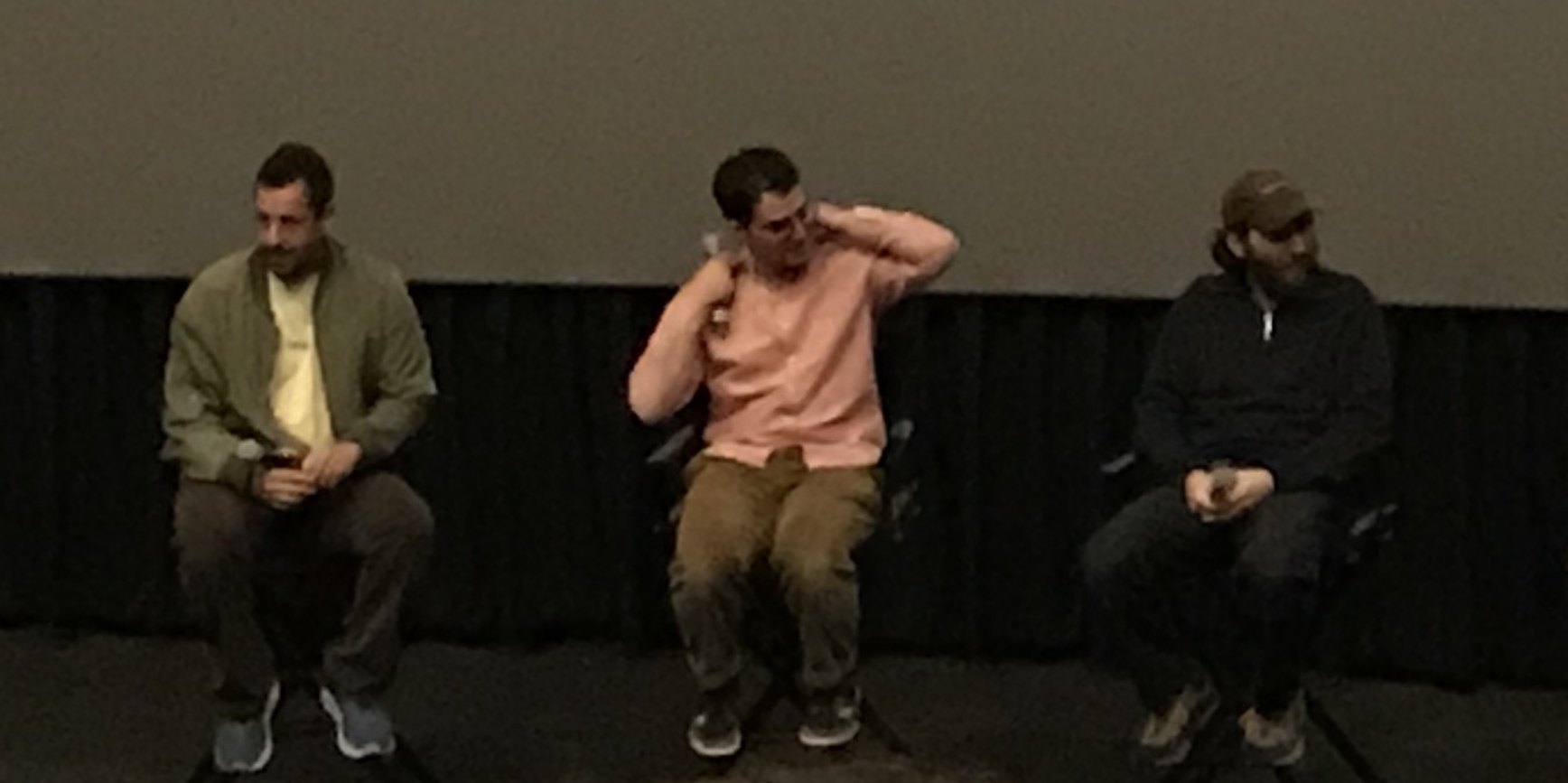
The Safdies (center and right) with Adam Sandler in December 2019

The Safdies directed Uncut Gems, starring Adam Sandler, with Martin Scorsese serving as an executive producer. The film was inspired by their father's time working in the Manhattan Diamond District. It had its world premiere at the 2019 Telluride Film Festival. Theatrically released in the United States in 2019, it received critical acclaim and became one of A24's highest-grossing releases.

=== Split and solo projects ===
In December 2017, The Hollywood Reporter announced that the Safdies would helm a remake of 48 Hrs. with the script being written by Josh Safdie, Ronald Bronstein, and Jerrod Carmichael. In December 2019, the Safdies elaborated in an interview with The A.V. Club, saying the film was still being made but it would no longer be a remake. Their script would instead be "re-shifted into something original." In 2025, Josh Safdie said the film was dead: "we wrote a remake of 48 Hrs. for Paramount, and they read it, and they were like, ‘This isn’t a remake, what is this? This is an original film.’ We’re like, ‘Sorry, we tried.’"

In February 2020, Showtime ordered a pilot for The Curse, a show about the making of an HGTV-style reality series, starring Emma Stone, Nathan Fielder and Benny Safdie. Fielder co-created and co-wrote the show with Benny.

In April 2022, it was reported by IndieWire that the Safdies were working with Sandler on a new project. Megan Thee Stallion was in talks to co-star. The project would've focused on baseball and, more specifically, baseball card memorabilia; however, production stalled as a result of the 2023 Hollywood labor disputes. Additionally, Benny decided he would not co-direct the film. In January 2024, Benny revealed that the brothers would no longer be directing projects together, as they expanded to solo careers. Benny also stated he "didn't know" if he would direct a film with his brother again.

=== Elara Pictures ===
The Safdies co-founded the production company Elara Pictures in 2014. The company produced the Safdies' feature films Heaven Knows What, Good Time, and Uncut Gems, Owen Kline's feature film directorial debut Funny Pages, and the Showtime television series The Curse. Due to sexual misconduct allegations against Sebastian Bear-McClard and the Safdie brothers’ split, the fate of Elara remains unknown.

=== Central Pictures ===
Central Pictures is a production company founded by Josh Safdie, Ronald Bronstein, and Eli Bush in 2024. They produced films such as If I Had Legs I'd Kick You, Marty Supreme, and the upcoming The Land of Nod.

=== Out for the Count Productions ===
Out for The Count Productions is a production company founded by Benny Safdie in 2024, known for producing The Smashing Machine and the upcoming Lizard Music.

== Influences ==
Their artistic influences included the cinematic works of John Cassavetes, Martin Scorsese and Quentin Tarantino as well as underground comix artist Robert Crumb and author Irvine Welsh.

Benny named Robert Bresson's A Man Escaped as his favorite film of all time, and Josh named Vittorio De Sica's Bicycle Thieves as his favorite.

== Filmography ==
=== Feature films ===
Key
| † | Denotes films that have not yet been released |

| Year | Title | Director | Writer | Producer | DoP | Editor |
|---|---|---|---|---|---|---|
| 2008 | The Pleasure of Being Robbed | Josh | Josh | Josh | Josh | Yes |
| 2009 | Daddy Longlegs | Yes | Yes | No | Josh | Yes |
| 2013 | Lenny Cooke | Yes | No | No | Josh | Benny |
| 2014 | Heaven Knows What | Yes | Josh | No | No | Benny |
| 2017 | Good Time | Yes | Josh | No | No | Benny |
| 2019 | Uncut Gems | Yes | Yes | No | No | Benny |
| 2025 | The Smashing Machine | Benny | Benny | Benny | No | Benny |
| 2025 | Marty Supreme | Josh | Josh | Josh | No | Josh |

=== Producers only ===
| Film | Year | Producers |
|---|---|---|
| Funny Pages | 2022 | Yes |
| If I Had Legs I'd Kick You | 2025 | Josh |

=== Short films ===
| Year | Title | Director | Writer | Producer | DoP | Editor |
|---|---|---|---|---|---|---|
| 2002 | Lethargy | Josh | Josh | No | No | No |
| 2005 | I Think I'm Missing Parts | Josh | Josh | No | No | No |
| 2005 | The Ralph Handel Story | Yes | No | No | No | No |
| 2006 | We're Going to the Zoo | Josh | Josh | Josh | No | No |
| 2007 | The Back of Her Head | Josh | Yes | Josh | No | No |
| 2007 | Jerry Ruis, Shall We Do This? | Josh | No | No | No | No |
| 2007 | John's Lonely Trip to Coney Island | Yes | No | No | Josh | Benny |
| 2008 | The Acquaintances of a Lonely John | Benny | Benny | Benny | No | Benny |
| 2008 | There's Nothing You Can Do | Yes | No | No | No | No |
| 2010 | John's Gone | Yes | Yes | Yes | Josh | Yes |
| 2011 | Straight Hustle | Yes | Yes | No | No | No |
| 2011 | Buttons | Yes | Yes | No | No | No |
| 2012 | The Black Balloon | Yes | Yes | No | No | Benny |
| 2012 | Trophy Hunter | Yes | Yes | No | Josh | Josh |
| 2013 | Solid Gold | Yes | No | No | Josh | No |
| 2016 | Toback Vs. Mailer: The Incident | Yes | Yes | No | No | Benny |
| 2020 | Goldman v Silverman | Yes | Uncredited | No | Josh | No |
| 2020 | Question & Answer | Yes | Yes | No | No | Yes |

=== Television ===
| Year | Title | Director | Writer | Producer | Notes |
|---|---|---|---|---|---|
| 2023 | Telemarketers | No | No | Executive | Documentary mini-series |
| 2023 | Love Has Won: The Cult of Mother God | No | No | Executive | Documentary mini-series |
| 2023–2024 | The Curse | No | Benny | Executive | Co-creator, miniseries |
| 2024 | Ren Faire | No | No | Executive | Documentary mini-series |
| 2024 | Adam Sandler: Love You | Josh | No | Josh | Netflix comedy special |

=== Josh as an actor ===
| Year | Title | Role | Notes |
|---|---|---|---|
| 2006 | We're Going to the Zoo | The Hitchhiker | Short film |
| 2006 | The Ralph Handel Story | The Director (voice) | Short film |
| 2007 | The Back of Her Head | Him | Short film |
| 2008 | The Pleasure of Being Robbed | Josh | |
| 2008 | Yeast | Riverguy 1 | |
| 2009 | Taking Woodstock | Documentary Cameraman | Uncredited |
| 2009 | Daddy Longlegs | Chris | |
| 2009 | La corsa | Alessandro | Short film |
| 2013 | Lydia Hoffman Lydia Hoffman | Bruce | Short film |
| 2013 | Hellaware | Gallery Patron | |
| 2013 | Stand Clear of the Closing Doors | Fighter | |
| 2015 | This Summer Feeling | Thomas | |
| 2016 | Togetherness | Craddock Brother #1 | Episode: "Advanced Pretend" |
| 2016 | My Art | Tom | |
| 2017 | Ezer Kenegdo | Levi | |

=== Benny as an actor ===
Key
| † | Denotes films that have not yet been released |

Film

| Year | Title | Role | Director | Notes |
|---|---|---|---|---|
| 2017 | Person to Person | Eugene | Dustin Guy Defa | |
| 2017 | Good Time | Nick Nikas | Safdie brothers | |
| 2020 | Pieces of a Woman | Chris | Kornél Mundruczó | |
| 2021 | Licorice Pizza | Joel Wachs | Paul Thomas Anderson | |
| 2022 | Stars at Noon | CIA Man | Claire Denis | |
| 2023 | Are You There God? It's Me, Margaret. | Herb Simon | Kelly Fremon Craig | |
| 2023 | Oppenheimer | Edward Teller | Christopher Nolan | |
| 2025 | Happy Gilmore 2 | Frank Manatee | Kyle Newacheck | |
| 2026 | The Super Mario Galaxy Movie | Bowser Jr. (voice) | Aaron Horvath; Michael Jelenic | |
| 2026 | The Odyssey | Agamemnon | Christopher Nolan | |

Television

| Year | Title | Role | Notes |
|---|---|---|---|
| 2016 | Togetherness | Craddock Brother #2 | 1 episode |
| 2022 | Obi-Wan Kenobi | Nari | Miniseries, 1 episode |
| 2023–2024 | The Curse | Dougie Schecter | Main role, also co-creator, writer, executive producer and editor |

=== Music videos ===
| Year | Artist | Title | Album | Role | Ref. |
|---|---|---|---|---|---|
| 2015 | Ariel Pink | "I Need a Minute" | Heaven Knows What: Original Music From the Film | Directors | |
| 2017 | Jay-Z | "Marcy Me" | 4:44 | Directors | |
| 2017 | Oneohtrix Point Never | "The Pure and the Damned" | Good Time (Original Motion Picture Soundtrack) | Directors | |
| 2019 | Brockhampton | "Sugar" | Ginger | Producers | |
| 2020 | Oneohtrix Point Never | "Lost But Never Alone" | Magic Oneohtrix Point Never | Directors | |
