= Person to Person (film) =

2017 American drama film by Dustin Guy Defa

- Theatrical release poster
- Directed by: Dustin Guy Defa
- Written by: Dustin Guy Defa
- Produced by: Toby Halbrooks; James M. Johnston; Sara Murphy
- Starring: Michael Cera; Tavi Gevinson; Abbi Jacobson
- Cinematography: Ashley Connor
- Edited by: Dustin Guy Defa
- Production companies: Bow and Arrow Entertainment; Park Pictures; Forager Film
- Distributed by: Magnolia Pictures
- Release dates: January 20, 2017 (Sundance); July 28, 2017 (United States)
- Running time: 84 minutes
- Country: United States
- Language: English

Person to Person is a 2017 American drama film directed and written by Dustin Guy Defa. The film stars Michael Cera, Tavi Gevinson, and Abbi Jacobson.

The film had its world premiere at the Sundance Film Festival on January 20, 2017. It was released on July 28, 2017, by Magnolia Pictures.

== Plot ==
During a day in New York City, a reporter trains a new employee while covering a story about a possible murder where a watch repairman may have important information; a record collector finds a rare piece of vinyl; two brothers track down their sister's ex-boyfriend who posted nude pictures of her online, and a questioning teenage girl explores her feelings when she kisses a boy.

== Cast ==
- Abbi Jacobson as Claire
- Michael Cera as Phil
- Tavi Gevinson as Wendy
- Bene Coopersmith as Benny
- George Sample III as Ray
- Philip Baker Hall as Jimmy
- Isiah Whitlock, Jr. as Buster
- Michaela Watkins as The Widow
- Olivia Luccardi as Melanie
- Ben Rosenfield as River
- Buddy Duress as Paul
- Eleonore Hendricks as Francis
- Benny Safdie as Eugene
- Marsha Stephanie Blake as Janet
- Okieriete Onaodowan as Lester
- Brian Tyree Henry as Mike
- Marvin Gurewitz as Oscar
- Steve Urbanski as Gary
- Craig Butta as Darryl
- Dakota O'Hara as Ron
- David Zellner as Kent

== Production ==
Defa wrote and directed the 2014 short film Person to Person, which starred his former roommate Bene Coopersmith and was shot on 16mm film. Defa adapted the short into a feature, which was originally titled Human People, and was announced on December 3, 2015, with principal photography to take place in New York City. It was photographed on 16mm film.

== Release ==
The film had its world premiere at the Sundance Film Festival on January 20, 2017. Shortly after, Magnolia Pictures acquired distribution rights to the film. It was given a limited release on July 28, 2017.

== Critical reception ==
Person to Person holds a 52% approval rating on the review aggregator website Rotten Tomatoes, based on 46 reviews, with a weighted average of 4.93/10. The site's consensus reads: "Person to Person's moments of insight and absorbing character development are scattered among an aimless, disjointed narrative".

Christy Lemire from RogerEbert.com gave the film 1.5/4 stars, noting "Various characters populate “Person to Person,” but they rarely register as actual people. And while some of their storylines intersect throughout the course of a day in New York, they rarely connect in ways that have actual meaning."
