= Mumblecore =

Film subgenre

- Years active: 2002–present
- Location: United States
- Major figures: Andrew Bujalski; Mark Duplass; Jay Duplass; Greta Gerwig; Aaron Katz; Alex Ross Perry; Ry Russo-Young; Lynn Shelton; Joe Swanberg; Sophia Takal; Lawrence Michael Levine; Adam Wingard; Dia Sokol Savage
- Influences: Independent film; DIY culture; Dogme 95; European art cinema; reality television

Mumblecore is a subgenre of independent film characterized by naturalistic acting and (sometimes improvised) dialogue, low budgets, an emphasis on dialogue over plot, and a focus on the personal relationships of young adults. Filmmakers associated with the genre include Andrew Bujalski, Lynn Shelton, the Duplass brothers Mark and Jay, Greta Gerwig, Aaron Katz, Joe Swanberg, and Ry Russo-Young. In many cases, though, these directors reject the term. The genre is a mostly American phenomenon. The related term mumblegore has been used for films mixing the mumblecore and horror genres.

== Distinguishing characteristics ==
Naturalism – both in performance and dialogue – is a key feature of almost all mumblecore films. Early mumblecore films tended to feature non-professional actors; however, later films have had more professional actors, including major stars such as Anna Kendrick (Drinking Buddies and Happy Christmas) and Orlando Bloom (Digging for Fire). Some mumblecore films feature a prominent use of improvisation, with the cast sharing script credits, though some, like Andrew Bujalski's films, are mostly scripted.

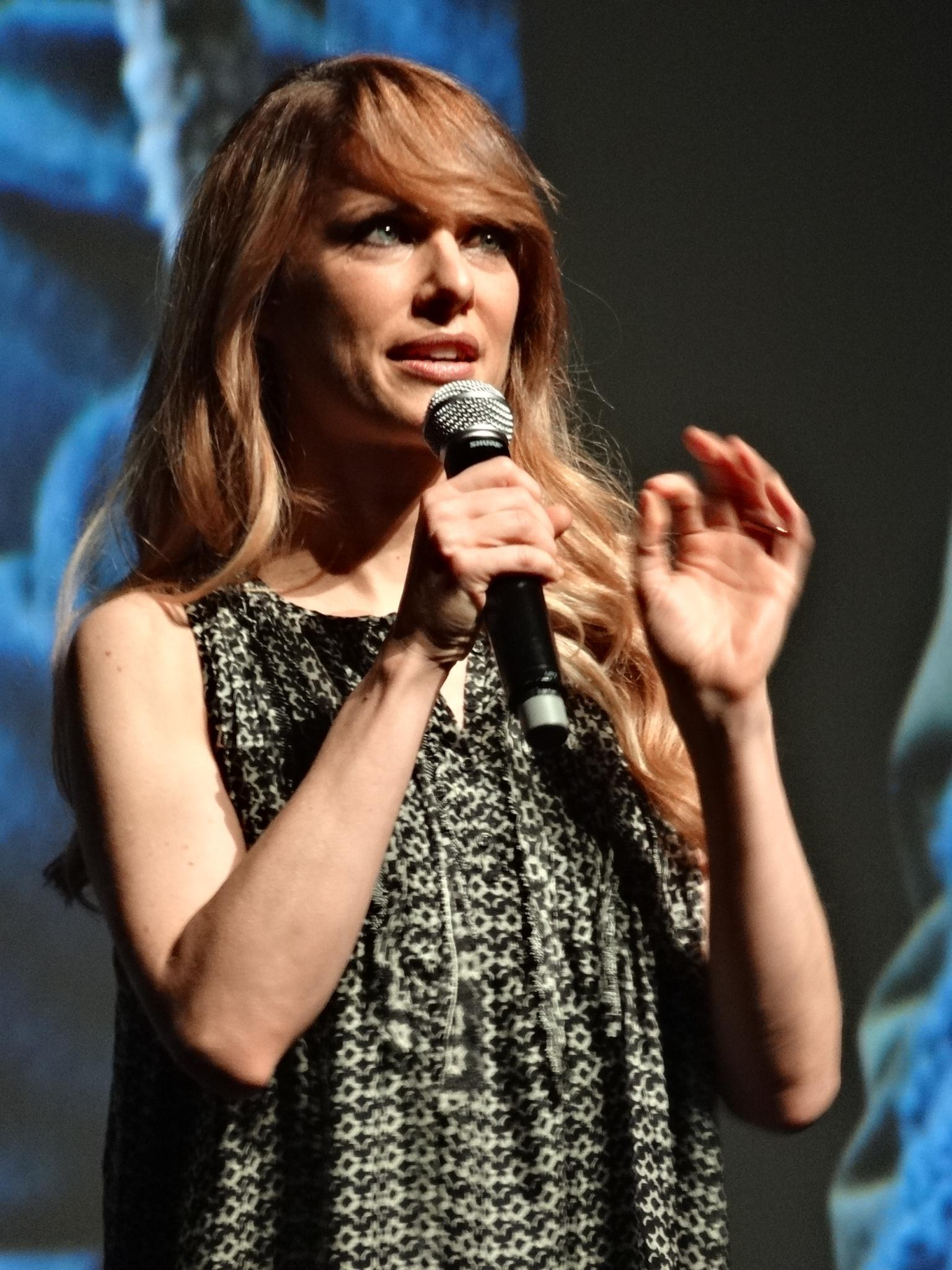
Director Lynn Shelton in 2012

Mumblecore films are generally produced with a low budget, which has ranged from several thousand to several million dollars as well as low production values. Filming is done in real places, as opposed to studio sets or sound stages. Many of these films are shot digitally, although Bujalski's films have all been shot on film.

Mumblecore films tend to revolve around characters in their twenties and early thirties who are usually single, white, and fairly aimless in both their professional and personal lives. Plots are often concerned with difficulties in romantic relationships, exacerbated by the characters' inability to articulate their own desires.

== Influences on mumblecore ==
Films that have been described as influencing, or at least anticipating, the conventions of mumblecore include Girlfriends (1978), Manhattan (1979), My Dinner with Andre (1981), Stranger Than Paradise (1984), Sex, Lies, and Videotape (1989), Slacker (1991), Clerks (1994), Go Fish (1994) and Before Sunrise (1995). Directors cited as influences include Michelangelo Antonioni, Eric Rohmer, Andrei Tarkovsky, Gus Van Sant, Richard Linklater, and John Cassavetes.

Reality television, including what one critic called "the spring-break psychodrama of MTV's The Real World", has also been called an influence on mumblecore, as has the 2001 BBC reality-TV-style mockumentary series The Office.

Another often-cited influence on mumblecore is the profusion of cheaper filmmaking technology starting in the early 2000s, such as the Panasonic AG-DVX100 video camera, and desktop video editing software such as Final Cut Pro.

== History ==
Bujalski has been described as the "Godfather of Mumblecore". His 2002 directorial debut, Funny Ha Ha, is generally considered to be the first mumblecore film.

The 2005 South by Southwest Film Festival screened a number of other films that came to be considered part of the mumblecore movement, including Bujalski's second film, Mutual Appreciation; The Puffy Chair, by Mark and Jay Duplass; and Kissing on the Mouth, by Joe Swanberg. That festival was also the origin of the term "mumblecore": Eric Masunaga, a sound editor who has worked with Bujalski, coined the term one night at a bar during the festival, when asked to describe the similarities between those three films. The term was first used publicly by Bujalski in an interview with IndieWire. Bujalski has downplayed the existence of an organized "movement", however, and stated that he does not intentionally make "mumblecore" films.

Film journalists have also referred to the genre collectively with the terms "bedhead cinema" and "Slackavetes" (a portmanteau derived from the title of Richard Linklater's dialogue-heavy, lo-fi 1990s film Slacker, and the name of independent film director John Cassavetes).

In 2007, the IFC Center in New York City exhibited a ten-film series of mumblecore films, titled "The New Talkies: Generation D.I.Y." The films shown were: Hannah Takes the Stairs, Funny Ha Ha, Kissing on the Mouth, The Puffy Chair, Dance Party USA, Quiet City, Hohokam, Team Picture, Mutual Appreciation, LOL, and Quietly on By, as well as the first season of Joe Swanberg and Kris Williams's web series Young American Bodies, and a collection of short films dubbed "Mumbleshorts".

== Legacy ==
Some critics have stated that mumblecore ended around 2010, as the original crop of directors began making films with larger budgets, more diverse storylines, and a more conventional cinematic approach. For this reason, films made since 2010 or so that retain an emphasis on naturalistic dialogue and plot are sometimes referred to as "post-mumblecore". People who have been labelled as "post-mumblecore" include Amy Seimetz, Sean Price Williams, Alex Karpovsky, Alex Ross Perry and Kate Lyn Sheil.

=== Influences on other genres ===
The big-budget films Magic Mike (2012) and its sequel Magic Mike XXL (2015) have been described as having mumblecore elements due to their use of naturalistic dialogue. Some TV series, including the HBO series Girls (2012–2017), Looking (2014–2016) and Togetherness (2015–2016), Euphoria (2019–2026), and the Netflix series Easy (2017–2019) have been called mumblecore-inspired, or, in the words of one critic, "mumbleshows".

Horror films using mumblecore techniques have resulted in the term "mumblegore." Films that have been described as "mumblegore" include Baghead (2008), The House of the Devil (2009), Entrance (2011), You're Next (2011), V/H/S (2012), The Sacrament (2013), and Creep (2014). Directors associated with mumblegore cinema include Swanberg and Duplass, as well as Adam Wingard, Roxanne Benjamin, Ben Wheatley, the trio Radio Silence, Patrick Brice, Patrick Horvath, and Ti West.

A review of the independent quasi-documentary Bloody Nose, Empty Pockets (2020), in which actors were served real alcohol and filmed interacting in improvised scenes in a recreated dive bar, noted that "the film may be the first-ever in a new 'stumblecore' genre, a risky fusion of indie-mumblecore and on-camera drunkenness."

=== Outside the United States ===
Mumblecore is not a strictly American phenomenon. Since about 2009, the Berlin Mumblecore movement has had its own manifesto, Sehr gutes Manifest. Berlin Mumblecore is not a reaction to the American hype so much as it is a reaction to the lack of reform in the German public financial support system for the film industry (Filmförderung). Crowdfunding became a new possibility to finance movie productions with small budgets, independently from restrictions of the German Filmförderung.

In 2009, Jette Miller's Austern ohne Schale was screened in Berlin. In 2011, the movies Frontalwatte by Jakob Lass and Papa Gold by Tom Lass were released. The latter won several German film awards. In 2012, Klappe Cowboy by Timo Jacobs and Ulf Behrens premiered, as well as the award-winning Heavy Girls by Axel Ranisch. In 2015, Malte Wirtz's Voll Paula! had its theatrical release, having also been produced without public film funding. Since then he produced three more Mumblecore Films (Hard & Ugly, Only One Day in Berlin, and About Rita!) and the media called him one of the most active German directors.

== Filmography ==
=== List of mumblecore films and television series ===
- Funny Ha Ha (2002)
- Kissing on the Mouth (2005)
- The Puffy Chair (2005)
- Mutual Appreciation (2005)
- Ellie Parker (2005)
- Dance Party USA (2006)
- LOL (2006)
- Young American Bodies (2006–2009)
- Hannah Takes the Stairs (2007)
- Let Them Chirp Awhile (2007)
- Quiet City (2007)
- Hohokam (2007)
- Orphans (2007)
- Frownland (2007)
- Team Picture (2007)
- Pop Skull (2007)
- Baghead (2008)
- In Search of a Midnight Kiss (2008)
- The Pleasure of Being Robbed (2008)
- Nights and Weekends (2008)
- My Effortless Brilliance (2008)
- Yeast (2008)
- Luke and Brie Are on a First Date (2008)
- It's Nick's Birthday (a mumblecore musical, 2009)
- Goodbye Promise (2009)
- Alexander the Last (2009)
- Medicine for Melancholy (2009)
- Humpday (2009)
- Beeswax (2009)
- Daddy Longlegs (2009)
- Sorry, Thanks (2009)
- The Exploding Girl (2009)
- Breaking Upwards (2009)
- Cyrus (2010)
- The Freebie (2010)
- Guy and Madeline on a Park Bench (2010)
- Tiny Furniture (2010)
- You Wont Miss Me (2010)
- Overlook (2010)
- Art History (2011)
- Autoerotic (2011)
- Uncle Kent (2011)
- Entrance (2011)
- Silver Bullets (2011)
- Caitlin Plays Herself (2011)
- Your Sister's Sister (2011)
- Bellflower (2011)
- Mumblecore (2011)
- The Zone (2011)
- Memory Lane (2012)
- The Do-Deca-Pentathlon (2012)
- The Color Wheel (2012)
- Frances Ha (2012)
- Nobody Walks (2012)
- Sun Don't Shine (2012)
- I Want Your Love (2012)
- Ivy League Exorcist: The Bobby Jindal Story (2012)
- Jeff, Who Lives at Home (2012)
- Save the Date (2012)
- Celeste & Jesse Forever (2012)
- Drinking Buddies (2013)
- All the Light in the Sky (2013)
- Touchy Feely (2013)
- I Love You, Apple, I Love You, Orange (2013)
- About Alex (2014)
- Swim Little Fish Swim (2014)
- Happy Christmas (2014)
- Sulemani Keeda (2014)
- The Overnight (2015)
- A Wonderful Cloud (2015)
- Midnight Delight (2016)
- Blue Jay (2016)
- Joshy (2016)
- Teenage Cocktail (2016)
- Easy (2016–2019)
- Before I Fall (2017)
- Waiting for Violette (2017)
- Room 104 (2017-2020)
- Friends, Foes & Fireworks (2018)
- Support the Girls (2018)
- Importance (of Us) (2018)
- Only One Day in Berlin (2018)
- The Christmas Ride (2020)
- Shithouse (2020)
- Yelling Fire in an Empty Theater (2023)
- The Astrid Experience (2023)
- Connection at the End of the World (Short Film, 2025)
- Trans Coming of Age Movie (2027)

=== List of mumblegore horror films ===
- The Green Elephant (1999)
- The Roost (2005)
- Murder Party (2007)
- The Signal (2007)
- Trigger Man (2007)
- Home Sick (2007)
- Pop Skull (2007)
- I Can See You (2008)
- Baghead (2008)
- The House of the Devil (2009)
- Hysterical Psycho (2009)
- Red White & Blue (2010)
- A Horrible Way to Die (2010)
- Martha Marcy May Marlene (2011)
- Silver Bullets (2011)
- Kill List (2011)
- The Innkeepers (2011)
- Entrance (2011)
- What Fun We Were Having (2011)
- You're Next (2011)
- V/H/S (2012)
- Sun Don't Shine (2012)
- Resolution (2012)
- Sightseers (2012)
- The Battery (2012)
- V/H/S/2 (2013)
- Cheap Thrills (2013)
- Coherence (2013)
- Blue Ruin (2013)
- 24 Exposures (2013)
- The Sacrament (2013)
- Proxy (2013)
- The Guest (2014)
- Honeymoon (2014)
- Creep (2014)
- Starry Eyes (2014)
- Bag Boy Lover Boy (2014)
- It Follows (2014)
- Goodnight Mommy (2014)
- Knife of Jehovah (2014)
- Late Phases (2014)
- They Look Like People (2015)
- Synchronicity (2015)
- The Invitation (2015)
- Lace Crater (2015)
- Echo Lake (2015)
- Darling (2015)
- Southbound (2015)
- Be My Cat: A Film for Anne (2015)
- We Go On (2016)
- Always Shine (2016)
- The Alchemist Cookbook (2016)
- Another Evil (2016)
- Creep 2 (2017)
- The Endless (2017)
- The Ritual (2017)
- Flesh & Blood (2018)
- Pooka! (2018)
- Body at Brighton Rock (2019)
- I Trapped the Devil (2019)
- After Midnight (2019)
- Exit 0 (2019)
- Pooka Lives! (2020)
- Nocturne (2020)
- The Night House (2020)
- Save Yourselves! (2020)
- Rent-A-Pal (2020)
- The Rental (2020)
- Broadcast Signal Intrusion (2021)
- Evil in the Woods (2022)
- Mr. Crocket (2024)
