= Kris Swanberg =

American filmmaker

- Born: Kristin Williams; 1980 or 1981 (age 45–46)
- Other names: Kris Rey
- Occupation: Filmmaker
- Spouse: Joe Swanberg (m. 2007; div. 2019)
- Children: 2

Kris Swanberg (born Kristin Williams; 1980 or 1981) is an American businesswoman, filmmaker, actress and former high school teacher living in Chicago, Illinois. She has been credited at various times as Kris Williams, Kris Swanberg and Kris Rey. Her works as a director include the short documentary Bathwater (2006), the Nerve.com documentary web series Boys and Girls and the feature films It Was Great, But I Was Ready to Come Home (2009), Empire Builder (2012), Unexpected (2015) and I Used to Go Here (2020). She has also had small roles in a number of films, including First Man (2018).

From 2007 to 2019 she was married to filmmaker Joe Swanberg. The two co-directed, co-produced and co-starred in the 2006-2009 Nerve.com web series Young American Bodies; she also had acting roles in a number of his films.

== Early life ==
Williams earned a bachelor's degree in Film Production from Southern Illinois University at Carbondale and earned a Master's in Education from DePaul University May 2010.

== Career ==
In 2005, Swanberg coordinated The Future Filmmakers Festival, which showcases work from filmmakers under the age of 21.

Swanberg's first feature film, It Was Great, But I Was Ready to Come Home, had its world premiere at the South by Southwest film festival in March 2009. Her second feature film Empire Builder premiered in 2012, starring Kate Lyn Sheil. Her third film, Unexpected, premiered at the 2015 Sundance Film Festival. It was released on July 24, 2015, by The Film Arcade. Her fourth film, I Used to Go Here, starred Gillian Jacobs and Jemaine Clement; Swanberg was credited as Kris Rey. It was released August 7, 2020. Her next film, Trash Mountain, stars Caleb Hearon and Zooey Deschanel.

Aside from writing and directing, Swanberg has had small roles in First Man and Joshy. and has had small roles in films directed by her husband including Win It All, Happy Christmas and Hannah Takes the Stairs.

=== Nice Cream ===
In the late 2000s, Swanberg was laid off from her job as a teacher with Chicago Public Schools and while searching for a new job, she recalled receiving an ice cream maker as a wedding gift. She began experimenting with new flavors and started a new artisan small-batch ice cream business called "Nice Cream", producing the dessert at Logan Square Kitchen, a shared community resource in Chicago. By 2010, demand had increased such that the ice cream was being sold in 18 local outlets, including specialty stores, farmer's markets, and two Whole Foods locations.

In July 2011, the Illinois Department of Public Health forced her to shut down operations until she either agreed to use a premade ice mix (as is used at Dairy Queen), or constructed her own manufacturing facility and purchased a commercial dairy license (intended to regulate major dairy producers such as Dean Foods). Although she submitted samples of her ice cream to labs for testing, which determined that her bacterial levels were far lower than the state's published allowable levels, the State of Illinois shut down Swanberg's company until she purchased the large commercial equipment, stating that even if she used pasteurized milk and boiled all of her products together, she would still need to process it all through a commercial pasteurizer. Other small-batch ice cream makers in Illinois stated that they were concerned about the state coming for them next, particularly because they had invested significant sums in their businesses and could not afford to close.

== Personal life ==
She married Joe Swanberg on June 30, 2007. In March 2020, it was announced that the two had divorced. She has two children.

== Filmography ==
Actress

| Year | Title | Role |
|---|---|---|
| 2005 | Kissing on the Mouth | Laura |
| 2007 | Hannah Takes the Stairs | Gaby |
| 2009 | Alexander the Last | Stagehand |
| 2010 | Audrey the Trainwreck | Realtor Lady |
| 2011 | Autoerotic | |
| 2011 | Art History | Hillary |
| 2012 | Marriage Material | Kris |
| 2013 | The Sacrament | Mother of Gene |
| 2014 | Happy Christmas | Landlord |
| 2016 | Joshy | Anita |
| 2017 | Win It All | Kris |
| 2018 | First Man | Marilyn See |

Director

- It Was Great, But I Was Ready to Come Home (2009)
- Empire Builder (2014)
- Unexpected (2015)
- I Used to Go Here (2020)
- Trash Mountain (2026)
