= Kent Osborne =

American storyboard artist (born 1969)

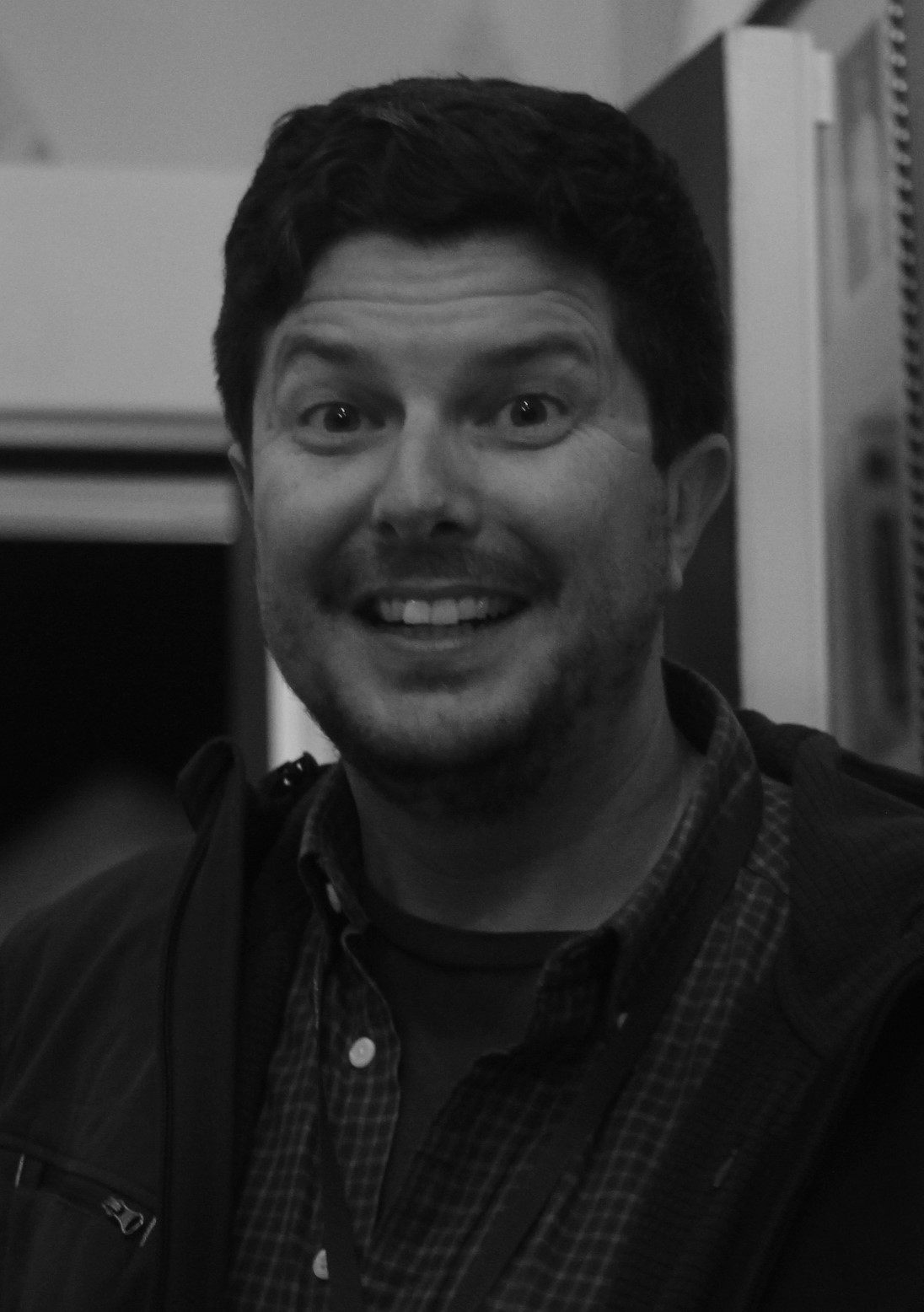
- Osborne in 2016
- Born: Kent Matthew Osborne; August 30, 1969 (age 57); New Jersey, U.S.
- Education: Hunterdon Central Regional High School
- Occupations: Animator, writer, producer, director, actor
- Years active: 1992–present
- Relatives: Mark Osborne (brother)
- Website: mrkentosborne.tumblr.com

Kent Matthew Osborne (born August 30, 1969) is an American animator, writer, producer, director, and actor. He has worked for such animated television shows as SpongeBob SquarePants, Camp Lazlo, Phineas and Ferb, The Marvelous Misadventures of Flapjack, Adventure Time, Regular Show and The Amazing World of Gumball, he has received multiple Emmy Award nominations and has won twice for Adventure Time (in 2015 and 2017). He was the head writer for the Cartoon Network animated series Summer Camp Island, which premiered in 2018, and is also co-producer and story editor for the Disney Channel animated series Kiff. He has also starred in several mumblecore films, including Hannah Takes the Stairs, Nights and Weekends, All the Light in the Sky and Uncle Kent (in the title role). His brother is the director Mark Osborne. Osborne had replaced Walt Dohrn as a storyboard director and writer after Dohrn left SpongeBob to work on more DreamWorks films in 2002.

== Early life ==
Kent Osborne and his brother Mark were raised in Vermont before moving to Flemington, New Jersey. He graduated from Hunterdon Central Regional High School and studied acting in New York at the American Academy of Dramatic Arts and David Mamet's Atlantic Theater Company.

== Career ==
Osborne's first film role was a small part in School Ties (1992) with Brendan Fraser, Matt Damon, Ben Affleck, and Chris O'Donnell. His character Emile in School Ties inspired Osborne to write the screenplay for the film Dropping Out, in which he starred alongside David Koechner, Adam Arkin, John Stamos, Katey Sagal, and Fred Willard. His brother Mark directed the film, which had its world premiere at the 2000 Sundance Film Festival.

Osborne served as writing partner for the comedian Rob Schneider. After recurring appearances on the TBS show Dinner and a Movie, he hosted a spinoff TBS program, Movie Lounge, beginning in 1998–2001.

From 2002 to 2005, Osborne was a writer and a storyboard director for SpongeBob SquarePants on Nickelodeon. He received two Emmy Award nominations for his writing on the show, in 2003 and 2004. He was also one of the writers for the theatrical film, The SpongeBob SquarePants Movie (2004). He also contributed to Behind Closed Doors.

Osborne went on to write for other animated series appearing on the Cartoon Network, including Camp Lazlo (Emmy nomination in 2006), The Marvelous Misadventures of Flapjack (Emmy nomination in 2010), and Adventure Time (Emmy nominations in 2010, 2012, 2013, 2014, and 2016, with wins in 2015 and 2017). He also wrote and storyboarded several episodes of the first season of Disney Channel's Phineas and Ferb in 2008.

Osborne has been a screenwriter and actor in a number of films associated with the mumblecore movement, including several directed by Joe Swanberg. He co-wrote and acted in Hannah Takes the Stairs (2007) and had a supporting role in Nights and Weekends (2008). For Uncle Kent, which debuted at the 2011 Sundance Film Festival, Osborne served as co-writer and co-producer, as well as playing the title role, loosely based on his own life. He returned to the semi-autobiographical role for the sequel Uncle Kent 2, which premiered at the 2015 SXSW Film Festival.

In 2011, he starred in writer/director Amber Sealey's film How to Cheat. Osborne and his castmates won the award for Best Performance in the Narrative Competition of the 2011 Los Angeles Film Festival.

In 2013, he created the internet series Cat Agent with Rug Burn (founded by staff members of Titmouse, Inc. and Six Point Harness).

Osborne also worked as a voice director for The Marvelous Misadventures of Flapjack, Bee and PuppyCat, Adventure Time and Steven Universe and a story consultant for Cartoon Network Development Studio Europe's very first show ever created The Amazing World of Gumball.

== Filmography ==
=== Film ===
Year	Title	Role	Notes
1992	School Ties	Emile	
1998	Knock Off	Pachy	
2000	Dropping Out	Emile	Writer
2004	The SpongeBob SquarePants Movie	—N/a	Writer, storyboard artist
2004	Open House	Walter	
2004	Surviving Christmas	Marley	
2007	Hannah Takes the Stairs	Matt	Writer
2007	Diggs Tailwagger		Writer
2008	Nights and Weekends	Mattie's sister's boyfriend	
2008	Kung Fu Panda	Pig Fan (voice)	
2009	Monsters vs. Aliens	Technician Jerry (voice)	
2009	Alexander the Last	Reggie	
2011	Uncle Kent	Kent	Writer, producer
2011	Art History	Eric	Writer
2011	How To Cheat	Mark	
2012	All the Light in the Sky	Dan	
2014	Wild Canaries	Calvin	
2015	Digging for Fire	Adam	
2015	Uncle Kent 2	Kent	Writer, producer
2015	Bloomin Mud Shuffle	Spandex Man	
2016	No Light and No Land Anywhere	Danny	
2017	Dismissed	Mr. David Butler	
2020	Build the Wall	Kent	
2024	Orion and the Dark		Storyboard artist

=== Television ===
Year	Title	Role	Notes
1998–01	Movie Lounge	Host	
2002–05	SpongeBob SquarePants	Writer, storyboard director, voice actor (season 3)	
2005–06	Camp Lazlo	Story, writer, storyboard artist	
2008	Phineas and Ferb	Writer, storyboard artist	
2008–10	The Marvelous Misadventures of Flapjack	Story, writer, storyboard artist, voice director, voice actor, story editor	
2010–18	Adventure Time	Story, writer, head writer, storyboard artist, supervising director (Episode: "Jake the Brick"), voice director, voice actor	
2010	Regular Show	Writer, storyboard artist (Episode: "Prank Callers")	
2011	The Amazing World of Gumball	Storyboard artist (Episode: "The Kiss"), songwriter, story consultant	
2013	Bee and PuppyCat	Voice director, voice actor (Deckard)	
2013	Cat Agent	Creator, director, writer, story writer, storyboard artist, executive producer, voice actor	
2013	Steven Universe	Voice director	
2016	Uncle Grandpa	Voice actor (Episode: "Trash Cat")	
2017	Craig of the Creek	Voice director (Pilot)	
2018–23	Summer Camp Island	Writer, story writer, storyboard artist, voice director, supervising producer, co-executive producer, voice actor	
2019	Room 104	Actor (Episode: "Hungry," Dan)	
2020	The Mighty Ones	Story (Episodes "Rocksy's in a Hole Lotta Trouble", "Creepy Caterpillar")	
2023–present	Kiff	Developer, co-producer, story editor, writer, voice actor	
