= List of awards and nominations received by Greta Gerwig =

Greta Gerwig awards and nominations
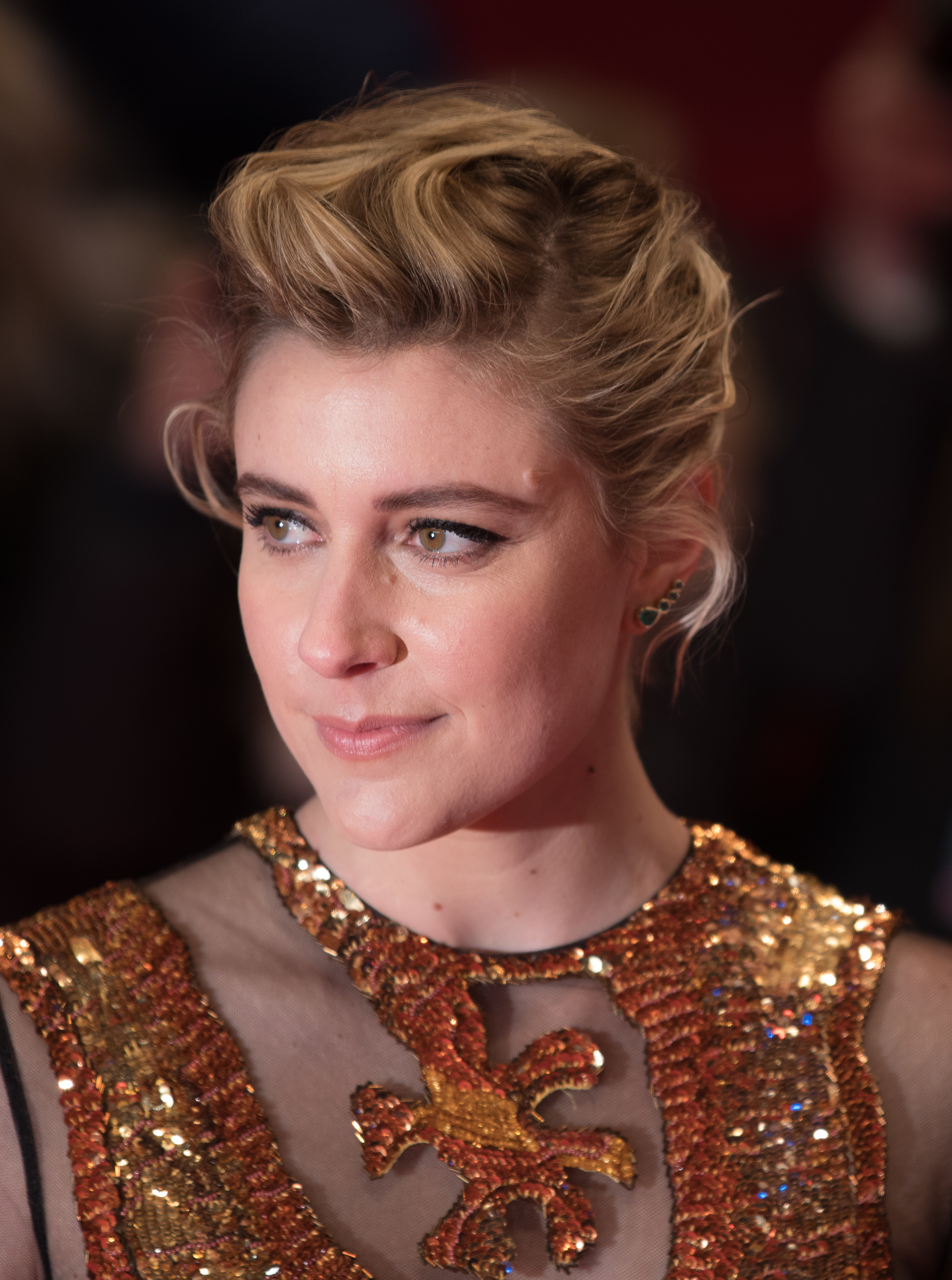
- Gerwig at the 68th Berlin International Film Festival in 2018
Awards and nominations
Award	Wins	Nominations
Academy Awards	0	4
BAFTA Awards	0	3
Critics' Choice Awards	2	8
Golden Globe Awards	1	5

Totals (Note: Certain award groups do not simply award one winner. They acknowledge several different recipients, have runners-up, and have third place. Since this is a specific recognition and is different from losing an award, runner-up mentions are considered wins in this award tally. For simplification and to avoid errors, each award in this list has been presumed to have had a prior nomination.)
- Wins: 48
- Nominations: 173

Greta Gerwig is an American actress, filmmaker, screenwriter, and producer. She has received various accolades including a Golden Globe Award, two Critics' Choice Movie Awards and an Independent Spirit Award as well as nominations for four Academy Awards, three British Academy Film Awards, two Directors Guild of America Awards, and three Writers Guild of America Awards.

Gerwig started her career as an actress before collaborating with her creative and romantic partner, director Noah Baumbach. She first acted in his film Greenberg (2010) for which she was nominated for the Gotham Independent Film Award for Breakthrough Performer and the Independent Spirit Award for Best Female Lead. She starred in his coming-of-age romance Frances Ha (2012), and served as a co–writer. As an actress in the film she was nominated for the Golden Globe Award for Best Actress in a Motion Picture – Musical or Comedy and Critics' Choice Movie Award for Best Actress in a Comedy. She then took roles in Baumbach's Mistress America (2015), which she also co–wrote and portrayed Nancy Tuckerman in the Pablo Larraín directed historical drama Jackie (2016). That same year, she played a photographer in the Mike Mills family dramedy 20th Century Women (2016) earning several award nominations including for the Critics' Choice Movie Award for Best Supporting Actress.

As a director, she made her solo freshman effort with the A24 coming-of-age comedy Lady Bird (2017), which she also wrote, earned her widespread critical acclaim and national attention. She received two Academy Award nominations for Best Director and Best Original Screenplay at the 90th Academy Awards which made her the first woman in eight years (and one of only five women in Oscar history at the time) to have been nominated in the former category. As a director she also earned a nomination for the Directors Guild of America Award for Outstanding Directing – Feature Film and as the screenwriter, she was also nominated for the BAFTA Award for Best Original Screenplay and the Golden Globe Award for Best Screenplay. She made her sophomore directorial feature with the period costume drama romance Little Women (2018), earning her nominations for the Academy Award for Best Adapted Screenplay and the BAFTA Award for Best Adapted Screenplay.

Gerwig received worldwide acclaim directing her third feature, the fantasy comedy Barbie (2023), which she co–wrote with her partner Noah Baumbach. The film became the highest grossing film ever from a female director and a cultural phenomenon. She won the Golden Globe Award for Cinematic and Box Office Achievement and the Critics' Choice Movie Award for Best Original Screenplay. She also received her fourth Academy Award nomination for Best Adapted Screenplay as well as nominations for the BAFTA Award for Best Original Screenplay, Directors Guild of America Award for Outstanding Directing – Feature Film, and Writers Guild of America Award for Best Original Screenplay.

== Major associations ==
=== Academy Awards ===
Year	Category	Nominated work	Result	Ref.
2018	Best Director	Lady Bird	Nominated	
2018	Best Original Screenplay	Lady Bird	Nominated	
2020	Best Adapted Screenplay	Little Women	Nominated	
2024	Best Adapted Screenplay	Barbie	Nominated	

=== BAFTA Awards ===
Year	Category	Nominated work	Result	Ref.
British Academy Film Awards
2018	Best Original Screenplay	Lady Bird	Nominated	
2020	Best Adapted Screenplay	Little Women	Nominated	
2024	Best Original Screenplay	Barbie	Nominated	

=== Critics' Choice Awards ===
Year	Category	Nominated work	Result	Ref.
Critics' Choice Movie Awards
2013	Best Actress in a Comedy	Frances Ha	Nominated	
2016	Best Supporting Actress	20th Century Women	Nominated	
2017	Best Director	Lady Bird	Nominated	
2017	Best Original Screenplay	Lady Bird	Nominated	
2019	Best Director	Little Women	Nominated	
2019	Best Adapted Screenplay	Little Women	Won	
2023	Best Director	Barbie	Nominated	
2023	Best Original Screenplay	Barbie	Won	

=== Golden Globe Awards ===
Year	Category	Nominated work	Result	Ref.
2014	Best Actress – Motion Picture Comedy or Musical	Frances Ha	Nominated	
2018	Best Screenplay – Motion Picture	Lady Bird	Nominated	
2024	Best Director – Motion Picture	Barbie	Nominated	
2024	Best Screenplay – Motion Picture	Barbie	Nominated	
2024	Cinematic and Box Office Achievement	Barbie	Won	

== Miscellaneous awards ==
Organizations	Year	Category	Work	Result	Ref.
AACTA International Awards	2017	Best Direction	Lady Bird	Nominated	
AACTA International Awards	2017	Best Screenplay	Lady Bird	Nominated	
AACTA International Awards	2024	Best Direction	Barbie	Nominated	
AACTA International Awards	2024	Best Screenplay	Barbie	Nominated	
Capri Hollywood International Film Festival	2024	Lina Wertmüller Award	Barbie	Won	
Capri Hollywood International Film Festival	2024	Best Original Screenplay	Barbie	Won	
Directors Guild of America Award	2018	Outstanding Directing – Feature Film	Lady Bird	Nominated	
Directors Guild of America Award	2024	Outstanding Directing – Feature Film	Barbie	Nominated	
Gotham Independent Film Awards	2017	Bingham Ray Breakthrough Director Award	Lady Bird	Nominated	
Gotham Independent Film Awards	2017	Best Screenplay	Lady Bird	Nominated	
Gotham Independent Film Awards	2023	Global Icon & Creator Tribute	Barbie	Won	
Independent Spirit Awards	2011	Best Female Lead	Greenberg	Nominated	
Independent Spirit Awards	2017	Best Screenplay	Lady Bird	Won	
National Board of Review	2017	Best Director	Lady Bird	Won	
Satellite Awards	2018	Best Director	Lady Bird	Nominated	
Satellite Awards	2018	Best Original Screenplay	Lady Bird	Nominated	
Satellite Awards	2024	Best Director	Barbie	Nominated	
Satellite Awards	2024	Best Original Screenplay	Barbie	Nominated	
Saturn Awards	2024	Best Film Direction	Barbie	Nominated	
Saturn Awards	2024	Best Film Writing	Barbie	Nominated	
Writers Guild of America Awards	2018	Best Original Screenplay	Lady Bird	Nominated	
Writers Guild of America Awards	2020	Best Adapted Screenplay	Little Women	Nominated	
Writers Guild of America Awards	2024	Best Original Screenplay	Barbie	Nominated	

== Critics awards ==
Organizations	Year	Category	Work	Result	Ref.
AARP Movies for Grownups Awards	2024	Best Picture/Best Movie for Grownups	Barbie	Nominated	
AARP Movies for Grownups Awards	2024	Best Screenwriter	Barbie	Won	
Alliance of Women Film Journalists	2007	Best Leap from Actress to Director	Nights and Weekends	Nominated	
Alliance of Women Film Journalists	2015	Best Supporting Actress	20th Century Women	Nominated	
Alliance of Women Film Journalists	2017	Best Director	Lady Bird	Nominated	
Alliance of Women Film Journalists	2017	Best Original Screenplay	Lady Bird	Nominated	
Alliance of Women Film Journalists	2017	Best Woman Director	Lady Bird	Won	
Alliance of Women Film Journalists	2017	Best Woman Screenwriter	Lady Bird	Won	
Alliance of Women Film Journalists	2017	Outstanding Achievement by a Woman in the Film Industry	Lady Bird	Nominated	
Alliance of Women Film Journalists	2018	Best Animated Female	Isle of Dogs	Nominated	
Alliance of Women Film Journalists	2019	Best Adapted Screenplay	Little Women	Won	
Alliance of Women Film Journalists	2019	Best Woman Director	Little Women	Nominated	
Alliance of Women Film Journalists	2019	Best Woman Screenwriter	Little Women	Won	
Alliance of Women Film Journalists	2024	Best Director	Barbie	Nominated	
Alliance of Women Film Journalists	2024	Best Woman Director	Barbie	Nominated	
Alliance of Women Film Journalists	2024	Best Woman Screenwriter	Barbie	Nominated	
Alliance of Women Film Journalists	2024	Best Screenplay, Original	Barbie	Won	
Astra Film and Creative Awards	2020	Best Female Director	Little Women	Nominated	
Astra Film and Creative Awards	2024	Best Director	Barbie	Nominated	
Astra Film and Creative Awards	2024	Best Original Screenplay	Barbie	Won	
Austin Film Critics Association	2017	Best Director	Lady Bird	Nominated	
Austin Film Critics Association	2017	Best Original Screenplay	Lady Bird	Nominated	
Austin Film Critics Association	2017	Breakthrough Artist Award	Lady Bird	Nominated	
Austin Film Critics Association	2019	Best Director	Little Women	Nominated	
Austin Film Critics Association	2019	Best Adapted Screenplay	Little Women	Won	
Austin Film Critics Association	2024	Best Director	Barbie	Nominated	
Austin Film Critics Association	2024	Best Original Screenplay	Barbie	Nominated	
Boston Society of Film Critics	2017	Best Screenplay	Lady Bird	Won	
Boston Society of Film Critics	2019	Best Director	Little Women	Runner-up	
Boston Society of Film Critics	2019	Best Screenplay	Little Women	Runner-up	
Chicago Film Critics Association	2017	Best Director	Lady Bird	Nominated	
Chicago Film Critics Association	2017	Best Original Screenplay	Lady Bird	Nominated	
Chicago Film Critics Association	2017	Most Promising Filmmaker	Lady Bird	Won	
Chicago Film Critics Association	2019	Best Director	Little Women	Nominated	
Chicago Film Critics Association	2019	Best Adapted Screenplay	Little Women	Won	
Chicago Film Critics Association	2023	Best Director	Barbie	Nominated	
Chicago Film Critics Association	2023	Best Original Screenplay	Barbie	Nominated	
Columbus Film Critics Association	2024	Best Director	Barbie	Nominated	
Columbus Film Critics Association	2024	Best Original Screenplay	Barbie	Nominated	
Dallas–Fort Worth Film Critics Association	2017	Best Director	Lady Bird	Nominated	
Dallas–Fort Worth Film Critics Association	2017	Best Screenplay	Lady Bird	Won	
Detroit Film Critics Society	2017	Best Director	Lady Bird	Nominated	
Detroit Film Critics Society	2017	Best Screenplay	Lady Bird	Nominated	
Dorian Awards	2017	Director of the Year	Lady Bird	Nominated	
Dorian Awards	2017	Screenplay of the Year	Lady Bird	Nominated	
Dorian Awards	2019	Director of the Year	Little Women	Nominated	
Dorian Awards	2019	Screenplay of the Year	Little Women	Nominated	
Dublin Film Critics' Circle	2017	Best Director	Lady Bird	Nominated	
Dublin Film Critics' Circle	2017	Best Screenplay	Lady Bird	Nominated	
Dublin Film Critics' Circle	2023	Best Director	Barbie	Nominated	
Florida Film Critics Circle	2017	Best Director	Lady Bird	Nominated	
Florida Film Critics Circle	2017	Best Original Screenplay	Lady Bird	Nominated	
Florida Film Critics Circle	2017	Pauline Kael Breakout Award	Lady Bird	Nominated	
Florida Film Critics Circle	2019	Best Director	Little Women	Nominated	
Florida Film Critics Circle	2019	Best Adapted Screenplay	Little Women	Won	
Georgia Film Critics Association	2017	Best Director	Lady Bird	Won	
Georgia Film Critics Association	2017	Best Original Screenplay	Lady Bird	Nominated	
Georgia Film Critics Association	2017	Breakthrough Award	Lady Bird	Nominated	
Georgia Film Critics Association	2019	Best Adapted Screenplay	Little Women	Nominated	
Georgia Film Critics Association	2023	Best Director	Barbie	Runner-up	
Georgia Film Critics Association	2023	Best Original Screenplay	Barbie	Nominated	
Houston Film Critics Society	2017	Best Director	Lady Bird	Won	
Houston Film Critics Society	2017	Best Screenplay	Lady Bird	Won	
Houston Film Critics Society	2024	Best Director	Barbie	Nominated	
Houston Film Critics Society	2024	Best Screenplay	Barbie	Nominated	
IndieWire Critics Poll	2017	Best Director	Lady Bird	3rd place	
IndieWire Critics Poll	2017	Best Screenplay	Lady Bird	2nd place	
IndieWire Critics Poll	2019	Best Director	Little Women	Nominated	
IndieWire Critics Poll	2019	Best Screenplay	Little Women	Nominated	
IndieWire Critics Poll	2023	Best Director	Barbie	Nominated	
International Cinephile Society	2017	Best Director	Lady Bird	Nominated	
International Cinephile Society	2017	Best Original Screenplay	Lady Bird	Nominated	
International Cinephile Society	2019	Best Adapted Screenplay	Little Women	2nd place	
London Film Critics' Circle	2018	Screenwriter of the Year	Lady Bird	Nominated	
London Film Critics' Circle	2024	Director of the Year	Barbie	Nominated	
London Film Critics' Circle	2024	Screenwriter of the Year	Barbie	Nominated	
Los Angeles Online Film Critics Society	2017	Best Original Screenplay	Lady Bird	Nominated	
Los Angeles Online Film Critics Society	2017	Best Female Director	Lady Bird	Won	
Los Angeles Online Film Critics Society	2017	Best First Feature	Lady Bird	Nominated	
National Society of Film Critics	2017	Best Director	Lady Bird	Won	
National Society of Film Critics	2017	Best Screenplay	Lady Bird	Won	
National Society of Film Critics	2019	Best Director	Little Women	Won	
National Society of Film Critics	2019	Best Screenplay	Little Women	3rd place	
Online Film Critics Society	2017	Best Director	Lady Bird	Nominated	
Online Film Critics Society	2017	Best Original Screenplay	Lady Bird	Nominated	
Online Film Critics Society	2019	Best Adapted Screenplay	Little Women	Nominated	
Online Film Critics Society	2024	Best Director	Barbie	Nominated	
Online Film Critics Society	2024	Best Original Screenplay	Barbie	Nominated	
San Diego Film Critics Society	2017	Best Director	Lady Bird	Won	
San Diego Film Critics Society	2017	Best Original Screenplay	Lady Bird	Nominated	
San Diego Film Critics Society	2017	Breakthrough Artist	Lady Bird	Nominated	
San Diego Film Critics Society	2019	Best Adapted Screenplay	Little Women	Nominated	
San Diego Film Critics Society	2023	Best Director	Barbie	Runner-up	
San Diego Film Critics Society	2023	Best Original Screenplay	Barbie	Won	
San Francisco Film Critics Circle	2017	Best Director	Lady Bird	Nominated	
San Francisco Film Critics Circle	2017	Best Original Screenplay	Lady Bird	Nominated	
San Francisco Film Critics Circle	2019	Best Adapted Screenplay	Little Women	Nominated	
San Francisco Film Critics Circle	2024	Best Director	Barbie	Nominated	
San Francisco Film Critics Circle	2024	Best Original Screenplay	Barbie	Nominated	
Seattle Film Critics Society	2017	Best Director	Lady Bird	Nominated	
Seattle Film Critics Society	2017	Best Screenplay	Lady Bird	Won	
Seattle Film Critics Society	2019	Best Director	Little Women	Nominated	
Seattle Film Critics Society	2024	Best Director	Barbie	Nominated	
St. Louis Film Critics Association	2017	Best Director	Lady Bird	Nominated	
St. Louis Film Critics Association	2017	Best Original Screenplay	Lady Bird	Nominated	
St. Louis Film Critics Association	2019	Best Adapted Screenplay	Little Women	Runner-up	
St. Louis Film Critics Association	2023	Best Director	Barbie	Runner-up	
St. Louis Film Critics Association	2023	Best Original Screenplay	Barbie	Won	
Toronto Film Critics Association	2017	Best Director	Lady Bird	Won	
Toronto Film Critics Association	2017	Best Screenplay	Lady Bird	Nominated	
Toronto Film Critics Association	2023	Best Original Screenplay	Barbie	Won	
Utah Film Critics Association	2024	Best Achievement in Directing	Barbie	Nominated	
Utah Film Critics Association	2024	Best Original Screenplay	Barbie	Runner-up	
Vancouver Film Critics Circle	2017	Best Director	Lady Bird	Nominated	
Vancouver Film Critics Circle	2017	Best Screenplay	Lady Bird	Nominated	
Vancouver Film Critics Circle	2024	Best Screenplay	Barbie	Won	
Washington D.C. Area Film Critics Association	2017	Best Director	Lady Bird	Nominated	
Washington D.C. Area Film Critics Association	2017	Best Original Screenplay	Lady Bird	Nominated	
Washington D.C. Area Film Critics Association	2019	Best Director	Little Women	Nominated	
Washington D.C. Area Film Critics Association	2019	Best Adapted Screenplay	Little Women	Won	
Washington D.C. Area Film Critics Association	2023	Best Director	Barbie	Nominated	
Washington D.C. Area Film Critics Association	2023	Best Original Screenplay	Barbie	Nominated	
Women Film Critics Circle	2017	Best Woman Storyteller	Lady Bird	Won	
Women Film Critics Circle	2019	Best Woman Storyteller	Little Women	Won	

== Special honors ==
Organizations	Year	Award	Result	Ref.
Athena Film Festival	2011	Hollywood's definitive screen actresses of her generation	Honored	
Berlin International Film Festival	2014	Was selected as that year's Jury member	Honored	
Cannes Film Festival	2024	Was selected as that year's Jury President (Note: In 2024, Gerwig presided over the feature film Competition Jury of the, becoming the first American female director to take on the role of Jury President at Cannes Film Festival)	Honored	
