= Friends, Foes & Fireworks =

2018 independent mumblecore film from Australia

- Directed by: Sarah Jayne; Ivan Malekin
- Cinematography: Stephen Ramplin
- Edited by: Ivan Malekin
- Music by: Gerard Mack
- Production company: Nexus Production Group
- Release date: 2018
- Running time: 75 minutes
- Country: Australia
- Language: English

Friends, Foes & Fireworks is a 2018 independent mumblecore film from Australia. It is directed by Ivan Malekin and Sarah Jayne Portelli and is noted for being improvised and filmed in a single night on New Year's Eve.

== Plot ==
The movie begins with Fiona (Lara Deam) who repeats affirmations in the mirror while holding her chest. She is hosting a New Year's Eve party for her friends and fellow actors: newly successful Lucinda (Whitney Duff); her best friend Summer (Asleen Mauthoor) who has a major crush on Lucinda; young and selfish Zoe (Jess Riley); and their acting teacher Sofia (Genya Mik).

What is meant to be a happy reunion immediately gets off to a rocky start as Lucinda brings her new British boyfriend Taron (Dan Hill) who flirts with whoever he can. Zoe performs a horrible monologue for the group, seeking Sofia's approval, but Sofia bites her criticisms on her tongue. Summer accidentally reveals Sofia is pregnant but Sofia says she will get an abortion, causing Fiona to urge her to keep the baby. On the stroke of midnight Summer kisses Lucinda, causing Lucinda to storm away as she doesn't feel the same way about Summer. Sofia tells Zoe she is a terrible actress and also tells Taron he isn't wanted here.

With the friendship group split, Sofia confesses to Fiona that the father of her baby is Fiona's ex-boyfriend. Taron seduces Zoe back at the apartment while Summer and Lucinda talk about their relationship on an isolated beach. As the sun rises on the new day, Fiona is left alone to confront her health diagnosis, calling her father to admit she has breast cancer.

== Production ==
With Friends, Foes & Fireworks Ivan Malekin and Sarah Jayne Portelli wanted to experiment with a non-conventional style of filmmaking. They were inspired by the mumblecore films of the Duplass Brothers and Joe Swanberg and wanted to work intensively with actors to create something natural and authentic so they chose to use improvisation. Both felt New Year's Eve was invariably an overblown, hyped-up letdown, so they wrote a story outline based on this and the personalities of actors they had met over the course of their careers. With events in the film taking place over the course of one night, it was instinctive to attempt to film Friends, Foes & Fireworks in a single night, on New Year's Eve, to add to the authenticity of the story.

To achieve this the directors used two cameras and employed a run and gun style of cinematography common to documentaries. This added to the “fly on the wall” feeling of the film. The actors had no dialogue to learn, but worked off detailed outlines with scene beats to hit, and extensive character backgrounds with specific relationship dynamics factored in. In the month-long rehearsal process the actors would improvise scenarios from the past of the characters to build the group history, and also discuss relationship dynamics at length. The directors also cast actors they had worked with previously, who they trusted as performers and people, as it was important for Ivan and Sarah to build a good group rapport on set. Dan Hill was a late inclusion to the cast as Taron, replacing another actor who pulled out as he was unsure if he could handle the improvisation aspect of the film. Dan was also kept separate from the rest of the cast during rehearsal, apart from his onscreen girlfriend Lucinda played by Whitney Duff, so when he arrived at the party in the opening scene of the film this was the first time most of the cast met Dan. He became a true stranger and interloper.

As the group of friends split at midnight in the storyline of Friends, Foes & Fireworks, the crew also split up to film separate characters simultaneously in different locations. Sarah Jayne Portelli and DOP Stephen Ramplin filmed one set of actors, while Ivan Malekin with a production assistant filmed another set of actors.

The shoot wrapped back at the apartment of Fiona, played by Lara Deam, at 8am on New Year's Day. Production had begun at 4pm on New Year's Eve, so after an intense 14 hour shoot, the directors had all the footage they needed to successfully make Friends, Foes & Fireworks a single-night feature, joining the likes of Victoria by Sebastian Schipper and Lost in London by Woody Harrelson as films made in 24 hours.

== Release ==
Friends, Foes & Fireworks was released on March 21, 2018, in Melbourne, Australia at the Classic Cinemas. It won several awards at the 2018 Oz International Film Festival, including Best Drama Film and Best New Talent for Lara Deam and Best Supporting Actress for Jess Riley. On May 1, 2018, Friends, Foes & Fireworks was released on Amazon Prime. while in November of the same year it was released on DVD throughout North America.

== Reception ==
Reviews for Friends, Foes & Fireworks were generally positive. Lorry Kikta from Film Threat gave the film 6.5 stars out of 10 and described Friends, Foes & Fireworks as "a great movie to watch while eating ice cream and decompressing from a stupid day at work."

Melissa Leach from FilmSnobReviews gave it a B and said "this film is one which will definitely spark emotions and leave you questioning your own perspective on certain topics which are globally controversial".

While Chris Olson from UK Film Review gave it three stars and said "I would strongly urge viewers to seek this film out for several reasons. The use of improvisation is daring and mostly well executed, which for a feature length is commendable, and the thematic strengths of the story and characters offer plenty to chew on".
