= The Becomers =

2023 film by Zach Clark

- Directed by: Zach Clark
- Written by: Zach Clark
- Produced by: Joe Swanberg; Erich Ashworth; Eddie Linker
- Starring: Molly Plunk; Mike Lopez; Russell Mael
- Cinematography: Daryl Pittman
- Edited by: Zach Clark
- Music by: Fritz Myers
- Distributed by: Dark Star Pictures
- Release dates: July 22, 2023 (Fantasia International Film Festival); September 24, 2024 (VOD)
- Running time: 86 minutes
- Country: United States
- Language: English
- Budget: >$100,000

The Becomers is a 2023 American film by Zach Clark.

== Plot ==
Two alien lovers flee their dying planet and seize the bodies of two humans. They jump from body to body while attempting to find each other and live in the United States.

== Cast ==
- Molly Plunk
- Mike Lopez
- Frank V. Ross
- Isabel Alamin
- Keith Kelly
- Russell Mael (narrator)

== Production ==
In February 2021, Joe Swanberg asked Zach Clark if he "had any ideas for $100,000 genre movies that we could shoot in 12 days in Chicago" as Swanberg was trying to produce four to six films. Clark wrote The Becomers in March 2021, and was inspired by B movies from the 1950s. Clark met and cast Russell Mael of the band Sparks as the film's narrator, after the latter was a guest on a Zoom meeting hosted by one of Clark's friends.

Clark directed and edited the film. It was shot in and around Chicago on a budget greater than $100,000. The cinematography was performed by Daryl Pittman and the soundtrack was composed by Fritz Myers.

== Release ==
The Becomers was shown at the Fantasia International Film Festival on July 22, 2023. Dark Star Pictures distributed the film and it theatrically premiered at Cinema Village on August 23, 2024. It will be released to video on demand on September 24.

== Reception ==
On the review aggregator website Rotten Tomatoes, 92% of 25 critics' reviews are positive, with an average rating of 7/10. Metacritic, which uses a weighted average, assigned the film a score of 59 out of 100, based on 6 critics, indicating "mixed or average" reviews.

Matt Zoller Seitz, writing in RogerEbert.com, gave the film three stars as it is "an arresting movie, and a great example of how to do a lot with a little", but wrote that he was "not sure that Clark has enough gas in the tank to carry the movie’s premise through". Alison Foreman, writing in IndieWire, gave the film a B−, but wrote that it "loses its way when Clark starts searching for a political message he can’t pin down". Jason Adams, writing in Mashable, praised the film as a "sweet and tender romance under a good dollop of gross-out Cronenbergian body horror".
