= The Sun Never Sets (2026 film) =

2026 American drama film

- Theatrical release poster
- Directed by: Joe Swanberg
- Written by: Joe Swanberg
- Produced by: Joe Swanberg; Dakota Fanning; Jake Johnson; Cory Michael Smith; Ashleigh Snead
- Starring: Dakota Fanning; Jake Johnson; Cory Michael Smith; Debby Ryan; Anna Konkle; Lamorne Morris; Karley Sciortino
- Cinematography: Eon Mora
- Edited by: Joe Swanberg
- Production company: The Alaska Project
- Distributed by: Independent Film Company; Sapan Studio
- Release dates: March 13, 2026 (SXSW); August 28, 2026 (United States)
- Running time: 104 minutes
- Country: United States
- Language: English
- Box office: $282,578

The Sun Never Sets is a 2026 American drama film written, directed, produced, and edited by Joe Swanberg. It stars Dakota Fanning, Jake Johnson, Cory Michael Smith, Debby Ryan, Anna Konkle, Lamorne Morris and Karley Sciortino.

It had its world premiere at South by Southwest on March 13, 2026, and was released in limited theaters in the United States on August 28, 2026, before going for a wide release on September 4.

== Premise ==
Wendy's life becomes chaos when her boyfriend Jack insists they take some time apart. During the break, she unexpectedly runs into her ex, Chuck.

== Cast ==
- Dakota Fanning as Wendy
- Jake Johnson as Jack
- Cory Michael Smith as Chuck
- Debby Ryan as Lindsay
- Anna Konkle as Elizabeth
- Lamorne Morris as Jack’s friend
- Karley Sciortino as Sara
- Joe Swanberg as Keith

== Production ==
In August 2025, Dakota Fanning, Jake Johnson and Cory Michael Smith joined the cast of the film, with Joe Swanberg directing and producing alongside Fanning, Johnson, and Michael Smith. Principal photography concluded in Alaska.

== Release ==
It had its world premiere at South by Southwest on March 13, 2026. In May 2026, Independent Film Company and Sapan Studio acquired U.S. distribution rights, for a 2026 release. The film was released in limited theaters in the United States on August 28, 2026, before going for a wide release on September 4. In October 2026, Focus Features acquired rights to the film for the world excluding North and Latin America, Eastern Europe, Italy, Scandinavia, Portugal, the Middle East, Turkey, and international airlines, with parent company Universal Pictures handling distribution on its behalf.

== Reception ==
On the review aggregation website Rotten Tomatoes, 80% of 59 critics' reviews are positive, with an average rating of 7.2/10. The site's critical consensus reads, "The Sun Never Sets turns the familiar rhythms of a love triangle into a perceptive portrait of romantic indecision, buoyed by director Joe Swanberg's loose approach and Dakota Fanning's compelling performance." Metacritic, which uses a weighted average, assigned the film a score of 66 out of 100, based on 18 critics, indicating "generally favorable" reviews.
