= Invader (2024 film) =

2024 film directed by Mickey Keating

- Film poster
- Directed by: Mickey Keating
- Written by: Mickey Keating
- Produced by: Eric Ashworth; Amanda Brinton; Edwin Linker; Joe Swanberg
- Starring: Vero Maynez; Colin Huerta
- Release date: August 25, 2024
- Running time: 70 minutes
- Country: United States
- Languages: Spanish; English

Invader is a 2024 American horror-thriller film written and directed by Mickey Keating, starring Vero Maynez and Colin Huerta. Its plot focusses on a woman named Ana who arrives at a bus station to visit her cousin Camila, only to discover something sinister.

== Cast ==
- Vero Maynez as Ana
- Colin Huerta as Carlo
- Ruby Vallejo as Camila
- Sanjay Choudrey as Grocery Store Manager
- Joe Swanberg as Invader

== Release ==
Invader was released in the United Kingdom on August 25, 2024 at FrightFest. It was given a limited release in Canada and the United States on February 21, 2025.

== Reception ==
On the review aggregator website Rotten Tomatoes, 58% of 12 critics' reviews are positive. Metacritic, which uses a weighted average, assigned the film a score of 52 out of 100, based on 4 critics, indicating "mixed or average" reviews.

Richard Roeper of the Chicago Sun-Times gave the film 3 stars out of 4, commenting that "Keating knows how to deliver the goods in lean fashion." Christy Lemire of RogerEbert.com gave the film 1.5 stars out of 4, calling it "thoroughly unpleasant", criticizing a lack of emotional connection to the protagonist, and saying that "if you're not in the headspace for shrieky, shaky-cam torture, this may not be for you."
