= Autoerotic (2011 film) =

2011 film by Joe Swanberg

- Film poster
- Directed by: Joe Swanberg; Adam Wingard
- Written by: Joe Swanberg; Adam Wingard; Simon Barrett
- Produced by: Joe Swanberg
- Starring: Kate Lyn Sheil; Amy Seimetz; Lane Hughes; Kris Swanberg; Ti West; Frank V. Ross
- Cinematography: Adam Wingard; Chris Hilleke
- Edited by: Adam Wingard
- Music by: Lane Hughes
- Production company: Swanberry
- Distributed by: IFC Midnight
- Release date: July 22, 2011
- Running time: 73 minutes
- Country: United States
- Language: English

Autoerotic is a 2011 comedy-drama film directed by Joe Swanberg and Adam Wingard, written by Swanberg, Wingard, and Simon Barrett, and starring Kate Lyn Sheil, Amy Seimetz, Lane Hughes, Kris Swanberg, Ti West, and Frank V. Ross. IFC Midnight released it to video on demand on July 22, 2011.

== Premise ==
Four couples in Chicago attempt to deal with their relationship troubles by resorting to masturbation, frequently.

== Cast ==
- Amy Seimetz
- Kate Lyn Sheil
- Joe Swanberg
- Lane Hughes
- Frank V. Ross
- Kris Swanberg
- Josephine Decker
- Rosemary Plain
- Adam Wingard
- Megan Mercier
- Ti West
- Brendan Kelly

The characters are all unnamed.

== Release ==
IFC Midnight released the film on July 22, 2011.

== Reception ==
Rotten Tomatoes, a review aggregator, reports that 30% of 10 surveyed critics gave the film a positive review; the average rating was 4.71/10. Metacritic rated it 48/100 based on five reviews. Peter Debruge of Variety called it "vaguely titillating" but of questionable interest to audiences. A. O. Scott of The New York Times likened it to R-rated O. Henry stories and said it is more disciplined than Swanberg's previous films. Mark Holcomb of The Village Voice wrote that it "is only sporadically a good sex comedy". Diego Costa of Slant Magazine rated it 2/4 stars and wrote that mumblecore filmmakers' search for authenticity has led their films to become artificial. Jason Bailey of DVD Talk rated it 2/5 stars and called it "little more than a series of sniggering, mediocre dirty jokes".
