= Win It All =

- Directed by: Joe Swanberg
- Written by: Joe Swanberg; Jake Johnson
- Produced by: Joe Swanberg; Jake Johnson; Alex Orr
- Starring: Jake Johnson; Aislinn Derbez; Joe Lo Truglio; Keegan-Michael Key; Nicky Excitement
- Cinematography: Eon Mora
- Edited by: Joe Swanberg
- Music by: Dan Romer
- Production companies: Forager Films; Garrett Doubles Down
- Distributed by: Netflix
- Release dates: March 11, 2017 (South by Southwest); April 7, 2017 (United States)
- Running time: 90 minutes
- Country: United States
- Language: English

Win It All is a 2017 American comedy film co-written, directed and edited by Joe Swanberg. Jake Johnson, who co-wrote the screenplay, stars alongside Aislinn Derbez, Joe Lo Truglio and Keegan-Michael Key.

The film had its world premiere at South by Southwest on March 11, 2017. It was released on April 7, 2017, by Netflix.

== Plot ==
Eddie Garrett is a gambling addict working as a parking attendant outside Wrigley Field. One morning Eddie finds Michael, a local thug, sitting in his kitchen. Michael asks Eddie to store a mysterious duffel bag, without opening it or asking questions, while he is in prison for six months, promising to pay Eddie $10,000. Eddie agrees, but a few days later gives in to temptation and opens the bag, finding several odd objects and a large sum of cash.

Although advised by his addiction recovery sponsor Gene not to touch the money, Eddie eventually takes $500 from the bag and gambles it. He wins money, returns the $500 to the bag, and invites his friends to celebrate at the local bar. While there, Eddie meets Eva, a local nurse. They hit it off and Eddie makes plans to see her again.

Feeling good, Eddie again gambles and loses all his profit. He begins a downward spiral of gambling that ends with him owing the bag over twenty-one thousand dollars. Desperate, he calls Gene for help and confesses his gambling. At first he mocks him, but finally decides to help.

Eddie begins attending addiction counseling regularly and approaches his brother Ron for a job. Ron agrees to give him a job for six months, and if Eddie works hard and meets his obligations then Ron will loan him the money to pay the bag back. He shows up to work on time the next day and begins sorting his life out. He regularly pays the bag back and grows closer to Eva, even introducing her to his family.

After six weeks of hard work Eddie gets an unexpected phone call from Michael in prison. He's being released early and will be over to retrieve his bag in a week. Panicked, Eddie approaches Ron and begs him for the money to repay the bag but Ron refuses, believing he wants to gamble. Eddie gets drunk and loses even more money from the bag before the casino bans him. Bottoming out, he goes to Gene's in the middle of the night for help. He convinces Eddie to come to the meeting the next day.

After the meeting, Gene and Eddie stop at a diner. Eddie begs him to help and he finally relents. Seeing no other way out, Gene agrees to get Eddie into a high stakes poker game with the condition that if Eddie goes broke he will leave town. Eddie and a friend drive to the game with the bag and Eddie buys in for $15,000. After losing double that, Eddie takes a break and panics, deciding that he has to run. He calms down and decides to put the rest of the money in the game at once.

After playing awhile he wins a huge pot and is back up with a profit. He wants to continue playing but his friend insists he cash out. Beginning to argue, he then clutches his chest and collapses. He is cashed out and driven to the hospital where he wakes the next day, late for dinner with Eva's family. He talks Ron into driving him to Eva's, and the movie ends with Eddie happily eating dinner with Eva and her family. Meanwhile, Michael is confused as to why he has $400 more than he started with.

== Cast ==
- Jake Johnson as Eddie Garrett, a recovering gambling addict.
- Aislinn Derbez as Eva, Eddie's love interest
- Joe Lo Truglio as Ron Garrett, Eddie's older brother who runs a company and hires Eddie. Although supportive of his younger brother he is nonetheless exasperated over his antics and immaturity.
- Keegan-Michael Key as Gene, Eddie's recovery sponsor
- Nicky Excitement as Nick
- Jose A. Garcia as Michael, a local thug who is going to serve a prison sentence and who entrusts Eddie with the bag
- Kris Swanberg as Kris

== Production ==
In August 2015, it was announced Joe Swanberg would direct the film, from a screenplay written by him and Jake Johnson. It was later revealed Aislinn Derbez, Joe Lo Truglio and Keegan-Michael Key had been cast in the film, and secretly shot in Chicago.

== Release ==
The film had its world premiere at South by Southwest on March 11, 2017. It was released on April 7, 2017, by Netflix.

=== Critical reception ===
Win It All has received positive reviews from film critics. It holds an 85% approval rating on review aggregator website Rotten Tomatoes based on 39 critics, with an average rating of 6.8/10. The website's critics consensus reads: "Win It All finds writer-director Joe Swanberg working in a comparatively mainstream vein -- and striking another collaborative spark with leading man Jake Johnson." It also has a weighted average score of 77/100 on Metacritic based on 14 reviews, stating "generally favorable reviews".
