= Greta Gerwig =

American actress and filmmaker (born 1983)

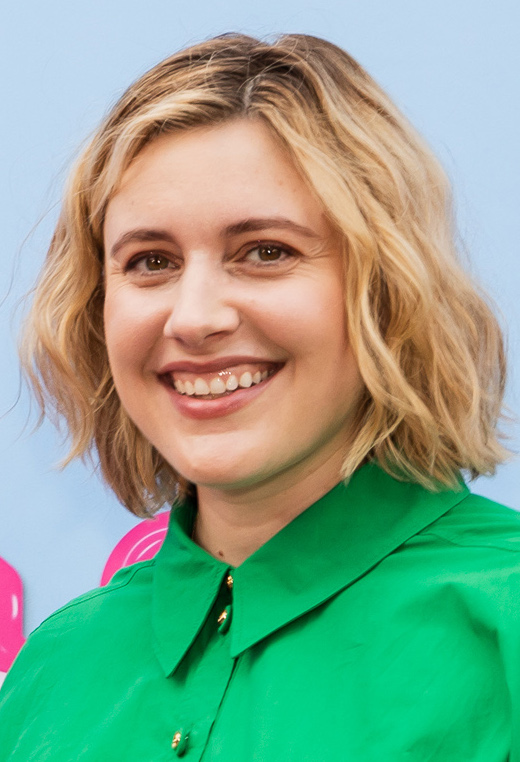
- Gerwig in 2023
- Born: Greta Celeste Gerwig; August 4, 1983 (age 43); Sacramento, California, U.S.
- Education: Barnard College (BA)
- Occupations: Actress; screenwriter; director
- Years active: 2006–present
- Spouse: Noah Baumbach (m. 2023)
- Children: 2
- Awards: Full list

Greta Celeste Gerwig (/ˈɡɜːrwɪɡ/ GUR-wig; born August 4, 1983) is an American actress and filmmaker. She was initially known for working on various mumblecore films, such as Baghead (2008) and Yeast (2008), in which she became an important figure in the movement. Since then she has expanded from acting in and co-writing independent films to directing major studio films. Gerwig was included in the annual Time 100 list of the most influential people in the world in 2018.

Gerwig began her career working with Joe Swanberg on films such as Hannah Takes the Stairs (2007) and Nights and Weekends (2008). She has collaborated with her husband Noah Baumbach on several films, including Greenberg (2010) and Frances Ha (2012), for which she received a Golden Globe Award nomination, Mistress America (2015), and White Noise (2022). She also acted in such films as Whit Stillman's Damsels in Distress (2011), Woody Allen's To Rome with Love (2012), Rebecca Miller's Maggie's Plan (2015), Pablo Larraín's Jackie (2016), Mike Mills's 20th Century Women (2016), and Wes Anderson's Isle of Dogs (2018).

As a solo filmmaker, Gerwig has written and directed coming-of-age films Lady Bird (2017) and Little Women (2019), and the fantasy-comedy Barbie (2023), all of which earned nominations for the Academy Award for Best Picture. For Lady Bird, she received Academy Award nominations for Best Director and Best Original Screenplay, and for Little Women, she was nominated for Best Adapted Screenplay. Both of these films explored themes of girlhood, artistic ambition, and mother-daughter relationships. Barbie, which she co-wrote with Baumbach, became the only film from a solo female director to gross over a billion dollars worldwide, and earned her a second Academy Award nomination for Best Adapted Screenplay.

== Early life and education ==
Gerwig was born in Sacramento, California, and grew up in the River Park neighborhood. She is the daughter of Christine, an OB-GYN nurse, and Gordon Gerwig, who worked for a credit union on small business loans. She is close to her parents and they make an appearance in Frances Ha as her character's parents. She has an older brother, a landscape architect, and a sister, a manager at the Equal Employment Opportunity Commission. Gerwig has German ancestry.

Gerwig was raised a Unitarian Universalist and attended Protestant churches. She attended St. Francis High School, an all-girls Catholic school in Sacramento, and graduated in 2002. She has described herself as having been "an intense child." Gerwig showed an early interest in dance and later took up competitive fencing but had to quit, in part due to the high costs. She had intended to study musical theatre at either NYU or UCLA; however, she ended up graduating from Barnard College with a degree in English and philosophy. Outside of class, she performed in the Columbia University Varsity Show with her dorm-mate Kate McKinnon, who starred in Gerwig's Barbie (2023).

== Career ==
=== 2006–2009: Early work ===
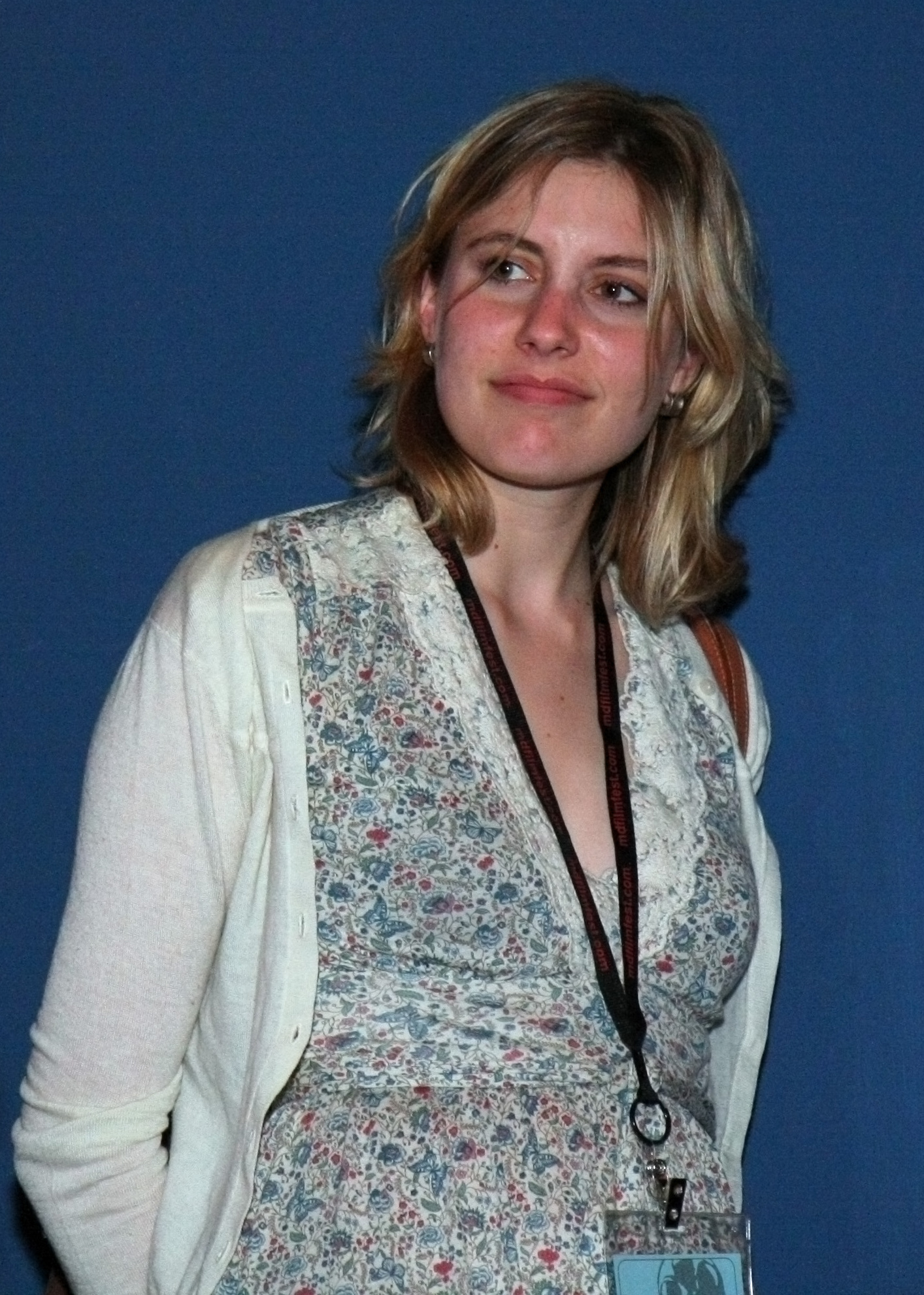
Gerwig in 2008

Gerwig originally intended to become a playwright, but she turned to acting when she was not admitted to playwriting MFA programs. In 2006, while still studying at Barnard, she was cast in a minor role in Joe Swanberg's LOL, and appeared in Baghead by Jay and Mark Duplass. She began a partnership with Swanberg, which resulted in the duo co-writing Hannah Takes the Stairs (2007), and sharing both writing and directing duties on Nights and Weekends (2008). Through these films, she became known as a key figure in the rising mumblecore film movement and was often referred to as an "it girl". Despite her consistent association with the movement, Gerwig dislikes the term "mumblecore", and has defended the style by saying, "People had gotten used to a version of a movie at a film festival that was like a calling-card for the real movie you were going to make later. What was different about these movies was these filmmakers were like, 'There is not another movie. This is the real movie.'"

Although she had an association with a number of other mumblecore filmmakers and appeared in several films, mainstream success remained elusive. Of this period in her life, Gerwig has said, "I was really depressed. I was 25 [in 2008] and thinking, 'This is supposed to be the best time and I'm miserable' but it felt like acting was happening for me, and I went back to acting classes." In order to support herself financially, she worked as a nanny and a tutor for the SAT, while continuing to audition and develop collaborative film projects. She went on to appear in other independent films of the late 2000s, such as Yeast (2008) and The House of the Devil (2009).

=== 2010–2016: Independent films ===
In 2010, Gerwig starred in Noah Baumbach's Greenberg with Ben Stiller, Rhys Ifans, and Jennifer Jason Leigh. In an appraisal of her work in this and other films, The New York Times critic A. O. Scott described Gerwig as an "ambassador of a cinematic style that often seems opposed to the very idea of style." "She seems to be embarked on a project," Scott wrote, "however piecemeal and modestly scaled, of redefining just what it is we talk about when we talk about acting." In 2010, Gerwig made her first talk show appearance on Jimmy Kimmel Live! From 2011 to 2015, she voiced Pony, one of the main characters in the Adult Swim animated series China, IL. In 2011, she was cast as a lead in an HBO pilot adaptation of The Corrections, which however was not picked up to series. Also that year she starred in Whit Stillman's comedy Damsels in Distress (2011) which premiered at the Venice International Film Festival. Critic Roger Ebert compared the film favorably to the novels of P.G. Wodehouse and praised Gerwig's performance, writing "He's also lucky to have found an actress in Gerwig who finds the perfect note for playing a woman who knows everything better than you do, but doesn't believe she's being stuck up about it; she's just being kind." In 2012, Gerwig appeared in Woody Allen's film To Rome with Love in the vignette John's Story, acting alongside Jesse Eisenberg and Alec Baldwin. Where she gained recognition for her quirky characters in both mainstream and independent films.

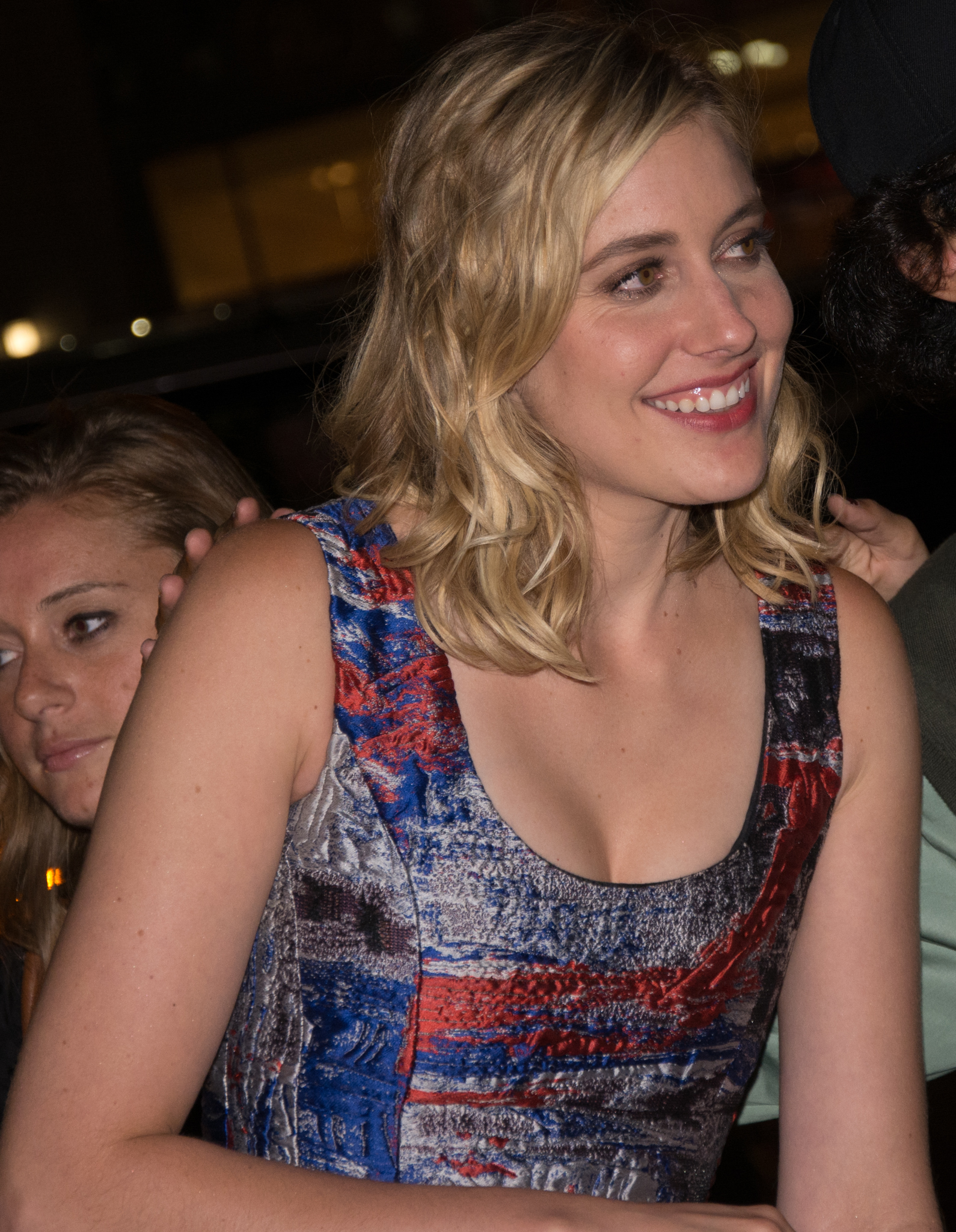
Gerwig at the 2014 Toronto International Film Festival

Gerwig and Baumbach co-wrote Baumbach's next film, Frances Ha, which was released in May 2013 after having toured the festival circuit since September 2012. Gerwig played the title role, and received a nomination for the Golden Globe Award for Best Actress – Motion Picture Comedy or Musical for her performance. Richard Brody of The New Yorker wrote "Gerwig may be famed for acting like a nonactor, but she's an extraordinarily accomplished actor (as she proved in Damsels in Distress), and here she puts the movie on her back and carries it from beginning to end, combining the spontaneous inspiration and personal presence of her earlier films". Her third collaboration with Baumbach, Mistress America, was released in August 2015 to generally positive reviews.

In February 2014, Gerwig served as a jury member at the 64th Berlin International Film Festival. In May 2014, Gerwig made her stage debut as Becky in Penelope Skinner's The Village Bike at the Lucille Lortel Theatre in New York. The production earned mixed reviews but her performance was praised by many including Ben Brantley of The New York Times who wrote, "Ms. Gerwig uses the off-balance, open-faced presence she brought to films like Frances Ha and Greenberg to hook us from the moment we set eyes on her." He added, "Gerwig turns out to be the perfect person to ride right over the edge of a cliff with". The show ran until the end of June. She was nominated for the Outer Critics Circle Award for Best Actress for her performance. She was cast in the lead role in a spin-off of How I Met Your Mother titled How I Met Your Dad in 2014, but it was not picked up to series.

Gerwig's next starring role was in Rebecca Miller's Maggie's Plan, which premiered as an official selection of the 2015 Toronto International Film Festival, opening to positive reviews. The film was also screened at the 2016 Sundance Film Festival and the 66th Berlin International Film Festival. Peter Bradshaw compared Gerwig's performance to that of Annie Hall and described the movie as being, "a witty [and] sharp comedy". That same year, Gerwig played supporting roles as White House Social Secretary Nancy Tuckerman in Pablo Larraín's drama film Jackie, and Abigail Porter in Mike Mills' coming-of-age comedy 20th Century Women, earning acclaim for both performances, particularly her work in the latter, for which she earned a nomination for the Critics' Choice Movie Award for Best Supporting Actress. Also in 2016, she guest-starred in two episodes of the comedy series The Mindy Project.

=== 2017–2019: Directorial focus ===
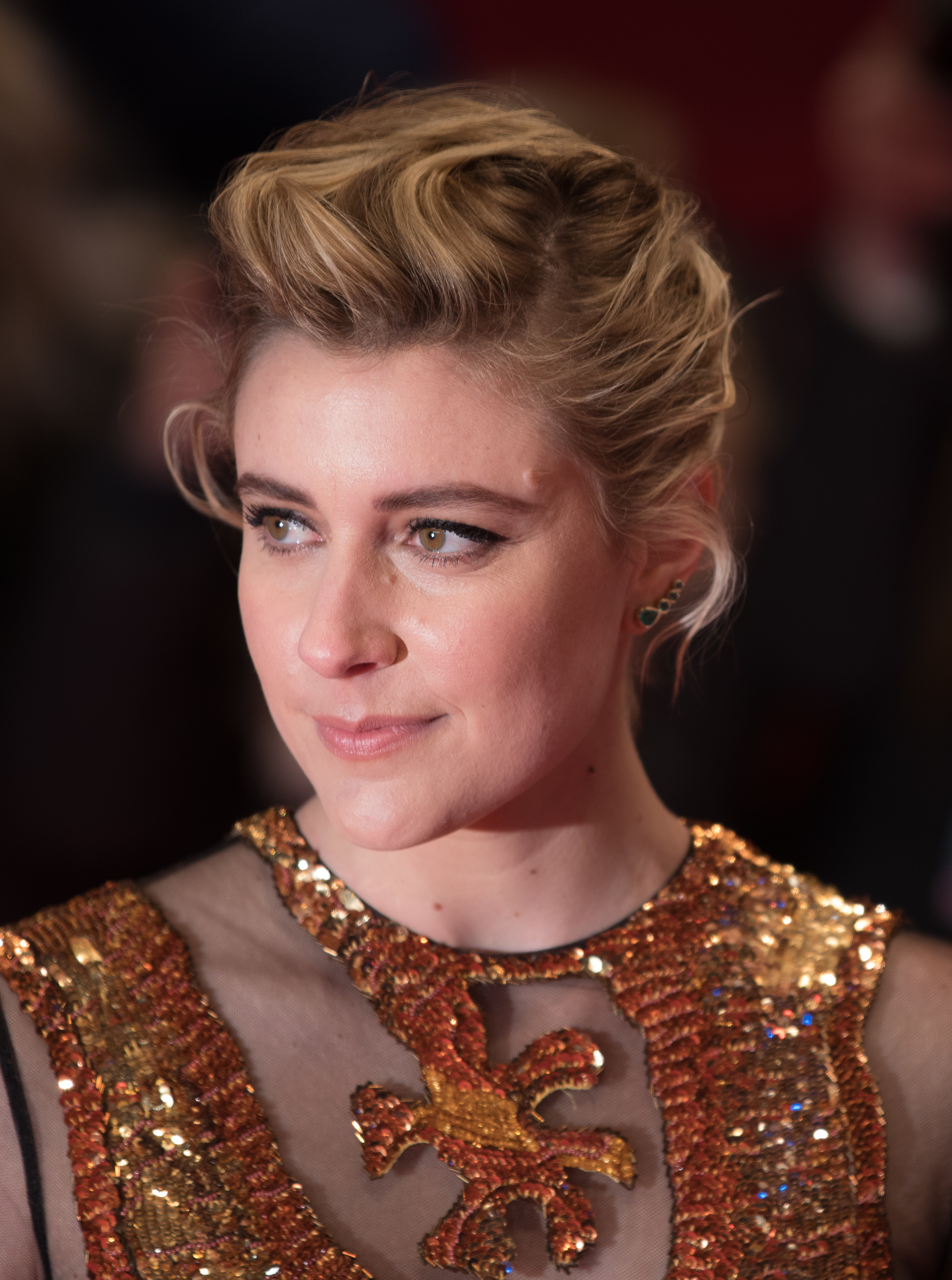
Gerwig at the 2018 Berlin International Film Festival

In 2017, Gerwig made her solo directorial debut (after having co-directed Nights and Weekends) with the coming-of-age comedy-drama film Lady Bird, which she also wrote. It starred Saoirse Ronan in the title role. Lady Bird premiered at the Telluride Film Festival and was theatrically released in November 2017. The film grossed over $78 million against its $10 million budget worldwide. Lady Bird received critical acclaim, with reviewers particularly lauding Gerwig's screenplay and direction. The film was chosen by the National Board of Review, the American Film Institute, and Time magazine as one of the top ten films of 2017. According to the review-aggregation website Rotten Tomatoes, it was given 196 positive reviews in a row, making it the record-holder for the most "fresh" reviews, until the first "rotten" one arrived in December 2017. As of 2019, it had a 99% rating on the aforementioned website.

At the 75th Golden Globe Awards, Lady Bird won Best Motion Picture – Musical or Comedy and Best Actress – Musical or Comedy for Saoirse Ronan, and also received nominations for Best Supporting Actress for Laurie Metcalf and Best Screenplay for Gerwig. At the 90th Academy Awards, it was nominated for Best Picture, Best Director and Best Original Screenplay for Gerwig, Best Actress for Ronan, and Best Supporting Actress for Metcalf. With the nominations announced, Gerwig became the fifth woman in Oscar history to be nominated for Best Director. When she found out about the nominations, Gerwig said she was "in various states of laughing and crying and yelling with joy."

In 2018, following the success of Lady Bird, Gerwig was part of the voice cast of Wes Anderson's stop-motion animated film Isle of Dogs, which premiered at the 68th Berlin International Film Festival to critical acclaim, and was nominated for the Academy Award for Best Animated Feature. In June 2018, it was announced that Gerwig would direct a new film adaptation of Louisa May Alcott's novel Little Women, whose script she had been previously hired to write. With an ensemble cast led by Ronan, Little Women was released in December 2019 to widespread critical acclaim. At the 92nd Academy Awards, it received six nominations, including Best Picture, Best Actress for Ronan, Best Supporting Actress for Pugh, Best Adapted Screenplay for Gerwig, Best Original Score, and a win for Best Costume Design. The film was frequently mentioned as part of an Oscars controversy after no woman (including Gerwig) was nominated for Best Director, a snub that was publicly noted by Hillary Clinton and Saturday Night Live, amongst others. Gerwig's name was one of those featured on the outfit that actress Natalie Portman wore to the ceremony, which featured the surnames of snubbed female directors from that year's ceremony.

=== 2020–present: Barbie and new projects ===
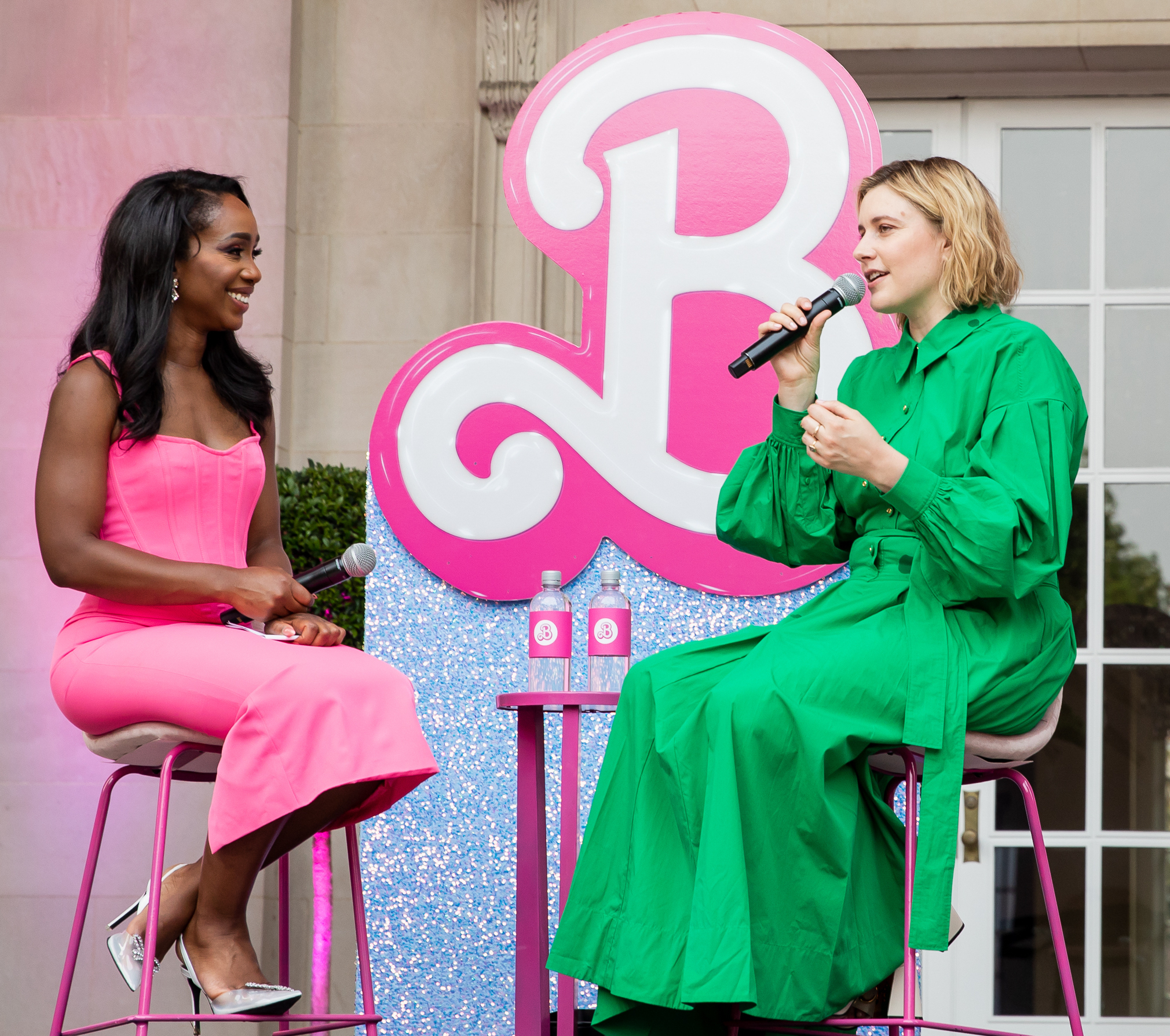
Journalist Abby Phillip with Gerwig during a Q&A for Barbie in 2023

Gerwig co-starred with Adam Driver in Baumbach's 2022 film White Noise, adapted from the novel of the same name by Don DeLillo for Netflix. The movie opened both the 79th Venice International Film Festival and the 60th New York Film Festival and was made available on the streaming platform in late 2022. Gerwig also directed and co-wrote with Baumbach the fantasy comedy Barbie for Warner Bros. Pictures, based on the Barbie fashion dolls by Mattel. It finished filming in 2022 and opened theatrically on July 21, 2023. The movie features Margot Robbie in the title role alongside Ryan Gosling (as the doll Ken). The film was a commercial success, and eventually crossed the $1 billion gross mark worldwide, making Gerwig the first woman with sole director credit to have a movie make more than $1 billion at the global box office. It received critical acclaim and other accolades, including eight Academy Award nominations, among them Gerwig and Baumbach for Best Adapted Screenplay. This marked a big change in Gerwig's career, moving from small-scale, character-driven movies to huge studio blockbusters.

Gerwig worked on the screenplay for Disney's live-action film Snow White but was uncredited. She describes her role as "I was hired for a couple of weeks. I did a 'pass' — I wrote some jokes." The New Yorker reported in July 2023 that she had been hired by Netflix to write and direct two film adaptations of C. S. Lewis' The Chronicles of Narnia book series. Gerwig's talent agent, Jeremy Barber, said that she was "looking to move beyond the small-scale dramas she was known for," and that her ambition was to be a "big studio director." In October 2024, Puck's Matthew Belloni reported that Gerwig had raised concerns to Netflix chairman Dan Lin about giving the first film, Narnia: The Magician's Nephew, a theatrical release in addition to being on the streamer. In January 2025, Belloni reported that the adaptation would receive an exclusive IMAX release in November 2026, before being released on Netflix on Christmas.

In 2024, Gerwig presided over the feature film jury for the Official Competition of the 2024 Cannes Film Festival, becoming the first American female director to take on the role of Jury President at Cannes Film Festival.

== Directorial style ==
Many of Gerwig's movies, including Lady Bird and Little Women, heavily reference her personal experiences, especially her relationships and upbringing. In a behind-the-scenes video on the set of Lady Bird she said, "I tend to start with things from my own life, then pretty quickly they spin out into their own orbit." Gerwig encourages actors to bring aspects of their own personalities into their performances as well, and says of her writing and directing, "it's all about actors." But still, allowing little line improvisation and adhering closely to the script.

Gerwig stated that she wrote Lady Bird as a "love letter" to her hometown of Sacramento, drawing on her own childhood and sense of home she only understood after she left, showing how important connection to place and memory is to her filmmaking. She worked closely with her cinematographer Sam Levy to compose each shot, steering clear of handheld or documentary-style camerawork, and employing a pastel color scheme influenced by Northern California in order to create a visual style that feels like "a memory".

In an interview with Maclean's, Gerwig cited Woody Allen as a major influence in her work stating, "His influence is hard to measure because it runs so deep". Her other influences include Howard Hawks, Ernst Lubitsch, Carole Lombard, Joan Didion, Patti Smith, Federico Fellini, Chantal Akerman, Claire Denis, Mia Hansen-Løve, John Huston, Mike Leigh and Agnès Varda.

== Personal life ==
Gerwig lives in Manhattan with her husband and writing partner, filmmaker Noah Baumbach, whom she married in 2023 after 12 years together. They have two sons together, born in March 2019 and February 2023. Gerwig is also stepmother to Baumbach's son, Rohmer Emmanuel, from his previous marriage to actress Jennifer Jason Leigh.

Gerwig has been diagnosed with attention deficit hyperactivity disorder.

== Acting credits ==
=== Film ===
| Year | Title | Role | Notes |
|---|---|---|---|
| 2006 | LOL | Greta | |
| 2007 | Hannah Takes the Stairs | Hannah | |
| 2008 | Baghead | Michelle | |
| 2008 | Yeast | Gen | |
| 2008 | Nights and Weekends | Mattie | |
| 2008 | Quick Feet, Soft Hands | Lisa | Short film |
| 2008 | I Thought You Finally Completely Lost It | Greta | |
| 2009 | You Wont Miss Me | Bridget | |
| 2009 | The House of the Devil | Megan | |
| 2010 | Greenberg | Florence Marr | |
| 2010 | Art House | Nora Ohr | |
| 2010 | Northern Comfort | Cassandra | |
| 2010 | The Dish & the Spoon | Rose | |
| 2011 | No Strings Attached | Patrice | |
| 2011 | Damsels in Distress | Violet Wister | |
| 2011 | Arthur | Naomi Quinn | |
| 2012 | Lola Versus | Lola | |
| 2012 | To Rome with Love | Sally | |
| 2012 | Frances Ha | Frances Halladay | |
| 2014 | Eden | Julia | |
| 2014 | The Humbling | Pegeen Mike Stapleford | |
| 2015 | Mistress America | Brooke Cardinas | |
| 2015 | Maggie's Plan | Maggie Hardin | |
| 2016 | Wiener-Dog | Dawn Wiener | |
| 2016 | Jackie | Nancy Tuckerman | |
| 2016 | 20th Century Women | Abigail Porter | |
| 2017 | The Meyerowitz Stories | Victoria | Voice; Uncredited |
| 2018 | Isle of Dogs | Tracy Walker | Voice |
| 2022 | White Noise | Babette Gladney | |
| 2025 | Jay Kelly | Lois Sukenick | |

=== Television ===
| Year | Title | Role | Notes |
|---|---|---|---|
| 2009 | A NY Thing | Tamera | Television film |
| 2011–2015 | China, IL | Pony Merks | Main cast, voice |
| 2012 | The Corrections | Julia Vrais | Unsold, unfinished pilot |
| 2014 | How I Met Your Dad | Sally | Lead character, unsold pilot |
| 2015 | Portlandia | Mermaid | Episode: "Doug Becomes a Feminist" |
| 2016 | The Mindy Project | Sarah Branum | 2 episodes |
| 2017 | Saturday Night Live | Ms. Reynolds | Uncredited; episode: "Saoirse Ronan/U2" |
| 2021 | The Ghost and Molly McGee | Herself | Voice; episode: "Hooray for Mollywood!" |

=== Theatre ===
| Year | Title | Role | Playwright | Venue | Refs. |
|---|---|---|---|---|---|
| 2014 | The Village Bike | Becky | Penelope Skinner | MCC Theater, Off-Broadway | |

=== Music video ===
| Year | Song | Artist | Notes | Refs. |
|---|---|---|---|---|
| 2023 | "Dance the Night" | Dua Lipa | Cameo | |

== Filmmaking credits ==
| Year | Title | Director | Writer | Producer | Notes |
|---|---|---|---|---|---|
| 2007 | Hannah Takes the Stairs | No | Yes | No | |
| 2008 | Nights and Weekends | Yes | Yes | Yes | Co-directed with Joe Swanberg |
| 2010 | Northern Comfort | No | Yes | No | |
| 2012 | Frances Ha | No | Yes | No | |
| 2015 | Mistress America | No | Yes | Yes | |
| 2017 | Lady Bird | Yes | Yes | No | |
| 2019 | Little Women | Yes | Yes | No | |
| 2023 | Barbie | Yes | Yes | Executive | |
| 2027 | Narnia: The Magician's Nephew | Yes | Yes | Yes | Post-production |

== Awards and nominations ==
In 2011, Gerwig won an award from the Athena Film Festival for her artistry as one of Hollywood's definitive screen actresses of her generation. In 2018, her nomination for Best Director at the 90th Academy Awards for Lady Bird made her the first woman in eight years (and one of only five women in Oscar history) to have been nominated in that category. Gerwig's work on Lady Bird was nominated for sixteen awards in notable circuits, winning six of those awards.

Awards and nominations received by Gerwig's films
| Year | Title | Academy Awards | | BAFTA Awards | | Golden Globe Awards | |
| Year | Title | Nominations | Wins | Nominations | Wins | Nominations | Wins |
|---|---|---|---|---|---|---|---|
| 2017 | Lady Bird | 5 | | 3 | | 4 | 2 |
| 2019 | Little Women | 6 | 1 | 5 | 1 | 2 | |
| 2023 | Barbie | 8 | 1 | 5 | | 9 | 2 |
| Total | | 19 | 2 | 13 | 1 | 15 | 4 |

Directed Academy Award performances
Under Gerwig's direction, these actors have received Academy Award nominations for their performances in their respective roles.

| Year | Performer | Film | Result |
Academy Award for Best Actress
| 2017 | Saoirse Ronan | Lady Bird | Nominated |
| 2019 | Saoirse Ronan | Little Women | Nominated |
Academy Award for Best Supporting Actor
| 2023 | Ryan Gosling | Barbie | Nominated |
Academy Award for Best Supporting Actress
| 2017 | Laurie Metcalf | Lady Bird | Nominated |
| 2019 | Florence Pugh | Little Women | Nominated |
| 2023 | America Ferrera | Barbie | Nominated |

== See also ==
- List of directors associated with art film
- List of female film and television directors
