= Kissing on the Mouth =

- Directed by: Joe Swanberg
- Written by: Kevin Pittman; Joe Swanberg; Kris Swanberg; Kate Winterich
- Produced by: Joe Swanberg
- Starring: Kevin Pittman; Joe Swanberg; Kris Swanberg; Kate Winterich
- Cinematography: Joe Swanberg
- Edited by: Joe Swanberg
- Distributed by: Film1
- Release date: March 12, 2005; (SXSW)
- Running time: 78 minutes
- Country: United States
- Language: English

Kissing on the Mouth is a 2005 American film directed by Joe Swanberg. It is considered one of the original films of the mumblecore movement.

== Plot ==
Ellen is sleeping with her ex-boyfriend while trying to ignore the fact that he's looking for more than just sex. Her roommate, Patrick, isn't helping matters with his secretive and jealous behavior.

== Cast ==
- Kate Winterich – Ellen
- Joe Swanberg – Patrick
- Kevin Pittman – Chris Bucket
- Kris Swanberg – Laura
- Julie VanDeWeghe – Model

== See also ==
- List of American films of 2005
