= Lace Crater =

2015 comedy film by Harrison Atkins

- Film festival poster
- Directed by: Harrison Atkins
- Written by: Harrison Atkins
- Produced by: Lawrence Dai; Adam Kritzer; Joe Swanberg
- Starring: Lindsay Burdge; Peter Vack; Jennifer Kim; Joe Swanberg; Andrew Ryder; Keith Poulson; Chase Williamson
- Cinematography: Gideon de Villiers
- Edited by: Harrison Atkins
- Music by: Alan Palomo
- Production company: Forager Films
- Distributed by: Invincible Pictures
- Release dates: September 15, 2015 (TIFF); July 29, 2016 (United States)
- Running time: 83 minutes
- Country: United States
- Language: English

Lace Crater is a 2015 American comedy film written and directed by Harrison Atkins; the film marks his first feature full-length film. The film stars Lindsay Burdge, Peter Vack, Chase Williamson, Joe Swanberg, Jennifer Kim, Keith Poulson and Andrew Ryder. The film had its world premiere on September 15, 2015 in the Vanguard section of the 2015 Toronto International Film Festival. The film had its American premiere at the Cucalorus Film Festival on November 13, 2015. The film was released in a limited release and through video on demand on July 29, 2016, by Invincible Pictures.

== Plot ==
An awkward twenty-something begins to go through strange physical changes after a weekend tryst with a ghost.

== Cast ==
- Lindsay Burdge as Ruth
- Peter Vack as Michael
- Joe Swanberg as Dean
- Chase Williamson as Ryan
- Jennifer Kim as Claudette
- Keith Poulson as Keith
- Andrew Ryder as Andrew

== Production ==
Principal photography began on November 30, 2014, and concluded on December 21, 2014.

== Release ==
On September 11, 2015, a teaser trailer from the film was released. The film had its world premiere at the 2015 Toronto International Film Festival on September 15, 2015. It also screened at the Sitges Film Festival on October 15, 2015. It had its American premiere at the Cucalorus Film Festival on November 13, 2015. The film was released on July 29, 2016.
