= Nights and Weekends =

- Directed by: Joe Swanberg; Greta Gerwig
- Written by: Joe Swanberg; Greta Gerwig
- Produced by: Greta Gerwig; Anish Savjani; Dia Sokol; Joe Swanberg
- Starring: Greta Gerwig; Joe Swanberg; Alison Bagnall; Elizabeth Donius; Jay Duplass; Kent Osborne; Lynn Shelton; Ellen Stagg; Suyash Pachauri; Jesse Cilio
- Cinematography: Matthias Grunsky; Benjamin Kasulke
- Edited by: Joe Swanberg
- Production company: Film Science
- Distributed by: IFC Films
- Release dates: March 2008 (South by Southwest Film Festival); October 10, 2008 (United States)
- Running time: 80 minutes
- Country: United States
- Language: English
- Budget: $15,000
- Box office: $5,430

Nights and Weekends is a 2008 American mumblecore film written, directed, co-produced by and starring Joe Swanberg and Greta Gerwig, marking Gerwig's directorial debut. The film follows a long-distance relationship and its aftermath.

The film premiered at South by Southwest, screened within such festivals as Maryland Film Festival, and was released theatrically in the United States on October 10, 2008.

== Plot ==
The film recounts a long-distance relationship between two people, one of whom lives in Chicago, the other in New York City. The first half of the film follows their relationship while the second half focuses on the dissolution and potential continuation of it, which occurs a year after the events of the first half of the film.

== Cast ==
- Alison Bagnall as Reporter
- Elizabeth Donius as James' brother's wife
- Jay Duplass as James' brother
- Greta Gerwig as Mattie
- Kent Osborne as Mattie's sister's boyfriend
- Lynn Shelton as Mattie's sister
- Ellen Stagg as Photographer
- Joe Swanberg as James
- Suyash Pachauri as OTT
- Jesse Cilio as the Neighbor

== Production ==
The second half of the film was shot a year after the first half, mirroring the timeline of the story.

Greta Gerwig described filming the nude love scenes as "kind of an awful experience".

== Release ==
=== Critical reception ===
On review aggregator website Rotten Tomatoes, the film has an approval rating of 85% based on 20 reviews, with an average rating of 6.8/10. On Metacritic, which assigns a weighted average rating to reviews, the film has a weighted average score of 59 out of 100, based on 6 critics, indicating "mixed or average reviews".

=== Accolades ===
Nights and Weekends producer Dia Sokol Savage was nominated for the Piaget Producers Award at the 25th Independent Spirit Awards.
