= Joe Swanberg =

American filmmaker

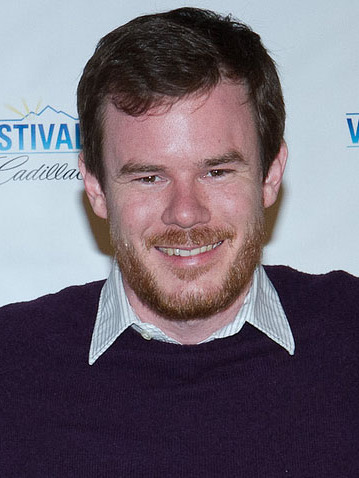
- Swanberg in 2014
- Born: Detroit, Michigan, U.S.
- Occupations: Director; producer; writer; editor; actor
- Years active: 2005–present
- Notable work: Easy; Drinking Buddies
- Spouse: Kris Williams (m. 2007; div. 2019)
- Children: 2
- Website: joeswanberg.com

Joe Swanberg is an American independent filmmaker. Known for micro-budget films which make extensive use of improvisation, Swanberg is considered a major figure in the mumblecore film movement. His films often focus on relationships, sex, technology, and the filmmaking process. He is also known for his early collaborations with Greta Gerwig.

== Early life ==
Swanberg was born in Detroit, Michigan and raised in Georgia, California, Kwajalein, Marshall Islands and Alabama. He graduated from Naperville Central High School in suburban Chicago and attended Southern Illinois University at Carbondale as a film major, earning a bachelor's degree in 2003. As a teenager, he worked at Hollywood Video.

== Career ==
In 2005, Swanberg wrote, directed, edited, shot, produced, and starred in Kissing on the Mouth, his first feature film, for a modest budget. He followed it with LOL (2006), which marked Swanberg's first time working with actress Greta Gerwig. Gerwig and Swanberg collaborated on the director's next two features: Hannah Takes the Stairs (2007), which also starred filmmakers Andrew Bujalski, Ry Russo-Young, and Mark Duplass and marked Swanberg's first collaboration with animator and actor Kent Osborne; and Nights and Weekends (2008), on which Gerwig shared a directing credit. Swanberg's next feature, Alexander the Last, was produced by Noah Baumbach, who later cast Gerwig in his 2010 film Greenberg.

After spending all of 2009 working on Silver Bullets, Swanberg finished seven features in 2010: Uncle Kent, Caitlin Plays Herself, The Zone, Art History, Silver Bullets, Privacy Setting and Autoerotic (co-directed with horror filmmaker Adam Wingard). Uncle Kent premiered at the Sundance Film Festival in January 2011 and Silver Bullets and Art History premiered at the Berlinale in February. The rest of the 2010 films premiered theatrically in 2011 after screenings at film festivals. Four of these were later included in Joe Swanberg: Collected Films 2011, a DVD boxed set from the music and video label Factory 25.

In 2012, Swanberg wrote and directed the film Drinking Buddies, starring Olivia Wilde, Jake Johnson, Anna Kendrick and Ron Livingston. The film was acquired by Magnolia Pictures shortly after its SXSW premiere.

The following year. Swanberg shot Happy Christmas, starring himself, Melanie Lynskey, Lena Dunham, and Anna Kendrick. This was the first of his films to be shot on 16mm film, rather than digitally. The film premiered at the 2014 Sundance Film Festival.

His next film as director was Digging for Fire, which premiered at the 2015 Sundance Film Festival and stars Jake Johnson. The film was released on August 21, 2015, by The Orchard.

Swanberg wrote, directed, and produced Easy, an anthology series for Netflix. The series premiered in 2016 and ran for three seasons, ending in 2019. Easy featured many of Swanberg's frequent collaborators from his films, including Jake Johnson, Joe Lo Truglio, and Nicky Excitement.

In 2017, Swanberg and Jake Johnson co-wrote Win It All. Johnson stars with Aislinn Derbez, Joe Lo Truglio and Keegan-Michael Key. The film had its world premiere at South by Southwest on March 11, 2017. It was released on April 7, 2017, by Netflix.

Swanberg is a noted proponent of Internet-based distribution for independent films and has made his 2011 feature Marriage Material available for free on his Vimeo page. He also released his 2020 feature, Build the Wall, starring Kent Osborne and Jane Adams, on his Vimeo page.

In 2021, Swanberg opened Analog Pizza and Video Store, a VHS video rental shop in the back room of Borelli's Pizzeria in Chicago.

In 2024, it was announced that he is working on a slate of five horror-themed feature films for Yale Entertainment. Swanberg confirmed at SXSW that all five features will be released by Cineverse through their Screambox streaming service in 2026.

In August 2025, it was reported that Swanberg would direct his first feature in a decade, The Sun Never Sets, starring Jake Johnson and Dakota Fanning. The movie had its world premiere at South by Southwest on March 13, 2026.

== Influences ==
Swanberg cites Elaine May, Paul Mazursky, Lars von Trier, Marco Ferreri, and Eric Rohmer as primary influences on his work.

== Filmography ==
=== Film ===
Year	Film	Director	Writer	Producer	Editor	Cinematographer	Notes
2005	Kissing on the Mouth	Yes	Yes	Yes	Yes	Yes	
2006	LOL	Yes	Yes	Yes	Yes	Yes	
2007	Hannah Takes the Stairs	Yes	Yes	Yes	Yes	Yes	
2008	Nights and Weekends	Yes	Yes	Yes	Yes	No	Co-directed with Greta Gerwig
2009	Alexander the Last	Yes	Yes	Yes	Yes	Yes	Co-produced with Noah Baumbach
2009	It Was Great but I Was Ready to Come Home	No	No	Yes	No	No	
2010	11/4/08	No	No	No	No	Yes	Documentary film
2010	Open Five	No	No	No	No	Yes	
2011	Uncle Kent	Yes	Yes	Yes	Yes	Yes	
2011	What Fun We Were Having: 4 Stories About Date Rape	No	No	Yes	No	No	
2011	Silver Bullets	Yes	Yes	Yes	Yes	Yes	Also sound
2011	Caitlin Plays Herself	Yes	Yes	Yes	Yes	Yes	
2011	Autoerotic	Yes	Yes	Yes	No	No	Co-directed with Adam Wingard, also special make-up effects
2011	Art History	Yes	Yes	Yes	Yes	Yes	
2011	The Zone	Yes	Yes	Yes	Yes	Yes	
2012	V/H/S	Segment director	No	Segment producer	Segment editor	No	Segment: "The Sick Thing That Happened to Emily When She Was Younger", also sound designer of the segment
2012	Marriage Material	Yes	Yes	Yes	Yes	No	
2012	All the Light in the Sky	Yes	Yes	Yes	Yes	Yes	
2013	Drinking Buddies	Yes	Yes	Yes	Yes	No	
2013	24 Exposures	Yes	Yes	No	Yes	No	
2014	Happy Christmas	Yes	Yes	Yes	Yes	No	
2015	Digging for Fire	Yes	Yes	Yes	Yes	No	
2015	Queen of Earth	No	No	Yes	No	No	Also associate producer
2015	Bloomin Mud Shuffle	No	No	Yes	No	No	
2015	Lace Crater	No	No	Yes	No	No	
2017	Win It All	Yes	Yes	Yes	Yes	No	
2020	The Rental	No	Yes	Yes	No	No	
2020	Build the Wall	Yes	Yes	No	Yes	Yes	
2023	The Becomers	No	No	Yes	No	No	
2024	Invader	No	No	Yes	No	No	Stars as "Invader" role
2026	The Sun Never Sets	Yes	Yes	Yes	Yes	No	Post-production
2026	Yellow Eyes	No	No	Yes	No	No	VOD

=== As executive producer ===
Year	Film
2015	Uncle Kent 2
2016	Little Sister
2017	Person to Person
2017	Golden Exits
2018	Madeline's Madeline
2019	Sword of Trust
2019	Depraved
2019	Holy Trinity

=== Short film ===
Year	Film	Director	Writer	Producer	Cinematographer	Editor
2003	Mikey	Yes	Uncredited	Uncredited	Yes	Uncredited
2005	Hissy Fits	Yes	Uncredited	Yes	No	Uncredited
2006	Thanks for the Ad!	Yes	Yes	Yes	Yes	Yes
2008	Swedish Blueballs	Yes	Yes	Yes	Yes	No
2008	About Film Festivals	No	No	No	Yes	No
2008	Ginger Sand	No	No	No	Yes	No
2009	Birthday Suit	Yes	Yes	Yes	No	No
2009	One Shot Film	Yes	Yes	Yes	Yes	Yes
2010	The World of Film Festivals	No	No	No	Yes	No
2012	Stray Bullets	Yes	Yes	Yes	Yes	Yes
2013	Privacy Setting	Yes	Yes	Yes	Yes	Yes

=== Acting roles ===
Year	Film	Role	Notes
2005	Kissing on the Mouth	Patrick	
2006	LOL	Tim	
2006	Young American Bodies	Ben	TV series
2007	Hohokam	The Jeffery	
2007	Quiet City	Adam	
2008	Present Company	Archibald King	
2008	Nights and Weekends	James	
2009	You Wont Miss Me		
2009	Cabin Fever 2: Spring Fever	Hazmat Team	
2009	The Mountain, the River and the Road	Tom	
2010	Everyone Says I Look Just Like Her	Brandon	
2010	A Horrible Way to Die	Kevin	
2010	Blackmail Boys	Andrew Kenneth Tucker	
2010	Audrey the Trainwreck	Jeremy Roth	
2011	Uncle Kent	Joe	
2011	Silver Bullets	Ethan	
2011	Caitlin Plays Herself	Joe	
2011	Autoerotic		
2011	Art History	Sam	
2011	You're Next	Drake Davison	
2011	The Zone	Joe	
2012	The Kings of Yorktown	Bartender	
2012	V/H/S	Sam	Segment: "Second Honeymoon"
2012	Marriage Material	Joe	
2013	Detonator	Sid	
2013	Drinking Buddies	Angry Car Guy	
2013	White Reindeer	George	
2013	The Sacrament	Jake	
2013	Proxy	Patrick Michaels	
2014	Happy Christmas	Jeff	
2014	Thou Wast Mild and Lovely	Akin	
2014	Empire Builder	The Husband	
2015	There	Toth	
2015	Uncle Kent 2	Joe	
2015	Bloomin Mud Shuffle	Brock	
2015	Lace Crater	Dean	
2016	Joshy	Aaron	
2017	XX	Singing Panda	Segment "The Birthday Party"
2021	Offseason	George Darrow	
2024	Invention	John	
2024	Invader	Invader	

=== Television ===
Year	Film	Director	Writer	Producer	Editor	Notes
2006–2009	Young American Bodies	Yes	Yes	Yes	Yes	23 episodes Webseries; Also creator, cinematographer and camera operator
2014	Looking	Yes	No	No	No	Episode "Looking in the Mirror"
2016–2017	Love	Yes	No	No	No	3 episodes
2016–2019	Easy	Yes	Yes	Yes	Yes	25 episodes Also creator
2019	Soundtrack	Yes	No	No	No	2 episodes
