= Alexander the Last =

- Directed by: Joe Swanberg
- Written by: Joe Swanberg
- Produced by: Noah Baumbach; Joe Swanberg; Anish Savjani
- Starring: Jess Weixler; Justin Rice; Barlow Jacobs; Amy Seimetz
- Cinematography: Joe Swanberg
- Edited by: Joe Swanberg
- Music by: Justin Rice; Jo Schornikow
- Distributed by: IFC Films
- Release date: March 14, 2009
- Running time: 72 minutes
- Country: United States
- Language: English

Alexander the Last is a 2009 American drama film written and directed by Joe Swanberg and starring Jess Weixler, Justin Rice, Barlow Jacobs, and Amy Seimetz. The film is about a married actress and her sister. The film premiered in 2009 and was released on DVD in 2010.

== Plot summary ==
Alex is an actress who is attracted to her co-star Jamie, who stars alongside her in a local theater play. Alex is also married to an independent musician named Elliott. When Elliott goes on tour with his music, Alex lets Jamie sleep on her couch and flirts with him. Alex continues to fall in love with Jamie while Jamie has a relationship with her sister. The film concludes with Alex being remorseful for her actions.

== Production ==
Swanberg stated that he worked "more collaboratively" with other people than he did on his earlier films. The producers were Anish Savhani and Noah Baumbach. Baumbach was Swanberg's main off-set creative consultant and he helped with the film after viewing the director's previous film Hannah Takes the Stairs. Working with Baumbach made Swanberg become a more self-confident director. Swanberg said that his films need to provide what does not exist, while also competing with the moments that are on YouTube and Facebook. He also said: "Alexander The Last is when I’ve reached my conclusions about certain things". The film was shot with an HD Handycam. The leads in the film are also the screenwriters.

== Release ==
Alexander the Last debuted at the South by Southwest film festival and as a part of IFC Films Festival Direct video on demand service on March 14, 2009. The film was released on DVD in 2010 with some deleted scenes that are hosted by Swanberg.

== Reception ==
On review aggregator Rotten Tomatoes, 67% of 12 critics gave the film a positive review, with an average rating of 5.9/10.

Richard Brody of The New Yorker wrote: "Alexander the Last is a significant advance over Swanberg's other films; his camera work—and he does indeed do the camera work—is more careful and more controlled, and his images are by and large more expressive, not merely revelatory of performance (as they were, for the most part, in his earlier films). Entertainment Weekly reviewer Owen Gleiberman compared the film to other mumblecore films, saying, "But Alexander the Last is better than that – fresher, deeper, and more mysterious".
