= Yelling Fire in an Empty Theater =

- Directed by: Justin Zuckerman
- Written by: Justin Zuckerman
- Produced by: Ryan Martin Brown
- Starring: Isadora Leiva; Kelly Cooper; Michael Patrick Nicholson
- Edited by: Justin Zuckerman
- Production company: 5th Floor Pictures
- Distributed by: Cinedigm
- Release dates: January 27, 2022 (Slamdance); January 24, 2023 (United States)
- Running time: 72 minutes
- Country: United States
- Language: English

Yelling Fire in an Empty Theater is an independent American comedy-drama film written and directed by Justin Zuckerman. It premiered at the 2022 Slamdance Film Festival, and was released on Fandor on January 24, 2023.

== Plot ==
The film follows Lisa, a recent college graduate, who moves from Florida to New York into an apartment with an often-bickering couple. The plot follows Lisa as she meets new friends and experiences the city.

== Cast ==
- Isadora Leiva as Lisa
- Kelly Cooper as Holly
- Michael Patrick Nicholson as Bill
- Ryan Martin Brown as Eric
- Austin Cassel as Sean
- Colin Burgess as Doug
- Krista Jensen as Debra

== Production ==
The film was produced by Ryan Martin Brown and 5th Floor Pictures. It was filmed on a mini-DV camcorder on a very small budget. Director Justin Zuckerman said he liked the playful aesthetic and look of mini-DV.

== Release ==
The film premiered at the Slamdance Film Festival on January 27, 2022, where it was nominated for Best Narrative Feature. It won the Audience Choice Award for Best Feature at the 2022 Tallahassee Film Festival. On January 18, 2023, Cinedigm announced that it had acquired the North American rights to the film, and that it would be released on Cinedigm's streaming platform Fandor starting on January 24, 2023.
