= Digging for Fire =

2015 film by Joe Swanberg

- Theatrical release poster
- Directed by: Joe Swanberg
- Written by: Joe Swanberg; Jake Johnson
- Produced by: Joe Swanberg; Alicia Van Couvering; Jake Johnson
- Starring: Jake Johnson; Rosemarie DeWitt; Orlando Bloom; Brie Larson; Sam Rockwell; Mike Birbiglia; Anna Kendrick
- Cinematography: Ben Richardson
- Edited by: Joe Swanberg
- Music by: Dan Romer
- Production company: Lucky Coffee Productions
- Distributed by: The Orchard; Sony Pictures Worldwide
- Release dates: January 26, 2015 (Sundance); August 21, 2015 (U.S.)
- Running time: 83 minutes
- Country: United States
- Language: English
- Box office: $119,000

Digging for Fire is a 2015 American comedy-drama film directed by Joe Swanberg and co-written by Swanberg and Jake Johnson. It stars an ensemble cast led by Johnson, Rosemarie DeWitt, Brie Larson, Sam Rockwell, Anna Kendrick, Orlando Bloom and Mike Birbiglia. Johnson and DeWitt play a married couple who find a gun and a bone in the backyard of a house they are staying in.

The film's plot was inspired by a similar incident in which Johnson discovered a gun and a bone in his backyard. Instead of a traditional script, he and Swanberg wrote an outline that summarized the plot but included no dialogue. They cast the film mainly by contacting their friends and other actors who they knew had enjoyed their previous work. It was filmed over 15 days in Los Angeles County, California. Swanberg dedicated the film to filmmaker Paul Mazursky.

Digging for Fire premiered at the 2015 Sundance Film Festival on January 26, 2015. It was released in theaters on August 21, 2015, by The Orchard and on video on demand on August 25, 2015. The film was generally well received by critics.

== Plot ==
Lee, a yoga instructor, brings her husband Tim, a gym teacher, and their 3-year-old son Jude to house-sit in a client's house for a few weeks while the client is away. While walking around the property, Tim finds a gun and a bone in the backyard. At first he wants to dig up the surrounding ground to see if a body is buried there, but Lee convinces him it is a bad idea.

When Lee and Jude leave for the weekend to stay with her parents so that Tim can work without distraction on the family's taxes, he invites a group of friends—including Ray, Phil, Adam, and Paul—to the house for the night. After a few drinks, they decide to dig up the backyard together, quickly finding another bone and a license plate. Phil, who is skeptical about the digging, leaves with Adam and Paul as Tim's friend Billy and call girls Alicia and Max arrive at the house. Billy pairs off with Alicia and Ray with Max while Tim continues to dig. He finds a shoe before deciding to go to sleep.

The next morning, Tim is visited by a neighbor who warns him that digging for buried items in the backyard is a bad idea and says that the site was once the "Chicano Hall of Fame". Soon afterwards, Max returns to pick up her purse and finds Tim digging again. She joins him and discovers a plastic bag filled with bones. Meanwhile, Lee goes to visit her sister Squiggy and brother-in-law Bob for an afternoon after complaining to her mother that she no longer feels she has an identity outside of being a mother and wife.

Phil returns to the house and, seeing Tim with Max, assumes that Tim is cheating on Lee. Tim and Max go out to dinner and Tim confesses that he feels his marriage to Lee has deteriorated since they had a child. Lee goes to a bar alone, where she meets Ben. When Ben is punched by another man at the bar, she accompanies him to visit Alicia, who is a medical student and a friend of his, so that Alicia can suture his wound. As Tim and Max smoke marijuana together at the house, Ben cooks dinner for Lee.

Max leaves the house when Ray reappears and Tim accuses Ray of ruining his night. Lee and Ben make their way to the beach and share a kiss. Tim returns to the backyard and uncovers a ring and what appears to be a human hand before he decides to stop digging. He throws everything he has found back into the hole he has dug before starting to fill it in. He walks back up to the house and, finding Lee waiting for him, kisses her. The next morning, they pack up their belongings and go to pick up Jude.

== Cast ==
- Jake Johnson as Tim
- Rosemarie DeWitt as Lee
- Brie Larson as Max
- Sam Rockwell as Ray
- Anna Kendrick as Alicia
- Orlando Bloom as Ben
- Mike Birbiglia as Phil
- Kent Osborne as Adam
- Sam Elliott as Pop Pop
- Judith Light as Grandma
- Ron Livingston as Bob
- Melanie Lynskey as Squiggy
- Jenny Slate as Yoga Couple
- Timothy Simons as Yoga Couple
- Jane Adams as Woman on beach
- Chris Messina as Billy T
- Steve Berg as Paul
- Lindsay Burdge as Lucy

== Production ==
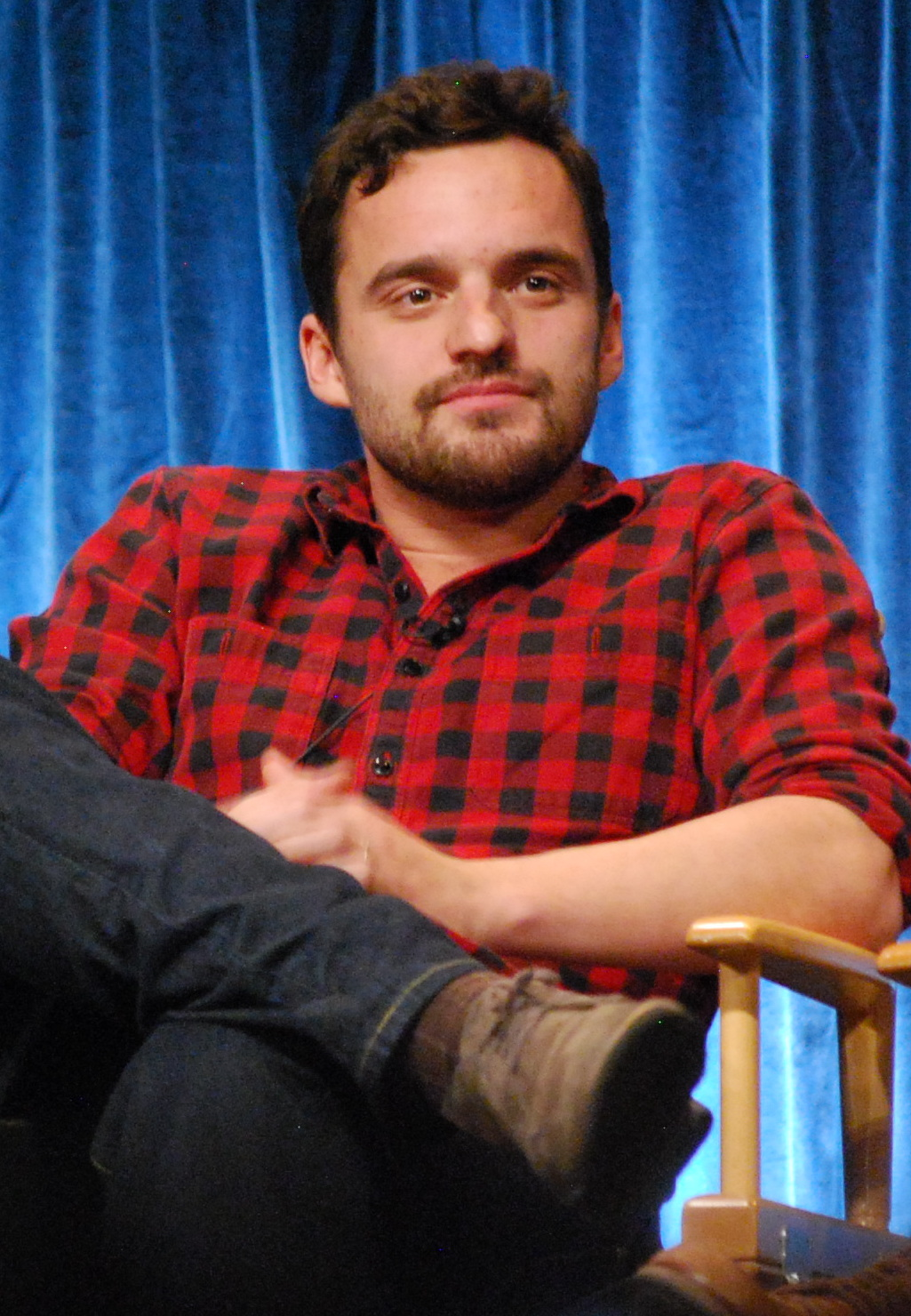
Digging for Fire was inspired by a real incident in which Jake Johnson (pictured) dug up a bone and a gun in his backyard.

Digging for Fire was based on a real incident in which Jake Johnson and his wife dug up a bone and a gun in the garden of a house they had rented. Over a couple of weeks, he and a group of his friends dug up various objects before deciding to bury them again. Johnson described the experience to Joe Swanberg about three years later and they decided to make a film about it. They wrote a two-and-a-half–page outline that summarized the plot but included no dialogue or detailed character descriptions. Swanberg wanted the actors to improvise the details of each scene and allowed them to make choices about their characters: for instance, Orlando Bloom decided that his character would ride a motorcycle, Chris Messina suggested that his character go swimming naked, and Brie Larson persuaded Johnson and Swanberg that her character would not be sexually attracted to Tim.

Digging for Fire features an ensemble cast, the largest Swanberg had worked with at the time. He and Johnson cast the film by contacting friends and other actors who they knew had enjoyed their previous film together, Drinking Buddies. Rosemarie DeWitt and Swanberg decided to work together after her husband, Ron Livingston, starred in Drinking Buddies. Unlike the other actors, Orlando Bloom was cast through an agent. Swanberg cast his own son, Jude, as the three-year-old son of the lead characters.

The film was shot over 15 days in Los Angeles and Malibu, California. Swanberg and cinematographer Ben Richardson decided to shoot on 35 mm film rather than digitally, as most of Swanberg's previous films had been made. They decided to shoot on film, Richardson said, because "there is a certain visual integrity to a film-derived image that is still lacking for me in most of the digitally-derived imagery that we see". Although the film's dialogue was improvised, the actors rehearsed each scene before filming so that the scene could be blocked out due to the constraints of working with film rather than digital.

Swanberg found the process of editing Digging for Fire more difficult than for his previous films, since there were many different possibilities of how to integrate the separate storylines involving Tim and Lee. He dedicated the film to Paul Mazursky, who died in 2014, because of the influence Mazursky had on Swanberg's work and because of the thematic similarities between Mazursky's work (particularly the 1969 film Bob & Carol & Ted & Alice) and Digging for Fire.

== Release ==
The film had its world premiere at the Sundance Film Festival on January 26, 2015. Shortly after its premiere, The Orchard and Sony Pictures Worldwide acquired North American and international distribution rights respectively. The film went to be shown at the Chattanooga Film Festival, Sarasota Film Festival, Chicago Critics Film Festival, Maryland Film Festival, and Traverse City Film Festival. The film was given a limited release in American theaters on August 21, 2015, earning $25,000 from three locations on its opening weekend. It later expanded to 30 theaters and earned a total of $119,364 from its 38-day run. It was released on video on demand on August 25, 2015.

== Reception ==
Digging for Fire has been met with generally positive reviews from critics. On the review aggregator site Rotten Tomatoes, the film holds a 66% approval rating, based on 67 reviews with an average rating of 6.15/10. The site's consensus states: "Digging for Fire finds director/co-writer Joe Swanberg working from a familiar palette, but in ways that suggest he's taking new and exciting strides as a filmmaker." On Metacritic, the film has a score of 69 out of 100 based on reviews from 22 critics, indicating "generally favorable" reviews.

Film critic Richard Roeper described Digging for Fire as "a movie made by someone who clearly loves the art of movies" and praised the casting and editing. A. O. Scott of The New York Times wrote of the film's "appealing honesty" and its "tight, satisfying narrative". Variety's Ben Kenigsberg characterized the film as "a lovely slice of everything and nothing" and gave particular praise to the cinematography, editing and improvisation. Peter Travers, who awarded the film 3 out of 4 stars in a review for Rolling Stone, highlighted the performances, cinematography and score, and felt that Digging for Fire showed Swanberg to be "a true filmmaker". Screen International critic Tim Grierson found the film to be honest and insightful, and drew particular attention to Johnson and DeWitt's "nimble, low-key performances". An Banh of Indiewire opined that the film was the most "emotionally mature" of Swanberg's works and that each of the actors gave "purposeful, plot-driven performances" in spite of the large cast.

The Austin Chronicle's Kimberley Jones, on the other hand, felt that the story suffered because of the large cast and wrote that "mostly it's just a toe listlessly pushing dirt around". Michael Phillips of the Chicago Tribune praised Ben Richardson's cinematography and "natural tone" of the acting but felt that the dialogue was lacking, giving the film 2 out of 4 stars. The San Francisco Chronicle's G. Allen Johnson also criticized the "forced and uninteresting" dialogue and thought that the story and characters felt "phony". The Boston Globe critic Ty Burr found the film uninsightful, writing that "Swanberg is tilling soil here that has been churned since humanity began", and felt that the plot focused too much on Tim rather than Lee. Chris Nashawaty gave the film a C+ grade in Entertainment Weekly, dismissing it as "Joe Swanberg's latest meditation on aging-hipster malaise".
