= Art History (film) =

- Directed by: Joe Swanberg
- Written by: Joe Swanberg; Josephine Decker; Kent Osborne
- Produced by: Joe Swanberg
- Starring: Josephine Decker; Kent Osborne; Adam Wingard; Kris Swanberg
- Cinematography: Adam Wingard; Joe Swanberg
- Edited by: Joe Swanberg
- Production company: Swanberry Productions
- Distributed by: Factory 25
- Release date: September 23, 2011
- Running time: 74 minutes
- Country: United States
- Language: English

Art History is a 2011 American drama film directed by Joe Swanberg, written by Swanberg, Josephine Decker, and Kent Osborne. It stars Decker, Swanberg, Osborne, Adam Wingard, and Kris Swanberg as filmmakers whose lives are complicated by a graphic sex scene in an arthouse film.

== Premise ==
While filming a difficult, graphic sex scene for an arthouse film, Juliette and Eric, the two actors involved, begin an off-screen affair. The director, Sam, becomes jealous of their relationship, complicating his working relationship with them.

== Cast ==
- Josephine Decker as Juliette
- Joe Swanberg as Sam
- Kent Osborne as Eric
- Adam Wingard as Bill
- Kris Swanberg as Hillary

== Release ==
Art History premiered at the 2011 Berlin International Film Festival.

== Reception ==
Metacritic, a review aggregator, rated the film 36/100 based on four reviews. Joe Weissberg of Variety wrote, "Future art historians may use Joe Swanberg's latest to illustrate the paucity of ideas and means in the 2010s." Neil Genzlinger of The New York Times called the premise "tediously obvious". Michelle Orange of The Village Voice complimented the lighting and mood, which she said do not make up for the lack of story or character development.

Richard Brody of The New Yorker wrote that detractors who compare it to Ingmar Bergman's Persona miss the point, though Brody says Swanberg's images are "of a kind" to those Bergman shot in the 1950s and 1960s. Erik Kohn of Indiewire described it as "essentially Swanberg's version of Zack and Miri Make a Porno, and, within the larger context of his career, just as inconsequential". Jesse Cataldo of Slant Magazine rated it 3/4 stars and wrote, "Art History stands out as one of his most visually and conceptually accomplished experiments." Christopher Bourne of Twitch Film called it "a complex and unsettling examination of the creative process" and its psychological pressures.
