= Silver Bullets =

- Theatrical release poster
- Directed by: Joe Swanberg
- Written by: Joe Swanberg
- Produced by: Joe Swanberg; Amy Seimetz
- Starring: Kate Lyn Sheil; Ti West; Larry Fessenden; Joe Swanberg; Amy Seimetz
- Cinematography: Joe Swanberg
- Edited by: Joe Swanberg
- Music by: Orange Mighty Trio
- Production company: Swanberry Productions
- Distributed by: Factory 25
- Release dates: February 12, 2011 (Berlin Film Festival); October 28, 2011 (United States)
- Running time: 70 minutes
- Country: United States

Silver Bullets is a 2011 American psychological thriller film written and directed by Joe Swanberg. The film stars Kate Lyn Sheil, Ti West, Swanberg and Amy Seimetz. It is one of six films released by Swanberg in 2011. The film had its world premiere at the Berlin Film Festival on February 12, 2011, and was then released in a limited release on October 28, 2011, by Factory25.

== Plot ==
Actress Claire (Sheil) has been cast in the lead role, as a werewolf, in the upcoming movie Silver Bullets by indie horror filmmaker Ben (West). Her boyfriend Ethan (Swanberg) is also a filmmaker, though aimless and self-doubting in contrast to Ben's confidence. Ethan decides to cast Claire's best friend Charlie (Seimetz) as his character's girlfriend in his next movie, and the two film some love scenes together, which Claire is unhappy about. Claire is further thrown into turmoil after Ben tries to kiss her.

== Cast ==
- Kate Lyn Sheil as Claire
- Ti West as Ben
- Larry Fessenden as Sam
- Jane Adams as June
- Joe Swanberg as Ethan
- Amy Seimetz as Charlie

== Release ==
The film had its world premiere at the Berlin Film Festival on February 12, 2011. and screened at SXSW on March 13, 2011. The film was released in a limited release by Factory25 on October 28, 2011.

== Reception ==
Richard Brody of The New Yorker named it the 9th best film of 2011 Variety stated that the film "probably contains Swanberg's clearest exposition of his philosophy, yet its sad aimlessness, from the mouth of an unhappy director (played by the helmer), elicits only a begrudging pity." A review in The A.V. Club stated that "Silver Bullets’ introspection feels earned", but that the film "splinters into an ending that isn’t entirely satisfying, though a prologue and epilogue suggest these issues of control and the line between pretense and reality continue throughout one’s creative life" and gave a "B+" grade. A New York Times reviewer concluded that the film "neither pleases the eye nor stimulates the mind. At one point Mr. Swanberg’s character announces that he couldn’t care less about getting good reviews. Whew, I feel so much better."
