= Caitlin Plays Herself =

- Directed by: Joe Swanberg
- Written by: Caitlin Stainken; Joe Swanberg
- Produced by: Joe Swanberg
- Starring: Caitlin Stainken; Joe Swanberg
- Cinematography: Adam Wingard; Joe Swanberg
- Edited by: Joe Swanberg
- Music by: Keith Ruggiero
- Production company: Swanberry Productions
- Release date: July 18, 2011 (NHFF)
- Running time: 69 minutes
- Country: United States
- Language: English

Caitlin Plays Herself is a 2011 American drama film directed and produced by Joe Swanberg, written by Caitlin Stainken and Swanberg, and starring Stainken and Swanberg. Swanberg and Stainken, a performance artist with the Neo-Futurists, play fictionalized versions of themselves.

== Plot ==
Caitlin, a socially-conscious performance artist, encounters difficulties when her boyfriend, Joe, objects to the nudity in her art.

== Cast ==
- Caitlin Stainken as Caitlin
- Joe Swanberg as Joe
- Frank V. Ross as Frank
- Spencer Parsons as Spencer
- Megan Mercier as Megan
- Kurt Chiang as Kurt
- Tim Reid as Tim
- Adam Wingard

== Release ==
Caitlin Plays Herself premiered at the New Horizons Film Festival in Wrocław, Poland, on July 18, 2011. Its North American premiere was in Brooklyn, New York, on December 2, 2011.

== Reception ==
Rotten Tomatoes has cataloged three negative reviews and one positive. Ronnie Scheib of Variety called it "an American Vivre sa vie without the passion, drama or gorgeous imagery". Paul Brunick of The New York Times wrote that Swanberg's biggest talent is his ability to get actresses to strip naked. Nick Pinkerton of The Village Voice wrote, "It is possible that one of Swanberg’s movies is not a complete waste of time, but Caitlin Plays Herself, written in collaboration with its starlet, Caitlin Stainkin, is not the one." Jaime N. Christley of Slant Magazine rated it 3/4 stars and compared it to Tsai Ming-liang's What Time Is It There?.
