= Hannah Takes the Stairs =

- Directed by: Joe Swanberg
- Written by: Joe Swanberg; Greta Gerwig; Kent Osborne
- Produced by: Joe Swanberg; Anish Savjani
- Starring: Greta Gerwig; Kent Osborne; Andrew Bujalski; Ry Russo-Young; Mark Duplass
- Cinematography: Joe Swanberg
- Edited by: Joe Swanberg
- Music by: Kevin Bewersdorf
- Distributed by: IFC Films
- Release dates: March 11, 2007 (South by Southwest); August 22, 2007
- Running time: 83 minutes
- Country: United States
- Language: English
- Budget: $60,000

Hannah Takes the Stairs is a 2007 American independent mumblecore film by Joe Swanberg. It has been described "as the defining movie of the low-budget, dialogue-driven 'mumblecore' movement."

== Plot ==
Hannah is a recent college graduate living in Chicago who works as an intern at a production office during the summer. She finds herself torn between three different men: her boyfriend Mike, and Matt and Paul, two screenwriters she works with. While coasting from relationship to relationship, Hannah attempts to find a direction for her life.

== Cast ==
- Greta Gerwig as Hannah
- Kent Osborne as Matt
- Andrew Bujalski as Paul
- Ry Russo-Young as Rocco
- Mark Duplass as Mike

== Production ==
The film’s dialogue is largely improvisational. Said Swanberg, "We had the concept of the three guys [Hannah has relationships with] from the very beginning, and the general flow of the movie, so that structure helped. One of the other things that helped us was we started thinking of the movie in a kind of palindrome structure: the beginning and the end would mirror each other, and we’d work inward from that. Those were formal devices that we used, but then all the dialogue was improvised so things that came up naturally just had to be worked in."

The film was shot on digital video with all the participants living together in a Chicago apartment for the duration of filming.

== Release ==
The movie was screened within such festivals as Maryland Film Festival and was released on DVD on April 22, 2008.

== Reception ==
The film received divided reactions from critics. Positive reviews praised the charm of the actors and its experimental approach. Richard Brody of The New Yorker wrote, "Swanberg focuses on a narrow slice of reality, a slender patch of urban-postgrad turf, but he observes it intimately and passionately; few intellectual characters speak as articulately, and elaborate their feelings as plausibly, as his Hannah." Wesley Morris of The Boston Globe said, "It's too tempting to roll your eyes at the film's blissful navel-gazing, but Joe Swanberg has an uncanny talent for making the randomness of downtime feel as alive as it seems generationally true."

Carina Chocano of the Los Angeles Times wrote the film "perfectly encapsulates the slow-motion, frustrated feeling of early adulthood, when longing and inchoate desire easily outnumber actual transformative events and achievements." In The New York Times, Matt Zoller Seitz remarked that the assembly of multiple Swanberg collaborators "[transforms] what might otherwise have been merely a slight but likable comedy into the D.I.Y. equivalent of a rock ’n’ roll supergroup: the mumblecore Asia." He added, "As played by the actress-writer Greta Gerwig, Hannah is neurotic, sweet and mildly sarcastic, in a Gen Y-Diane Keaton sort of way, and her small-stakes odyssey through three relationships is wryly observed."

Conversely, others expressed that the film was "unfocused" and "indulgent". G. Allen Johnson of the San Francisco Chronicle remarked the "film wears out its welcome about halfway through its 83 minutes. I'd say it doesn't go anywhere, but that's the point of these movies." Giving the film a B− grade, Owen Gleiberman of Entertainment Weekly said, "Hannah (Greta Gerwig), the peroxided heroine, leaps from one hookup to the next, but is she searching for passion or just treading water? In the new generational film movement that's been dubbed 'Mumblecore,' it's often hard to tell the difference."

On Rotten Tomatoes, Hannah Takes the Stairs has an approval rating of 59% based on 46 reviews. The site’s critics consensus reads, "Although not terribly focused, Hannah Takes the Stairs contains refreshing realism."

== In popular culture ==
The movie is referenced in the song "Hannah" by indie rock band Freelance Whales.
