= Happy Christmas (film) =

2014 film by Joe Swanberg

- Theatrical release poster
- Directed by: Joe Swanberg
- Written by: Joe Swanberg
- Produced by: Joe Swanberg; Alicia Van Couvering; Peter Gilbert
- Starring: Anna Kendrick; Melanie Lynskey; Mark Webber; Lena Dunham
- Cinematography: Ben Richardson
- Edited by: Joe Swanberg
- Production company: Lucky Coffee Productions
- Distributed by: Magnolia Pictures; Paramount Home Media Distribution
- Release dates: January 19, 2014 (Sundance); July 25, 2014 (United States)
- Running time: 88 minutes
- Country: United States
- Language: English
- Budget: $70,000
- Box office: $30,312

Happy Christmas is a 2014 American independent dramedy film, written, produced and directed by Joe Swanberg. It stars Swanberg, Anna Kendrick, Melanie Lynskey, Mark Webber, and Lena Dunham. Like most of Swanberg's previous features, the film's dialogue was entirely improvised.

Christmas had its world premiere at the Sundance Film Festival—where it was nominated for the Grand Jury Prize in the U.S. Dramatic Competition—on January 19, 2014. It was released on June 26, 2014 through VOD, prior to a limited theatrical run in the United States, which began on July 25, 2014. It received generally positive reviews from critics.

== Plot ==
Irresponsible twenty-something Jenny (Anna Kendrick) arrives in Chicago to stay with her older brother Jeff (Joe Swanberg), a young filmmaker living a peaceful existence with his novelist wife Kelly (Melanie Lynskey) and their two-year-old son. Jenny's arrival shakes up their quiet domesticity as she and Carson (Lena Dunham), her old friend from high school, instigate an evolution in Kelly's personal life and literary career.

== Cast ==
- Anna Kendrick as Jenny
- Melanie Lynskey as Kelly
- Joe Swanberg as Jeff
- Mark Webber as Kevin
- Lena Dunham as Carson

== Release ==
Magnolia Pictures and Paramount Pictures jointly acquired the distribution rights prior to the film's premiere screening, with Magnolia handling U.S. theatrical and VOD distribution and Paramount Home Media Distribution handling U.S. physical home entertainment and all international rights. The film had its world premiere at the Sundance Film Festival on January 19, 2014. It was released on VOD on June 26, 2014, before starting a limited theatrical run on July 25, 2014.

== Reception ==
The film met with positive reviews. On review aggregator Rotten Tomatoes, it holds an approval rating of 75% based on 79 reviews, with an average rating of 6.4/10. The website's critics consensus reads: "Intelligent, well-acted, and satisfyingly low-key, Happy Christmas marks another step in prolific filmmaker Joe Swanberg's creative evolution". On Metacritic, the film has a score of 70 out of 100, based on 28 critics, indicating "generally favorable" reviews.

== See also ==
- List of Christmas films
