= Brooke Bloom =

American actress (active 1999– )

- Occupation: Actress
- Years active: 1999–present

Brooke Bloom is an American actress. She is best known for her starring role as Ronah in the drama film She's Lost Control (2014).

== Career ==
Her first on-screen appearance was a role as Grunge Girl in the episode "Team Play" of CBS's medical drama television series Chicago Hope. In 1999, she appeared in several guest-starring television roles, including Buffy the Vampire Slayer, ER, Felicity, Popular, and Wasteland. She portrayed Teenage Usher in the romantic comedy film Forever Lulu (2000). She has also appeared in films All the Boys Love Mandy Lane (2006), Over Her Dead Body (2008), He's Just Not That Into You (2009), Gabi on the Roof in July (2010), and Ceremony (2010). Furthermore, she portrayed Ronah in the dark drama film She's Lost Control (2014), written and directed by Anja Marquardt. Bloom won the Best Actress award at the 2014 Thessaloniki International Film Festival for her performance in the film. Marc Adams of Screen International said that he found "much to admire in Marquardt’s control and precision as well as a well-sustained lead performance by lead actress Brooke Bloom (...) Brooke Bloom is impressive..."

She portrayed Cynthia Wells in 16 episodes of the police procedural drama television series CSI: Miami. She also had roles in television series Jack & Bobby, Everwood, JAG, In Justice, Good Wife, In Plain Sight, Law & Order, Carpoolers, Person of Interest, and The New Normal. In 2017, she played Rebecca Rogers in the Netflix series Gypsy.

In 2015, Bloom won an Obie Award, presented by the American Theatre Wing, for her performance in the off-Broadway play You Got Older, written by Clare Barron.

== Filmography ==
=== Film ===
Year	Title	Role	Notes
2000	Forever Lulu	Teenage Usher	
2005	The Search for the Golden Bird	Trudy	
2006	All the Boys Love Mandy Lane	Cousin Jen	
2007	Jake's Closet	Jules	
2007	The Brothers Solomon	Grocery Shopper	
2007	Terra	Technician Quinn	Voice
2008	Over Her Dead Body	Margaret's Owner	
2009	He's Just Not That Into You	Paige	
2009	Five Fingers	Girl	Short film
2009	Handjobs for the Future	Sarah	Short film
2010	Gabi on the Roof in July	Madeline	
2010	Ceremony	Margaret Cornish	
2010	Five Days Gone	Camden	
2011	The Key Man	Cheryl	
2011	Perspective	Woman	Short film
2011	Lily Look Here	Lily	Short film
2011	Extremely Loud & Incredibly Close	Astrid Black	
2012	The Normals	Nurse Longley	
2013	Swim Little Fish Swim	Mary	
2014	She's Lost Control	Ronah	
2015	Devil Town	Georgia Newton	
2019	Marriage Story	Mary Ann	
2020	Minyan	Rachel	
2020	The Dark End of the Street	Marney	
2020	The Surrogate	Bridget	
2026	Buddy	Dr. Deborah Burr	

=== Television ===
Year	Title	Role	Notes
1999	Chicago Hope	Grunge Girl	Episode: "Team Play"
1999	Popular	Teen Girl #1	Episode: "The Phantom Menace"
1999	ER	Quinn	Episode: "Truth & Consequences"
1999	Felicity	Brent	Episode: "The Love Bug"
1999	Buffy the Vampire Slayer	Nicole	Episode: "Hush"
1999	Wasteland	N/A	Episode: "Death Becomes Her"
2000	City of Angels	Traci Scott / Kelly	Episodes: "Leg Erie", "A Farewell to Arm"
2001	Any Day Now	N/A	Episode: "What If?"
2003	Cold Case	Tania	Episode: "Our Boy Is Back"
2003	JAG	Petty Officer Third Class Anna Farrier	Episode: "Pulse Rate"
2004	NYPD Blue	Katie Driscoll	Episode: "You Da Bomb"
2004	Jack & Bobby	Bridget	Episode: "Better Days"
2004	Everwood	College Guide	Episode: "Shoot the Moon"
2004–2009	CSI: Miami	Cynthia Wells	16 episodes
2005	Without a Trace	Claire Wallace	Episode: "Safe"
2006	In Justice	Rachel	Episode: "Lovers"
2007	'Til Death	Lucy	Episode: "The Colleague"
2007	Derek and Simon	Jenny	Episode: "Escape!"
2008	Carpoolers	Oola	Episode: "The Handsomest Man"
2008	Law & Order	Molly Lasky	Episode: "Pledge"
2009	Outnumbered	Jenna Embry	
2010	Good Wife	Kate Willoughby	Episode: "Heart"
2010	In Plain Sight	Lois Turner	Episode: "No Clemency for Old Men"
2013	Person of Interest	Emily Morton	Episode: "One Percent"
2013	The New Normal	Debra	Episode: "Blood, Sweat and Fears"
2013–2014	Alpha House	Julie Carrell	18 episodes
2014	Louie	Young Janet	Episode: "Elevator: Part 4"
2015	Law & Order: Special Victims Unit	Dana Farhidi	Episode: "Parents' Nightmare"
2016	BrainDead	Abby Summers	2 episodes
2016	Falling Water	Sabine	9 episodes
2017	Gypsy	Rebecca Rogers	10 episodes
2018	New Amsterdam	Millie	Episode: "Rituals"
2018	Homecoming	Pam	4 episodes
2019–2022	Evil	Emily LeRoux	3 episodes
2020	Bull	Dr. Natalie Reznick	Episode: "The Invisible Woman"
2021	I Know What You Did Last Summer	Clara	Main role
2022	Atlanta	Lisa Mahn	Episode: "The Homeliest Little Horse"
