= Always Shine =

- Theatrical release poster
- Directed by: Sophia Takal
- Written by: Lawrence Michael Levine
- Produced by: Lawrence Michael Levine; Sophia Takal; Pierce Varous
- Starring: Mackenzie Davis; Caitlin FitzGerald; Lawrence Michael Levine; Alexander Koch; Jane Adams
- Cinematography: Mark Schwartzbard
- Edited by: Zach Clark
- Music by: Michael Montes
- Production companies: Little Teeth Pictures; Visit Films; Salem Street Entertainment
- Distributed by: Oscilloscope Laboratories
- Release dates: April 15, 2016 (Tribeca Film Festival); November 25, 2016 (United States)
- Running time: 85 minutes
- Country: United States
- Language: English
- Box office: $16,140

Always Shine is a 2016 American psychological thriller film written by Lawrence Michael Levine and directed by Sophia Takal. The film stars Mackenzie Davis and Caitlin FitzGerald as two friends going for a weekend retreat to Big Sur. It also stars Levine, Alexander Koch and Jane Adams.

The film had its world premiere at the Tribeca Film Festival on April 15, 2016. It had a limited release on November 25, 2016, by Oscilloscope Laboratories.

== Plot ==
Beth (Caitlin FitzGerald) is an actress who is finally beginning to have commercial success appearing in cinematic thrillers and beer commercials which routinely require nudity. She plans a weekend getaway to Big Sur with her best friend Anna (Mackenzie Davis), a struggling actress who works for free in student films.

On the way to Big Sur, Beth is recognized by a fan. Anna soon discovers that Beth has been featured in the "Young Hollywood" edition of a popular magazine. Later that day, the two women have a conversation, during which Anna reveals that she broke up with her boyfriend after getting angry with his boss, and shoving him rather aggressively.

Anna and Beth go to a bar where Anna flirts with an older man who abruptly loses interest when Beth leaves. He then surreptitiously finds Beth alone and asks her out, which Anna sees, and she then cries herself to sleep.

The next day, Anna helps Beth practice for an upcoming audition, when it's made obvious that Anna is the better actress. They then go hiking in the woods, where they encounter Beth's director friend who has wanted to cast Anna in his upcoming short film. Anna is unhappy to learn that Beth was already aware of this offer but neglected to mention it to her. Beth accuses Anna of looking at her with contempt, and the two separate.

While walking back to their rented cottage, Beth is given a ride home by a bartender. After returning to the cottage, Beth calls her boyfriend to tell him about what happened, and that Anna is envious of her, even though Beth acknowledges that Anna is the better actress. She also reveals that she has lied about sending Anna's reel to her agent, and insults Anna. Overhearing the conversation, Anna physically attacks Beth, who flees into the woods with Anna in pursuit, where the altercation continues.

The next day, Anna begins to dress in Beth's clothes and acts demurely, much like Beth. She begins to see Beth (as Anna). Anna (as Beth) returns to the bar where she encounters the bartender, who mistakes her for Beth. The two flirt, and spend the next day together.

The following evening, while the bartender and Anna are having dinner at the home of his friends and later at a club, Anna sees Beth (who is now much like Anna) approaching her and flees into the woods. She has flashbacks of their fight in the woods, where Anna, in a rage, chased Beth, knocked her to the ground and fatally strangled her. The following morning, Anna awakens in the woods. As she returns to the house, Anna sees Beth's boyfriend with police officers wheeling away a body found in the woods.

== Cast ==
- Mackenzie Davis as Anna
- Caitlin FitzGerald as Beth
- Lawrence Michael Levine as Jesse
- Alexander Koch as Matt
- Jane Adams as Summer
- Khan Baykal as Paul
- Colleen Camp as Sandra
- Michael Lowry as Vic
- Marisa Takal as Violet

== Production ==
Sophia Takal revealed in an interview that, from 2011 to 2014, she and Lawrence Michael Levine attempted to get financing, get recognizable actors, and not have herself act in the film. Takal cast Mackenzie Davis and Caitlin FitzGerald since they had a deep understanding of the material.

=== Post-production ===
A Kickstarter campaign was launched to finish the post-production on the film; a goal of $18,000 was set, but the campaign ended up making $22,483.

== Release ==
The film had its world premiere at the Tribeca Film Festival on April 15, 2016. Shortly after, Oscilloscope Laboratories acquired distribution rights to the film. The film went on to screen at the Montclair Film Festival. Venice Film Festival, and the AFI Fest.

The film was released in a limited release on November 25, 2016.

== Reception ==
Always Shine received positive reviews from film critics. It holds a 90% approval rating on review aggregator website Rotten Tomatoes, based on 49 reviews with an average rating of 7.07/10. The website's critical consensus states: "The tense and well-acted Always Shine tells an absorbing story while making a sharp, thought-provoking statement on women's roles in Hollywood." On Metacritic, the film has a weighted average score of 72 out of 100, based on 15 critics, indicating "generally favorable" reviews.

Scott Tobias of Variety gave the film a positive review, writing: "With her confident second feature, director Sophia Takal takes on Tinseltown misogyny and the toxic rivalry between friends, but that’s mere prelude to a gonzo meta-fiction that deconstructs itself nearly to death."
