= The Zone (2011 film) =

- Film poster
- Directed by: Joe Swanberg
- Written by: Joe Swanberg
- Produced by: Joe Swanberg
- Starring: Sophia Takal; Lawrence Michael Levine; Kate Lyn Sheil; Kentucker Audley; Joe Swanberg; Adam Wingard; Kris Swanberg; Dustin Guy Defa
- Cinematography: Joe Swanberg; Adam Wingard
- Edited by: Joe Swanberg
- Production company: Swanberry Productions
- Release date: November 3, 2011 (AFI Fest)
- Running time: 70 minutes
- Country: United States
- Language: English

The Zone is a 2011 American drama film directed, written, produced, and edited by Joe Swanberg. It stars Sophia Takal, Lawrence Michael Levine, Kate Lyn Sheil, Kentucker Audley, Swanberg, Adam Wingard, Kris Swanberg, and Dustin Guy Defa. Swanberg and several of his regulars play themselves in a film within a film.

== Premise ==
Joe Swanberg directs Kentucker, Sophia, Larry, and Kate in a film within a film about a mysterious man who seduces a trio of residents of an apartment. The sexually explicit scenes put a strain on his relationships with the actors, and Swanberg expresses doubt in his ability to fulfill his artistic vision.

== Cast ==
- Sophia Takal as Sophia
- Lawrence Michael Levine as Larry
- Kate Lyn Sheil as Kate
- Kentucker Audley
- Joe Swanberg
- Adam Wingard
- Kris Swanberg
- Dustin Guy Defa

== Release ==
The Zone premiered at the 2011 AFI Fest.

== Reception ==
Andrew Barker of Variety wrote, "But though this film mostly finds the helmer exploring ever-deeper recesses of his own navel, its moments of genuine insight and knack for pulling out the rug upend some of its faults." Justin Lowe of The Hollywood Reporter wrote, "Less is less in another middling mumblecore outing." Richard Brody of The New Yorker called it "a movie of terrible elegiac power".
