= Amy Seimetz =

American actress, writer, director

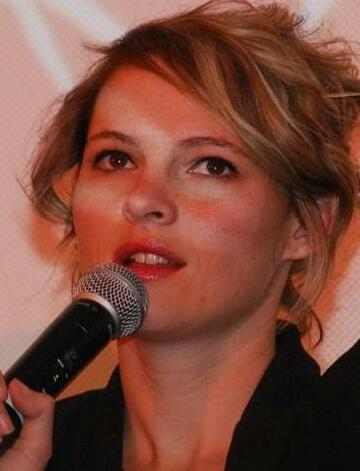
- Seimetz in 2014
- Born: St. Petersburg, Florida, U.S.
- Occupations: Actress; screenwriter; producer; director; editor
- Years active: 2003–present
- Partner: Shane Carruth (2011–2018)

Amy Seimetz is an American actress and filmmaker. She has appeared in several productions, including AMC's The Killing, HBO's Family Tree, and films like Upstream Color, Alien: Covenant, Pet Sematary, and No Sudden Move.

In addition to her acting career, she has directed, written and produced several films, including 2012's Sun Don't Shine and 2020's She Dies Tomorrow. In 2015, she co-wrote, co-directed and executive produced the Starz series The Girlfriend Experience, based on the Steven Soderbergh film of the same name, which was released to positive reviews and acclaim.

== Early life and education ==
Seimetz was born in Florida and mainly grew up in the Tampa-St. Petersburg area. She has Ukrainian ancestry, and also spent part of her childhood in Ukraine. She briefly attended film school at Florida State University before moving to Los Angeles. There, she worked as a nanny, a waitress, and a seamstress while learning filmmaking.

== Career ==
Seimetz began her film career by producing and directing short and independent films, including Barry Jenkins' Medicine for Melancholy, which was nominated for Gotham and Independent Spirit Awards after playing at South By Southwest and the Toronto International Film Festival. She acted in Joe Swanberg's Alexander The Last, which premiered at SXSW. She also worked with Swanberg on Silver Bullets and Autoerotic, continuing with acting roles in Gabi on the Roof in July, Tiny Furniture, Open Five, and The Myth of the American Sleepover.

Seimetz's performance in A Horrible Way to Die won her the Best Actress award at Fantastic Fest. The film premiered at the Toronto International Film Festival to good reviews. She appeared in The Off Hours. About her, the Los Angeles Times wrote: "Every year, the Sundance Film Festival has a semi-official 'it girl' who encapsulates the festival's cocktail of discovery and buzz. But what about someone who embodies the independent film world's sense of community and the pitch-in spirit of collaboration, something like a most valuable player? That prize might well go to Amy Seimetz."

The Hollywood Reporter singled Seimetz out as one of the breakouts of Sundance that year: "As a late-night truck-stop waitress and orphaned lost soul, Seimetz invests Off Hours' dead-end world of tiny tragedies with a hidden, hard-won strength." She appeared in Revenge for Jolly! In 2012, she made her feature directorial debut with the Florida-based thriller Sun Don't Shine, which she also wrote, produced, and co-edited. The film premiered at South By Southwest to rave reviews. Indiewire wrote: "Her terrific directorial debut was a brilliant noir exercise with less mumbling than raw brawls. She pinned me to my Alamo Drafthouse seat and the film kept me there for the next 82 minutes."

Seimetz is the star of Upstream Color and Pit Stop, both of which premiered at the 2013 Sundance Film Festival. In February, she was added as a series regular to AMC's series The Killing. In season 3, she plays Danette Leeds, a "hard-living, financially strapped single mother whose 14-year-old daughter goes missing".

In June 2014, Starz announced that they had ordered a 13-episode anthology series of the film The Girlfriend Experience, co-written, co-directed, and executive produced by Seimetz and Lodge Kerrigan. This came after the film's creator Steven Soderbergh stated: "I think if I were going to run a studio I'd just be gathering the best filmmakers I could find and sort of let them do their thing within certain economic parameters. So I would call Shane Carruth, or Barry Jenkins or Amy Seimetz and I'd bring them in and go, OK, what do you want to do?" The series was later renewed for a second season, and Seimetz continued to produce, write, and direct episodes.

In 2017, Seimetz appeared in Alien: Covenant, directed by Ridley Scott, and also had roles in Lean on Pete, directed by Andrew Haigh, and My Days of Mercy, opposite Elliot Page. In 2018, Seimetz starred opposite Molly Shannon in Wild Nights with Emily directed by Madeleine Olnek. That same year, Seimetz directed two episodes of Atlanta, and had a recurring role on the second season of Get Shorty.

In 2019, Seimetz starred in Pet Sematary, an adaptation of the novel of the same name by Stephen King. She directed She Dies Tomorrow, starring Kate Lyn Sheil and Jane Adams, which was set to have its world premiere at South by Southwest in March 2020, but was cancelled due to the COVID-19 pandemic.

Seimetz co-starred in 2020's The Comey Rule, a miniseries for Showtime, and the thriller film The Secrets We Keep directed by Yuval Alder.

In 2021, Seimetz was announced as the director and an executive producer of The Idol; however, by April 2022 she had left the project amid its creative overhaul, with roughly 80% of the series already filmed. Her material was not used in the final project.

== Personal life ==
In 2016, Seimetz was engaged to filmmaker Shane Carruth, though they had separated by 2019. She later obtained a temporary restraining order against him, alleging years of emotional, mental, and physical abuse, which Carruth denies. In 2020, Seimetz was granted a restraining order against Carruth that expired in August 2025.

== Filmography ==
=== Film ===
Year	Title	Role	Notes
2003	Leaving Baghdad		Short film
2004	The 17th Man	Bookstore Patron	Short film
2004	Measure of Love		Short film
2005	The Unseen Kind-Hearted Beast	Georgette	Short film; director, producer, writer, editor
2005	Black Dragon Canyon	Elizabeth Sterling	
2006	Wristcutters: A Love Story	Nina	
2006	Say It		Short film
2008	Medicine for Melancholy		Associate producer
2008	We Saw Such Things		Director, producer, editor
2009	Alexander the Last	Hellen	
2009	Round Town Girls	Girl #1	Short film; also director
2009	Time's Up	Deborah	Short film
2009	One Night Only	Anna	Short film
2010	Gabi on the Roof in July	Chelsea	
2010	Tiny Furniture	Ashlynn	
2010	Open Five	Lynn	
2010	The Myth of the American Sleepover	Julie Higgins	
2010	Bitter Feast	Katherine Franks	
2010	Incredibly Small	Samantha	
2010	Ruff Love	Amy	Short film
2010	Despedida	Leah	
2010	A Horrible Way to Die	Sarah	
2011	The Jonestown Defense		
2011	The Off Hours	Francine	
2011	Silver Bullets	Charlie	Also producer
2011	The Dish and the Spoon	Emma's Friend	Also producer
2011	No Matter What	Laura	Also associate producer
2011	Small Pond	Katie	
2011	Coffee & Pie		Short film
2011	Autoerotic		
2011	You're Next	Aimee	
2011	Special Things to Do	Sandy	Short film
2012	Be Good	Mary Kutzman	
2012	Revenge for Jolly!	Vicki	
2012	Ghost of Old Highways	The Bridesmaid / The Harlot / The Choirgirl	Short film
2012	The Possession	Beth	
2012	#PostModem		Short film
2012	Sun Don't Shine		Writer, producer, director and editor
2013	When We Lived in Miami		Short film; director & editor
2013	Upstream Color	Kris	
2013	Adventures of Christopher Bosh in the Multiverse	Rollerblading Death Dolphin	
2013	9 Full Moons	Frankie	
2014	The Sacrament	Caroline	
2014	Lucky Them	Sara	
2014	I Believe in Unicorns	Clara	
2014	The Reconstruction of William Zero	Jules	
2014	Tehachapi		Short film
2015	Entertainment	Woman in Bar	
2015	Ma	Misty	
2015	We'll Find Something	Kendra	Short film
2017	Alien: Covenant – Prologue: Last Supper	Maggie Faris	Short film
2017	Alien: Covenant	Maggie Faris	
2017	Lean on Pete	Lynn	
2017	My Days of Mercy	Martha	
2018	Wild Nights with Emily	Mabel	
2019	Pet Sematary	Rachel Creed	
2020	Omniboat: A Fast Boat Fantasia		
2020	She Dies Tomorrow		Director, writer and producer
2020	The Secrets We Keep	Rachel Steinman	
2020	Archenemy	Cleo	
2021	No Sudden Move	Mary Wertz	
2022	The Last Manhunt	Clara True	

=== Television ===
Year	Title	Role	Notes
2013	Family Tree	Ally Keele	3 episodes
2013	Law & Order: Special Victims Unit	Lena Olsen	Episode: "Rapist Anonymous"
2013–2014	The Killing	Danette Leeds	14 episodes
2016	Junior	Ellen	10 episodes
2016	Halt and Catch Fire	Michelle Lattimer	Episode: "NIM"
2016–2017	The Girlfriend Experience	Annabel Reade	5 episodes; also executive producer, writer, director
2016–2017	Stranger Things	Becky Ives	3 episodes
2018	Atlanta		Director, 2 episodes
2018	Get Shorty	Jinny	Season 2, recurring role
2020	The Comey Rule	Trisha Anderson	Miniseries
2021–2024	Sweet Tooth	Birdie	Recurring role (seasons 1–3)
2022	Outer Range		Director, 2 episodes and executive producer
2024	Mr. & Mrs. Smith		Director, 2 episodes
2026	The Testaments	Paula	Upcoming series

== Awards and nominations ==
Year	Award	Category	Nominated work	Result
2010	Gotham Independent Film Award	Best Ensemble Performance	Tiny Furniture	Nominated
2010	SXSW Film Festival	Special Jury Award for Best Ensemble Cast	The Myth of the American Sleepover	Won^{I}
2011	Fantastic Fest	Best Actress	A Horrible Way To Die	Won
2012	SXSW Film Festival	Special Jury Award - Emergent Narrative Woman Director	Sun Don't Shine	Won
2012	Gotham Independent Film Award	Best Film Not Playing At A Theater Near You	Sun Don't Shine	Nominated
2012	RiverRun International Film Festival	Special Jury Prize - Spark Award	Sun Don't Shine	Won^{II}
2012	IndieWire Critics Poll	Best Undistributed Film	Sun Don't Shine	Won
2013	Gotham Independent Film Award	Breakthrough Director	Sun Don't Shine	Nominated
2013	Gotham Independent Film Award	Best Actress	Upstream Color	Nominated

== Notes ==
^I Shared with Claire Sloma, Marlon Morton, Amanda Bauer, Brett Jacobsen, Nikita Ramsey, and Jade Ramsey
^II Shared with Brady Corbet, and David Oyelowo.
