= List of drama films of the 2000s =

This is a list of drama films of the 2000s.

== 2000 ==
- 28 Days
- Adanggaman
- Aberdeen
- Ali Zaoua: Prince of the Streets
- Almost Famous
- Before Night Falls
- Before the Storm
- Blackboards
- Cast Away
- The Circle
- Dancer in the Dark
- The Day I Became a Woman
- Dinosaur
- Faithless
- George Washington
- The Girl
- Hamlet
- In Vanda's Room
- Our Lady of the Assassins
- Our Song
- The Patriot
- Pollock
- Remember the Titans
- Requiem for a Dream
- Road Home
- The Sea
- Traffic
- Under the Sand
- Water Drops on Burning Rocks
- Where the Heart Is
- Yi Yi
- You Can Count on Me

== 2001 ==
- A.I. Artificial Intelligence
- All About Lily Chou-Chou
- A Beautiful Mind
- Dog Days
- Fat Girl
- Ghost World
- In the Bedroom
- In Praise of Love
- The Last Castle
- Kandahar
- Lagaan
- Lantana
- Maangamizi: The Ancient One
- The Man Who Wasn't There
- Millennium Actress
- Millennium Mambo
- Monsoon Wedding
- Monster's Ball
- Mulholland Drive
- Nowhere in Africa
- The Others
- Prancer Returns
- The Son's Room
- Stranger Inside
- Time Out

== 2002 ==
- 8 Mile
- About Schmidt
- AKA
- All or Nothing
- Amen.
- Aro Tolbukhin. En la mente del asesino
- The Best Day of My Life
- Better Luck Tomorrow
- Bloody Sunday
- Catch Me If You Can
- City of God
- Company
- Crossroads
- Distant
- Divine Secrets of the Ya-Ya Sisterhood
- Far from Heaven
- Frida
- Gangs of New York
- The Honeytrap
- The Hours
- The Laramie Project
- Last Call
- Lilya 4-ever
- The Loser Takes It All
- Madame Satã
- The Magdalene Sisters
- The Pianist
- The Quiet American
- Rabbit-Proof Fence
- Road to Perdition
- The Son
- Springtime in a Small Town
- Talk to Her
- Ten
- Unfaithful
- Waiting for Happiness
- Whale Rider

== 2003 ==
- 11:14
- 16 Years of Alcohol
- 21 Grams
- At Five in the Afternoon
- BAADASSSSS!
- Best of Youth
- Big Fish
- Cold Creek Manor
- Cold Mountain
- Crimson Gold
- Le Divorce
- Dogville
- The Five Obstructions
- Garden of Heaven
- House of Sand and Fog
- How to Deal
- Hulk
- The Human Stain
- In America
- The Last Samurai
- The Life of David Gale
- Lost in Translation
- Maria Full of Grace
- Master and Commander: The Far Side of the World
- Memories of Murder
- Mona Lisa Smile
- Monster
- The Motorcycle Diaries
- My Life Without Me
- Mystic River
- Osama
- Party Monster
- Radio
- The Return
- The Room
- Rosenstrasse
- Saraband
- Seabiscuit
- Shattered Glass
- Son frère
- Spring, Summer, Fall, Winter ...And Spring
- Sylvia
- Tears of the Sun
- Thirteen
- Till There Was You

== 2004 ==
- 18-J
- 5x2
- 69
- Anatomy of Hell
- The Aviator
- Bad Education
- Being Julia
- Black Friday
- Brothers
- Closer
- Finding Neverland
- Flying Boys
- Forty Shades of Blue
- Garden State
- Gilles' Wife
- Head-On
- The Holy Girl
- Hotel Rwanda
- House of Flying Daggers
- Innocence
- L'Intrus
- Keane
- Kinsey
- Maria Full of Grace
- Mean Creek
- Million Dollar Baby
- Moolaadé
- My Summer of Love
- Mysterious Skin
- Nine Lives
- Nobody Knows
- The Notebook
- The Passion of the Christ
- Raising Helen
- Ray
- The Sea Inside
- Souli
- Tony Takitani
- Turtles Can Fly
- Vera Drake
- A Very Long Engagement
- Wild Side
- Winter Solstice
- You Got Served

== 2005 ==
- 3 Needles
- A Lot Like Love
- À travers la forêt
- Alice
- Arashi no Yoru ni
- Batman Begins
- Brokeback Mountain
- Broken Flowers
- Capote
- The Child
- Cinderella Man
- The Constant Gardener
- Crash
- The Death of Mr. Lazarescu
- Empire Falls
- Fateless
- Good Night, and Good Luck
- Green Street Hooligans
- Hidden
- Hustle & Flow
- Jarhead
- Junebug
- Lackawanna Blues
- Lady Vengeance
- Manderlay
- Match Point
- Memoirs of a Geisha
- Mother of Mine
- Munich
- Mysterious Skin
- Nana
- Nicky's Game
- North Country
- Oliver Twist
- Paradise Now
- Shopgirl
- Sometimes in April
- Sophie Scholl: The Final Days
- The Squid and the Whale
- Syriana
- Transamerica
- Walk the Line
- The Zero Years

== 2006 ==
- 10 Items or Less
- 12 and Holding
- 50 Ways of Saying Fabulous
- The 9/11 Commission Report
- Ad-lib Night
- After the Wedding
- Akeelah and the Bee
- ATL
- Babel
- Barakat!
- Children of Men
- Climates
- Colossal Youth
- Dreamgirls
- Flags of Our Fathers
- Flight 93 – television film
- Half Nelson
- Home of the Brave
- The Illusionist
- Just Like the Son
- Kidulthood
- Letters from Iwo Jima
- Le Lièvre de Vatanen
- Lights in the Dusk
- Little Children
- Little Miss Sunshine
- Maundy Thursday
- Nana 2
- Pan's Labyrinth
- The Pursuit of Happyness
- The Queen
- Traces of Love
- United 93
- We Are Marshall
- The Wind That Shakes the Barley
- World Trade Center

== 2007 ==
- Alpha Dog
- The Assassination of Jesse James by the Coward Robert Ford
- Atonement
- Black Snake Moan
- Bridge to Terabithia
- Counterparts (Gegenüber)
- The Diving Bell and the Butterfly (Le Scaphandre et le papillon)
- Ezra
- Freedom Writers
- Herb
- The Invisible
- Lonely Hearts
- Miss Potter
- No Smoking
- Reign Over Me
- Spider Lilies
- Spider-Man 3
- Stomp the Yard
- Team Picture
- There Will Be Blood
- Zodiac

== 2008 ==
- 21
- ATL
- Australia
- BA:BO
- Changeling
- The Curious Case of Benjamin Button
- The Dark Knight
- The Duchess
- Doubt
- Frost/Nixon
- Frozen River
- Gran Torino
- His Last Gift
- Keith
- Milk
- The Reader
- Revolutionary Road
- The Secret Life of Bees
- Seven Pounds
- Sleepwalking
- Slumdog Millionaire
- Sunshine Cleaning
- The Visitor
- The Wrestler

== 2009 ==
- 2012
- Antichrist
- Avatar
- The Blind Side
- Bright Star
- Coco Before Chanel
- Crackie
- Crazy Heart
- Dev.D
- An Education
- Gulaal
- Harry Potter and the Half-Blood Prince
- The Hurt Locker
- Invictus
- The Last Station
- The Lovely Bones
- The Messenger
- Monsters
- Moon
- My Sister's Keeper
- Precious
- A Serious Man
- A Single Man
- Up
- Up in the Air
- White Material
- The Young Victoria
