= Passenger Pigeons (film) =

2010 film by Martha Stephens

- Passenger Pigeons film still
- Directed by: Martha Stephens
- Written by: Martha Stephens
- Produced by: Joe Chang
- Starring: Earl Lynn Nelson; Kentucker Audley; Bryan Marshall; Caroline White; Karrie Crouse; Brendan McFadden
- Cinematography: Greg Hudgins
- Edited by: Joe Chang; Martha Stephens
- Production company: Papercookie
- Distributed by: Brink
- Release date: March 13, 2010
- Running time: 107 minutes
- Country: United States
- Language: English

Passenger Pigeons is a 2010 mumblecore drama film written and directed by filmmaker Martha Stephens and her feature film debut.

== Synopsis ==
Four different stories intersect after a miner dies in an accident in an East Kentucky coalmine. The brother of the dead miner, Moses (Bryan Marshall) comes home to visit his family for the first time in years. When the mine closes temporarily, Jesse (Kentucker Audley) spends the time off with his girlfriend Elva (Caroline White). Buck (Earl Lynn Nelson) is an executive with the mining company who comes to town to investigate the mine's safety. Buck is soon to retire and uses the trip to show his replacement Nolan (Brendan McFadden) the ropes. Annie (Karrie Crouse), an activist from Washington D.C., uses the incident as means to drum up support against surface mining.

== Release ==
Passenger Pigeons premiered at the South by Southwest Film Festival on March 13, 2010 and was released on DVD October 15, 2013.
