= Sophia Takal =

American actress, writer and director (born 1986)

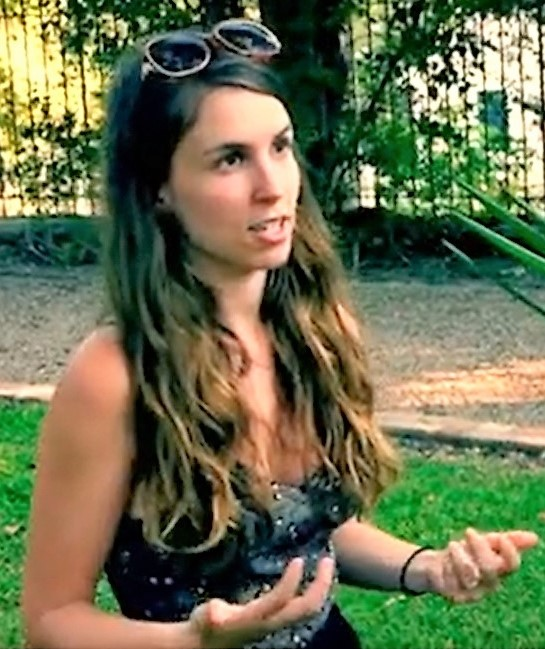
- Takal in 2011
- Born: May 12, 1986 (age 40); Montclair, New Jersey
- Education: Barnard College
- Occupations: Actress; film director; producer; film editor
- Years active: 2009–present
- Spouse: Lawrence Michael Levine

Sophia Takal is an American actress, writer and director, perhaps best known for her work in independent features such as All the Light in the Sky, Supporting Characters and Gabi on the Roof in July. Filmmaker magazine named Takal one of the "25 New Faces of Film" in 2011. She directed and co-wrote the 2019 remake of the 1974 horror film Black Christmas.

== Early life ==
Takal is from Montclair, New Jersey.

== Career ==
Takal has worked on and starred in numerous independent films, some associated with the mumblecore movement.

In March 2011, Takal's first directorial effort, Green, was premiered at the South by Southwest Festival and was positively received, winning Takal the festival's Chicken and Egg Emergent Narrative Woman Director prize. She also wrote the film. In 2015, Takal directed another feature-length film, Always Shine. The film stars Mackenzie Davis, Caitlin FitzGerald, and her husband Lawrence Michael Levine.

Takal and her husband operate a production company called Little Teeth Pictures.

== Personal life ==
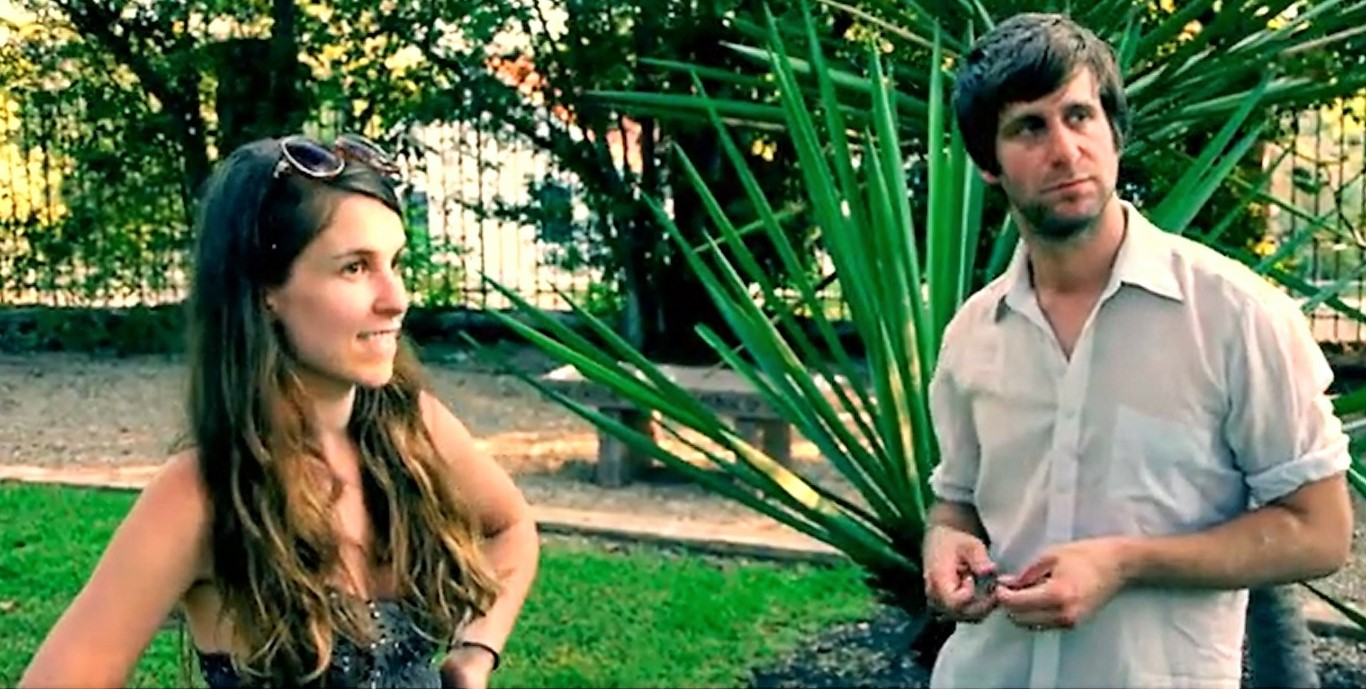
Takal and her husband in 2011.

Takal is married to the filmmaker Lawrence Michael Levine, a frequent collaborator and co-star. She studied film at Vassar before graduating from Barnard College.

== Filmography ==
=== Film ===
Year	Title	Director	Writer	Producer	Notes
2011	Green	Yes	Yes	No	Also editor
2015	Devil Town	Yes	Yes	No	Credited as "Harvey Mitkas"
2016	Always Shine	Yes	No	Yes	
2019	Black Christmas	Yes	Yes	No	
2026	Act One	Yes	Yes	Yes	

Acting roles

Year	Title	Role	Notes
2011	Gabi on the Roof in July	Gabi	Also producer and editor
2011	Green	Robin	
2011	The Zone	Sophia	
2011	The International Sign for Choking	Anna	
2011	Cat Scratch Fever	Anna	
2011	V/H/S	Stephanie	Segment "Second Honeymoon"
2012	Gayby	Honey	
2012	Supporting Characters	Amy	
2012	The Men of Dodge City	Sophia	
2012	All the Light in the Sky	Faye	
2012	Open Five 2		
2013	Molly's Theory of Relativity	Molly	
2013	Detonator	Belle	
2013	Hellaware	Bernadette	
2013	24 Exposures	Callie	
2013	Cheatin'	Ella	
2014	God's Pocket	Temple Graduate	
2014	The Other Men of Dodge City	Sophia	
2014	Wild Canaries	Barri	Also producer
2014	Uncle Kent 2	Public Domain Superhero	
2015	Devil Town	Eve Phillips	

=== Television ===
Director

Year	Title	Episode(s)
2018	Into the Dark	"New Year, New You"
2021	One of Us Is Lying	"One of Us Is Famous"
2021	One of Us Is Lying	"One of Us Is Cracking"
2022	Gossip Girl	"Great Reputations"
2022	Gossip Girl	"One Flew Over the Cucks's Nest"
2023	The Summer I Turned Pretty	"Love Fool"
2023	The Summer I Turned Pretty	"Love Fest"
