= 9 Full Moons =

2013 US romantic drama film by Tomer Almagor

- Official release poster
- Directed by: Tomer Almagor
- Written by: Tomer Almagor
- Produced by: Gabrielle Almagor; Tomer Almagor; Bret Roberts; Joy Saez
- Starring: Amy Seimetz; Bret Roberts; Donal Logue
- Cinematography: Robert Murphy
- Edited by: Tomer Almagor
- Music by: Ted Speaker
- Distributed by: Indie Rights
- Release dates: June 6, 2013 (Seattle International Film Festival); November 7, 2014 (United States)
- Country: United States
- Language: English

9 Full Moons is a 2013 American romantic drama film directed by Tomer Almagor and starring Amy Seimetz, Bret Roberts and Donal Logue. It was released in theaters in 2014.

== Plot ==
Frankie is a hard-drinking woman fresh out of a bad marriage. She wanders East Los Angeles looking for castoff furniture and clothing, which she sometimes sells for spending money. Otherwise, she hangs out with local musicians as an opportunity to meet people.

Lev is a limousine driver who dreams of making it in the music business. He meets Frankie in a dive bar and they hook up, quickly escalating to the point where she moves in with him. Lev also makes a musical connection with Charlie King Nash, a well-known roots-rocker who has hit a creative wall and welcomes the chance to make a new start.

Meantime, Lev and Frankie try to work through the ups and downs of a serious relationship and decide whether each is ready for it.

== Cast ==
- Amy Seimetz as Frankie
- Bret Roberts as Lev
- Donal Logue as Charlie King Nash
- Foster Timms as Spencer Walsh
- Brian McGuire as Ronnie
- Dale Dickey as Billie
- Harry Dean Stanton as Dimitri
- James Duval as Terry
- Joey Capone as Sam

== Critical reception ==
9 Full Moons was originally released June 6, 2013, at the Seattle International Film Festival and made the festival circuit in Los Angeles, Mexico and The Bahamas. It was nominated for Best International Feature at the Raindance Film Festival while Seimetz won the Agave Award for Outstanding Achievement in Acting at the Oaxaca FilmFest. Film Threat called Moons "an uncommon love story ... driven by complex characters" and said Seimetz was perfectly cast.

The film premiered in theaters on November 7, 2014. Its accompanying review in the Los Angeles Times called Moons "a gentle millennial spin on Barfly" that rings true, even though a back-story "proves a waste of Harry Dean Stanton".
