= Devil Town =

- Directed by: Harvey Mitkas
- Written by: Harvey Mitkas
- Produced by: Garth Garber; John Peacock
- Starring: Sophia Takal; Lawrence Michael Levine; Noah Gershman; Lindsay Burdge; Jennifer Kim; Alex Ross Perry
- Cinematography: Nandan Rao
- Edited by: Theodore Collatos
- Production company: Balaboosta Pictures
- Release date: April 16, 2015 (Sarasota Film Festival)
- Running time: 73 minutes
- Country: United States
- Language: English

Devil Town is an American independent mystery film, written and directed by Harvey Mitkas. The film marks Mitkas' directoral debut. It stars Sophia Takal, Lawrence Michael Levine, Noah Gershman, Lindsay Burdge, Jennifer Kim, and Alex Ross Perry. The film had its world premiere on April 16, 2015, at the Sarasota Film Festival.

== Plot ==
A young woman's sister goes missing. To find her missing sister, she sets out on a quest throughout Brooklyn, enlisting a crew of the weirdest people in the city.

== Cast ==
- Sophia Takal as Eve Phillips
- Lawrence Michael Levine as Beau Hawthorne
- Noah Gershman as Tom Hallerman
- Lindsay Burdge as Isabel Phillps
- Jennifer Kim as Collen Conway
- Alex Karpovsky as Terrance Bard
- Alex Ross Perry as Detective Ira Goldberg

== Marketing ==
On April 16, 2015, an official teaser and image for the film was released.

== Release ==
The film had its world premiere at the Sarasota Film Festival on April 16, 2015. and went on to screen at the Brooklyn International Film Festival on June 3, 2015. and the Northside Film Festival on June 9, 2015. The film was released through NoBudge.com, an independent film premiere-streaming website on September 29, 2015.
