= Easy (TV series) =

2016 television series by Joe Swanberg

- Genre: Comedy drama; Mumblecore; Anthology
- Created by: Joe Swanberg
- Written by: Joe Swanberg
- Directed by: Joe Swanberg
- Starring: Malin Åkerman; Jane Adams; Andrew Bachelor; Orlando Bloom; Zazie Beetz; Hannibal Buress; Aya Cash; Raúl Castillo; Michael Chernus; Aislinn Derbez; Kiersey Clemons; Dave Franco; Evan Jonigkeit; Jake Johnson; Marc Maron; Gugu Mbatha-Raw; Jacqueline Toboni; Kate Micucci; Mauricio Ochmann; Emily Ratajkowski; Elizabeth Reaser; Aubrey Plaza; Lawrence Michael Levine; Kate Berlant; Joe Lo Truglio; Michaela Watkins; Judy Greer; Danielle Macdonald; Danny Masterson; Karley Sciortino; Sophia Bush; John Gallagher Jr.; Melanie Lynskey
- Composer: Dan Romer
- Country of origin: United States
- Original languages: English; Spanish
- No. of seasons: 3
- No. of episodes: 25

Production
- Executive producers: Joe Swanberg; Alex Orr; Andy Weil; Kristen Zolner; Jane Wiseman
- Production location: Chicago
- Cinematography: Eon Mora
- Editor: Joe Swanberg
- Running time: 26–51 minutes
- Production company: Sparrow Grass

Original release
- Network: Netflix
- Release: September 22, 2016 – May 10, 2019

Easy is an American comedy-drama television anthology series written, directed, edited and produced by Joe Swanberg. It consists of 25 half-hour episodes. The series is set in Chicago.

The first season was released on Netflix on September 22, 2016. In April 2017, Swanberg revealed the series had been renewed for a second season, which was released on December 1, 2017. In August 2018, the series was renewed for a third and final season that premiered on May 10, 2019.

== Background ==
Easy follows several people living in Chicago as they navigate issues such as love, relationships, and general knowledge. A review described the series as a microscopic portrayal of the different varieties of modern love. It has an episodic anthology format, with standalone episodes that do not relate to previous ones. The series does include recurring narratives, such as the story of the married couple Kyle (Michael Chernus) and Andi (Elizabeth Reaser), introduced in Season 1. The story is revisited in Season 2 and Season 3, with their respective episodes focusing on the development and effects of their decision to enter into an open relationship. The producers created some characters from scratch, but others, such as Odinaka Malachi Ezeokoli, Karley Sciortino, and Jane Adams's characters in Season 2 are based on the actors' real personas, personalities, and/or jobs.

== Cast ==
- Jane Adams as Annabelle Jones (season 1–3)
- Zazie Beetz as Noelle (season 1–3)
- Aya Cash as Sherri (season 1–3)
- Michael Chernus as Kyle (season 1–3)
- Kiersey Clemons as Chase (season 1–3)
- Dave Franco as Jeff (season 1–3)
- Evan Jonigkeit as Matt (season 1–3)
- Marc Maron as Jacob Malco (season 1–3)
- Gugu Mbatha-Raw as Sophie (season 1-3)
- Kate Micucci as Annie (season 1–3)
- Elizabeth Reaser as Andi (season 1–3)
- Jaz Sinclair as Amber (season 1–3)
- Jacqueline Toboni as Jo (season 1–3)

=== Guest ===
==== Introduced in Season 1 ====
- Suzanne Adent as Penny (season 1-3)
- Arthur Agee as himself
- Malin Åkerman as Lucy
- Andrew Bachelor as Andrew
- Orlando Bloom as Tom
- Hannibal Buress as Jason
- Raúl Castillo as Bernie
- Aislinn Derbez as Gabi (season 1-2)
- Peter Gwinn as Andy (season 1-3)
- Noah Hopkins as Russ (season 1-3)
- Jake Johnson as Andrew (season 1, 3)
- Mauricio Ochmann as Martin
- Emily Ratajkowski as Allison Lizowska
- Rebecca Spence as Cheryl (season 1, 3)
- Lucas Von Kampen as Allen (season 1-3)
- Jake Weber as Wally

==== Introduced in Season 2 ====
- Kate Berlant as Lauren
- Lindsay Burdge as Amy (season 2-3)
- Craig Butta as Frank Bruno
- Dustin Guy Defa as Couples’ Therapist (season 2-3)
- Odinaka Malachi Ezeokoli as himself (season 2-3)
- Megan Ferguson as Samantha (season 2-3)
- Judy Greer as Gretchen
- Tim Kazurinsky as Father Timothy
- Jennifer Kim as Annie
- Lawrence Michael Levine as Harrison
- Joe Lo Truglio as Mike
- Danielle Macdonald as Grace (season 2-3)
- Danny Masterson as Annie's boyfriend
- Aubrey Plaza as Lindsay
- Parker Sawyers as Jason
- Karley Sciortino as Sally
- Kate Lyn Sheil as Annie's roommate (season 2-3)
- Timothy Simons as Chris Whitman
- Michaela Watkins as Karen Treska

==== Introduced in Season 3 ====
- Sophia Bush as Alexandria
- Cliff Chamberlain as Ryan
- Marika Engelhardt as Det. Lindsay
- Nicky Excitement as Hugh
- Louis Frazier as Kool
- John Gallagher Jr. as Lucas
- Lydia House as Lydia
- Melanie Lynskey as Beth
- Perry Myers as Perry
- Kali Skrap as Skrap
- Anthony Smith as Anthony

== Production ==
In March 2016, it was announced Netflix had ordered a season of eight episodes, with Joe Swanberg writing and directing the series, with Michael Chernus, Marc Maron, Elizabeth Reaser, Gugu Mbatha-Raw, Jake Johnson, Aya Cash, Dave Franco, Jane Adams, Hannibal Buress, Kiersey Clemons, Orlando Bloom, and Malin Åkerman starring.

== Episodes ==
Some characters appear in one or more episodes as the protagonist, and in other episodes as background characters.

Season	Episodes	Originally released
1	8	September 22, 2016
2	8	December 1, 2017
3	9	May 10, 2019

=== Season 1 (2016) ===
No. overall	No. in season	Title	Directed by	Written by	Original release date
1	1	"The F**king Study"	Joe Swanberg	Joe Swanberg	September 22, 2016
Andi and Kyle have been married 15 years where the passion between them has long run out. Kyle is a stay-at-home dad, raising their two children with Andi being the one working full-time. At a social gathering, a friend tells Andi and Kyle that the sex life of a couple can be heightened if both play more gender-specific roles in their lives. With Hallowe'en approaching, Andi decides to experiment by buying appropriate gender-traditional costumes, testing this hypothesis. Cast: Michael Chernus as Kyle and Elizabeth Reaser as Andi
2	2	"Vegan Cinderella"	Joe Swanberg	Joe Swanberg	September 22, 2016
Chase and Jo hook up after meeting at a concert and start dating. Jo's activism about conscious consumption, veganism, and environmental impact pressures Chase into doing things she doesn't really want to, like going vegan or riding a bicycle. This leads to deception and lies as Chase seems to want to live up to Jo's standards of responsible living. Cast: Kiersey Clemons as Chase, Jacqueline Toboni as Jo, Jaz Sinclair as Amber
3	3	"Brewery Brothers"	Joe Swanberg	Joe Swanberg	September 22, 2016
Jeff works at a coffee shop, a very different environment from the corporate one of his brother Matt. But they find a way to work together - risking the ire of Matt's wife Sherri - when an impulsive decision leads Matt to start an illegal garage brewery with Jeff. Cast: Evan Jonigkeit as Matt, Aya Cash as Sherri, Dave Franco as Jeff, Zazie Beetz as Noelle
4	4	"Controlada"	Joe Swanberg	Joe Swanberg	September 22, 2016
Tensions brew between Gabi and Bernie, a couple trying to conceive, when their hard-partying friend Martin visits and decides to crash on their couch. Cast: Aislinn Derbez as Gabi, Raúl Castillo as Bernie, Mauricio Ochmann as Martin
5	5	"Art and Life"	Joe Swanberg	Joe Swanberg	September 22, 2016
Graphic novelist Jacob Malco is feeling increasingly irrelevant, leading him to spin a poorly attended book signing into something more intimate. This in turn leads to a viral moment in which he embarrasses himself, with perhaps a surprising outcome whereby life and art are both enhanced. Cast: Marc Maron as Jacob Malco, Emily Ratajkowski as Allison Lizowska, Jane Adams as Annabelle Jones
6	6	"Utopia"	Joe Swanberg	Joe Swanberg	September 22, 2016
Tom and Lucy are married with a baby. Annie, an entertainer who sings for mother-and-baby groups, introduces Lucy to Tinder over coffee. Tom and Lucy decide to test the waters for a threesome, but choose Annie for safety. Constantly interrupted by the baby awakening, they are nevertheless happy with the outcome. Cast: Orlando Bloom as Tom, Malin Åkerman as Lucy, Kate Micucci as Annie
7	7	"Chemistry Read"	Joe Swanberg	Joe Swanberg	September 22, 2016
Actors Sophie and Annabelle are in the same theater production. Sophie pursues a big west coast opportunity while Annabelle thinks of her fading career as she gets older. Annabelle hooks up with Wally, an old flame, while Sophie nervously goes through with her auditions, aware of who she might have to leave behind. Cast: Gugu Mbatha-Raw as Sophie, Jane Adams as Annabelle Jones, Jake Johnson as Drew, Michael Chernus as Kyle, Jake Weber as Wally
8	8	"Hop Dreams"	Joe Swanberg	Joe Swanberg	September 22, 2016
Matt and Jeff are earning reputation and big bucks from their garage operation, when reporter Jason is assigned to interview both for a story. The interviews highlight a fissure between Matt, who wants to expand to a bigger unit, and Jeff who prefers the smaller operation so he has freedom to experiment. When Jeff's girlfriend Noelle unexpectedly becomes pregnant, Jeff half-heartedly decides to go along with Matt and expand. Cast: Hannibal Buress as Jason, Dave Franco as Jeff, Zazie Beetz as Noelle, Aya Cash as Sherri, Evan Jonigkeit as Matt

=== Season 2 (2017) ===
No. overall	No. in season	Title	Directed by	Written by	Original release date
9	1	"Package Thief"	Joe Swanberg	Joe Swanberg	December 1, 2017
Neighbors in an affluent community take matters into their own hands when they spy a baseball-capped thief stealing packages off their doorsteps. Cast: Jennifer Kim as Annie, Lawrence Michael Levine as Harrison, Joe Lo Truglio as Mike, Aubrey Plaza as Lindsay, Timothy Simons as Whitman.
10	2	"Open Marriage"	Joe Swanberg	Joe Swanberg	December 1, 2017
After talking it through in therapy, married parents Andi and Kyle explore an open relationship. On night one, they each test the waters. Cast: Lindsay Burdge as Amy, Michael Chernus as Kyle, Elizabeth Reaser as Andi, Parker Sawyers as Jason.
11	3	"Side Hustle"	Joe Swanberg	Joe Swanberg	December 1, 2017
A stand-up comedian who drives an uber and a sex-positive feminist writer who moonlights as a call girl hustle to make a living while chasing their creative dreams. Cast: Karley Sciortino as Sally, Odinaka Malachi Ezeokoli as Od, Jane Adams as Annabelle Jones.
12	4	"Spent Grain"	Joe Swanberg	Joe Swanberg	December 1, 2017
The brewery brothers, now dads, grapple with brisk business which nonetheless leaves Jeff with little opportunity to experiment and Matt with the routine task of getting their beer bought by bar owners. Their wives Sherri and Noelle launch their own business selling organic dog treats and quickly earn a supermarket deal which Noelle initially conceals from Jeff. When Jeff finds out, the creative tension with Matt leads him to quit and stay at home with his young daughter while once again running a brewery out of his garage so Noelle can work full-time. Cast: Zazie Beetz as Noelle, Aya Cash as Sherri, Dave Franco as Jeff, Evan Jonigkeit as Matt.
13	5	"Conjugality"	Joe Swanberg	Joe Swanberg	December 1, 2017
Jacob tries to reconnect with his estranged ex-wife when he releases a new edition of his first graphic novel, which chronicled his infidelity. Cast: Jane Adams as Annabelle Jones, Marc Maron as Jacob Malco, Michaela Watkins as Karen Treska, Kate Berlant as Lauren.
14	6	"Prodigal Daughter"	Joe Swanberg	Joe Swanberg	December 1, 2017
A teenager turns the tables on her wealthy parents when they force her to go to church every week as punishment. Cast: Danielle Macdonald as Grace, Judy Greer as Gretchen, Peter Gwinn as Andy, Jacqueline Toboni as Jo, Tim Kazurinsky as Father Timothy.
15	7	"Lady Cha Cha"	Joe Swanberg	Joe Swanberg	December 1, 2017
Chase and Jo clash over double standards about art, sex and feminism. Chase is a budding burlesque dancer despite Jo's disapproval, while Jo helps produce feminist performance art featuring nudity. Cast: Kiersey Clemons as Chase, Jaz Sinclair as Amber, Jacqueline Toboni as Jo.
16	8	"Baby Steps"	Joe Swanberg	Joe Swanberg	December 1, 2017
Burned by a recent breakup, Annie finds joy baby-sitting for a friend in need, and contemplates a new kind of domestic arrangement. Cast: Megan Ferguson as Samantha, Kate Micucci as Annie.

=== Season 3 (2019) ===
No. overall	No. in season	Title	Directed by	Written by	Original release date
17	1	"Swipe Right"	Joe Swanberg	Joe Swanberg	May 10, 2019
Andi and Kyle have an open marriage, but Kyle's the only one seeing other people — until Andi runs into an old friend at a dinner party. Cast: Lindsay Burdge as Amy, Cliff Chamberlain as Ryan, Michael Chernus as Kyle, Elizabeth Reaser as Andi.
18	2	"Private Eyes"	Joe Swanberg	Joe Swanberg	May 10, 2019
Hugh, a low-level employee at the U-Spy Store, jumps at the chance to go undercover at a BDSM party, dutifully researching his role as a submissive. Cast: Nicky Excitement as Hugh, Perry Myers as Detective Perry, Marika Engelhardt as Detective Lindsay, Molly Hewitt as Mistress Amelia.
19	3	"Spontaneous Combustion"	Joe Swanberg	Joe Swanberg	May 10, 2019
When Chase and Jo's lease is up, Chase admits she's not ready to be in a committed relationship. But making a clean break isn't easy. Cast: Sophia Bush as Alexandria, Kiersey Clemons as Chase, Jaz Sinclair as Amber, Jacqueline Toboni as Jo.
20	4	"Yes"	Joe Swanberg	Joe Swanberg	May 10, 2019
Tired of being single Annie decides to say yes to everyone who asks her out for 30 days — and finds herself battling dating fatigue. Cast: Kate Micucci as Annie, John Gallagher, Jr as Lucas, Megan Ferguson as Samantha.
21	5	"Swipe Left"	Joe Swanberg	Joe Swanberg	May 10, 2019
Kyle feels threatened by Andi's relationship with Ryan. But a change of heart forces both Kyle and Andi to take a hard look at their feelings and evaluate the success of their polyamorous relationship experiment. Cast: Lindsay Burdge as Amy, Cliff Chamberlain as Ryan, Michael Chernus as Kyle, Elizabeth Reaser as Andi.
22	6	"Blank Pages"	Joe Swanberg	Joe Swanberg	May 10, 2019
Self-absorbed professor Jacob learns that a former student is penning an unflattering graphic novel about their relationship. Cast: Jane Adams as Annabelle Jones, Marc Maron as Jacob Malco, Melanie Lynskey as Beth.
23	7	"Number One Seller"	Joe Swanberg	Joe Swanberg	May 10, 2019
To avoid giving up a percentage of his sales, street vendor Skrap splits off from his boss and recruits his friend Kool to mount a rival operation. Cast: Kali Skrap as Skrap, Anthony Smith as Ant, Louis Frazier (aka Kool), as Kool.
24	8	"Low Rolling Boil"	Joe Swanberg	Joe Swanberg	May 10, 2019
As Jeff's neighborhood gentrifies, the neighbors begin to object to Jeff's garage brewery, leading him to be arrested twice. Jeff's estranged brother Matt reaches out and offers him a job at his rival brewery, seeking to break the ice after their father's death. Jeff realizes the garage operation is unworkable and commits to taking care of his young daughter, giving Noelle a much needed boost of support as she prepares to sign a lease on a commercial kitchen with Sherri. Jeff reconnects with Matt and gives his offer of working part-time serious thought, reuniting the families over beer as the episode ends. Cast: Zazie Beetz as Noelle, Aya Cash as Sherri, Dave Franco as Jeff, Evan Jonigkeit as Matt.
25	9	"She's Back"	Joe Swanberg	Joe Swanberg	May 10, 2019
When Sophie learns that her TV show was cancelled, she has second thoughts about the ex she left behind to pursue her acting dreams. Cast: Gugu Mbatha-Raw as Sophie, Jake Johnson as Drew.

== Reception ==
The first season of Easy received positive reviews from film critics. It holds an 85% approval rating on review aggregation website Rotten Tomatoes, based on 26 reviews, with an average rating of 7.53/10. On Metacritic, the season holds a rating of 72 out of 100, based on reviews from 10 critics, indicating "generally favorable reviews".

The show's second season received similar reviews. On Rotten Tomatoes, it holds an 86% approval rating based on 14 critical reviews, with an average rating of 9/10.
