= Nancy, Please =

- Theatrical release poster
- Directed by: Andrew Semans
- Written by: Will Heinrich; Andrew Semans
- Produced by: Dave Saltzman; Vinay Singh
- Starring: Will Rogers; Eléonore Hendricks; Rebecca Lawrence Levy; Santino Fontana
- Cinematography: Eric Lin
- Edited by: Ron Dulin
- Music by: Christopher White
- Production company: Small Coup Films
- Distributed by: Factory 25
- Release date: April 21, 2012 (United States)
- Running time: 84 minutes
- Country: United States
- Language: English

Nancy, Please is a 2012 American drama film directed by Andrew Semans. It stars Will Rogers as Paul, a PhD candidate struggling to complete his thesis who gets into a seemingly insignificant conflict with his former roommate, Nancy (Eléonore Hendricks), over a missing book. Paul's partner, Jen (Rebecca Lawrence Levy), and his friend, Charlie (Santino Fontana), unsuccessfully try to help resolve the conflict.

== Critical response ==
Nancy, Please has received favorable reviews from film critics. Rotten Tomatoes reports 100% positive reviews and an average rating of 7.8/10 from 8 critics, while Metacritic reports an average score of 76/100 from 5 critics. Jeannette Catsoulis in The New York Times appreciates the "tone that’s precisely balanced between terror and farce". In The Hollywood Reporter, Frank Scheck writes that "Andrew Semans presents an engrossing psychological thriller for his feature debut."
