= Eleonore Hendricks =

American actress

Eléonore Hendricks
- Born: 1983 (age 42–43); New York City
- Occupations: Actress, photographer, casting director

Eléonore Hendricks (born 1983) is an American actress, photographer and casting director based out of New York City. She has appeared in films such as A Guide to Recognizing Your Saints, as well as films by the Safdie brothers.

After graduating from Smith College, Hendricks served as a casting director. As an actress, she starred in Nancy, Please in 2012. In 2015, she played a title role in Come Down Molly.

== Filmography ==
Feature films

- A Guide to Recognizing Your Saints (2006)
- The House Is Burning (2006)
- The Pleasure of Being Robbed (2008)
- Daddy Longlegs (2009)
- The Dish & the Spoon (2011)
- Bad Fever (2011)
- Nancy, Please (2012)
- Wild Canaries (2014)
- Heaven Knows What (2014)
- Boulevard (2014)
- Stinking Heaven (2015)
- Songs My Brothers Taught Me (2015)
- Come Down Molly (2015)
- To the Night (2018)
- When You Finish Saving the World (2022)
- Bunny (2025)
- Night Nurse (2026)
