= She Dies Tomorrow =

2020 American arthouse film

- Theatrical release poster
- Directed by: Amy Seimetz
- Written by: Amy Seimetz
- Produced by: Amy Seimetz; David Lawson; Aaron Moorhead; Justin Benson
- Starring: Kate Lyn Sheil; Jane Adams; Kentucker Audley; Katie Aselton; Chris Messina; Tunde Adebimpe; Jennifer Kim; Olivia Taylor Dudley; Michelle Rodriguez; Josh Lucas; Adam Wingard
- Cinematography: Jay Keitel
- Edited by: Kate Brokaw
- Music by: Mondo Boys
- Production company: Rustic Films
- Distributed by: Neon
- Release date: July 31, 2020 (United States)
- Running time: 84 minutes
- Country: United States
- Language: English
- Box office: $398,663

She Dies Tomorrow is a 2020 American psychological thriller horror film written, directed, and produced by Amy Seimetz. It stars Kate Lyn Sheil, Jane Adams, Kentucker Audley, Katie Aselton, Chris Messina, Tunde Adebimpe, Jennifer Kim, Olivia Taylor Dudley, Michelle Rodriguez, Josh Lucas and Adam Wingard.

The film was released in the United States on July 31, 2020, by Neon, to positive reviews.

== Plot ==
Amy is a young woman who has recently purchased a house, and is congratulated over the phone by her friend Jane. Amy seems distant, confusing Jane, who mentions that she cannot come over due to having to stop by her sister-in-law's birthday party, but agrees to visit anyway. Amy searches for urns on her computer, before changing her search to leather jackets. When Jane visits, Amy reveals to her that she knows she is going to die the next day, which Jane initially writes off as a result of Amy consuming alcohol, revealing that Amy is a former alcoholic. Amy repeatedly says that she wants to be turned into a leather jacket after she dies, so she could be made into something of use. Jane leaves, telling her she will call the next day. Jane returns to her house to continue studying samples under a microscope, but suddenly becomes paranoid and rushes to Amy's house, leaving several voice messages but being unable to contact her. She then leaves to go to her sister-in-law's birthday party.

At the party, Jane appears disheveled and in her pajamas, confusing the other guests and disturbing them by saying she, too, is going to die tomorrow. This upsets Susan, Jane's sister-in-law, while Jane's brother, Jason, tries to defuse the tension. Tilly, a party guest, remarks to her boyfriend, Brian, that she thought Jane was crazy as they are in the car preparing to leave. However, Brian says he thought she was correct, revealing that the fear of dying Amy and Jane has is contagious, and both of them are now infected. Jason and Susan are then infected while cleaning after the party, as they end up passing the fear onto their daughter. At a hospital, Brian kills his father by interrupting his life support systems, upon which Tilly reveals she was simply waiting for the death in order to break up with him. Jane goes to a doctor, who initially wants to refer her to a psychologist.

Amy goes for a ride in a dune buggy with a driver, during which she recalls a time that she and her boyfriend Craig went to Craig's brother's vacation house for a weekend. During the weekend, the two order pizza, and it is implied that Craig became infected by the pizza delivery driver. After the ride, Amy passes the fear onto the dune buggy driver, before the two briefly attempt to make out, before giving up. Back at the doctor's office, Jane passes the fear onto the doctor, who has a breakdown before leaving to be with his wife. Jane returns home and begins communicating with the bacteria she sees under the microscope in an attempt to calm herself, before seeing something enter her home that she asks "is this how it ends?"

Amy returns to the vacation home to find that Craig has died by suicide. The next morning, Jason and Susan discuss what they believe will be their final day, and agree to not wake their daughter so she can pass away in her sleep. Jane then wanders into the home of two young women, Sky and Erin, who seem unfazed by Jane's bloodied appearance, before revealing they both have the sickness as well. Jane asks to use the pool, and begins swimming as her blood soaks the water. Sky and Erin talk casually about what they will miss when they are dead. Amy then visits a leather shop, and begins asking questions about custom work, eventually asking about what they could do with "a mammal". Amy begins tearing up as the employee describes the process, before jolting awake, finding herself lying on some rocks. She begins whispering to herself, going between "it's okay" and "I'm not okay", and gently humming.

== Cast ==
- Kate Lyn Sheil as Amy
- Jane Adams as Jane
- Kentucker Audley as Craig
- Chris Messina as Jason
- Katie Aselton as Susan
- Tunde Adebimpe as Brian
- Jennifer Kim as Tilly
- Olivia Taylor Dudley as Erin
- Michelle Rodriguez as Sky
- Josh Lucas as Doc
- Adam Wingard as Dune Buggy Man
- James Benning as Leatherman

== Production ==
Seimetz financed the film by using her salary from Pet Sematary. She came up with the idea for the script after noticing how people reacted to her sharing her stories of anxiety attacks.

== Release ==
The film was originally set to have its world premiere at South by Southwest on March 14, 2020. However, the festival was cancelled due to the COVID-19 pandemic. Neon acquired distribution rights to the film in March 2020. She Dies Tomorrow was released in drive-in theaters on July 31, 2020, followed by video on demand on August 7, 2020.

== Reception ==
Review aggregator website Rotten Tomatoes collected 190 critic reviews and identified 84% of them as positive, with an average rating of 7.3/10. Critics' consensus on the website is: "Formally provocative and emotionally raw, She Dies Tomorrow confirms writer-director Amy Seimetz as a filmmaker with a unique – and timely – vision." Metacritic assessed the film a weighted average rating of 80 out of 100, based on 37 critics, indicating "generally favorable reviews".
