= Wild Canaries =

- Theatrical release poster
- Directed by: Lawrence Michael Levine
- Written by: Lawrence Michael Levine
- Produced by: Lawrence Michael Levine; Sophia Takal; Kim Sherman; E. McCabe Walsh; Patrick M. Wood
- Starring: Sophia Takal; Lawrence Michael Levine; Alia Shawkat; Jason Ritter; Annie Parisse
- Cinematography: Mark Schwartzbard
- Edited by: Sofi Marshall
- Music by: Michael Montes
- Production company: Little Teeth Pictures
- Distributed by: Sundance Selects
- Release dates: March 8, 2014 (SXSW); February 25, 2015 (United States)
- Running time: 98 minutes
- Country: United States
- Language: English
- Budget: $300,000
- Box office: $19,777

Wild Canaries is an American black comedy mystery film directed, produced and written by Lawrence Michael Levine and starring Levine, Sophia Takal, Alia Shawkat, Annie Parisse, Jason Ritter and Kevin Corrigan. The film had its world premiere premiered at the South by Southwest Film Festival on March 8, 2014. The film was released in a limited release and through video on demand on February 25, 2015, courtesy of Sundance Selects.

== Synopsis ==
Barri (Sophia Takal) and Noah (Lawrence Michael Levine) are a couple who suspect the mysterious death of their neighbor Sylvia (Marylouise Burke). With their friend Jean (Alia Shawkat), they investigate the crime and discover secrets in the apartment. Anthony (Kevin Corrigan) becomes the prime suspect.

== Cast ==
- Sophia Takal as Barri
- Lawrence Michael Levine as Noah
- Alia Shawkat as Jean
- Jason Ritter as Damien Anders
- Annie Parisse as Eleanor
- Kevin Corrigan as Anthony
- Marylouise Burke as Sylvia
- Lindsay Burdge as Annabell
- Eleonore Hendricks as Molly
- Jennifer Kim as Lori
- Kent Osborne as Calvin
- Bob Byington as Disgruntled Filmmaker

== Release ==
The film premiered at the South by Southwest Film Festival on March 8, 2014. On December 23, 2014, it was announced that Sundance Selects had acquired distribution rights for the film with a planned 2015 release. The film was released in a limited release and on video on demand beginning on February 25, 2015. The film went on to premiere at the Sarasota Film Festival on April 10, 2014, and various other film festivals throughout 2014.

== Critical reception ==
Wild Canaries received positive reviews from film critics. It holds an 85% approval rating on review aggregator website Rotten Tomatoes, based on 26 reviews, with an average rating of 7.1/10. On Metacritic, the film holds a rating of 67 out of 100, based on 13 critics, indicating "generally favorable reviews".

Justin Chang of Variety gave the film a positive review writing: "Far too eventful, plot-driven and frankly fun to be classified as mumblecore, 'Canaries' can only build on Levine’s audience; it could catch on with savvy indie filmgoers, particularly those with an affection for the genre being saluted." Eric Kohn of Indiewire.com gave the film a positive review giving the film a B writing :"Levine's bubbly murder mystery, in which the ultimate solution to the whodunit scenario matters less than the wily energy its characters bring to uncovering every piece of the puzzle."

== Controversy ==
A theater in Sandpoint, Idaho refused to screen the film, due to the film not receiving an MPAA rating; the owner stated that the film "contained subject matter not in keeping with the standards of the Panida and I have chosen to cancel screenings for Friday and Saturday matinee. I apologize for any inconvenience." The owner also claimed IFC Films did not make them “aware” of the content. However, cast member Sophia Takal took to her official Facebook account stating: "Wild Canaries has no nudity, no sex scenes. It has two scenes where a guy is smoking marijuana. It has two lesbian main characters. It's hard not to jump to the conclusion that that's why they pulled it."
