= Kate Lyn Sheil =

American actress (born 1985)

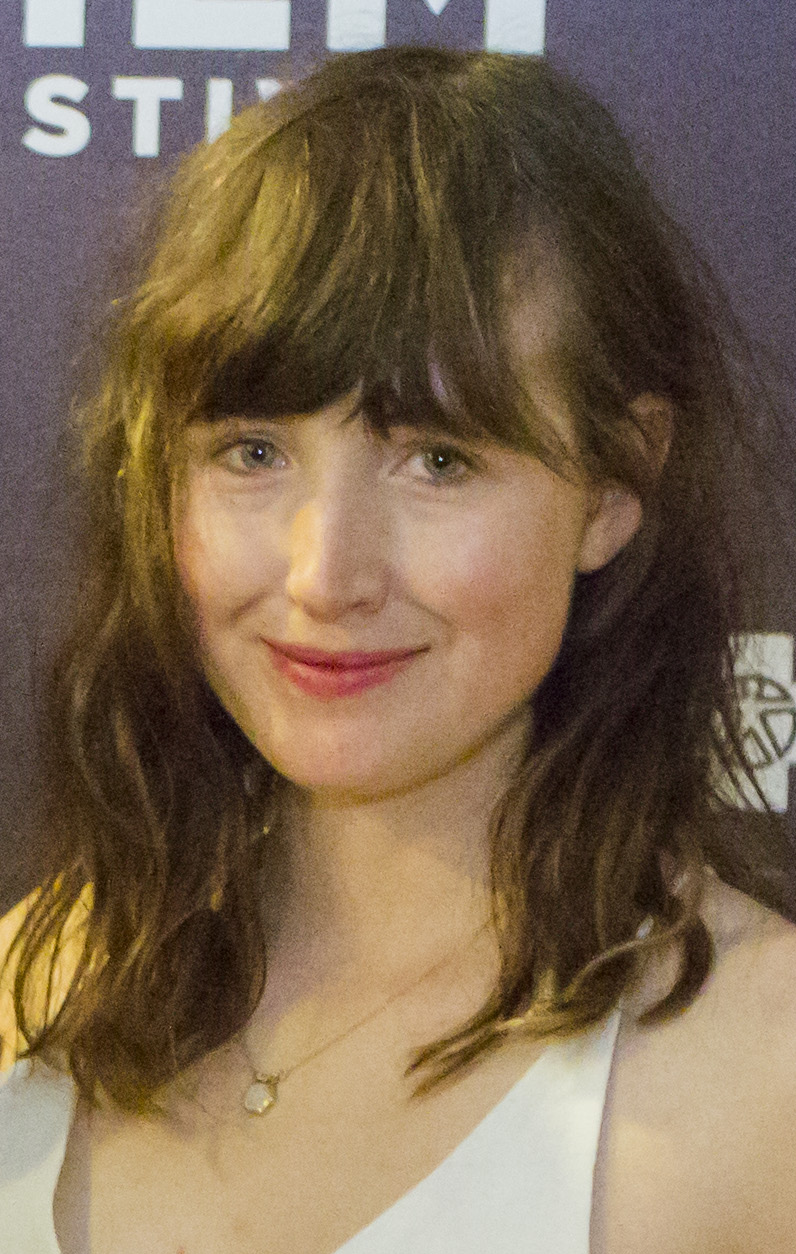
- Sheil in 2016
- Born: June 13, 1985 (age 41); Jersey City, New Jersey, U.S.
- Education: New York University (BFA)
- Occupation: Actress
- Years active: 2007–present
- Spouse: Kyle Mooney (m. 2021)
- Children: 1

Kate Lyn Sheil (born June 13, 1985) is an American actress. She has had roles in independent films like You're Next, V/H/S, The Color Wheel, The Sacrament, and the Netflix series House of Cards.

== Early life ==
Sheil was born and raised in Jersey City, New Jersey. She studied at New York University's Tisch School of the Arts, graduating in 2006 with a B.F.A. in acting. She also studied acting at the Lee Strasberg Theatre and Film Institute.

== Career ==
In 2016, after her film Kate Plays Christine premiered at the Sundance Film Festival, she was dubbed "the Meryl Streep of the micro-budget film community" by Rolling Stone.

In 2020, Sheil starred in She Dies Tomorrow directed by Amy Seimetz, which was initially set to premiere at South by Southwest in March 2020; however, the festival was scrapped due to the COVID-19 pandemic. The film was released by Neon via video on demand on August 7, 2020.

In 2023, Sheil starred in The Seeding directed by Barnaby Clay, which premiered at the Tribeca Film Festival in June 2023.

== Personal life ==
Sheil has been married to comedian Kyle Mooney since 2021.

When interviewed for the newsletter Perfectly Imperfect in December 2023, Mooney revealed he and Sheil had welcomed a daughter.

== Filmography ==
=== Film ===
Year	Title	Role	Notes
2007	Aliens	Lisa	Short film
2009	Knife Point	Anna	Short film
2009	Impolex	Katie	
2010	Gabi on the Roof in July	Dory	
2010	SkyDiver (Instructional Video #4: Preparation for Mission)	Kate Lyn Sheil	
2011	The Zone	Kate	
2011	Happy Life	Leslie	
2011	Silver Bullets	Claire	
2011	Green	Genevieve	
2011	The Color Wheel	Julia	
2011	You're Next	Talia	
2011	Cat Scratch Fever	Mary Ellen	
2011	Catching Up at Rock Bottom	Sara	Short film
2012	The Comedy	Waitress	
2012	V/H/S	Girl	Segment: "Second Honeymoon"
2012	Sun Don't Shine	Crystal	
2012	Somebody Up There Likes Me	Ex-Wife	
2012	The Unspeakable Act	Madeleine	
2012	First Winter	Kate	
2013	Pollywogs	Sarah	
2013	Hellaware	Lexie	
2013	The Apocalypse	Kate	Short film
2013	The Sacrament	Sarah	
2014	Listen Up Philip	Nancy	
2014	Empire Builder	Jenny	
2014	The Heart Machine	Virginia	
2014	Super Sleuths	Sally Blue Frankenfrass	Short film
2014	Young Bodies Heal Quickly	Sister	
2014	Helberger in Paradise	Nora	Short film
2014	Thanksgiving	Kate	
2014	The Hardest Word	Hannah	Short film
2015	Queen of Earth	Michelle	
2015	Kiss Kiss Fingerbang	Alison	Short film
2015	A Wonderful Cloud	Katelyn	
2015	Tears of God	Ida	
2015	Equals	Kate	
2015	Men Go To Battle	Josephine Small	
2015	Octopus	Olivia	Short film
2016	Kate Plays Christine	Self	Documentary
2016	Buster's Mal Heart	Marty	
2016	Children	Heidi	Short film
2017	Golden Exits	Patient	
2017	Brigsby Bear	Nina and Arielle Smiles	
2017	Thank You for Your Service	Bell	
2017	Radio Mary	Mary	
2018	Mountain Rest	Frankie	
2019	The Sound of Silence	Nancy	
2019	Lost Holiday	Margaret	
2019	White Echo	Carla	Short film
2020	She Dies Tomorrow	Amy	
2021	Kendra and Beth	Beth	
2023	The Seeding	Alina	
2023	Jamojaya		

=== Television ===
Year	Title	Role	Notes
2012	American Experience	Harriet Beecher Stowe	TV series documentary
2013	The Traditions	Michaela	TV series
2014–2015, 2017	House of Cards	Lisa Williams	Recurring role
2016	The Girlfriend Experience	Avery Suhr	3 episodes
2016–2017	Outcast	Allison Barnes	11 episodes
2017–2019	Easy	Annie's Roommate	2 episodes
2018–2019	High Maintenance	Jules	4 episodes
2019–2021	City on a Hill	Tara Sheehan	2 episodes
2023	Swarm	Cricket	Episode: "Running Scared"
