= All the Light in the Sky =

2012 American drama film

- Theatrical release poster
- Directed by: Joe Swanberg
- Written by: Joe Swanberg; Jane Adams
- Produced by: Joe Swanberg; Adam Donaghey
- Starring: Jane Adams; Sophia Takal; Kent Osborne; Larry Fessenden; Lawrence Michael Levine; Lindsay Burdge; Ti West
- Cinematography: Joe Swanberg
- Edited by: Joe Swanberg
- Music by: Orange Mighty Trio
- Production company: Swanberry Productions
- Distributed by: Factory 25
- Release dates: November 3, 2012 (AFI); December 20, 2013 (United States)
- Running time: 79 minutes
- Language: English

All the Light in the Sky is an American drama film directed by Joe Swanberg and written by Swanberg and Jane Adams, who also stars in the film, along with Sophia Takal, Kent Osborne, Lawrence Michael Levine, Larry Fessenden, and Lindsay Burdge. The film had its world premiere at the AFI on November 3, 2012.

The film was released on video on demand on December 3, 2013, before being released in a limited release on December 20, 2013, by Factory25.

== Premise ==
The film follows Marie (Jane Adams), an actress struggling with the prospect of aging, which becomes all the more apparent when her 25-year-old, aspiring actress niece Faye (Sophia Takal) arrives for a weekend stay.

== Cast ==
- Jane Adams as Marie
- Sophia Takal as Faye
- Kent Osborne as Dan
- Lawrence Michael Levine as Larry
- Larry Fessenden as Rusty
- Lindsay Burdge as Suzanne

== Production ==
Director Joe Swanberg also served as the film's cinematographer and editor.

== Release ==
The film had its world premiere on November 3, 2012, at the AFI Film Festival. In November 2013, it was announced, Factory25 had acquired distribution rights to the film. It was released on video on demand on December 3, 2013, prior to a limited release on December 20, 2013.

== Reception ==
All the Light in the Sky has been positively received by critics. The film holds a 78% approval rating on Rotten Tomatoes. Andrew Barker, writing for Variety, wrote that the film delivered "clever pacing, solid technique and a deeply soulful lead performance from co-scripter Jane Adams". It has a 62/100 on Metacritic.
