= The Dish & the Spoon =

The Dish & The Spoon
- Theatrical Poster
- Directed by: Alison Bagnall
- Screenplay by: Alison Bagnall; Andrew Lewis
- Story by: Alison Bagnall
- Starring: Greta Gerwig; Olly Alexander
- Cinematography: Mark Schwartzbard
- Edited by: Darrin Navarro
- Release date: 2011
- Running time: 93 minutes
- Language: English

The Dish & the Spoon is a 2011 American film directed by Alison Bagnall, starring Greta Gerwig, Olly Alexander, Eleonore Hendricks and Amy Seimetz.

== Plot ==
Rose (Greta Gerwig) is in a depressive episode after being cheated on by her husband (Adam Rothenberg). She drives far from home to isolate herself at a boarded-up beach town in Delaware. She spends all her cash on beer, and finds a comatose boy (Olly Alexander). Rose first tries to get him to a hospital, but he awakens and refuses. The boy reveals he had just been broken up with, and says he has nowhere to go.

Rose drags the boy along with her as she looks to confront her former friend Emma (Eleonore Hendricks), for sleeping with her husband. They spend the entire day looking for Emma while engaging in unruly shenanigans, but do not find her. Rose tells the boy she plans to kill Emma. The two then go to Rose's parents' summer house, where they bond and spend the night.

They generally display different responses to their experience of being jilted, Rose often shouting fiercely at or about her husband and his lover, while the boy is more lost and subdued. Rose calls her husband and appears to make amends with him, but continues to stay with the boy at the beach house.

Roses initiates a role-play scenario with the boy, and dresses him up as a woman so she can play the part of the macho male. They go to a restaurant where Rose kisses him. The boy breaks character and tells her to stop, angering her. Rose then abandons the boy at the restaurant and goes on a saddening walk around town. Feeling guilty, she returns to the restaurant hours later to find the whole restaurant singing along as the boy plays piano, entertaining them all. Rose apologizes to him and he accepts.

The next day, the boy finds out from a coworker that Emma will be attending a victorian-era dance group later that week. The boy and Rose sneak into the building where the dance will be, and he plays piano for Rose to dance to. The two plan on attending the dance, but the boy does not tell Rose that Emma will be there.

They spend the following morning on a fishing boat, catching a large fish. That night they share a genuine kiss, and the boy says he would like to marry her and have children; Rose plays into his fantasy. The next day they have a vintage photo taken of them in wedding clothes, then finishing their dream relationship by showing him her future burial plot. The two attend the dance together, and tell others that they are husband and wife. When Rose finally sees Emma, she attacks her, chases her, and attempts to strangle her to death. After catching the boy's eye, Rose lets Emma go, before breaking into tears.

Rose offers to drive the boy to the airport so he can go back to England, but the boy asks to meet Rose's husband. The two drive away from the beach town where all their shenanigans took place. Rose returns to her house and embraces her husband, having forgiven him. The boy finally shows anger by pushing her husband to ground. Rose and her husband go inside the house to talk. Having been left by Rose, the boy collapses, heartbroken again.

When Rose comes back outside, the boy is gone and has left her a wrapped present. Rose sits with the present as the boy walks off, alone.

== Cast ==
- Greta Gerwig as Rose
- Olly Alexander as Boy
- Eleonore Hendricks as Emma
- Amy Seimetz as Emma's Friend
- Adam Rothenberg as Rose's Husband
- Dan Seely as the Cashier
- Sam Calagione as the Brewery Manager
- H.D. Parsons as the Fisherman

== Reception ==
On the review aggregator website Rotten Tomatoes, 64% of 14 critics' reviews are positive, with an average rating of 6.2/10.
