= Gabi on the Roof in July =

- Film poster
- Directed by: Lawrence Michael Levine
- Written by: Kate Kirtz; Lawrence Michael Levine
- Produced by: Jason Connell; Sophia Takal; Katherine Wright; Isen Robbins; Aimee Schoof
- Starring: Sophia Takal; Lawrence Michael Levine; Kate Lyn Sheil
- Cinematography: Aaron Kovalchik
- Edited by: Sophia Takal
- Music by: Kevin Barker
- Production company: Little Teeth Pictures
- Release date: February 27, 2010 (Cinequest Film Festival)
- Running time: 101 minutes
- Country: United States
- Language: English

Gabi on the Roof in July is a 2010 American independent comedy-drama film directed by Lawrence Michael Levine.

== Synopsis ==
Gabi (Sophia Takal), a rambunctious Oberlin undergrad, heads to New York City to spend the summer with her older brother, Sam (Lawrence Michael Levine).

== Cast ==
- Sophia Takal as Gabi
- Lawrence Michael Levine as Sam
- Brooke Bloom as Madeline
- Louis Cancelmi as Garrett
- Amy Seimetz as Chelsea
- Kate Lyn Sheil as Dory
- Lena Dunham as Colby
- Robert White as Charles
- Tarajia Morrell as Astrid
- Jay DePietro as Phil

== Production ==
The dialogue in the film is both scripted and improvised.

== Reception ==
Gabi on the Roof in July has been generally well received by critics. On Rotten Tomatoes the film holds a 73% rating based on 11 reviews. Steve Dollar, writing for The Wall Street Journal, noted that the film is "wisely observant of human nature as it bounces between the leads, "Gabi" evokes Woody Allen with a more generous heart."

== Release ==
The film premiered at the Cinequest Film Festival on February 27, 2010.
