= Sun Don't Shine =

2012 film by Amy Seimetz

- Theatrical release poster
- Directed by: Amy Seimetz
- Written by: Amy Seimetz
- Produced by: Kim Sherman; Amy Seimetz
- Starring: Kate Lyn Sheil; Kentucker Audley; Kit Gwinn; A. J. Bowen; Mark Reeb
- Cinematography: Jay Keitel
- Edited by: David Lowery; Amy Seimetz
- Music by: Ben Lovett
- Distributed by: Factory25
- Release dates: March 10, 2012 (SXSW); April 26, 2013 (United States)
- Running time: 82 minutes
- Country: United States
- Language: English

Sun Don't Shine is a 2012 American thriller film written and directed by Amy Seimetz and starring Kate Lyn Sheil and Kentucker Audley. It first premiered on March 10, 2012 at the South by Southwest Film Festival, where it won a Special Jury Award. The film was released in a limited release and through video on demand on April 26, 2013, by Factory25.

== Plot ==
Crystal and Leo are a couple on the run after Crystal murdered her husband when he accused her of cheating on him with Leo. Leo tries to help the weak and needy Crystal by taking them to St. Petersburg, Florida where they hope to ditch the body and he hopes to get help from a friend that Crystal suspects is one of his ex-girlfriends.

When they arrive, Leo leaves Crystal at a campsite and goes to spend the evening with his ex. Afraid of being alone, Crystal goes to the ex's house where she sees Leo kissing her and attacks them both, threatening them with a knife. Leo manages to get Crystal to drop the knife and the two leave.

Leo drops Crystal off at Weeki Wachee Springs where she watches the mermaid show. In the meantime, he tries to rent a boat, however the owner of the boat rental asks him to leave after he glimpses the inside of the trunk which contains Crystal's husband.

Leo enters Weeki Wachee Springs and retrieves Crystal before returning to the boat place where they go in the water and throw in the bodies of Crystal's husband and the boat man, whom Leo also killed to protect them. Leo angrily berates Crystal who flies into a rage and hits him with an oar. Believing she has killed him she gets out of the boat and wades to the shore where she sees that local police have arrived. Crystal runs off into the swampland. Meanwhile, Leo recovers from being knocked out and returns to shore where he turns himself in.

Crystal wanders into someone's back garden. Seeing a pool she gets in and begins to swim. The owner of the property arrives and asks Crystal if she wants her to call the police. Crystal tells her "Not yet."

== Cast ==
- Kate Lyn Sheil as Crystal
- A. J. Bowen as Highway Angel
- Kentucker Audley as Leo
- Kit Gwin as Terri
- Mark Reeb as Boatman

== Reception ==
Critical reception for Sun Don't Shine has been generally positive and the film holds a rating of 70 on Metacritic (based on 8 reviews) and 92% on Rotten Tomatoes (based on 24 reviews). The New York Times and New York Post both praised the film's acting and direction, and the reviewer for the New York Times remarked that the film "unspools like a Françoise Sagan novel: purposefully, enigmatically and with a raw emotional purity that makes its volatile central couple appear even more defenseless than they really are."

=== Awards ===
- Chicken & Egg Emergent Narrative Woman Director Award, South by Southwest (2012, won)
- Bingham Ray Breakthrough Director Award, Gotham Independent Film Awards (2013, nominated)
- Best Film Not Playing at a Theater Near You, Gotham Independent Film Awards (2013, nominated)
