= Kentucker Audley =

American filmmaker and actor

- Born: Andrew Michael Nenninger; November 13, 1981 (age 44); St. Louis, Missouri, United States
- Education: University of Memphis
- Years active: 2006–present
- Spouse: Caroline White (m. 2016)
- Website: www.kentuckeraudley.com

Andrew Michael Nenninger (born November 13, 1981), known professionally as Kentucker Audley, is an American filmmaker and actor. He appeared on the Filmmaker magazine's 2007 list of 25 New Faces of Independent Film. He founded the independent film platform NoBudge, first as a Tumblr blog in 2011 and then a full website in 2015.

== Early life ==
Audley was born in St. Louis, Missouri to parents Jane and Michael and grew up in Lexington, Kentucky. He attended Mary Queen of the Holy Rosary School and then Lexington Catholic High School. He began his studies in film and video production at Savannah College of Art & Design and gained experience at the Memphis Digital Media Co-Op before going on to graduate from the University of Memphis in 2005. His pseudonym is an homage to his home state of Kentucky.

== Artistry ==
Early in his career, Audley was commonly associated with the Southern mumblecore movement, his first feature film Team Picture (2007) being principal among it. He first became interested in film when he watched Wes Anderson's Bottle Rocket (1996) in the eighth grade. He has cited the likes of Jim Jarmusch, John Cassavetes, and Jean-Luc Godard as his inspirations.

== Personal life ==
Audley lives in Brooklyn with his wife and collaborator Caroline White. The couple met in 2005 while visiting Graceland in Memphis and married in July 2016 at Box Hill Estate on Long Island, New York.

== Filmography ==
=== Filmmaking ===
Year	Title	Director	Writer	Producer	Editor	Other	Notes
2007	Team Picture	Yes	Yes	No	Yes		
2010	Holy Land	Yes	Yes	Yes	Yes	Cinematographer	
2010	Open Five	Yes	Yes	No	No		
2012	Marriage Material	No	Yes	No	No		
2012	White Fox Mask	No	Additional	No	No		
2012	Open Five 2	Yes	No	Yes	Yes		
2015	Funny Bunny	No	Yes	No	Yes		Co-written with Olly Alexander and Alison Bagnall
2017	Sylvio	Yes	Yes	Yes	No		Co-directed with Albert Birney
2021	Strawberry Mansion	Yes	Yes	No	No		Co-directed with Albert Birney

=== Acting ===
Year	Title	Role	Notes
2007	Team Picture	David	
2010	Open Five	Kentucker	
2010	Passenger Pigeons	Jesse	
2011	Bad Fever	Eddie	
2011	The Zone	Himself	
2012	Marriage Material	Andrew	
2012	V/H/S	Rox	Segment: "Tape 56"
2012	Sun Don't Shine	Leo	
2012	The Romance of Loneliness	Richard	
2012	White Fox Mask	Federico	
2012	Open Five 2	Kentucker	
2013	Ain't Them Bodies Saints	Freddy	
2013	The Sacrament	Patrick	
2013	The Sixth Year	Matt	
2014	Christmas, Again	Noel	
2014	Felt	Kenny	
2014	Sabbatical	Dylan Hardin	
2015	Queen of Earth	James	
2015	Funny Bunny	Gene	
2015	Come Down Molly	Patrick	
2015	Ma	Policeman	
2015	The Middle Distance	James	
2017	It Happened in L.A.	Peter	
2017	Sylvio	Al Reynolds	
2018	American Woman	Brett Tobeck	
2018	Her Smell	Roy	
2019	Saul at Night	Saul	
2019	At the Park by the Creek	Radio Personality	
2020	She Dies Tomorrow	Craig	
2021	Strawberry Mansion	James Preble	
2023	Somewhere Quiet	Scott Whitman	
