= NoBudge =

Film distribution and streaming platform

- Website type: Film platform
- Available in: English
- Owner: Kentucker Audley
- Website: nobudge.com
- Commercial: Yes
- Launched: 2011
- Current status: Active

NoBudge is an independent film platform founded in 2011 by filmmaker and curator Kentucker Audley. The platform is known for showcasing micro-budget and independent films. NoBudge's programming includes narrative shorts, feature films, documentaries, experimental works, web series, and music videos.

NoBudge operates on a subscription-based model, allowing users to access films for a monthly or annual fee, of which a portion is shared with filmmakers.

It hosts "NoBudge Live", which are in-person film screenings, mainly in Brooklyn, New York, and occasionally in Los Angeles.

== History ==
NoBudge was founded in 2011 by filmmaker Kentucker Audley, initially as a Tumblr blog where he curated a selection of independent films, including his own work and films by other low-budget filmmakers.

In 2015, NoBudge transitioned from its original Tumblr format to a website, allowing it to expand its offerings and host a larger variety of content, including narrative shorts, feature films, documentaries, experimental films, and music videos.

In 2021, NoBudge launched a subscription model, allowed the platform to generate revenue through user subscriptions while sharing a percentage of the earnings with filmmakers.

== Content ==
In addition to streaming content, NoBudge has featured editorial content, including filmmaker interviews, essays, and articles discussing independent filmmaking.

== Reception ==
The platform has received acclaim for its commitment to supporting low-budget cinema. Vulture described NoBudge as "all over the place, but though the films can be quirky or experimental, they’re also frequently clever and conventionally enjoyable", while The Los Angeles Times noted its role in creating a space for films made outside of commercial considerations.

== Filmmakers ==
Notable filmmakers who have featured on NoBudge include:

- Kentucker Audley
- Jim Cummings
- Joe Swanberg
- The Safdie Brothers
- Samy Burch
- Joanna Arnow
- Stephen Gurewitz
- Alex Ross Perry
- Adrian Anderson & Patrick Gray
