= Alison Bagnall =

American filmmaker

Alison Bagnall is an American filmmaker. She wrote and directed the 2011 feature film The Dish & the Spoon. She also wrote and directed the 2015 feature film Funny Bunny.

In addition to filmmaking, she is also a professor at Drexel University as of 2025.

== Filmography ==
=== As director and screenwriter ===
- Piggie (2003)
- The Dish & the Spoon (2011)
- Funny Bunny (2015)

=== As screenwriter only ===
- Buffalo '66 (1998)
