= The Seeding =

- Theatrical release poster
- Directed by: Barnaby Clay
- Written by: Barnaby Clay
- Produced by: Brian R. Etting; Josh H. Etting
- Starring: Scott Haze; Kate Lyn Sheil
- Cinematography: Robert Leitzell
- Music by: Tristan Bechet
- Production companies: Garlin Pictures; Out of the Ether
- Distributed by: Magnet Releasing
- Release dates: June 11, 2023 (Tribeca Festival); January 26, 2024 (United States)
- Running time: 100 minutes
- Country: United States
- Language: English
- Box office: $4,974

The Seeding is a 2023 American horror thriller film, starring Scott Haze, Kate Lyn Sheil, Alex Montaldo, and directed by Barnaby Clay.

The film premiered at the Tribeca Festival on June 11, 2023, before being released in the United States on January 26, 2024. The film received mixed reviews from critics.

== Premise ==
A man finds himself trapped in a desert canyon with a woman living off-grid who is captive to a pack of sadistic boys.

== Cast ==
- Scott Haze as Wyndham Stone
- Kate Lyn Sheil as Alina
- Alex Montaldo as Corvus
- Charlie Avink as Orion
- Thatcher Jacobs as Lepus
- Chelsea Jurkiewicz as Caitlyn
- Harrison Middleton as Crux
- Michael Monsour as Arvo
- Soko as Hiker
- Aarman Touré as Vela

== Release ==
The Seeding premiered at the Tribeca Festival on June 11, 2023. On September 20, 2023, Magnet Releasing picked up distribution rights for the film. The film was released theatrically in limited format, and on PVOD on January 26, 2024.

== Reception ==
=== Box office ===
On its first week, the film opened in 18 theaters, and made its weekly gross of $4,600, ranking in 61. On its second week, it fell from 91.9%, and made $374, ranking in 66. Its total gross was $4,974.

=== Critical response ===
The film received mixed reviews. On the review aggregator website Rotten Tomatoes, 56% of 36 critics' reviews are positive, with an average rating of 5.00/10. The website's consensus reads: "Rich atmosphere and a handful of genuinely disturbing moments are only sporadically enough to outweigh The Seeding's monotonous pace and lack of narrative depth." Metacritic, which uses a weighted average, assigned the film a score of 47 out of 100, based on 7 critics, indicating "mixed or average" reviews.

Phil Hoad of The Guardian gave The Seeding three out of five stars and found it to be a visually striking horror film with a compelling performance by Scott Haze, but notes that the plot feels stretched and the characters underdeveloped as Wyndham's descent into his predicament unfolds too easily. Simon Abrams of RogerEbert.com gave the film two out of four stars and described it as a "bleak horror movie" with strong location photography and unsettling moments, but ultimately finds it repetitive and emotionally flat, struggling to engage viewers beyond superficial shocks.

Oscar Goff of Boston Hassle considered the film to be an overwhelming sensory experience that effectively captivates through its eerie atmosphere and visuals, even if its plot and character dynamics are somewhat unclear and underdeveloped, ultimately deeming it a memorable entry in the folk horror genre. Jordan Bond of Film Threat gave the film 8.5/10 and offered a positive review, praising the film for its realistic and creepily immersive storytelling that builds a pervasive sense of dread without relying on jump scares, making it a disturbing yet thought-provoking addition to the horror genre.
