= The Myth of the American Sleepover =

2010 film by David Robert Mitchell

- Film poster
- Directed by: David Robert Mitchell
- Written by: David Robert Mitchell
- Produced by: Justin Barber; Michael Ferris Gibson; Adele Romanski; Cherie Saulter
- Starring: Claire Sloma; Marlon Morton; Amanda Bauer; Brett Jacobsen; Nikita Ramsey; Jade Ramsey; Amy Seimetz
- Cinematography: James Laxton
- Edited by: Julio Perez IV
- Music by: Kyle Newmaster
- Distributed by: IFC Films
- Release dates: March 13, 2010 (SXSW); July 22, 2011 (United States)
- Running time: 93 minutes
- Country: United States
- Language: English
- Budget: $50,000
- Box office: $41,045

The Myth of the American Sleepover is a 2010 American coming-of-age comedy drama film written and directed by David Robert Mitchell. It had its world premiere at South by Southwest on March 13, 2010, and was released in the United States on July 22, 2011, by IFC Films. It received positive reviews from critics.

== Plot ==
Four young people navigate through suburban Detroit, in search of love and adventure on their last weekend of summer vacation.

== Cast ==
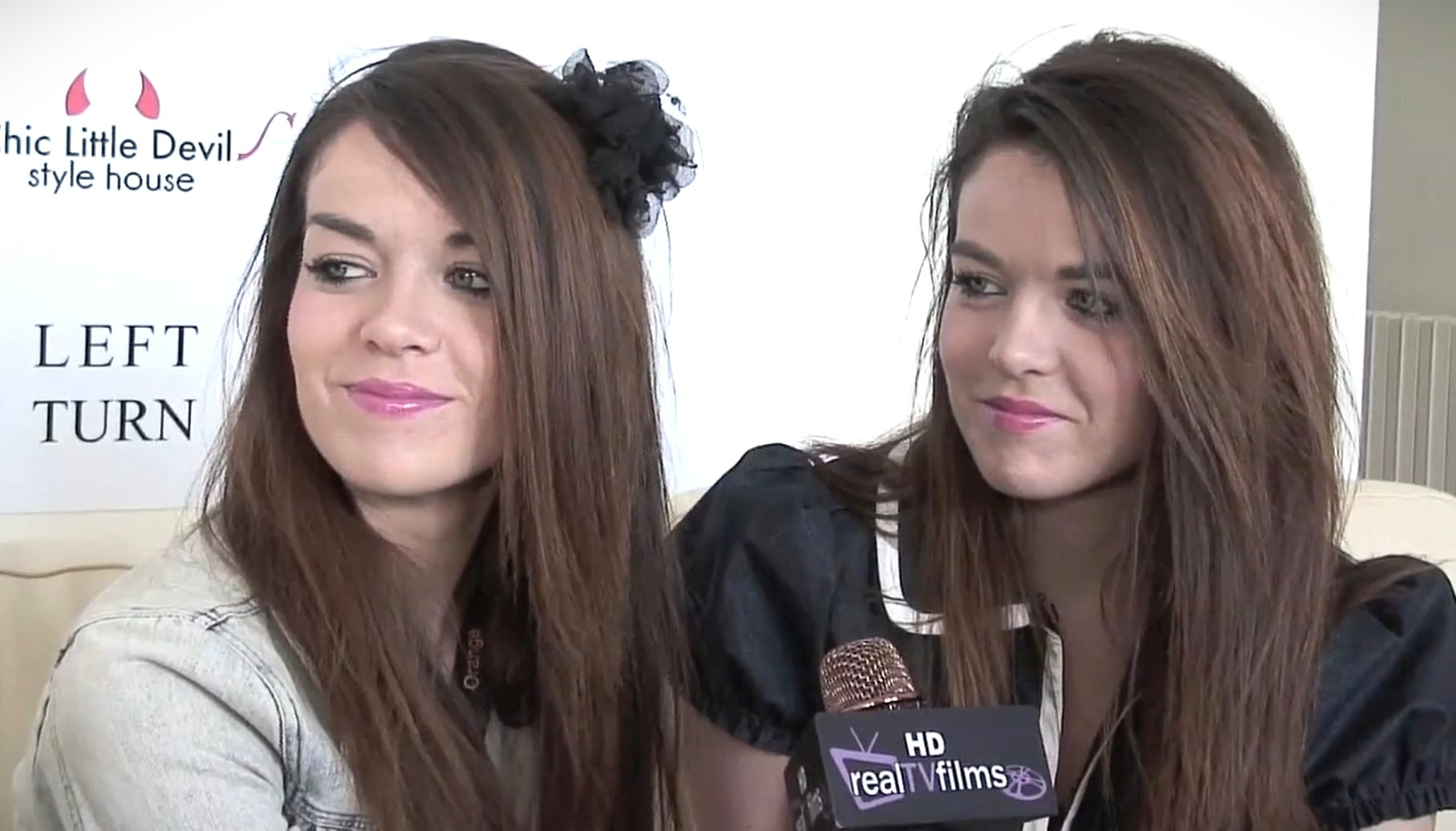
Actresses Jade and Nikita Ramsey discuss The Myth of the American Sleepover in 2010

- Claire Sloma as Maggie
- Marlon Morton as Rob Salvati
- Amanda Bauer as Claudia
- Brett Jacobsen as Scott Holland
- Nikita Ramsey as Ady Abbey
- Jade Ramsey as Anna Abbey
- Annette DeNoyer as Beth
- Wyatt McCallum as Marcus
- Mary Wardell as Jen Holland
- Douglas Diedrich as Steven
- Dane Jones as Emma
- Shayla Curran as Janelle Ramsey
- Drew Machak as Andy
- Christopher Simon as Sean Barber
- Madi Ortiz as the Grocery Store Girl
- Amy Seimetz as Julie

== Critical reception ==
On review aggregator Rotten Tomatoes, the film holds an 81% score based on 48 reviews with an average rating of 6.9/10. The site's critical consensus reads "Somber and sweet, The Myth of the American Sleepover authentically evokes adolescence -- and all of the awkwardness and heartbreak that comes with it." Metacritic gave the film a weighted average score of 67 out of 100, based on 15 critics, indicating "generally favorable" reviews.
