= Lost Holiday (2019 film) =

- Film poster
- Directed by: Michael Matthews; Thomas Matthews
- Written by: Michael Matthews; Thomas Matthews
- Produced by: Michael Matthews; Thomas Matthews
- Starring: Kate Lyn Sheil
- Cinematography: Donavan Sell
- Edited by: Katie Ennis
- Music by: James Iha
- Production company: Matthews Brothers
- Distributed by: Comedy Dynamics
- Release date: January 2019 (Slamdance)
- Running time: 75 minutes
- Country: United States
- Language: English

Lost Holiday is a 2019 American mystery comedy film written, produced and directed by Michael Matthews and Thomas Matthews and starring Kate Lyn Sheil.

== Cast ==
- Kate Lyn Sheil
- Thomas Matthews
- Keith Poulson
- William Jackson Harper
- Ismenia Mendes
- Emily Mortimer (voice)
- Tone Tank
- Joshua Leonard
- Isiah Whitlock Jr.

== Production ==
The film was shot in 16mm.

== Release ==
The film premiered at the 2019 Slamdance Film Festival.

In September 2019, Comedy Dynamics acquired distribution rights to the film.

== Reception ==
The film has a 42% rating on Rotten Tomatoes. Bradley Gibson of Film Threat awarded the film a 6 out of 10.
