= Funny Bunny =

- Poster
- Directed by: Alison Bagnall
- Written by: Olly Alexander; Kentucker Audley; Joslyn Jensen; Alison Bagnall
- Produced by: Ted Speaker; Laura Heberton; Vinay Singh; Tara Ann Culp
- Starring: Olly Alexander; Kentucker Audley; Joslyn Jensen
- Cinematography: Ashley Connor
- Edited by: Kentucker Audley; David Barker; Caleb Johnson
- Music by: Melanie Hsu
- Production companies: Magic Owl; Cervidae Films; Hot Metal Films
- Distributed by: FilmBuff
- Release date: March 15, 2015 (SXSW)
- Running time: 86 minutes 89 minutes
- Country: United States
- Language: English

Funny Bunny is a 2015 American comedy drama film written by Olly Alexander, Kentucker Audley, Alison Bagnall and Joslyn Jensen, directed by Bagnall, and starring Alexander, Audley and Jensen.

== Cast ==
- Kentucker Audley as Gene
- Joslyn Jensen as Ginger
- Olly Alexander as Titty
- Louis Cancelmi as Peter
- Josephine Decker
- Anna Margaret Hollyman as Anna
- Nicholas Webber as Tim
- Michael Pantozzi as Herman

== Release ==
The film premiered at South by Southwest on March 15, 2015. It was also screened on June 5, 2015 at the Brooklyn Film Festival. Then it was released theatrically on November 13, 2015.

== Reception ==
The film has a 57% rating on Rotten Tomatoes based on seven reviews. Chuck Bowen of Slant Magazine awarded the film three stars out of four.

Steve Dollar of The Wall Street Journal gave the film a positive review and wrote, “ Writer-director Alison Bagnall’s films don’t lack for compassionate, screwball humor, but their unique charms tend to be indivisible from their eccentricities.”

Simon Abrams of The Village Voice gave the film a negative review and wrote, “ We watch three emotionally stunted strangers act out like spoiled, overgrown adolescents, forming a love triangle that’s not bizarre so much as obnoxious. But we never learn what draws these inarticulate characters together beyond mutual estrangement.”

== Awards ==
At the 18th Brooklyn Film Festival, Olly Alexander won the Best Actor Award and Kentucker Audley, David Barker and Caleb Johnson won the Best Editing Award.
