= Night Nurse (2026 film) =

- Theatrical release poster
- Directed by: Georgia Bernstein
- Written by: Georgia Bernstein
- Produced by: Veronica Barbosa; Georgia Bernstein; Liane Cunje; Edwin Linker; Lucy Rogers
- Starring: Cemre Paksoy; Bruce McKenzie; Eleonore Hendricks; Colleen Rose Trundy; Mimi Rogers
- Cinematography: Lidia Nikonova
- Edited by: Alex Jacobs
- Music by: Steven Jackson; Sam Clapp
- Production companies: Missing Link Productions; Gary Prairie Productions
- Distributed by: Independent Film Company
- Release dates: January 26, 2026 (Sundance); July 10, 2026 (United States)
- Running time: 95 minutes
- Country: United States
- Language: English
- Box office: $127,131

Night Nurse is a 2026 American erotic thriller film written, produced, and directed by Georgia Bernstein. It stars Cemre Paksoy, Bruce McKenzie, Eleonore Hendricks, Colleen Rose Trundy, and Mimi Rogers.

== Plot ==
Eleni Sadik, a young nurse, takes a night job at a wealthy retirement community, where she is assigned to Douglas Callum, an elderly resident with dementia. She soon learns that Douglas and his longtime caregiver, Mona, are running a phone scam from his room. Mona pretends to be a granddaughter in trouble while Douglas guides her through calls to elderly victims and gets them to send money.

Douglas brings Eleni into the scam and has her make calls too. She is reluctant at first, but the role-playing becomes sexual and she is attracted to Douglas. She soon becomes a willing part of the scheme, causing tension with Mona.

After Douglas's condition seems to get worse, he is moved to assisted living and given a new nurse, Michelle. Eleni becomes jealous of Michelle and holds her captive, forcing her to make a scam call while Douglas lies sedated nearby. When Douglas wakes, Michelle begs him for help, but he instead smothers her. Police arrive soon afterward.

When questioning Douglas, police conclude that he is confused and "talking nonsense." While being questioned, however, he looks toward Eleni and recites five words from a memory test he had failed earlier, showing her that he had been faking his dementia all along.

== Cast ==
- Cemre Paksoy as Eleni Sadik
- Bruce McKenzie as Douglas
- Eleonore Hendricks as Mona
- Colleen Rose Trundy as Michelle
- Mimi Rogers as Doctor Mann
- Keith Kupferer as Detective Murphy

== Production ==
In July 2024, it was announced that Georgia Bernstein would make her feature film directorial debut on an erotic thriller film, starring Cemre Paksoy, Bruce McKenzie, Eleonore Hendricks, Colleen Rose Trundy, and Mimi Rogers. Principal photography began on September 6, 2024, in Chicago.

== Release ==
Night Nurse premiered at the Sundance Film Festival on January 26, 2026. In June 2026, Independent Film Company acquired U.S. and Canadian distribution rights to the film, was released theatrically on July 10.

== Reception ==
On the review aggregator website Rotten Tomatoes, the film holds an approval rating of 65%, based on 63 reviews, with an average rating of 6.1/10. The website's consensus reads, "A moody, intriguingly offbeat debut with a timely premise and hypnotic atmosphere, Night Nurse ultimately proves more compelling as an eerie character study than a fully satisfying thriller." On Metacritic, the film has a weighted average score of 66 out of 100 based on 9 critics, which the site labels as "generally favorable" reviews.
