= Jane Adams (actress, born 1965) =

American actress (born 1965)

- Born: April 1, 1965 (age 61)
- Education: University of Washington; Cornish College of the Arts; Juilliard School (BFA)
- Occupations: Actress, writer
- Years active: 1985–present
- Known for: Frasier; Happiness; Hung; Eternal Sunshine of the Spotless Mind; An Inspector Calls; All the Light in the Sky
- Awards: Tony Award for Best Featured Actress in a Play

Jane Adams (born April 1, 1965) is an American actress and screenwriter. Known for her work in independent cinema, her acting credits include Light Sleeper (1992), Happiness (1998), Mumford (1999), Songcatcher (2000), The Anniversary Party (2001), Eternal Sunshine of the Spotless Mind (2004), Little Children (2006), All the Light in the Sky (2012), and She Dies Tomorrow (2020).

On television, she appeared in the recurring role of Dr. Mel Karnofsky on the NBC sitcom Frasier (1999–2000) and co-starred as Nikki Katz on HBO's drama series The Idol (2023). For her role as Tanya Skagl on HBO's Hung (2009–2011) she received a nomination for the Golden Globe Award. She was nominated for two Primetime Emmy Awards for Outstanding Guest Actress in a Comedy Series – in 2021 and 2022 – for portraying Nina Daniels on the HBO series Hacks (2021).

Adams made her Broadway debut in the original production of Paul Rudnick's I Hate Hamlet in 1991 and won a Tony Award for Best Featured Actress in a Play for her portrayal of Sheila Birling in the revival of J. B. Priestley's An Inspector Calls (1994).

== Early life and education ==
Jane Adams is the daughter of Janice, an administrative assistant, and William Adams, an engineer. She attended the University of Washington, where she studied political science, and the Cornish College of the Arts, where she took theater. She attended the Juilliard School's Drama Division (1985–1989, Group 18) where she graduated with a Bachelor of Fine Arts degree in 1989.

== Career ==
Adams performed theatre at the Seattle Repertory Theatre. She turned down the chance to work in the hit movie Sister Act with Whoopi Goldberg for the opportunity to work with Arthur Miller onstage.

She worked with Steve Martin and Diane Keaton in Father of the Bride Part II. She returned to the stage and won the 1994 Tony Award for best performance by a featured actress in a play for the Broadway revival of An Inspector Calls. She also won the Outer Critics Circle Award for best debut performance in a play in the Broadway production of Paul Rudnick's I Hate Hamlet.

In 1996, Adams portrayed Karen Lukens in the ABC-TV drama series Relativity. In 1998, she starred in the misanthropic dark comedy Happiness with Philip Seymour Hoffman, playing the role of Joy, a sensitive single woman who is struggling with life. She and the cast won many ensemble awards. The next year, Adams got a recurring role on the comedy series Frasier from 1999 to 2000. She played Dr. Mel Karnofsky, who became Niles Crane's second wife. She also had a role in the 1999 film Mumford.

In 2001, she acted in the independent film Songcatcher, with Janet McTeer, which won a Sundance Special Jury Prize. She also portrayed Reeva Baines Eidenberg in the CBS drama series Citizen Baines. Adams has also acted in mainstream films such as You've Got Mail (1998), Wonder Boys (2000), Lemony Snicket's A Series of Unfortunate Events (2004), and Last Holiday (2006). In 2007, she appeared in The Sensation of Sight and The Brave One.

From 2009 to 2011, Adams co-starred in the HBO series Hung opposite Thomas Jane. She starred in and co-wrote the 2012 film All the Light in the Sky with director Joe Swanberg. This performance earned her the Best Actress award at the Nashville Film Festival.

== Acting credits ==
=== Film ===
Year	Title	Role	Notes
1985	Bombs Away	Greeting Girl	
1990	Vital Signs	Suzanne Maloney	
1992	Light Sleeper	Randi Jost	
1994	I Love Trouble	Evans	
1994	Mrs. Parker and the Vicious Circle	Ruth Hale	
1995	Father of the Bride Part II	Dr. Megan Eisenberg	
1996	Kansas City	Nettie Bolt	
1998	Music from Another Room	Irene	
1998	Happiness	Joy Jordan	
1998	Day at the Beach	Marie	
1998	You've Got Mail	Sydney Anne	Uncredited
1999	A Fish in the Bathtub	Ruthie	
1999	A Texas Funeral	Mary Joan	
1999	Mumford	Dr. Phyllis Sheeler	
2000	Songcatcher	Eleanor 'Elna' Penleric	
2000	Wonder Boys	Oola	
2001	The Anniversary Party	Clair Forsyth	
2002	Orange County	Mona	
2004	Eternal Sunshine of the Spotless Mind	Carrie	
2004	Lemony Snicket's A Series of Unfortunate Events	White-Faced Woman	
2006	Last Holiday	Rochelle	
2006	Little Children	Sheila	
2006	The Sensation of Sight	Alice	
2007	The Brave One	Nicole	
2008	The Wackness	Eleanor	
2008	Lifelines	Nancy Bernstein	
2009	Alexander the Last	Director	
2009	Calvin Marshall	June Marshall	
2011	The Lie	Dr. Bentel	
2011	Silver Bullets	June	
2011	Restless	Mabel	
2012	All the Light in the Sky	Marie	Also writer
2015	Digging for Fire	Woman on beach	
2015	Poltergeist	Dr. Brooke Powell	
2016	Always Shine	Summer	
2017	Brigsby Bear	April	
2018	Intervene	Gwendolyn	Short film
2020	She Dies Tomorrow	Jane	
2020	Build the Wall	Sarah	
2022	Dog	Tamara	
2022	Sick	Pamela	
2023	Year of the Fox	Paulene	

=== Television ===
Year	Title	Role	Notes
1986	Tales from the Darkside	Charlotte Rose Cantrell	Episode: "Deliver Us from Goodness"
1987, 1989	Family Ties	First Love / Marty Brodie	3 episodes
1989, 1995	ABC Afterschool Special	Elly Robinson / Michelle	2 episodes
1990	Rising Son	Meg Bradley	Television film
1993	Lifestories: Families in Crisis	Beth	Episode: "Dead Drunk: The Kevin Tunell Story"
1996	Relativity	Karen Lukens	7 episodes
1997	Liberty!	Sara Scott	6 episodes
1999	The Outer Limits	Mona Bailey	Episode: "What Will The Neighbors Think"
1999–2000	Frasier	Dr. Mel Karnofsky	Recurring; 11 episodes
2000	Citizen Baines	Reeva Eidenberg	9 episodes
2000	From Where I Sit	Ruth	Pilot
2001	Night Visions	Amanda	Episode: "The Doghouse"
2003	Carnivàle	Mother of Dead Baby	Uncredited; Episode: "Milfay"
2003	Law & Order: Criminal Intent	Sylvia Campbell	Episode: "The Gift"
2005	Stone Cold	Brianna Lincoln	Television film
2007	House	Bonnie	Episode: "House Training"
2008	In Plain Sight	Ruth Ferguson / Ruth Fraser	Episode: "Don of the Dead"
2009–2011	Hung	Tanya Skagle	30 episodes
2012	Law & Order: Special Victims Unit	Joanne Parsons	Episode: "Learning Curve"
2013	Axe Cop	Red Headed Women	Voice; Episode: "Super Axe"
2014	CSI: Crime Scene Investigation	Belinda Goff	Episode: "Rubbery Homicide"
2016–2019	Easy	Annabelle Jones	5 episodes
2016	Atlanta	Janice	Episode: "Nobody Beats the Biebs"
2017	Twin Peaks	Constance Talbot	6 episodes
2017	Claws	Gladys Coleman Pirette	4 episodes
2018–2019	Sneaky Pete	Maggie Murphy	8 episodes
2020	Messiah	Miriam Keneally	10 episodes
2021–2026	Hacks	Nina Daniels	9 episodes
2023	The Idol	Nikki Katz	5 episodes
2025	Good American Family	JJ	2 episodes

=== Theatre ===
Year	Title	Role	Playwright	Venue	Ref.
1991	I Hate Hamlet	Deirdre McDavey	Paul Rudnick	Walter Kerr Theater, Broadway	
1992	The Crucible	Mary Warren	Arthur Miller	Belasco Theater, Broadway	
1992	The Glass Menagerie	Laura Wingfield	Tennessee Williams	La Jolla Playhouse, Los Angeles	
1994	An Inspector Calls	Sheila Birling	J.B. Priestley	Royale Theatre, Broadway	
2003	Enchanted April	Rose Arnott (replacement)	Matthew Barber	Belasco Theater, Broadway	
2004	Match	Lisa	Stephen Belber	Plymouth Theater, Broadway	
2006	Resurrection Blues	Emily Shapiro	Arthur Miller	The Old Vic, West End	

== Awards and nominations ==
Year	Association	Category	Nominated work	Result	Ref.
1991	Clarence Derwent Awards	Best Supporting Female	I Hate Hamlet	Won	
1991	Outer Critics Circle Award	Best Debut Performance	I Hate Hamlet	Won	
1994	Drama Desk Award	Outstanding Featured Actress in a Play	An Inspector Calls	Won	
1994	Tony Award	Best Featured Actress in a Play	An Inspector Calls	Won	
1998	National Board of Review	National Board of Review Award for Best Cast	Happiness	Won	
2000	Sundance Film Festival	Special Jury Prize	Songcatcher	Won	
2010	Golden Globe Awards	Best Supporting Actress - Series, Miniseries or Television Film	Hung	Nominated	
2010	Women's Image Network Awards	Actress Comedy Series	Hung	Nominated	
2013	Nashville Film Festival	Best Actress in a Narrative Feature	All the Light in the Sky	Won	
2020	Florida Film Critics Circle	Best Supporting Actress	She Dies Tomorrow	Nominated	
2021	Primetime Emmy Awards	Outstanding Guest Actress in a Comedy Series	Hacks (episode: "I Think She Will")	Nominated	
2022	Primetime Emmy Awards	Outstanding Guest Actress in a Comedy Series	Hacks (episode: "The Click")	Nominated	
