= Team Picture =

- Team Picture film poster
- Directed by: Kentucker Audley
- Written by: Kentucker Audley
- Produced by: Brian Takats
- Starring: Andrew Nenninger; Timothy Morton; Amanda Harris; Chellie Bowman; Bill Baker
- Cinematography: Timothy Morton
- Edited by: Kentuker Audley
- Music by: Ben Siler; Kentucker Audley
- Production company: Benten Films
- Distributed by: Benten Films
- Release date: October 10, 2007
- Running time: 62 minutes
- Country: United States
- Language: English

Team Picture is a 2007 mumblecore drama film written and directed by filmmaker Kentucker Audley. The film is a character study of a young man and his relationship with an ambitious girlfriend, his dealings with the familial and societal pressures to go to college, and his considerations of a future as a musician.

The filmmaker was named in August 2007 to Filmmaker Magazine's annual list of "25 New Faces of Independent Film".

== Synopsis ==
Erik (Kentucker Audley) quits his job at his step dad's (Greg Gaston) sporting goods store, mutually breaks up with his girlfriend Jessica (Shawna Wheeler) and meets a new girl Sarah (Amanda Harris). At a crossroads he decides to travel with Sarah to Chicago. His roommate (Timothy Morton) stays in Memphis to lounge at a baby pool in the front yard and perform at coffee shops.

== Cast ==
- Kentucker Audley as David (as Andrew Nenninger)
- Timothy Morton as Eric
- Amanda Harris as Sarah
- Bill Baker as David's dad
- Greg Gaston as David's step dad
- Chellie Bowman as Hilary
- Shawna Wheeler as Jessica
- Terry Hamilton as David's mom
- Dana Terle as Linda
- Cole Weintraub as McTyere

== Release ==
The film premiered at the Indie Memphis Film Festival on October 19, 2007, and was released on DVD by Benten Films on August 26, 2008, containing director commentary, a new epilogue to the film, a short by Audley and deleted scenes.

== Critical reception ==
Michael Atkinson of Independent Film Channel gave a mixed review of the film, summarizing, "Charming as it is, maybe like Jayasundara's film (The Forsaken Land), Team Picture isn't realism but rather a heightened Beckettian void". John Beifuss of Memphis Commercial Appeal praised the film, writing that it was "the richest and most assured local feature in the festival", that it "may represent the most promising feature debut for a Memphis filmmaker", and that the "movie's characters and situations are so recognizable and distressingly funny that they are likely to unnerve viewers who aren't bored by the film's lack of overt drama or puzzled by its home-video esthetic". Conversely, Jennifer Aldoretta of Technique panned the film as "mediocre and borderline terrible", noting only that writer and director Audley was "the only one involved who seems like he actually knew what he was doing." Monika Bartyzel of Cinematical wrote that the film, while "not for moviegoers looking for a fast-paced, tightly written story, Team Picture does have some charm as a sort of dead-pan voyeuristic look into modern slackers." Noel Megahey of DVD Times notes an autobiographical character to the film, noting that the film's lead character is played by the writer-director himself, and compliments by writing "its simple philosophy of taking time to find enjoyment is a sound one and it’s an honest sentiment that arises naturally out of the characters". Nick Dawson of Filmmaker Magazine commented that the film felt intimately real, writing "Nenninger's dialogue is scarily familiar, eschewing overly crafted Hollywood patter for the often comical idiosyncrasies of everyday speech."

== Additional sources ==
- Boston Phoenix, "Notes from underground: Celebrating independents at the HFA"
