= Lawrence Michael Levine =

American actor, writer, and filmmaker (born 1976)

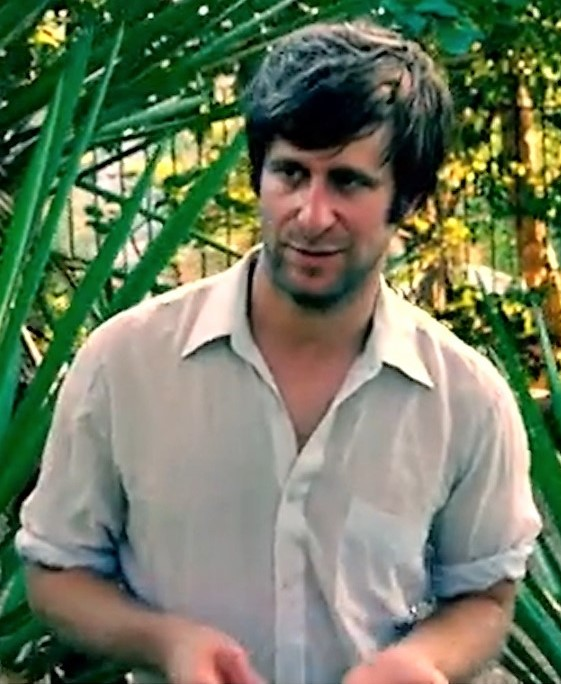
- Levine interviewed about Green in 2011
- Born: 1976 (age 49–50)
- Occupations: Actor, director, editor, producer, writer
- Years active: 2004-present
- Spouse: Sophia Takal

Lawrence Michael Levine (born 1976) is an American actor, writer, and filmmaker, best known for writing and directing the films Gabi on the Roof in July, Wild Canaries, and Black Bear.

== Career ==
In 2005, Levine wrote, produced, and directed his debut film Territory, based on his stage play of the same name. Critic Aaron West of eFilmCritic wrote of the film, "The off-Broadway version is undoubtedly the more appropriate medium for this story, and if given a choice, I would rather see it there. Still, I cannot help but applaud Levine for trying something a little different. His characters are extraordinarily ordinary, and his tightly wound screenplay reveals their (and our) brightest and darkest sides at various times."

In 2009, he wrote and directed the short films The Empress and Fat Friend.

His next film, 2010's romantic drama/comedy Gabi on the Roof in July, received a positive critical response and was praised by Eric Kohn of Indiewire, who called the film a "lightly amusing comedy".

In 2014, Levine wrote, directed, and starred in the mystery/comedy Wild Canaries. The film received a positive response from critics and was praised by The Village Voice as being "...the closest a contemporary film has come to replicating the unbridled jubilance of a classic screwball comedy". His most recent film, Black Bear, stars Christopher Abbott, Sarah Gadon and Aubrey Plaza.

In addition to his own films, Levine has also acted in such pictures as Richard's Wedding, Takal's Green, All the Light in the Sky, and V/H/S/2 (segment "Tape 49"), and appears in the second season of the anthology series Easy.

== Personal life ==
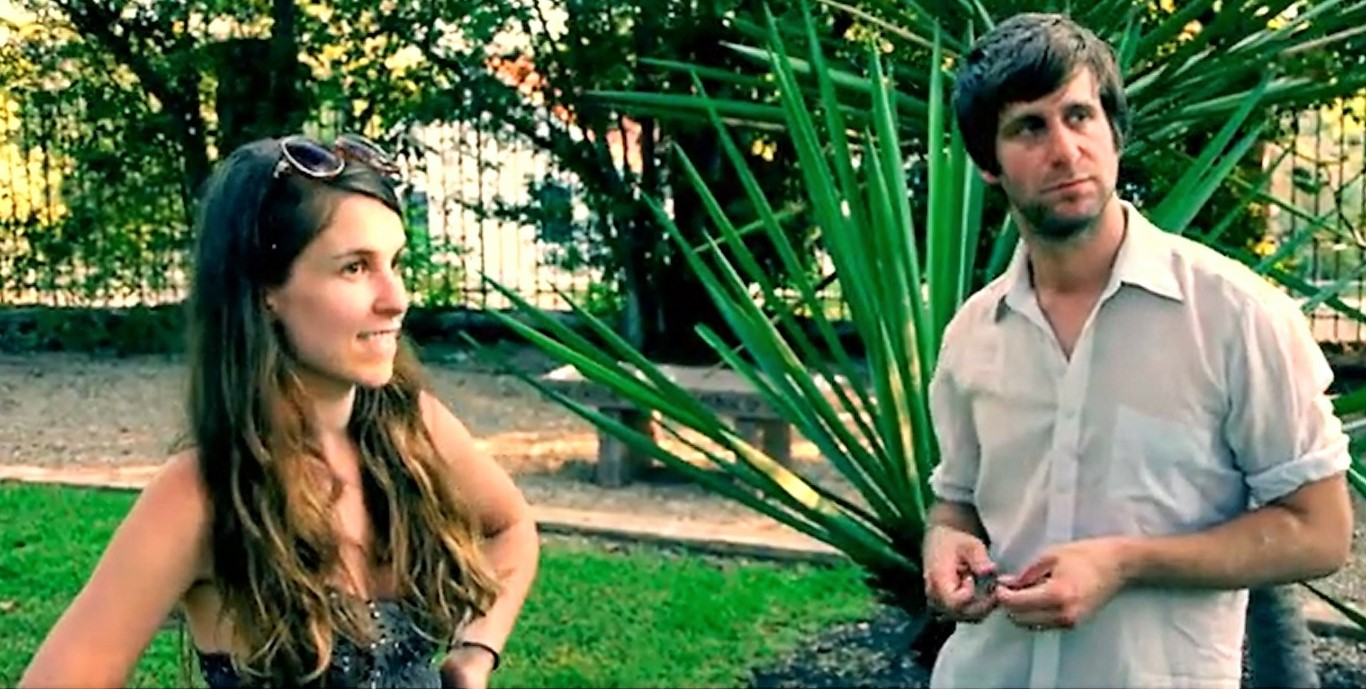
Takal and Levine interviewed in 2011

Levine is married to fellow filmmaker Sophia Takal, with whom he has collaborated on several films. In 2013, Jordan Zakarin of The Hollywood Reporter named Levine and Takal two of New York's next big independent filmmakers.
