= List of University of North Carolina School of the Arts alumni =

This list of alumni of the University of North Carolina School of the Arts includes high school, undergraduate, and graduate, former students of the University of North Carolina School of the Arts. UNCSA offers high school, undergraduate and graduate degrees from the five arts schools of Dance, Design and Production, Drama, Film, and Music.

== Dance ==
- Victor Barbee – principal dancer, American Ballet Theatre 1975–2003
- Elizabeth Benjamin – writer
- Patrick Bissell – principal dancer, American Ballet Theatre
- Tre' Booker – NFL cheerleader, off-Broadway performer
- Camille A. Brown – dancer and choreographer
- Chris Crawford – NFL cheerleader
- Kennedy Davenport – drag queen, best known for RuPaul's Drag Race and RuPaul's Drag Race All Stars
- Paul Frame – corps de ballet, New York City Ballet
- Alicia Holloway – corps de ballet, Dance Theatre of Harlem
- Megan LeCrone – soloist, New York City Ballet
- Gillian Murphy – principal dancer, American Ballet Theatre
- Katy Pyle – artistic director of Ballez
- Margaret Qualley – actress
- Maria Riccetto – soloist, American Ballet Theatre
- Keith Roberts – former principal dancer, American Ballet Theatre
- Celia Rowlson-Hall – choreographer, dancer, and filmmaker
- Mel Tomlinson – soloist with New York City Ballet, principal with Boston Ballet
- Katita Waldo – former principal dancer and ballet master, San Francisco Ballet

== Drama ==
- Brian Jordan Alvarez – actor, English Teacher, Will & Grace, Jane the Virgin
- Jeannetta Arnette – actress
- Dylan Arnold – actor
- Matthew Ashford – actor, Days of Our Lives and other soap operas
- Ryan Ashton – actor, known as Zack Sinnett on The Young and the Restless, director, and screenwriter
- Diedrich Bader – actor
- Susan Batten – actress
- Gary Beach – Tony Award-winning actor, The Producers
- Erich Bergen – actor, Madam Secretary, Jersey Boys
- Ben Best – actor, Eastbound & Down, Superbad
- Neal Bledsoe – actor
- Jacob Brent – actor
- Dave Thomas Brown – actor, Broadway: American Psycho, Book of Mormon (Elder Price), Clueless
- Anna Camp – actress, True Blood, Pitch Perfect, Equus on Broadway
- Josh Clark – stage and screen actor
- Gab Cody – filmmaker and theatre artist
- Natalia Cordova-Buckley – actress, best known as Elena "Yo-Yo" Rodriguez on Agents of S.H.I.E.L.D.
- Cassandra Creech – actress
- Dane DeHaan – actor, Chronicle, Valerian and the City of a Thousand Planets, Life After Beth, The Amazing Spider-Man 2, Oppenheimer
- Dennis Delaney – writer and actor, first national director of Greenpeace USA
- Catherine Dent – actress
- Tempest DuJour – drag queen
- Trieste Kelly Dunn – actress
- Jennifer Ehle – Tony Award-winning actress
- Jennifer Ferrin – actress
- Paloma Garcia-Lee – actress, West Side Story
- Ashley Gardner – voice, stage, screen actress
- Brett Gelman – actor and comedian, The Other Guys, Eagleheart, Stranger Things, named one of 10 comics to watch by Variety
- Chris Grace – actor, Superstore, PEN15, Broad City, This Is Us
- Rhoda Griffis – actress
- Josh Grisetti – Broadway, television and film actor Broadway Bound, The Knights of Prosperity
- Tim Guinee – actor, Tai-Pan, stage, film, television
- Gus Halper – actor known for Law & Order shows
- Lucas Hedges – Oscar-nominated actor, Manchester by the Sea
- Peter Hedges – writer and director
- Stephen Henderson – actor
- Tom Hulce – actor, Amadeus, National Lampoon's Animal House, Tony Award-winning producer of Spring Awakening
- Jana Marie Hupp – actress
- Will Janowitz – actor, writer, director
- Jake Lacy – actor
- Elizabeth Lail – actress, Once Upon a Time
- Katherine LaNasa – Emmy-winning actress
- Matt Lauria – actor, Friday Night Lights, The Chicago Code
- Natalia Livingston – Emmy Award-winning actress, General Hospital
- Jenn Lyon – actress
- Kelly-Anne Lyons – actress
- Anthony Mackie – actor, Half Nelson, The Hurt Locker, and Captain America: The Winter Soldier
- Angus MacLachlan – playwright, screenwriter, and director, Junebug
- Billy Magnussen – Tony Award-nominated actor
- Jonathan Majors – actor, Marvel Cinematic Universe, Lovecraft Country, Creed III, When We Rise
- Terrence Mann – actor, director, singer, dancer, songwriter
- Joe Mantello – Tony Award-winning theatre director
- Krys Marshall – actress
- Marilyn McIntyre – television and film actress
- Cee Cee Michaela – actress
- Julianne Morris – actress
- Glyn O'Malley – playwright, actor, director, professor
- Mary-Louise Parker – Golden Globe, Emmy and Tony Award-winning actress
- Chris Parnell – actor and comedian
- Will Patton – actor, best known as Coach Yoast from Remember the Titans
- Ciera Payton – actress, The Walking Dead, General Hospital, Graceland, and NCIS
- Patsy Pease – actress, best known as Kimberly Brady from Days of Our Lives
- Jada Pinkett Smith – actress
- Isaac Cole Powell – actor, Once on This Island on Broadway
- Missi Pyle – actress, Gone Girl
- Margaret Qualley – actress
- Bridget Regan – actress, stage, film, television, best known as Kahlan Amnell in the television series Legend of the Seeker
- Judge Reinhold – actor
- J. T. Rogers – playwright
- Paul Schneider – actor, Parks and Recreation
- Klea Scott – actress, Millennium
- Nick Searcy – actor, Justified
- Ainsley Seiger – actress, Law & Order: Organized Crime
- Samantha Shelton – actress, singer
- Monti Sharp – Daytime Emmy Award-winning actor, Guiding Light
- Wesley Taylor – actor, Plankton in SpongeBob SquarePants on Broadway
- Berlinda Tolbert – actress, best known for her role as Jenny Willis Jefferson on The Jeffersons
- Lauren Ward – actress
- Celia Weston – actress
- Anna Wood – actress
- Ira David Wood III – actor
- Kurt Yaghjian – actor, starred in Gian Carlo Menotti's opera Amahl and the Night Visitors

== Design and production ==
- Brian Sidney Bembridge – multiple award-winning scenic and lighting designer
- Kevin Dreyer – lighting designer/reconstructor for dance, theatre, opera and film
- Kerry Joyce – Emmy award-winning set decorator, interior designer, and fabric designer
- Elizabeth Power – award-winning writer and educator
- Paul Tazewell – costume designer, winner of a Tony Award for Hamilton, an Emmy Award for NBC’s The Wiz! Live, and an Academy Award for Wicked

== Film ==
- Zene Baker – film editor
- Travis Beacham – screenwriter
- Ryan Butler – documentary filmmaker and attorney
- Mark Freiburger – screenwriter, director and producer
- David Gordon Green – director of Pineapple Express and The Righteous Gemstones
- Brett Haley – writer and director of The Hero, I'll See You in My Dreams, and The New Year
- Chad Hartigan – director of This is Martin Bonner, Morris From America and Little Fish
- Jody Hill – writer and director The Righteous Gemstones, The Foot Fist Way, Eastbound & Down, and Observe and Report
- Aaron Katz – director, screenwriter, and editor, Quiet City, Dance Party USA, Cold Weather
- Danny McBride – actor, comedian, screenwriter, and producer, Pineapple Express, Tropic Thunder, and Eastbound & Down
- Caitlin McHugh – actress, writer, model
- Jeff Nichols – writer and director, Shotgun Stories, Mud, The Bikeriders
- Tim Orr – cinematographer
- Chris Parnell – actor
- Andrew Rakich – filmmaker and YouTuber
- Paul Schneider – actor and filmmaker
- Sage Stallone – actor, film director, film producer, and film distributor
- Martha Stephens – writer, director, filmmaker
- Craig Zobel – writer and director of Great World of Sound; co-creator of Homestar Runner

== Music ==
- Eddie Barbash – saxophonist for The Late Show with Stephen Colbert
- René Barbera – tenor
- Katreese Barnes – musician and songwriter
- Ida Bieler – violinist, professor; founder and Artistic Director of the International String Festival Baden Württemberg
- Gwendolyn Bradley – soprano
- Cameron Carpenter – organist/pianist
- Marc Cary – jazz pianist
- Walter Aaron Clark – musicologist
- Judith Cloud – composer, alto vocalist, and educator
- Ricardo Cobo – classical guitarist, professor
- Richard Cray – singer, actor
- Carlo Curley – organist; organ design and construction
- Nia Franklin – composer, beauty pageant titleholder
- Kenneth Frazelle – composer
- Joseph Genualdi – violinist
- Marc Hoffman – composer, pianist, educator
- Stefan Jezierski – french horn player; high horn with the Berlin Philharmonic for many years; principal horn of the Kassel Staatstheater; played with the Cleveland Orchestra
- Lindsay Jones – Tony Award-nominated composer
- Randy Jones – original Village People cowboy
- Lisa Kim – violinist, New York Philharmonic
- John P. Kee – gospel musician
- Jim Lauderdale – singer/songwriter
- Kendra Preston Leonard – cellist, musicologist
- Bret Mosley – singer/songwriter
- Mary-Jean O'Doherty – opera singer
- Atli Örvarsson – composer, conductor, musician, songwriter
- Sharon Robinson – cellist
- Becca Stevens – singer/songwriter
- Blair Tindall – oboist and author
- Tichina Vaughn – operatic mezzo-soprano
- Ransom Wilson – flutist and conductor
- Sean Yseult – musician

== Visual arts ==
- Matt Fraction – writer, director and producer
- Alexander Isley – graphic designer
- David LaChapelle – photographer and music video director
- Hunter Schafer – visual artist, actress and trans activist

== Faculty ==
- Ida Bieler – violinist, professor
- Lawrence Dillon – composer
- Reena Esmail – media composer
- Kenneth Frazelle – composer
- Vittorio Giannini – composer
- Bob Gosse – film producer, film director, and actor
- Kevin Lawrence – violinist
- Jared Miller – composer
- Robert Ward – Pulitzer Prize-winning composer
