= The Devil Inside (The Vampire Diaries) =

- The Vampire Diaries episode
- Episode no.: Season 5 Episode 12
- Directed by: Kellie Cyrus
- Written by: Brett Matthews; Sonny Postiglione
- Production code: 2J7512
- Original air date: January 30, 2014

Guest appearances
- Olga Fonda (Nadia); Michael Malarkey (Enzo); Shaun Sipos (Aaron)

Episode chronology
← Previous "500 Years of Solitude"	Next → "Total Eclipse of the Heart"
- The Vampire Diaries season 5

"The Devil Inside" is the twelfth episode of the fifth season of the American series The Vampire Diaries and the series' 101st episode overall. "The Devil Inside" originally aired on January 30, 2014, on The CW. The episode was written by Brett Matthews and Sonny Postiglione and directed by Kellie Cyrus.

== Plot ==
The episode starts with Katherine (Nina Dobrev) in Elena's body meeting Matt (Zach Roerig). She reveals to him right away that she is in fact Katherine. She explains that she wants him to tell her everything she should know about Elena so she will be able to pretend being her without anyone noticing. She then compels him to not reveal her secret.

A little earlier that day, Nadia (Olga Fonda) worries that Elena is going to turn up and take over her body and she informs Katherine that they have to make the transfer permanent. To do that, they need her body so she chains Katherine to the bed, in case Elena takes over and escapes, and she goes to the Salvatore house to ask for Katherine's body.

Damon (Ian Somerhalder) get rids of Katherine's body and tells Stefan (Paul Wesley) that Katherine is where she should always be. Nadia shows up demanding the corpse but Damon refuses to tell her where it is so she leaves without getting what she wants. In the meantime, Elena takes over while Nadia is gone and she gets free from the chains. Before she manages to call someone, Nadia comes back and she calls Katherine back. Nadia tells her that she did not manage to take her body back and Katherine says she will go to Tyler's (Michael Trevino) welcome party and find out where Damon buried it.

Aaron (Shaun Sipos) searches for Elena but he finds Caroline (Candice Accola) instead. She offers to take a message for Elena and he tells her that he cut off the funding for the vampire experiments and he apologizes for everything they went through because of the Augustine company. Aaron leaves but when he gets back to his home, Enzo (Michael Malarkey) appears and attacks him.

Stefan tries to get Damon and Elena back together and he asks Caroline's help. Caroline does not want to help him but when Stefan explains her that Elena is good for Damon since she makes him happy and that way he is not walking around killing people, Caroline agrees to help him.

Damon comes home and finds Enzo waiting for him on his couch with Aaron unconscious lying on the floor. When Damon asks him what does he want, Enzo tells him that he brought him the last Whitmore to kill him so the two of them start fresh. Damon tries to explain that he does not want to do it when Aaron wakes up. Enzo pushes Damon to do it but Damon breaks Enzo's neck instead and compels Aaron to leave town and never come back.

At the party, Katherine tries to learn where her body is. Stefan, thinking that she is Elena, tells her that Damon wants her back but she asks him if he knows where Katherine's body is because they should give her a funeral. Stefan says he does not know where the body is but that Damon said "he put her where she was always meant to be" and Katherine figures out where Damon put her body; at the tomb under the church where Damon thought she was all those years.

Katherine tries to say goodbye to everyone before she leaves the party so she can go to the tomb but Caroline wants to talk to her about what happened between her and Klaus (Joseph Morgan). Katherine is shocked hearing the news but when she sees Tyler standing a little far away, she starts talking about it so he can hear her. Tyler gets angry hearing that and he leaves the room leaving Caroline standing there not knowing what to do. She later tries to explain him but he does not let her, reminding her all the horrible things Klaus had done. Caroline does not leave and he shouts her to get out while he is ready to turn into a wolf when Stefan comes in and stops him.

Katherine gets to the tomb where she finds Nadia and the traveler who will cast the spell, along with the body. The traveler starts the process when Elena takes over and sees what is happening. She continues pretending she is Katherine till she figures out what to do. She finally attacks the traveler and Nadia and runs away before they complete the ritual. Nadia tells the traveler to finish the spell anyway, something that she does.

Elena finds Damon but Katherine takes over her body before she manages to tell him what Katherine is doing. Damon tries to get her back telling her that he messed up but Katherine, as Elena, tells him that the two of them are over for good and she walks away. She goes back to the tomb to find Nadia and tells her that she does not want to leave Mystic Falls but stay and get Stefan back.

The episode ends with Enzo and Damon catching up on Aaron who was trying to get out of the town. Aaron tells Damon that he asked him to go away so he will be safe but Damon, after "Elena's" rejection, decided that he has to go back to his evil self and kills him.

== Feature music ==
The following songs were in "The Devil Inside" episode:

- "Tongue Tied" by Grouplove
- "21 Flights" by Heavy English
- "Fa Fa Fa" by Datarock
- "Your Body Is a Weapon" by The Wombats
- "Thunder Clatter" by Wild Cub
- "Bravado" by Lorde
- "I'm a Man" by Black Strobe
- "Illusory Light" by Sarah Blasko
- "Flirting With Thieves" by Heavy English
- "Live in This City" by Dragonette
- "Let Her Go" by Passenger

== Reception ==
=== Ratings ===
In its original American broadcast, "The Devil Inside" was watched by 2.42 million; down by 0.30 from the previous episode.

=== Reviews ===
"The Devil Inside" received positive reviews.

Stephanie Flasher from TV After Dark gave an A+ rate to the episode saying it was great. "It had a very familiar feeling to some of the more memorable episodes of the show’s past. The viewers attention is grabbed right from the start and sucked in for the entire episode. It had a little something for everybody. There was suspense, drama, family, friendship and who can forget heart break, lots of heart break."

Carrie Raisler of The A.V. Club gave an A− rate to the episode saying: "[It] practically explodes onto the screen with unfettered glee and doesn’t let up until the very end. It’s a good time, but more importantly it’s a good story told well, and that’s something that has been sorely missing for a lot of this season" also stating that the reason of the whole thing working so well is Katherine, the new-old "fabulous antagonist" of the show praising Dobrev's acting. She closes her review saying: "It’s character moments like these, moments mixed in with all of the twisty drama and moments that have been few and far between this season, that suddenly make the show feel like it is snapping back into focus again after being in the blurry dark for far too long. With Katherine Pierce as our guide, how could we possibly get lost again?"

Matt Richenthal from TV Fanatic rated the episode with 4.7/5 saying: "If Kat has lived nine lives in her 500 years of being on the run, [The Devil Inside] definitely represented my favorite one" and he also praised Dobrev's acting: "On an acting level, it was a lot of fun to watch Nina Dobrev toggle between Elena and Katherine."

Stephanie Hall of K Site TV gave a good review to the episode. "Coming off last week's special hour and mini-launch board, "The Devil Inside" managed to take what could have been a standard filler episode and turn it into a shining display of the characters' true natures.[...] How many series can essentially get rid of their main character for the foreseeable future and not send the audience into petition mode? Very few, and even with the 99% chance that Elena's coming back, it's a testament not only to the writers' ability to craft daring stories, but also to the strength and likability of the other characters on The Vampire Diaries."

Thedude35 from Bitch Stole My Remote gave a good review to the episode saying that it was solid "...if you can get past the amazing, game-changing stupidity shown by a main character" meaning Elena's decision not to kill the traveler who was making the ritual and instead she run away.

Ashley Dominique of Geeked Out Nation gave a good review to the episode and rated it with a B.
