= I Know What You Did Last Summer (The Vampire Diaries) =

- The Vampire Diaries episode
- Episode no.: Season 5 Episode 1
- Directed by: Lance Anderson
- Written by: Caroline Dries
- Production code: 2J7501
- Original air date: October 3, 2013

Guest appearances
- Hayley Kiyoko (Megan); Marguerite MacIntyre (Sheriff Forbes); Claire Holt (Rebekah); Olga Fonda (Nadia); Rick Worthy (Rudy Hopkins)

Episode chronology
← Previous "Graduation"	Next → "True Lies"
- The Vampire Diaries season 5

"I Know What You Did Last Summer" is the premiere episode of the fifth season of the American series The Vampire Diaries, and the series' 90th episode overall. "I Know What You Did Last Summer" was originally aired on October 3, 2013, on The CW. The episode was written by Caroline Dries and directed by Lance Anderson.

== Plot ==
It is the end of the summer and Elena (Nina Dobrev) and Caroline (Candice Accola) need to get ready for college. Though a bit hesitant, Damon (Ian Somerhalder) says his goodbyes to Elena as she leaves for Whitmore College since neither of them wants to leave each other after their newly started relationship. Jeremy (Steven R. McQueen) stays behind under the guardianship of Damon, who takes Jeremy back to school. No one knows yet that Bonnie (Kat Graham) is dead, except for Jeremy, who sees her and talks to her and also answers everyone's mails and texts that are sent to her. Also no one knows that Silas (Paul Wesley) is not gone and Stefan is at the bottom of the lake.

At college, Elena and Caroline expect Bonnie to join them soon, but they are shocked when an unknown girl named Megan (Hayley Kiyoko) joins their dorm instead of their friend. Caroline does not like the idea of having a stranger staying with them at all and when she discovers that Megan drinks water with vervain, she gets even more nervous because she believes that Megan knows about them and what they are. Elena calms her down and tells her they have to act normal, so they go to the party they were invited to earlier.

At the college party, Megan is killed by a vampire, something that makes Elena and Caroline concerned about their secret and that it may bust open. When the police tells them that Megan committed suicide they worry even more since the police is covering the murder. Elena and Caroline find a picture of Megan where she is with Elena's father.

Back at the Salvatore house, Katherine makes her unwelcoming appearance asking for Damon's help and protection since now that she is human she is vulnerable and she is scared. Damon offers to turn her back into a vampire to get rid of her but she declines his offer since she does not know if that would work after she drank the cure.

Silas makes his appearance at the town square restaurant, where he meets Sheriff Forbes (Marguerite MacIntyre). He tells her that he is not Stefan but Silas. When he realizes she cannot help him, he compels her and leaves. Silas later meets Damon and Jeremy at the bar and Jeremy "feels" that he is not Stefan but rather Silas and tries to convince Damon of it.

Silas goes to the Salvatore house where he finds Katherine and tries to kill her. Katherine manages to escape from him and with the help of Damon and Jeremy leaves town. Damon, convinced that the person he sees is not his brother but Silas, asks Silas to tell him where his brother is. Silas says he will tell him only if he brings Katherine back to him. Damon calls Jeremy to bring Katherine back but Katherine manages to cause an accident and she escapes.

Matt (Zach Roerig) is off having fun traveling with Rebekah (Claire Holt) and meeting new people. Among them is a girl named Nadia (Olga Fonda) who later appears at Mystic Falls. At the end of the episode, Nadia and her partner cast a mysterious spell on Matt who loses his senses.

At the end of summer party in Mystic Falls, the Mayor who is Bonnie's father, Rudy Hopkins (Rick Worthy), is killed by Silas in front of everyone, while Bonnie watches, helpless. Silas influences the crowd to help him find Katherine.

In the meantime, Stefan is still locked in the safe underwater and is hallucinating scenes where he talks to Damon and later to Elena, while he is fighting the urge to turn off his humanity.

== Feature music ==
In the "I Know What You Did Last Summer" episode we can hear the songs:

- "Unbelievers" by Vampire Weekend
- "Royals" by Lorde
- "Falling" by Amy Stroup
- "Pumpin Blood " by NONONO
- "Dreaming" by Smallpools
- "Here We Go Again" by Johnny Stimson
- "Time" by The Fast Romantics
- "Run Away" by Cary Brothers

== Reception ==
=== Ratings ===
"I Know What You Did Last Summer" was watched by 2.59 million American viewers, being the first season premiere of the series not to draw 3 million U.S. viewers.

=== Reviews ===
"I Know What You Did Last Summer" received generally positive reviews.

David Griffin of Screen Rant said that the episode is "another stellar season premiere that doesn’t disappoint" and stated that "The Vampire Diaries has a cruel way of reminding viewers that no character is safe in this world."

Carrie Raisler from The A.V. Club gave a B+ rate to the episode saying: "This wasn’t necessarily a perfect episode of The Vampire Diaries but it feels like the perfect introduction to a season that looks to be filled with changing character dynamics and ever-shifting alliances."

Eric Goldman from IGN rated the episode with a 7.8/10. "What I enjoyed about the premiere is how almost everything we saw actually turned out to be important."

Matt Richenthal from TV Fanatic gave the episode 4.5/5.
