= Cold weather =

Cold weather may refer to:

- Cold wave, a weather phenomenon distinguished by cooling of the air
- Cold Weather, a 2010 American mystery film
