= Keegan DeWitt =

American musician

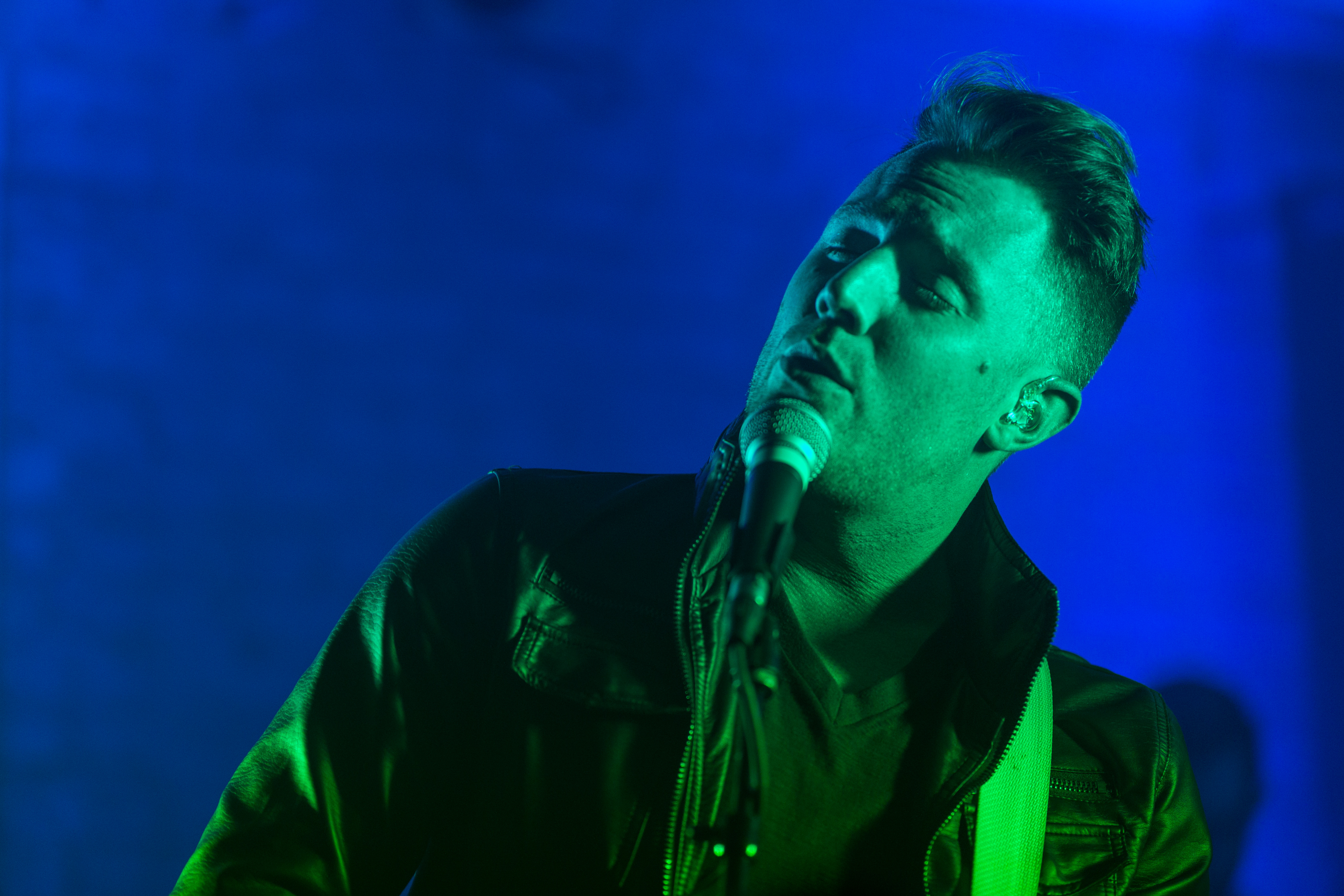
- DeWitt performing with Wild Cub at Lambert's BBQ in 2014

Background information
- Born: April 8, 1982 (age 44); Bend, Oregon, US
- Origin: Portland, Oregon, U.S.
- Occupations: Composer, singer-songwriter, actor
- Years active: 2000–present
- Label: Izumi Records
- Website: www.keegandewitt.com, www.wildcubmusic.com

Keegan DeWitt (born April 8, 1982) is an American film composer, singer-songwriter, and actor. He was raised in Oregon and now resides in Los Angeles. He is the lead singer of the indie rock band Wild Cub, as well as a composer for film scores.

== Early life ==
Keegan was born in Bend, Oregon.

== Film composing career ==
DeWitt stumbled into film composing when his high school best friend Aaron Katz asked him to score Dance Party USA in 2006. The film went on to premiere at the SXSW Film Festival and be named a NY Times Critic's Pick. In 2007 he scored Quiet City for Katz, which was also a NY Times Critic's Pick and Independent Spirit Awards nominee.

DeWitt completed the score for Katz's Cold Weather, which premiered at the 2010 South by Southwest film festival and was bought and released by IFC Films.

In 2013, DeWitt composed the score for Academy Award-winning documentary short film Inocente, directed by Sean & Andrea Fine (War/Dance). In the same year he would also attend the Sundance Film Festival with 2 films. The first, This Is Martin Bonner by Chad Hartigan, was the winner of the NEXT Audience Award, and the second Life According to Sam was produced in conjunction with HBO to air in the fall of '13.

2014 saw DeWitt taking two films to Sundance for a second year in a row. The first, Land Ho! (from executive producer David Gordon Green) reunited him with close friend and director Aaron Katz, alongside Pilgrim Song director Martha Stephens. The second, Listen Up Philip, teamed him with director Alex Ross Perry.

DeWitt premiered two films at the 2015 Sundance Film Festival: Unexpected (dir. Kris Swanberg), which was then released on July 24, 2015, in a limited release and through video on demand by The Film Arcade and I'll See You in My Dreams (dir. Brett Haley). He also premiered his second collaboration with Alex Ross Perry, Queen of Earth, at the 2015 Berlin Film Festival.

In 2016, he composed the soundtrack for the 2017 movie The Hero, starring Sam Elliott, Laura Prepon, Nick Offerman and Katharine Ross.

He has also done commercial work for Facebook, Merrell, Lincoln, Amtrak, Country Time Lemonade, Save The Children and others. He is also known in cycling world for his scores of the viral Rapha Cycling videos.

Often collaborators include: Barry Jenkins, Aaron Katz, Chad Hartigan, Alex Ross Perry, Andrew DeYoung, Sean Fine, Brett Haley, Rapha and others.

== Recording career ==
Most recently, DeWitt has teamed with fellow Nashville, TN artist Jeremy Bullock to form Wild Cub. They released their debut 13-song full length LP in August 2013 (January 2014 UK release) entitled "Youth". Their sophomore 11-song LP "Closer" was released in 2017. Wild Cub has been part of SXSW, Bonnaroo, CMJ and other prominent festivals and has received coverage from PASTE, MTVHive.com, Wall Street Journal, SPIN, IFC.com, RCRDLBL, The Line of Best Fit(UK), Clash Music (UK) and more.

While working as an actor and composer in New York, DeWitt also began working as a performing songwriter in New York's Lower East Side. During this time he was developing demos and recording regularly with Roman Candle, a band featuring his sister Timshel, as well as her husband Skip Matheny and his younger brother Logan Matheny (also of The Rosebuds) on drums.

In 2010, Keegan released Nothing Shows under the Daytrotter label. Paste named him one of the 10 best solo artists of 2010 as well as Best of What's Next.

Keegan's "Two Hearts" is the theme song to MTV's Friendzone series

He has songs featured in How I Met Your Mother, Hart of Dixie, and Revenge as a solo artist. His song "Say La La" was featured on a JC Penney and Joe Fresh ad during the 2013 Oscars telecast. He also composed the score for Facebook Watch original series "Sorry for Your Loss".

== Discography ==
=== Film scores ===
- Dance Party USA (2006)
- Quiet City (2007)
- Luke and Brie Are on a First Date (2008)
- Cold Weather (2010)
- No Matter What (2011)
- Country Story (2011)
- This is Martin Bonner (2013)
- Life According to Sam (2013)
- Land Ho! (2014)
- Listen Up Philip (2014)
- Koinonia (2014)
- Unexpected (2015)
- I'll See You in My Dreams (2015)
- Queen of Earth (2015)
- Morris from America (2016)
- Kate Plays Christine (2016)
- Hunter Gatherer (2016)
- The Hero (2017)
- Golden Exits (2017)
- Gemini (2017)
- The Long Dumb Road (2018)
- Hearts Beat Loud (2018)
- Making Babies (2018)
- Her Smell (2018)
- Human Nature (2019)
- Let It Snow (2019)
- All the Bright Places (2020)
- A Teacher (2020)
- All Together Now (2020)
- Little Fish (2020)
- Chestnut (2023)
- The Gutter (2024)
- Snack Shack (2024)
- Girl Haunts Boy (2024)
- Friendship (2024)
- The Threesome (2025)
- Moonglow (2026)
