= True Lies (The Vampire Diaries) =

- The Vampire Diaries episode
- Episode no.: Season 5 Episode 2
- Directed by: Joshua Butler
- Written by: Brian Young
- Production code: 2J7502
- Original air date: October 10, 2013

Guest appearances
- Marguerite MacIntyre (Sheriff Forbes); Rick Worthy (Rudy Hopkins); Olga Fonda (Nadia); Rick Cosnett (Professor Wes Maxfield); Kendrick Sampson (Jesse)

Episode chronology
← Previous "I Know What You Did Last Summer"	Next → "Original Sin"
- The Vampire Diaries season 5

"True Lies" is the second episode of the fifth season of the American series The Vampire Diaries, and the series 91st episode overall. "True Lies" was originally aired on October 10, 2013, on The CW. The episode was written by Brian Young and directed by Joshua Butler.

== Plot ==
The whole town is under the influence of Silas (Paul Wesley) to find Katherine (Nina Dobrev). A woman sees her on the street but Katherine hits her so she will not call Silas. Matt (Zach Roerig) and Jeremy (Steven R. McQueen) find her before she runs away again and capture her to hide her from everyone so Silas will not find her.

Elena and Caroline (Candice Accola) try to get close to the Biology professor, Wes Maxfield (Rick Cosnett), to find out what he knows since he was the one who covered the real cause of death of Megan. However, they do not have much luck in his class.

Silas visits Elena at the college, who still does not know that Stefan is Silas, and he tricks her to tell him where Jeremy might be. Before he leaves he compels her to kill Damon (Ian Somerhalder) who also came to the college the moment he found out that Silas was there. Elena gets alone with Damon and she forces him to drink vervain to weaken him. She then ties him up so she can kill him. Damon realizes that she is under Silas's influence and he tries to make her fight it and also tells her the whole truth about Stefan and Silas.

In the meantime, Elena is with Jesse (Kendrick Sampson) who tells her that there is a rumor that Professor Maxfield is a member of a secret group in college but no one knows what that really is. Later, before Elena leaves school temporarily to find Stefan, she has a mysterious conversation with Professor Maxfield, about her father.

Silas, with Elena's directions, tracks down Jeremy, Matt and Katherine. He kills Matt after he realizes that he hosts a traveler in his body. He fights with Jeremy and Katherine comes back to help by shooting Silas. Meanwhile, Matt is on the other side while waiting for the ring to bring him back to life, where he sees Bonnie (Kat Graham). Bonnie tells him all the truth about her being dead but he does not remember any of these when he comes back to life.

After Silas is shot, it is shown that he needs to feed. He encounters the two travelers who are chasing him and while the man tells him that they want to put him back in the tomb, the woman, Nadia (Olga Fonda), kills her partner and says that she has her own agenda.

At the end of the episode, Damon and Elena, with Sheriff Forbes (Marguerite MacIntyre), help find the safe that Stefan is locked in; however, when they open it, instead of Stefan they find a dead man who appears to have been fed on by a vampire.

== Featured music ==
These songs are heard in the "True Lies" episode:

- "Don't Give Up" by Ferras
- "Better Life" by Paper Route
- "Burn" by Ellie Goulding
- "Say Now" by The Rival
- "This Moment Now" by Tyrone Wells
- "Don't Deserve You" by Plumb.

== Reception ==
=== Ratings ===
In its original American broadcast, "True Lies" was watched by 2.14 million; down 0.45 from the previous episode.

=== Reviews ===
Matt Richenthal from TV Fanatic gave the episode 4.2/5 and called it: "an utter blast for this first-year college student!".

Carrie Raisler from The A.V. Club gave a B rate to the episode. "The thing the show figured out a long time ago is precisely how to make a blatant “shifting puzzle pieces” episode fully entertaining as its own, independent episode of television. “True Lies” is an excellent example of exactly this; a mostly inconsequential episode focused on moving a bunch of plots ever-so-slightly forward, while having a hell of a good time doing it."

Stephanie Flasher from TV After Dark gave an A rate to the episode and stated that it was amazing and filled with twists and turns. "Taking the supernatural drama back to the very core that makes TVD so great, It was filled with suspense, drama, action, romance and even comedy. It really had something for everyone. Taking it’s [sic] viewers on a roller coaster ride of emotions, it was filled with twists and turns."

Chaya from Leaky News said that the episode was "heavy plot" but "extremely entertaining". "This is what TVD does best. It throws plot at us and sneaks in the emotional bits like individually wrapped chocolates. For the first time in a while (since the middle of Season 4) I am dying to know what happens next."

Alyse Wax of Fear Net said that the show is "consistently awesome". 'Craziness happens, and not only is it totally believable in this setting, you just want more. I love that we are in the fifth season and the show rarely feels repetitive... and we are only two episodes in to the season, but it feels like we never left."

The reviewer thedude35 of Bitch Stole My Remote stated that "Even though [the episode] is seriously lacking in suspense, the second episode of The Vampire Diaries seems to be finding its groove and get this fifth season off to a pretty steady start."
