= Total Eclipse of the Heart (The Vampire Diaries) =

- The Vampire Diaries episode
- Episode no.: Season 5 Episode 13
- Directed by: Darren Genet
- Written by: Rebecca Sonnenshine; Holly Brix
- Production code: 2J7513
- Original air date: February 6, 2014

Guest appearances
- Olga Fonda (Nadia); Michael Malarkey (Enzo); Rick Cosnett (Wes Maxfield); Caitlin McHugh (Sloane); Penelope Mitchell (Liv Parker); Shaun Sipos (Aaron); Christopher Marrone (Joey)

Episode chronology
| ← Previous "The Devil Inside" | Next → "No Exit" |
- The Vampire Diaries season 5

"Total Eclipse of the Heart" is the 13th episode of the fifth season of the American series The Vampire Diaries and the series' 102nd episode overall. "Total Eclipse of the Heart" was originally aired on February 6, 2014, on The CW. The episode was written by Rebecca Sonnenshine and Holly Brix and directed by Darren Genet.

== Plot ==
The episode starts with Katherine (Nina Dobrev) writing in her diary about how great her life is now with everyone thinking that she is Elena (Nina Dobrev) and she thinks of how to win Stefan (Paul Wesley) back. Caroline (Candice Accola), Bonnie (Kat Graham) and "Elena" are back to college and Caroline wants them to celebrate single life by going to the Bitter Ball. Elena agrees while Bonnie notices a girl next to her magically spinning her pen before Caroline and Elena calls her to answer if she is also going to the Ball.

Stefan finds Aaron's (Shaun Sipos) body in their home driveway and demands from Damon (Ian Somerhalder) to explain what is going on. Damon says that he just wanted to get rid of the Whitemores for good and then Enzo (Michael Malarkey) shows up saying that it was his idea and asks if Stefan knows where Dr. Wes (Rick Cosnett) might be because he is next on the list. Stefan warns Enzo to stay away from his brother later on, when Enzo tries to bury Aaron's body otherwise he will kill him but Enzo does not seem to listen.

Wes is at a laboratory to continue with his research even though he does not have his sponsor (Aaron) anymore. He has a new man named Joey (Christopher Marrone) chained up that he is turned into a vampire. Joey asks what is going on and Wes informs him about his transformation and that he will train him how to feed on other vampires. A woman, Sloane (Caitlin McHugh) gets into the room and offers Wes a new funding for his research. Sloane tells Wes that Aaron is probably dead and he is next and she gives him some blood to analyze.

Stefan calls Elena to tell her about Enzo and Damon but Katherine has no idea who Enzo is. Katherine invites Stefan to the Ball to talk about it there and they hang up. Katherine texts Nadia (Olga Fonda) to ask her to find out about Enzo from Matt (Zach Roerig). Nadia is at the bar where Matt works and the moment she gets the text from Katherine, Tyler (Michael Trevino) shows up. Tyler is suspicious about Nadia being there but Matt reassures him that she is fine. The three of them start drinking shots and at the moment Tyler leaves, Nadia compels Matt to tell her about Enzo. Tyler hears the conversation from across the bar.

Back at the college, Bonnie tells Jeremy (Steven R. McQueen) about the Ball when Damon appears to ask for Bonnie's help about a locator spell. Bonnie reminds him that she is not a witch anymore. Damon and Enzo kidnap Jeremy and threatened to kill him to make her find them a witch who can make the spell. Bonnie agrees to help and she tries to find the girl she saw earlier in class spinning the pen.

Stefan arrives at the Ball right after Katherine gets a text from Nadia about who is Enzo. Stefan and Katherine dance while he tells her that Damon is into some bad stuff but she does not seem surprised or caring. Caroline appears as they dance and takes her away with an excuse, something that makes Katherine wonder if Caroline has feelings for Stefan. She calls Nadia to ask her find out from Matt.

Tyler tries to warn Matt that Nadia compels him and he only believes him when he notices that he is not wearing his vervain bracelet anymore. Matt drinks some vervain and when Nadia asks him about Caroline and Stefan, he answers pretending he is compelled. When Nadia leaves, Tyler comes to ask Matt what she asked him but the moment Matt is going to tell him, Nadia comes back and snaps Tyler's neck.

Damon and Bonnie come to the dance and run into Stefan and Caroline and Damon tells them that Bonnie is helping him find a witch to find Wes. Caroline tells him to let Bonnie go but Bonnie informs Stefan and Caroline that Enzo holds Jeremy as a hostage and he will kill him if she does not help them. She shows them a photo of Jeremy being tied when Katherine approaches. She pretends to be panicked and rushes away looking upset. She later comes back to beg Stefan to help her find Jeremy.

Bonnie finds Liv (Penelope Mitchell) asking for her help. Liv acts like she does not know what Bonnie is talking about until Bonnie tells her she knows she is a witch. Liv cannot help because she does not know how to do spells and Bonnie says she will help her by showing her how to do the locator spell. In the middle of the spell, Liv says she cannot do it because she cannot control her power and she does not want to hurt anyone. Enzo calls to ask what is taking so long and tells them that he will kill Jeremy soon.

Bonnie convinces Liv to try again while in the meantime, Enzo informs Jeremy that Bonnie is failing and he tries to kill him. Stefan and Katherine rush in where Enzo and Jeremy are and while Stefan fights Enzo, Katherine tries to revive Jeremy. Damon shows up saying that the spell worked and he knows where Wes is. Damon and Enzo head out and Stefan tells Damon not to bother coming back.

Later, Stefan admits to Katherine that since the first moment she (Elena) and Damon got together he was waiting and hoping for Damon to screw it up so that he can have her back but he stopped waiting when he figured out that he loved that Damon and he did not want to lose him. Katherine tells him that she will not go back to Damon but she will help him save him.

Tyler wakes up and asks Matt about Nadia. Matt tries to convince him that it was a misunderstanding but Tyler warns him to stay away from her. When Tyler leaves, Matt gets in the car where Nadia is waiting. She tells Matt that if Tyler follows them, she will kill them both. Matt figures out what Nadia and Katherine did and that she is now in Elena's body.

Damon and Enzo arrive at the place, where Wes is, and suddenly, they are surrounded by travelers, who are chanting and causing them pain, while Wes injects Damon with something. Damon and Enzo wake up later, alone and Damon tells Enzo about Wes' plan to have vampires feed on each other. They hear a noise and they try to find out from where it comes. Damon finds Joey and frees him, but when he smells his blood, he attacks him and eventually kills him. Enzo tells him to stop but when he does not, he realizes that Damon's craving for vampire blood is going to be a problem.

== Feature music ==
In the "Total Eclipse of the Heart" episode we can hear the songs:

- "Best Day of My Life" by American Authors
- "Lady in Waiting" by U.S. Royalty
- "I Want It All" by Jules Larson
- "It Ain't Over" by The Rivals
- "Female Robbery" by The Neighbourhood
- "Love Me Again" by John Newman
- "Background" by Barcelona
- "Say Something" by A Great Big World feat. Christina Aguilera

== Reception ==
=== Ratings ===
In its original American broadcast, "Total Eclipse of the Heart" was watched by 2.16 million; down by 0.26 from the previous episode.

=== Reviews ===
Stephanie Flasher of TV After Dark gave a B+ to the episode saying that it was a pretty good one. "Nice to see the entire cast in an episode again. It had a good plot with a nice pace and great acting."

Carrie Raisler of The A.V. Club gave a B rate to the episode saying: "The best thing about these past few episodes since Katherine dumped Damon is that the show finally feels like it is about vampires again. A good vampire show needs one vamp that is evil and just a bit off his or her rocker. For a long time on The Vampire Diaries, Klaus took over this role while Stefan and Damon bothered themselves with winning Elena’s heart. When Klaus left, that left a big evil vampire hole in the middle of the show. With Damon back to his more diabolical ways—especially now that he’s best buddies with the decidedly menacing Enzo and has been altered to feed on other vampires—that hole feels like it might finally be filled again."

Ashley Dominique from Geeked Out Nation gave a B rate to the episode. ""Total Eclipse of the Heart" moved the Augustine Project plot forward in an interesting way, but only Tyler seems to realize something shady is up with Katherine and Nadia."

Shannon Vestal of Buzzsugar gave a good review to the episode saying that Katherine wins this week.

Crystal Bell from Wetpaint gave a good review to the episode saying that the show got its mojo back. "After getting off to a fast and furious start, TVD started to fall into a lull somewhere between doppelgangers and Travelers. But "Total Eclipse of the Heart" put TVD back on track."

Leigh Raines from TV Fanatic rated the episode with 3/5 saying that recycling storylines might not be good for the show. "[Total Eclipse of the Heart] brought us a lot of what we've already seen before. Will it continue to be enough to keep viewers enticed? You decide."

Stephanie Hall of K Site TV stated: "As a viewer, “Total Eclipse of the Heart” was an enjoyable watch, filled with compelling character drama like last week, but as a critic, it was lacking in substance, presenting little new material for us to ponder."
