= 500 Years of Solitude =

- The Vampire Diaries episode
- Episode no.: Season 5 Episode 11
- Directed by: Chris Grismer
- Written by: Julie Plec; Caroline Dries
- Production code: 2J7511
- Original air date: January 23, 2014

Guest appearances
- David Anders as John Gilbert; Sara Canning as Jenna Sommers (special appearance by); Matt Davis as Alaric Saltzman (special appearance by); Kayla Ewell as Vicki Donovan (special appearance by); Daniel Gillies as Elijah Mikaelson (special appearance by); Claire Holt as Rebekah Mikaelson (special appearance by); Bianca Lawson as Emily Bennett (special appearance by); Joseph Morgan as Niklaus Mikaelson (special appearance by); Marguerite MacIntyre as Elizabeth Forbes; Olga Fonda as Nadia Petrova

Episode chronology
← Previous "Fifty Shades of Grayson"	Next → "The Devil Inside"
- The Vampire Diaries season 5

"500 Years of Solitude" is the eleventh episode of the fifth season of the American television supernatural teen drama The Vampire Diaries and the series' 100th episode overall. "500 Years of Solitude" originally aired on January 23, 2014, on The CW. The episode was written by Julie Plec and Caroline Dries, and directed by Chris Grismer.

The episode revolves around Katherine Pierce, who is on her death bed, and her daughter's efforts to keep her alive. To celebrate the 100th episode milestone, characters/actors who either left the show or died in the series returned for a special appearance. Those actors are David Anders as John Gilbert, Sara Canning as Jenna Sommers, Matt Davis as Alaric Saltzman, Kayla Ewell as Vicki Donovan, Daniel Gillies as Elijah Mikaelson, Claire Holt as Rebekah Mikaelson, Bianca Lawson as Emily Bennett and Joseph Morgan as Niklaus Mikaelson.

== Plot ==
The episode starts with a flashback to 1490 Bulgaria where Katherine (Nina Dobrev) gave birth to her daughter, Nadia. Katherine's father took Nadia away from her right after she was born.

Present day: Katherine is at the hospital after the heart attack she had suffered. Stefan (Paul Wesley) is there with her and when Nadia (Olga Fonda) comes, he informs her that he compelled the doctors so he can take Katherine back home to be more comfortable.

At the Salvatore house, Damon (Ian Somerhalder), Jeremy (Steven R. McQueen), Matt (Zach Roerig), Caroline (Candice Accola), Bonnie (Kat Graham) and Elena have a drinking game celebrating Katherine's upcoming death, naming the worst things she has ever done to them. Stefan walks in, asking them to stop because they are being insensitive. He instead drinks to the survivor Katherine rather than the evil one.

Matt goes to get more liquor when Nadia shows up and knocks him down. She then goes back to the house where everyone is gathered and tells them that she found a way to save her mother but she needs some help. When they deny to help her, she says that she imagined what their answer would be and that is why she has buried Matt somewhere alive and she took his Gilbert ring. If they want to find him they should help her.

Stefan and Elena follow Nadia to an abandoned house. On their way there, Nadia tells them her plan of how she will save Katherine. Katherine is born in a traveler bloodline and she can become one by getting into someone else's body; that is, if someone teaches her how to do the spell. Nadia is willing to give up her body to save her mother. When they reach the abandoned house, they find many travelers there and Nadia tells Elena and Stefan that the travelers asked for the doppelgangers but she does not know what for. She leaves, leaving behind Stefan and Elena. The travelers cast a spell, keeping the two of them from escaping and they get one bucket of blood from each of them, for unknown reasons, and then they let them go.

Meanwhile, Caroline, Bonnie and Jeremy try to find out where Matt is. While searching, Caroline finds out about Bonnie and Jeremy's relationship and then they split up to continue the searching. While Caroline shouts out for Matt, Klaus (Joseph Morgan) appears. He informs her that he is back because Damon told him Katherine was dying but Caroline wants to know if he killed Tyler (Michael Trevino). He says that he did not and when Klaus mentions her break up with Tyler, she tells him that he chose revenge over her. Klaus wants to know if she would give him the same choice she gave to Tyler but Caroline tries to avoid the question saying that she is looking for her missing friend. He reassures her that Matt is fine since he heard his calls and a rescuer is on the way to get him out. While Caroline and Klaus talk, Matt opens the safe and he sees Rebekah (Claire Holt).

Klaus promises Caroline that he will leave Mystic Falls and never bother her again if she will confess her feelings about him and be honest. After that promise, Caroline kisses him and the two of them have sex before Caroline goes back to the Salvatore house.

Back at the house, Katherine remembers the time when Klaus killed her entire family because she ran away from him. Damon gets into her mind to torture her and tells her that it's her fault that her family was killed. He also makes her see Aunt Jenna (Sara Canning) and John Gilbert (David Anders). Jenna stabs her and John cuts her fingers off, things that the two of them suffered while being alive because of her. Then, Elijah (Daniel Gillies) appears to save her, but when he sits next to her his face turns into Damon's, who apologizes to her about it not being real. That is when Nadia appears and snaps Damon's neck to stop him from torturing her mother.

Nadia asks Katherine to say the spell so she can get into her body and save her life but Katherine declines saying that she had a full life and it is time for her to go. Nadia leaves and Damon wakes up having heard though the conversation between mother and daughter. Stefan walks in asking what happened and Damon informs him that he was messing with Katherine's mind all day. He asks Damon to leave and Stefan sits with Katherine and tells her that she deserves to find peace. He gets into her mind and he changes her memories from 1492. Her family is not dead and she has her little baby girl. He leaves the room while Elena comes in to say her goodbye.

Stefan and Damon, before they join the rest at the living room, have a brother-to-brother talk at the roof where Stefan asks Damon not to give up on Elena and try his best to get her back. Everyone else, except Elena, is in the living room waiting for Katherine to die. While waiting, Bonnie answers Matt's question that as the anchor to the other side she sees many people including his sister Vicki (Kayla Ewell) who appears to tell him via Bonnie that she loves him and is always watching over him. Tyler also comes back, making Caroline upset after the moment she had with Klaus in the woods. Alaric (Matt Davis) appears last to inform everyone that he is always there.

The episode ends with Elena and Katherine in the bedroom. Elena tells Katherine she forgives her for everything she has done, and while Katherine thanks her, she grabs Elena and chants the spell Nadia taught her. Elena falls to the floor, Katherine faints and Elena's phone starts to ring. Elena wakes up and answers it. It is Nadia who asks if it worked and Katherine (via Elena's body) says that it did. She hangs up the phone, walks over to a mirror and says: "Hi, I am Elena Gilbert".

== Featured music ==
"500 Years of Solitude" included several song placements:

- "Let Her Go" by Passenger
- "Illusory Light" by Sarah Blasko
- "Come Save Me" by Jagwar Ma
- "Love Don't Die" by The Fray

== Reception ==
=== Ratings ===
In its original American broadcast, "500 Years of Solitude" was watched by 2.72 million; up by 0.28 from the previous episode.

=== Reviews ===
"500 Years of Solitude" received positive reviews.

Stephanie Flasher from TV After Dark gave an A+ rate to the episode saying that it was one to remember. "It had many of the things TVD fans know and have grown to love about the supernatural drama. There was a little something for everyone whether a fan from the very first episode or season 2. The episode fit with the current season’s story-lines while still having that nostalgic feeling viewers expect from a milestone episode. It even included a few familiar faces and events that’d probably only ever happen because it was the 100th episode and a service to the fans."

Carrie Raisler from The A.V. Club gave a B+ rate to the episode saying: "The result [of the episode] is a little awkward at times but certainly well-intentioned, and the whole episode comes across as nothing if not a love letter to all of these characters and actors the fans have loved over the years." She also stated that the writers did the smartest thing by focusing the episode on Katherine and she closes her review: "Either way it ends up shaking out, it was a fun moment in an episode full of them, in a series defined by them. The 100th episode of The Vampire Diaries might not be perfect, but it’s fun and warm and exciting, and a great example of why the show is so beloved."

Emma Fraser from Screenfad gave the episode an A− rate saying that in this episode the show wend old school. "...there was no Whitmore College mystery or experiments this week. Instead they go old school and feature pretty much every important character from the first four seasons focusing on the life and times of Katherine Pierce as she lies on her death bed."

Ashley Dominique of Geeked Out Nation gave an A− rate to the episode saying that the episode is a reminder of why people love the show. "For a 100th episode, it could have packed in a bit more punch, but I don’t have much to complain about. They kept the story moving forward and managed to drop another bombshell. [...] Negativity aside, the episode left me full of smiles and excited to see what is next to come for the characters."

Liane Bonin Starr of HitFix gave a good review to the episode saying: "It was all kind of a perfect 100th episode, and a tear jerker at that. [...] The 100th episode seemed like a fitting send-off to a flawed and interesting character [Katherine] we've grown to, if not love, appreciate as a reliable troublemaker. Best of all, lots of dearly departed characters popped in, either as Katherine's hallucinations or courtesy of Bonnie's anchor status."

Eric Goldman from IGN rated the episode with 8.5/10. "In a season that has felt less focused than others, The Vampire Diaries' 100th episode stood out as a fitting and appreciated tribute to the show's history and all that has occurred. I can't help wishing the big twist was even bigger, considering what this show has pulled off in the past, but overall, this was a heartfelt celebration episode... involving a lot of dead people."

Stephanie Hall of K Site TV gave a good review to the episode saying: "'500 Years of Solitude' reminded us all of many of the reasons we've screamed or gasped at our televisions during the past four and a half seasons of The Vampire Diaries and even gave us the chance to for new exclamations. While the 100th episode served more as a stroll down memory lane than a whole story in itself, it still managed to propel the series forward and set up an exciting challenge for the characters to face next."

Christopher Monigle from Starpulse also gave a good review to the episode saying that it was the best episode of the season. "It celebrated what fans love most about the series. Despite recent missteps and a general sense of no direction, The Vampirie Diaries has been great fun to watch over the last five years. Plec and Dries told an awesome Katherine story and utilized every character worth a darn."

Crystal Bell from Wetpaint gave a good review to the episode and she praised Dobrev's acting. "The 100th episode of The Vampire Diaries was packed with emotions — from the sheer joy of seeing old faces return, to the excitement of scandalous new hookups, and the utter shock at the realization that some people, especially Katherine, never change. But, what '500 Years of Solitude' accomplished most of all was bringing back the show we fell in love with. The dramatic hour was a return to form for TVD — and here's hoping it keeps up the momentum."

Catriona Wightman from Digital Spy named the episode "a love letter to the fans" and even though there was the big twist at the end, it was the cameos that made her giggle and even tear up. She also praised Dobrev's acting by saying: "...seeing Katherine look in the mirror and do 'Elena's' voice was absolutely thrilling. That Nina Dobrev can make this such a startling moment is testament to her skill - she's actually now playing her doppelganger in her own body, which is mind-warping. I can't help but be impressed by her."

Caroline Preece of Den of Geek gave another good review to the episode saying that it was a fantastic milestone episode. "This was everything a 100th episode should be, from the ghost party at the end to the focus on Katherine and the brief return of the Originals to Mystic Falls. I went into the hour expecting it to be a cheap farewell episode to the show’s best character – aka a bad decision – but instead we got a solid hour of Vampire Diaries that celebrated everything we’ve always loved about it."

Despite the general positive reviews, Matt Richenthal of TV Fanatic rated the episode with only 2/5 saying that overall he was very disappointed and things were repetitive. "The hour was too reliant on returns, on random actions and on a body takeover storyline we've seen played out over and over and over and over." He also criticized the storyline of Caroline and Klaus stating: "It felt forced, shoved in merely to make Klaroline shippers happy and to create an obstacle for Caroline and Tyler down the line."
