= Wild Cub =

American indie rock band

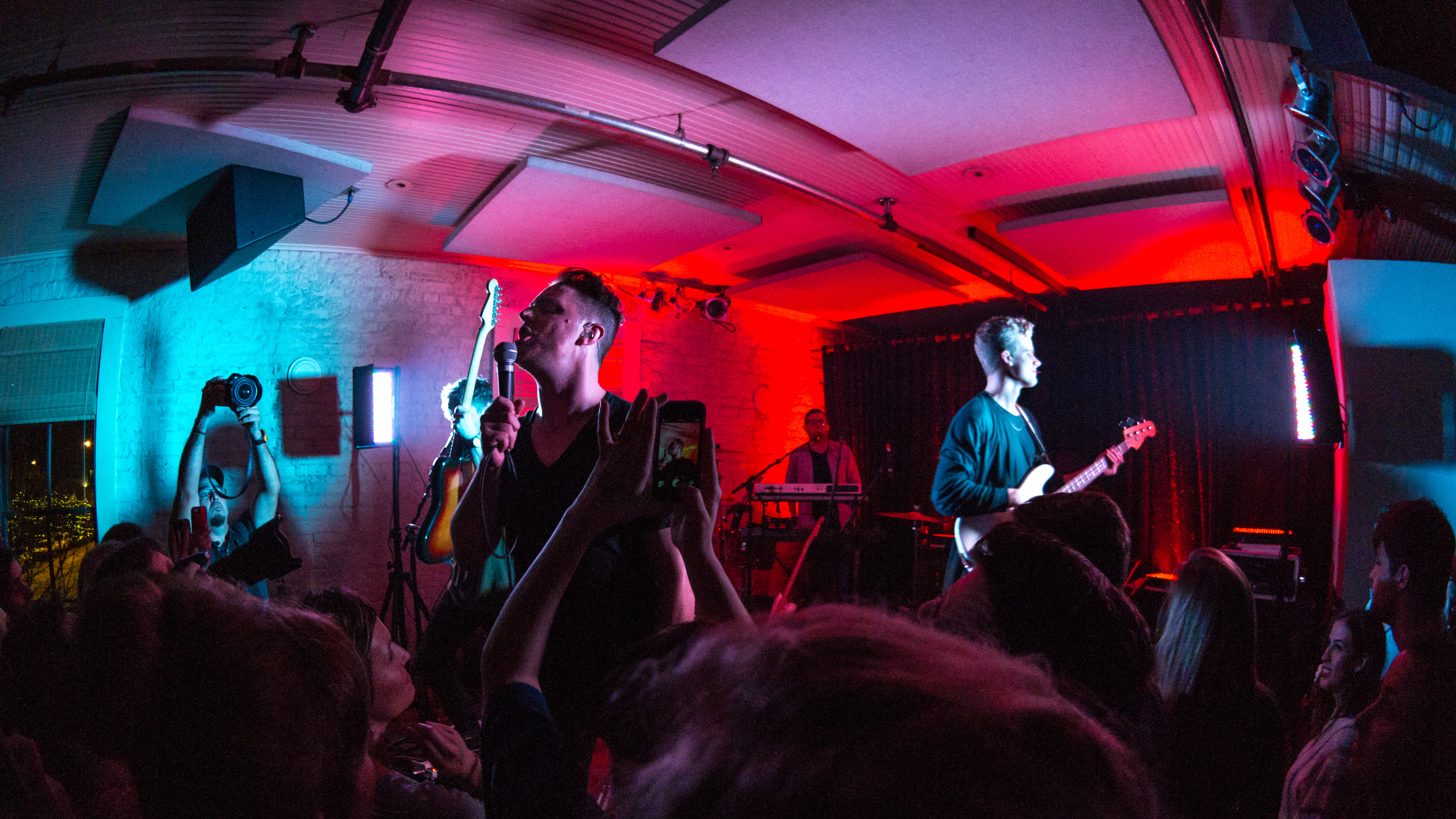
- Wild Cub performing in 2014

Background information
- Origin: Nashville, Tennessee, United States
- Genres: Indie rock, pop
- Years active: 2011–present
- Labels: Big Light Recordings; Mom + Pop Music
- Members: Keegan DeWitt; Jeremy Bullock; Dabney Morris; Harry West; Eric Wilson

Wild Cub is an American indie rock band led by songwriter-composer Keegan DeWitt and multi-instrumentalist Jeremy Bullock. Its supporting members are drummer Dabney Morris, bassist Harry West, and keyboardist and synthesist Eric Wilson. Their song "Thunder Clatter" charted at No. 59 in the UK in August 2013.

== History ==
=== Formation ===
Tired of life in Brooklyn, New York, DeWitt declined a promotion and instead resigned from his job in 2008 and moved to Nashville, Tennessee to concentrate on music. In a 2010 interview, DeWitt stated that he moved because "in Brooklyn, the price of living was such that you'd have to be working a full time job, and I found myself putting 50% effort into both that job and my music. Nashville allowed me to put 100% of my effort into music." For a number of years, he wrote film scores. He collaborated with director Aaron Katz on Dance Party USA, Cold Weather, and Quiet City. The last two were selected as New York Times Critics Picks.

In Nashville DeWitt met multi-instrumentalist Jeremy Bullock, who had previously collaborated with Madi Diaz and Pico vs. Island Trees, and the two founded Wild Cub with Morris, West, and Wilson in early 2012.

=== Youth ===
The group's 13-song debut album Youth was self-released in January 2013 via Big Light Recordings; a deluxe version of the album with two new tracks was released on January 21, 2014, via Mom + Pop Music. Recorded in Bullock's home, it was well received in the UK and the US; Scott Kerr of AllMusic called it "jubilant, '80s-inspired synth pop and infectious". The lead single, "Thunder Clatter", was given a positive review by AllMusic but did not chart until August 2013, after it was used in a Bose commercial; it eventually reached number 59 on the UK Singles Chart.

=== Recent events ===
Wild Cub's remix of "Symptoms" by Atlas Genius appeared on their 2013 remix album So Electric: When It Was Now (The Remixes).

Wild Cub has performed at SXSW, Bonnaroo, CMJ and other prominent festivals. In January 2014, they performed "Thunder Clatter" on Late Night with Jimmy Fallon and in April 2014 they performed on Conan. In addition, they performed a version of "Crazy in Love" in June 2014 for The A.V. Club's A.V. Undercover series.

As of 2017 both Dewitt and Bullock transitioned to the film and TV industry as composers. Their original compositions appeared in 2017 Heart Beats Loud and 2018 Bombshell: The Hedy Lamarr Story, the latter which premiered at the Tribeca Film Festival. Bullock also composed an episode of the 2018 series, 7 Days Out, the entire score of the 2020 HBO series, Atlanta's Missing and Murdered: The Lost Children, and the entire score of 2022 I Love My Dad, which won both the Grand Jury and Audience Narrative Feature Competition Award at the 2022 South by Southwest (SXSW) Film and TV Festival.

== Discography ==
=== Studio albums ===
- Youth (2014)

01. Shapeless
02. Colour
03. Thunder Clatter
04. Straight No Turns
05. Wishing Well
06. The Water
07. Drive
08. Hidden in the Night
09. Jonti
10. Wild Light
11. Summer Fires / Hidden Spells
12. Streetlights
13. Windows
14. Blacktide
15. Lies

- Closer (2017)

01. Magic
02. I Fall Over
03. Speak
04. Clicks
05. Wait
06. Somewhere
07. Mirror
08. Not With You
09. Fire
10. Rain
11. Go
