= Lankenau =

Lankenau is a surname. Notable people with the surname include:

- Cris Lankenau (born 1981), American actor
- John D. Lankenau (1817–1901), German-American businessman and philanthropist
- Jorge Lankenau (1944–2012), Mexican banker and businessman
