= Lovetap! =

Studio album by Smallpools
- Released: March 24, 2015
- Genre: Indie pop
- Length: 44:30
- Label: RCA Records
- Producer: Captain Cuts

Smallpools chronology
Smallpools EP (2013)	Lovetap! (2015)	The Science of Letting Go (2017)

Professional ratings
Aggregate scores
Source	Rating
Metacritic	73/100
Review scores
Source	Rating
AllMusic	4/5 stars

Lovetap! (stylized in all caps) is the debut studio album by the American indie pop band Smallpools. The album was released on March 24, 2015. Lovetap! was made available for streaming on March 17, 2015 via Spotify.

== Track listing ==
All tracks are written by Smallpools, Ben Berger, and Ryan McMahon.

No.	Title	Length
1.	"American Love"	2:59
2.	"Killer Whales"	3:42
3.	"Dreaming"	3:36
4.	"Karaoke"	3:29
5.	"Street Fight"	3:23
6.	"Mason Jar"	3:39
7.	"Over & Over"	2:47
8.	"Lovetap!"	3:47
9.	"What's That a Picture Of?"	2:45
10.	"Dyin' to Live"	3:15
11.	"Admission to Your Party"	2:58
12.	"9 To 5"	2:11
13.	"No Story Time"	3:02
14.	"(Submarine)"	3:17
Total length:		44:30

Lovetap! – Japan edition (bonus tracks)
No.	Title	Length
15.	"Dreaming" (The Chainsmokers Remix)	4:57
16.	"Dreaming" (Live Acoustic)	3:28
17.	"Karaoke" (Karaoke Version)	3:30

Tracks 3, 6, 7, and 13 were previously released on the Smallpools EP
