= Thunder Clatter =

Single by Wild Cub

from the album Youth
- Released: January 14, 2013
- Recorded: 2012
- Genre: Indie rock, indie pop, tropical pop
- Length: 4:31
- Label: Big Light, Mom + Pop
- Songwriters: Keegan DeWitt, Jeremy Bullock
- Producers: Dabney Morris, Wild Cub

Wild Cub singles chronology
| "Running" (2012) | "Thunder Clatter" (2013) |

"Thunder Clatter" is a song by Nashville-based indie rock quintet Wild Cub. The song was released as the lead single from the band's debut album Youth on January 14, 2013, but did not chart until it featured in a Bose advertising campaign later that year.

== Critical reception ==
"Thunder Clatter" received generally positive reviews from music critics. Paul Brown, founder and managing editor of TV Ad Music, described "Thunder Clatter" as "a catchy piece of tropical indie pop". The Guardian's Michael Cragg called it "disarmingly sweet tropical pop", adding that it had "something undeniably captivating about it, especially once they start chanting: 'I hear it call in the centre of it all, you're the love of my life'". Consequence of Sound's Alex Young called it a "frenzied composition" with "the right ingredients for dancing" and listed it as one of two essential tracks on the album Youth. Young noted that the song's prevailing lyrical themes, which surface through the guitar, the bass and the claps, are loud and clear: "I hear it all in the center of my heart / You're the love of my life". In an edition of their "Singles Swap" column, Entertainment Weekly recommended "Thunder Clatter" to listeners who enjoyed "Little Talks" by Of Monsters and Men.

== Music video ==
A live in-studio video of "Thunder Clatter", which runs four minutes and fifty seconds, features band members Keegan DeWitt, Jeremy Bullock, Dabney Morris, Harry West and Eric Wilson at a raucous get-together: they "just invite some friends over to theirs, drink lots of wine and then film it." In December 2013, the band released an official lyric video for the track, featuring photography by Margaret Durow.

== Commercial performance ==
"Thunder Clatter" failed to chart upon its initial single release in January 2013; it was featured in the Bose Corporation's "Better Sound Makes Everything Better" television advertisement campaign in July and subsequently peaked at number 59 on the UK Singles Chart.

== Charts ==
=== Weekly charts ===
| Chart (2014) | Peak position |
|---|---|
| UK Singles (Official Charts) | 59 |
| UK Indie (Official Charts) | 11 |
| US Hot Rock & Alternative Songs (Billboard) | 34 |
| US Rock & Alternative Airplay (Billboard) | 20 |
| US Adult Alternative Airplay (Billboard) | 20 |
| US Alternative Airplay (Billboard) | 17 |

=== Year-end charts ===
| Chart (2014) | Position |
|---|---|
| US Hot Rock Songs (Billboard) | 78 |
| US Alternative Songs (Billboard) | 39 |

== Release history ==
| Region | Date | Format | Label |
|---|---|---|---|
| United States | November 11, 2013 | Digital download | Mom + Pop Music |
| United States | January 13, 2014 | Adult album alternative radio | Mom + Pop Music |
