= Gemini (2017 film) =

- Theatrical release poster
- Directed by: Aaron Katz
- Written by: Aaron Katz
- Produced by: Mynette Louie; Sara Murphy; Adele Romanski
- Starring: Lola Kirke; Zoë Kravitz; Greta Lee; Nelson Franklin; Reeve Carney; Jessica Parker Kennedy; Ricki Lake; John Cho
- Cinematography: Andrew Reed
- Edited by: Aaron Katz
- Music by: Keegan DeWitt
- Production companies: Neon; Film Science; Rough House Pictures; Syncopated Films; Pastel Productions
- Distributed by: Neon (United States); Stage 6 Films (international)
- Release dates: March 12, 2017 (SXSW); March 30, 2018 (United States)
- Running time: 92 minutes
- Country: United States
- Language: English
- Box office: $200,340

Gemini is a 2017 American mystery thriller film written, directed and edited by Aaron Katz. It stars Lola Kirke, Zoë Kravitz, Greta Lee, Nelson Franklin, Reeve Carney, Jessica Parker Kennedy, Ricki Lake, and John Cho. The plot follows the assistant of a Hollywood actress who must clear her name after her starlet boss is found murdered in her home.

The film had its world premiere at South by Southwest on March 12, 2017, and was released in the United States on March 30, 2018, by Neon.

== Plot ==
In Los Angeles, Jill LaBeau is a friend and personal assistant to movie star Heather Anderson. Heather has decided to drop out of an upcoming film, upsetting numerous people, as the movie will not go forward without her in it. Late one night, at Heather's request, Jill walks into a diner to break the news of Heather's decision to Greg, the director. After he leaves, Heather enters, joins Jill, and is then joined by Sierra, an awkward fan. Sierra asks to take a picture with Heather, and she reluctantly agrees. Sierra posts the photo on social media.

As they leave the diner, paparazzi ask questions and take photos of Heather. One of them, Stan, asks Heather about Devin, her ex-boyfriend, and Tracy, her rumored new love interest. The two women go to Jill's apartment. Heather asks Jill to lend her gun to her, a .22 snub nose. Jill is hesitant, but Heather says she does not feel safe with so many people angry at her. Jill loads the gun with bullets and gives it to her. They then go out to a nightclub where they meet up with Tracy. Before they leave, Tracy tells Heather she will be at the cabin the next day. Tracy and Heather kiss before parting ways.

Jill and Heather drive to Heather's mansion, where Jill ends up spending the night. Before they go to sleep, Heather notices a motion light turn on outside, but Jill dismisses it, saying it is probably just a coyote. Jill wakes up the next morning and takes the gun out of Heather's purse. It accidentally goes off, shattering a nearby coin case. Jill confesses to a startled Heather that she thought about taking the gun away, but she leaves it with Heather. After running some errands that morning, Jill returns to the mansion where she is shocked to discover Heather lying dead on the floor from gunshot wounds, with Jill's gun nearby. The coin collection is also gone. Police arrive at the mansion, and Detective Ahn makes Jill some tea as he interviews her. Jill later goes to the beach and tries calling Tracy, but she is only able to leave a message.

After meeting with Heather's agent, Jill returns to her apartment, but sees several police officers in the complex. As she tries to get away without being noticed, she is caught by Detective Ahn, who takes her to a nearby diner. He informs her that all the evidence points to her so far: her fingerprints are on the gun and shell casings, and her hands tested positive for gunpowder residue. They both notice that someone next to them is recording their conversation—Stan. While Ahn is briefly distracted by Stan, Jill slips away.

Jill gets her hair dyed blonde and goes to talk with Greg. While he packs his bags for a trip to Scotland, the two discuss who might have killed Heather. Police knock on the door, and Greg answers while Jill slips out the back. Jill then tracks down Devin to a bar. She talks to him and tries to find out where he was the night before and that morning, but Devin avoids the question and asks Jill about Heather's relationship with Tracy. Devin leaves without giving any answers, but leaves his hotel key at the bar. Jill takes it and searches his hotel room while Devin and his girlfriend are at the desk getting another key. In Devin's belongings, she finds a rare coin similar to the ones that were at Heather's house. When Devin and his girlfriend come back, Jill hides in the closet and overhears Devin asking his girlfriend to provide him with an alibi for Heather's murder. Though he maintains his innocence, he claims an alibi will make everything easier.

After sneaking out of Devin's room, Jill calls Tracy for help. She arrives and takes Jill to her house. Jill shows Tracy the rare coin she found in Devin's belongings, thinking it could be one of the ones that was taken from Heather's house. Tracy thinks it is just another one that Devin already owns.

Late that night, Jill overhears Tracy talking to someone on the phone; she hears her say "I can get her to come up to the cabin", "she's asleep now", and "I just really think I should bring her up there before something happens." While exploring the other rooms in the house, Jill finds the coins taken from Heather's mansion. She decides to sneak out of the house.

Jill rides a motorcycle away from Tracy's house and manages to lose a police car that is tailing her. She stops at a laundromat and listens to a message from Detective Ahn. She then sees a breaking news report that the police have retracted their ID of Heather as the murder victim. Jill then looks at social media accounts and sees that not only does Sierra, the fan they met at the diner, look like Heather, she even has the same Gemini tattoo on the back of her neck.

Early the next morning, Jill rides the motorcycle up to the cabin. Inside, she finds Heather, alive and well. The dead girl is Sierra; Heather shot Sierra when she broke into the house the morning before, but was too scared to go to the police. Jill is furious and Heather apologizes. For all that she has been through, Heather lets Jill punch her in the face.

Sometime later, Jill is helping Heather prepare for a TV interview about the incident. Detective Ahn stops by to watch.

== Cast ==
- Lola Kirke as Jill LaBeau, friend and personal assistant to Heather
- Zoë Kravitz as Heather Anderson, a movie star
- John Cho as Detective Edward Ahn
- Greta Lee as Tracy, Heather's girlfriend
- Michelle Forbes as Jamie Finnegan, Heather's agent
- Nelson Franklin as Greg, whose movie deal Heather rejected
- Reeve Carney as Devin, movie star and Heather's ex-boyfriend
- Jessica Parker Kennedy as Sierra, Heather's nearly look-alike and stalker
- James Ransone as Stan, a paparazzo
- Ricki Lake as Vanessa, television interviewer, recently offered a job to Jill

== Production ==
In May 2016, Lola Kirke, Zoë Kravitz, John Cho, Ricki Lake, Greta Lee, Michelle Forbes, Nelson Franklin, Reeve Carney, Jessica Parker Kennedy and James Ransone joined the cast of the film, with Aaron Katz directing from a screenplay he wrote, while Mynette Louie, Sara Murphy and Adele Romanski produced it.

Keegan DeWitt composed the film's score.

=== Filming ===
Principal photography began in May 2016.

== Release ==
The film had its world premiere at South by Southwest on March 12, 2017. Shortly after, Neon acquired US distribution rights to the film. Sony Pictures Worldwide Acquisitions distributed the film internationally under their Stage 6 Films banner. It was released in the United States on March 30, 2018.

== Reception ==
On review aggregator website Rotten Tomatoes, the film has an approval rating of 70% based on 80 reviews, with an average rating of 6.20/10. The website's critical consensus reads, "A kaleidoscopic neo-noir, Gemini is a visually striking murder mystery with a convoluted but largely compelling plot and an impressive showing from Lola Kirke." On Metacritic, the film holds a weighted average score of 71 out of 100, based on 30 critics, indicating "generally favorable" reviews.
