= Dreaming (Smallpools song) =

Song by American rock band Smallpools

Single by Smallpools

from the album Smallpools and Lovetap!
- Released: May 16, 2013
- Recorded: 2013
- Genre: Indie pop; dance-rock; pop rock
- Length: 3:38
- Label: RCA
- Songwriters: Joseph Intile; Beau Kuther; Michael Kamerman; Sean Scanlon; Ben Berger; Eli Maiman; Ryan McMahon
- Producer: Ben Berger

Smallpools singles chronology
"Dreaming" (2013)	"Killer Whales" (2014)

"Dreaming" is a song by American rock band Smallpools. The band's songwriting partnership with Los Angeles-based production trio Captain Cuts was responsible for "Dreaming", which was released online in May 2013 as the band's debut single. They had yet to play a live show when they signed a major-label deal with RCA Records, which began distributing the single. It was later included on the band's self-titled extended play, as well as their debut studio album Lovetap! (2015).

The song received positive responses from contemporary music critics, many of whom compared the song to the music of Passion Pit. Its music video, released in July 2013, stars Scanlon experiencing déjà vu at a house party. "Dreaming" was the band's biggest hit single; it charted at number 23 on Billboard's Alternative Songs chart, and was later certified gold by the Recording Industry Association of America.

== Background ==
Guitarist Mike Kamerman and vocalist Sean Scanlon, both New Jersey natives, had been collaborating since 2007. They moved to Los Angeles in 2011 to further their music career, where they met bassist Joe Intile and drummer Beau Kuther, both from Oregon. Smallpools was officially formed in August 2012. They soon began working with L.A.-based production trio Captain Cuts, with whom they wrote and recorded "Dreaming". Manager Greg Federspiel's dog, Jax, graces the cover art of the "Dreaming" single; it was a random photo Scanlon had taken on his phone and decided to use for it.

The band's songwriting process at the time began with an idea of a melody or guitar lick played over a common chord progression; from there, the quartet would "jam it out" for hours in their rehearsal space. After solidifying more ideas, they would bring songs to their producers to determine what parts worked and what areas needed more development. Scanlon was responsible for the majority of the lyrics. Their relationship with Captain Cuts was open and communicative; "We feel like we have this good creative energy going right now – the vibe in the studio with [Captain Cuts] is really good," Scanlon told Vibe in 2013.

The band released a self-titled four-song extended play on July 16, 2013, featuring "Dreaming". The song was also later included on the band's 2015 debut album, Lovetap!. The song was later used on the soundtrack for the video game FIFA 14 and returned for FIFA 23 as part of the "Ultimate FIFA Soundtrack", as well as in The Vampire Diaries episode "I Know What You Did Last Summer".

== Music video ==
The official music video for "Dreaming" debuted online on Vevo on July 16, 2013. The video stars Scanlon caught in a time loop at a house party. Scanlon continues to repeat various activities-playing beer pong, socializing, playing with his band-with every attempt to escape, resulting in him snapping back into the loop. Eventually, he begins to notice a young woman with a pixie cut and follows her into the backyard pool, before coming up for air and finally breaking the loop. It was a shot at a home in the Woodland Hills neighborhood of Los Angeles that the band rented. The group invited all of their personal friends to act in the video; Kamerman joked the "fake party" developed into a real one.

== Reception ==
"Dreaming" debuted on May 16, 2013 on the blog of label Neon Gold Records, which also handled single releases from Passion Pit and Sir Sly. Within three days of its release, it hit number one on the Hype Machine, a music blog aggregator. The first radio station to play the track was KTCL in Denver, Colorado, after its staff discovered it on the Hype Machine. The band's manager, Greg Federspiel, assisted them in signing a deal with major label RCA Records. The band had been together formally for less than a year before the success of "Dreaming", and had yet to perform live. It quickly gained airplay on alternative radio stations in the U.S., first charting on Billboard's Alternative Songs chart in the issue dated June 29, 2013. Seven weeks later, the song achieved its peak position of number 23. They went on tour after the release of their first EP, and opened for Walk the Moon and Twenty One Pilots.

The song was well-received by contemporary music critics. Allmusic reviewer Matt Collar praised "Scanlon's soaring tenor vocals," as well as "the group's potent combination of shimmering Dayglo synths, crisp guitar licks, and propulsive dancefloor beats." It was frequently compared to the music of Passion Pit. Chris Payne at Billboard wrote that "Smallpools' opening statement sounds like it was written to be one of alternative radio's songs of the summer, with its exuberant, helium-voiced Passion Pit vocal riffage; sparkling, hi-fi production; and young-and-invincible 'tude." The group hoped to counter these comparisons with the release of their debut EP. "We are very eager to put out this collection of songs, because "Dreaming" has since been mistaken for Passion Pit or MGMT or Foster the People, which we're all fans of," said Kamerman.

The single was certified gold by the Recording Industry Association of America in 2018, which denotes 500,000 sales or streams.

== Certifications ==
Region	Certification	Certified units/sales
United States (RIAA)	Gold	500,000^{‡}
^{‡} Sales+streaming figures based on certification alone.
