= Smallpools =

American indie pop band

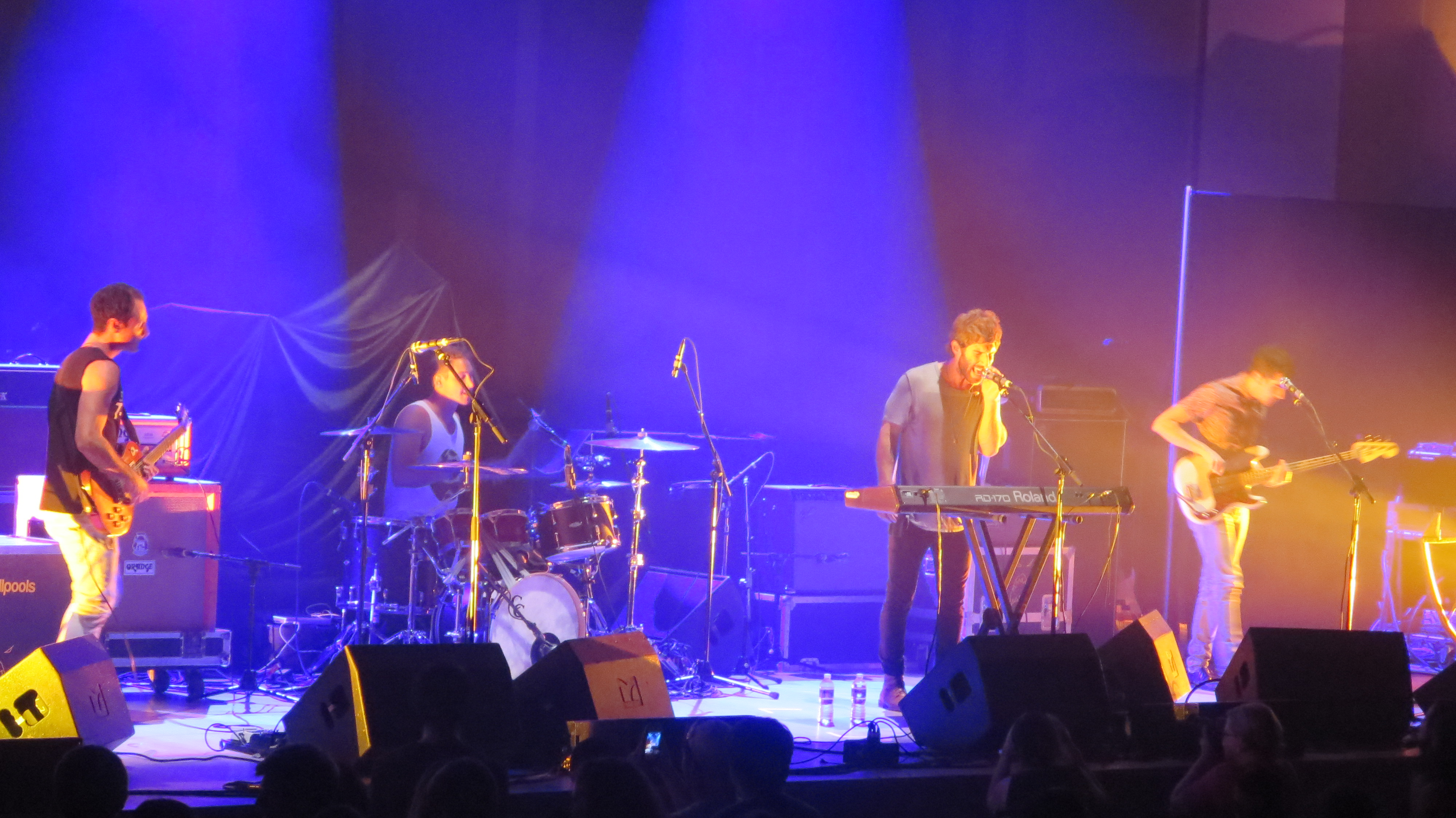
- Smallpools in 2013

Background information
- Origin: Los Angeles, California, U.S.
- Genres: Indie pop, alternative dance
- Years active: 2013–present
- Label: RCA
- Members: Sean Scanlon; Mike Kamerman; Beau Kuther
- Past members: Joe Intile
- Website: smallpoolsmusic.com

Smallpools is an American indie pop band formed in 2013. The band consists of Sean Scanlon (vocals), Mike Kamerman (guitar), and Beau Kuther (drums).

After their debut single "Dreaming" charted at number one on The Hype Machine, Smallpools' self-titled debut EP was released via RCA Records on July 16, 2013.

== History ==
Mike Kamerman, from Marlboro, New Jersey, and Sean Scanlon, from Verplanck, New York, had been playing in various bands since 2007. After relocating to Los Angeles to further their musical careers, they met Oregon natives Joe Intile and Beau Kuther. Working with producer trio Captain Cuts, the band released their debut single "Dreaming" online on May 16, 2013, reaching No. 23 on Billboard's Alternative Songs chart. The song was released as the first single off their debut, self-titled EP.

"Dreaming" was included on the FIFA 14 soundtrack. They made their late night television debut performing "Dreaming" on Jimmy Kimmel Live! on October 28, 2013. The band and their song "Over & Over" were featured in a promotional video for Snapchat, introducing Snapchat Stories in October 2013. The band released their first full-length album, Lovetap!, on March 23, 2015. In support of the album, they performed their second single "Karaoke" live on Late Night With Seth Meyers, in March 2015. Shortly after their first album release, the group took a year off, during which, Joe Intile left the group to raise a family.

On December 1, 2016 the band announced a new single to be released titled "Run With the Bulls". The song was accompanied with a music video via Billboard.com. After parting ways with RCA Records, the band partnered with AWAL / Kobalt Music Group and released The Science of Letting Go on August 4, 2017 followed up by the So Social EP on December 7, 2018. Collectively, the two EP's have generated over 100 million streams on Spotify. Smallpools released their sophomore album titled Life In A Simulation on October 15, 2021.

The band's third album, Cameras & Coastlines & Covers, released on August 11, 2023. It was followed up with an EP titled Ghost Town Road (east), which was then expanded as a studio album titled Ghost Town Road.

== Touring ==
The band made their live debut at the Brooklyn Bowl on July 13, 2013. On July 15, the band began touring in support of San Cisco across 10 cities in the United States. They have also supported several bands whilst touring America, including Two Door Cinema Club, Walk the Moon, Grouplove, Neon Trees, and Twenty One Pilots. On March 26, 2014, it was announced that Smallpools would perform at Lollapalooza on August 2, the second day of the three-day festival. On May 8, 2015, Smallpools performed on the main stage at the Rock in Rio USA in Las Vegas, Nevada. The band has also graced the stage at Firefly Music Festival twice, gathering large eager crowds in both 2014 and 2018. In 2015 Smallpools embarked on 2 sold out headlining tours (LOVETAP! Tour & The American Love Tour) in support of their RCA debut album LOVETAP!. Smallpools supported MisterWives on their 2017 Connect the Dots tour and in 2018 they co-headlined the Spring is Sprung tour with Great Good Fine Ok.

In 2019, Smallpools hit the road on their So Social tour which included sold out nights at the 9:30 Club in Washington, D.C., Bowery Ballroom in New York City, and the Bluebird Theatre in Denver. Smallpools finished off the year supporting Third Eye Blind on their "Screamer" tour. In 2025, Smallpools celebrated their Lovetap! 10th Anniversary Tour, which featured the temporary return of bassist Joe Intile.

== Band members ==
Current members

- Sean Scanlon – lead vocals, synthesizer, keyboards, piano (2013–present)
- Michael "Mike" Kamerman – guitar, vocals (2013–present)
- Beau Kuther – drums, vocals (2013–present)

Former members

- Joseph "Joe" Intile – bass guitar, vocals (2013–2015; 2025)

== Discography ==
=== Studio albums ===
- Lovetap! – RCA Records (March 24, 2015)
- Life in a Simulation – ONErpm (October 15, 2021)
- Cameras & Coastlines & Covers – ONErpm (August 11, 2023)
- Ghost Town Road – Nettwerk Music Group (September 20, 2024)

=== EPs ===
- Smallpools – RCA Records (July 16, 2013)
- The Science of Letting Go – AWAL (August 4, 2017)
- So Social – AWAL (December 7, 2018)
- Ghost Town Road (east) – Nettwerk Music Group (April 5, 2024)

=== Singles ===
- "Dreaming" (2013)
- "Mason Jar" (2013)
- "Killer Whales" (2014)
- "Karaoke" (2014)
- "A Real Hero" (2015)
- "Run With the Bulls" (2016)
- "Million Bucks" (2017)
- "Passenger Side" (2017)
- "Pray for Me" (2018)
- "Stumblin' Home" (2018)
- "Stumblin' Home" (featuring the Aces) (2018)
- "Social" (2018)
- "Insincere" (2019)
- "SYCS" (2019)
- "Play Pretend" (theme song for The Iliza Shlesinger Sketch Show) (2020)
- "Slowdown" (featuring Morgxn) (2020)
- "Cycle" (2020)
- "Simulation" (2020)
- "The Answer" (with NEFFEX) (2021)
- "Science Fiction" (2021)
- "Life of the Party" (2021)
- "Migraine" (2021)
- "Cameras and Coastlines" (2022)
- "Night Shift" (2023)
- "Motorbike (Wild Ones)" (2024)
- "Fake a Happy Face!" (2024)
