= I'll See You in My Dreams (2015 film) =

Film by Brett Haley

- Theatrical release poster
- Directed by: Brett Haley
- Written by: Brett Haley; Marc Basch
- Produced by: Rebecca Green; Brett Haley; Laura D. Smith
- Starring: Blythe Danner; Martin Starr; June Squibb; Rhea Perlman; Mary Kay Place; Malin Åkerman; Sam Elliott
- Cinematography: Rob C. Givens
- Edited by: Brett Haley
- Music by: Keegan DeWitt
- Production companies: Jeff Rice Films; Northern Lights Films; Part2 Pictures; Two Flints
- Distributed by: Bleecker Street
- Release dates: January 27, 2015 (Sundance); May 15, 2015 (United States)
- Running time: 96 minutes
- Country: United States
- Language: English
- Budget: $1 million
- Box office: $7.5 million

I'll See You in My Dreams is a 2015 American comedy-drama film directed, co-written, and co-produced by Brett Haley. It stars Blythe Danner, Martin Starr, Sam Elliott, Malin Åkerman, June Squibb, Rhea Perlman, and Mary Kay Place.

Widow and former singer Carol discovers it is never too late to find a deeper connection with others.

The film was released on May 15, 2015 in a limited release by Bleecker Street.

== Plot ==
Widow and former singer Carol Petersen lives alone in California with her dog Hazel. Life is very routine, as she has not had a relationship since her husband died 20 years ago and has no desire to date or marry again.

One day Carol must put the elderly dog down, leaving her without a companion outside of her friends Georgina, Rona, and Sally who live in a retirement community. Coming home from the vet, she finds a large rat in her house, leading her to sleep outside for the night. In the morning, she meets her new pool man Lloyd outside. Although he unintentionally offends her, they begin an unlikely friendship.

Carol meets Bill while shopping and he flirts with her before leaving. Later, her friends convince her to do seniors speed dating, where she is uninterested in the men she meets. Encountering Bill outside, he asks her out.

When Carol gets home, she calls Lloyd to go to karaoke. He is a mediocre singer, but she impresses him with her ability. They go back to her house, and they discuss "living in the moment," which Carol dismisses. Lloyd is not looking forward to anything in his life, and feels he has no real prospects other than caring for his mother.

Bill wants to see Carol at the retirement community where he lives. They go out on his boat, the "So What" - which he has never done with anyone else. He bought it on a whim, as he did not want to be a retiree who fell into boring, stagnant routines. After dinner, Bill drives her home, and they kiss. He wants to see her again, and Carol is giddy, until she sees the rat again.

Carol and her friends get high, steal a cart after shopping, and evade a curious policeman. Getting home, she has a message from Bill, wanting another date. He spends the night and they are very much taken with one another. Over breakfast, he asks her if she would marry again. Carol lightheartedly scoffs, saying she hardly knows him.

The doorbell interrupts them. Lloyd tells her that he quit his job, though he did get another one as a pool cleaner. Carol is reluctant to invite him in, but Bill invites him to breakfast. Awkwardly, Lloyd says he just wanted to tell her about the new job and leaves.

Bill wants to see Carol again, but her daughter Katherine has come to town. She notes that her mom seems different, in a good way. Carol tells her that she is seeing someone, so Katherine wants to meet him. However, frantic messages from Rona are on her answering machine when they get back home, as Bill is in the hospital.

As only immediate family can see him, Carol is not admitted. Sadly, she soon gets a call that he has died, and grieves that she has lost someone again. She asks Katherine why people bother getting attached when death is inevitable, a sentiment she expressed to Lloyd earlier. Katherine points out all the good things that happened because Carol took chances and risks.

Carol's grief is palpable, but once her daughter has returned to New York, she resumes her routines of playing golf and cards with her friends. She goes to see Bill's moored boat and keeps a small memento of him on her fireplace mantel alongside her husband's and Hazel's ashes.

Lloyd comes to visit Carol in his new uniform. The rat appears again and he traps it, and afterwards she finally cries over losing Bill. He comforts her, playing a song that he wrote, "I'll See You in My Dreams." Later, Carol is with her friends, and Sally insists they all go on a cruise together. At first reluctant, Carol impulsively convinces the others. The film ends with her adopting an elderly dog and driving home with him, taking another chance at love.

== Cast ==
- Blythe Danner as Carol Petersen
- Martin Starr as Lloyd
- Sam Elliott as Bill
- Malin Åkerman as Katherine Petersen
- June Squibb as Georgina
- Rhea Perlman as Sally
- Mary Kay Place as Rona
- Max Gail as Carl

== Marketing ==
The official theatrical trailer was released on April 7, 2015.

== Release ==
I'll See You in My Dreams premiered at the 2015 Sundance Film Festival on January 27, 2015. Shortly after, worldwide rights to the film were acquired by Bleecker Street in a six-figure deal, beating out studios including CBS Films, Samuel Goldwyn Films and Sony Pictures Worldwide Acquisitions. It received a limited release on May 15, 2015.

=== Critical reception ===
The film received largely positive reviews from critics. On Rotten Tomatoes, it has a rating of 93%, based on 92 reviews, with an average rating of 7.3/10. The site's critical consensus reads, "I'll See You in My Dreams would be worth watching even if Blythe Danner's central performance was all it had going for it, but this thoughtful drama satisfies on multiple levels." On Metacritic, the film has a score of 75 out of 100, based on 27 critics, indicating "generally favorable" reviews.

=== Accolades ===
Award	Category	Nominee	Result
Gotham Independent Film Awards	Best Actress	Blythe Danner	Nominated
Satellite Awards	Best Actress	Blythe Danner	Nominated
Hollywood Music in Media Awards	Song - Feature Film	"I'll See You in My Dreams" - written and performed by Keegan DeWitt	Nominated
