= The Hero (2017 film) =

- Theatrical release poster
- Directed by: Brett Haley
- Written by: Marc Basch; Brett Haley
- Produced by: Houston King; Sam Bisbee; Erik Rommesmo
- Starring: Sam Elliott; Laura Prepon; Krysten Ritter; Nick Offerman; Katharine Ross
- Cinematography: Rob Givens
- Edited by: Brett Haley
- Music by: Keegan DeWitt
- Production companies: Northern Lights Films; Park Pictures; Houston King Productions
- Distributed by: The Orchard
- Release dates: January 21, 2017 (Sundance); June 9, 2017 (United States)
- Running time: 93 minutes
- Country: United States
- Language: English
- Budget: $1.2 million
- Box office: $4.1 million

The Hero is a 2017 American comedy-drama film directed and edited by Brett Haley and written by Haley and Marc Basch. It stars Sam Elliott, Laura Prepon, Krysten Ritter, Nick Offerman and Katharine Ross and follows an aging movie star who deals with his terminal illness.

The film premiered at the Sundance Film Festival on January 21, 2017 and was released on June 9, 2017 by The Orchard.

== Plot ==
Lee Hayden is an aging Western actor in his 70s with a golden voice, whose best performances are decades behind him. He mostly gets voice work for ads.

Peter, Lee's agent, calls to tell him a group wants to give him a lifetime achievement award for his acting work in Westerns, but no job offers. Directly afterwards Lee's doctor confirms he has pancreatic cancer.

Lee spends his days reliving old glories and smoking marijuana with his former-co-star-turned-dealer, Jeremy, but the surprise cancer diagnosis brings his priorities into sharp focus. Besides trying to tell Jeremy, he also contacts his ex-wife Val and attempts to reconnect with his estranged daughter, Lucy. Instead of telling them about the cancer he says he is going to do another film, his euphemism for the cancer.

Also inviting Lucy to the award ceremony on Sunday, which she cannot attend, instead Lee arranges to take her to lunch on Tuesday. He runs into Charlotte, who he had met in passing at Jeremy's. She asks for his number and he invites her to be his date at the awards ceremony.

On the way there in the taxi, they both take a bit of ecstasy. It helps both of them get through the event smiling. They do official photos, meet and greet with guests and he even signs autographs. Then, after watching a clip, Lee goes on stage to accept the award. A video of it goes viral, as he regifts the award to an audience member, saying everyone there is deserving of it.

The next morning, Lee wakes up in bed with Charlotte next to him. Over coffee, he reiterates that she is too young for him as she is not much older than Lucy. Notwithstanding, they soon strike up an exciting, contentious relationship.

They discover his speech went viral. Charlotte invites him to her stand-up comic routine that evening. In the meantime, Peter calls to say that Lee is now flooded with offers. He faxes him a script for an audition on Tuesday and Jeremy runs lines with him.

At the audition, Lee breaks down in what seems to be an emotional response to the scene. Upset and angry, Lee lashes out at a fan, then goes home. There he consumes copious amounts of alcohol and other substances. He slept through his lunch date and when he comes to he sees her messages, but she is unreachable.

Charlotte arrives, apologizing for her set. Lee finally tells her he is dying and she makes him promise to tell his family and to undergo the procedure his oncologist proposes. He first tells Val who gets in touch with Lucy and he can make amends.

== Cast ==
- Sam Elliott as Lee Hayden
- Laura Prepon as Charlotte Dylan
- Krysten Ritter as Lucy Hayden
- Nick Offerman as Jeremy Frost
- Katharine Ross as Valarie Hayden
- Ali Wong as Herself
- Cameron Esposito as Herself
- Doug Cox as Doctor
- Max Gail as Gary Babcock
- Jackie Joyner as Betsy
- Patrika Darbo as Diane
- Frank Collison as Man In Dream
- Andy Allo as The Bartender
- Linda Lee McBride as Linda
- Christopher May as The Director
- Demetrios Saites as Paparazzi Cameraman

== Production ==
On April 20, 2016, it was reported that Sam Elliott would star in The Hero, directed and co-written by Brett Haley. Other cast members included Laura Prepon, Krysten Ritter, Nick Offerman, and Elliott's wife Katharine Ross.

Filming took place throughout Los Angeles and lasted 18 days.

== Release ==
The film had its world premiere at the Sundance Film Festival on January 21, 2017. Shortly after, The Orchard acquired distribution rights to the film. It was released on June 9, 2017.

=== Critical response ===
On review aggregator Rotten Tomatoes, the film has an approval rating of 77% based on 115 reviews, with an average rating of 6.7/10. The site's critical consensus reads, "The Hero rests on Sam Elliott's understated performance, which proves more than capable of carrying the film through the less inspired moments of its somewhat clichéd story." On Metacritic, which uses a weighted average, the film has a score of 61 out of 100, based on 28 critics, indicating "generally favorable reviews".
