= Quiet City (film) =

2007 film by Aaron Katz

- Theatrical release poster
- Directed by: Aaron Katz
- Written by: Aaron Katz; Erin Fisher; Cris Lankenau
- Produced by: Brendan McFadden; Ben Stambler
- Starring: Erin Fisher; Cris Lankenau; Sarah Hellman; Joe Swanberg; Tucker Stone
- Cinematography: Andrew Reed
- Edited by: Aaron Katz
- Music by: Keegan DeWitt
- Distributed by: 600 West Productions; Benten Films
- Release date: August 31, 2007
- Running time: 78 minutes
- Country: United States
- Language: English
- Box office: $15,610

Quiet City is a 2007 film directed by Aaron Katz that premiered at the 2007 South by Southwest Film Festival in the Emerging Visions category. It subsequently played at film festivals around the world, including the Sarasota Film Festival, Maryland Film Festival, Stockholm Film Festival and Milano Film Festival, before premiering theatrically in New York in August 2007.

== Plot ==
Jamie arrives in New York City, where she is supposed to meet her friend Samantha at a diner. After getting off the subway, she asks a man named Charlie for directions. Charlie escorts her to the diner, but Samantha never shows up and does not answer her phone when Jamie tries to call her. Charlie invites Jamie to his apartment, where they play music on his toy keyboard. The next day, the two go to visit Charlie's friend Adam and eat coleslaw. Then, they break into Samantha's apartment; she is not there. They decide to go to an art show by Jamie's friend Robin. They meet Robin and Charlie's acquaintance Kyle, who chastises Charlie for never socializing. Everyone then goes to Robin's place for an after-party. After spending some time talking to the other people there, Jamie and Charlie leave and take the subway back to his apartment.

== Cast ==
- Erin Fisher as Jamie
- Cris Lankenau as Charlie
- Sarah Hellman as Robin
- Joe Swanberg as Adam
- Tucker Stone as Kyle

== Critical reception ==
The film received praise from critics. As of 2016, the review aggregator Rotten Tomatoes reported that 84% of critics gave the film positive reviews, based on 19 reviews. The New York Times' Stephen Holden wrote of the film, "Tender and sad, it is a fully realized work of mumblecore poetry."

The film was nominated for the John Cassavetes Award at the 2008 Independent Spirit Awards for features made for less than $500,000. It also won Best Direction and Best Cinematography at the 2007 BendFilm Festival.
