= The New Year (film) =

2010 film by Brett Haley

- Film poster
- Directed by: Brett Haley
- Written by: Brett Haley; Elizabeth Kennedy
- Produced by: Brett Haley; Elizabeth Kennedy
- Starring: Trieste Kelly Dunn; Ryan Hunter; Kevin Wheatley; Linda Lee McBride; Marc Petersen
- Cinematography: Rob C. Givens
- Edited by: Brett Haley
- Music by: Austin Donohue
- Release dates: April 13, 2010 (SFF); July 30, 2010 (Brooklyn)
- Running time: 96 minutes
- Country: United States
- Language: English

The New Year is a 2010 American comedy-drama film directed, co-written, and co-produced by Brett Haley (in his feature directorial debut). The film stars Trieste Kelly Dunn as a former high school honors student who dropped out of college to return to her hometown of Pensacola, Florida to tend her ailing father. It also stars Ryan Hunter, Kevin Wheatley, Linda Lee McBride, and Marc Petersen.

The New Year premiered at the 12th Sarasota Film Festival on April 13, 2010, where it won the audience award. The film began a limited theatrical release on July 30, 2010.

== Synopsis ==
Sunny was in her junior year at college when her father was diagnosed with cancer, and she came home to help look after him. Two and a half years later, Sunny's dad is still around, and so is Sunny — she works at a bowling alley, keeps an eye on her dad, has a sweet if goofy boyfriend named Neal and a good friend to confide in, Amy. Overall, Sunny is content with her life, but she knows that she's not living up to her potential and at least for the moment has given up on her dreams as a writer. Sunny gets a potent reminder of her current stasis when she gets word Isaac, who she always regarded as a rival in high school, is coming back to town for a visit. As it happens, Isaac and Sunny get along better than expected, and while he's working on becoming a successful comedian, he encourages her to start taking her own talent seriously again. Sunny feels drawn to Isaac in a way she never did before, and she has to consider her future with Neal, as well as her academic and career goals.

== Cast ==
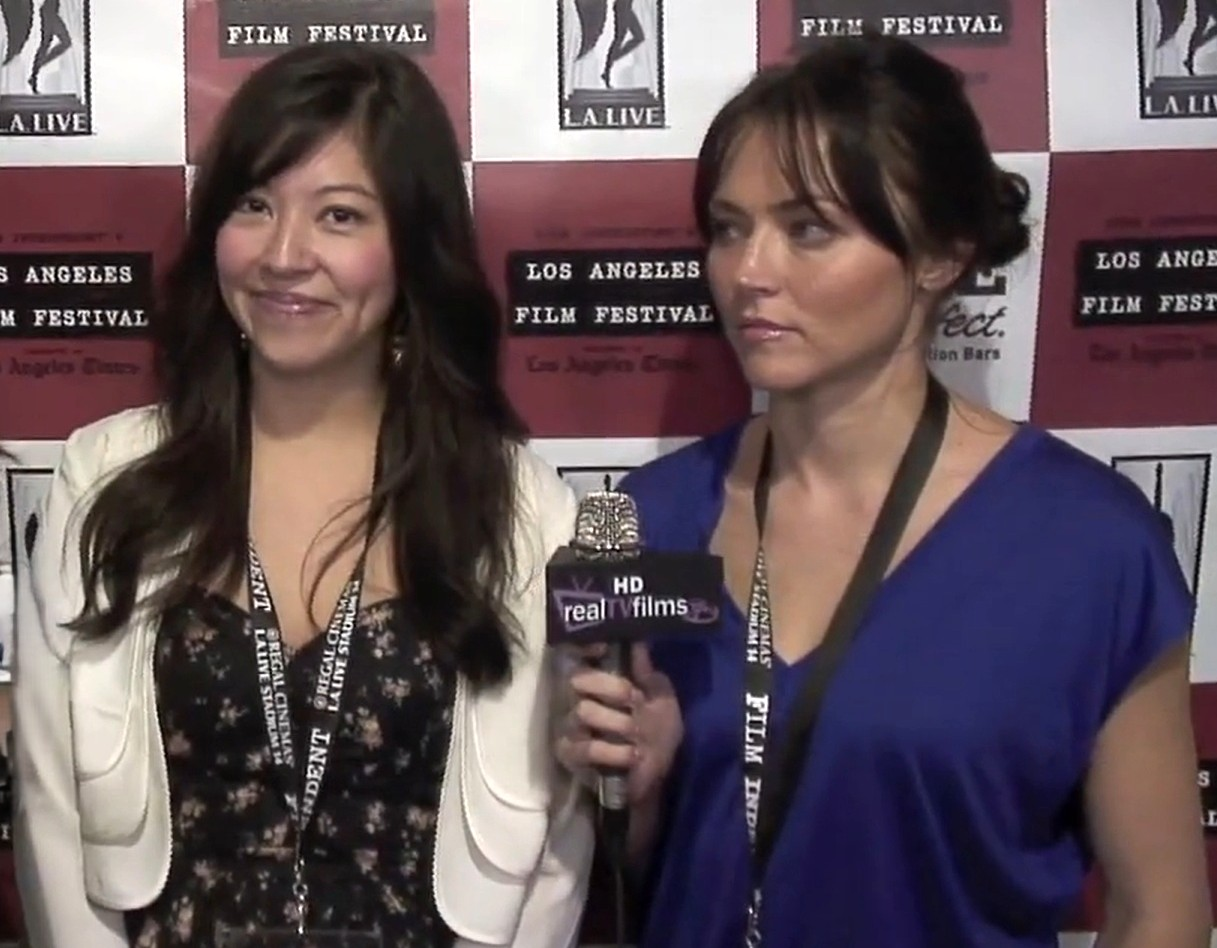
Linda Lee McBride, Trieste Kelly Dunn discuss The New Year at the Los Angeles Film Festival in 2010

- Trieste Kelly Dunn as Sunny
- Ryan Hunter as Isaac
- Kevin Wheatley as Neal
- Linda Lee McBride as Amy
- Marc Petersen as Daniel
- Carol Kahn Parker as Laura
- Lance Brannon as Glen
- David McElfresh as Bobby
- Justin McElfresh as Andy
- Jennifer Kay Godwin as Donna

== Release ==
The New Year premiered at the Sarasota Film Festival on April 13, 2010 and was an Official Selection at the 2010 Los Angeles Film Festival. The film had a one-week theatrical run at the reRun Gastropub Theater in Dumbo, Brooklyn, New York City, beginning on July 30, 2010.

GoDigital eventually picked up the film and released it on VOD platforms.

== Reception ==
=== Critical response ===
On review aggregator website Rotten Tomatoes, The New Year has a 100% rating based on 5 reviews.

The film received positive reviews from critics, who praised Brett Haley's direction and Trieste Kelly Dunn's performance. Mark Olsen of Los Angeles Times noted that "Dunn brings an understated strength to the film's portrait of ambitions thwarted and reignited and the tension between responsibilities to one's family and to oneself." Andy Webster of The New York Times wrote that Dunn was "smart and attractive [and] steadily, wordlessly conveys her character's internal struggle." Steve Dollar of The Wall Street Journal stated that "Dunn carries Brooklyn-based director Brett Haley's debut with a face made for the subtle calibrations of emotional conflict."

=== Awards and nominations ===
Year	Festival	Category	Recipient	Result
2010	Sarasota Film Festival	Audience Award for Best Narrative Feature	Brett Haley	Won
2010	Los Angeles Film Festival	Narrative Award for Best Narrative Feature	Brett Haley	Nominated
