= Cris Lankenau =

American actor (born 1981)

- Born: Cris Lankenau; June 24, 1981 (age 44); Miami, Florida U.S.
- Occupation: Actor
- Years active: 2007–present

Cris Lankenau (born June 24, 1981) is an American actor.

== Biography ==
Cris Lankenau was born in Miami, Florida and grew up in Orlando and Boca Raton, Florida. He currently resides in Brooklyn, New York.

== Career ==
After leaving high school in Boca Raton, Lankenau moved to New York and joined with the growing creative community centered in Williamsburg, Brooklyn working as a DJ and writing occasionally for Vice magazine. He soon met filmmakers Aaron Katz and Brendan McFadden and was cast as the lead in Katz’ second feature film, Quiet City. Lankenau and co-star Erin Fisher wrote much of their own dialogue for the movie and according to director Katz: "I had a full 120-page script, but when it came time to shoot it, everything was in the actors' own words. The structure compares to the script scene by scene, but the things that happen in each scene happened through the actors. A lot of times, things would happen in the first take that would be unexpected, and we would talk about how to incorporate them into the scene." Both Lankenau and Fisher received a writing credit on the film and for improvising the music for the closing credits. The film was well received by critics and was nominated for a John Cassavetes Award at the 2007 Independent Spirit Awards.

Lankenau worked with Katz again as the lead in his 2010 mystery, Cold Weather playing Doug, the aimless, Sherlock Holmes obsessed brother to Trieste Kelly Dunn’s character Gail. As with Quiet City, director Katz encouraged the two leads to improvise dialogue and even went so far as to arrange “brother and sister dates” for the actors so they could bond and develop a more natural and authentic sibling relationship on screen. The film received positive reviews and of Lankenau and co-star Raúl Castillo, Chicago Sun-Times critic Roger Ebert wrote: “Cris Lankenau and Raúl Castillo as Doug and Carlos do a very difficult thing here, which is to play young male friends without the slightest shadow of Buddy Movie Syndrome.”

He has most recently starred in two short films: Benny to Benny and Toothbrush.

== Filmography ==
Actor
Year	Title	Role	Notes
2007	Quiet City	Charlie	
2010	Cold Weather	Doug	
2010	Benny to Benny	Benny	
2011	Toothbrush	Ernest	
2014	Red Right Return	Ian	

Writer
Year	Title	Notes
2007	Quiet City	

== See also ==
- List of people from Miami
