= Cold Weather =

- Directed by: Aaron Katz
- Written by: Aaron Katz
- Story by: Aaron Katz; Brendan McFadden; Ben Stambler
- Produced by: Brendan McFadden; Ben Stambler; Jay Van Hoy; Lars Knudsen
- Starring: Cris Lankenau; Trieste Kelly Dunn; Raúl Castillo; Robyn Rikoon
- Cinematography: Andrew Reed
- Edited by: Aaron Katz
- Music by: Keegan DeWitt
- Distributed by: IFC Films
- Release dates: March 13, 2010 (SXSW); February 4, 2011 (United States)
- Running time: 97 minutes
- Country: United States
- Language: English
- Box office: $144,056

Cold Weather is a 2010 American mystery film directed by Aaron Katz and written by Katz, Brendan McFadden, and Ben Stambler. The film stars Cris Lankenau as a former forensic science student investigating the disappearance of his ex-girlfriend. The film was shot and set in Portland, Oregon. Cold Weather premiered at the South by Southwest Film Festival in March 2010 and was released in the United States by IFC Films in February 2011.

== Plot ==
Doug has moved into a place in Portland with his sister, Gail. He moved from Chicago, where he was studying forensic science before dropping out of school. Doug and Gail have dinner with their mother and stepfather. Later, Doug shows up at the office where Gail works and convinces her to go to the coast with him for the rest of the day. Doug gets a job moving ice at an ice factory. There, he becomes friends with his co-worker, Carlos. Doug's ex-girlfriend, Rachel, arrives in Portland, and Doug meets with her. She says that she is in town to train at her employer's office. Doug invites Carlos and Rachel to his place, and they, along with Gail, play games together. The four of them continue to hang out. Carlos is also a DJ, and the other three go to his set and dance. Doug introduces Carlos to Sherlock Holmes books. Carlos and Rachel go to a Star Trek convention together.

One night, Carlos visits Doug and says that Rachel did not show up to his DJ set and has gone missing. He is worried that something bad happened. Doug is initially not bothered by this, but he goes to Rachel's motel room with Carlos. They look around the room. Doug sees that a man in the parking lot is watching them, and the man drives away when they confront him. After visiting Gail, Doug and Carlos go back to the motel room. They locate a code and learn about a suspicious man wearing a cowboy hat. Doug realizes that the code involves baseball statistics. He and Gail do some research to break the code, and they find out about a meeting time and place. They show up and get another code from a payphone. Rachel also shows up there. She tells Doug that she had a job involving online photography and that her photographer was Jim Warden, the man in the cowboy hat. For her latest job, Jim had asked her to deliver a briefcase full of money to Portland. Jim then stole the briefcase from her motel room before she could deliver it. Doug says that he will find Jim and help her get the briefcase back.

Doug tracks down where Jim lives using clues from Jim's photographs. Doug and Carlos wait in Gail's car outside Jim's place. Then, Carlos goes to stay with Rachel, and Gail joins Doug in the car. Jim leaves his place, and Doug and Gail follow him in the car. Jim goes into a building and gets the briefcase. Doug and Gail follow him to a restaurant, where he is meeting with someone. In the restaurant, Doug and Gail decide to steal the briefcase. Gail disguises herself, and Doug removes her car's license plate and then drives to the front of the restaurant. Gail takes the briefcase and runs to the car. She drives off with Doug in the passenger seat, and Jim unsuccessfully tries to catch up to them. Gail drives to the empty roof of a parking garage. Doug calls Carlos and Rachel and tells them where they are. Then, Doug and Gail listen to music in the car together.

== Cast ==
- Cris Lankenau as Doug
- Trieste Kelly Dunn as Gail
- Raúl Castillo as Carlos
- Robyn Rikoon as Rachel

== Production ==
Cold Weather was shot on location in Portland, Oregon, using the Red One camera. Additional scenes were shot at Cannon Beach and The Dalles, Oregon.

== Reception ==
Cold Weather grossed $144,056 at the box office worldwide. The film has a 78% approval rating on the review aggregation website Rotten Tomatoes, based on reviews from 63 critics with an average rating of 6.87/10. The website's critics consensus reads: "For viewers who manage to stay invested in its occasionally aimless story, Cold Weather proves a surprisingly sophisticated blend of mumblecore and indie noir." At Metacritic, it has a score of 64 based on reviews from 21 critics, indicating "generally favorable" reviews.

Manohla Dargis of The New York Times wrote, "With no grand speeches or oversized gestures, Mr. Katz creates a specific world that gracefully enlarges with universal meaning." Roger Ebert of the Chicago Sun Times wrote, "Cold Weather is good in so many subtle ways, I despair of doing them justice. It's a thriller involving the personalities of its characters, who we get to know surprisingly well. It remains low-key even during its final big chase scene, which only involves one car. The acting is so good, you may not notice it. Although the characters stumble over the plot at least 40 minutes into the film, it's as ingenious as a high-tech Friday night special." He also praised the performances of Lankenau and Castillo. The film received Two Thumbs Up from Christy Lemire and Ignatiy Vishnevetsky of Ebert Presents: At the Movies; it was the only film reviewed that week to receive the rating.

Owen Gleiberman of Entertainment Weekly wrote, "Cold Weather becomes the world's first mumblecore 'thriller' – a good idea for a movie that someone, in the future, should execute a bit less lackadaisically."
