= Brett Haley =

American film director (born c. 1983)

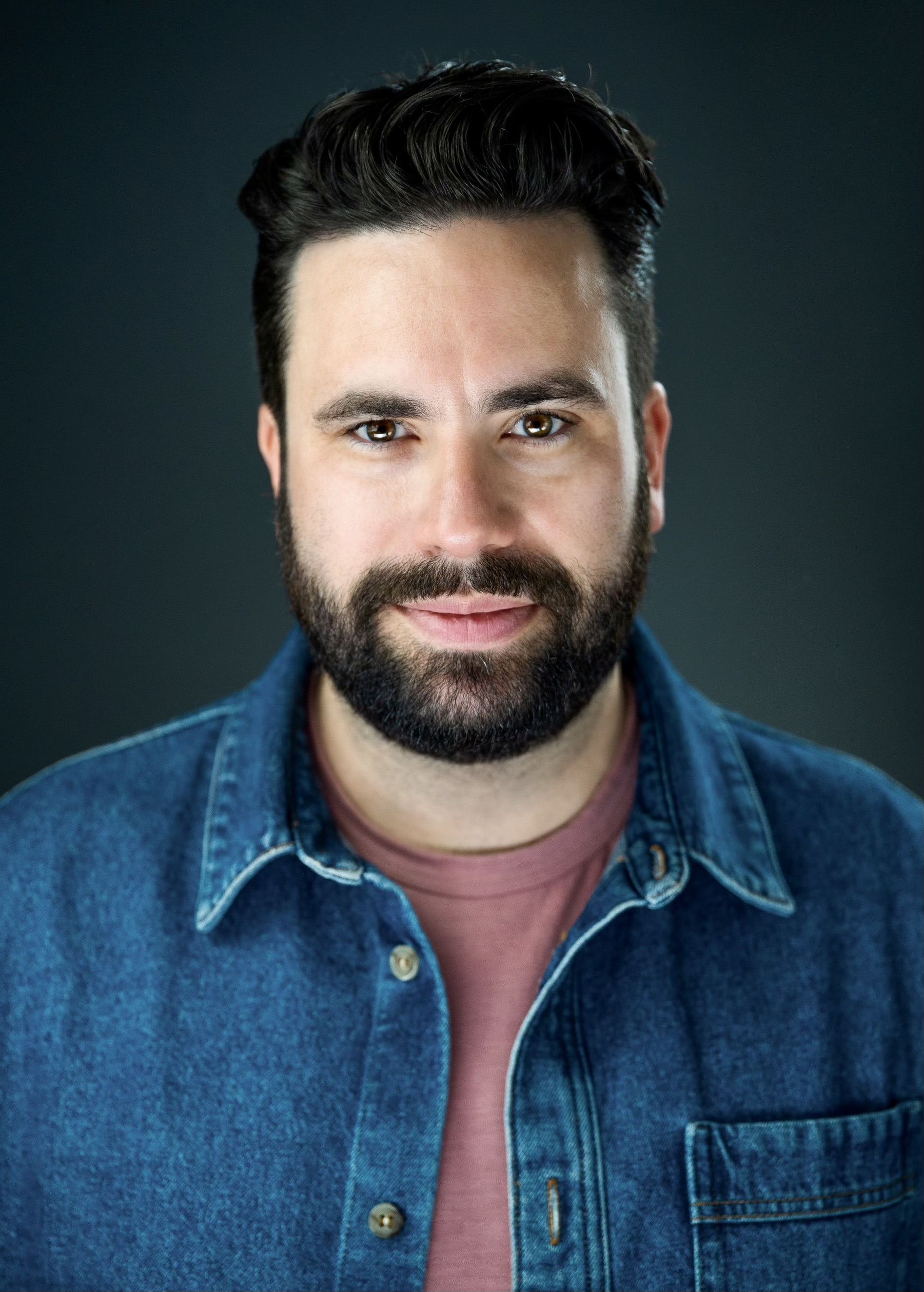
- Haley in 2022
- Born: August 17, 1983 (age 43); Illinois, U.S.
- Education: University of North Carolina School of the Arts
- Occupations: Director; screenwriter; producer; editor; actor
- Relatives: Joshua Ferris (brother)

Brett Haley (born c. 1983) is an American filmmaker and actor best known for his work on All the Bright Places and People We Meet on Vacation.

== Early life ==
Haley was born in Illinois and raised in Key West, Florida and Pensacola, Florida. Haley developed an interest in filmmaking from childhood, making films with a VHS camera from age 9, recalling, "From a young age, I was a storyteller. I just knew it was what I wanted to do". Haley credits his older brother, Joshua Ferris, for introducing him to movies like True Romance and Angel Heart. He was also influenced by 1980s and 1990s action movies, such as Alien, Terminator and Die Hard through his childhood.

Haley began his formal filmmaking education at the University of North Carolina School of the Arts School of Filmmaking in 2001, with a concentration in directing. He worked toward making a feature every summer, working with fellow UNCSA students to make up his crew. Of his time as a student, he says, "I learned a lot about what it means to be a collaborator at UNCSA. You learn quickly that film is very collaborative." Upon graduating in 2005, he moved to Los Angeles to work as a production assistant, but quickly relocated to Brooklyn when he realized that approach wasn't for him.

== Career ==
Haley's first feature film, The New Year, was co-written with his sister-in-law, novelist Elizabeth Kennedy, and made for $5,000. Although he considers himself a director first and foremost, Haley says, "I learned very young that if I wanted to make independent films and get those films off the ground, then I needed to be a writer. For me, it was important to start writing and discover: what am I going to write about? How am I going to write it?...That’s when I learned that I needed a writing partner. I write better with a partner and highly recommend that to those who are struggling". The New Year premiered at the Sarasota Film Festival in 2010 and won the Audience Award for Best Narrative Film.

In 2015, he co-wrote, edited, and directed I'll See You in My Dreams. Marc Basch was his co-writer. It premiered at the 2015 Sundance Film Festival, and went on to win awards for Best Actress and Best Director at the Louisiana Film Festival. Additionally, Blythe Danner was nominated for the Best Actress Award at the Gotham Awards for her role. In an interview, Sam Elliott says he "jumped at the chance to play a romantic lead" in the film; "it's always been what's on the page for me," says Elliott. "I don't know how this kid came up with such a gem about 70-year-olds at 29, or whatever he was when he wrote it."

Haley and his co-writer, Marc Basch, wrote The Hero specifically for Sam Elliott, who starred alongside Danner in I'll See You in My Dreams. Haley describes The Hero as his love letter to Elliott, saying that "Sam is the best. He is a true collaborator and an incredible actor and human being. He is so passionate about his work and, in my mind, he is an icon." The Hero also stars Laura Prepon, Nick Offerman, Katharine Ross and Krysten Ritter, and premiered in the U.S. Dramatic Competition category at the 2017 Sundance Film Festival. It was released in the U.S. by The Orchard in June 2017.

He co-wrote and directed the 2018 film Hearts Beat Loud. It premiered at the 2018 Sundance Film Festival, and also played at the 2018 South By Southwest Film Festival. It was released in the US on June 8, 2018.

On July 20, 2020, it was announced that Haley would direct the Grease prequel Summer Lovin'.

== Filmography ==
=== Film ===
Short film

Year	Title	Director	Writer	Producer	Editor
2005	The Life and Death of Jimmy Katz	Yes	No	Yes	No
2005	Sprinkler	Yes	Yes	No	No
2006	Seconds	Yes	No	No	No
2007	More Abandon	Yes	Yes	No	No
2012	Night Out	Yes	Yes	Yes	Yes
2012	Three	Yes	Yes	Yes	Yes

Feature film

Year	Title	Director	Writer	Producer	Editor
2010	The New Year	Yes	Yes	Yes	Yes
2015	I'll See You in My Dreams	Yes	Yes	Yes	No
2017	The Hero	Yes	Yes	No	Yes
2017	And Then I Go	No	Yes	Executive	No
2018	Hearts Beat Loud	Yes	Yes	No	No
2020	All the Bright Places	Yes	No	No	No
2020	All Together Now	Yes	Yes	No	No
2026	People We Meet on Vacation	Yes	No	No	No
2026	You Deserve Each Other	No	Yes	No	No

Acting roles

Year	Title	Role
2003	The Company You Keep	Nate
2007	Reservation Road	Brett
2015	I'll See You in My Dreams	Karaoke singer (uncredited)

=== Television ===
Year	Title	Director	Writer	Producer	Editor	Notes
2014	Barmaids	Yes	Yes	Yes	Yes	5 episodes; Also creator
2014	No Limits	Yes	No	No	No	11 episodes
2019	Looking for Alaska	Yes	No	No	No	Episode "I've Never Felt Before"
