= Dance Party USA (film) =

- Directed by: Aaron Katz
- Written by: Aaron Katz
- Produced by: Brendan McFadden; Marc Ripper
- Starring: Cole Pensinger; Anna Kavan; Ryan White; Natalie Buller; Sarah Bing; Brendan McFadden; Chad Hartigan
- Music by: Keegan DeWitt
- Release date: March 12, 2006
- Running time: 67 minutes
- Country: United States
- Language: English
- Budget: $3,500 (estimated)

Dance Party USA is a 2006 film written and directed by Aaron Katz. It stars Cole Pensinger and Anna Kavan. The film and director have also been mentioned by the media as an important part of the "mumblecore" movement in independent cinema.

== Plot ==
Apathetic 17-year-old Gus meets Jessica at a party, where he confesses to her that he raped an underage girl. He then sets out to appease his conscience.

== Production ==
Shot in 2004 in Portland, Oregon, the film took nearly two years to complete. Katz explained the reason for such as being due to the film's editor, Zach Clark, living in Virginia while he lived in Brooklyn. Clark would send edited footage on a DVD to Katz, who would then respond by sending notes to Clark.

== Release ==
The film debuted at the 2006 South by Southwest Film Festival and subsequently played at almost a dozen other festivals around the country and a two-week exclusive run at the Pioneer Theatre in New York City.

== Reception ==
The New York Times stated that "Dance Party USA is a remarkably delicate construction, directed with extraordinary empathy by Aaron Katz." In addition, The New York Sun placed it at number nine on their Top 10 Films of 2006 list and critic Amy Taubin lauded it in Art Forum, saying it was "in her pantheon of coming of age films."
