= Olga Fonda =

Russian-American actress (b. 1982)

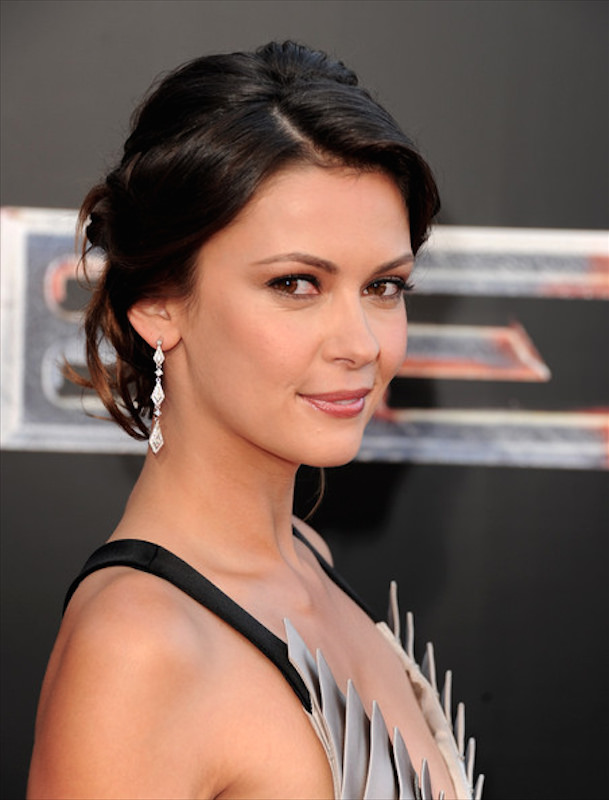
- Fonda in 2014
- Born: Olga Tchakova; October 1, 1982 (age 44); Ukhta, Komi ASSR, RSFSR, USSR
- Citizenship: Russia; United States
- Education: University of Maine at Augusta
- Occupations: Actress, model
- Years active: 2005–Present
- Notable work: The Vampire Diaries; Agent X (TV series)

Olga Tchakova (Russian: Ольга Чакова; known professionally as Olga Fonda; born October 1, 1982) is a Russian-American film and television actress and model. She is also known for her role as Nadia Petrova in The Vampire Diaries (2013–2014).

== Early life ==
Olga Tchakova was born in the Siberian region of Russia and then lived in Ukhta, Komi ASSR, Russian SFSR, Soviet Union, in the country's Komi Republic. Her father, she said, "had grocery stores in one of the Russian villages that I grew up in". She has an older brother.

She moved to Maine in the United States for a year at age 14, as an exchange student living with the Auclair family in East Winthrop, Maine, while attending Winthrop High School from 1996 to 1997. She returned to attend the University of Maine at Augusta, majoring in financial management.

== Career ==
While vacationing in Los Angeles, California, Fonda was scouted by agent Paul Fisher to pursue modeling, her longtime ambition. After acting in TV commercials, she played a Russian ballerina in the 2009 independent film Love Hurts.

Fonda, who has modeled since at least 2007 in Japan, Italy and the United States, went on to appear in television series including How I Met Your Mother, Nip/Tuck, Melrose Place, and Entourage, and played Owen Wilson's girlfriend in a nonspeaking role in Little Fockers. She was cast in the 2011 romantic-comedy Crazy, Stupid, Love, though her scene did not make the final cut; she does appear in the film's trailer.

In 2010, Fonda was cast in The Twilight Saga: Breaking Dawn. She had a supporting role in 2011's Real Steel. She played Nadia in The Vampire Diaries. In 2018, she was cast in the role of Sarah in the Netflix series Altered Carbon.

In 2012, Fonda appeared in television commercials for the related companies TJ Maxx, Marshalls and HomeGoods. In 2015, she was cast as Olga Petrovka in Agent X, appearing opposite Sharon Stone.

She is unrelated to the Fonda acting family and has said her reason for adopting that stage name "started as a mystery, [and so] I'm going to keep it a mystery. There’s really nothing to it but maybe one day I'll tell the story of how I got my name."

== Philanthropy ==
Fonda supports the St. Jude Children’s Research Hospital after being introduced to the charity by Jason Thomas Gordon, who started a campaign for the hospital called, Music Gives to St. Jude Kids.

She is also a supporter of The Heroes Project, which was founded by Tim Medvetz to help wounded veterans.

== Filmography ==
=== Film ===
Year	Title	Role	Notes
2009	The Breakdown	Chloe	TV-movie
2009	Love Hurts	Valeriya	
2010	Little Fockers	Svetlana	
2011	Love	Russian girl	Uncredited
2011	Captain Fork	Samantha	Short film
2011	Crazy, Stupid, Love.	Danielle	Uncredited
2011	Real Steel	Farra Lemkova	
2011	The Twilight Saga: Breaking Dawn – Part 1	Valentina (Volturi Assistant)	Deleted scene
2013	Olvidados	Lisa	
2017	Xibalba	Eli	
2017	9/11	Tina	

=== Television ===
Year	Title	Role	Notes
2006	Nip/Tuck	Elena	Episode: "Liz Cruz"
2007	Ugly Betty	Model #3	Episode: "I'm Coming Out", uncredited
2009	Entourage	Sales girl	Episode: "Give a Little Bit"
2009	How I Met Your Mother	Candy	Episode: "Robin 101"
2009	Melrose Place	Party girl	Episode: "Gower", uncredited
2010	Svetlana	Olga	Episode: "Yellowcake"
2013–2014	The Vampire Diaries	Nadia Petrova	Recurring role (season 5)
2013	Nikita	Larissa	Episode: "The Life We've Chosen"
2015	Agent X	Olga Petrovka	Recurring Role
2016	Hawaii Five-0	Anna Novick	Episode: "Waiwai"
2018	Altered Carbon	Sarah	Episode: "Out of the Past"
2018	My Dead Ex	Madame Fortuna	
2019	The Detour	Natalia	2 episodes
2026	For All Mankind	Natalya 'Tasha' Polivanova	Recurring role (season 5); 4 episodes

=== Video games ===
Year	Title	Role	Notes
2005	True Crime: New York City		
