= Videoheaven =

2025 documentary film

- Directed by: Alex Ross Perry
- Written by: Alex Ross Perry
- Produced by: Andrew Adair; Daniel Herbert; Jake Perlin; Alex Ross Perry
- Narrated by: Maya Hawke
- Edited by: Clyde Folley
- Production company: Cinema Conservancy
- Distributed by: Cinema Conservancy
- Release date: 2025
- Running time: 173 minutes
- Country: United States
- Language: English

Videoheaven is a 2025 American documentary film written, produced, and directed by Alex Ross Perry.

== Synopsis ==
The film explores the birth, life, death and aftermath of video stores in Hollywood cinema and television.

== Release ==
The film premiered at the Rotterdam International Film Festival in January 2025.

== Reception ==
On the review aggregator website Rotten Tomatoes, 85% of 34 critics' reviews are positive. The website's consensus reads: "Pure mana for anyone who ever made a home for themselves at the now-endangered video store, Alex Ross Perry's essayistic exploration of the niche community staple is larded with insight and nostalgia." Metacritic, which uses a weighted average, assigned the film a score of 71 out of 100, based on four critics, indicating "generally favorable" reviews.

Ben Kenigsberg of The New York Times wrote, "The observations range from the incisive to the grandiose, and at nearly three hours, Videoheaven could stand a tighter edit. Early on, a line of voice-over is sloppily repeated verbatim. And Perry only needs so many clips of obnoxious clerks, even if it's funny to see David Spade repeatedly typecast in that role. But the material will be irresistible to any cinephile who has spent countless hours in these spaces, and a critic would do well to admit susceptibility."

== See also ==
- Kim's Video - both the video store and the 2023 documentary film about the aforementioned store where the director was an employee
- Cinephilia
- The Last Blockbuster
