= Aatsinki =

Aatsinki is a Finnish surname of Sámi language origin. Notable people with this surname include:

- Brothers Aarne and Lasse Aatsinki, reindeer herders from the documentary Aatsinki: The Story of Arctic Cowboys
- Ulla Aatsinki (born 1965), Finnish historian
