= Yevgeniya Nikolayevna Sinskaya =

Soviet botanist (1889-1965)

Yevgeniya Nikolayevna Sinskaya (1889-1965) was a Russian botanist noted for her research in plant taxonomy, phytogeography, species formation, and genetics. She was head of the Taxonomy, Ecology and Geography Division at the Institute of Plant Industry. The standard author abbreviation Sinskaya is used to indicate this person as the author when citing a botanical name.
