= Michael Bilandic =

Michael Bilandic may refer to:

- Michael A. Bilandic (1923–2002), American politician, mayor of Chicago
- Michael M. Bilandic, American film director, writer and producer
