= Golden Exits =

2017 film by Alex Ross Perry

- Theatrical release poster
- Directed by: Alex Ross Perry
- Written by: Alex Ross Perry
- Produced by: Joshua Blum; Christos V. Konstantakopoulos; Alex Ross Perry; Adam Piotrowicz; Katie Stern
- Starring: Emily Browning; Adam Horovitz; Mary-Louise Parker; Jason Schwartzman; Chloë Sevigny; Lio Tipton (Note: Credited as Analeigh Tipton)
- Cinematography: Sean Price Williams
- Edited by: Robert Greene
- Music by: Keegan DeWitt
- Production companies: Bow and Arrow Entertainment; Faliro House Productions; Forager Films; Washington Square Films; Webber Gilbert Media
- Distributed by: Stage 6 Films; Vertical Entertainment
- Release dates: January 22, 2017 (Sundance); February 9, 2018 (United States)
- Running time: 94 minutes
- Countries: United States; Greece
- Language: English
- Box office: $41,888

Golden Exits is a 2017 drama film written, co-produced and directed by Alex Ross Perry. Starring Emily Browning, Adam Horovitz, Mary Louise Parker, Jason Schwartzman, Chloë Sevigny and Analeigh Tipton, it explores relationships and social constrictions.

The film had its world premiere at the Sundance Film Festival on January 22, 2017. It was released on February 9, 2018, by Stage 6 Films and Vertical Entertainment.

== Plot ==
Two families who live and work on the east side of the Carroll Gardens neighborhood of Brooklyn are interrupted by the arrival of Naomi, a 25-year-old Australian intern with connections to both families. Golden Exits explores the relationships among the characters, and the effect Naomi's presence has on them. Both Nick and Buddy consider a range of possible relationships with Naomi, which Alyssa and Jess are aware of to some extent. Gwen and Sam are affected as well, as the concerns and anxieties of each of their sisters brings in to relief their feeling about being married vs. being single. Naomi - 'a disruptive force, an obscure object of desire, a symbol of lost youth and possibility' - is completely aware of all of this as well as what she wants from the situation, and she acts accordingly.

Besides the threat of the extra-marital affair, the oppressive continuity of family is a recurring theme.

Another struggle Golden Exits focuses on is the anxiety and insecurity of the characters, particular to this age of social media, in which everyone's peers are almost certainly living better lives by comparison. As Perry puts it, "‘I didn’t have a master plan, but I had some ideas, and now I’m just kind of confused because it feels like the last three years have just kind of slipped away."

The name of the film refers to the desire that Sam has of experiencing optimal exits from one's relationships - exits that are never possible with inescapable family. Naomi's exit out of New York and the lives of the other characters at the end of her internship concludes the film, via conversations between Nick and Alyssa, and Buddy and Jess - re-knitting their relationships back together.

== Cast ==
- Emily Browning as Naomi, a summer intern from Australia
- Adam Horovitz as Nick, an archivist organizing his late father's-in-law papers
- Chloë Sevigny as Alyssa, Nick's wife and business partner
- Mary-Louise Parker as Gwendolyn, Alyssa's sister
- Lily Rabe as Sam, Gwendolyn's assistant
- Jason Schwartzman as Buddy, a recording studio owner whose mom was a college friend with Naomi's mom
- Lio Tipton as Jess, Buddy's wife and Sam's sister

== Production ==
In May 2016, it was revealed Alex Ross Perry had written and directed the film, with Emily Browning, Adam Horowitz, Mary-Louise Parker, Lily Rabe, Jason Schwartzman, Chloë Sevigny and Lio Tipton cast in the film.

== Cinematography ==
Cinematographer Sean Price Williams—who Perry regularly works with—shot this film on Super 16 mm film. The effects were positively reviewed, with descriptions including 'a creamy, grainy softness characteristic of features from the pre-Internet era;' along with 'Keegan DeWitt's gorgeous, sighing score' the effect is 'a kind of late afternoon enchantment that wafts over the film'; a 'sun-streaked springtime haziness—a quality of light, at once heavenly and earthy'. Chuck Bowen describes the effect as 'an explosion of earthy colors that communicate a sense of enchanted vagueness and lost-ness, and .. doesn’t quite seem to be playing out in real time'. A. A. Dowd also noted the imagery of his shots, including one in which 'Sevigny, back to the camera, staring across a long den at the back of her husband’s head, distance and direction amplifying the disconnect between them'. In another scene, Gwen and Alyssa sit in a living room holding glasses of wine, awkwardly positioned in an off-kilter arrangement. The framing—not subtle—is 'a visual choice that can feel like a long, hard, pitiless stare.'

== Release ==
The film had its world premiere at the Sundance Film Festival on January 22, 2017, and later screened at the Berlin International Film Festival. Shortly after, Sony Pictures Worldwide Acquisitions acquired international distribution rights to the film. while Vertical Entertainment and Stage 6 Films acquired U.S. distribution rights to the film, and set it for a February 9, 2018, release.

== Critical reception ==
Golden Exits received positive reviews from film critics. It holds a 67% approval rating on review aggregator website Rotten Tomatoes, based on 51 reviews, with a weighted average of 6.14/10. The website's critical consensus reads, "Golden Exits tells a small-scale tale whose seemingly mundane trappings belie a satisfying handful of finely tuned observations about modern life and relationships." On Metacritic, the film holds a rating of 69 out of 100, based on 19 critics, indicating "generally favorable" reviews. A. A. Dowd dismissed the film as a 'deadly fusion of the mundane and the affected, like some black-box-theater parody of an Ingmar Bergman art drama. David Sims argues that 'this is a movie that deserves to be seen—it’s a work of maturity and confidence from one of the indie world’s best young directors'.
