= Jobe'z World =

- Directed by: Michael M. Bilandic
- Written by: Michael M. Bilandic
- Produced by: Adam Ginsberg; Spencer Kiernan
- Starring: Jason Grisell; Theodore Bouloukos
- Cinematography: Sean Price Williams
- Edited by: Zach Clark
- Music by: Paul Grimstad
- Production company: Jobeworks
- Distributed by: Factory 25
- Release dates: 2 November 2018 (Indie Memphis Film Festival); 11 January 2019 (US)
- Running time: 70 minutes
- Country: United States
- Language: English

Jobe'z World is a 2018 American comedy film directed by Michael M. Bilandic, starring Jason Grisell and Theodore Bouloukos.

== Cast ==
- Jason Grisell as Jobe
- Theodore Bouloukos as Royce
- Stephen Payne as Ron
- Owen Kline as Zane
- Jeremy O. Harris as Jax
- Lindsay Burdge as Linda
- Sean Price Williams as Brad
- Keith Poulson as Frank
- Jason Giampietro as Joey
- Kate Lyn Sheil as Trish
- Jamie Granato as Trevor
- Natalie Swan as Lara
- Brian Allen Jackson as Adam
- Stephen Gurewitz as Radio DJ

== Release ==
The film was released in theatres on 11 January 2019.

== Reception ==
Richard Brody of The New Yorker wrote that while the film is "uneven", the film's inspirations "redeem its longueurs and virtually blast them off the screen and out of memory", and Bouloukos is a "secret weapon of independent cinema".

Frank Scheck of The Hollywood Reporter wrote that Bilandic "fails to infuse the painfully thin proceedings with any narrative momentum or comic flair, resulting in an oppressive weirdness for weirdness’ sake."

Mark Jenkins of NPR wrote that "at a mere 67 minutes, the movie is not exactly sprightly", as well as that while the screenplay "begins with a promising scenario", the characters are "sketchy", and the dialogue "needs a couple more spins through the word processor."
