= What Doesn't Float =

American dark comedy film by Luca Balser

- Directed by: Luca Balser
- Written by: Shauna Fitzgerald
- Produced by: Pauline Chalamet; Rachel Walden
- Starring: Pauline Chalamet; Cindy De La Cruz; Joel Nagle; Larry Fessenden; Roger Howarth; Declan Eells; Joseph Longo; Chanel Umoh; Dior Umoh; Keith Poulson; Lily Sondik; Amir Royale; Alexandra Templer
- Cinematography: Sean Price Williams; Hunter Zimny
- Edited by: Luca Balser
- Music by: Luca Balser; Samuel Weissberg
- Production company: Gummy Films
- Distributed by: Circle Collective
- Release dates: June 10, 2023 (LIFF); September 22, 2023 (United States)
- Running time: 70 minutes
- Country: United States
- Language: English
- Box office: $17,980

What Doesn't Float is a 2023 American anthology dark comedy film directed by Luca Balser from a screenplay by Shauna Fitzgerald. It features an ensemble cast including Pauline Chalamet, Keith Poulson, Larry Fessenden, Roger Howarth, Cindy De La Cruz, Joel Nagle, Declan Eells, Joseph Longo, Chanel and Dior Umoh, Lily Sondik, Amir Royale and Alexandra Templer. The film tells seven different stories taking place in New York City.

What Doesn't Float premiered at the Lighthouse International Film Festival on June 10, 2023, and began a theatrical release via Circle Collective in the United States on September 22, 2023.

== Synopsis ==
“Seven stories. One city. A group of characters fill out this darkly comedic anthology of New Yorkers at their wits end. When the dailiness of urban life is suspended by unforeseen conflict, each character must make a decision. While the outcomes vary, a unified sense of the city emerges: New York becomes a mirror to the ego reflecting our true character, while the rest sinks to the bottom.”

== Cast ==
- Pauline Chalamet as Alex
- Cindy De La Cruz as Ema
- Joel Nagle as Mike
- Larry Fessenden as Marco
- Roger Howarth as Paddle Boarder
- Declan Eells as Dimitri
- Joseph Longo as Pat
- Chanel and Dior Umoh as Alice
- Keith Poulson as Jason
- Lily Sondik as Maggie
- Amir Royale as Luke
- Alexandra Templer as Jane

== Production ==
=== Development ===
Writer Shauna Fitzgerald and producer Pauline Chalamet were at dinner, having a conversation about the weird things that make New York City "unlivable", director Luca Balser happened to pass by, and joined the conversation. The three of them realized they could make a film about their experiences living in the city. Although the stories are often dark, Balser and Fitzgerald thought it was very important to find the humor in them, as it was "the only way to get over these moments in life." The story that star Chalamet was based on a real experience, Fitzgerald observed, where the motorcyclist actually jumped in the water. The goldfish story was based on an article they read about a similar event, "It was the perfect story, but ours is a little bit darker," Balser said. The anthology format was inspired by the 2014 film Wild Tales, and the fact, that it would be cheaper to shoot one story at a time.

To make the movie Balser, Chalamet, and co-producer Rachel Walden, needed an LLC for the money they used for filming. They filed the LLC in Atlanta, where Walden is from, and created Gummy Films, which started as a collective and now functions as a production and post-production company, run by them.

=== Filming ===
The film began production in 2019, and was shot "piecemeal". Chalamet's vignette was shot in Red Hook, Brooklyn, and at Floyd Bennett Field, a World War II airport turned national park. They didn't have a permit to film inside, so they were kicked out multiple times: "We were like stealing the shot, leave, steal a shot here, move, steal the shot here," Balser recalled. They also filmed around Park Slope and other parts of the city. Due to budget constraints, and working on other projects, the film took four years to be released.

== Release ==
What Doesn't Float premiered at the Lighthouse International Film Festival on June 10, 2023. That same month Circle Collective acquired distribution rights to the film. It will begin a theatrical release in the United States on September 22, 2023. The film was granted a SAG-AFTRA interim agreement so lead actress Pauline Chalamet would be able to do promotion for it.

== Reception ==
IndieWire 's Christian Zilko gave the film a B− rating. On his review he said "Despite the film’s occasionally painful reliance on familiar indie film tropes, “What Doesn’t Float” is executed at a higher level than most of its microbudget competition." He noted the "elegant look" of the cinematography as well as the film structure, pointing out the "seamless transitions" between each vignette. Overall, Zilko thought that, "The stylistic flourishes that make a film recognizable as “indie” [...] are like salt for a young director [...] “What Doesn’t Float” never gets anywhere near the worst end of the spectrum, but Balser and Fitzgerald certainly over-season on multiple occasions." Shelagh Rowan-Legg of Screen Anarchy, said Fitzgerald's writing was "strong not only in what's in the narrative, but what's between the lines. More importantly, it gives the actors great depth to work with in exploring these characters", and thought the film could have featured, "one or two more stories". Lois Alter Mark from the Alliance of Women Film Journalists gave a positive review of the film, noting the "fresh and unusual" vignette structure and the richness of the characters, "It’s a real feat that each character feels so multi-dimensional when we only get to meet them for a few minutes. Their situations are raw and real, if not relatable, and these brief glimpses leave you wanting to know more."
