= One Man Dies a Million Times =

- Directed by: Jessica Oreck
- Starring: Alyssa Lozovskaya, Maksim Blinov, Vladimir Koshevoy
- Cinematography: Sean Price Williams
- Release dates: March 9, 2019 (South by Southwest); July 29, 2022 (Theatrical Premiere)
- Running time: 93 minutes
- Countries: United States, Russia

One Man Dies a Million Times is a 2019 Russian-language drama film with science-fiction elements directed by American filmmaker Jessica Oreck that premiered at the 2019 South by Southwest Film Festival.

== Plot ==
One Man Dies a Million Times transposes to the near future the true story of the world's first seed bank, the N. I. Vavilov Institute of Plant Genetic Resources, during the Siege of Leningrad, during which scientists preserved a massive inventory of edible seeds in the name of biodiversity while facing starvation.

In the film, a young couple, biologists Alyssa and Maksim are struggling to preserve the seed bank of the Vavilov Institute in a starving city of Leningrad of the war-torn Russia.

== Development ==
The film includes narration taken from writings by prominent figures who endured the siege of Leningrad, including Anna Akhmatova, Olga Berggolts, and Lydia Ginzburg. It is shot by cinematographer Sean Price Williams in a primarily black-and-white style reminiscent of Tarkovsky.

Oreck decided that this film would only be released in theaters, with no home-video release or sales to streaming services to honor the risks taken by the real-life on-screen subjects. After a planned May 2020 opening delayed due to COVID, the film began its theatrical release on July 29, 2022, at IFC Center in New York City.
