= The Sweet East =

2023 film by Sean Price Williams

- Theatrical release poster
- Directed by: Sean Price Williams
- Written by: Nick Pinkerton
- Produced by: Craig Butta; Alex Coco; Alex Ross Perry
- Starring: Talia Ryder; Earl Cave; Simon Rex; Ayo Edebiri; Jeremy O. Harris; Jacob Elordi; Rish Shah
- Cinematography: Sean Price Williams
- Edited by: Stephen Gurewitz
- Production companies: Marathon Street; Base 12
- Distributed by: Utopia
- Release dates: May 18, 2023 (Cannes); December 1, 2023 (United States)
- Running time: 104 minutes
- Country: United States
- Language: English
- Box office: $564,192

The Sweet East is a 2023 American satirical surrealist road film directed by Sean Price Williams in his directorial debut from a screenplay by Nick Pinkerton. It stars Talia Ryder, Earl Cave, Simon Rex, Ayo Edebiri, Jeremy O. Harris, Jacob Elordi and Rish Shah. The film follows a teenager from South Carolina who experiences the wider world on a picaresque adventure through the East Coast of the United States.

The Sweet East had its world premiere in the Directors' Fortnight section of the Cannes Film Festival on May 18, 2023. The film was released in the United States on December 1, 2023, by Utopia.

== Plot ==
High school senior Lillian Wade is on a class trip to Washington, D.C., until a local restaurant is attacked by an armed man who believes the establishment houses a secret pedophilia ring. She is led to safety by anarchist political activist Caleb, who brings her to a home where he lives with other dissidents. Caleb and his friends bring Lillian along to a protest, only to discover that they traveled to the wrong location. While there, she meets Lawrence, a far-right university professor and Nazi sympathizer, who offers to let her stay with him at his home.

Lillian sends word to a friend that she is safe but does not plan to return home. She sees news reports that there is a police manhunt for her, with fears that she has been kidnapped. While at Lawrence's house, Lillian witnesses him meeting with a skinhead, who gives him a large duffel bag. She convinces Lawrence to take her with him on a trip to New York City, bringing the bag with them. Lillian convinces him to rent a Manhattan hotel room and undresses in front of him.

The following day, Lillian sends Lawrence to buy her nail polish. While he is gone, she searches the bag and finds it full of cash; she takes the bag and leaves. As Lillian is fleeing from the hotel, she is stopped on the street by director Molly McNair and producer Matthew Sutter, who want to cast her in a film they are making. She gets the part and begins shooting, striking up a flirtation with her co-star Ian Reynolds, a famous actor.

Lillian is photographed by paparazzi walking with Ian, with the pictures published on the cover of a tabloid magazine. During the shoot one night, the skinhead arrives at the set searching for her and the money; he and other skinheads open fire and kill many members of the cast and crew, including Ian.

Lillian is rescued by crew member Mohammed (also known as "Mo"), who drives her to Vermont and hides her in a secluded barn on a property his brother Ahmad runs as an Islamic community. While she initially stays there for fear that the skinheads are still searching for her, she finds a newspaper that they have been captured by police, along with an assault rifle. Lillian plans to leave, but is seen by Ahmad, Mo, and others. She pretends to be a neighbor looking for a lost dog that escaped. She collapses from exhaustion while walking away by the roadside.

She awakens at a monastery, where she is told by a priest that she was rescued from freezing to death and that the police have been notified of her whereabouts. Upon returning home, Lillian finds that her classmates are now living very different lives than when she last saw them. As her family is distracted by TV news reports about a terrorist attack at a football stadium that has left tens of thousands dead, she leaves the house and smiles into the camera, while the US flag stands behind, wide open.

== Cast ==
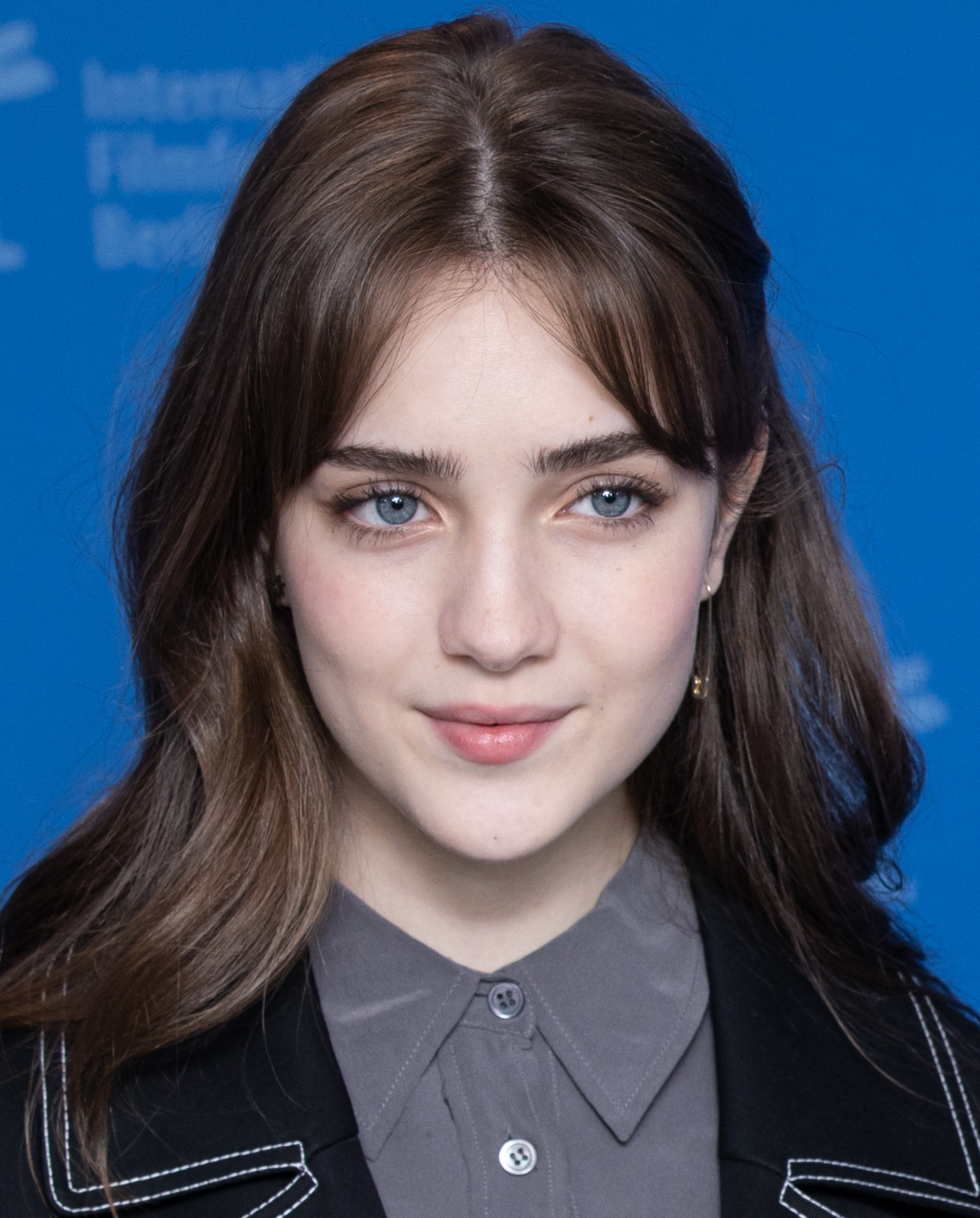
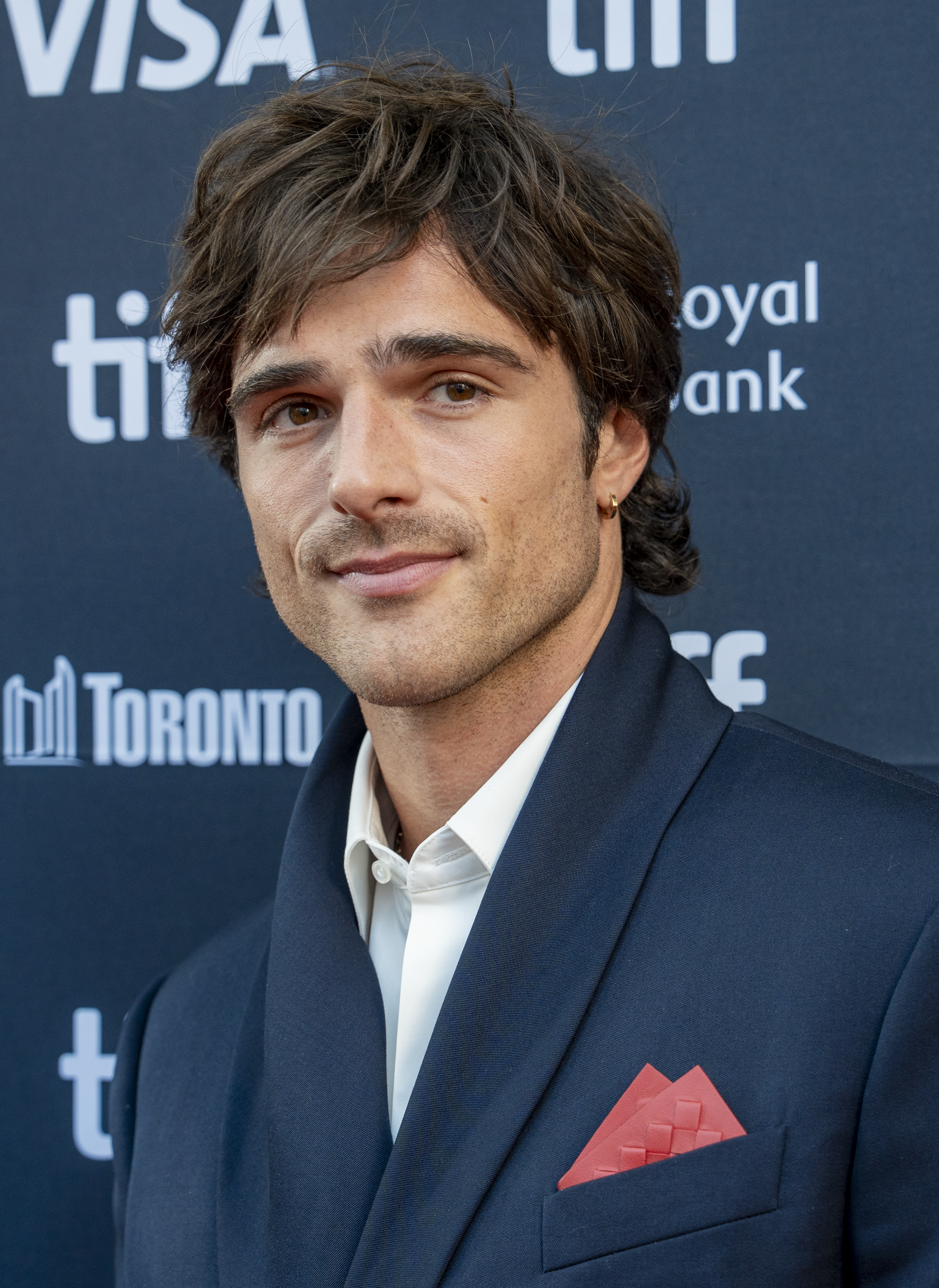
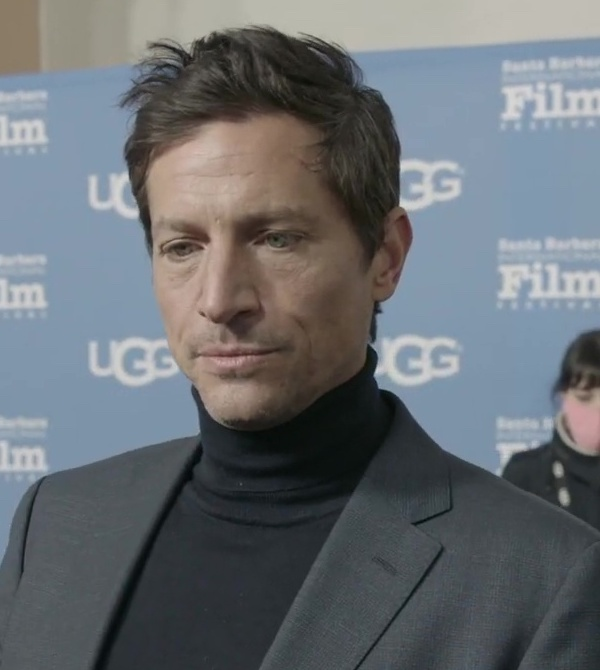
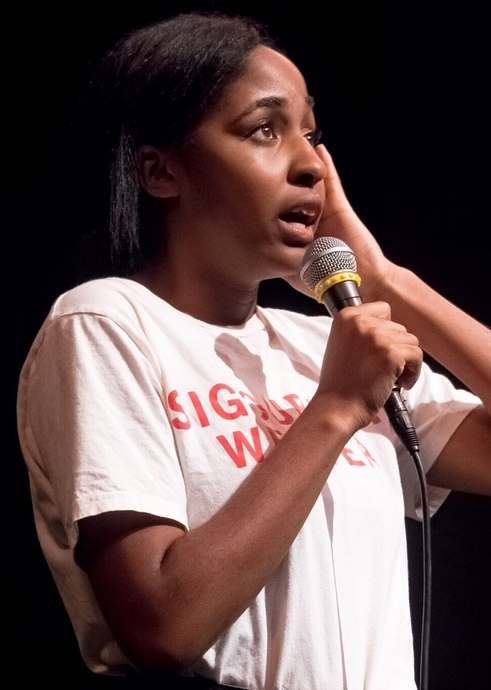
Clockwise: actors Talia Ryder, Jacob Elordi, Ayo Edebiri and Simon Rex
- Talia Ryder as Lillian
- Earl Cave as Caleb
- Simon Rex as Lawrence
- Ayo Edebiri as Molly
- Jeremy O. Harris as Matthew
- Jacob Elordi as Ian
- Rish Shah as Mohammed
- Gibby Haynes as Abbot
- Jack Irv as Troy
- Ella Rubin as Annabel
- Tess McMillan as Tessa
- Jamie Granato as tour guide
- Peter Vack as George Washington boy
- Betsey Brown as Betsy Ross girl
- Andy Milonakis as Jeff
- Mazin Akar as Ahmad
- MiMi Ryder as Cousin Claire
- Jonathan Daniel Brown as Mr. Franks

== Production ==
Sean Price Williams thought no one would give him money to make his directorial debut, until Alex Ross Perry used his agency connections to secure the cast in order to gain financing. After reading the screenplay, the film's executive producer, Jimmy Kaltreider, also provided some financing for the film via a small fund from Peter Thiel.

The Sweet East was shot on 16 mm film by Williams, who was the film's cinematographer in addition to director. The film was shot seasonally over the course of several months. Half of the film was shot in October 2021, and the other half was shot in May 2022.

The character of Jeff was originally going to be played by Eddie Deezen, but he was not available as he was in jail. Pete Davidson then agreed to perform the role, but had to cancel due to a scheduling conflict. The role ultimately went to Andy Milonakis.

The film makes use of several different film techniques and special effects. The Schüfftan process in particular is used in a shot later in the film.

== Release ==
The Sweet East had its world premiere in the Directors' Fortnight section of the Cannes Film Festival on May 18, 2023. It was also screened at the New York Film Festival on October 10, 2023. Utopia acquired North American distribution rights to the film in July 2023. It premiered at the IFC Center in New York City on December 1, 2023, followed by a national rollout. The film was released on Hulu on May 17, 2024.

== Reception ==
On the review aggregator website Rotten Tomatoes, 81% of 69 critics' reviews are positive, with an average rating of 6.9/10. The website's consensus reads: "A consistently amusing satire of modern American life, The Sweet East is so engaging from moment to moment that it's easy to forgive its somewhat hazy thesis." Metacritic, which uses a weighted average, assigned the film a score of 62 out of 100, based on 20 critics, indicating "generally favorable" reviews.

Carlos Losilla of Caimán Cuadernos de Cine wrote, "The Sweet East mixes Lewis Carroll with the Rivette of Céline and Julie vont en bateau, to jump to the other side of the mirror and contemplate, despite everything, what remains of the American dream."
