= Pavlovsk Experimental Station =

Agricultural science facility in Russia

Coordinates: 59.7143°N 30.4236°E

Pavlovsk Experimental Station (Russian: Павловская опытная станция) is an agricultural experiment station and gene bank that is part of the Institute of Plant Industry and situated in Pavlovsk near St. Petersburg, Russia.

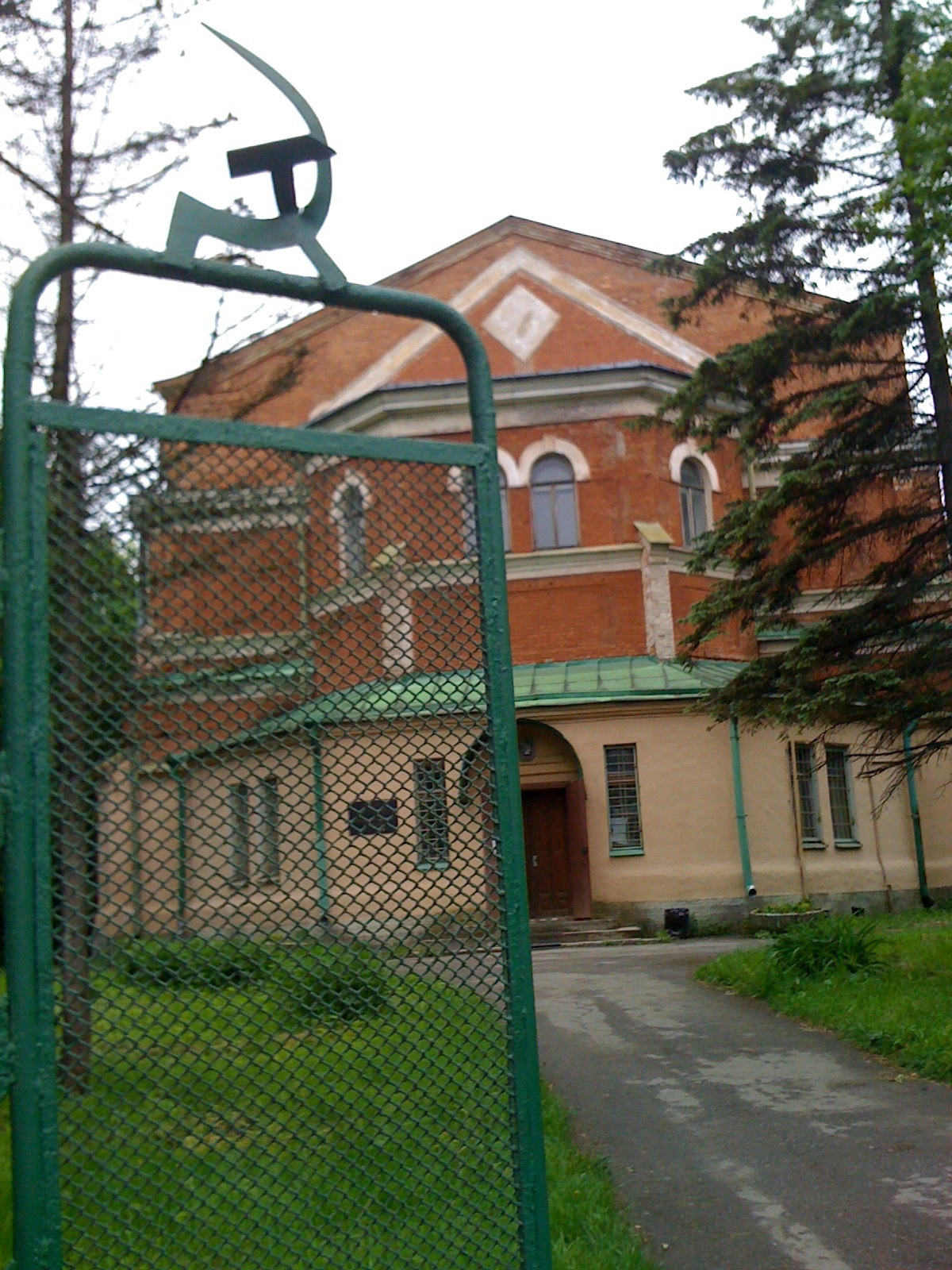
One of the Pavlovsk Station buildings. Many of the varieties at Pavlovsk are stored not as seeds in a vault but as plants in a field.

== History ==
It was started in 1926 by agricultural scientist Nikolai Vavilov and contains an extensive collection of more than 5,000 varieties of fruits and berries.

The Pavlovsk station's collection contains more than 100 varieties each of gooseberries, raspberries, and cherries. It also contains more than 1,000 varieties of strawberries. More than 90% of the collection is found in no other research collection or genebank.

The collection is a field genebank, meaning that the varieties are stored as plants in the ground. Most of the species concerned do not breed true from seeds, and so the varieties cannot be stored as seeds.

The Pavlovsk station itself fell into German hands during the Siege of Leningrad in 1941–1944, but prior to the arrival of German troops, scientists from the Institute of Plant Industry were able to move much of the station's tuber collection to a location within the city. Twelve of these scientists died of starvation while protecting the institute's edible collection of tubers and seeds.

In 2010 the experimental station faced an uncertain future, because the land it sits on was being sold to a developer who planned to build private homes on the site. If this planned development had gone forward, much of the collection would have been lost. Due to technical issues and quarantine regulations, it would not have been feasible to move the collection before demolition of the station was slated to have begun. in 2010 President Dmitry Medvedev announced via Twitter that the issue would be "scrutinised". Prime Minister Vladimir Putin had not yet responded to public calls to save the experimental station and its collection by the end of 2010. However, in April 2012 the Russian government took formal action to preserve this important genetic repository and stop the land from being conveyed to private interests for development.

== In popular culture ==
Hunger by American writer Elise Blackwell, is a fictionalized retelling of the plight of the scientists who starved to death while protecting the gene bank's edible seed and tuber collection during the Siege of Leningrad.

The song "When the War Came," by the band The Decemberists, tells the story of these scientists, with one verse saying "We made our oath to Vavilov / We'd not betray the Solanum / The acres of asteraceae / To our own pangs of starvation."
