= Lemon Tree (2023 film) =

- Release poster
- Directed by: Rachel Walden
- Written by: Rachel Walden
- Produced by: Pauline Chalamet; Luca Balser; Chad Tennies; Mac Grant; Josh Jason; Lilian Givens; Bennett Givens
- Starring: Gordon Rocks; Charlie Robinson
- Cinematography: Hunter Zimny
- Edited by: Luca Balser; Trae Hawkins
- Music by: Marcus Dembinski
- Production companies: Gummy Films; Resolve Media Group
- Release date: May 24, 2023 (Directors' Fortnight)
- Running time: 17 minutes
- Country: United States
- Language: English

Lemon Tree is a 2023 American short film written and directed by Rachel Walden, based on a true story told to Walden by her grandfather. In the story Walden's grandfather went on a road trip gone wrong with his father on the way back from Disney World. It stars Gordon Rocks, as the Son and Charlie Robinson as the Father. The story follows a teenager whose father steals a rabbit at a carnival to impress him, and subsequently has to try to get all three of them home.

Development for the seventeen-minute short started in 2021, when Walden presented the idea to fellow Gummy Films' founders, Pauline Chalamet and Luca Balser, who joined as producers. It was shot on 16mm Kodak film, in Long Island and upstate New York, and did not follow a conventional script, being entirely improvised. Aside from lead Gordon Rocks, the cast was composed of non-professional actors.

Lemon Tree premiered on May 24, 2023 at the Cannes Directors' Fortnight, since then, the film has been presented in numerous international film festivals, including the Stockholm Film Festival and the Ghent International Film Festival.

== Plot ==
A young father steals a magician's rabbit at a Halloween carnival to impress his son. The thrill of the petty theft quickly dissipates when the son is tasked with getting himself, his new pet and his father home.

== Cast ==
- Gordon Rocks as The Son
- Charlie Robinson as The Dad
- Robin Channing as The Magician
- Jordan Alexander as The Carnie
- Emily Constantino as The Apple Stand Girl
- Leyla Nuritova as The Diner Waitress

== Production ==
=== Development ===
Walden was inspired to write the script, after hearing her grandfather tell the story about a road trip he had gone on with his own father as a kid. In the story, her grandfather was given a little orange tree, during a father-son road trip on the way back from Disney World, his dad started drinking heavily, which led him to accidentally destroy his son's tree. Walden, who also grew up with an addict parent, felt the image of a tree being crushed by a father figure, "was a very honest image of what it feels like to grow up in a home where alcoholism or addiction is present." In 2021, Walden sent her fellow Gummy Films co-founders, Pauline Chalamet and Luca Balser, a one-page document re-telling her family's story. Chalamet thought it would make a "strong short film", even considering turning it into a feature-length film. Walden had the idea for almost eight years before making it, and credited Balser an Chalamet for pushing her to do it: "Luca and Pauline were like, okay, we’re doing this in the fall, what do you need from us to make it happen? They took away all my excuses". They worked from a visual outline, and there was no written dialogue.

=== Filming ===
Walden described the four-day low-budget production as "very flexible", with the short being shot on 16mm Kodak. Walden's wanted it to be done on film, because she had interest in capturing, "the memory of this event or evoking this kind of feeling that this is a retelling of an early experience of trauma as a child." Everything in the film was improvised, she recalled: "It was a lot of rehearsal. There’s no written dialogue". The director exchanged the tree from the original story, for a rabbit, as they thought it worked poetically on paper but, "we felt it didn’t have a lot of energy". Her team found a rabbit, at the last minute, and was not harmed during the production. At first, Walden wanted to go to Cherokee, North Carolina, but couldn't due to financial constraints. The carnival scenes were shot in Long Island, with the rest of the scenes being done in upstate New York. Gordon Rocks was the only professional actor on set, with the rest of the cast being formed by crew members.

== Release ==
The short film premiered on May 24, 2023 at the Cannes Directors' Fortnight.

== Future ==
Walden and Chalamet are using the short as proof of concept for a longer film, something Chalamet had intended from the start.

== Reception ==
Since its launch, the film has been selected in various festivals and academies around the world:

| Year | Festivals | Award/Category | Status |
|---|---|---|---|
| 2023 | Ghent International Film Festival | Best International Short Film | Nominated |
| 2023 | International Short Film Festival of Cyprus | Best International Short Film | Nominated |
| 2023 | Alice nella Città (Rome Film Fest) | Best Directing | Won |
| 2023 | Lobo Fest – Festival Internacional de Filmes | Best Short Film | Nominated |
| 2023 | SEMINCI | Best Short FIlm | Nominated |
| 2023 | Leeds International Film Festival | Best International Short Film | Nominated |
| 2023 | St. Louis International Film Festival | Best Narrative Short Film | Nominated |
| 2023 | Stockholm Film Festival | Bronze Horse Award for Best Short Film | Nominated |
