= Kim's Video and Music =

Music store in New York City

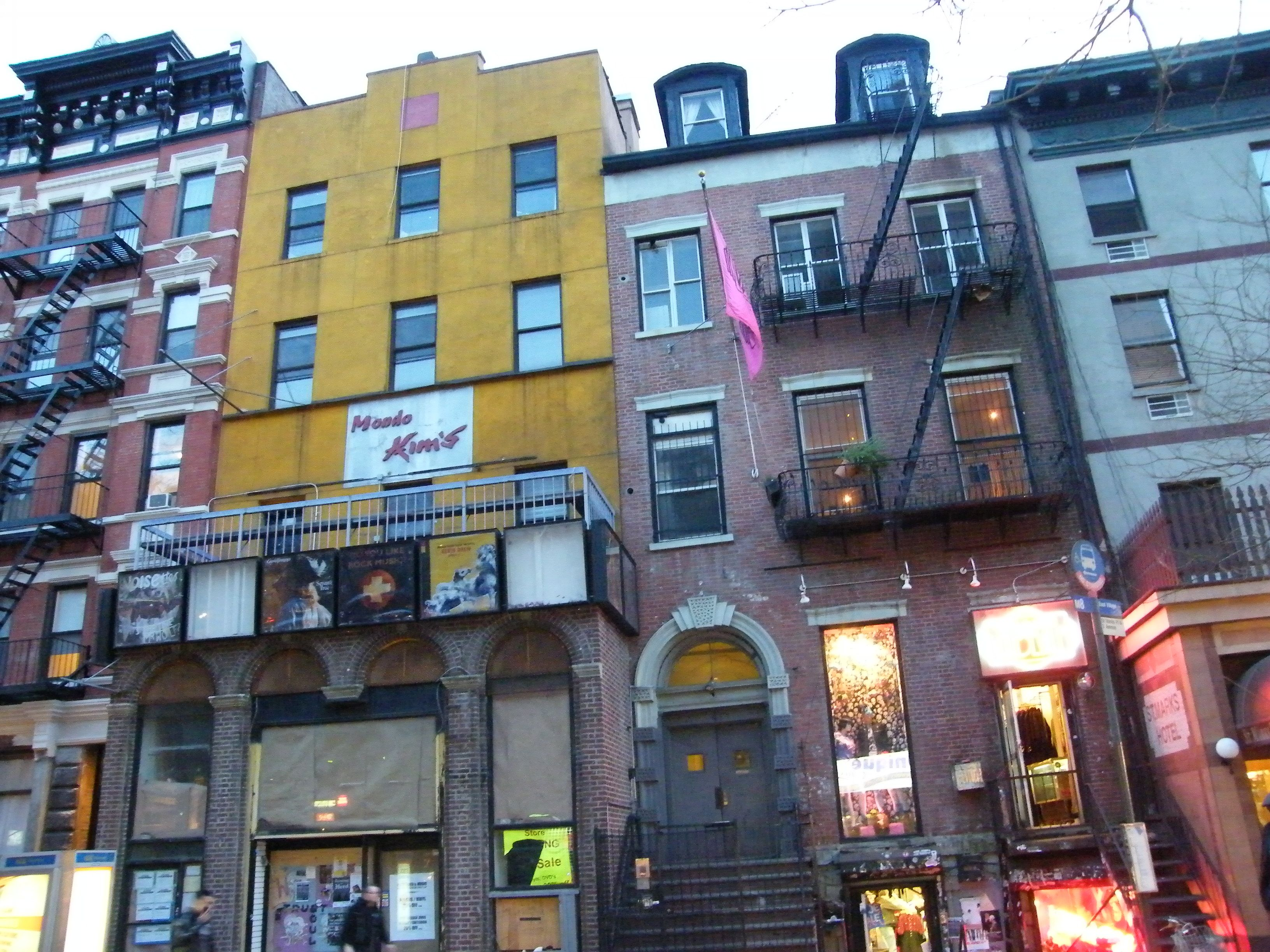
Boarded up store in 2009

Kim's Video and Music was a video and music retail store in Manhattan, New York City; the retailer was described as the "go-to place for rare selections," and was "widely known among the cognoscenti of new, experimental and esoteric music and film". At its peak, there were six locations around Manhattan. Its owner was Yongman Kim.

== History ==
The store opened at the site of Kim's dry-cleaning business, and eventually moved to its own location on Avenue A in 1987, which eventually closed in 2004.

It expanded to five other locations, including Mondo Kim's at 6 St. Mark's Place in the East Village, Kim's Underground at 144 Bleecker Street on Laguardia Place, Kim's West at 350 Bleecker Street & West 10th Street, and Kim's Mediapolis at 2906 Broadway.

The last remaining location of Kim's Video & Music, located on 1st Avenue, announced its closure on April 21, 2014.

=== Mondo Kim's ===
Mondo Kim's at 6 St. Mark's Place was the most famous of the branch locations. Formerly, the building was the home of the New St. Marks Baths from 1913 to 1985. In June 2005, police raided Mondo Kim's, alleging they were selling bootlegs. To a lesser extent, it also had a reputation for "ornery" and rude service.

By 2008, Mondo Kim's had over 55,000 rental titles, many of which were rare or esoteric. In September of that year, Kim announced he would be closing Mondo Kim's and giving away the film collection to anyone who could fulfill certain criteria, stipulating that the entire collection was to be taken intact and that Kim's members would continue to have access to the collection wherever it resided. In December 2008, it was reported that the town of Salemi, Sicily had made a successful bid for the collection, as part of a village restoration effort.

In 2012, a Village Voice article entitled "The Strange Fate of Kim's Video" reported that the collection, though remaining intact, had essentially disappeared from public view after arriving in Salemi, and that the initiatives promised by Kim and the government of Salemi remained unfulfilled.

=== Documentary ===
On April 1, 2022, filmmakers David Redmon and Ashley Sabin, with assistance from Yongman Kim and Tim League, brought the Kim's Video St. Mark's Place movie collection back to New York City, after 12 years of being stored in Salemi. Redmon and Sabin chronicled this in their 2023 movie Kim's Video. Kim's Video & Music was relaunched as Kim's Video Underground with the help of the Alamo Drafthouse Cinema theater chain. The new store is located in the lobby of Alamo's Lower Manhattan location in the Financial District of Manhattan. The store also now offers 5-day rentals for free.

== Notable employees ==
Kim's was known for its staff, who were described by The Awl as "legendarily knowledgeable and haughty." Some of its employees later went on to successful careers in film, music, and the arts.

- Isabel Gillies, actress, writer
- Dawn Eden Goldstein, writer
- Robert Greene, documentary filmmaker
- Albert Hammond Jr., musician, member of The Strokes
- Alex Ross Perry, director, screenwriter
- Todd Phillips, director, producer, screenwriter
- Dylan Kidd, director, screenwriter
- Christopher Pravdica, musician, member of Swans
- Kate Lyn Sheil, actress
- Chris Vanderloo, founder of Other Music
- Sean Price Williams, cinematographer
- Andrew W.K., musician
- Nick Zedd, filmmaker
- Eric Copeland, musician and member of Black Dice
- Michael M. Bilandic, filmmaker
- Jacqueline Castel, filmmaker
- Wesley Morris, Pulitzer Prize-winning critic at The New York Times
- Chris Ryan, editorial director at The Ringer
- Kat Toledo, comedian and filmmaker
- Ben Apatoff, Bloomsbury Publishing author
- Jody Avirgan, podcast host and producer
- Brian Turner, former WFMU music and program director and DJ
