= Impolex =

2009 film by Alex Ross Perry

- Official poster
- Directed by: Alex Ross Perry
- Written by: Alex Ross Perry
- Produced by: Alex Ross Perry
- Starring: Riley O'Bryan; Kate Lyn Sheil; Bruno Meyrick Jones; Ben Shapiro; Roy Berkeley; Eugene Mirman
- Cinematography: Sean Price Williams
- Edited by: Alex Ross Perry
- Music by: Preston Spurlock
- Production company: Impolex Productions
- Release dates: June 11, 2009 (Cinevegas Film Festival); July 15, 2011 (United States)
- Running time: 73 minutes
- Country: United States
- Language: English

Impolex is a 2009 American film written, produced, edited and directed by Alex Ross Perry in his feature directorial debut. It stars Riley O'Bryan, Kate Lyn Sheil, Ben Shapiro, Bruno Meyrick Jones, Roy Berkeley, Brandon Prince and Eugene Mirman. The film is inspired by Thomas Pynchon's 1973 novel Gravity's Rainbow.

== Plot ==
Tyrone (Riley O'Bryan) embarks upon a journey into frustration, trying to locate German V-2 rockets at the end of World War II.

== Cast ==
- Riley O'Bryan as Tyrone S.
- Kate Lyn Sheil as Katie
- Bruno Meyrick Jones as Adrian the Pirate
- Ben Shapiro as Robinson
- Roy Berkeley as Lazlo
- Eugene Mirman as Talking Octopus

== See also ==
- List of American films of 2009
