= Pauline Chalamet =

French–American actress (born 1992)

- Born: Pauline Hope Chalamet; January 25, 1992 (age 34); New York City, U.S.
- Citizenship: United States; France
- Education: Bard College
- Occupations: Actress; producer
- Years active: 1999–present
- Partner: Rhys Raiskin
- Children: 1
- Relatives: Timothée Chalamet (brother); Rodman Flender (uncle)

Pauline Hope Chalamet (born January 25, 1992) is an American and French actress. She made her feature film debut in Judd Apatow's comedy The King of Staten Island (2020). From 2021 to 2025, she starred in the HBO Max comedy series The Sex Lives of College Girls.

Chalamet is a co-founder of the production company Gummy Films, set up in 2019. Through the company, she has co-produced and starred in the dark comedy film What Doesn't Float (2023) along with several short films including Lemon Tree (2024) that was selected at Cannes Directors' Fortnight.

== Early life ==
Chalamet was born in New York City, the first child of Nicole Flender and Marc Chalamet, and grew up in the federally subsidized artists' building Manhattan Plaza, in Hell's Kitchen under the Mitchell–Lama program. Her younger brother is actor Timothée Chalamet. Her mother, Nicole Flender, is a third-generation New Yorker, of half Russian Jewish and half Austrian Jewish descent. Pauline was raised Jewish. Flender is a real estate broker at The Corcoran Group, and a former Broadway dancer. Flender earned her bachelor's degree in French from Yale University, and has been a language and dance teacher. Her French father, Marc Chalamet, is an editor for the UNICEF and New York correspondent for Le Parisien. Marc Chalamet is from Nîmes and is of a Protestant Christian background. Pauline's paternal grandmother, who had moved to France, was originally from Brantford, Ontario. On her mother's side, she is a niece of husband-and-wife filmmakers and producers Rodman Flender and Amy Lippman. She was named after the Éric Rohmer film Pauline at the Beach. Chalamet has described her family as "very middle-class".

Chalamet is bilingual in English and French. She spent her summers in Le Chambon-sur-Lignon, in Haute-Loire, at the house of her paternal grandparents, which led her to incorporate some French customs into her life. She loved France so much that as a teenager, she asked her father not to answer her if she spoke in English to him. As a child, Chalamet started taking piano lessons, which she continued until she graduated high school. In 2001, she began taking classes at the School of American Ballet, and at age 10, danced in a Broadway production of A Midsummer Night's Dream. She also trained at Studio Maestro and the Rosella Hightower dance school in Mougins, South of France. Chalamet attended the School of American Ballet until 2010, after a biking accident hindered any chances of furthering her dancing career. Although she was ambivalent about a career in acting, she recalls seeing Liev Schreiber act in Talk Radio in 2006 as a pivotal moment in her decision. After going to PS87 William T. Sherman for elementary school, Chalamet attended the private United Nations International School from fourth to sixth grade, where most of her classes were in French, as her parents were considering moving to France. She was later accepted at Fiorello H. LaGuardia High School, where she majored in drama, and graduated in 2010.

At first, she rejected the idea of going to college, but finally applied to Bard College, where she double majored in theater and political science, graduating in 2014. While studying, Chalamet worked at the school library and helped out at a farm to pay off her student loans.

She interned at International Crisis Group, and for a while thought of becoming a human-rights lawyer, but quickly discarded the idea. After college, Chalamet worked various odd jobs, including bartending, copyediting, and babysitting, while writing in her free time. She decided to move to Paris without her family's knowledge. "I told my family after I had signed a lease", she has said. She attended Cours Florent but was disappointed with the experience. In 2016, she was accepted for an acting apprenticeship at the Studio Théâtre d'Asnières, where she regained her interest in acting. While in Paris, she got a New York City-based agent, and auditioned while visiting her family.

== Career ==
=== 1999–2020: Early roles ===
Chalamet started her career with small roles in television shows such as One Life to Live and Royal Pains. Since 2016, she has worked in short films like Je Suis Mes Actes and Between Fear and Laughter, which she wrote and directed. In 2017, she wrote Agnes et Milane, directed by Tristan Tilloloy, appeared in Margot, and starred in Gravats by Hong Kai Lai. She also starred in the Canadian television pilot La Ville. In 2018, she wrote the short The Group Chat and appeared in En Ville. In 2019, Chalamet wrote another short, Entre Deux Mondes, directed by Myriam Doumenq, and starred as Marion in Comme des Grands, directed by Ania Gauer and Julien Gauthier, for which she won the Best Actress Award at the IndieXFilmFest section of the Los Angeles International Film Festival. The next year, she starred in another three short films: Je Suis la Nouvelle Adjani by Khady N'Diaye, Seasick by Lindsey Ryan, and Canines by Abel Danan, which was selected for the Festival international du film fantastique de Gérardmer.

=== 2020–present ===
In 2019, Chalamet was cast as Joanne in the Judd Apatow comedy The King of Staten Island, which premiered in 2020. That same year, she co-founded the production company Gummy Films with Rachel Walden and Luca Balser. In 2020, she appeared as Sveta in two episodes of the French webseries Les Engagés. On October 14, 2020, Variety reported that Chalamet was set to star as Kimberly, "the valedictorian of a working-class public high school in a humble Arizona suburb", in Mindy Kaling's comedy The Sex Lives of College Girls for HBO Max. The series premiered on November 18, 2021, with the second season being released on November 17, 2022.

In 2023, through Gummy Films, Chalamet co-produced the short film Lemon Tree, directed by fellow founder Rachel Walden. The short premiered during Cannes' Directors' Fortnight. She starred in the film What Doesn't Float, which she also co-produced, directed by Gummy Films' co-founder Luca Balser. The film premiered on June 10, 2023, at the Lighthouse International Film Festival. In September 2023, Chalamet starred in the Meet Cute podcast series Kerri, and was honored by the Creative Coalition at the 2023 Television Humanitarian Awards.

She appeared as Paola in Iris Brey's Split, a French television series, alongside Alma Jodorowsky and Jehnny Beth. The show premiered on November 24, 2023. Sex is Comedy, a documentary based on the work done by the intimacy coordinator on the show, also featured Chalamet.

In 2024, she appeared as Leah in Nathan Silver's comedy film, Between the Temples. David Ehrlich of IndieWire, described her cameo in the film as "laugh-out-loud", while Laura Bradley of The Daily Beast, called it "gloriously twisted." In 2025, Chalamet produced and starred in the short film Tell Me More alongside Ruth Negga and Irène Jacob. The film, made in collaboration with French fashion brand Patou, was directed by Chalamet's partner, Rhys Raiskin and was inspired by the films of the French New Wave in particular the Agnès Varda film Cleo from 5 to 7 (1962). As a member of the Creative Coalition, Chalamet joined other actors on Capitol Hill to meet with members of congress to advocate for funding the National Endowment for the Arts. She further defended the program on an op-ed for The Hollywood Reporter.

Chalamet will next appear in Steve Pink's thriller, Terrestrial, alongside Jermaine Fowler. She also serves as producer through Gummy Films. She also appears in The Devil Wears Prada 2, a sequel to the 2006 comedy-drama film The Devil Wears Prada. Chalamet is set to star in Switch an independent series, alongside Coral Peña. In February 2024, she began filming Antonin Peretjatko's next film, as of yet untitled.

== Personal life ==
As of 2024, Chalamet split her time between Paris and Los Angeles. She is in a relationship with director Rhys Raiskin. In June 2024, it was announced that Chalamet was pregnant with their first child. In September 2024, it was confirmed that she had given birth to a girl earlier that month in Paris.

Chalamet is an avid reader and has cited Alexandre Dumas's The Count of Monte Cristo as her favorite book. Politically, she has described herself as "pro-socialism".

== Filmography ==
=== Film ===
Key
| † | Denotes films that have not yet been released |

| Year | Title | Role | Notes |
|---|---|---|---|
| 2020 | The King of Staten Island | Joanne | |
| 2021 | Adulting | Marion | Short film |
| 2021 | After Dark | Ronnie | Short film |
| 2022 | Evil Seaweed | N/A | Short film |
| 2023 | The Appraisal | April | Short film, associate producer |
| 2023 | Lemon Tree | – | Short film, producer |
| 2023 | What Doesn't Float | Alex | Also producer |
| 2024 | Between the Temples | Leah | |
| 2024 | Tell Me More | Performer | Short film; also producer |
| 2025 | Terrestrial | Maddie | |
| 2026 | The Devil Wears Prada 2 | Ilana Poole | |
| TBA | Old Mission | | Post-production |

=== Television ===
| Year | Title | Role | Notes |
|---|---|---|---|
| 1999 | One Life to Live | Emma Doyle | Episode: "#1.7809" |
| 2009 | Royal Pains | Lead Ballerina | Episode: "There Will Be Food" |
| 2020 | Acting for a Cause | Helena | Episode: "A Midsummer Night’s Dream" |
| 2021 | Les Engagés | Sveta | 2 episodes |
| 2021–2025 | The Sex Lives of College Girls | Kimberly | Main role |
| 2023 | Split | Paola | Recurring role |
| 2025 | American Dad! | N/A | Episode: "The Mystery of the Missing Bazooka Shark Babe" |

=== Podcasts ===
| Year | Title | Voice role | Notes | Ref. |
|---|---|---|---|---|
| 2023 | Meet Cute: Kerri | Kerri | | |

== Awards and nominations ==
| Award | Year | Nominated work | Category | Result | Reference |
|---|---|---|---|---|---|
| Independent Shorts Awards | 2020 | Adulting | Best Acting Duo (shared with Dylan Raffin) | Won | |
| Milan Gold Awards | 2021 | Adulting | Best Actress | Won | |
| Chicago Indie Film Awards | 2021 | Adulting | Best Actress | Won | |
| New York Indie Shorts Awards | 2021 | Seasick | Best Actress | Won | |
