= Jessica Oreck =

American filmmaker

Jessica Oreck is an American naturalist and documentary filmmaker.

She studied filmmaking and biology in school, and then started working at the American Museum of Natural History in New York City. After some time she established the one-person Myriapod production company for her films, as she said, "as a way for me to make films without having to put my name on everything".

In 2021 Oreck launched a tiny museum "Office of Collecting, and Design". In 2024 she decided to expand it to a "traveling museum" in a trailer.

== Filmography ==
- Beetle Queen Conquers Tokyo (2008). It was her first film; nominated for an Independent Spirit Award in 2010, received the Spotlight Award (2010) from the Cinema Eye Honors
- Venus (2011, short)
- Mysteries of Vernacular (2012) A series of shorts for TED-Ed about the origins of some words.
- Aatsinki: The Story of Arctic Cowboys (2013)
- The Vanquishing of the Witch Baba Yaga (2014)
- One Man Dies a Million Times (2019). The film is retelling the true story of the world's first seed bank, the N. I. Vavilov Institute of Plant Genetic Resources, during the Siege of Leningrad, during which scientists preserved a massive inventory of edible seeds in the name of biodiversity while facing starvation.
- Memoirs of Vegetation (2020, short)
