= The Color Wheel =

2011 film by Alex Ross Perry

- Theatrical release poster by Anna Bak-Kvapil
- Directed by: Alex Ross Perry
- Written by: Carlen Altman; Alex Ross Perry
- Produced by: Bob Byington; Alex Ross Perry
- Starring: Alex Ross Perry; Carlen Altman; Bob Byington; Kate Lyn Sheil; Ry Russo-Young
- Cinematography: Sean Price Williams
- Edited by: Alex Ross Perry
- Music by: Preston Spurlock
- Distributed by: Factory 25
- Release dates: April 1, 2011 (Wisconsin Film Festival); May 18, 2012 (United States)
- Country: United States
- Language: English

Director Alex Ross Perry discussing The Color Wheel and the film industry in 2011

The Color Wheel is a 2011 American independent film co-written, co-produced, edited, directed by and co-starring Alex Ross Perry. Perry co-wrote the film with Carlen Altman, who both also play the respective lead roles.

A screwball black comedy, the film follows adult siblings J.R. (Altman) and Colin (Perry) as they undertake a road trip to move J.R.'s belongings out of the home of her former lover and college professor (Bob Byington). Shot on black-and-white 16mm film, the film is noted for its unusual and abrasive style, rapid-fire dialogue, and dark plot.

After premiering at festivals in 2011, the film was named the best undistributed film of the year by the Indiewire and Village Voice polls, and placed 12th in a similar poll conducted by Film Comment.

The Color Wheel was released in a limited release in the United States on May 18, 2012, by Factory25.

== Plot ==
Colin lives with his girlfriend Zoe. His troubled sister JR visits him asking for a favor. JR is an aspiring news anchor and asks Colin to accompany her on a road trip to pick up her belongings from her ex-boyfriend, Neil Chadwick. Neil is a broadcasting professor at the college JR went to. Neil and JR lived together until they broke up and JR dropped out of school. Colin begrudgingly agrees to help JR. During the trip they constantly bicker and argue with each other, revealing that JR's relationship with her parents is dysfunctional.

Colin and JR arrive at a motel to spend the night. The motel owner will only allow married couples to share a room due to the owner's religious convictions. Colin and JR tell him they are married in order to fool him. The owner is still skeptical so JR kisses Colin. Later, Colin vomits grossed out from the kiss. The next day they arrive at Neil's place. JR is surprised to find another girl, who appears to be a student, is in a relationship with Neil. Before Colin helps JR pickup her belongings from Neil. They engage in a dramatic verbal exchange with Neil.

Later JR notices famous broadcaster Ms. Wagner in a diner. She tries to ask her for career advice, but Ms. Wagner blows her off. Leaving from the diner, JR coincidentally meets her old best friend Julia. Julia is with her friend, Kim, who is Colin's childhood crush. Julia convinces JR to come to her party promising a TV agent that Julia is friends with will be there. JR agrees to come to the party and convinces Colin to come by reminding him that Kim will be there.

At the party, the TV agent does not show up and JR has difficulty getting along with her former friends, who seem to have more successful lives than her. Meanwhile, Colin gets into a fight with some guys at the party. After Colin recovers, he makes out with Kim. JR walks into the room where Colin is making out, and they engage in a heated argument with Kim. Colin later vomits, grossed out by Kim.

After the party JR and Colin stop bickering and arguing with each other and connect emotionally. They then passionately kiss and fall asleep; it is implied that they later have sex. The next day, they part as JR drops Colin off at Zoe's house. As JR is about to leave in her car, the front door of the house briefly opens, hinting that Colin is about to come back outside.

== Production ==
Director Alex Ross Perry first met Carlen Altman at a stand-up comedy show where both were performing. The two became friends, and later co-wrote the screenplay for The Color Wheel. Perry has stated that film was influenced by the novels of Philip Roth, which he was reading while working on the script. Perry wrote the first draft of the script on his own before passing it along to Altman to re-write.

The film was shot on black-and-white 16mm film. Production took eighteen days. Unlike many contemporary independent film productions, the film features almost no improvisation and was extensively rehearsed beforehand.

The Color Wheel had its world premiere on 14 April 2011 at the Sarasota Film Festival. It played in competition at the Locarno Film Festival, and was also screened at the Vancouver International Film Festival, Maryland Film Festival, and Ljubljana International Film Festival. The film shared the prize for Best Narrative Feature Film at the 2011 Chicago Underground Film Festival.

== Reception ==
Prior to its 2012 theatrical release, The Color Wheel was named the best undistributed film of 2011 by the Indiewire and Village Voice polls of film critics, and placed 12th in a similar poll conducted by Film Comment. Since its release, the film has received both strongly positive and strongly negative responses from critics. On the review aggregator website Rotten Tomatoes, 79% of 28 critics' reviews are positive. The website's consensus reads: "The Color Wheel takes audiences along for a darkly entertaining ride, getting a surprising amount of mileage from utterly unlikable central characters along the way." Metacritic, which uses a weighted average, assigned the film a score of 53 out of 100, based on 9 critics, indicating "mixed or average" reviews.

A.O. Scott of The New York Times wrote that the film was "sly, daring, genuinely original and at times perversely brilliant", while also stating that it was "a singularly unpleasant movie" that had "scramble[d his] signals ... effectively, overriding deeply ingrained habits of response and judgment." Eric Kohn of Indiewire praised the film, writing that it was "a sheer delight of sarcasm and uneasy wit."

Writing in The Village Voice, Nick Pinkerton described The Color Wheel as "a movie that's consistently unafraid to get confrontational and plain weird, with Colin's is-it-or-isn't-it-ironic racism, abrupt smothering close-ups, and scenes pushed past the boundaries of plausible motivation until they nosedive into absurdity. Like Howard Hawks's Twentieth Century, it's a travelogue movie about a couple whose impossible, porcupine personalities leave them safe, finally, for nobody's company but each other's." In his personal blog, MSN film critic Glenn Kenny stated that "there's a sense in which the unpleasantness of the characters, all of the characters, is so oppressively overwhelming that one gets a sense of an Ionesco-style absurdism put into a contemporary hyperdrive, with a bit of sneering near-Letterist technical crudity thrown in. The effect, at certain other times, is of a Which Way to the Front?-era Jerry-Lewis-written-and-starring incest comedy directed by Carnival Of Souls' Herk Harvey."

David Edelstein of New York Magazine chose the film as a Critic's Pick, citing it as "the most entertaining unpleasant film I’ve seen in years." For a New York Times feature on the film, Cahiers du Cinéma editor Stéphane Delorme wrote that the film "reminds us of a New York independent cinema that we loved — black and white, shot on film, spontaneous, with funny and intelligent dialogue — and that seemed to no longer exist." Wesley Morris of The Boston Globe similarly praised the film, writing: "There aren’t enough of these truly independent movies anymore." A notable early champion of the film was critic Ignatiy Vishnevetsky, who was the first to write about The Color Wheel during its festival run. Vishnevetsky wrote that, "despite (or maybe because of?) its detours into broad comedy, The Color Wheel manages to invest both characters with vulnerability, depth and even a perverse dignity; it's better at being a drama than most dramas." Reviewing the film in Variety, Ronnie Scheib wrote: "Hard to swallow but impossible to ignore, this nihilistic comedy may emerge as a cult touchstone."

Other critics were not as impressed. Peter Keough of The Boston Phoenix gave the film 1 1/2 out of 4 stars, comparing the film unfavorably to The Puffy Chair and writing that "Alex Ross Perry's self-consciously coy indulgence reminds me of the work of Diablo Cody, but slighter and more irritating." Shawn Levy of The Oregonian complained about the film's style, writing: "There’s handmade and then there’s amateurish. This, alas, is the latter." David Fear of Time Out New York gave the film a negative review, writing that "Some will call The Color Wheel daring. Others will remember that it takes more than desperate shocks to add substance to the sloppy diddlings of a dilettante."

Even more negative was the review written by Ryan Brown for IonCinema.com, who stated: "The fact that the Brooklyn Academy of Music in New York could recently sanctify its movie screens with epiphanic Bresson and Zulawski retros, only to smear them now with a full week’s run of this tripe only goes to demonstrate how haywire and scatterbrained 21st century film culture has become. Maybe the most appalling thing about Perry’s movie is his obnoxious swipe at a truly great American film artist, Julian Schnabel, by conspicuously associating the character of a fatuous 'broadcasting' professor with a book of Schnabel’s paintings."
