= Owen Kline =

American actor and filmmaker

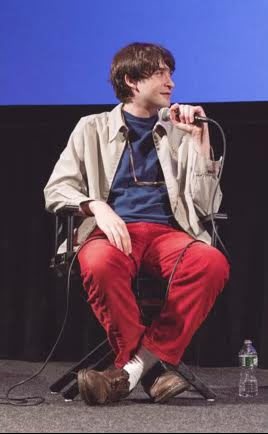
- Kline at the Walter Reade Theater in 2022
- Born: Owen Joseph Kline; October 14, 1991 (age 35); New York City, U.S.
- Occupations: Actor, filmmaker, cartoonist
- Years active: 2001–present
- Parents: Kevin Kline (father); Phoebe Cates (mother)
- Relatives: Greta Kline (sister); Gilbert Cates (great-uncle); Gil Cates Jr. (first cousin once removed)

Owen Joseph Kline (born October 14, 1991) is an American filmmaker, actor, and cartoonist. He is best known for his directorial debut Funny Pages (2022) and his performance as Frank Berkman in The Squid and the Whale (2005).

== Early life ==
Kline was born and raised in New York City, to actor Kevin Kline and actress Phoebe Cates. He has one younger sister, Greta Kline, a musician/singer-songwriter. At age 7, he fell ill, and during a two-week stay in the hospital was diagnosed with Type 1 diabetes. He acted in his adolescence in the independent films The Anniversary Party (2001) and Noah Baumbach’s The Squid and The Whale (2005), but did not pursue a subsequent career in acting, instead remaining in junior high school. He co-edited his high school's comic book magazine and self-published his own xeroxed comics, joke books and zines. He attended Pratt Institute in Brooklyn, New York, studying illustration and film.

He worked as an assistant to the archivist at New York film museum Anthology Film Archives, and for musicologists Billy Miller and Miriam Linna at their Norton label and Kicks Books imprint. Kline provided archival research for books, including Mark Newgarden and Paul Karasik's How to Read Nancy.

He crewed on early work of filmmakers Josh and Benny Safdie, and acted in their film John's Gone (2010), and in Michael M. Bilandic's films Hellaware (2013), Jobe'z World (2018), and Cabaret Boys (2026).

== Work ==
In 2013 Kline wrote and directed the short comedy Fowl Play, about a group of low-rent criminals fooled into buying a hen for a cockfight in Flushing, Queens. He co-wrote and directed the short film Jazzy for Joe (2014), a narrative comedy about, and starring, New York broadcaster Joe Franklin raising an abandoned baby, which premiered at BAMcinemaFest 2015.

Kline spent six years continually writing, directing and editing his debut feature Funny Pages, a black comedy about a young dropout cartoonist striking out on his own in Trenton, New Jersey. Produced by the Safdie Brothers and distributed by A24, it premiered in the Director's Fortnight at the 75th Cannes Film Festival in 2022.

In 2021, Kline contributed a two-page comic about Our Gang star Norman "Chubby" Chaney to film critic Nick Pinkerton's premiere issue of Bombast: A Journal of Film & Funnies. In 2025, The Metrograph published The Day The Clown Cried: The Unauthorized Disaster, drawn by Kline and co-written by Stephen Kroninger, surrounding the facts and myths of the unfinished film by Jerry Lewis.

== Filmography ==
Short film

Year	Title	Director	Writer	Editor
2010	Sinners of Kings Highway	Yes	Yes	Yes
2013	Fowl Play	Yes	Yes	Yes
2014	Jazzy for Joe	Yes	Yes	Yes

Documentary film

Year	Title	Director	Writer	Editor
2012	Dave Buddin Drinks at Home	Yes	Yes	Yes
2016	Steve Dalanchinsky	Yes	Yes	Yes

Feature film

Year	Title	Director	Writer	Editor
2022	Funny Pages	Yes	Yes	Yes

Acting roles

Year	Title	Role	Notes
2001	The Anniversary Party	Jack Gold	
2005	The Squid and the Whale	Frank Berkman	
2018	Jobe'z World	Zane	
2024	A Different Man	Nick	
2025	The Studio	Himself	Episode "The War"
