= Kim's Video (film) =

2023 documentary film

- Film poster
- Directed by: David Redmon; Ashley Sabin
- Written by: David Redmon; Ashley Sabin
- Produced by: Francesco Galavotti; David Redmon; Ashley Sabin; Dale Smith; Deborah Smith; Rebecca Tabasky
- Cinematography: David Redmon
- Edited by: Mark Becker; David Redmon; Ashley Sabin
- Music by: Matthew Dougherty; Enrico Tilotta
- Production companies: Carnivalesque Films; Fremantle Documentaries
- Distributed by: Drafthouse Films
- Release date: January 19, 2023 (Sundance)
- Running time: 88 minutes
- Languages: English; Italian; Korean

Kim's Video is a 2023 documentary film about Kim's Video and Music. It is written, produced, edited, and directed by David Redmon and Ashley Sabin.

== Synopsis ==
The film outlines the store's history, most notably its reacquisition and restoration to New York City after the trip to Salemi, Italy, featuring clips from both mainstream and rarely-seen films that are part of Kim's collection of videos and DVDs, alongside archival footage and interviews with former employees like Alex Ross Perry.

== Reception ==
On the review aggregator website Rotten Tomatoes, 71% of 63 critics' reviews are positive. The website's consensus reads: "Kim's Video represents something of a missed opportunity, but this incredible story is gripping enough to overcome an uneven telling." Metacritic, which uses a weighted average, assigned the film a score of 59 out of 100, based on 12 critics, indicating "mixed or average" reviews.

== See also ==
- Cinephilia
- 2023 in film
