= Sean Price Williams =

American cinematographer

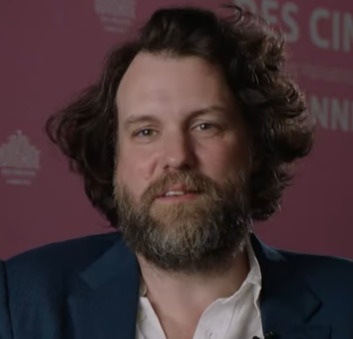
- Williams in 2023
- Born: Wilmington, Delaware, U.S.
- Occupations: Cinematographer film director
- Years active: 2007–present

Sean Price Williams is an American cinematographer and film director. Williams is known for his work as a cinematographer, frequently collaborating with Alex Ross Perry and the Safdie Brothers. He made his directorial feature film debut with The Sweet East (2023).

== Early life ==
He was born in Wilmington, Delaware and lives in New York City.

== Career ==
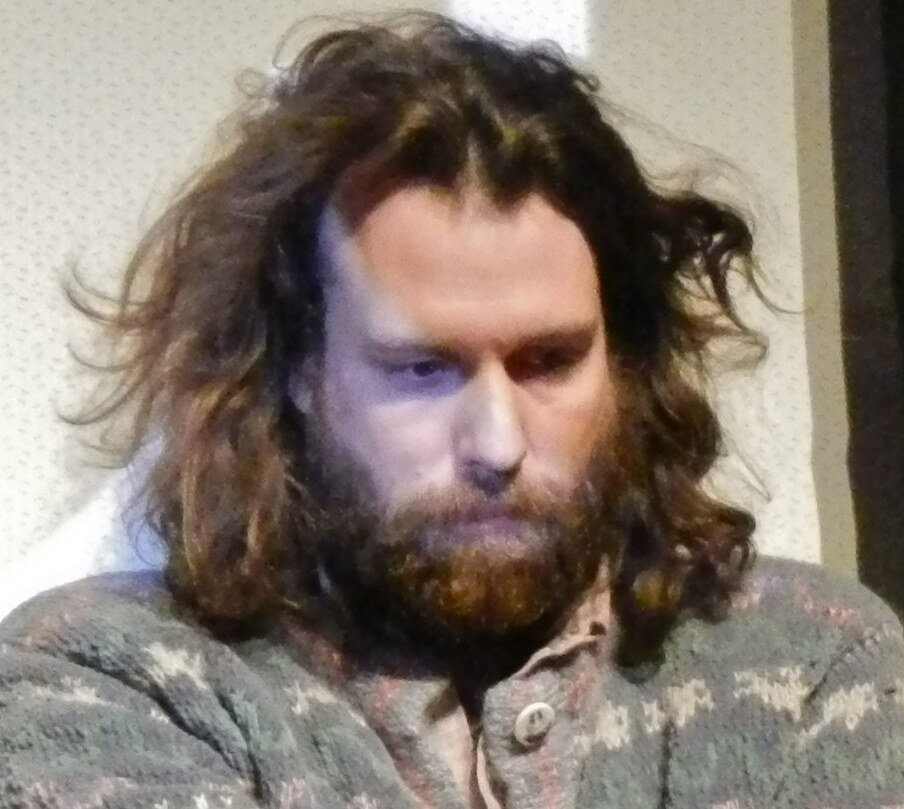
Williams in 2014

Williams is known for his textured, fluid camerawork (often handheld) and a heightened attention to available light. The New Yorker film critic Richard Brody described Williams (in a memorial appraisal of documentary filmmaker Albert Maysles, for whom Williams served extensively as cameraman) as "the cinematographer for many of the best and most significant independent films of the past decade, fiction and documentary." Among the films Williams has shot are Frownland, Yeast, Fake It So Real, The Color Wheel, Young Bodies Heal Quickly, Listen Up Philip, Heaven Knows What, and Queen of Earth.

In a 2013 article for Film.com, critic Calum Marsh deemed Williams "micro-budget filmmaking's most exciting cinematographer." Marsh would go on to write in a 2014 article in Toronto's National Post that "Williams, in particular, has proven indispensable to the [2010s American independent film] movement, and over the past several years has distinguished dozens of the films with his all but peerless talent for photography, from experimental nonfiction work like Maiko Endo's Kuichisan to more conventional comedies like Bob Byington's Somebody Up There Likes Me."

Along with other figures of the New York independent film scene such as Perry, Kate Lyn Sheil, Robert Greene, Luke Oleksa, and Michael M. Bilandic, Williams was a long-time employee of famed New York video and music store Kim's Video and Music.

In 2020, Williams began preparing for his feature directorial debut, The Sweet East. Written by film critic Nick Pinkerton, it stars Talia Ryder as a runaway high school student who weaves her way through a series of American countercultural groups, extremists, and outsiders. It features Simon Rex, Jacob Elordi, Jeremy O. Harris, and Ayo Edebiri. The Match Factory acquired The Sweet East for sales before its premiere in the Directors' Fortnight section at the 2023 Cannes Film Festival. The film garnered positive reviews.

== Filmography ==
=== Feature films ===
- Frownland (2007)
- Yeast (2008)
- Impolex (2009)
- Beetle Queen Conquers Tokyo (2009)
- Mulberry Street (2010)
- The Color Wheel (2011)
- Kuichisan (2012)
- Somebody Up There Likes Me (2012)
- The Black Balloon (2012)
- If You Take This (2014)
- The Vanquishing of the Witch Baba Yaga (2014)
- Listen Up Philip (2014)
- Iris (2014)
- Young Bodies Heal Quickly (2014)
- Heaven Knows What (2014)
- Queen of Earth (2015)
- Christmas, Again (2015)
- Sin Alas (2015)
- Kate Plays Christine (2016)
- Good Time (2017)
- Thirst Street (2017)
- Golden Exits (2017)
- Marjorie Prime (2017)
- Wobble Palace (2018)
- Jobe'z World (2018)
- The Great Pretender (2018)
- Her Smell (2018)
- One Man Dies a Million Times (2019)
- Tesla (2020)
- Ainu Mosir (2020)
- The Birthday Cake (2021)
- Zeros and Ones (2021)
- Funny Pages (2022) (with Hunter Zimny)
- The Sweet East (2023) (directorial debut)
- What Doesn't Float (2023) (with Hunter Zimny)
- Between the Temples (2024)
- Harvest (2024)
- Schneewittchen (2025)
- The Moment (2026)
- The Basics of Philosophy (2026)

=== Documentary films ===
- Turn in the Wound (2024)

=== Music videos ===
- "I Can Only Stare" by Sleigh Bells (2016)
- "Take Me" by Aly & AJ (2017)
- "The Pure and the Damned" by Oneohtrix Point Never (2017)
- "Disco Tits" by Tove Lo (2017)
- "Rare" by Nas (2021)
- "Justine Go Genesis" by Sleigh Bells (2021)
- "D.M.B." by ASAP Rocky (2022)
- "Basement" by Brockhampton (2022)
- The Film by Boygenius (2023) (short film)
- "Please Please Please" by Sabrina Carpenter (2024)
- "Diet Pepsi" by Addison Rae (2024) (also director)
- "Aquamarine" by Addison Rae (2024) (also director)
- "Toxic Till the End" by Rosé (2024)
- "Terrapin" by Clairo (2024)
- "Fame Is a Gun" by Addison Rae (2025)
