= Beetle Queen Conquers Tokyo =

- Film poster
- Directed by: Jessica Oreck
- Produced by: Jessica Oreck, Akito Y. Kawahara, Maiko Endo
- Cinematography: Sean Price Williams
- Release date: March 14, 2009 (South by Southwest)
- Running time: 90 minutes
- Country: United States

Beetle Queen Conquers Tokyo is a 2009 documentary directed by American filmmaker Jessica Oreck. The documentary shows how insects are entwined with Japan from past to present. A Japanese narrator reads poetry and legends, and gives information about the insects. The film has shots of insects interspersed with shots of daily life in Japan. It has to do with how the Japanese treat insects of all types.

The film screened within the 2009 South by Southwest Film Conference & Festival and the 2009 Maryland Film Festival. It was nominated for the Truer Than Fiction Award at the 25th Independent Spirit Awards.
