= Queen of Earth =

2015 film by Alex Ross Perry

- Theatrical release poster
- Directed by: Alex Ross Perry
- Written by: Alex Ross Perry
- Produced by: Elisabeth Moss; Alex Ross Perry; Adam Piotrowicz; Joe Swanberg
- Starring: Elisabeth Moss; Katherine Waterston; Patrick Fugit; Kentucker Audley
- Cinematography: Sean Price Williams
- Edited by: Robert Greene; Peter Levin
- Music by: Keegan DeWitt
- Production company: Washington Square Films
- Distributed by: IFC Films
- Release dates: February 7, 2015 (Berlin International Film Festival); August 26, 2015 (United States)
- Running time: 90 minutes
- Country: United States
- Language: English
- Box office: $91,218

Queen of Earth is a 2015 American psychological thriller film written, co-produced and directed by Alex Ross Perry. The film stars Elisabeth Moss, Katherine Waterston and Patrick Fugit.

== Plot ==
Catherine is in the midst of a breakup with her boyfriend, James, who is leaving her for another woman. Catherine's father, a renowned artist, has recently died by suicide after a history of depression. Knowing of Catherine's grief, her lifelong friend Virginia invites her to spend a week at her parents' cabin. The visit is intercut with scenes of Catherine's stay the previous year, when Virginia had been the one needing emotional support, and was disappointed when Catherine brought along James, whom Virginia hated, and drew focus away from their friendship.

Catherine is upset when Virginia invites Rich, a neighbor, to join them at the cabin. Virginia criticizes Catherine for having had unhealthy and codependent relationships with James and her father, and for choosing to live as her father's administrative support instead of attempting her own artistic career. Catherine derides Virginia for her aimless, unemployed lifestyle. Despite their arguments, Virginia assures Catherine that she truly cares about her and wants to see her heal. Catherine begins drawing a portrait of Virginia as the two spend their evenings discussing their personal relationships.

Catherine's mental health gradually deteriorates during her stay. She has a strange encounter with a neighbor who warns her that Virginia's parents are bad people; she has difficulty sleeping and eating, and is increasingly paranoid over Rich's presence, believing he is driving a wedge between her and Virginia. As Virginia becomes concerned over Catherine's well-being, Catherine worries that they think she is crazy. After Catherine has a disturbed reaction to Rich's observation that she had been talking to herself the night before, Virginia remarks that she is finally seeing Catherine for the first time: she had initially thought Catherine was perfect, but now realizes that she surrounded herself with men to protect her weak and fragile sense of self. Catherine muses that she feels she no longer exists, and that the only two people who cared about her are gone. Virginia insists that she also cares about Catherine, which Catherine casually denies.

After Virginia and Rich take Catherine out on a canoe ride, Virginia listens in as Catherine describes the event to someone on the phone, which is disconnected. She assumes Catherine is speaking with James, but it is left ambiguous as to whether an unstable Catherine is envisioning herself conversing with her late father. That night, Virginia throws a party for some neighbors, and Catherine imagines increasingly hostile interactions with the guests, including a confrontation over her father's embezzlement, ending with her screaming as all of the guests grab at her. After coming to her senses, she flees. She begins to lose awareness of time and her surroundings, and after a dinner where Rich mocks her mental struggles and callously suggests she use her recent grief to promote a new art career, she calmly and witheringly insults him, blaming him for being an embodiment of all the worst things in the world.

The next morning, Catherine confronts Rich and blames him for getting in the way of what should have been her week with Virginia, but he remains unsympathetic, saying he hates her because he considers her a spoiled brat. Catherine ineffectually attempts to strangle him, then suffers a nervous breakdown, leading a stunned Virginia to realize that Catherine's issues are greater than her own the previous year, and she is far beyond her help. As Catherine leaves the cabin to return home, Virginia remembers the previous year when Catherine had apologized to her for not being a better friend, and they jokingly promise that next year, Catherine can be the one needing help and Virginia can disappoint her. A guilt-ridden Virginia later discovers Catherine's finished portrait, leading her to break down in sobs as Catherine laughs maniacally elsewhere.

== Cast ==
- Elisabeth Moss as Catherine Hewitt
- Katherine Waterston as Virginia 'Ginny' Lowell
- Patrick Fugit as Rich
- Kentucker Audley as James
- Keith Poulson as Keith
- Kate Lyn Sheil as Michelle

== Production ==
On July 30, 2014, it was announced that Alex Ross Perry would direct the psychological thriller film which he wrote about two women at a beach house, in which Elisabeth Moss would star as lead, while Joe Swanberg would be producer. On August 21, Michelle Dockery joined the film to star as lead opposite Moss. On September 17, Katherine Waterston was added to the cast to replace Dockery for her role, which Dockery exited due to scheduling conflicts. On September 18, Patrick Fugit was cast to play a friend of one of the women in the film, who also comes to the beach to spend time with her. Perry would also produce the film along with Swanberg and Adam Piotrowicz.

=== Filming ===
Filming was underway in Carmel, New York on September 17, 2014.

=== Music ===
The score was composed by Keegan DeWitt and was released by Waxwork Records on vinyl in 2018. The LP included liner notes by Moss, Perry, and DeWitt.

== Release ==
The film had its world premiere at the Berlin International Film Festival on February 7, 2015. Shortly after, it was announced IFC Films had acquired distribution rights to the film. The film was released on August 26, 2015, in a limited release and through video on demand.

== Reception ==
As of June 2020, the film holds a 93% approval rating on Rotten Tomatoes, based on 81 reviews with an average rating of 7.49/10. The website's critical consensus reads: "Led by a searing performance from Elisabeth Moss, Queen of Earth is a demanding – and ultimately rewarding – addition to writer-director Alex Ross Perry's impressive filmography." On Metacritic, the film has a score of 77 out of 100, based on 23 critics, indicating "generally positive reviews".
