= Aatsinki: The Story of Arctic Cowboys =

2013 documentary film by Jessica Oreck

- Directed by: Jessica Oreck
- Written by: Jessica Oreck
- Produced by: Jessica Oreck
- Cinematography: Jessica Oreck
- Edited by: Jessica Oreck
- Production company: Myriapod Productions
- Release date: 2013
- Running time: 84 minutes
- Countries: United States; Finland
- Language: Finnish

Aatsinki: The Story of Arctic Cowboys is a 2013 documentary about Finnish reindeer herders, brothers Aarne and Lasse Aatsinki, by Jessica Oreck.

There is an online interactive counterpart of the documentary, The Aatsinki Season.

== History ==
Jessica Oreck originally planned to make a film in Siberia, but her father, Bruce J. Oreck, was appointed ambassador to Finland, therefore she decided to film her documentary there.
