= Alex Ross Perry =

American filmmaker and actor

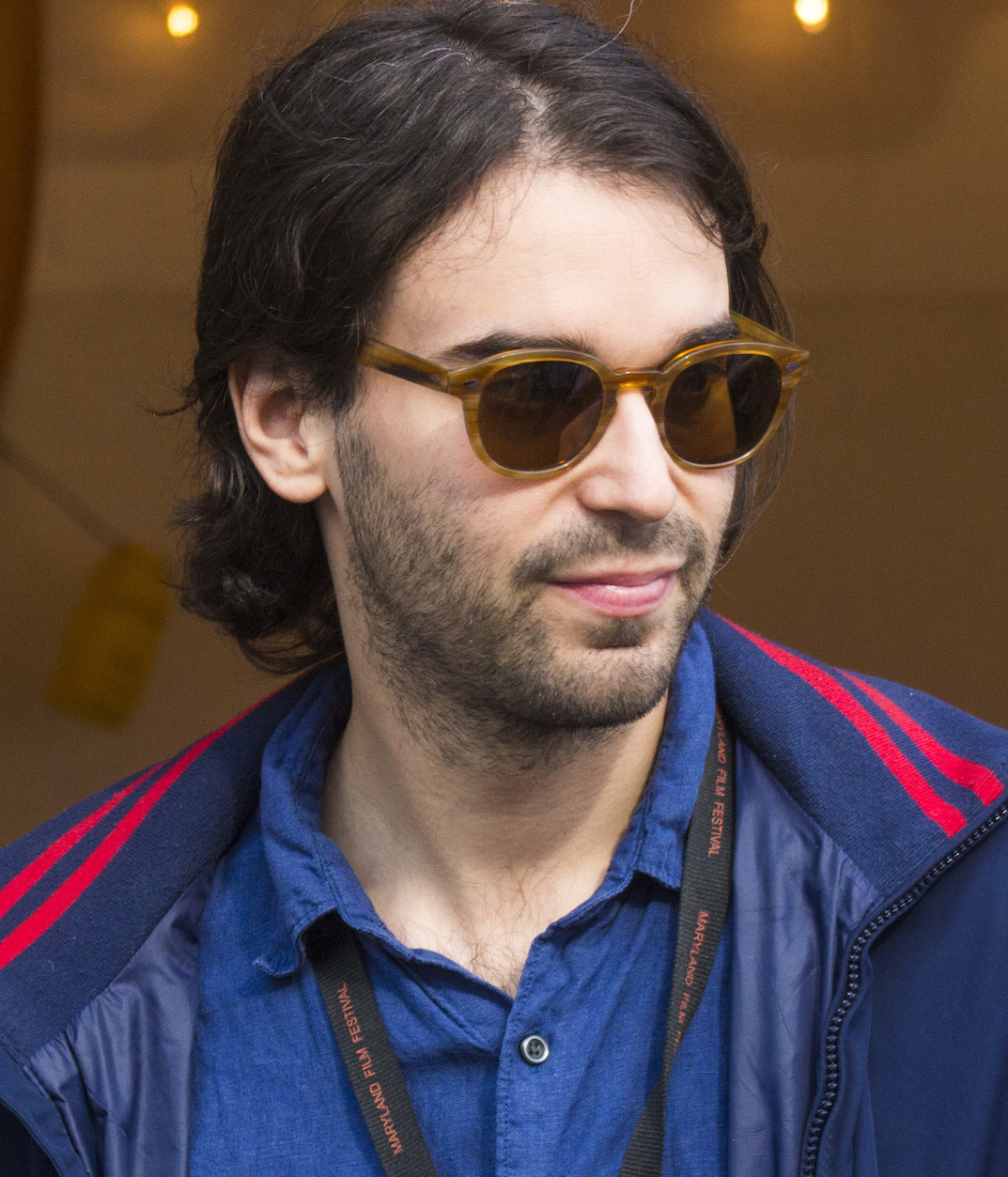
- Perry in 2014
- Born: July 14, 1984 (age 42); Bryn Mawr, Pennsylvania
- Education: New York University
- Occupations: Film director; screenwriter; film producer; actor; film editor
- Years active: 2009–present
- Spouse: Anna Bak-Kvapil (m. 2016)
- Children: 1

Perry discussing film and his The Color Wheel in 2011

Alex Ross Perry (born July 14, 1984) is an American filmmaker and actor. Prolific in independent film, he is best known for writing and directing Listen Up Philip (2014) and Her Smell (2018).

== Early life ==
Perry grew up in Bryn Mawr, Pennsylvania, where he worked on a local television news program during high school. After graduating, he moved to New York City to attend NYU. He graduated from NYU's film program in 2006. From 2005 to 2007, Perry worked at the East Village-based video store Kim's Video, where he met many of the cast and crew members who later worked on his films, including director of photography Sean Price Williams. He was influenced by Philip Roth, Vincent Gallo, Jerry Lewis, and Thomas Pynchon.

== Career ==
Perry's first feature, Impolex, premiered in 2009. Made on a budget of $15,000 and shot on 16mm film stock, the film is an absurdist comedy inspired by Thomas Pynchon's novel Gravity's Rainbow. It was released theatrically in 2011.

Perry's second feature, The Color Wheel, premiered at festivals in 2011. The film, a dark screwball comedy influenced by the work of Philip Roth, was co-written by Perry and Carlen Altman; the two also play the lead roles in the film. It was named the best undistributed film of 2011 by the Indiewire and Village Voice polls, and placed 12th in a similar poll conducted by Film Comment. It was released theatrically on May 18, 2012.

Perry's next film, the comedy Listen Up Philip, premiered at the Sundance Film Festival in 2014.

Perry's fourth film, Queen of Earth, stars Elisabeth Moss, Katherine Waterston, Patrick Fugit, Kentucker Audley, and Kate Lyn Sheil. It had its world premiere at the Berlin Film Festival on February 7, 2015, and was released in a limited release and through video on demand on August 26, 2015. In April 2015, Disney hired Perry to write a live-action adaptation of the Winnie the Pooh franchise, with the resulting Christopher Robin released to theaters in August 2018. He also optioned Don DeLillo's The Names for a feature adaptation.

In 2017 he directed the music video for Aly & AJ's single "Take Me", and in 2019, also directed the music video for the single Church for the same band.

His films Golden Exits and Her Smell were released in 2018 and 2019, respectively.

In 2022, he directed the music video for Pavement's single "Harness Your Hopes", "Bones" for Soccer Mommy and the long form mockumentary "Metal Myths: Ghost Pt. 2" for Ghost.

In 2024, Perry's documentary-fiction hybrid film about Pavement, Pavements, a continuation of his collaboration with the band, premiered. The film incorporates concert footage from an original jukebox musical Perry staged, Slanted! Enchanted! A Pavement Musical, featuring Zoe Lister-Jones, Michael Esper, and Kathryn Gallagher.

On 23 July 2025, Variety revealed that Perry was among the filmmakers who directed a segment for V/H/S/Halloween, Shudder's 8th installment in their horror anthology V/H/S franchise. The film was released in October 2025.

== Personal life ==
In 2016, after nine years of dating, Perry married visual artist Anna Bak-Kvapil. They have two children. Perry is a vegan.

== Filmography ==
Year	Title	Director	Writer	Producer	Editor	Notes
2009	Impolex	Yes	Yes	Yes	Yes	
2011	The Color Wheel	Yes	Yes	Yes	Yes	
2013	The Sixth Year	Yes	Yes		Yes	Segment director: "Episode 5"; Additional screenplay material
2014	Listen Up Philip	Yes	Yes			
2015	Queen of Earth	Yes	Yes	Yes		
2017	Golden Exits	Yes	Yes	Yes		
2018	Nostalgia		Yes	Yes		
2018	Christopher Robin		Yes			
2018	Her Smell	Yes	Yes	Yes		
2020	Paul Schrader: Man in a Room	Yes		Yes		Documentary short
2023	The Sweet East			Yes		
2024	Rite Here Rite Now	Yes				Concert film; co-directed with Tobias Forge
2024	Pavements	Yes	Yes			
2025	Videoheaven	Yes	Yes			Documentary film
2025	V/H/S/Halloween	Yes	Yes			Segment: "Kidprint"

Acting credits

Year	Title	Role
2010	Tiny Furniture	Ashlynn's Friend
2011	The Color Wheel	Colin
2011	Happy Life	Donald
2011	Green	Phillip Roth expert
2012	Somebody Up There Likes Me	Pizza Customer #1
2015	7 Chinese Brothers	Hats at Cars
2015	Devil Town	Detective Ira Goldberg
2016	Joshy	Adam
2024	An Almost Christmas Story	Dave the Dog (voice)

Music videos

Year	Title	Artist(s)
2016	"I Can Only Stare"	Sleigh Bells
2017	"Take Me"	Aly & AJ
2019	"Church"	Aly & AJ
2019	"Don't Go Changing"	Aly & AJ
2019	"Good Woman"	Anika Pyle
2019	"Sludge"	Vivian Girls
2019	"Yellow is the Color of Her Eyes"	Soccer Mommy
2021	"Justine Go Genesis"	Sleigh Bells
2022	"In the Eyes of Our Love"	Yumi Zouma
2022	"Where the Light Used to Lay"	Yumi Zouma
2022	"Astral Projection"	Yumi Zouma
2022	"Harness Your Hopes"	Pavement
2022	"Metal Myths"	Ghost
2022	"Bones"	Soccer Mommy
2023	"Days Move Slow"	Bully
2023	"Jesus He Knows Me"	Ghost
2023	"Tidal Session"	Momma
2023	"The Flood"	Zilched
2023	"Ghostwriter"	Speedy Ortiz
2024	"Stopping and Staring"	Gustaf
2024	"Missing Out"	Maya Hawke
2024	"Dark"	Maya Hawke
2024	"I'm A Man"	Kim Gordon
2025	"Bunky Pop"	Sleigh Bells
2025	"Stay in Your Lane"	Courtney Barnett
