= Institute of Plant Industry =

Research institute in Saint Petersburg, Russia

Coordinates: 59.9319°N 30.3086°E

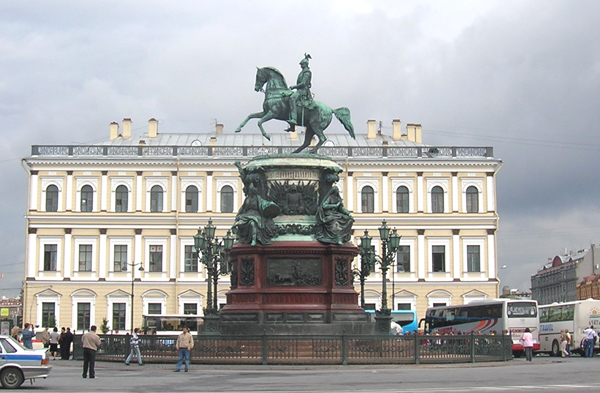
Behind the equestrian statue of Nikolai I near St Isaac's Cathedral is No. 4 Building of the Institute of Plant Industry

The Institute of Plant Industry, Vavilov Institute of Plant Industry or N. I. Vavilov All-Russian Institute of Plant Genetic Resources (VIR) (in Russian: Всероссийский институт генетических ресурсов растений имени Н.И. Вавилова (ВИР)), as it is officially called since 2015, is a research institute of plant genetics and seed bank, located in Saint Petersburg, Russia.

== History ==
The Institute of Plant Industry was established in 1921 in Leningrad by Nikolai Vavilov who set about to create the world's first and largest collection of plant seeds. Already in 1916 he did his first collection trip abroad, to Iran, and by 1932 he had collected seeds from almost every country in the world, which by 1933 had made the institute the largest seed bank in the world, with more than 148,000 specimens.

However, Trofim Lysenko was eventually hired by the institute. He was a strong proponent of Lamarckism (the theory that changes to an organism's body during its life would be inherited) and rejected Mendelian hereditary genetics. This fitted Josef Stalin's world view, as it was seen as a marxist rejection of heritage in favour of environment, but Vavilov objected to it. Consequently, Vavilov became the target of the Lysenkoist debate. While collecting seeds in Ukraine in August 1940, he was arrested and accused of spying and ruining Soviet agriculture. After Vavilov’s arrest, the responsibilities for running the institute were assumed by Nikolai Ivanov.

During the 28-month siege of Leningrad in World War II, a limited evacuation of some institute staff and a small number of seeds failed when the Germans closed the last rail line going out of Leningrad. The institute's extensive seed collection (consisting of some 120 tonnes of seeds, nuts and roots, including 6,000 varieties of potato) survived, thanks to the 50 botanists who worked there. They protected the seeds from German fire bombs, extreme cold, rodents, and their own hunger - as they would rather starve to death than eat the collection. At least 19 of them died, mostly from starvation.

The story of the institute during the siege of Leningrad was dramatized in Jessica Oreck's 2019 feature film One Man Dies a Million Times.

In 2010 the plant collection at the Pavlovsk Experimental Station was to be destroyed to make way for luxury housing. This was averted by order of President Dmitry Medvedev.

== Collections ==
The institute's seed collection is the only one in the Russian Federation and is one of the top five leading gene banks in the world. Its wheat collection is one of the five leading in the world in terms of genetic diversity, along with Mexico, the USA, Italy and Australia. The barley collection is the fourth in the world in terms of the number of samples (after Great Britain, Canada and the USA). The oat collection is third in the world, as are the cotton and peanut collections. The sunflower collection is second in the world. The rye, buckwheat and flax collections are the largest in the world, and the hemp collection is the only one. The corn and potato collections preserve unique crops from the first half of the 20th century that are not found in other collections.

== See also ==
- VASKhNIL (the All-Union Academy of Agricultural Sciences of the Soviet Union)
