= Katherine Waterston =

British-born American actress (born 1980)

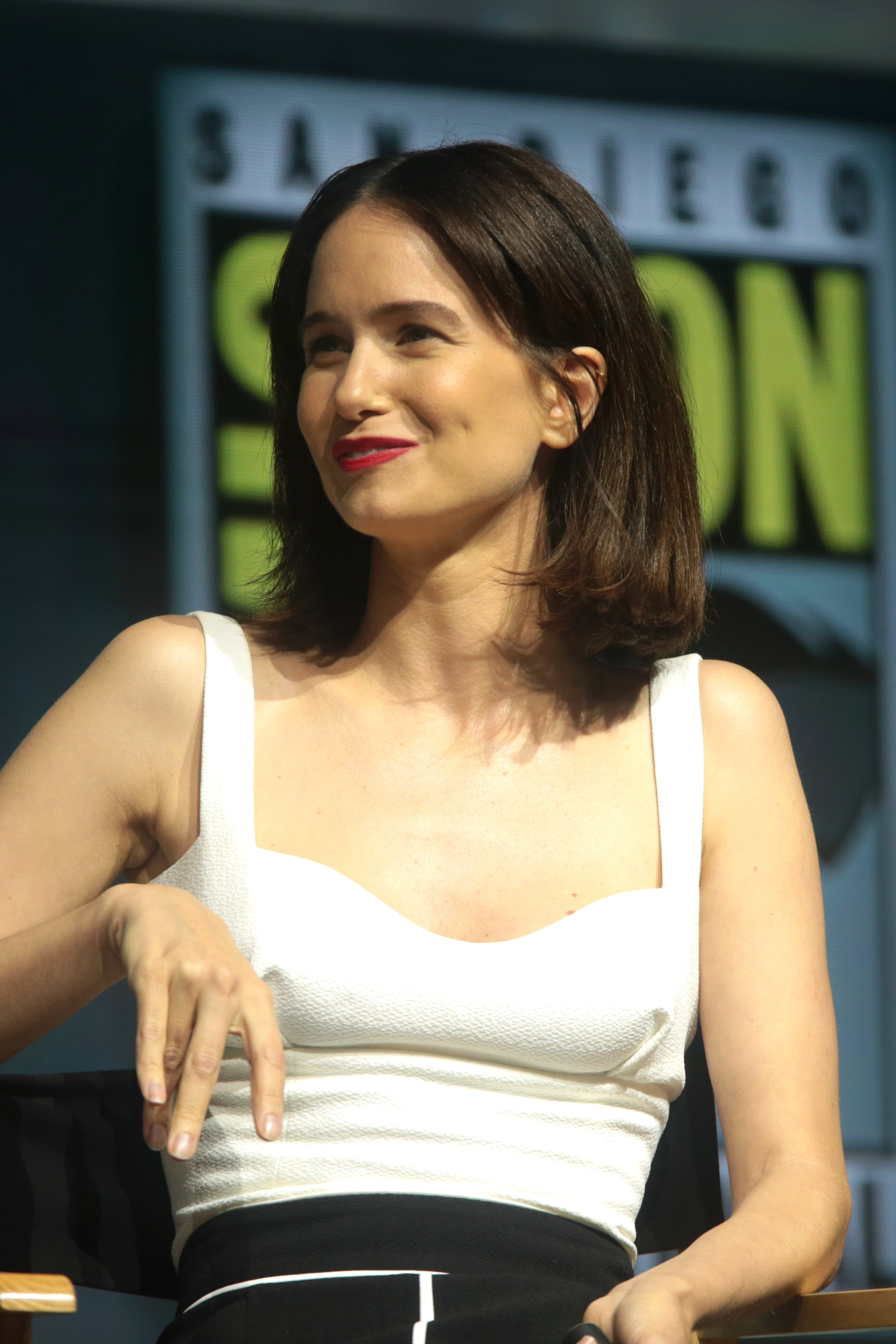
- Waterston at the 2018 San Diego Comic Con
- Born: Katherine Boyer Waterston; 3 March 1980 (age 46); London, England
- Citizenship: United Kingdom; United States
- Education: New York University
- Occupation: Actress
- Years active: 2003–present
- Children: 1
- Father: Sam Waterston
- Relatives: James Waterston (paternal half-brother)

Katherine Boyer Waterston (born 3 March 1980) is a British-born American actress. She made her feature film debut in Michael Clayton (2007). She had supporting roles in films including Robot & Frank, Being Flynn (both 2012) and The Disappearance of Eleanor Rigby (2013), before her breakthrough performance in Inherent Vice (2014). She portrayed Chrisann Brennan in Steve Jobs (2015), and went on to star as Tina Goldstein in Fantastic Beasts and Where to Find Them (2016) and its sequels. Her other film roles include Alien: Covenant (2017), Logan Lucky (2017), The Current War (2017), Mid90s (2018), Amundsen (2019), The World to Come (2020), Fantastic Beasts: The Secrets of Dumbledore (2022), Babylon (2022), The End We Start From (2023), Fackham Hall (2025), and The Uprising (2026).

== Early life ==
Katherine Waterston was born in Westminster, London, the daughter of American parents, Lynn Louisa (née Woodruff), a former model, and Sam Waterston, an actor. She is a middle child, with a sister who is an actor, and a brother who is a director. She also has an older paternal half-brother, actor James Waterston.

Raised in Connecticut, Waterston graduated from the Loomis Chaffee School, Windsor, Connecticut, in 1998. She is a graduate of New York University's Tisch School of the Arts.

== Career ==
Waterston's first starring role on film was in the 2007 independent drama The Babysitters, alongside John Leguizamo and Cynthia Nixon. Also in 2007, Waterston performed in the play Los Angeles by Julian Sheppard. The following year, she acted in Kindness, a play by Adam Rapp. In 2010, Waterston played Gena in the original Off-Broadway production of Leslye Headland's Bachelorette, the role played by Lizzy Caplan in the 2011 film version. In 2011, she played Anya in the Classic Stage Company revival of The Cherry Orchard. Also in 2011, she performed in Rapp's Dreams of Flying, Dreams of Falling at the Classic Stage Company.

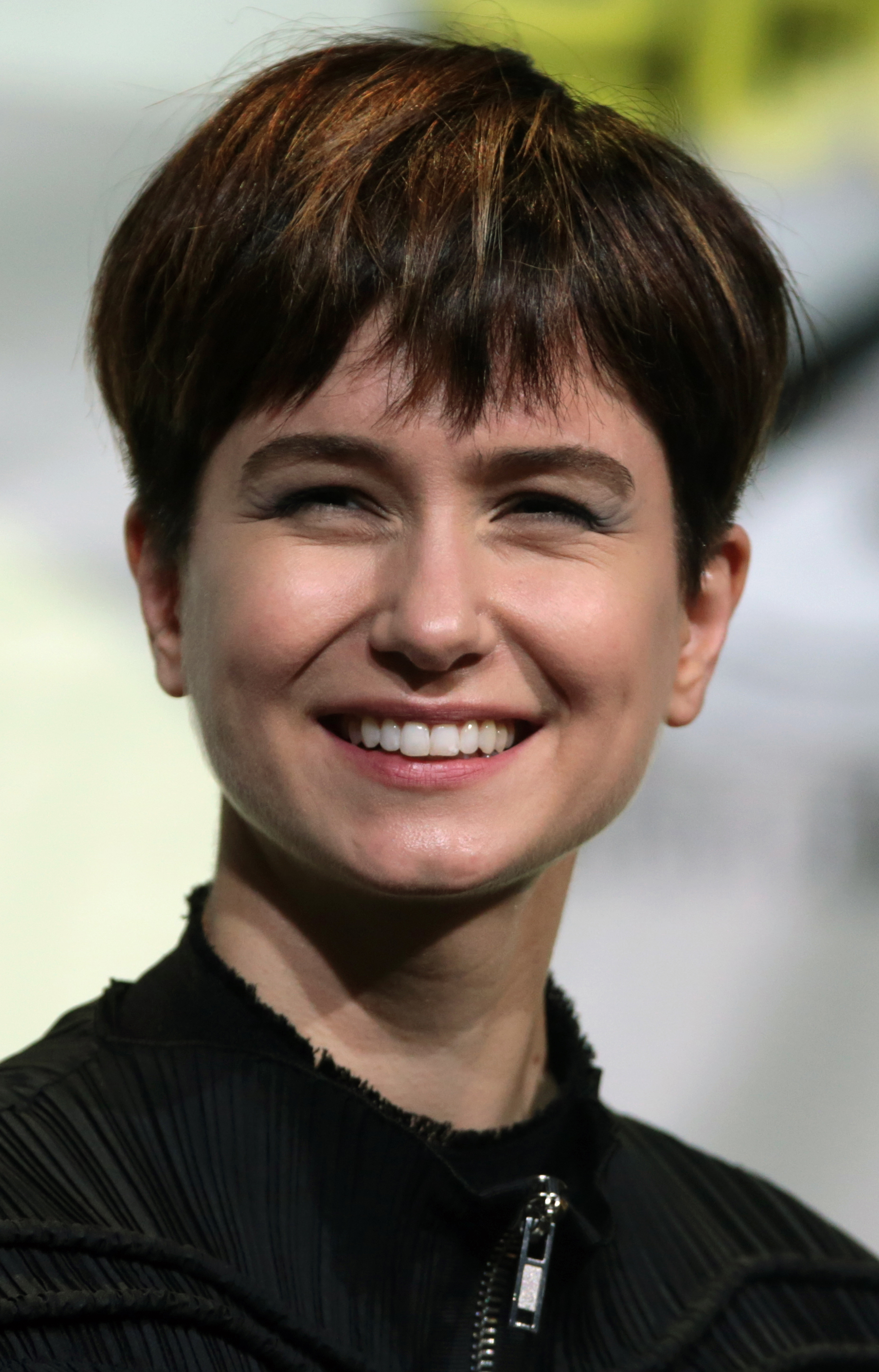
Waterston at the 2016 San Diego Comic-Con

After supporting roles in films including Enter Nowhere (2011), Being Flynn (2012), The Letter (2012) and The Disappearance of Eleanor Rigby (2013), Waterston was cast in the 2014 crime film Inherent Vice, written and directed by Paul Thomas Anderson. The film and her performance received generally positive reviews from critics. The following year, she appeared in Queen of Earth and played Chrisann Brennan in director Danny Boyle's biographical drama Steve Jobs, starring Michael Fassbender.

In 2016, Waterston was cast as Tina Goldstein in the fantasy film Fantastic Beasts and Where to Find Them opposite Eddie Redmayne. The film received generally positive reviews from critics and became a commercial success, grossing $814 million worldwide. Waterston reprised her role in Fantastic Beasts: The Crimes of Grindelwald in 2018, and had a short part in Fantastic Beasts: The Secrets of Dumbledore (2022). In 2017, she starred alongside Fassbender for director Ridley Scott in the science fiction horror film Alien: Covenant. That year she also starred in Steven Soderbergh's heist comedy-drama Logan Lucky, and Alfonso Gomez-Rejon's historical drama The Current War.

Waterston's next starring roles were in the independent films State Like Sleep (2018), Mid90s (2018), Amundsen (2019), and The World to Come (2020). In 2020, she starred in the British-American horror drama series The Third Day alongside Jude Law. In 2022, she joined the cast of the second season of HBO period drama series Perry Mason.

In 2023, Waterson starred in British film The End We Start From, for which she was nominated for Best Supporting Performance at the British Independent Film Awards. In 2023 she also starred in the film Asphalt City, and as an MI5 agent in the British spy thriller television series Slow Horses.

In 2024, Waterson starred as a series regular in the Paramount+ spy thriller series The Agency, based on the French drama Le Bureau des Légendes (2015-2020) and in the film Afraid by Chris Weitz. In 2025, she featured in slasher film Fear Street: Prom Queen and in the British period satirical comedy film Fackham Hall.

== Personal life ==
As of 2017, by her description during an interview, Waterston held dual citizenship, British and American.

For a number of years she was in a relationship with American playwright Adam Rapp. His 2011 three-play collection The Hallway Trilogy is dedicated to her; she appeared as Rose Hathaway in Part 1: Rose in its premiere at the Rattlestick Playwrights Theater.

In 2018, Waterston moved to London and revealed that she was expecting her first child, whom she gave birth to in 2019. She has not made public who the father of her son is.

Waterston is a supporter of transgender rights. She has cited her participation in the Fantastic Beasts franchise as a reason for her being so vocal, and has publicly denounced statements by series creator J. K. Rowling which she considered insensitive to transgender people.

== Filmography ==
Key
†	Denotes titles that have not yet been released

=== Film ===
Year	Title	Role	Notes
2007	Michael Clayton	Third Year	
2007	The Babysitters	Shirley Lyner	
2008	Good Dick	Katherine	
2009	Taking Woodstock	Penny	
2011	Enter Nowhere	Samantha	
2012	Robot & Frank	Shopgirl	
2012	Being Flynn	Sarah	
2012	The Letter	Julie	
2012	The Factory	Lauren	
2013	Night Moves	Anne	
2013	The Disappearance of Eleanor Rigby: Her	Charlie	
2014	Inherent Vice	Shasta Fay Hepworth	
2014	Glass Chin	Patricia Petals O'Neal	
2015	Sleeping with Other People	Emma	
2015	Queen of Earth	Virginia	
2015	Steve Jobs	Chrisann Brennan	
2015	Manhattan Romance	Carla	
2016	Fantastic Beasts and Where to Find Them	Tina Goldstein	
2017	Alien: Covenant	Janet "Danny" Daniels	
2017	Logan Lucky	Sylvia Harrison	
2017	The Current War	Marguerite Westinghouse	
2018	State Like Sleep	Katherine Grand	
2018	Mid90s	Dabney	
2018	Fantastic Beasts: The Crimes of Grindelwald	Tina Goldstein	
2019	Amundsen	Bess Magids	
2020	The World to Come	Abigail	
2022	Fantastic Beasts: The Secrets of Dumbledore	Tina Goldstein	Cameo appearance
2022	Babylon	Estelle Conrad	
2023	Asphalt City	Nancy	
2023	The End We Start From	O	
2024	Afraid	Meredith Pike	
2025	Fear Street: Prom Queen	Nancy Falconer	
2025	Fackham Hall	Lady Davenport	
2026	The Uprising †	Countess	

=== Television ===
Year	Title	Role	Notes
2012–2013	Boardwalk Empire	Emma Harrow	5 episodes
2020	The Third Day	Jess	Miniseries, 5 episodes
2023	Perry Mason	Virginia "Ginny" Szymanski Aimes	Main role (season 2), 6 episodes
2023	Slow Horses	Alison Dunn	Recurring (season 3)
2024	The Franchise	Quinn Walker	Episode: "Scene 54: The Lilac Ghost"
2024–present	The Agency	Naomi Ford	Main role
2027	The Best of Us (TV series)	Amy Smith	Main role

=== Shorts ===
Year	Title	Role	Notes
2006	Orchids	Beatrice	
2011	Eat	Claire	
2012	Ástarsaga	Solange	
2015	Outlaws	The Trapeze Artist	
2022	House Comes with a Bird	Ruth	

=== Video games ===
Year	Title	Voice role
2016	Lego Dimensions	Tina Goldstein (voice)

== Stage ==
Year	Title	Role	Notes
2003	Smashing		The Play Company
2007	Los Angeles	Audrey	The Flea Theater
2008	Kindness	Frances	Playwrights Horizons
2009	Reborning	Kelly	Summer Play Festival
2010	Bachelorette	Gena	McGinn/Cazale Theatre
2011	The Hallway Trilogy (Part 1: Rose)	Rose Hathaway	Rattlestick Playwrights Theater
2011	Dreams of Flying Dreams of Falling	Cora Cabot	Classic Stage Company
2012	The Cherry Orchard	Anya	Classic Stage Company

== Awards and nominations ==
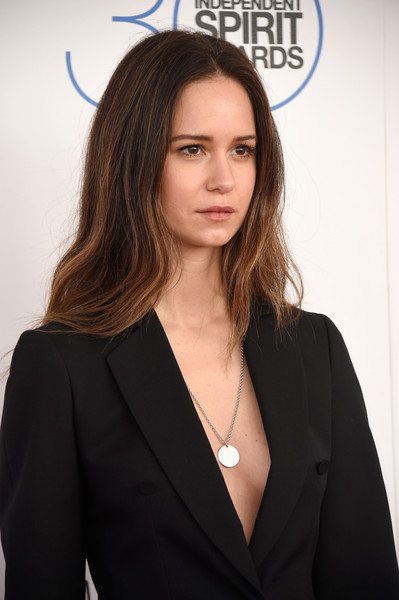
Waterston at the 2015 Independent Spirit Awards

Year	Association	Category	Work	Result	ref.
2014	Satellite Awards	Best Supporting Actress in a Motion Picture	Inherent Vice	Nominated	
2014	Toronto Film Critics Association	Best Supporting Actress	Inherent Vice	Nominated	
2014	Village Voice Film Poll	Best Supporting Actress	Inherent Vice	Nominated	
2014	Indiewire Critics' Poll	Best Supporting Actress	Inherent Vice	Nominated	
2015	Film Independent Spirit Awards	Robert Altman Award	Inherent Vice	Won	
2015	Denver Film Critics Society	Best Supporting Actress	Inherent Vice	Nominated	
2015	Awards Circuit Community Awards	Best Cast Ensemble	Steve Jobs	Nominated	
2016	Gold Derby Awards	Ensemble Cast	Steve Jobs	Nominated	
2016	Chlotrudis Awards	Best Supporting Actress	Queen of Earth	Nominated	
2017	Teen Choice Awards	Choice Fantasy Movie Actress	Fantastic Beasts and Where to Find Them	Nominated	
2019	Teen Choice Awards	Choice Sci-Fi/Fantasy Movie Actress	Fantastic Beasts: The Crimes of Grindelwald	Nominated	
2020	Stockholm International Film Festival	Best Actress	The World to Come	Won	
2023	Screen Actors Guild Awards British Independent Film Awards	Outstanding Performance by a Cast in a Motion Picture Best Supporting Performance	Babylon The End We Start From	Nominated	
