= Michael M. Bilandic =

American filmmaker

- Born: Chicago, U.S.
- Occupation: Director
- Years active: 2004–present

Michael M. Bilandic is an American film director, writer and producer, best known for his gritty New York City based microbudget comedies Hellaware, Jobe'z World and Project Space 13 (2021). He is a frequent collaborator of the director Abel Ferrara and cinematographer Sean Price Williams.

== Early life ==
Michael M. Bilandic was born in 1978, in Chicago, Illinois to Heather Morgan and former mayor of Chicago and chief justice of the Illinois Supreme Court, Michael Anthony Bilandic.

As a young man, Bilandic joined his grandfather on a fishing trip to northern Wisconsin. He viewed his grandfather as a nice man and the "alpha of the family".

Bilandic moved from Chicago to Lower Manhattan just several days before the September 11 attacks in 2001. The neighborhood stayed his place of residence for years and the backdrop for all of his films.

In 2004 Bilandic worked as directing intern for Spike Lee on his film She Hate Me. In 2008, he began working with Abel Ferrara, first as his assistant on the documentary "Chelsea on the Rocks" then moving up to producing his films Mulberry St. in 2010 and The Projectionist in 2019.

== Career ==
Bilandic wrote and directed his first feature film, Happy Life in 2011. The project was executive produced by Abel Ferrara and tells the story of a DJ running a failing record store specializing in techno. The film features stars Tom McCaffrey and features Kate Lyn Sheil and Alex Ross Perry. Happy Life marks the first collaboration with Sean Price Williams, who has acted as cinematographer on all of Bilandic's work.

Hellaware, Bilandic's sophomore feature stars Keith Poulson and Sophia Takal as a New York art world hopeful who stumbles upon a group of teenage horrorcore rappers in rural Delaware and begins to photograph them, which leads to his own success. Several prominent independent filmmakers make cameos throughout the film, including Josh Safdie, Eleonore Hendricks and Robert Greene. The film was picked up by the Brooklyn-based independent film distribution company Factory 25.

Bilandic's next film Jobe'z World and stars Jason Grisell as a rollerblading drug dealer who lives and works by night in Manhattan. The cast also features Theodore Bouloukos and Owen Kline. It film premiered at Manhattan theater Cinema Village.

During the COVID-19 pandemic, Bilandic wrote, directed and released Project Space 13. It functions as a loose sequel to 2013's Hellaware, following the further exploits of Keith Poulson's character. Jobe'z World stars Theodore Bouloukos and Jason Grisell return to round out the cast. It was released in 2021 on Mubi (streaming service).

Bilandic has acted in films for Dasha Nekrasova, Sebastian Sommer and Ricky D'Ambrose.

== Filmography ==
| Year | Title | Director | Writer | Producer | Actor | Notes |
|---|---|---|---|---|---|---|
| 2011 | Mulberry St. | No | No | Yes | No | dir. Abel Ferrara |
| 2011 | Happy Life | Yes | Yes | Yes | No | Debut |
| 2010 | Hellaware | Yes | Yes | No | No | |
| 2018 | Jobe'z World | Yes | Yes | No | No | |
| 2019 | The Projectionist | No | No | Yes | No | dir. Abel Ferrara |
| 2021 | Project Space 13 | Yes | Yes | No | No | Loose sequel to Hellaware |
| 2021 | The Scary of Sixty-First | No | No | No | Yes | dir. Dasha Nekrasova |
