= National Register of Historic Places listings in Pottawattamie County, Iowa =

Location of Pottawattamie County in Iowa

Pottawattamie County, Iowa, United States, has 42 properties and districts listed on the National Register of Historic Places, including two National Historic Landmarks. Three other sites were once listed on the Register but have been removed.

Latitude and longitude coordinates are provided below for many National Register properties and districts; these locations may be seen together in a map.

This National Park Service list is complete through NPS recent listings posted September 4, 2026.

	Name on the Register	Image	Date listed	Location	City or town	Description
1	100 Block of West Broadway Historic District	100 Block of West Broadway Historic District	May 9, 2002 (#02000455)	W. Broadway, 1st St., and 4th St. 41°15′46″N 95°50′42″W	Council Bluffs	
2	Bennett Building	Bennett Building	August 8, 2001 (#01000861)	405 West Broadway; 41°15′38″N 95°50′57″W	Council Bluffs	
3	August Beresheim House	August Beresheim House	August 13, 1976 (#76000802)	621 3rd St. 41°15′16″N 95°50′52″W	Council Bluffs	
4	Jean and Inez Bregant House	Jean and Inez Bregant House	October 16, 2013 (#13000832)	517 S. 4th Street; 41°15′23″N 95°51′01″W	Council Bluffs	
5	Carstens Farmstead	Carstens Farmstead	July 10, 1979 (#79000932)	South of Shelby on Iowa Highway 168; 41°28′57″N 95°27′22″W	Shelby	Original farmhouse, feed shed and granary #18 demolished, windmill moved to new location on farmstead.
6	Thomas E. Cavin House	Thomas E. Cavin House	September 27, 1984 (#84001306)	150 Park Ave. 41°15′36″N 95°50′39″W	Council Bluffs	
7	Chevra B'nai Yisroel Synagogue	Chevra B'nai Yisroel Synagogue	March 7, 2007 (#07000113)	618 Mynster St. 41°15′52″N 95°51′09″W	Council Bluffs	
8	Chicago, Rock Island & Pacific Railroad Passenger Depot	Chicago, Rock Island & Pacific Railroad Passenger Depot	July 21, 1995 (#95000856)	1512 S. Main St. 41°14′49″N 95°51′08″W	Council Bluffs	
9	Council Bluffs Federal Building and Post Office	Council Bluffs Federal Building and Post Office	June 20, 2023 (#100009075)	8 South 6th St. 41°15′39″N 95°51′09″W	Council Bluffs	
10	Council Bluffs Free Public Library	Council Bluffs Free Public Library	January 27, 1999 (#99000048)	200 Pearl St. 41°15′29″N 95°51′04″W	Council Bluffs	
11	Council Bluffs Telephone Exchange	Council Bluffs Telephone Exchange	July 18, 2022 (#100007943)	12 Scott Street; 41°15′42″N 95°51′03″W	Council Bluffs	1930 brick building
12	Grenville M. Dodge House	Grenville M. Dodge House	October 15, 1966 (#66000338)	605 S. 3rd St. 41°15′17″N 95°50′50″W	Council Bluffs	
13	Ruth Anne Dodge Memorial	Ruth Anne Dodge Memorial	February 8, 1980 (#80001457)	Fairview Cemetery; 41°16′02″N 95°50′51″W	Council Bluffs	
14	Eckle Round Barn		June 30, 1986 (#86001470)	Off Iowa Highway 168; 41°30′20″N 95°29′37″W	Shelby	Part of the Iowa Round Barns: The Sixty Year Experiment Thematic Resource (TR). Barn has been demolished, see main article.
15	Shepard and Emma Farnsworth House	Shepard and Emma Farnsworth House	June 29, 2018 (#100002621)	301 S 8th St. 41°15′31″N 95°51′22″W	Council Bluffs	
16	German Bank Building of Walnut, Iowa	German Bank Building of Walnut, Iowa	May 1, 1991 (#91000536)	Junction of Highland and Central Sts. 41°28′39″N 95°13′20″W	Walnut	
17	Graceland Cemetery Chapel	Graceland Cemetery Chapel	April 28, 1986 (#86000873)	Graceland Cemetery, U.S. Route 59; 41°29′32″N 95°20′15″W	Avoca	
18	Haymarket Commercial Historic District	Haymarket Commercial Historic District	April 11, 1985 (#85000774)	S. Main St. 41°15′22″N 95°51′25″W	Council Bluffs	
19	Hotel Chieftain	Hotel Chieftain	June 6, 2014 (#14000286)	38 Pearl St. 41°15′36″N 95°51′03″W	Council Bluffs	
20	Martin Hughes House	Martin Hughes House	September 27, 1984 (#84001310)	903 3rd St. 41°15′11″N 95°50′53″W	Council Bluffs	
21	Hughes-Irons Motor Company	Hughes-Irons Motor Company	June 23, 2011 (#11000392)	149-161 W. Broadway; 41°15′45″N 95°50′42″W	Council Bluffs	
22	Thomas Jefferis House	Thomas Jefferis House	December 25, 1979 (#79000928)	523 6th Ave. 41°15′21″N 95°51′07″W	Council Bluffs	
23	Lincoln-Fairview Historic District	Lincoln-Fairview Historic District	April 10, 2007 (#07000281)	Roughly bounded by W. Kanesville Boulevard, Oakland Ave., Fairview Cemetery, and N. 1st St. 41°15′58″N 95°50′51″W	Council Bluffs	
24	Masonic Temple of Walnut		February 23, 2026 (#100012740)	304 Antique City Drive; 41°28′39″N 95°13′20″W	Walnut	
25	McCormick Harvesting Machine Company Building	McCormick Harvesting Machine Company Building	September 10, 2012 (#12000780)	1001 S. 6th St. 41°15′09″N 95°51′11″W	Council Bluffs	
26	Charles Henry and Charlotte Norton House	Charles Henry and Charlotte Norton House	December 30, 2004 (#04001401)	401 N. Chestnut St. 41°28′47″N 95°20′11″W	Avoca	
27	Park/Glen Avenues Historic District	Park/Glen Avenues Historic District	April 7, 2010 (#10000160)	101-508 Glen Ave., 102-471 Park Ave., 209 & 301 W. Pierce, & 524 & 600 Huntington; 41°15′32″N 95°50′38″W	Council Bluffs	
28	Pioneer Implement Company	Pioneer Implement Company	April 30, 2008 (#08000357)	1000 S. Main St. 41°15′09″N 95°51′06″W	Council Bluffs	
29	Pottawattamie County Jail	Pottawattamie County Jail	March 16, 1972 (#72000481)	226 Pearl St. 41°16′35″N 95°50′39″W	Council Bluffs	Designated a National Historic Landmark in 2023; it is one of very few surviving rotary jails.
30	Pottawattamie County Sub Courthouse	Pottawattamie County Sub Courthouse	July 2, 1981 (#81000265)	Elm St. 41°28′41″N 95°20′19″W	Avoca	part of the County Courthouses in Iowa TR
31	Reverend Little's Young Ladies Seminary	Reverend Little's Young Ladies Seminary	February 4, 1982 (#82002637)	541 6th Ave. 41°15′22″N 95°51′08″W	Council Bluffs	
32	St. Peter's Church and Rectory	St. Peter's Church and Rectory	July 24, 1992 (#92000923)	1 Bluff St. 41°15′37″N 95°50′50″W	Council Bluffs	
33	Sandwich–Marseilles Manufacturing Building	Sandwich–Marseilles Manufacturing Building	May 27, 2014 (#14000253)	1216–1230 S. Main St. 41°14′59″N 95°51′07″W	Council Bluffs	
34	John J. and Agnes Shea House	John J. and Agnes Shea House	November 22, 1995 (#95001315)	309 S. 8th St. 41°15′29″N 95°51′19″W	Council Bluffs	
35	South 8th Street Historic District		June 25, 2020 (#100005299)	Bounded by South 7th St., South 8th St., 1st Ave., 7th Ave., with segment along 2nd Ave. extending to South 10th St. 41°15′30″N 95°51′20″W	Council Bluffs	
36	State Savings Bank	State Savings Bank	June 4, 1984 (#84001312)	509 W. Broadway; 41°15′39″N 95°51′02″W	Council Bluffs	
37	Lysander Tulleys House	Lysander Tulleys House	October 18, 1979 (#79000929)	151 Park Ave. 41°15′37″N 95°50′38″W	Council Bluffs	
38	Francis A. and Rose M. Turner House	Francis A. and Rose M. Turner House	January 31, 1997 (#96001583)	1004 Cherry St. 41°30′06″N 95°20′06″W	Avoca	
39	O.P. Wickham House	O.P. Wickham House	June 18, 1979 (#79000930)	616 S. 7th St. 41°15′19″N 95°51′17″W	Council Bluffs	
40	Wickham-De Vol House	Wickham-De Vol House	May 4, 1995 (#95000557)	332 Willow Ave. 41°15′30″N 95°50′54″W	Council Bluffs	
41	Willow-Bluff-3rd Street Historic District	Willow-Bluff-3rd Street Historic District	September 15, 2005 (#05001019)	Roughly bounded by Worth, High School Ave., Clark Ave., and the western side of Bluff St. 41°15′24″N 95°50′51″W	Council Bluffs	
42	Y.M.C.A. Building	Y.M.C.A. Building	June 27, 1979 (#79000931)	628 1st Ave. 41°15′37″N 95°51′13″W	Council Bluffs	

== Former listings ==
	Name on the Register	Image	Date listed	Date removed	Location	City or town	Description
1	Hancock Savings Bank		January 19, 1983 (#83000401)	December 19, 2014	311 Main St. 41°23′27″N 95°21′43″W	Hancock	
2	Ogden House		September 13, 1976 (#76000803)	March 27, 2007	169 West Broadway; 41°15′44″N 95°50′44″W	Council Bluffs	Demolished in March, 1982.
3	South Omaha Bridge	South Omaha Bridge	June 29, 1992 (#92000742)	July 14, 2011	U.S. Route 275/Nebraska Highway 92 over the Missouri River; 41°12′47″N 95°55′57″W	Council Bluffs	Spanned Missouri River to Council Bluffs, Iowa; part of the Highway Bridges in Nebraska Multiple Property Submission (MPS); demolished in February and March 2010

== See also ==
- List of National Historic Landmarks in Iowa
- National Register of Historic Places listings in Iowa
- Listings in neighboring counties: Cass, Douglas (NE), Harrison, Mills, Montgomery, Sarpy (NE), Shelby, Washington (NE)
