= German Bank =

German Bank may refer to:

Germany

- Deutsche Bank
- Deutsche Bundesbank
- Banking in Germany

United States

- German Bank (Evansville, Indiana)
- German Bank (Dubuque, Iowa)
- German Bank Building of Walnut, Iowa
- German Bank Building, Louisville, Kentucky
- German-American Bank Building, St. Joseph, Missouri
