= J. Chris Jensen =

American architect

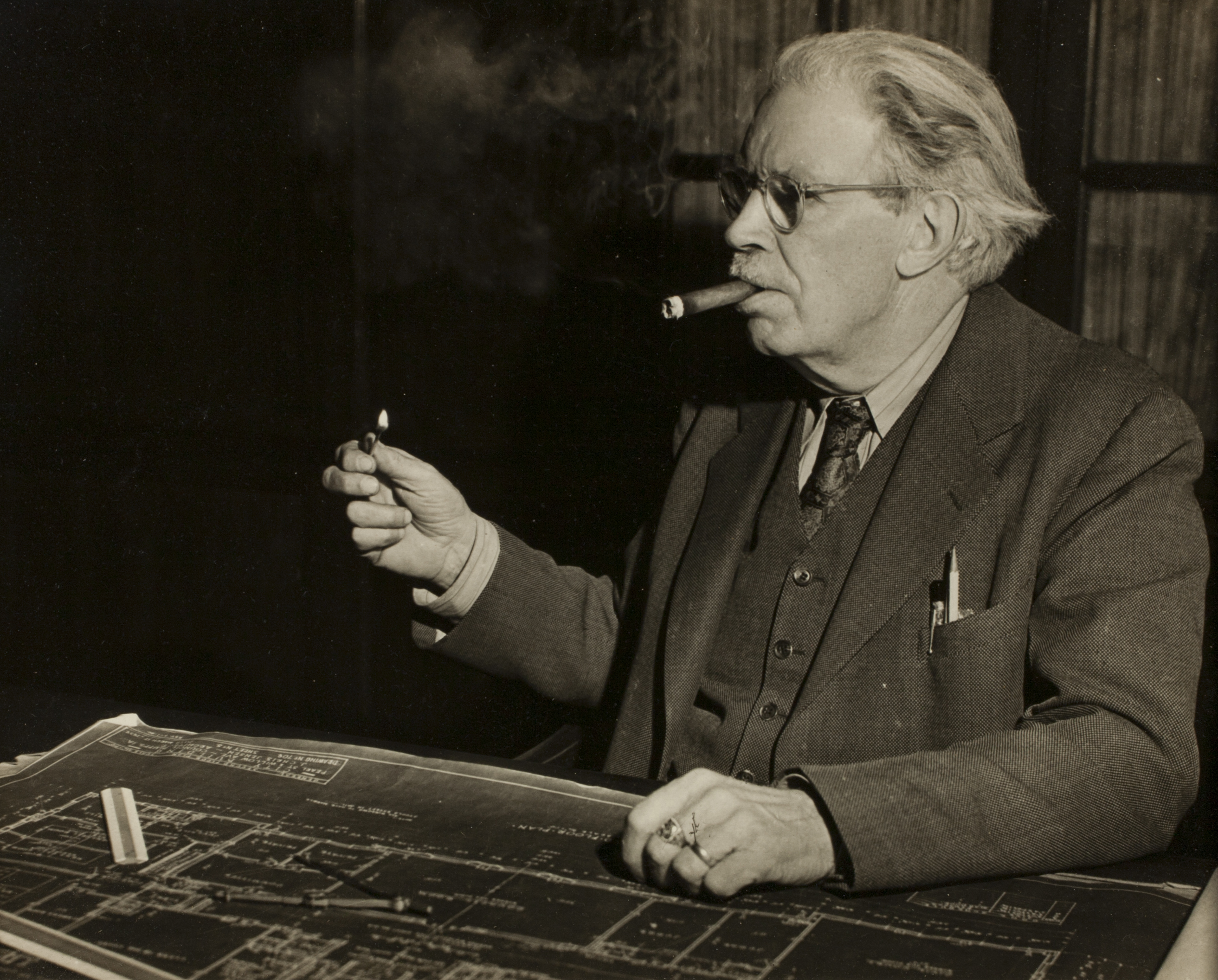
J. Chris Jensen, architect.

J. Chris Jensen (born c. 1872, Denmark) was a notable architect from Council Bluffs, Iowa. He designed 773 buildings during his lifetime across several states in the Midwest and West, including five listed in the National Register of Historic Places. His family emigrated from Denmark when he was 8 years old, and he raised a family of four sons and five daughters in Council Bluffs.

== Architecture ==
Jensen designed numerous buildings, ranging from private residences to factories to places of worship and large, public buildings. The majority were in and around Council Bluffs, though several were farther afield.

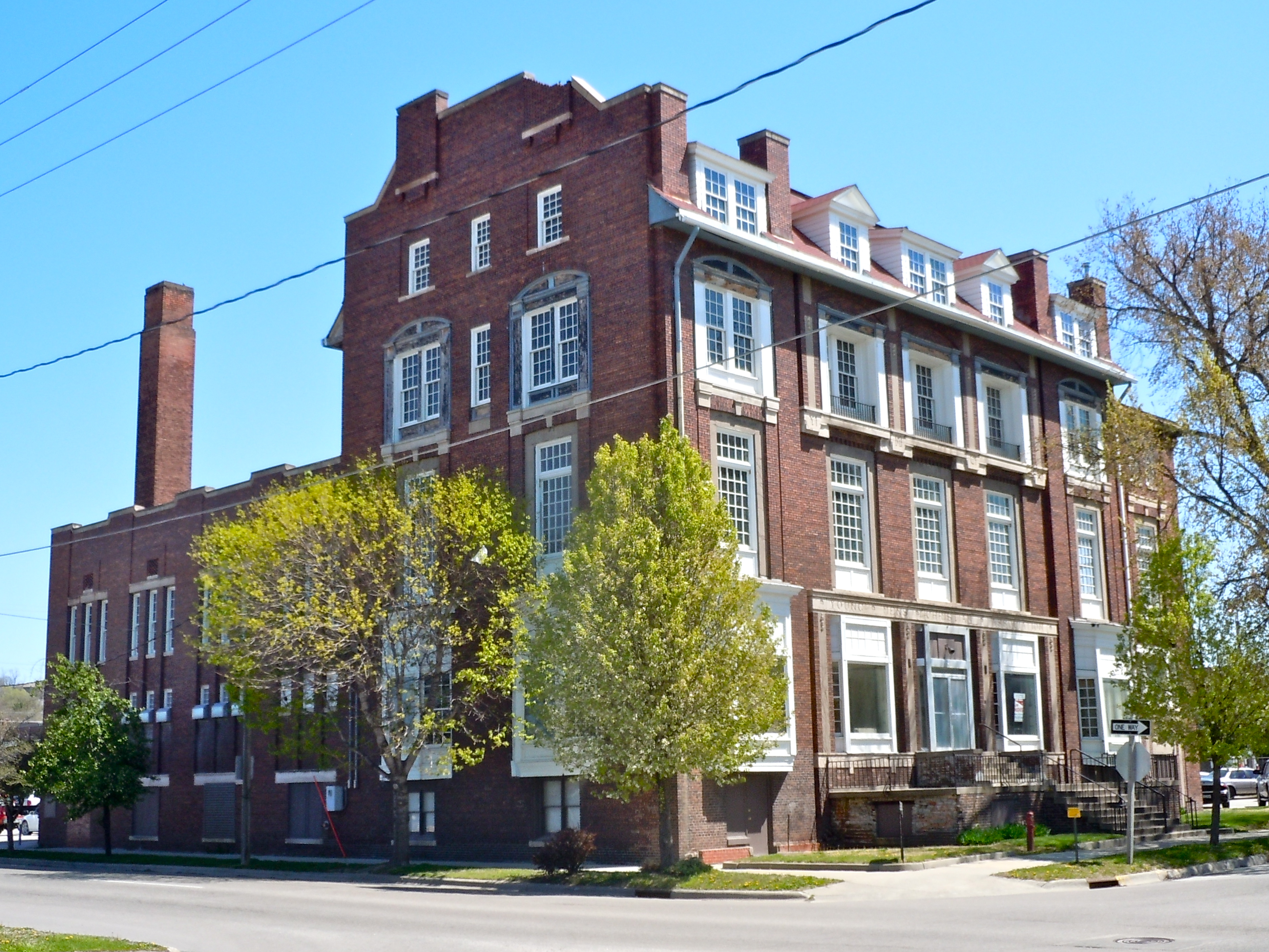
Former YMCA building in Council Bluffs.

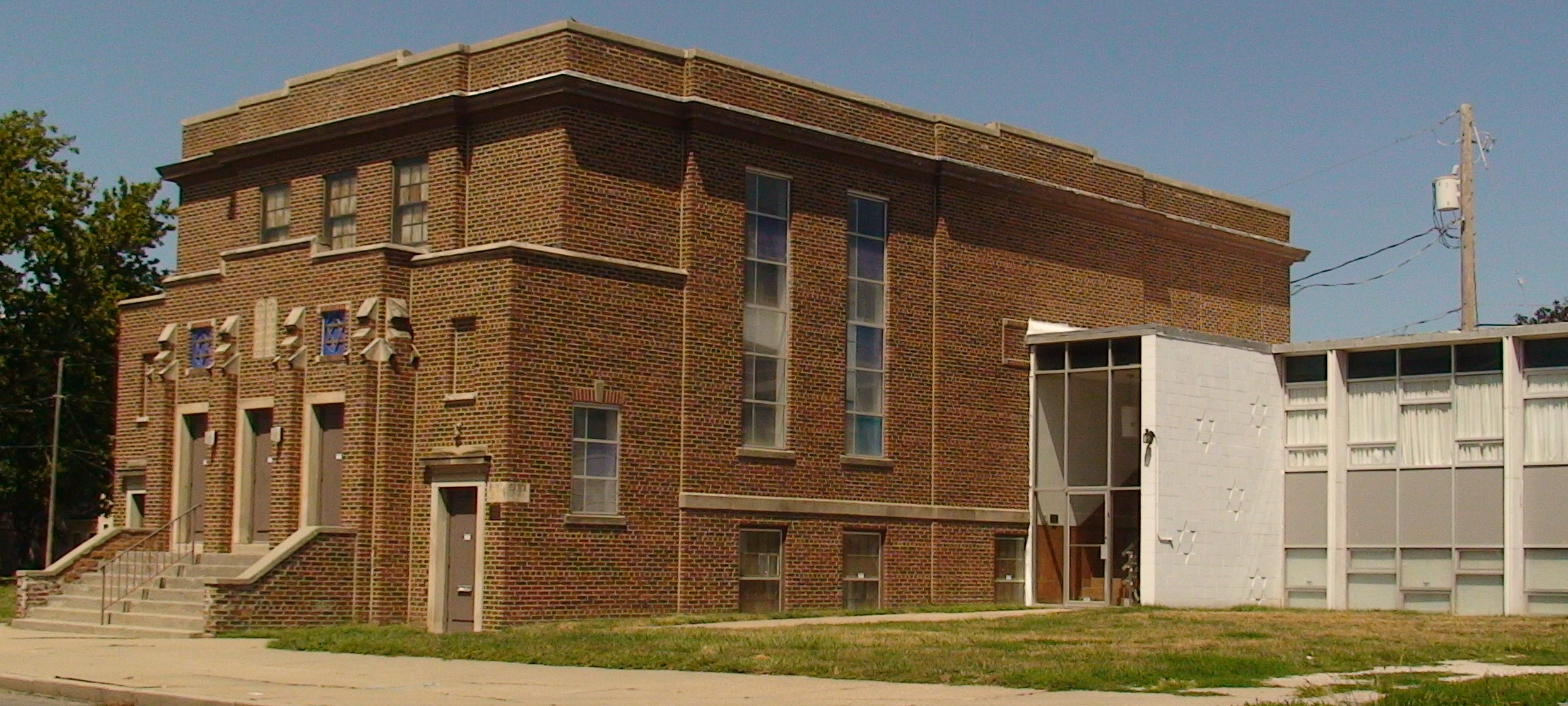
B'nai Israel Synagogue in Council Bluffs.

Selected works:

- New City Hall, Council Bluffs
- Woodward Candy Factory, Council Bluffs
- Hughes-Irons Motor Company, Council Bluffs (National Register 06/23/2011, record no. 491332)
- Bennett Building (Council Bluffs, Iowa) (National Register 08/08/2001, record no. 347911)
- B'nai Israel Synagogue (Council Bluffs, Iowa) (National Register 03/07/2007, record no. 356109)
- Former YMCA building, rear extension, Council Bluffs (National Register 06/27/1979, record no. 79000931)
- Evans–Elbert Ranch, Evergreen, Colorado (National Register 9/11/1980, record no. 381360)
- Thomas Jefferson High School, Council Bluffs
- Bloomer Elementary School, Council Bluffs
- Jennie Edmundson Hospital, Council Bluffs
- 300 Safeway-brand stores across multiple locations
- J. Chris Jensen House, 520 Oakland Ave, Council Bluffs
- Contributor to buildings in the Lincoln-Fairview Historic District, Council Bluffs, along with many other architects (National Register 04/10/2007, record no. 356268)
