= State Savings Bank =

State Savings Bank may refer to:

- State Savings Bank (Council Bluffs, Iowa), listed on the National Register of Historic Places in Pottawattamie County, Iowa
- State Savings Bank (Logan, Iowa), listed on the National Register of Historic Places in Harrison County, Iowa
- State Savings Bank (Quasqueton, Iowa), listed on the National Register of Historic Places in Buchanan County, Iowa
- Savoyard Centre, also known as State Savings Bank, Detroit, Michigan, listed on NRHP in Wayne County, Michigan
- State Savings Bank of Ukraine, also known as Savings Bank or Oshchad Bank
- Queensland Government Savings Bank, a former bank in Australia
