= Henry Norton =

Henry Norton may refer to:

- Henry L. Norton (1873–1932), American sculptor and manufacturer of bronze tablets
- Sir Henry Norton, 2nd Baronet (c. 1632–c. 1690), English politician

== See also ==
- Charles Henry and Charlotte Norton House, a historic building in Avoca, Iowa, United States
