= Pioneer Implement Company =

- U.S. National Register of Historic Places
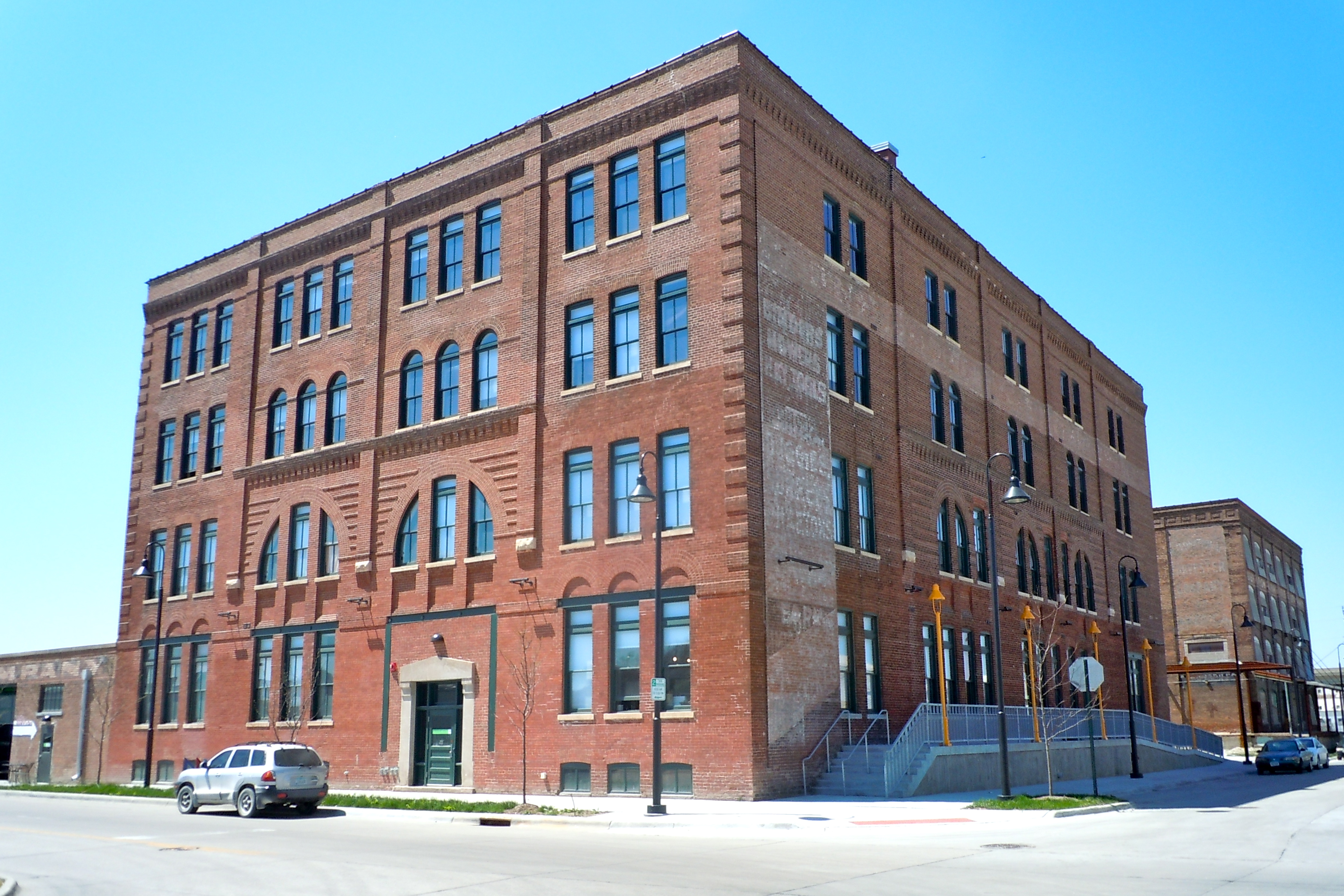

- Location within Iowa Location within the United States
- Location: 1000 S. Main St. Council Bluffs, Iowa
- Coordinates: 41°15′08.1″N 95°51′06.8″W
- Built: 1893, 1927
- Architectural style: Late Victorian
- NRHP reference No.: 08000357
- Added to NRHP: April 30, 2008

The Pioneer Implement Company, also known as the International Harvester Transfer House, is a historic building located in Council Bluffs, Iowa, United States. Eli Shugart, Ferdinand Weis and F.R. Davis formed Pioneer Implement Company in 1893, and they built the four-story Late Victorian section of the building the same year. This was during a period of growth in the city's "Implement District," which is located to the south of the central business district. What made this company standout from the others in the district is that it was locally owned and operated agricultural implement business, rather than one owned by a factory from the east. The company went out of business in 1915 and the building was taken over by International Harvester, which owned the building next door. They added the single-story brick addition to the south in 1927. When IH closed their Council Bluffs operation in 1964 they were the only farm implement that was still in business in the Implement District. The building was occupied by various businesses after that, including United Parcel Service. Artspace, Inc. acquired the building and converted it into live/work spaces for artists. The building was listed on the National Register of Historic Places in 2008.
