= Park/Glen Avenues Historic District =

Historic district in Iowa, United States

- U.S. National Register of Historic Places
- U.S. Historic district
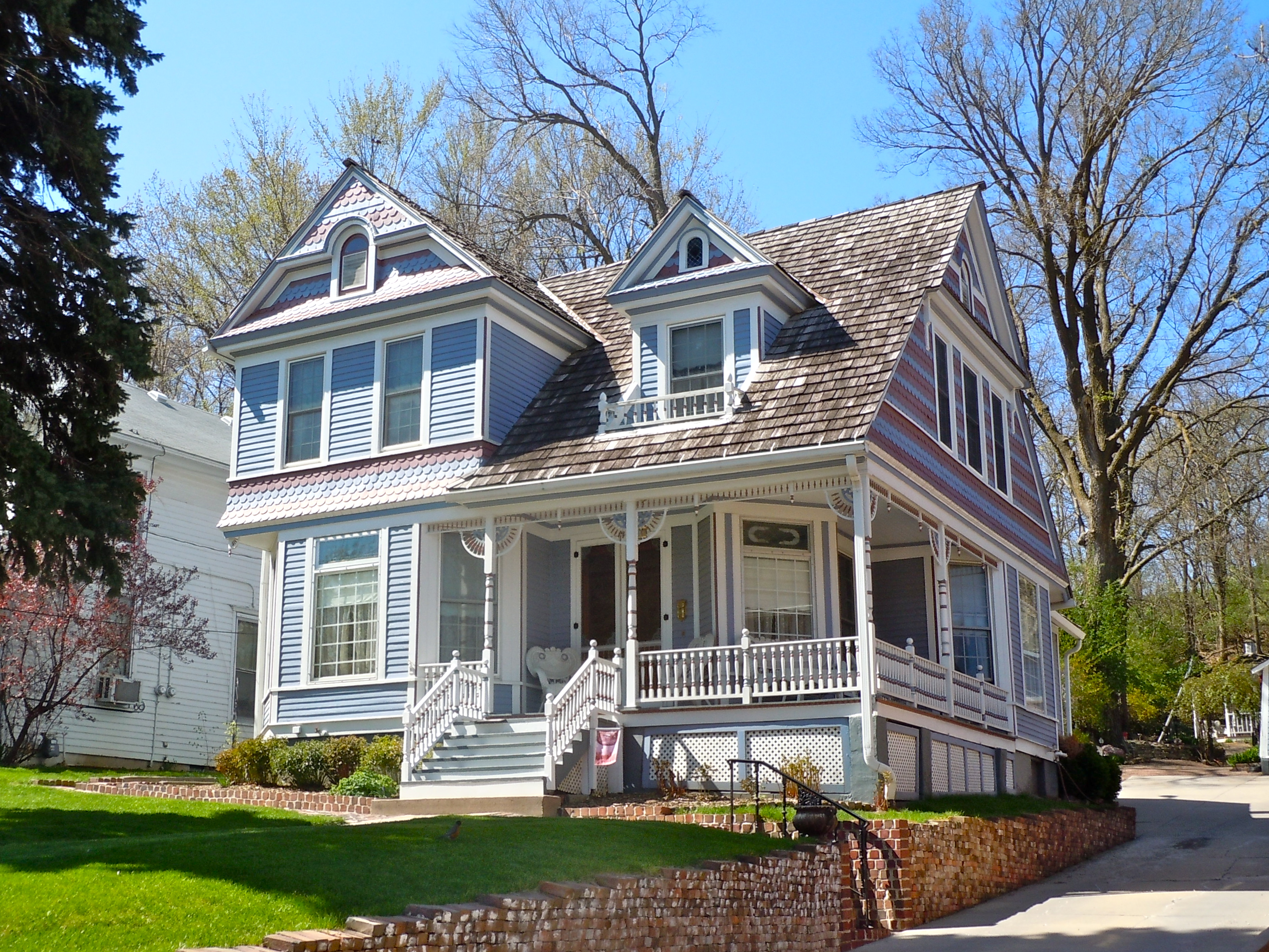

- Location within Iowa Location within the United States
- Location: 101-508 Glen Ave., 102-471 Park Ave., 209 & 301 W. Pierce, & 524 & 600 Huntington, Council Bluffs, Iowa
- Coordinates: 41°15′32″N 95°50′38″W
- Area: 40 acres (16 ha)
- Built by: Wickham Bros.
- Architect: Perley Hale
- Architectural style: Federal; Late Victorian
- NRHP reference No.: 10000160
- Added to NRHP: April 7, 2010

The Park/Glen Avenues Historic District is a nationally recognized historic district located in Council Bluffs, Iowa, United States. It was listed on the National Register of Historic Places in 2010. At the time of its nomination the district consisted of 228 resources, including 179 contributing buildings, one contributing site, five contributing structures, three contributing objects, and 43 non-contributing buildings. The district is a stylish residential neighborhood that developed between 1857 and 1942 with most of the houses built between 1880 and 1930. It was home to the area's "prosperous, second generation merchants, railroad and real estate financiers, and professionals." Several houses have been attributed to architects, including Perley Hale from Chicago, and local architects J. Chris Jensen, and John C. and Winfield S. Woodward. The Lysander Tulleys House (1877) and the Thomas E. Cavin House (1887) are individually listed on the National Register of Historic Places. A non-residential building in the district is the Glendale Reservoir Pumping Station (1942).
