= German Bank Building =

- U.S. National Register of Historic Places
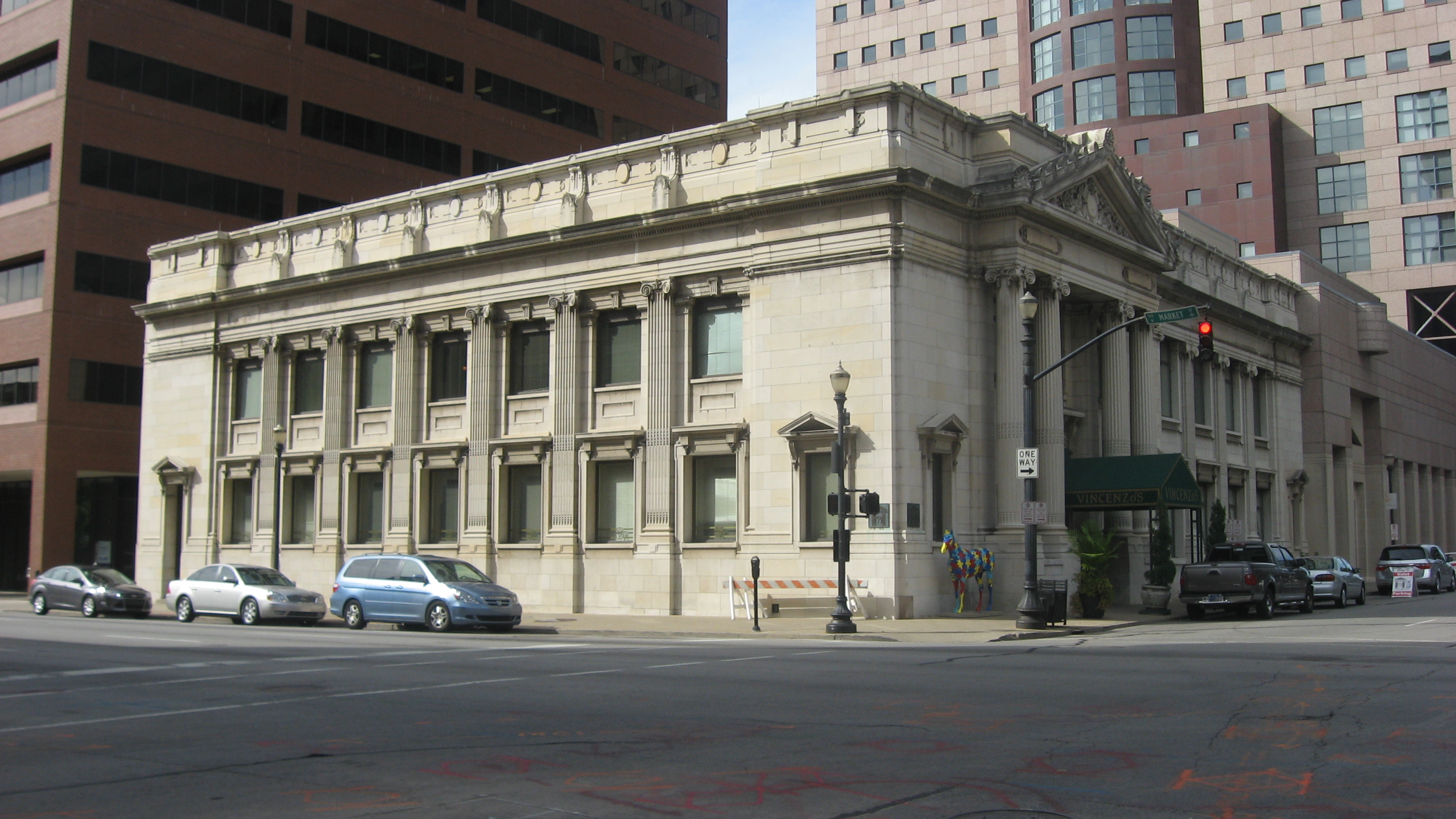
- Southern side and front

- Location within Kentucky Location within the United States
- Location: 150 S. 5th St., Louisville, Kentucky
- Coordinates: 38°15′20″N 85°45′31″W
- Built: 1914
- Architect: D. X. Murphy and Bros.
- Architectural style: Beaux-Arts
- NRHP reference No.: 84000029
- Added to NRHP: October 11, 1984

The German Bank Building, known also as Louisville Home Federal Building, is a historic building in Downtown Louisville, Kentucky, United States. It is located on the corner of Fifth and Market streets. The two-story structure was built in 1914 in a Beaux-Arts style with a limestone facade. In 1918, the name of the building was changed to Louisville National Bank. This was during World War I when many institutions changed names to avoid association with Germany.

The building was listed on the National Register of Historic Places in 1984, for its architecture.
