= Ruth Anne Dodge Memorial =

- U.S. National Register of Historic Places
- U.S. Historic district – Contributing property
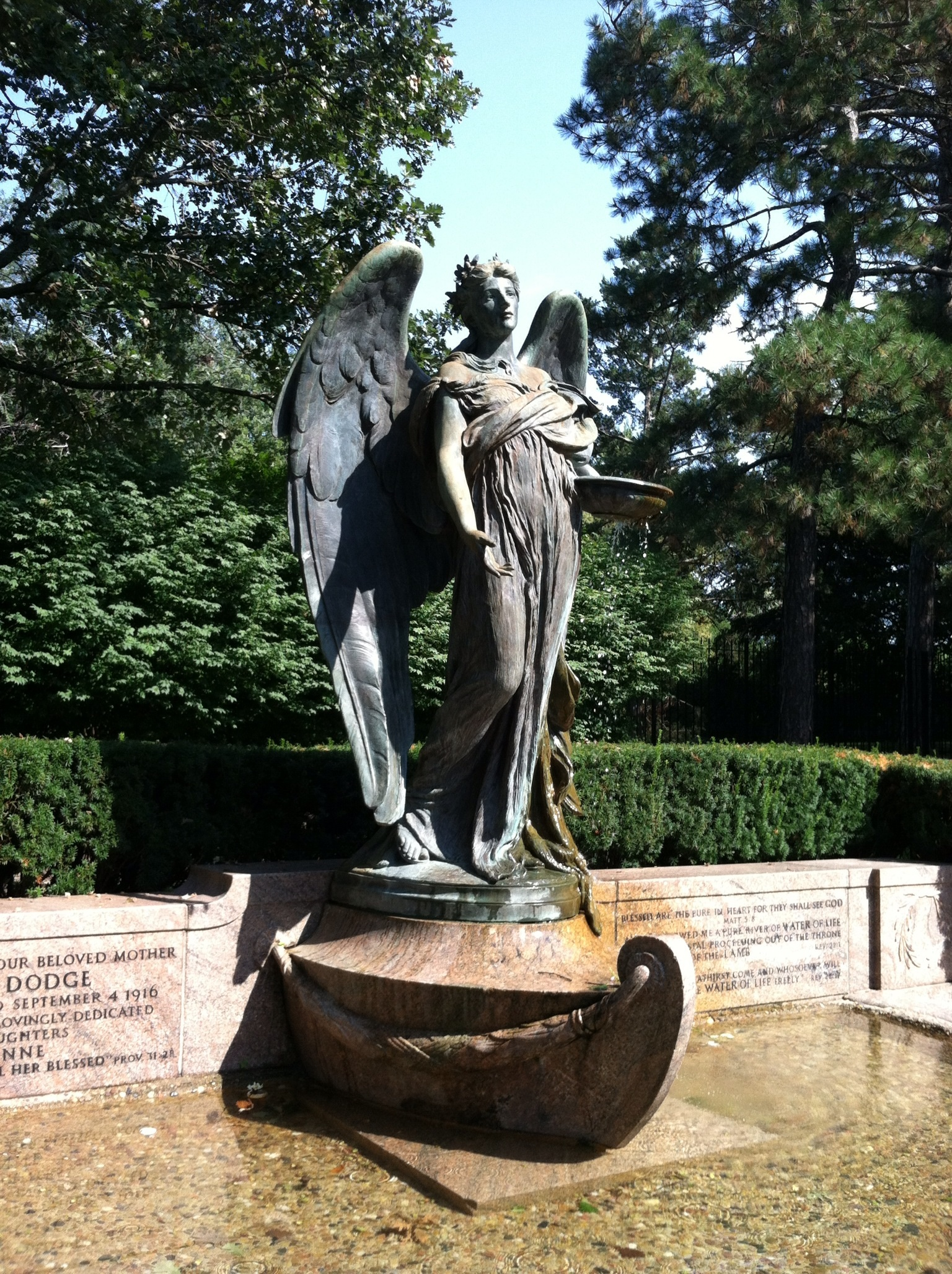

- Location within Iowa Location within the United States
- Location: Fairview Cemetery; Council Bluffs, Iowa
- Coordinates: 41°16′04″N 95°50′55″W
- Built: 1916-1918
- Architect: Daniel Chester French; Henry Bacon
- Part of: Lincoln-Fairview Historic District (ID05001019)
- NRHP reference No.: 80001457
- Added to NRHP: February 8, 1980

The Ruth Anne Dodge Memorial, also known as the Black Angel, is a historic object located in Council Bluffs, Iowa, United States. This is the only work in Iowa by the American sculptor Daniel Chester French. The cast bronze sculpture stands along the edge of Fairview Cemetery as a tribute to Ruth Anne Dodge, the wife of railroad magnate Grenville M. Dodge. The 8.5-foot (2.6 m) tall angel holds a water basin and is wreathed in laurel. Its pedestal is a representation of a ship's prow with a garland swag, carved in pink marble. The pedestal, platform and reflecting pool are the work of New York architect Henry Bacon. The work was commissioned by Dodge's daughters Anne Dodge and Ella Dodge Pusey. It represents a recurring dream their mother had as she was dying of cancer. An angel with a bowl of water approached her and urged her to drink. During the third occurrence of the dream Mrs. Dodge took a drink and she died not long after. The sculpture was individually listed on the National Register of Historic Places in 1980. In 2007 it was included as a contributing property in the Lincoln-Fairview Historic District.

== See also ==
- Public sculptures by Daniel Chester French
