= John J. and Agnes Shea House =

Historic house in Iowa, United States

- U.S. National Register of Historic Places
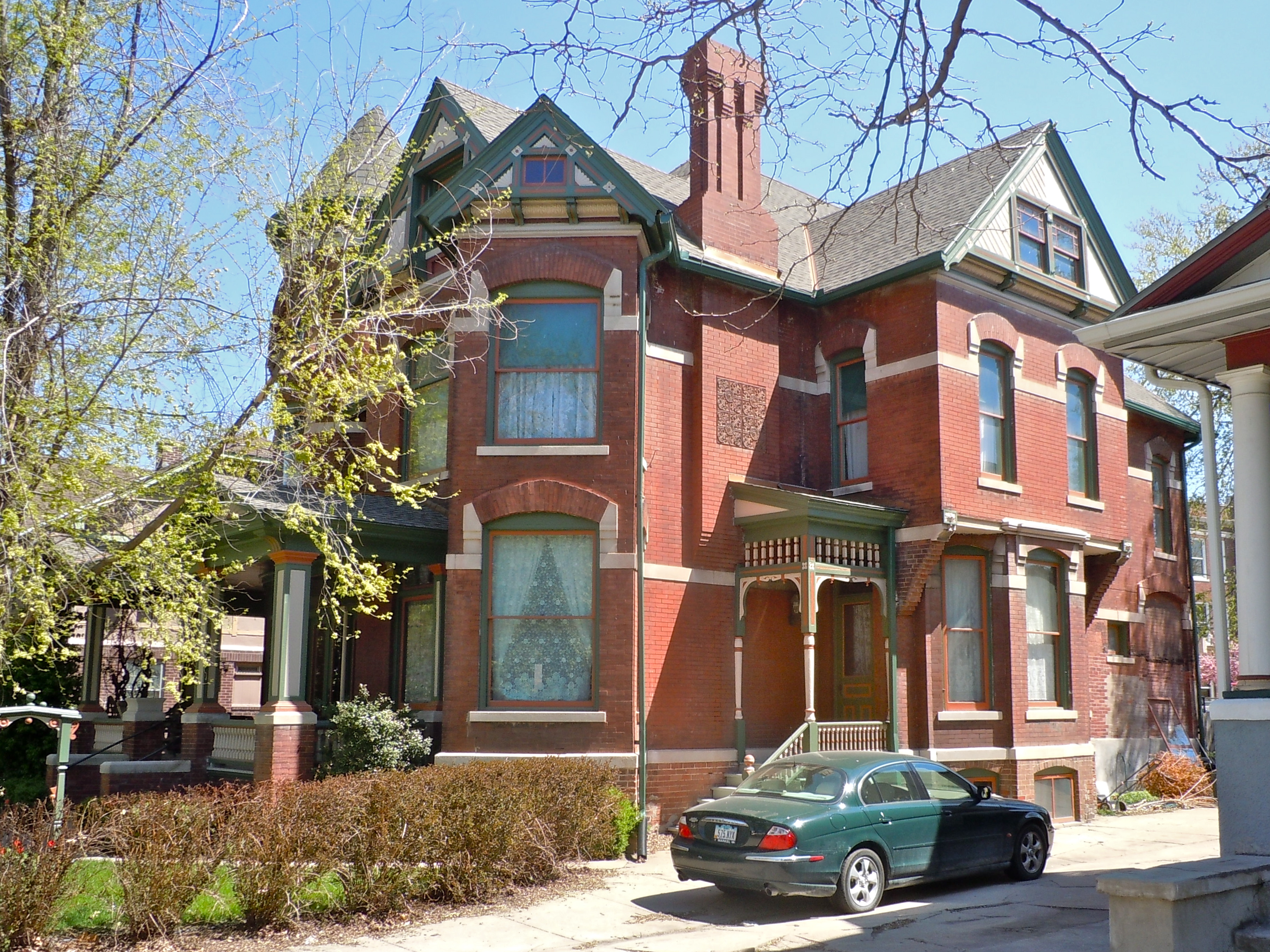

- Location within Iowa Location within the United States
- Location: 309 S. 8th St. Council Bluffs, Iowa
- Coordinates: 41.25821653789269°N 95.85573200574377°W
- Area: less than one acre
- Built: 1888
- Built by: George Monroe
- Architectural style: Queen Anne
- NRHP reference No.: 95001315
- Added to NRHP: November 22, 1995

The John J. and Agnes Shea House is a historic building located in Council Bluffs, Iowa, United States. This is the only brick Queen Anne house in the city with a corner tower topped by a witch's cap. The 2½-story structure features an asymmetrical plan, complex roofline, corbelled chimneys, gables, bays, and porches. It also contains beveled, rounded and stained glass windows. The house was built by local contractor George Monroe, with brick work done by the Wickham Brothers and carpentry work by J.H. Murphy. It was built for John Joseph Shea, a local attorney, his wife Agnes Mary Fenlon Shea, and their six children. They moved to Indian Territory, and after it became the state of Oklahoma, Shea became a judge. Local banker Timothy G. Turner acquired the house in 1900 before the Sheas left for Indian Territory. It was listed on the National Register of Historic Places in 1995.
