= Graceland Cemetery Chapel =

Historic site in Pottawattamie County, Iowa

- U.S. National Register of Historic Places
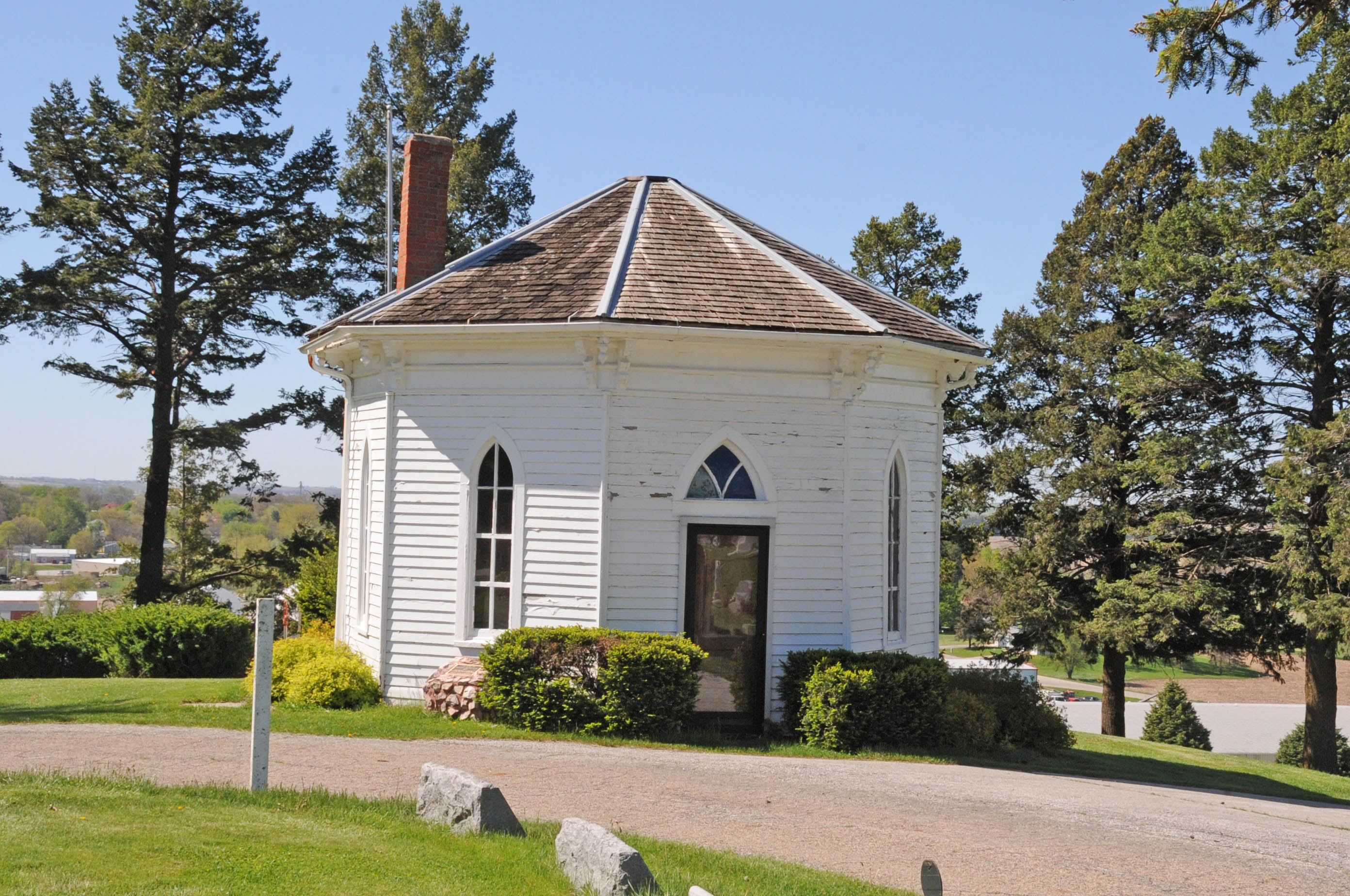

- Location within Iowa Location within the United States
- Location: Graceland Cemetery, U.S. Route 59; Avoca, Iowa
- Coordinates: 41°29′31.8″N 95°20′15.8″W
- Area: less than one acre
- Built: 1875
- Architectural style: Gothic Revival
- NRHP reference No.: 86000873
- Added to NRHP: April 28, 1986

Graceland Cemetery Chapel is a historic building located in Avoca, Iowa, United States. The frame octagon-shaped building was constructed about 1875 in Graceland Cemetery, the town's public cemetery. The building's architecture has picturesque qualities to it, and it embodies various revival themes. Its narrow, pilastered corners and the entablature along the roof line evoke the Greek Revival, its pointed arch windows and doorways the Gothic Revival, and its wide bracketed eaves the Italianate. Its interior is an open space with built-in benches along the walls. Over the years the building has been used as a place for funerals, a temporary mausoleum, the sexton's office, and storage. It was listed on the National Register of Historic Places in 1986.
