= 100 Block of West Broadway Historic District =

Historic district in Iowa, United States

- 100 Block of West Broadway; Historic District
- U.S. National Register of Historic Places
- U.S. Historic district
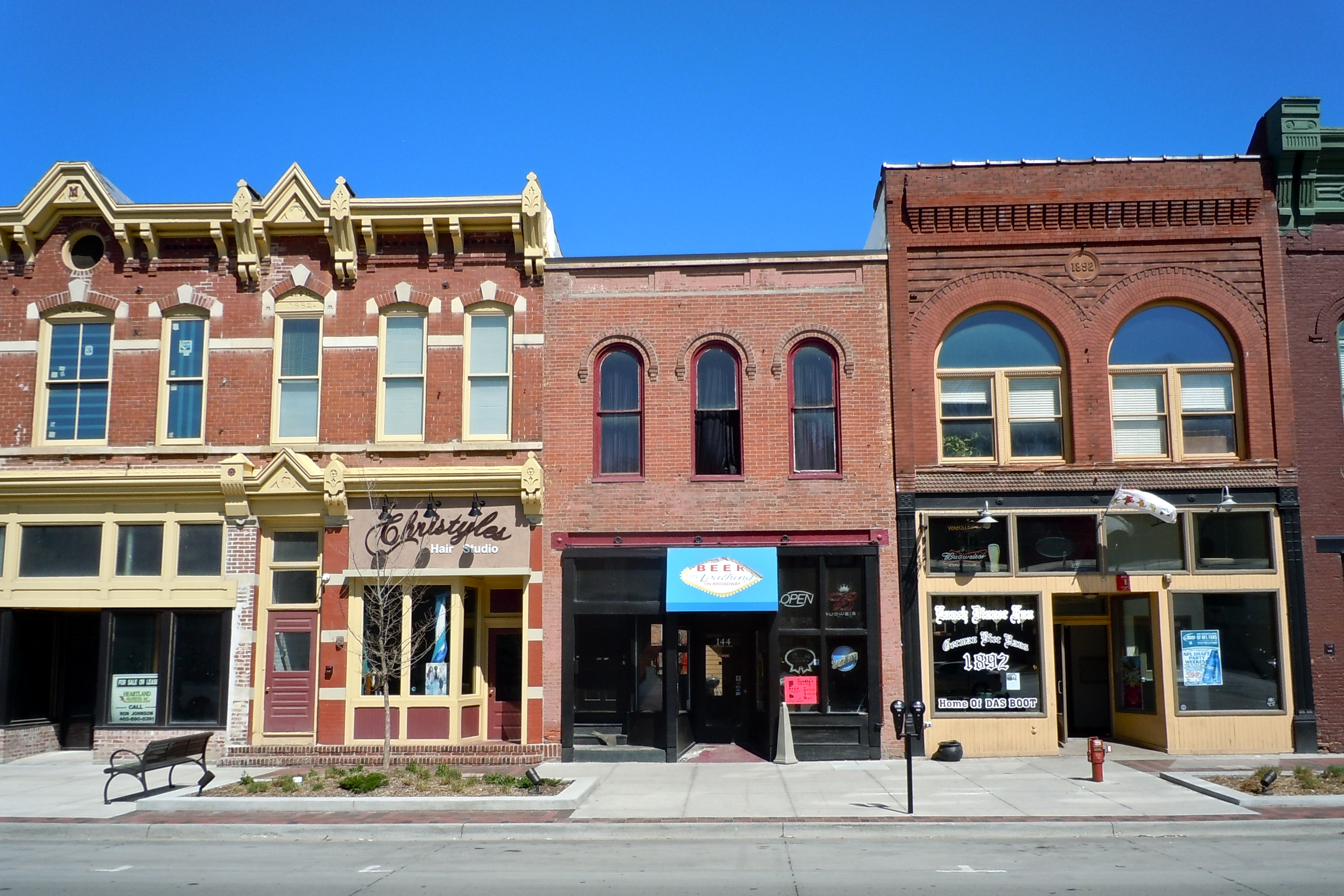

- Location within Iowa Location within the United States
- Location: W. Broadway, 1st St., and 4th St., Council Bluffs, Iowa
- Coordinates: 41°15′46″N 95°50′42″W
- Area: 4 acres (1.6 ha)
- Architectural style: Late Victorian; Mission/Spanish Revival
- NRHP reference No.: 02000455
- Added to NRHP: May 9, 2002

The 100 Block of West Broadway Historic District is a nationally recognized historic district located in Council Bluffs, Iowa, United States. It was listed on the National Register of Historic Places in 2002. At the time of its nomination the district consisted of 30 resources, including 22 contributing buildings, and eight non-contributing buildings. The linear district on the east side of the central business district is the north side of Broadway. Developed between mid-1850s and 1928, it is the only section of the street that has maintained its historical integrity. The buildings are one to three stories tall with commercial space on the main floor. While many are vernacular commercial structures, others are the various revival styles of Victorian architecture.
