= Pottawattamie County Sub Courthouse =

- U.S. National Register of Historic Places
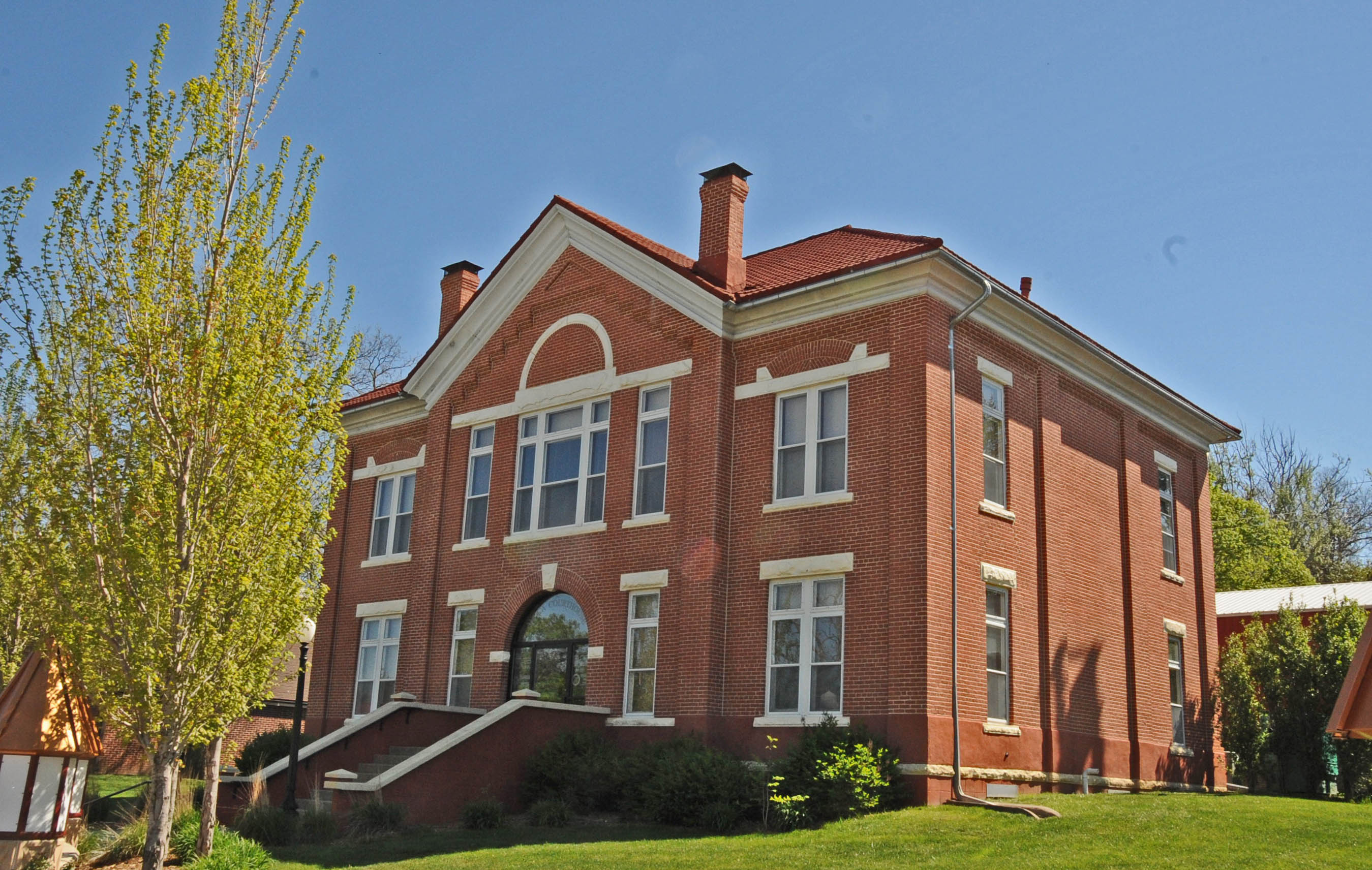

- Location within Iowa Location within the United States
- Location: Elm St. Avoca, Iowa
- Coordinates: 41°28′41.2″N 95°20′20.5″W
- Area: less than one acre
- Built: 1885
- MPS: County Courthouses in Iowa TR
- NRHP reference No.: 81000265
- Added to NRHP: July 2, 1981

The Pottawattamie County Sub Courthouse is located in Avoca, Iowa, United States. Because Pottawattamie County is wide geographically, and the county seat in Council Bluffs is located at its western edge, this sub courthouse was located in the eastern portion of the county. It is Iowa's only branch county courthouse. Built in 1885 and refurbished in 1998, the building is simple, compact, and functional. It was listed on the National Register of Historic Places in 1981. As of 2011, the building was used to house several county offices and the local historical society.
