= Jean and Inez Bregant House =

Historic house in Iowa, United States

- U.S. National Register of Historic Places
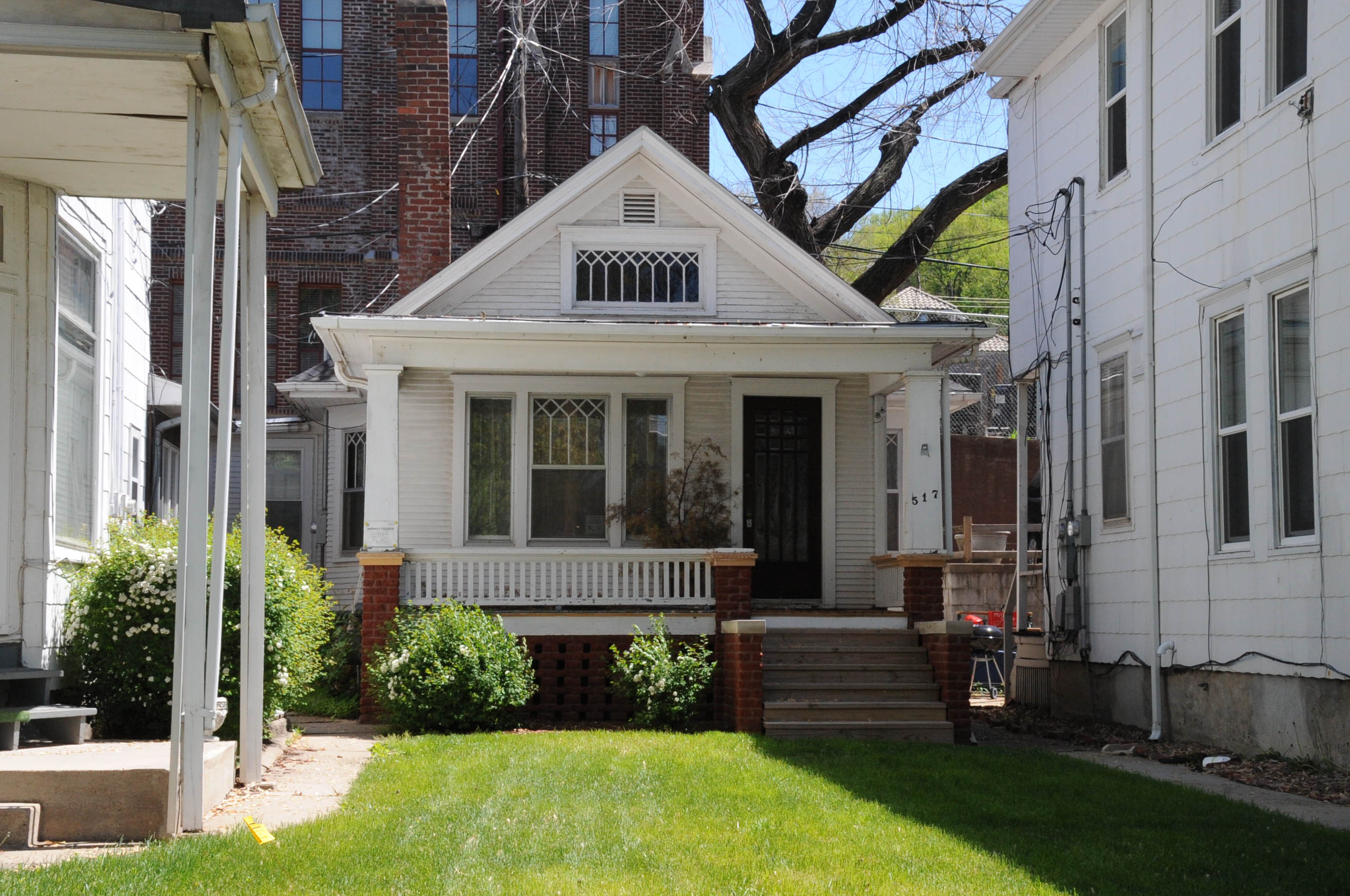

- Location within Iowa Location within the United States
- Location: 517 S. 4th St. Council Bluffs, Iowa
- Coordinates: 41°15′22.4″N 95°50′58.3″W
- Area: less than one acre
- Built: 1912
- Architectural style: Bungalow/Craftsman
- NRHP reference No.: 13000832
- Added to NRHP: October 16, 2013

The Jean and Inez Bregant House, also known as The Little Peoples' House, is a historic building located in Council Bluffs, Iowa, United States. The Bregants were little people who worked as Vaudeville performers. This 1½-story Craftsman was one of the few houses built in the United States for little people. The rectangular frame structure sits at the back of its lot. The house was built by Inez's parents, whose house was immediately to the south, after Jean and Inez retired from performing. It features a polygonal bay on the north side, and rectangular bay on the south, and a full size bungloid porch across the front. The interior has four rooms and a bath. Because the Bregants loved to entertain, the rooms, doorways and furnishings accommodated full-size people. However, it also had a miniature clawfoot bathtub, stove, a low fireplace mantel, built-in benches that sat low-to-the-ground, as well as other scaled-down details. After Inez died in 1969, the house was home to average sized people who undid some of its original details. It is now owned by Preserve Council Bluffs who is restoring it to its original condition. The house was listed on the National Register of Historic Places in 2013.
