= German Bank (Evansville, Indiana) =

- U.S. National Register of Historic Places
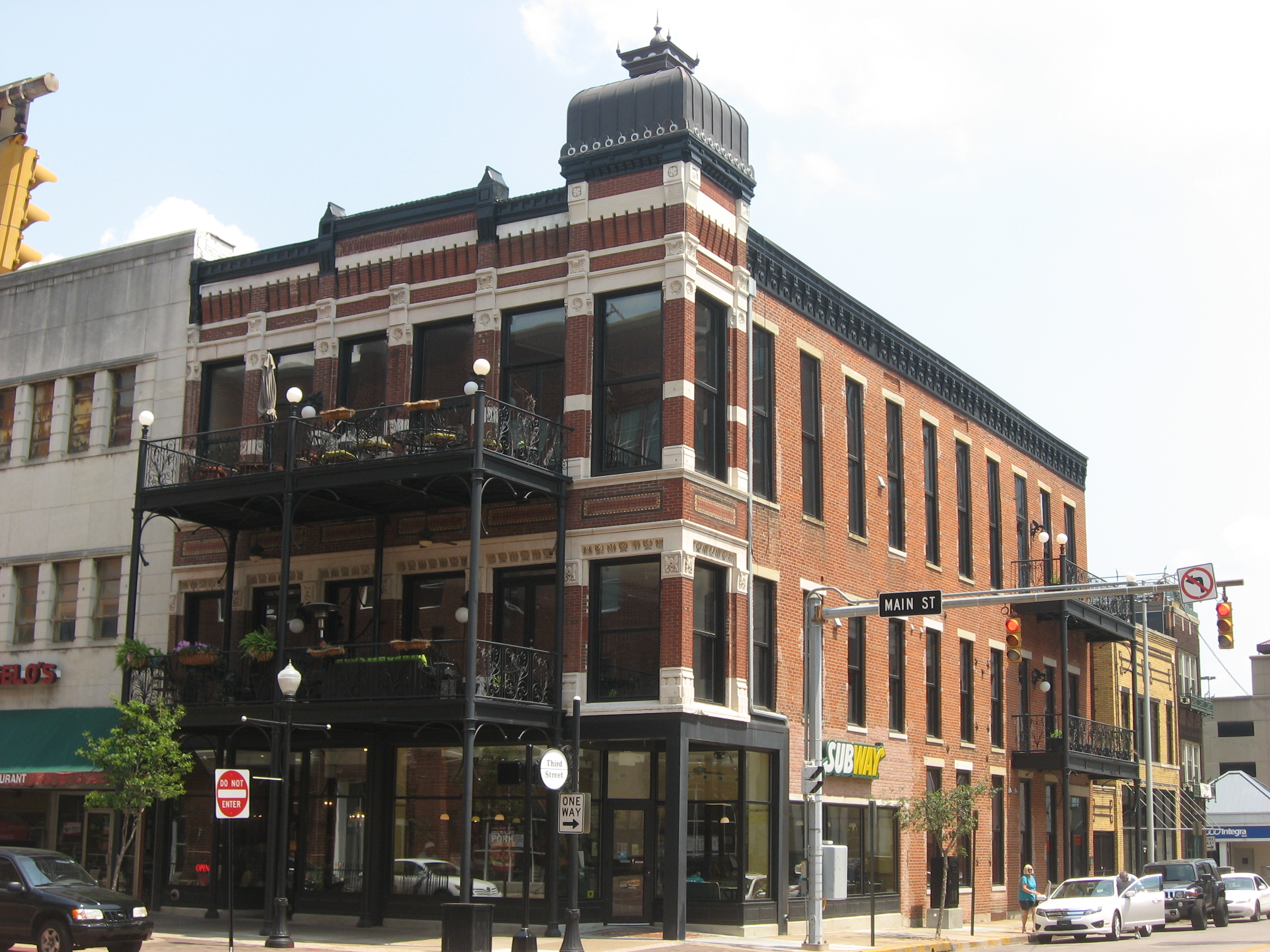
- German Bank, July 2011

- Location within Indiana Location within the United States
- Location: 301-303 Main St., Evansville, Indiana
- Coordinates: 37°58′15″N 87°34′19″W
- Area: less than one acre
- Built: 1857
- Architectural style: Italianate
- MPS: Downtown Evansville MRA
- NRHP reference No.: 82000097
- Added to NRHP: July 1, 1982

German Bank is a historic commercial building located in downtown Evansville, Indiana. It was built in 1857, and is a three-story, Italianate style brick building. The building features a corner tower, encaustic tile, a decorative cornice, and three-story cast iron porch.

It was listed on the National Register of Historic Places in 1982.
