= O.P. Wickham House =

Historic house in Iowa, United States

- U.S. National Register of Historic Places
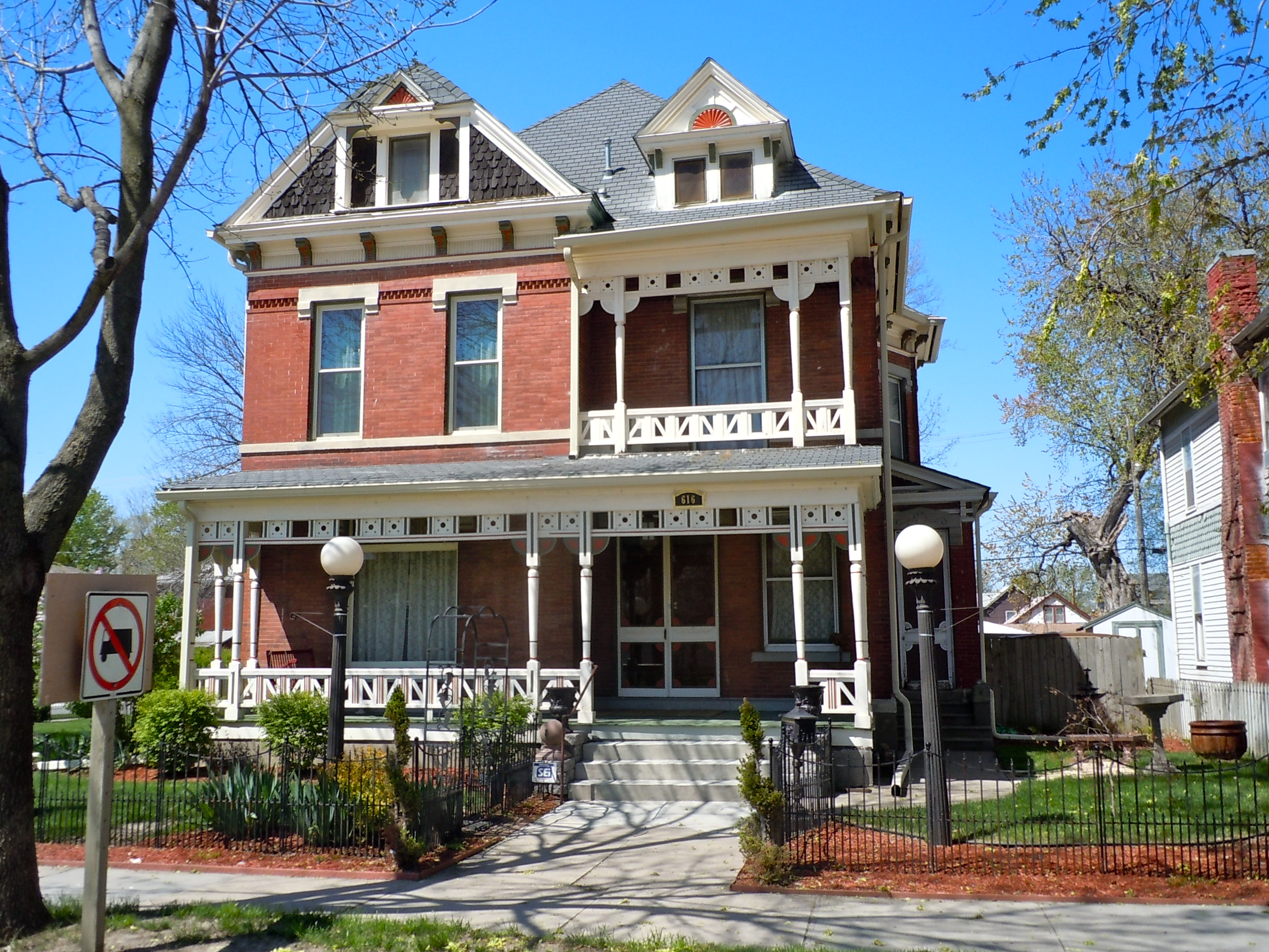

- Location within Iowa Location within the United States
- Location: 616 S. 7th St. Council Bluffs, Iowa
- Coordinates: 41°15′19.6″N 95°51′18.2″W
- Area: less than one acre
- Built: 1888
- Built by: Wickham Bros.
- Architectural style: Queen Anne
- NRHP reference No.: 79000930
- Added to NRHP: June 18, 1979

The O.P. Wickham House is a historic building located in Council Bluffs, Iowa, United States. Brothers Owen and James Wickham were born in Ireland, and settled in Council Bluffs in the 1860s. They were brick and stonemasons by trade, and they established a contracting firm with another partner in 1863. By 1865 the brothers were alone in the partnership, and it was a prominent construction firm into the 1930s. This 2½-story brick Queen Anne was Owen's second house after the Wickham-De Vol House. Its distinctive features include the jerkihhead gable ends with unusual double curving profiles, and the woodwork on the front porches with their fan-like brackets and the syncopated spacing of the frieze blocks. The house was listed on the National Register of Historic Places in 1979.
