= Lysander Tulleys House =

Historic house in Iowa, United States

- U.S. National Register of Historic Places
- U.S. Historic district – Contributing property
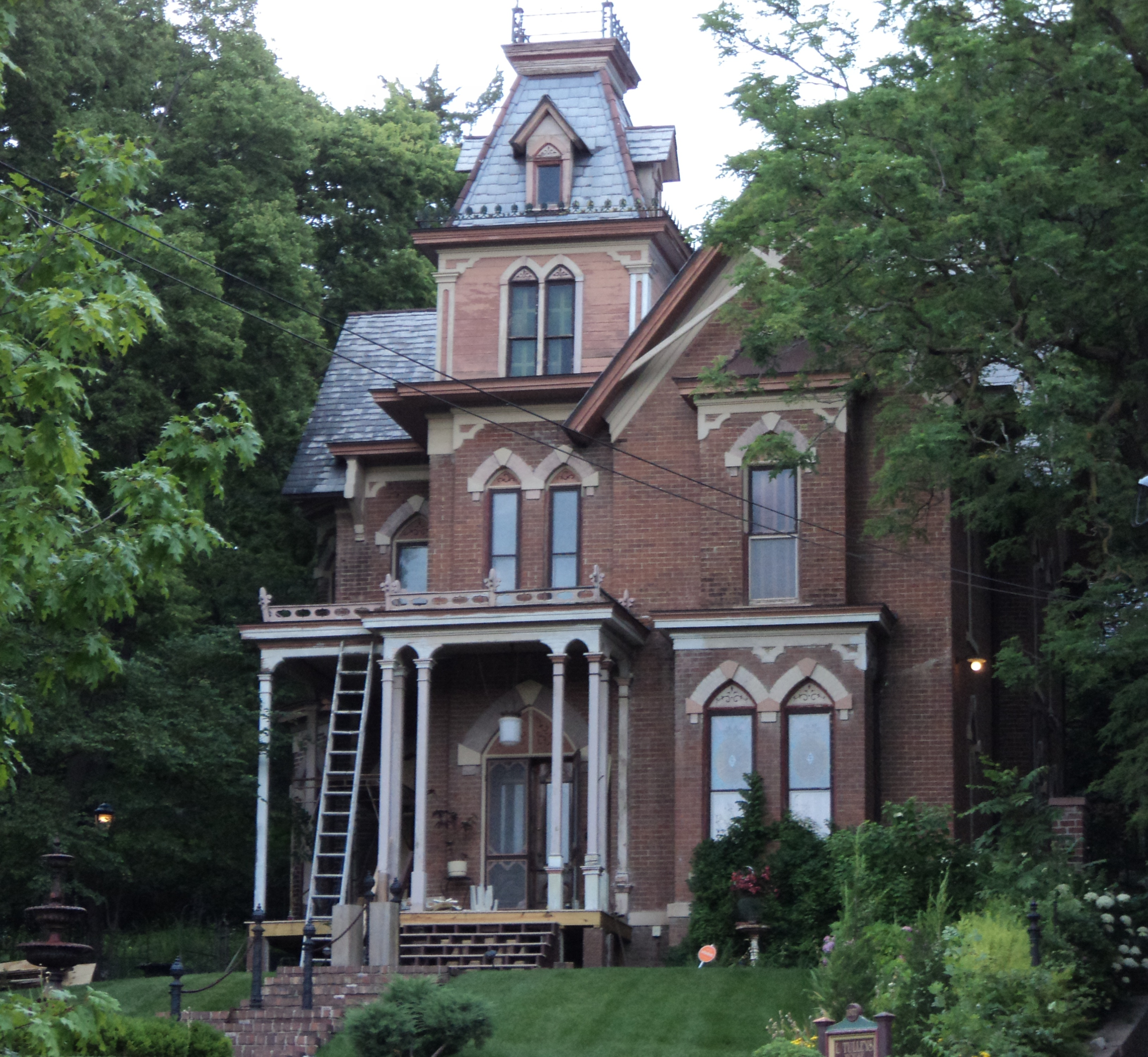

- Location within Iowa Location within the United States
- Location: 151 Park Ave. Council Bluffs, Iowa
- Coordinates: 41°15′37.8″N 95°50′38.7″W
- Area: less than one acre
- Built: 1877
- Built by: Wickham Bros.
- Architect: P.E. Hale
- Architectural style: Late Victorian
- Part of: Park/Glen Avenues Historic District (ID10000160)
- NRHP reference No.: 79000929
- Added to NRHP: October 18, 1979

The Lysander Tulleys House is a historic building located in Council Bluffs, Iowa, United States. Born in Ohio, Tulleys was a school teacher and served in the Civil War before settling in Council Bluffs where he was a partner in Burnham-Tulleys, which provided agricultural loans. In the 1890s they expanded their partnership and entered into real estate, which helped them survive the decade's economic downturn. This 2½-story brick Victorian house was designed by Chicago architect P.E. Hale, and built by Wickham Brothers, a local contractor. The focal point is a three-story square tower capped by a mansard roof with dormers. Its first two stories are brick and the third story is wood with corner pilasters. The friezes above the windows of the main facade are concrete. The other decorative elements are rather simple and include plain cornices and relatively unadorned porches.

The house was individually listed on the National Register of Historic Places in 1979. In 2010 it was included as a contributing property in the Park/Glen Avenues Historic District.
