= Thomas E. Cavin House =

Historic house in Iowa, United States

- U.S. National Register of Historic Places
- U.S. Historic district – Contributing property
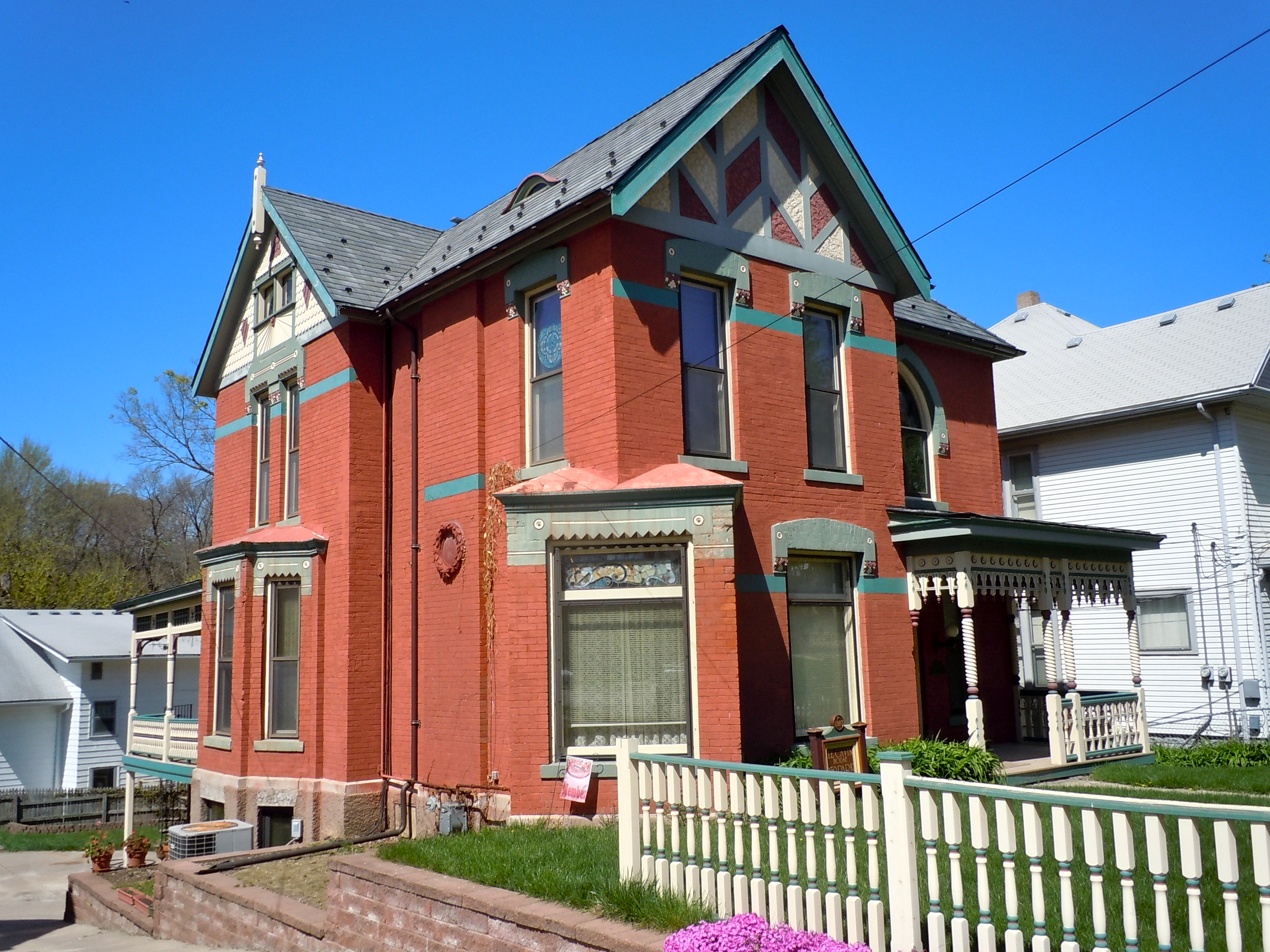

- Location within Iowa Location within the United States
- Location: 150 Park Ave., Council Bluffs, Iowa
- Coordinates: 41°15′36.8″N 95°50′41.5″W
- Area: less than one acre
- Built: 1887
- Architectural style: Colonial Revival; Gothic Revival; Queen Anne
- Part of: Park/Glen Avenues Historic District (ID10000160)
- NRHP reference No.: 84001306
- Added to NRHP: September 27, 1984

The Thomas E. Cavin House is a historic building located in Council Bluffs, Iowa.

== History ==
Built in 1887, it is an unusual and well-preserved brick example of an eclectic combination of Colonial Revival, Gothic Revival, and Queen Anne architectural elements. Cavin owned a dry goods store nearby. He lived here until he died in 1911, and the house remained in the family until 1919. At some point it had been converted into apartments. The house was damaged in a fire in 1934, and had to be partially rebuilt, especially the roof. The front porch is not original.

The house was individually listed on the National Register of Historic Places in 1984. In 2010 it was included as a contributing property in the Park/Glen Avenues Historic District.
