= YMCA Building (Council Bluffs, Iowa) =

- U.S. National Register of Historic Places
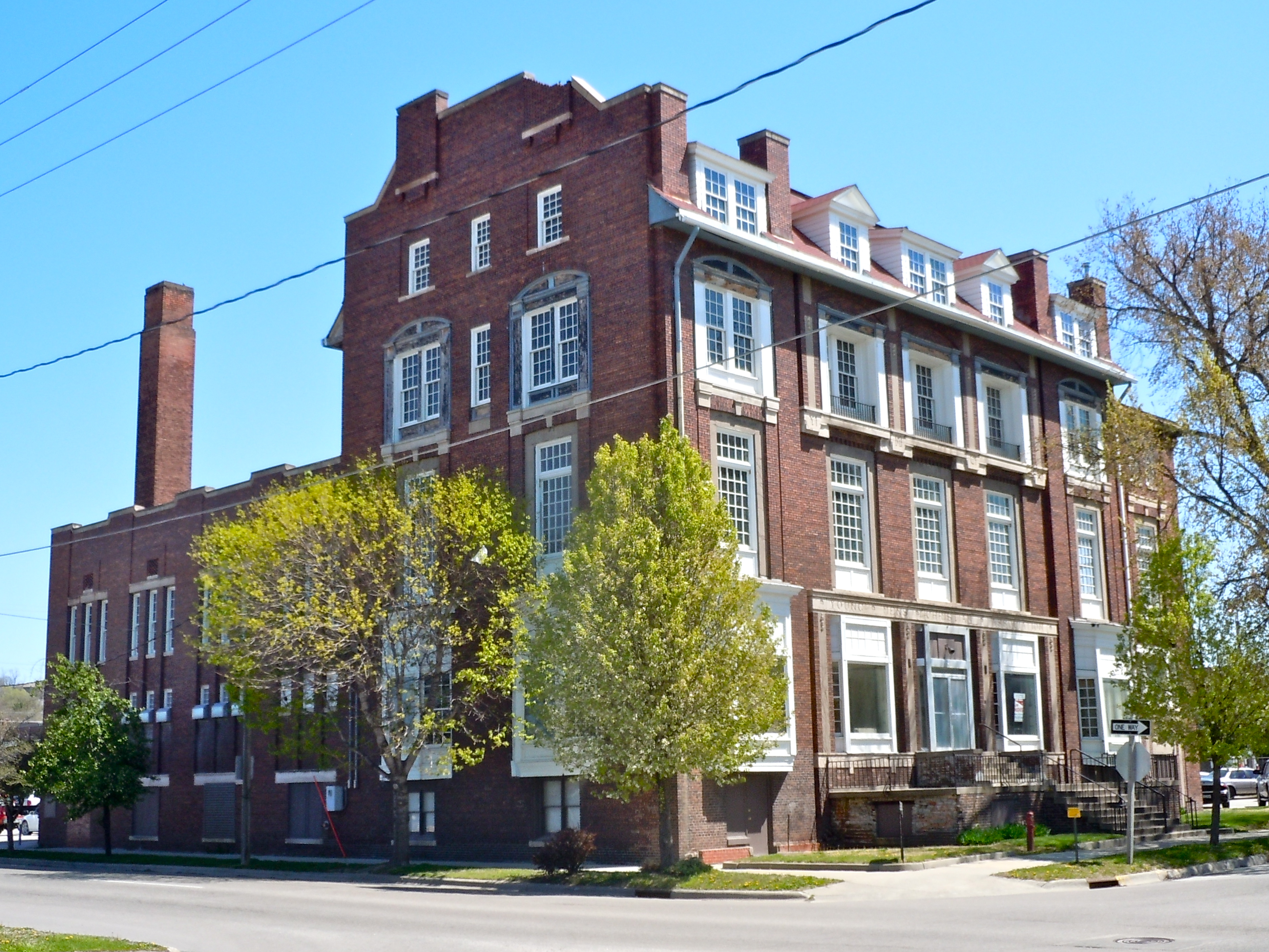

- Location within Iowa Location within the United States
- Location: 628 1st Ave. Council Bluffs, Iowa
- Coordinates: 41°15′37.5″N 95°51′13.3″W
- Built: 1909, 1931
- Architect: Frederic E. Cox (1909); J. Chris Jensen (1931)
- Architectural style: Colonial Revival
- NRHP reference No.: 79000931
- Added to NRHP: June 27, 1979

The YMCA Building was a historic building located in Council Bluffs, Iowa, United States. Construction of the building was partially funded by railroad magnate Grenville M. Dodge. The front section, designed by local architect Frederic E. Cox, was completed in 1909. The pool/gymnasium addition in the rear of the building was designed by J. Chris Jensen, another local architect, and completed in 1931. The front section is four stories tall and exhibits elements of the Colonial Revival and Federal styles. The fourth floor was renovated in 1931 and the shed dormers may have been added at that time. The rear addition is architecturally sympathetic to the original section of the building. The Union Pacific Railroad bought the building in 1929 so the facilities would be available for the men who worked on the railroad during the Great Depression. The local YMCA took over ownership again in 1955. The building was listed on the National Register of Historic Places in 1979.
