= B'nai Israel Synagogue (Council Bluffs, Iowa) =

Synagogue in Council Bluffs, IA

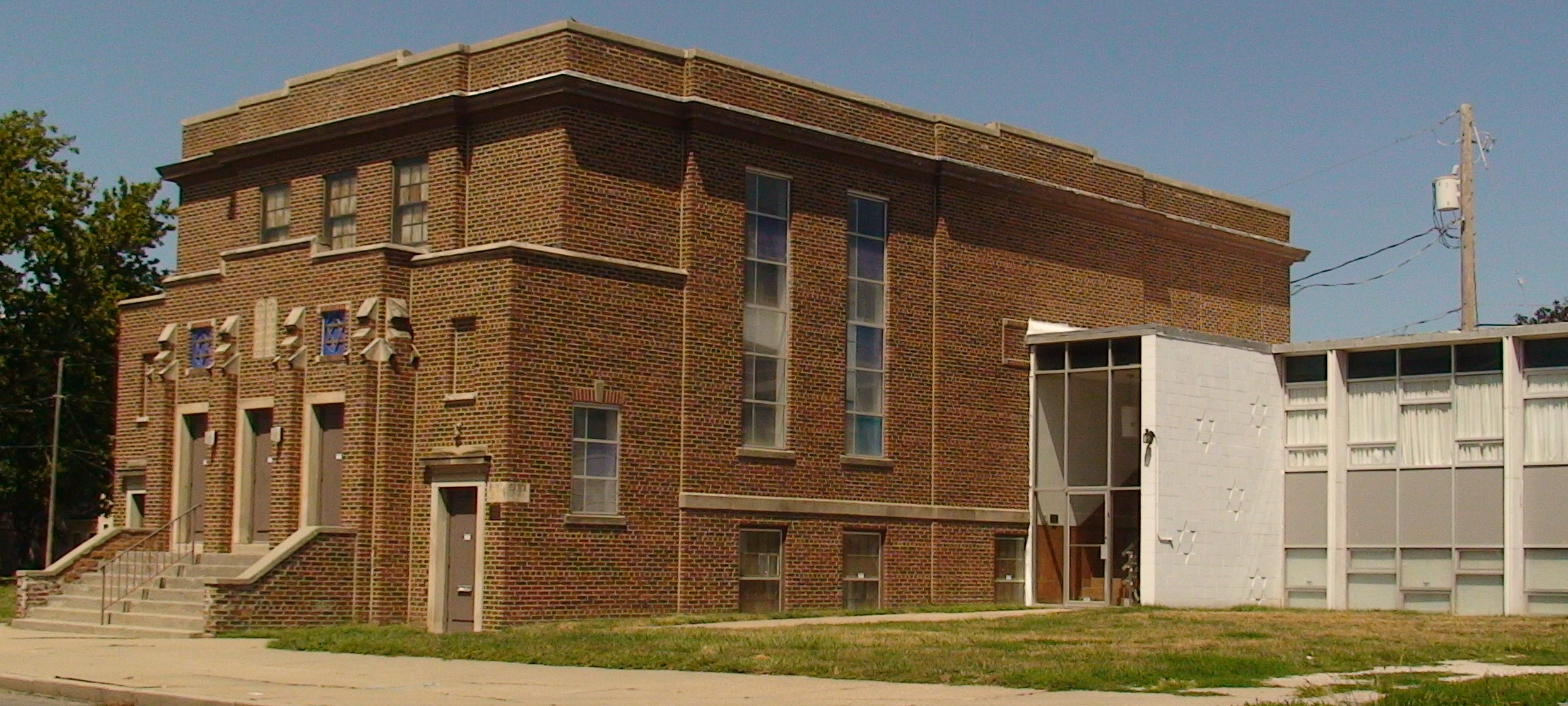
- B'nai Israel Synagogue, in 2012

- Location in Iowa

Religion
- Affiliation: Judaism
- Rite: Orthodox (1881–c. 1960s); Conservative (1960s–1989); Reconstructionist (1989–c. 2000s); Unaffiliated (since 2000s)
- Ecclesiastical or organizational status: Synagogue and museum
- Status: Active

Location
- Location: 618 Mynster Street, Council Bluffs, Iowa
- Country: United States
- Interactive map of B'nai Israel Synagogue
- Coordinates: 41°15′52″N 95°51′9″W

Architecture
- Architect: Jocheis Chris Jensen
- Type: Synagogue
- Style: Late 19th and early 20th century American Movements
- Completed: January 11, 1931
- Chevra B'nai Yisroel Synagogue
- U.S. National Register of Historic Places
- Area: less than 1 acre
- NRHP reference No.: 07000113
- Added to NRHP: March 7, 2007

B'nai Israel Synagogue is a synagogue in Council Bluffs, Iowa, United States. It is listed on the National Register of Historic Places by its original name Chevra B'nai Yisroel Synagogue in 2007.

== History ==
=== 19th century: Foundation of an Orthodox community ===
The first Jewish community in Council Bluffs was an Orthodox congregation in 1881 named Bikur Cholim. It had 25 charter members, without a rabbi or a building. They held services in rented facilities.

=== 1900–1949: Two synagogue buildings ===
Chevra B’nai Yisroel Congregation was organized in 1903 with 14 adult male members. They acquired the present property and built a frame synagogue the following year.

On March 5, 1930, the building was destroyed in a fire. Members from the congregation saved the Torah, sacred scrolls, and other religious items. A building committee was formed and plans were made for a new synagogue. Architect J. Chris Jensen was chosen to design the new building. The cornerstone from the former synagogue was recovered and was etched with an inscription for the new building. The new synagogue was completed on January 11, 1931. It seats 500 and was built for $26,000 (about $400,000 in 2020 values)

=== 1950–1999: Conservative then Reconstructionist Judaism ===
The rabbis in the 1950s and 1960s were Louis Leifer (1949–1953), David Korb (1953), J.A. Wachsmann, Jay Karzan (?–196?), Allen Kaiser, and Emil Klein (1967–1969). The congregation continued to grow and changed from Orthodox to Conservative Judaism. English was now used in services and men and women could now sit together. Previously the women and children sat in the balcony. The congregation officially changed its name to B'nai Israel in November 1953. An addition was designed by I.T. Carrithers in the early 1960s to add more space to the front and back of the older building. Only the back addition was built.

Soon after the addition was built the congregation began to decline in numbers. By 1980 plans were made to disband the congregation and sell the property. The membership, however, was determined to remain in place and recruited new members. In 1989 Rabbi Sharon Steifel became the first Reconstructionist rabbi at B'nai Israel. She was followed by Sheryl Shulewitz (1991–1994) and Ruth Ehrenstein (1994–?).

=== 21st century: Monthly services and nondenominational Judaism ===
In the 21st century, the synagogue no longer has a rabbi and is no longer affiliated with a movement. It holds one service per month, attended by local Jews and by members of other Omaha congregations. Many of these Omaha Jews who attend services or support operations previously moved away from the Council Bluffs area resulting in use and existence value derived from the continued operation of B'nai Israel.

== Architecture ==
The exterior of the synagogue is covered in polychrome, rough-cast brick. Classical entablature and galvanized iron cornice top the building. The building sits on a raised basement and the three doorways into the sanctuary are reached by a set of concrete steps. Inset panels of the Star of David and the tablets of the Ten Commandments inscribed in Hebrew are located above the doors. The interior is two stories tall with a balcony, which had been reduced in size during the 1960s renovation. The congregation has seven Torahs, two of which were saved in the 1930 fire. The Ark is composed of dark wood paneling and classical pilasters. Louvered doors lead to the cabinet where its scrolls are kept.
