= Shepard and Emma Farnsworth House =

Historic house in Iowa, United States

- U.S. National Register of Historic Places
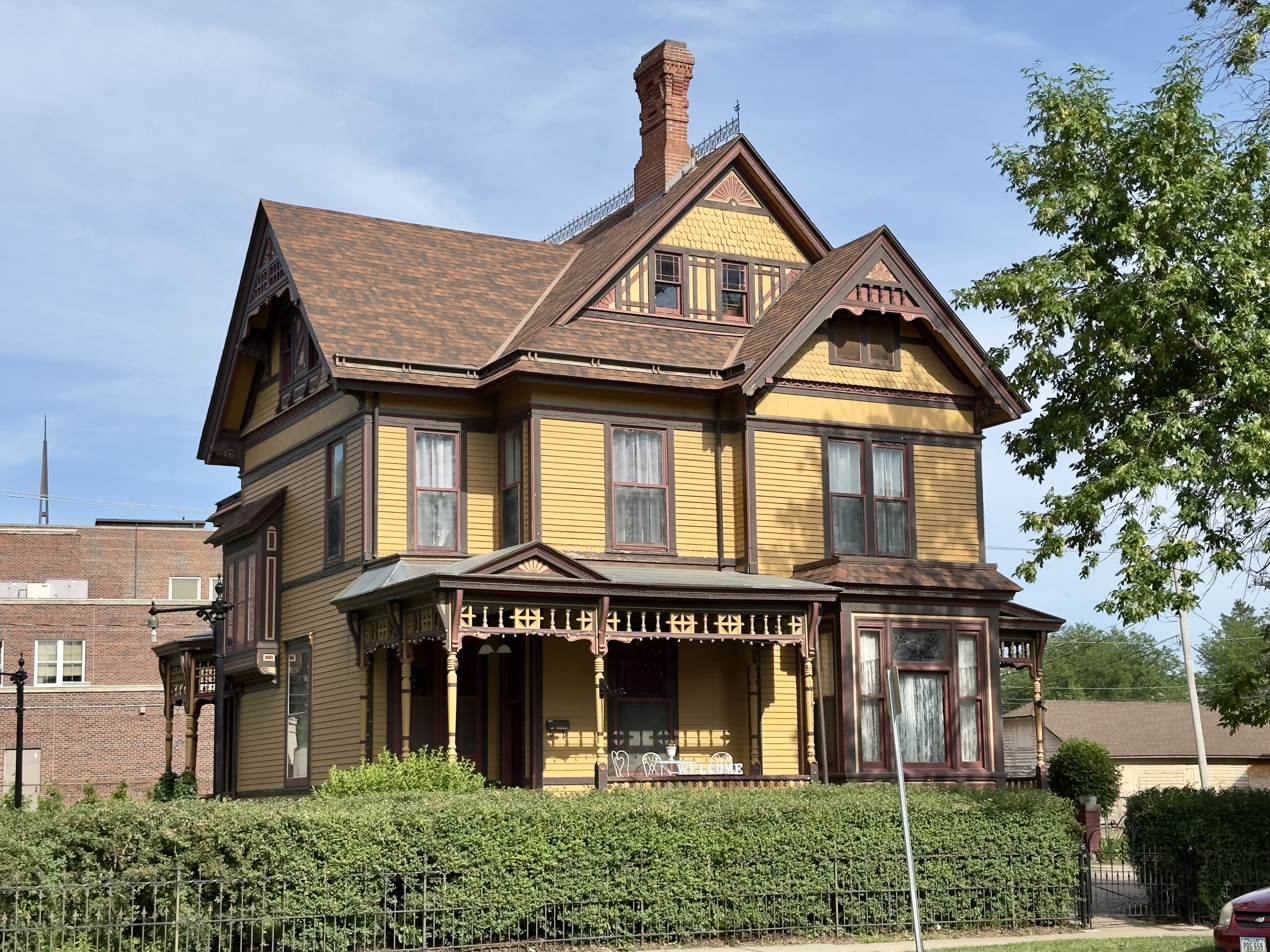
- the house in June 2025

- Location within Iowa Location within the United States
- Location: 301 S. 8th St. Council Bluffs, Iowa
- Coordinates: 41.25868846580392°N 95.85574054223243°W
- Area: less than one acre
- Built: 1886
- Built by: Vincent Battin
- Architect: S.E. Maxon
- Architectural style: Queen Anne
- NRHP reference No.: 100002621
- Added to NRHP: June 29, 2018

The Shepard and Emma Farnsworth House is a historic building located in Council Bluffs, Iowa, United States. Built by Vincent Battin in 1886, the two-story frame structure is an example of an asymmetrical Queen Anne style residence. It was designed by local architect Stiles Maxon, who was also responsible for numerous other houses in the city and three county courthouses in the state of Iowa. The house features multiple gables, the original wrought iron ornamentation on the crest of the roof, cast metal egg-and-dart trim under the eaves, three chimneys, and four porches with spindles and sawn wood cutouts. It also has stained glass, leaded glass, and etched glass windows and doors. It was listed on the National Register of Historic Places in 2018.

Shepard Farnsworth was a native of Muscatine, Iowa who began his banking career in Washington, Iowa before serving in the American Civil War, where he was under the command of his future father-in-law. After establishing a private bank in McGregor, Iowa with his brother, Farnsworth settled in Council Bluffs in 1869. He purchased a half interest in the stock of the First National Bank and worked there as the cashier until he retired in 1892. He married Emma Crabbe in Washington, and they raised five children. Farnsworth died in 1902, and Emma continued to reside in the house until 1920 when she sold the house to Judge John P. Tinley.
