= Hughes-Irons Motor Company =

- U.S. National Register of Historic Places
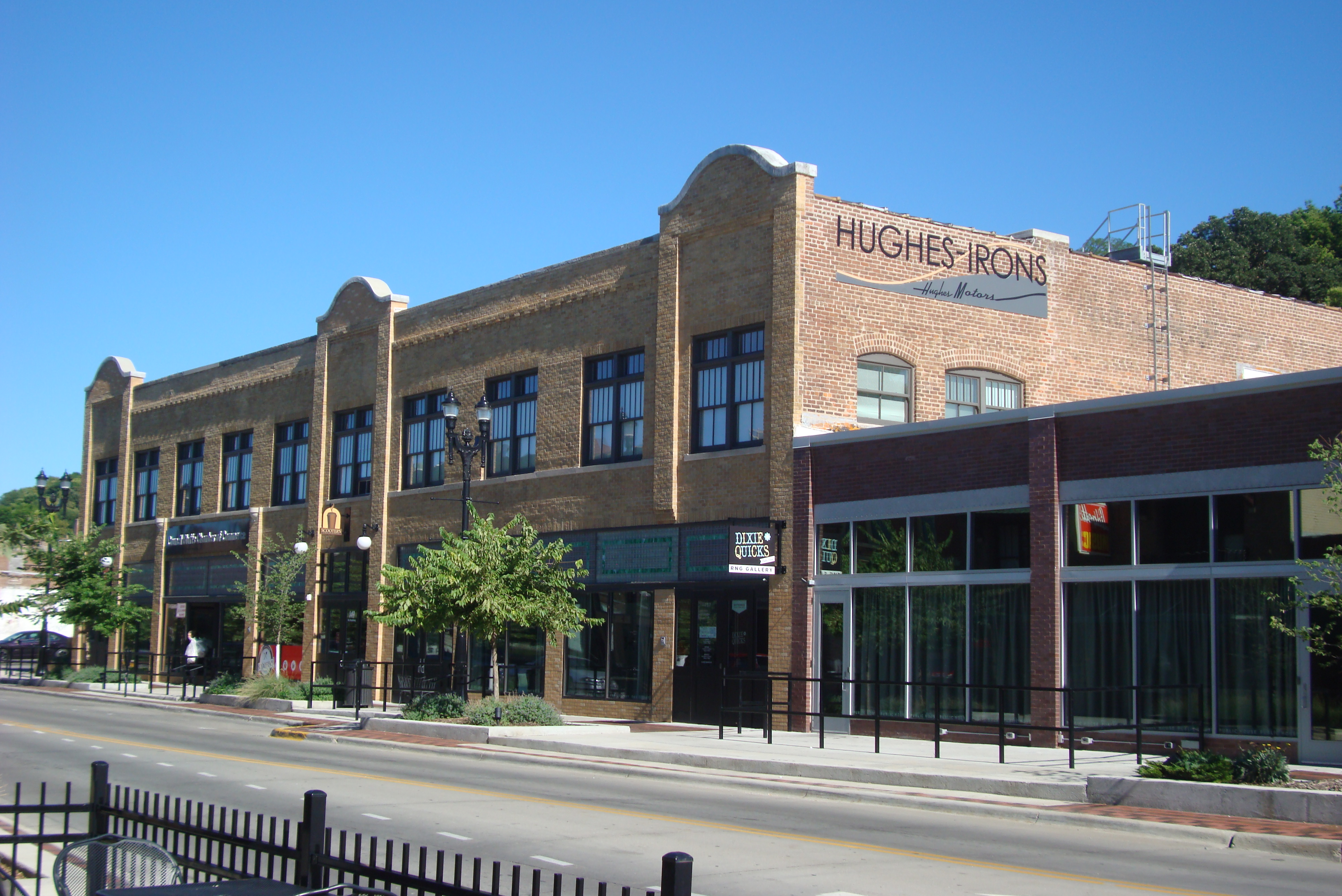

- Location within Iowa Location within the United States
- Location: 149-161 W. Broadway; Council Bluffs, Iowa
- Coordinates: 41°15′43.8″N 95°50′42.3″W
- Built: 1917, 1923
- Architect: J. Chris Jensen
- Architectural style: Mission Revival
- NRHP reference No.: 11000392
- Added to NRHP: June 23, 2011

The Hughes-Irons Motor Company is a historic building located in Council Bluffs, Iowa, United States. Floyd Hughes and George Irons established an automobile sales and service business selling Ford cars and tractors. They built the eastern six bay section of this building in 1917. The two-story brick structure exhibits elements of the Mission Revival style. Irons left the partnership three years later and was replaced by Parmer. Hughes-Parmer added the four western bays in 1923, before the business split into two different companies. Parmer maintained the Ford dealership in the original building and Hughes opened a Chevrolet dealership in the addition. Parmer was replaced by the Atlantic Auto Company in 1930. They were the first in a long line of automobile repair shops and dealerships that occupied the original section of the building. Hughes remained in the addition until 1979, although they expanded into the neighboring building to the west in 1944. Restoration of the building began in 2008, reversing the alterations done to its main facade. The local chamber of commerce occupies the main floor, and the second floor was converted into apartments. J. Chris Jensen was the architect, and the building was listed on the National Register of Historic Places in 2011.
