= Sandwich–Marseilles Manufacturing Building =

- U.S. National Register of Historic Places
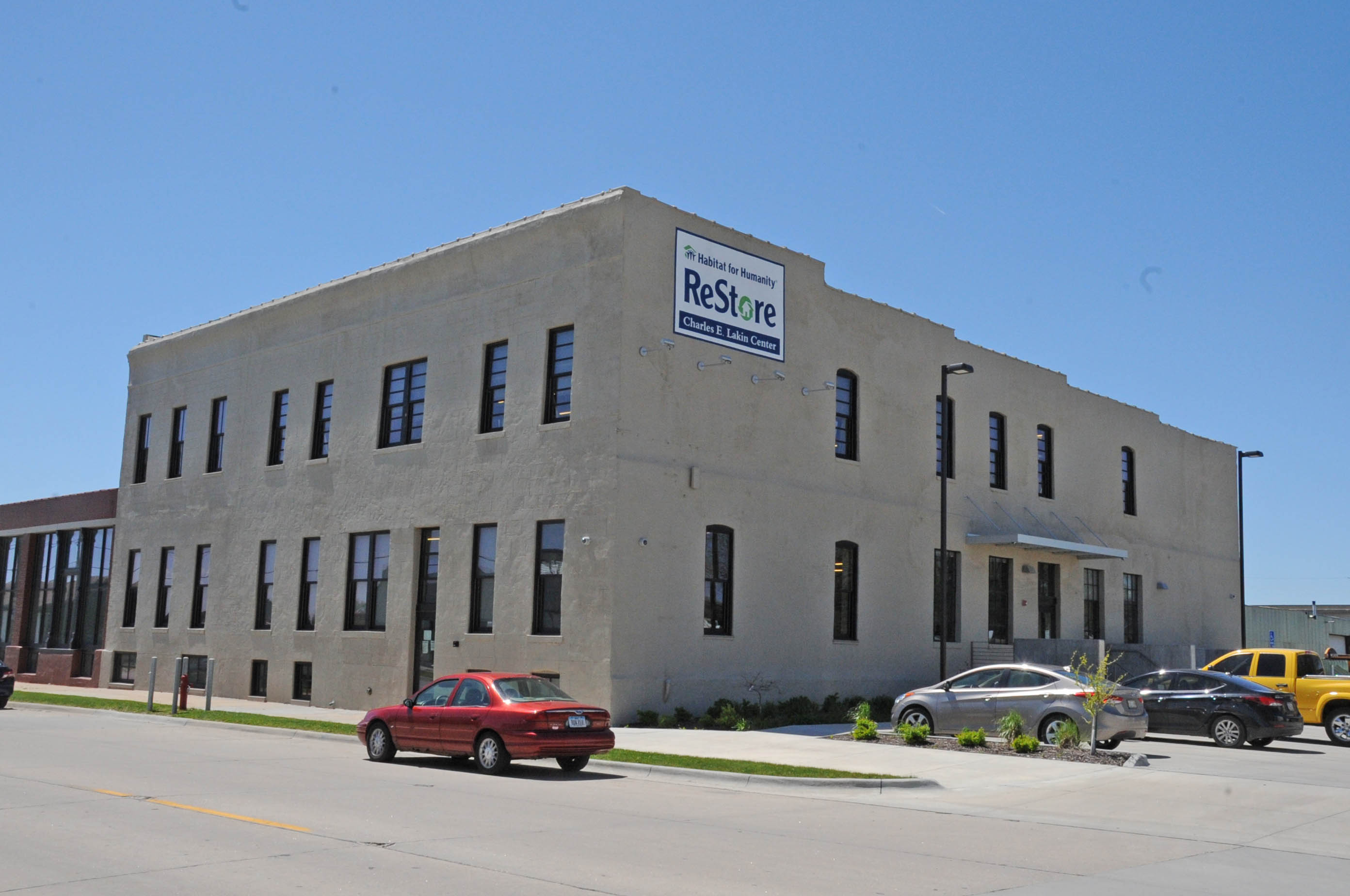

- Location within Iowa Location within the United States
- Location: 1216–1230 S. Main St. Council Bluffs, Iowa
- Coordinates: 41°14′59.4″N 95°51′07.1″W
- Built: 1883, 1927
- Architectural style: Late 19th & 20th Century American Movement
- NRHP reference No.: 14000253
- Added to NRHP: May 27, 2014

The Sandwich–Marseilles Manufacturing Building, also known as the Dwarfies/Breeders Supply Building, is a historic building located in Council Bluffs, Iowa, United States. This building was built by the Sandwich Manufacturing Company and the Marseilles Manufacturing Company in what is known as the Implement District, an industrial area south of the central business district that was home to farm implement manufacturers. The two-story section on the north side was completed in 1883, and the single-story addition on the south side was completed sometime between 1889 and 1891. Marseilles then occupied the addition while Sandwich remained in the original building. There was a shift from agricultural implements to food processing as the area's business interests began to diversify. Dwarfies Corporation, a cereal manufacturer, took over the building in 1929. It is the only remaining building left in the city to illustrate this shift. The building was damaged in a fire in 1947. Dwarfies rebuilt this building and then built a new factory in 1949 along U.S. Route 6. Breeders Supply Company, an international mail order business for breeding supplies, moved into this building the following year. They used it as a warehouse for ten years. The building was listed on the National Register of Historic Places in 2014.
