= Carstens Farmstead =

- U.S. National Register of Historic Places
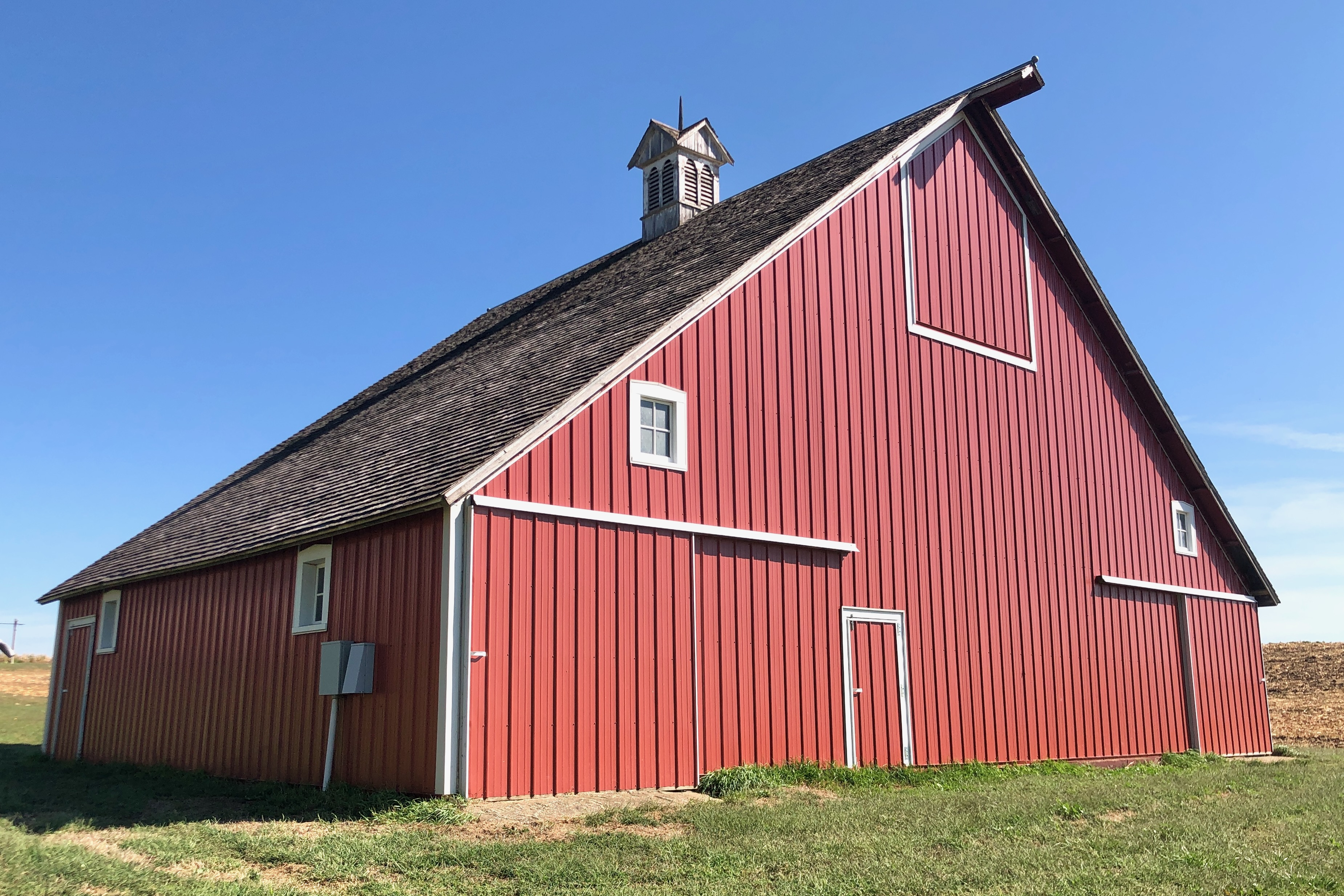
- Beef Cattle Barn in 2025

- Location within Iowa Location within the United States
- Location: South of Shelby on Iowa Highway 168
- Coordinates: 41°28′57″N 95°27′22″W
- Area: 80 acres (32 ha)
- NRHP reference No.: 79000932
- Added to NRHP: July 10, 1979

The Carstens Farmstead is a collection of historic buildings located south of Shelby, Iowa, United States. Johan Carstens was a German immigrant who spent eight years living and working in Milwaukee, Chicago, and Davenport, Iowa before settling in Pottawattamie County in 1871, where he established this farm. He bought 160 acres (65 ha) of land from the Chicago, Rock Island and Pacific Railroad, and continued to farm it until he and his wife retired in 1905. The farm remained in the Carstens family until 1977, when the last of the 80 acres (32 ha) was donated to the Pottawattamie County Historical Society. The farm buildings include: the original farmhouse (1872), the 1888 farmhouse with the summer kitchen, an outhouse, garage (1917), granary (1898), horse and dairy barn (1886), beef cattle barn (1903), beef cattle barn (1917), forge and workshop (1910, with additions), windmill (1916), feed shed (1919), hog house (1919), poultry house, machine shed (1920), the cob house (1926), and a corn crib (1930). The buildings were listed together on the National Register of Historic Places in 1979.
