= Bennett Building (Council Bluffs, Iowa) =

- U.S. National Register of Historic Places
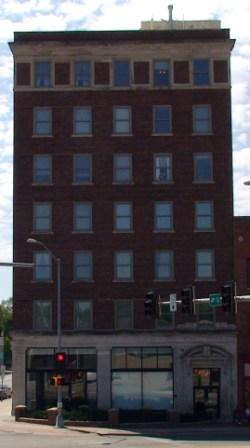
- View from the north of the front of Bennett Building

- Location within Iowa Location within the United States
- Location: 405 West Broadway; Council Bluffs, Iowa
- Coordinates: 41°15′38″N 95°50′56.5″W
- Built: 1923-1924
- Built by: E. A. Wickham and Co.
- Architect: Jensen and Larson; McDonald and McDonald
- Architectural style: Early Commercial
- NRHP reference No.: 01000861
- Added to NRHP: August 8, 2001

The Bennett Building, also known as the Ervin Building, is a historic building located in downtown Council Bluffs, Iowa, United States. The previous building to occupy this property was a Woolworth's that was destroyed in a fire in 1922. The Bennett Building Corporation was formed in 1923 to build an office building that was designed to attract medical professionals. The seven-story, brick, Early Commercial structure was designed by local architectural firm Jensen and Larson, and the Omaha firm of McDonald and McDonald served as the supervising architects. E. A. Wickham and Company of Council Bluffs was the contractor.

The building is 86 feet (26 m) tall, and it was historically the tallest building in downtown Council Bluffs. It follows a rectangular plan in the basement and first floor, and from the second to the seventh floor it follows an L-shaped plan. The exterior features a tripartite division. The first floor is a limestone base that houses storefronts and the entrance lobby for the offices above. Floors two through six are composed of brick with large, regularly spaced windows. They contained professional offices, with many of them occupied by physicians and dentists. Many of Council Bluffs' women doctors had their practices here. The top floor is a modest brick and limestone crown that also housed offices.

The Bennett Building has been converted into an apartment building. It was listed on the National Register of Historic Places in 2001.
