= Reverend Little's Young Ladies Seminary =

- U.S. National Register of Historic Places
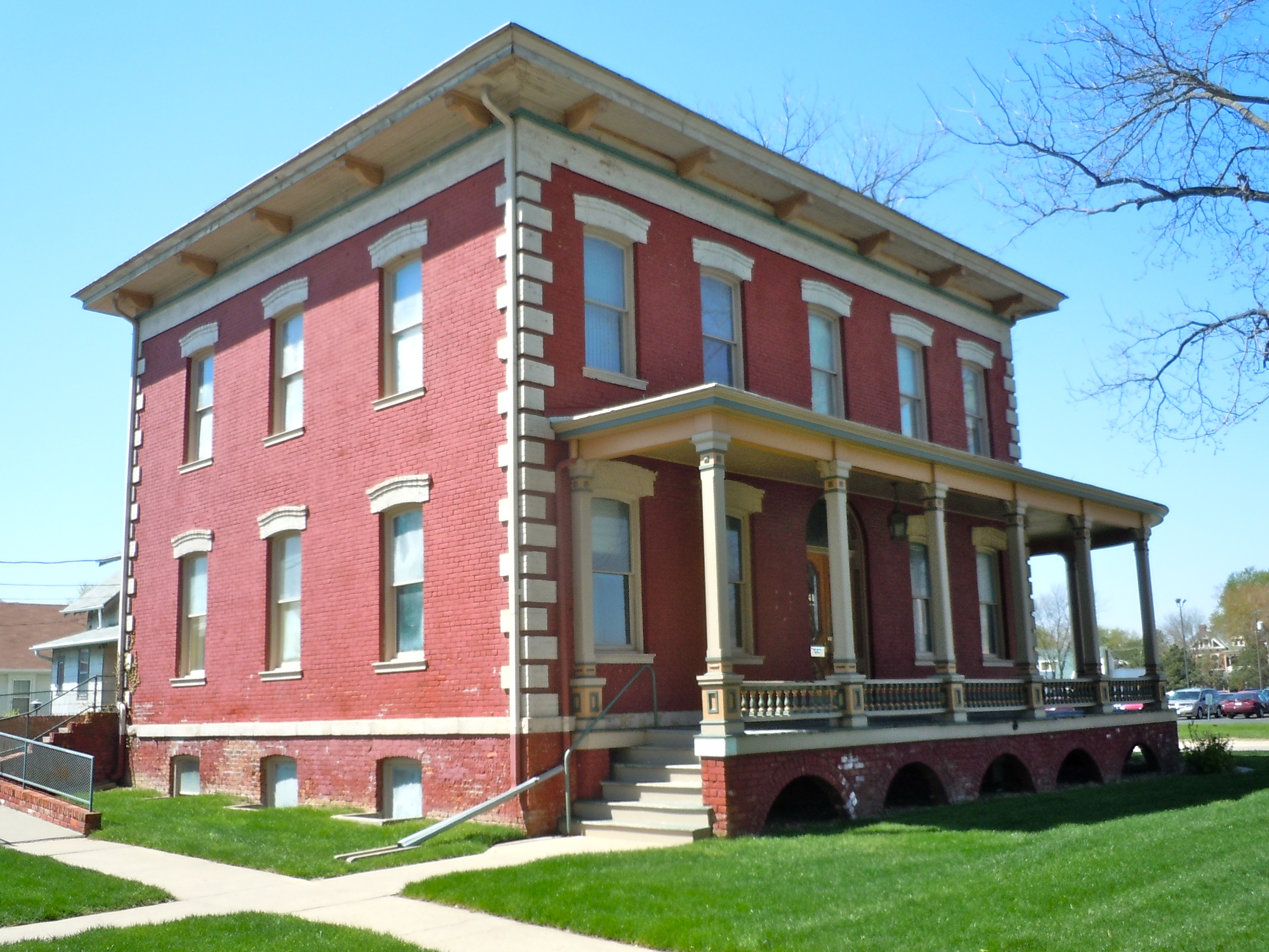

- Location within Iowa Location within the United States
- Location: 541 6th Ave. Council Bluffs, Iowa
- Coordinates: 41°15′22″N 95°51′8″W
- Area: less than one acre
- Built: 1867
- Built by: Bassett, A.G.; Williams & Tostevin Co.
- Architectural style: Italianate
- NRHP reference No.: 82002637
- Added to NRHP: February 4, 1982

Reverend Little's Young Ladies Seminary is a historic seminary building at 541 6th Avenue in Council Bluffs, Iowa.

The Italianate style building was constructed in 1867 as a school for women, which was founded by a Presbyterian minister, George Little. Unfortunately, "[a]lthough the Rev. Little’s school received very favorable publicity, he encountered great difficulty in collecting the money pledged to construct his building. On Jan. 1, 1870, his board of trustees informed him that no more payments would be forthcoming. The Rev. Little closed the school, filed suit against the trustees for the money due him and eventually was awarded title to the property. He sold the building and moved to Nebraska where he became a missionary." Several prominent businessmen later owned the building, and in the early 1900s it was converted to apartments. The building was added to the National Register of Historic Places in 1982. It currently houses a law office.
