= State Savings Bank (Council Bluffs, Iowa) =

- U.S. National Register of Historic Places
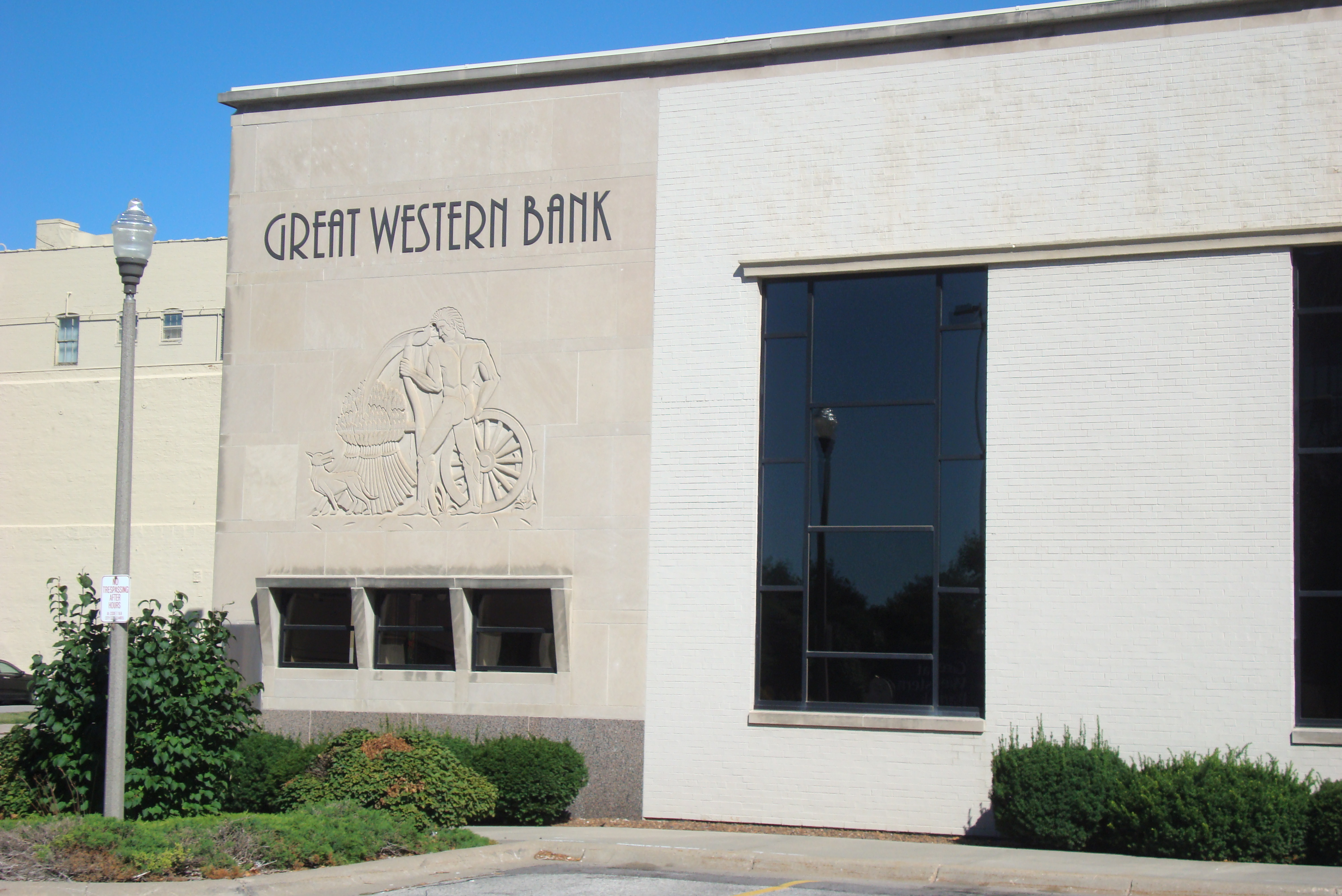

- Location within Iowa Location within the United States
- Location: 509 W. Broadway; Council Bluffs, Iowa
- Coordinates: 41°15′39″N 95°51′02″W
- Area: less than one acre
- Built: 1946-1947
- Built by: Bank Building & Equipment Corp.
- Architect: W.G. Knoebel
- Architectural style: Art Deco
- NRHP reference No.: 84001312
- Added to NRHP: June 4, 1984

State Savings Bank, also known as the Old Savings Bank, is a historic building located in Council Bluffs, Iowa, United States. the bank was established in 1889, and was originally located across the street. Planning for this building began in 1941 with the organization of the State Investment Company, which would build and own the building. It was designed by W.G. Knoebel and built by St. Louis–based Bank Building and Equipment Corporation of America. It is a late example of Art Deco, and it's the only building in Council Bluffs that exhibits this style. Two-thirds of the building is a single-story banking facility, and the rest is divided into two-stories of office space. It has one of the first drive-through teller windows in Iowa. The rectangular building's exterior is finished in gray limestone on two elevations, and a wrap-around continuation on a third. Its primary decorative feature is an inscribed harvest motif on the east and west elevations that are mirror images of each other, oriented to the north. The motif features a male nude holding a wagon wheel and a scythe, with sheaves of wheat and a dog.

The bank changed its name to State Bank & Trust in 1967, and continued to operated from here until 1978. The building sat empty for five years when it was renovated for use by State Investment Company and other offices. It was listed on the National Register of Historic Places in 1984. The building now houses a branch office of First Interstate BancSystem.
