= Lincoln–Fairview Historic District =

Historic district in Iowa, United States

- U.S. National Register of Historic Places
- U.S. Historic district
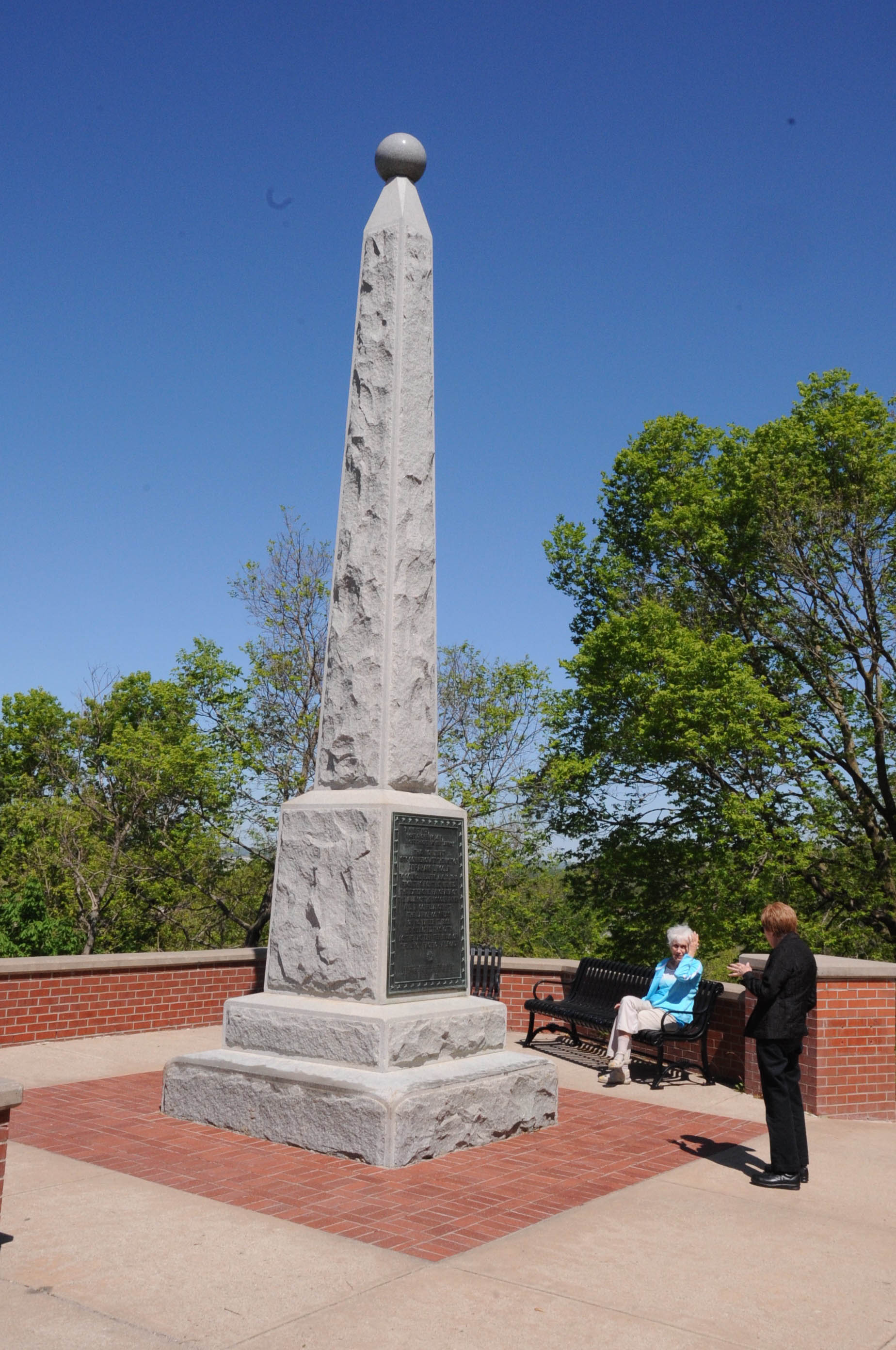
- Lincoln Monument (1911)

- Location within Iowa Location within the United States
- Location: Roughly bounded by W. Kanesville Boulevard, Oakland Ave., Fairview Cemetery, and N. 1st St., Council Bluffs, Iowa
- Coordinates: 41°15′58.4″N 95°50′51.5″W
- Area: 88 acres (36 ha)
- Architectural style: Late 19th and 20th Century Revivals; Late 19th and Early 20th Century American Movements
- NRHP reference No.: 07000281
- Added to NRHP: April 10, 2007

The Lincoln–Fairview Historic District is a nationally recognized historic district located in Council Bluffs, Iowa, United States. It was listed on the National Register of Historic Places in 2007. At the time of its nomination the district consisted of 327 resources, including 264 contributing buildings, two contributing sites, four contributing structures, three contributing objects, 52 non-contributing buildings, and two non-contributing structures. The district is primarily a residential area north of the central business district. It includes the steep loess bluff where President Abraham Lincoln stood to survey the area when he was deciding on the eastern terminus of the Union Pacific Railroad. The Daughters of the American Revolution erected a monument at the location in 1911.

The neighborhood generally developed between 1846, when Fairview Cemetery was established, and 1956. However, it was largely developed by 1940. The houses that populate the district were built in the revival styles and architectural movements that were popular during this time period. Some of the houses were built on the steep slope of the bluff. In addition to residential architecture, there are two churches and the city's water works that are contributing properties: St. Mary and St. George Coptic Orthodox Church (c. 1925), the Council Bluffs Waterworks (reservoir, 1941 Works Progress Administration; pump house, 1947), and the Community of Christ Church (1951). The Ruth Anne Dodge Memorial (1918), which was individually listed on the National Register of Historic Places, is also a contributing property.
