= German Bank Building of Walnut, Iowa =

- U.S. National Register of Historic Places
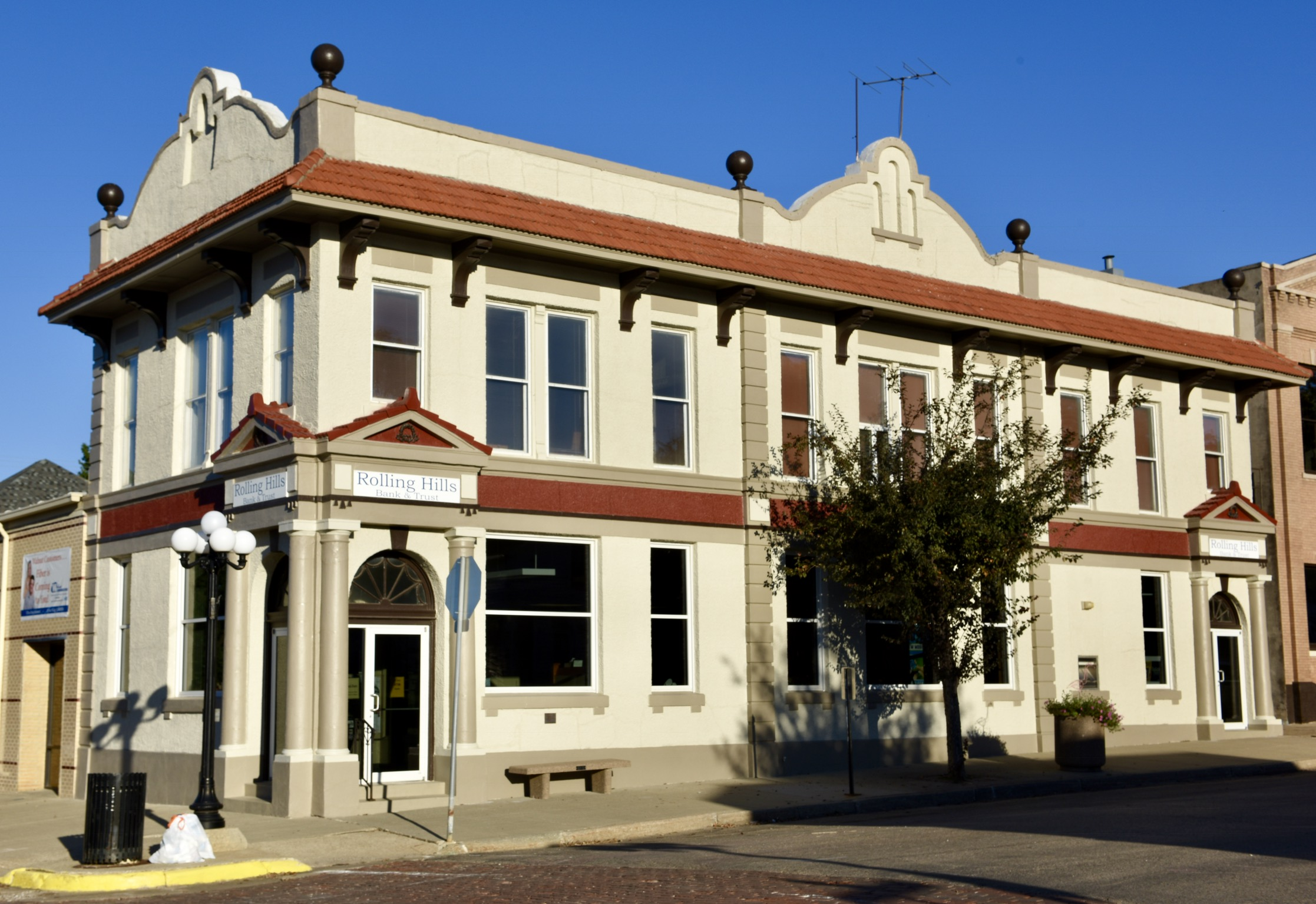

- Location within Iowa Location within the United States
- Location: Junction of Highland and Central Sts. Walnut, Iowa
- Coordinates: 41°28′39″N 95°13′20.4″W
- Area: less than one acre
- Built: 1884, 1916
- Architect: St. Louis Bank Equipment Co.
- Architectural style: Classical Revival; Mission/Spanish Revival
- NRHP reference No.: 91000536
- Added to NRHP: May 1, 1991

German Bank Building of Walnut, Iowa, also known as the Walnut State Bank Building, is a historic building located in Walnut, Iowa, United States. A two-story, brick building was completed on this corner in 1884. It housed a blacksmith shop and a land and loan business (a private bank) by 1887. The German Savings bank was organized in 1893, and used this building for a short time before it folded the following year. It was reorganized and re-opened in 1898. They renovated the building to its present exterior in the Mission Revival style in 1916, and the interior in 1920. The interior renovation was done by the St. Louis Bank Equipment Company. The Walnut Telephone Company began as a tenant on the second floor in 1919. While German immigrants remained in control, the bank's name was changed to American State Bank in 1920 because of anti-German sentiment following World War I. It was reorganized in 1923 as the Walnut State Bank. It was listed on the National Register of Historic Places in 1991.
