= McCormick Harvesting Machine Company Building =

- U.S. National Register of Historic Places
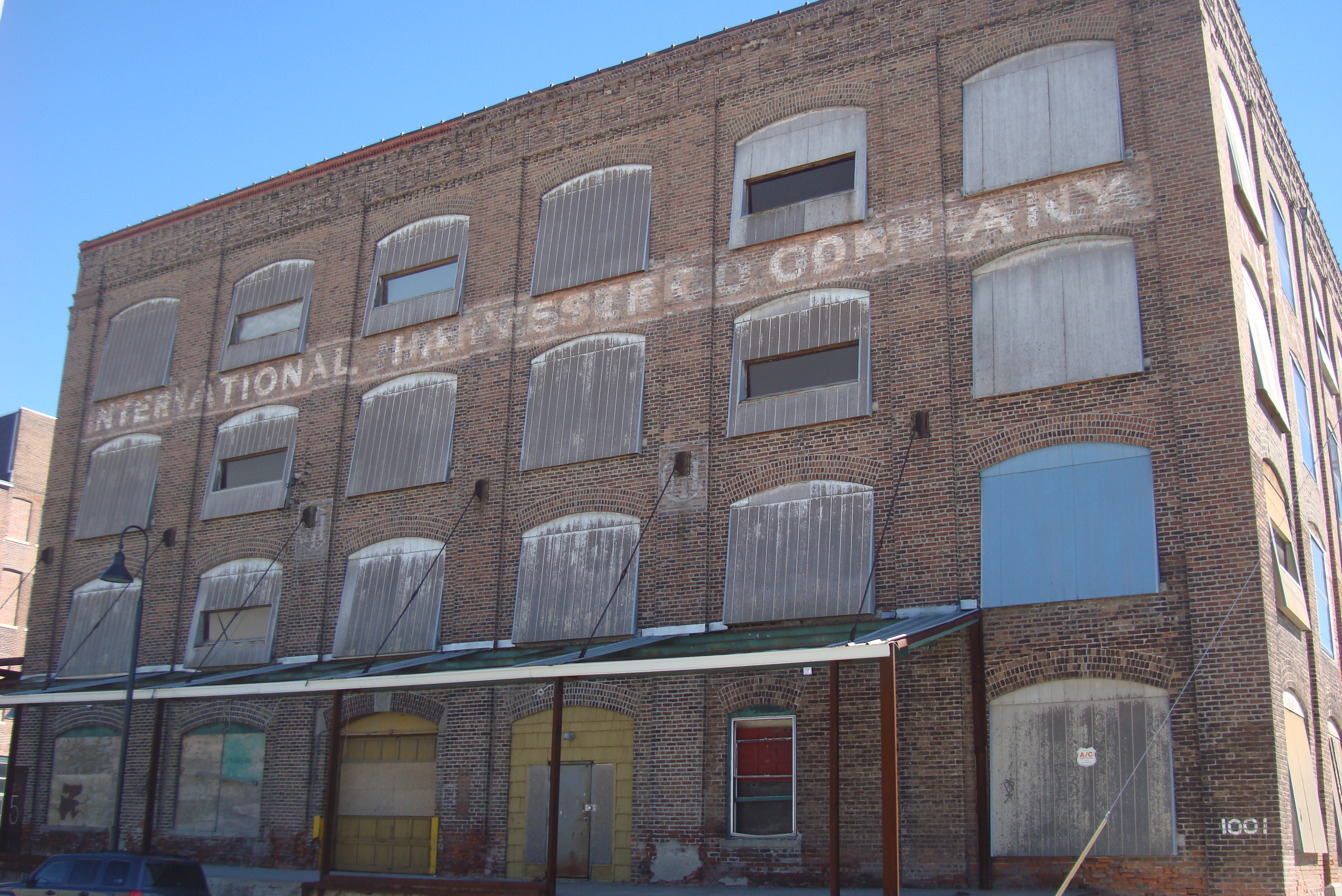

- Location within Iowa Location within the United States
- Location: 1001 S. 6th St. Council Bluffs, Iowa
- Coordinates: 41°15′07.8″N 95°51′09.7″W
- Area: less than one acre
- Built: 1894
- Architectural style: Late 19th and Early 20th Century American Movements
- NRHP reference No.: 12000780
- Added to NRHP: September 10, 2012

The McCormick Harvesting Machine Company Building, also known as the International Harvester Transfer House, is an historic building located in Council Bluffs, Iowa, United States. The first railroad arrived in the city in 1867, and by 1898 there were 11 truck line railroads that terminated here. That made Council Bluffs an excellent place for the transfer and distribution of goods. Chicago based McCormick Harvesting Machine Company had this four-story brick structure built in 1894 as one of their branch houses. Those facilities acted as a dealership for the company's products. In the 1902 McCormick and four other companies merged to form International Harvester (IH). By 1922, this building became one of IH's four domestic transfer house facilities. Those facilities received large stocks of the company's products by train and distributed them to the branch houses. IH continued to use this building until 1964. It was listed on the National Register of Historic Places in 2012.
