= Charles Henry and Charlotte Norton House =

Historic house in Iowa, United States

- U.S. National Register of Historic Places
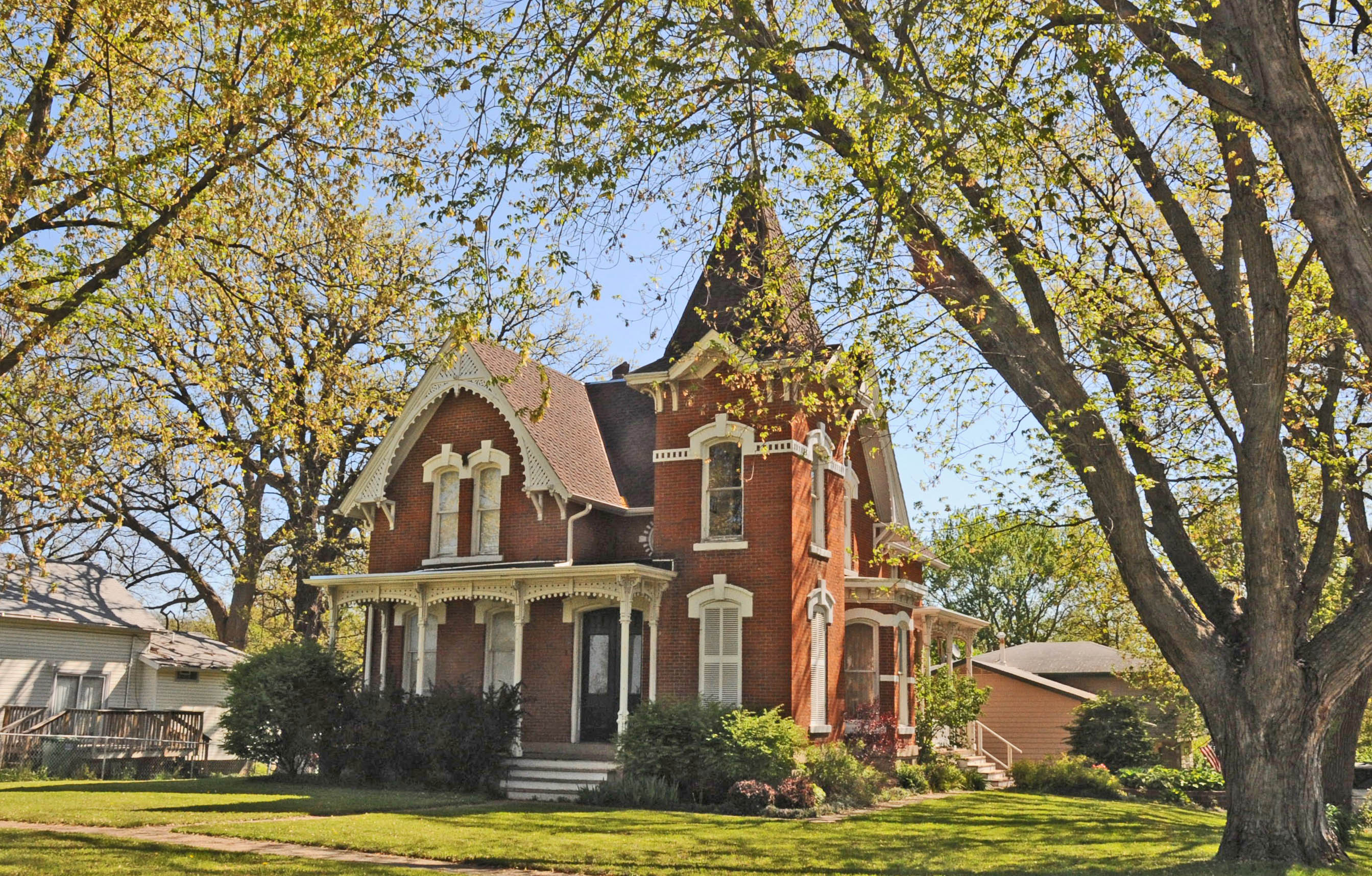

- Location within Iowa Location within the United States
- Location: 401 N. Chestnut St. Avoca, Iowa
- Coordinates: 41°28′46.9″N 95°20′10″W
- Area: less than one acre
- Built: 1878
- Architectural style: Italianate; Gothic Revival
- NRHP reference No.: 04001401
- Added to NRHP: December 30, 2004

The Charles Henry and Charlotte Norton House is a historic building located in Avoca, Iowa, United States. Born in New York and raised in Cass County, Iowa, Norton settled in 1869 at a railroad stop that would become Avoca. He opened a general store that would grow to include hardware and then buggies, wagons, and harnesses. This two-story brick Italianate house with Gothic Revival influences was completed in 1878. Its Italianate features include a two-story stairwell tower, window and door hoods, double front doors, tall arched windows with a round window to the left of the tower, and a single story bay behind the tower. The Gothic Revival style is realized primarily in the ornate vergeboards and the steep pitch of the gables. The house was listed on the National Register of Historic Places in 2004.
