= Merritt B. Curtis =

United States Marine Corps general

Merritt Barton Curtis
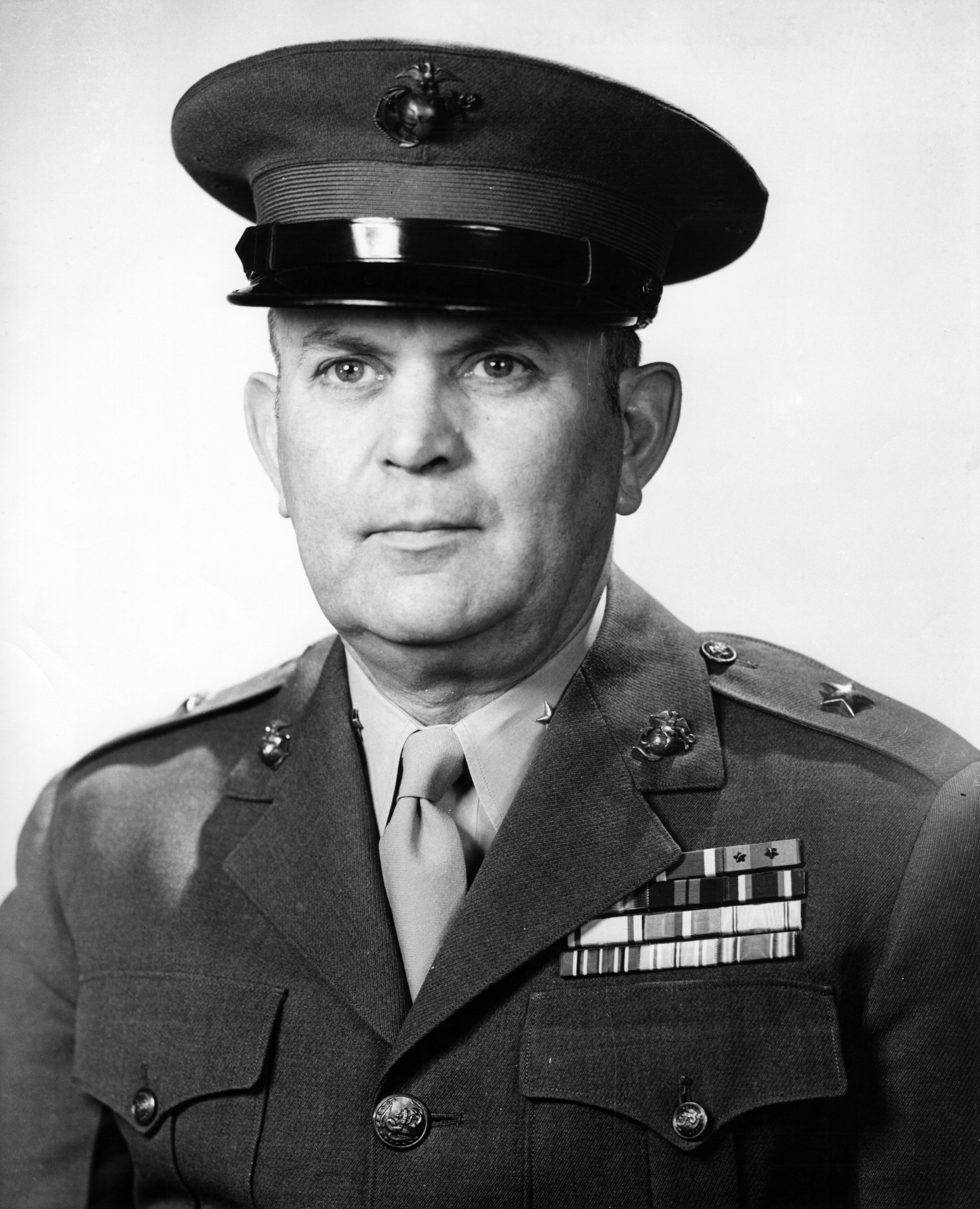
- Merritt B. Curtis as Brigadier General, USMC
- Born: August 31, 1892; San Bernardino, California, U.S.
- Died: May 16, 1966 (aged 73); Washington, D.C., U.S.
- Burial place: Arlington National Cemetery
- Military career
- Allegiance: United States of America
- Branch: United States Marine Corps
- Service years: 1917–1949
- Rank: Brigadier general
- Commands: Paymaster, FMF Pacific
- Conflicts: World War I Haitian Campaign; Yangtze Patrol; World War II
- Awards: Navy Commendation Medal

Merritt Barton Curtis, (August 31, 1892 – May 16, 1966) was a United States Marine Corps officer with the rank of brigadier general during World War II. He was also a lawyer who in 1960 ran for President of the United States in Washington with B. N. Miller and vice-president in Texas with Charles L. Sullivan under the Constitution Party banner. Curtis also ran for vice-president in Michigan with Lar Daly under the Tax Cut banner.

== Early career ==
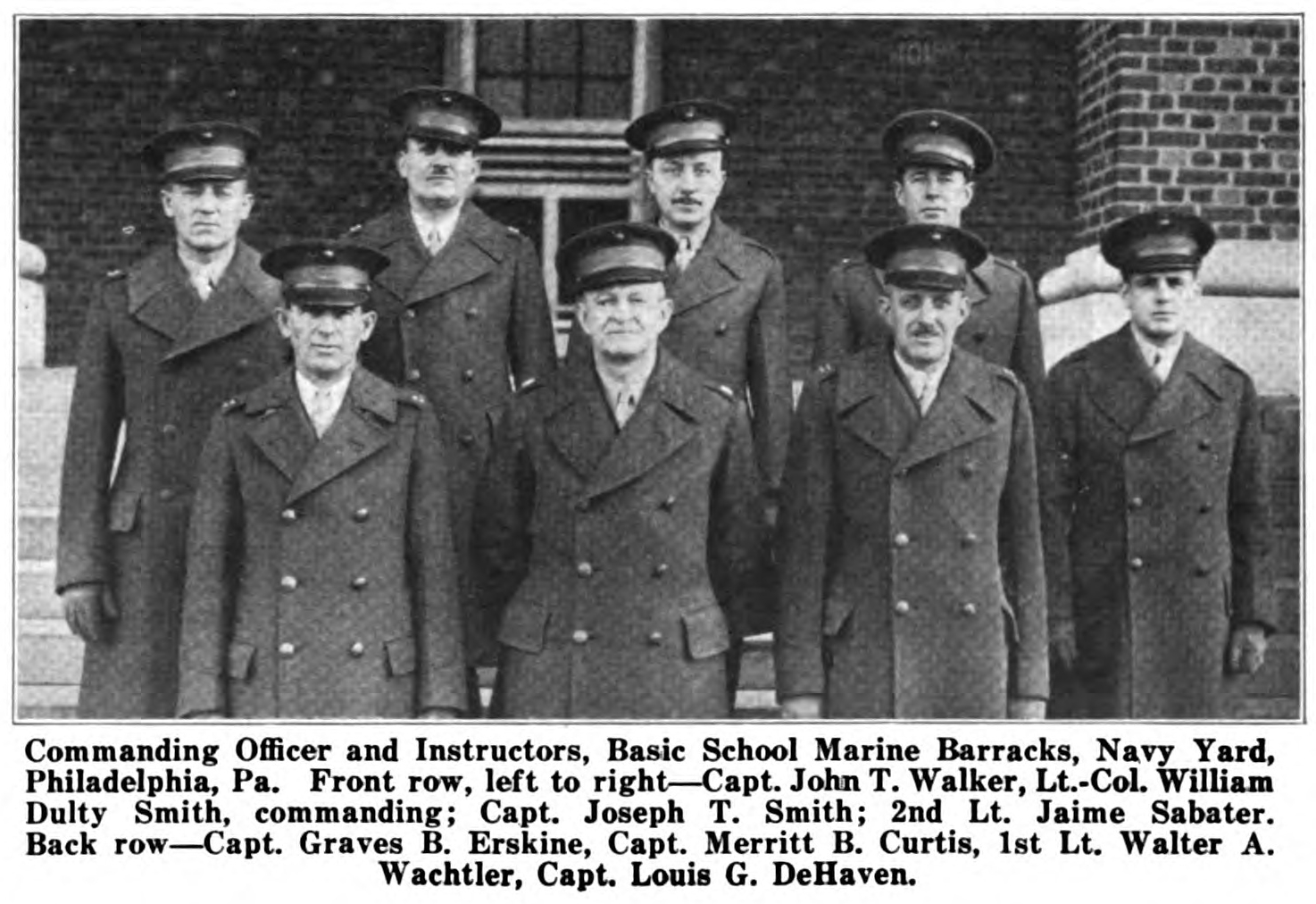
Curtis (back row, second from left) in Leatherneck Magazine, May 1932

Merritt Barton Curtis was born in 1892 at San Bernardino, California, son of Israel Hamilton Curtis and Eliza Allen Mee. He attended the University of California, Berkeley, where he earned his Bachelor of Arts degree in 1916. Curtis subsequently entered the Marine Corps on August 10, 1917, and was commissioned second lieutenant on that date. He also married Francis Claire Bracewell on April 23, 1917, at Riverside, California.

Curtis was assigned to the Marine Barracks Quantico, Virginia, and served there during the whole duration of World War I. He was transferred to the 1st Provisional Brigade of Marine and sent for duties in Haiti on June 1, 1920. Curtis was transferred to Garde d'Haïti in January 1922 and served there until October 1923, when he returned to the United States. He was assigned back to the Marine Barracks Quantico after his arrival, but at the beginning of April 1924, Curtis was transferred to the Naval Submarine Base New London, Connecticut, where he was appointed commanding officer of the local Marine detachment.

He was later transferred at Headquarters Marine Corps in Washington, D.C., where he was assigned to the Paymaster's Office. During his duties in Washington, D.C., Curtis attended George Washington University and earned a Bachelor of Laws degree in 1927. As a lawyer, he was a member of the bar in California.

== World War II ==
Curtis was appointed executive officer of the Paymaster's at Headquarters Marine Corps in Washington, D.C., and served there until December 1944 under the command of Brigadier General Raymond R. Wright. During his time in this capacity, he was promoted to the rank of colonel on April 29, 1942. Curtis was promoted to the rank of brigadier general in December 1944 and appointed paymaster within Fleet Marine Force, Pacific. He was stationed at Hawaii and later also participated in Philippines Campaign. For his service in this capacity, he was decorated with the Navy Commendation Medal.

Curtis returned to Headquarters Marine Corps in Washington, D.C., in August 1946 and was appointed chief of disbursing branch. He was responsible for Naval rating and for maintaining of personnel records, preparing reports and accomplishing accounting procedures. Curtis served in this capacity until his retirement from the Marine Corps in June 1949.

== Later life ==
In 1960, the Constitution Party put up retired Marine Corps Brigadier General Merritt B. Curtis for president, and B. N. Miller for vice-president in the state of Washington. Curtis received 1,401 votes for 0.11% of the Washington vote. Curtis received 18,162 votes as a candidate for vice-president in Texas, and 1,767 votes in Michigan.

Curtis died in 1966 while a resident of Washington, D.C., and is buried at Arlington National Cemetery.

== Decorations ==
Here is the ribbon bar of Brigadier General Merritt B. Curtis:

1st Row	Navy Commendation Medal	Marine Corps Expeditionary Medal with two stars	World War I Victory Medal	
2nd Row	Haitian Campaign Medal	Yangtze Service Medal	China Service Medal	American Defense Service Medal
3rd Row	American Campaign Medal	Asiatic-Pacific Campaign Medal	World War II Victory Medal	Philippine Liberation Medal
