= Council Bluffs, Iowa =

City in Pottawatomie County, Iowa, U.S.

- City
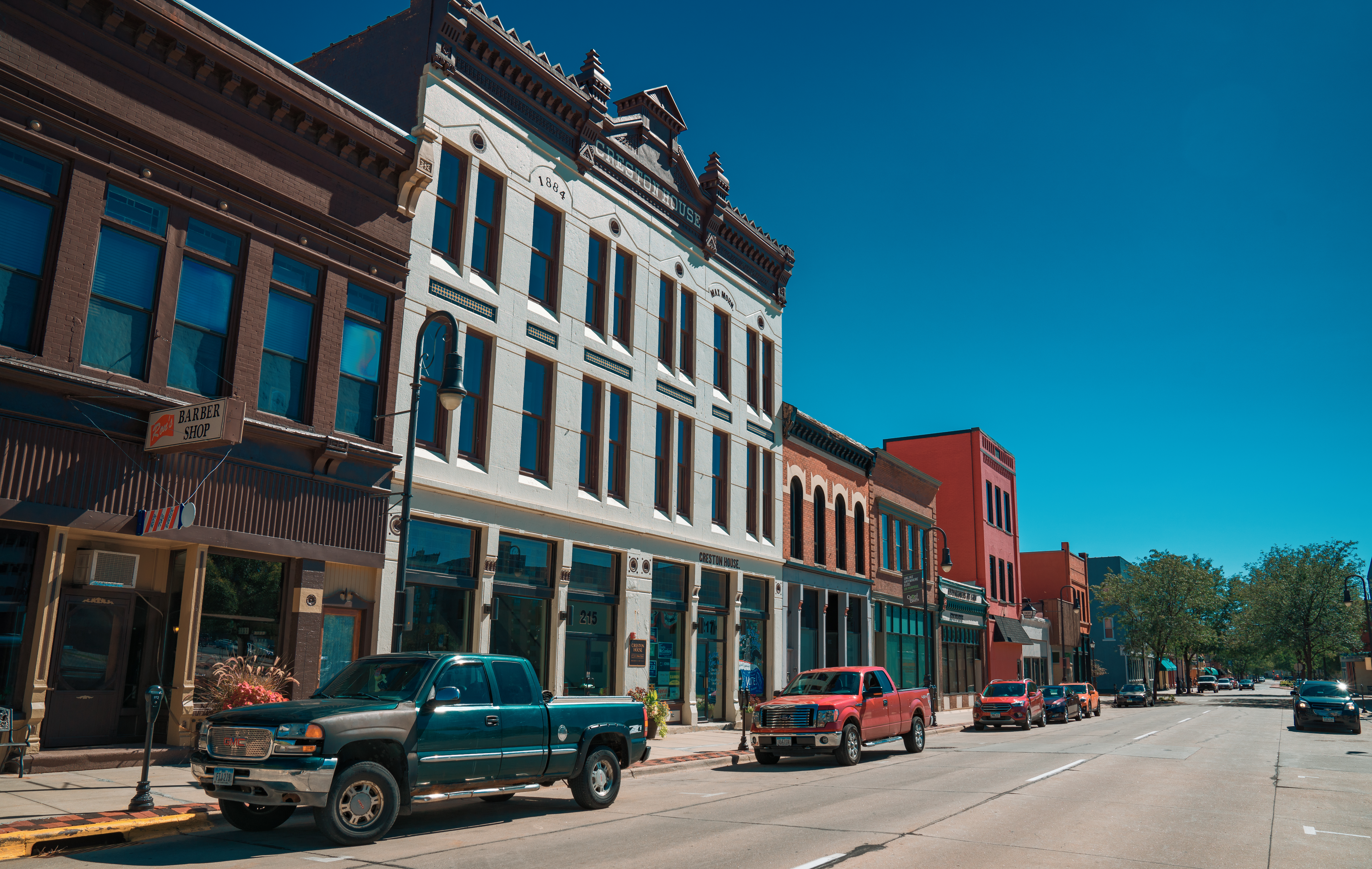
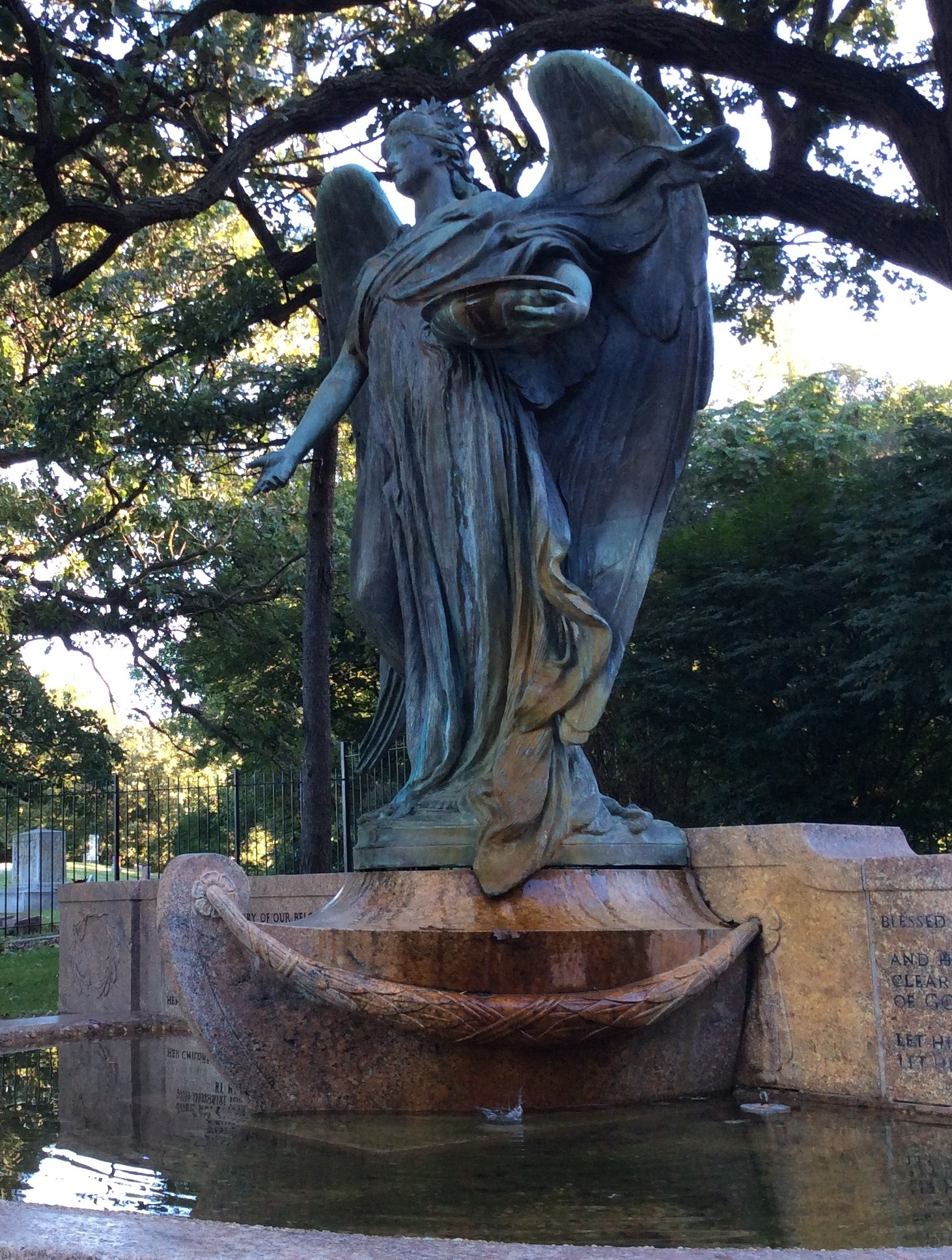
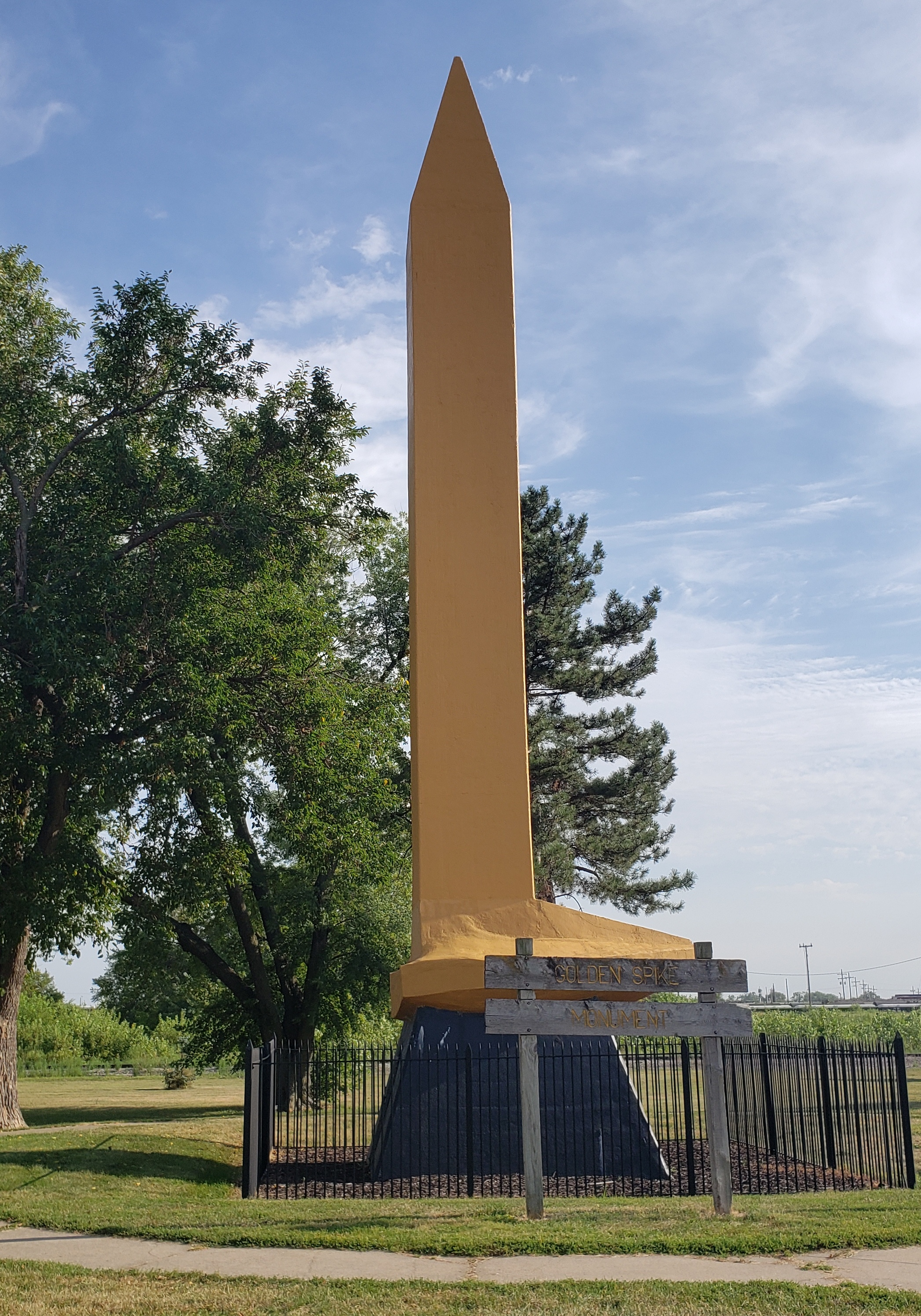
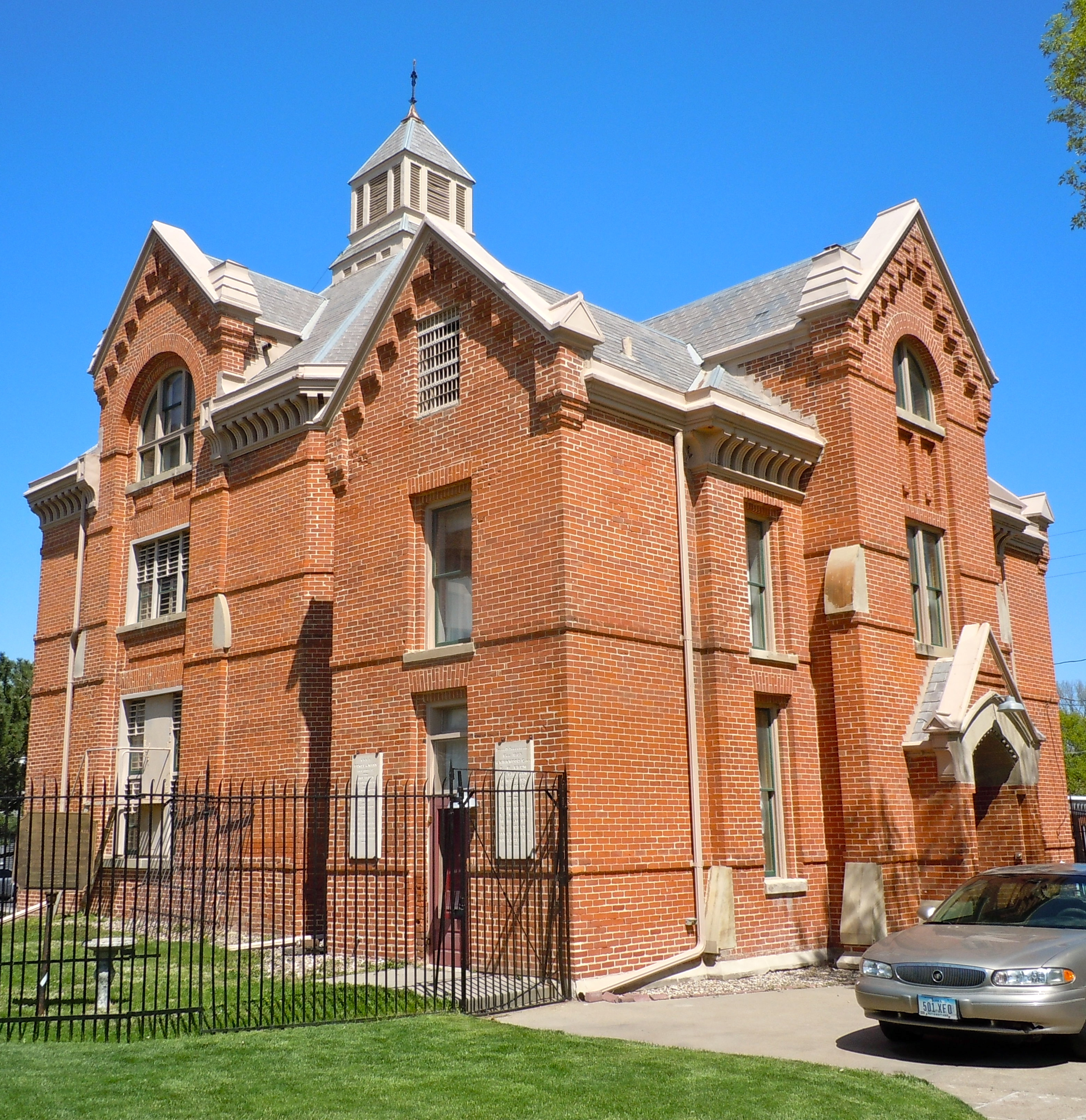
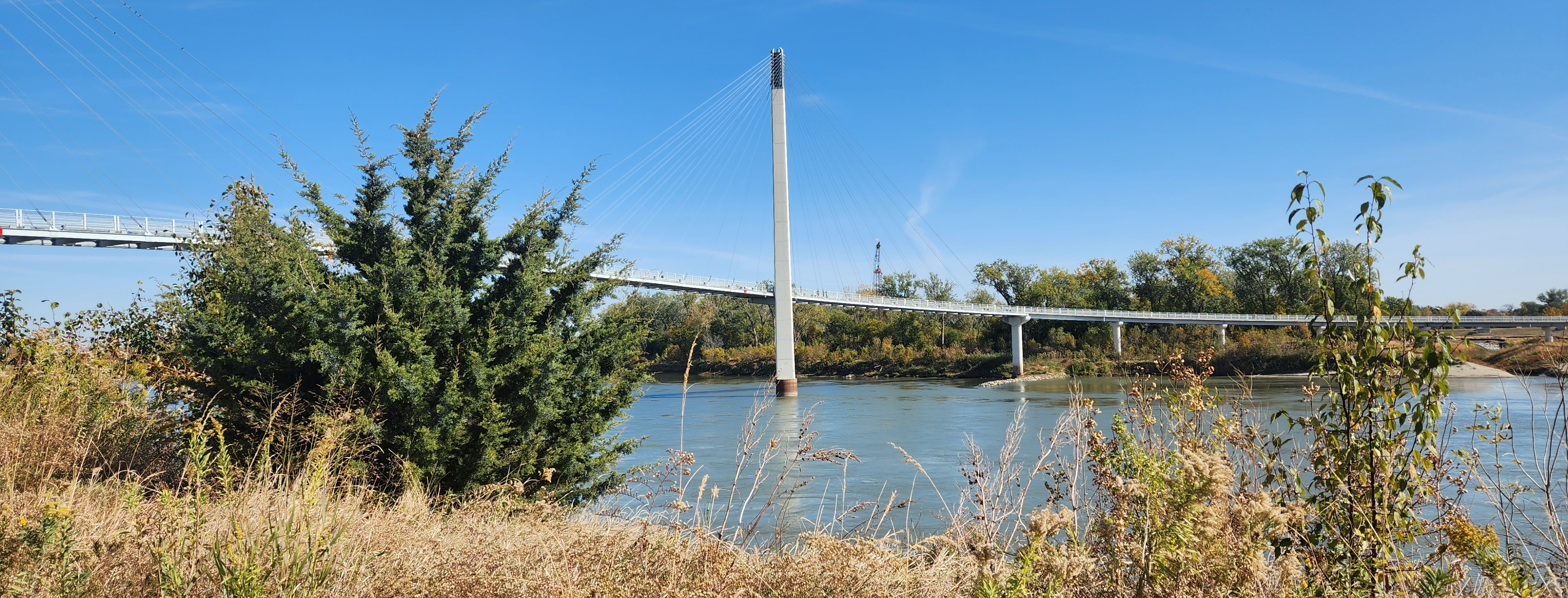
- Haymarket Commercial Historic District Ruth Dodge Memorial Golden Spike Monument Pottawattamie Co. Squirrel Cage Jail Bob Kerrey Pedestrian Bridge and Missouri River

- Seal
- Nickname: "The Gateway of the American West"
- Motto: "Iowa's Spirit"
- Location of Council Bluffs in Pottawattamie County, Iowa

- Location in Iowa Location in the United States
- Coordinates: 41°14′12″N 95°51′07″W
- Country: United States
- State: Iowa
- County: Pottawattamie, Mills
- Incorporated: January 19, 1853

Area
  - City: 45.672 sq mi (118.290 km^{2})
  - Land: 42.964 sq mi (111.275 km^{2})
  - Water: 2.709 sq mi (7.016 km^{2})
- Elevation: 978 ft (298 m)

Population (2024)
  - City: 62,665
  - Estimate (July 1, 2024): 62,665
  - Rank: US: 619th IA: 10th
  - Density: 1,452.4/sq mi (560.79/km^{2})
  - Urban: 819,508 (US: 55th)
  - Metro: 1,001,010 (US: 51st)
- Time zone: UTC−6 (Central (CST))
  - Summer (DST): UTC−5 (CDT)
- ZIP Codes: 51501, 51502, 51503
- Area code: 712
- FIPS code: 19-16860
- GNIS feature ID: 2393650
- Sales tax: 7.0%
- Website: councilbluffs-ia.gov

Council Bluffs is a city in and the county seat of Pottawattamie County, Iowa, United States. A small portion of the city extends into Mills County. Located on the east bank of the Missouri River, it sits across from Omaha, Nebraska. The city had a population of 62,799 at the 2020 census, making it the tenth-most populous city in Iowa and the largest in Southwest Iowa. Council Bluffs is also a principal city in the Omaha–Council Bluffs metropolitan area.

Until about 1853, Council Bluffs was known as Kanesville. Kanesville was the historic starting point of the Mormon Trail. Kanesville is also the northernmost anchor town of the other emigrant trails because there was a steam-powered boat which ferried the settlers' wagons and cattle across the Missouri River. In 1869, the first transcontinental railroad to California was connected to the existing U.S. rail network at Council Bluffs.

== History ==
=== 1804–1843: Pottawattamie reservation and Caldwell's Camp ===
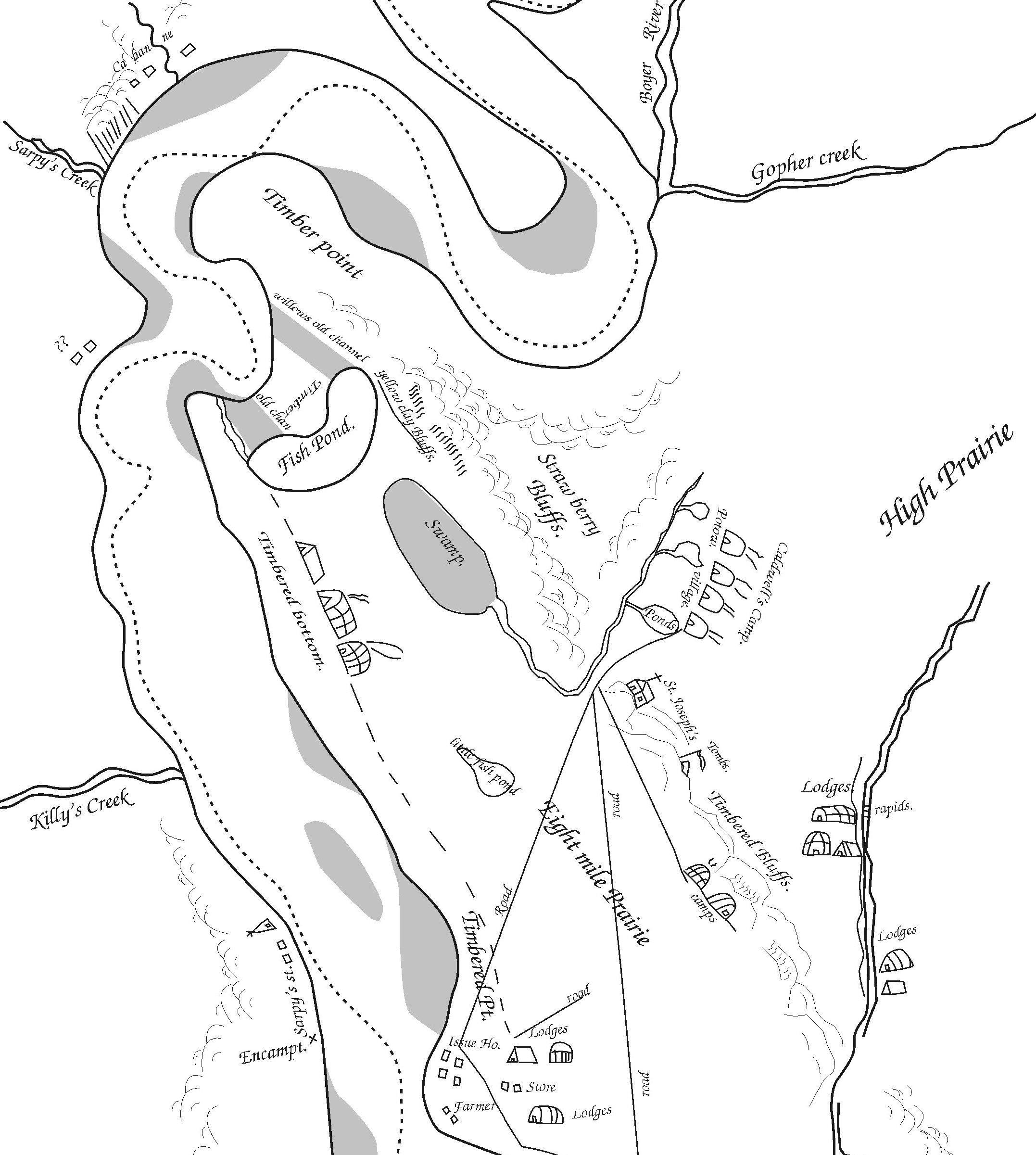
Pierre-Jean De Smet's map of the Council Bluffs area, 1839 The area labeled Caldwell's Camp was a Potawatomi village led by Sauganash, near the site of Kanesville, later named Council Bluffs.

The first Council Bluff (which is singular) was on the Nebraska side of the river at Fort Atkinson, about 20 miles (32 km) northwest of the city of Council Bluffs. It was named by Lewis and Clark for a bluff where they met the Otoe people on August 2, 1804.

The Iowa side of the river became an Indian Reservation in the 1830s for members of the Council of Three Fires of Chippewa, Ottawa, and Potawatomi who were forced to leave the Chicago area under the Treaty of Chicago. This cleared the way for the city of Chicago to incorporate.

The largest group of Native Americans who moved to the area were the Pottawatomi, who were led by their chief Sauganash ("one who speaks English"), the son of British loyalist William Caldwell and a Mohawk woman. The senior Caldwell founded Canadian communities on the south side of the Detroit River.

Seeking to avoid confrontation with the Sioux, who were natives of the Council Bluffs area, the 1,000 to 2,000 Pottawattamie initially had settled east of the Missouri River in Indian territory between Leavenworth, Kansas and St. Joseph, Missouri. When the area was bought from Ioway, Sac and Fox tribes in the Platte Purchase and part of Missouri in 1837, Sauganash and the Pottawatomi were forced to move to their assigned reservation in Council Bluffs.

Sauganash's English name was Billy Caldwell, and his village was called Caldwell's Camp. The tribe were sometimes called the Bluff Indians. U.S. Army dragoons built a small fort nearby.

In 1838–39, the missionary Pierre-Jean De Smet founded St. Joseph's Mission to minister to the Potawatomi. De Smet was appalled by the violence and brutality caused by the whiskey trade and tried to protect the tribe from unscrupulous traders. However, he had little success in persuading tribal members to convert to Christianity and resorted to secret baptisms of Indian children.

During this time, De Smet contributed to Joseph Nicollet's work in mapping the upper Midwest. De Smet produced the first European-recorded, detailed map of the Council Bluffs area; it detailed the Missouri River valley system, from below the Platte River to the Big Sioux River.

De Smet wrote an early description of the Potawatomi settlement:

Imagine a great number of cabins and tents, made of the bark of trees, buffalo skins, coarse cloth, rushes and sods, all of a mournful and funereal aspect, of all sizes and shapes, some supported by one pole, others having six, and with the covering stretched in all the different styles imaginable, and all scattered here and there in the greatest confusion, and you will have an Indian village.

As more Native Americans were pushed into the Council Bluffs area by pressure of European-American settlement to the east, intertribal conflict increased, fueled by the illegal whiskey trade. The US Army built Fort Croghan in 1842, to keep order and try to control liquor traffic on the Missouri River. However, the fort was destroyed in a flood later in the same year.

By 1846 the Pottawatomi were forced to move again to a new reservation at Osawatomie, Kansas.

=== 1844–1851: Mormon community of Kanesville ===
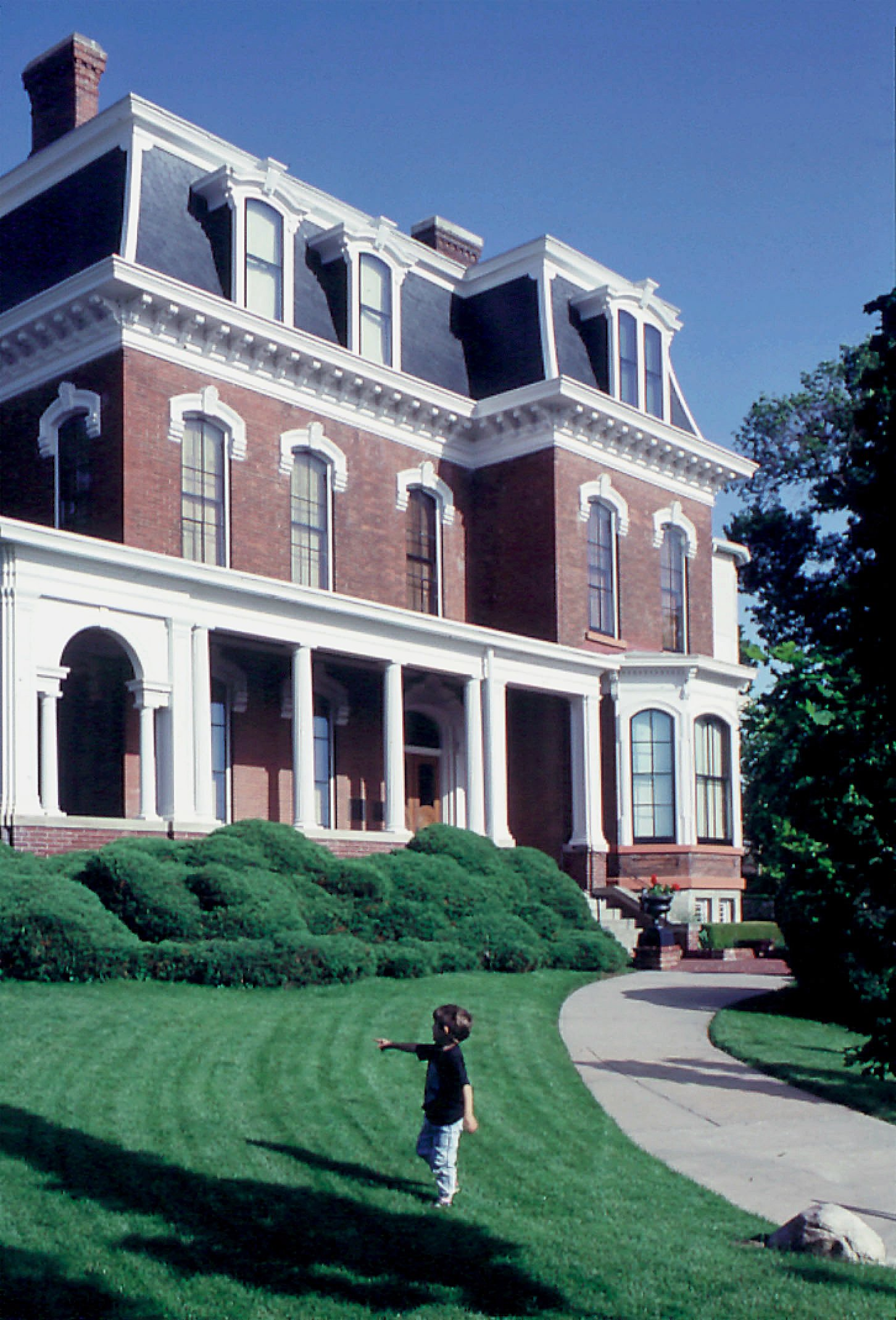
The Grenville M. Dodge House (1869) is listed on the National Register of Historic Places

In 1844, the Stephens-Townsend-Murphy Party crossed the Missouri River here, on their way to blaze a new path into California across the Sierra Nevada Mountains. Beginning in 1846, a large influx of Latter-day Saints entered the area, although in the winter of 1847–1848 most Latter-day Saints crossed to the Nebraska side of the Missouri River. Initially, the area was called "Miller's Hollow", after Henry W. Miller; a settler, he was the first member of the Iowa State Legislature to be from this area. Miller also was the foreman for the construction of the Kanesville Tabernacle.

By 1848, the town had become known as Kanesville, named for benefactor Thomas L. Kane. He had helped negotiate federal permission in Washington, D.C. for the Mormons to use Indian land along the Missouri as their winter encampment of 1846–47. Built next to or at Caldwell's Camp, Kanesville became the main outfitting point for the Mormon Exodus to Utah; it is the recognized head of the Mormon Trail.

Edwin Carter, who would become a noted naturalist in Colorado, worked here from 1848 to 1859 in a dry goods store. He helped supply Mormon wagon trains.

Settlers who departed west from Kanesville into the sparsely settled, unorganized parts of the Territory of Missouri traveled to the Oregon Country and the newly conquered California Territory. They traversed the (eventual) Nebraska Territory traveling in wagon trains along the much-storied Oregon, Mormon, or California Trails into the newly expanded United States western lands.

After the first large organized wagon trains left Missouri in 1841, the annual migration waves began in earnest by the spring of 1843. They built up thereafter, with the opening of the Mormon Trail (1846) and peaked in the later 1860s. After that, news of the progress of railroads constructed across the west reduced the number of travelers who endured the wagon trains.

By the 1860s, virtually all migration wagon trains passed near the town now named Council Bluffs. The wagon train trails became less important with the advent of the first complete transcontinental railway in 1869, but while trail use diminished after that, their use continued on at lesser rates until late in the nineteenth century.

The Mormon Battalion began its march from Kanesville to California during the Mexican–American War, which began This area was where Mormons first began to openly practice plural marriage. Orson Hyde began to publish The Frontier Guardian newspaper, and Brigham Young was named as the second president of the Church of Jesus Christ of Latter-day Saints (LDS church). The community was transformed by the California Gold Rush, and the majority of Mormons left for Utah by 1852.

=== 1852–1900: Beginning of the railroad era ===
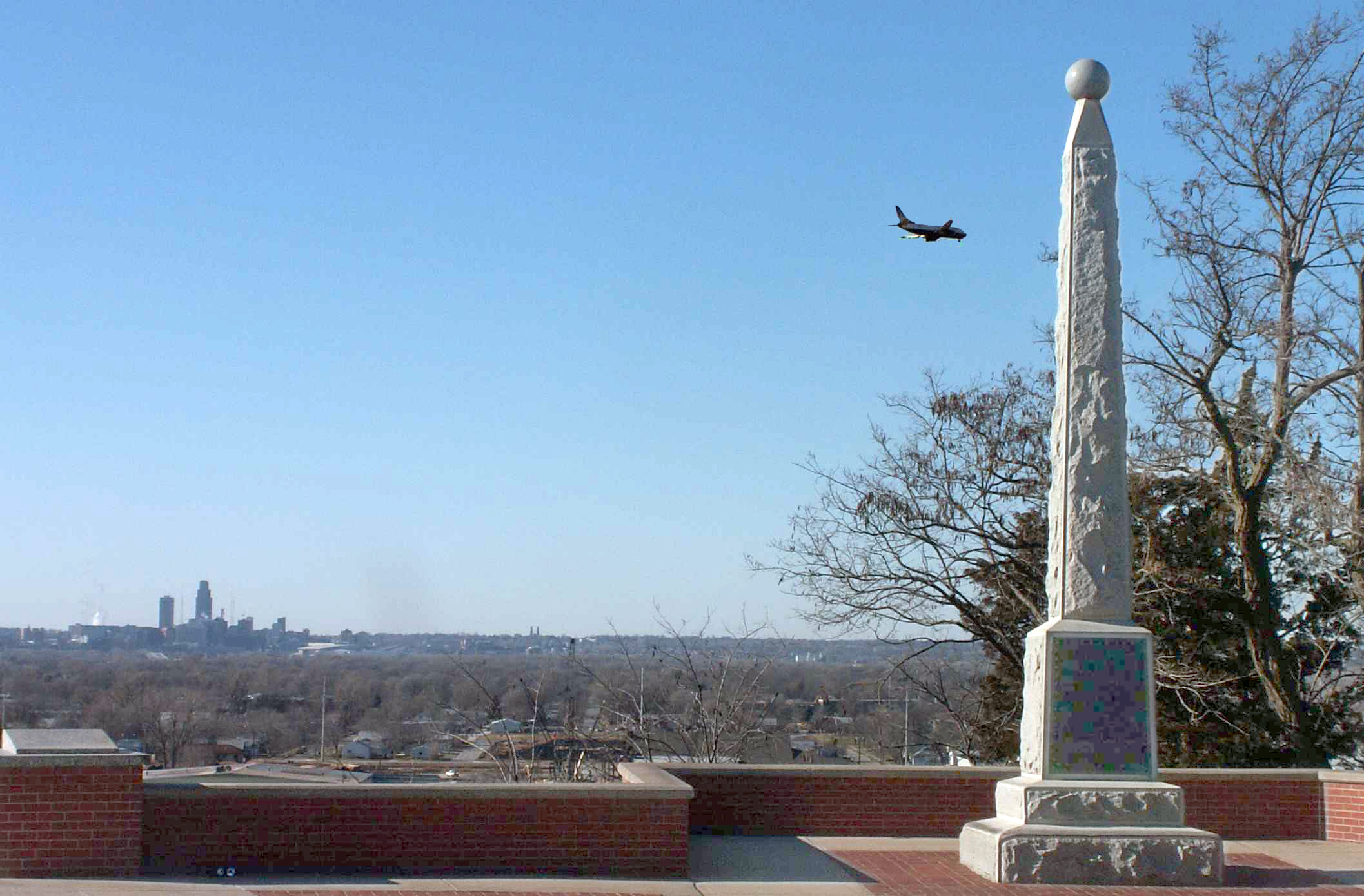
Lincoln Memorial at Council Bluffs, marking where President Abraham Lincoln was said to have selected the site as the eastern terminus of the Transcontinental Railroad.

By 1852, the number of Mormons was declining due to their further westward movement. The town took the name Council Bluffs after a cliff called Council Bluff that was 20 miles to the north. Fort Atkinson was built there in 1820. That cliff, or bluff, was named after the so-called Otoe council. This was an August 1804 meeting of the Lewis and Clark Expedition with senior members of the Otoe and Missouria Native American tribes.

Council Bluffs continued as a major outfitting point on the Missouri River for the Emigrant Trail and Pike's Peak Gold Rush. A river port, it had a lively steamboat trade. In 1863 an anonymous soldier on his way to fight the Dakota Uprising passed through Council Bluffs. He described it as a hardscrabble town:

At Council Bluffs our arrival was greeted by a few rounds from the old six pounder, while the streets were lined with a curiosity-seeking class of humanity, among which could easily be traced the physiognomy of bipeds of almost every clime—all here to make money. The cute Yankee whittling out wooden hams to sell to Pikes' Peak emigrants, the Chatham Street peddler, with his stock of "oht clo's," ready to swear that he had them manufactured expressly for his western trade; the mock auctioneer, the jeweler with his pinchback jewelry of all kinds; horse and mule jockeys, gamblers, thieves, assassin—and the mischief knows what not, rather than what is—all congregated in this little 7×9 city, stuck in a great ravine, 3 miles from the Missouri River. When you understand that this is the great entrepot for emigration across the Plains, you will readily comprehend that this is a good point at which to "take (a) stranger in," and it is done almost every day. Our stay at Council Bluffs was very short (two days) and I think no one was sorry to leave it.

— Soldier of the 6th Iowa Cavalry, Linn County Register, 15 August 1863, p.2

Council Bluffs (rather than Omaha) was designated by President Abraham Lincoln as the official starting point of the transcontinental railroad, which was completed in 1869. The official "Mile 0" start is at 21st Street and 9th Avenue. It is now marked by a gold spike monument, which was erected to promote the movie Union Pacific. Council Bluffs' physical connection to the Transcontinental Railroad was delayed until 1872, when the Union Pacific Missouri River Bridge opened. (Before that, railroad cars had to be ferried across the Missouri River from Council Bluffs to Omaha in the early days of the Transcontinental).

The Chicago and North Western Transportation Company arrived in 1867. Other railroads operating in the city were the Chicago, Rock Island and Pacific Railroad, Chicago Great Western Railway, Wabash Railroad, Illinois Central Railroad, and the Chicago, Burlington and Quincy Railroad as well as the Chicago, Milwaukee, St. Paul and Pacific Railroad.

=== 1901–present ===
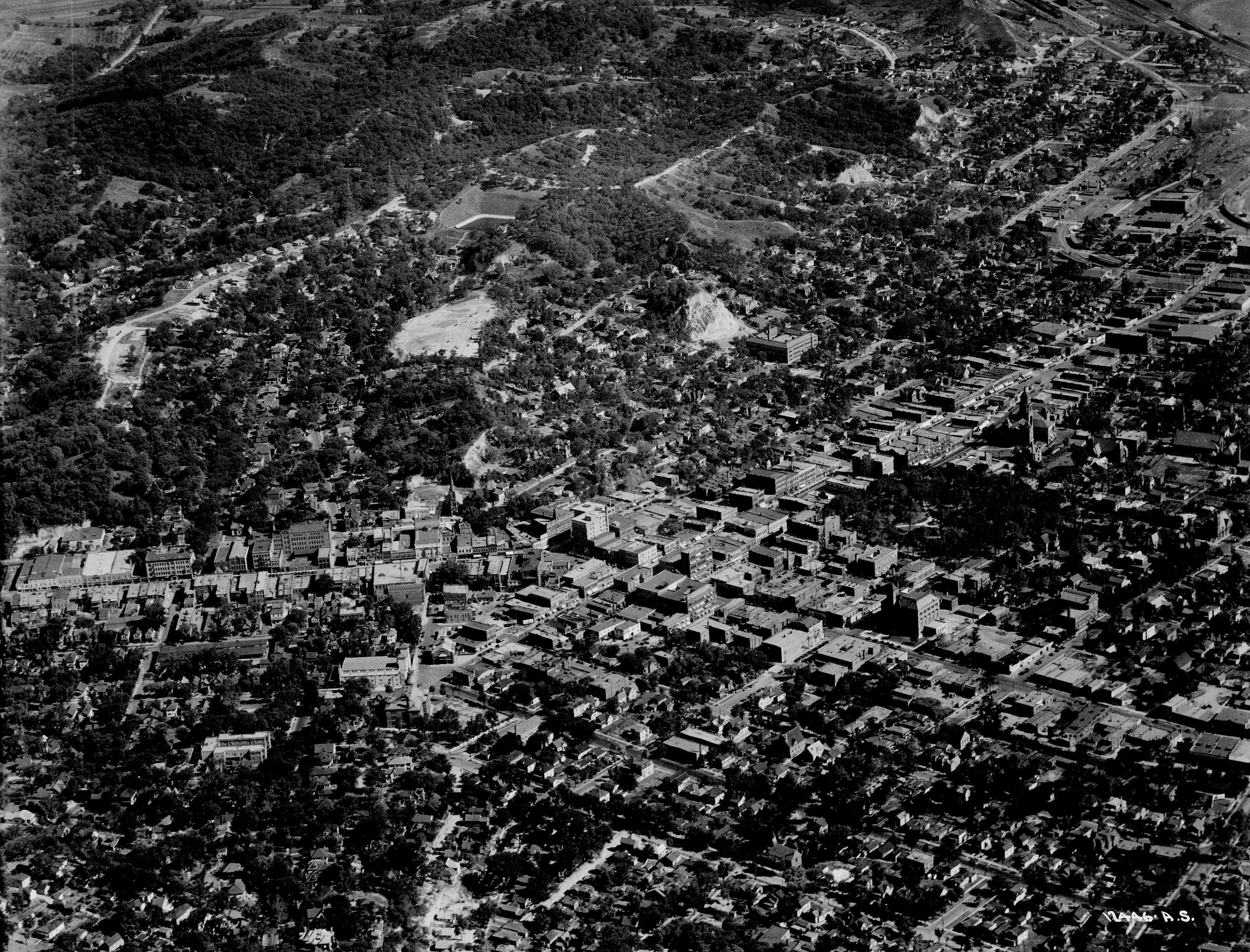
Council Bluffs in 1926

In 1926, the portion of Council Bluffs west of the Missouri River seceded to form Carter Lake, Iowa. Carter Lake had been cut off by a change in the course of the Missouri River.

By the 1930s, Council Bluffs had grown into the country's fifth largest rail center. The railroads helped the city become a center for grain storage, and in grain elevators continue to mark the city's skyline. Other industries in the city included Blue Star Foods, Dwarfies Cereal, Frito-Lay, Georgie Porgie Cereal, Giant Manufacturing, Kimball Elevators, Mona Motor Oil, Monarch, Reliance Batteries, Woodward's Candy, and World Radio. During the 1940s Meyer Lansky operated a greyhound racing track in Council Bluffs.

Restructuring of the railroad industry caused the loss of many jobs after the mid-20th century, as did the restructuring of heavy industry. Many jobs moved offshore. By the late 20th century, the city and region were suffering economic stagnation and a declining population, as they struggled to develop a new economy. Downtown urban renewal was undertaken to create a new future while emphasizing the strengths of heritage.

Council Bluffs was prominently featured on an episode of Bar Rescue, when Jon Taffer visited the O'Face Bar. This would also be the first ever instance of Taffer walking out on a bar in the series.

== Geography ==
According to the United States Census Bureau, the city has a total area of 45.672 square miles (118.29 km^{2}), of which 42.963 square miles (111.27 km^{2}) is land and 2.709 square miles (7.02 km^{2}) is water.

Council Bluffs covers a unique topographic region originally composed of prairie and savanna in the Loess Hills with extensive wetlands and deciduous forest along the Missouri River. Excellent vistas can be had from KOIL Point at Fairmont Park, the Lincoln Monument, Kirn Park, and the Lewis and Clark Monument. Lake Manawa State Park is located at the southern edge of the city.

=== Neighborhoods ===
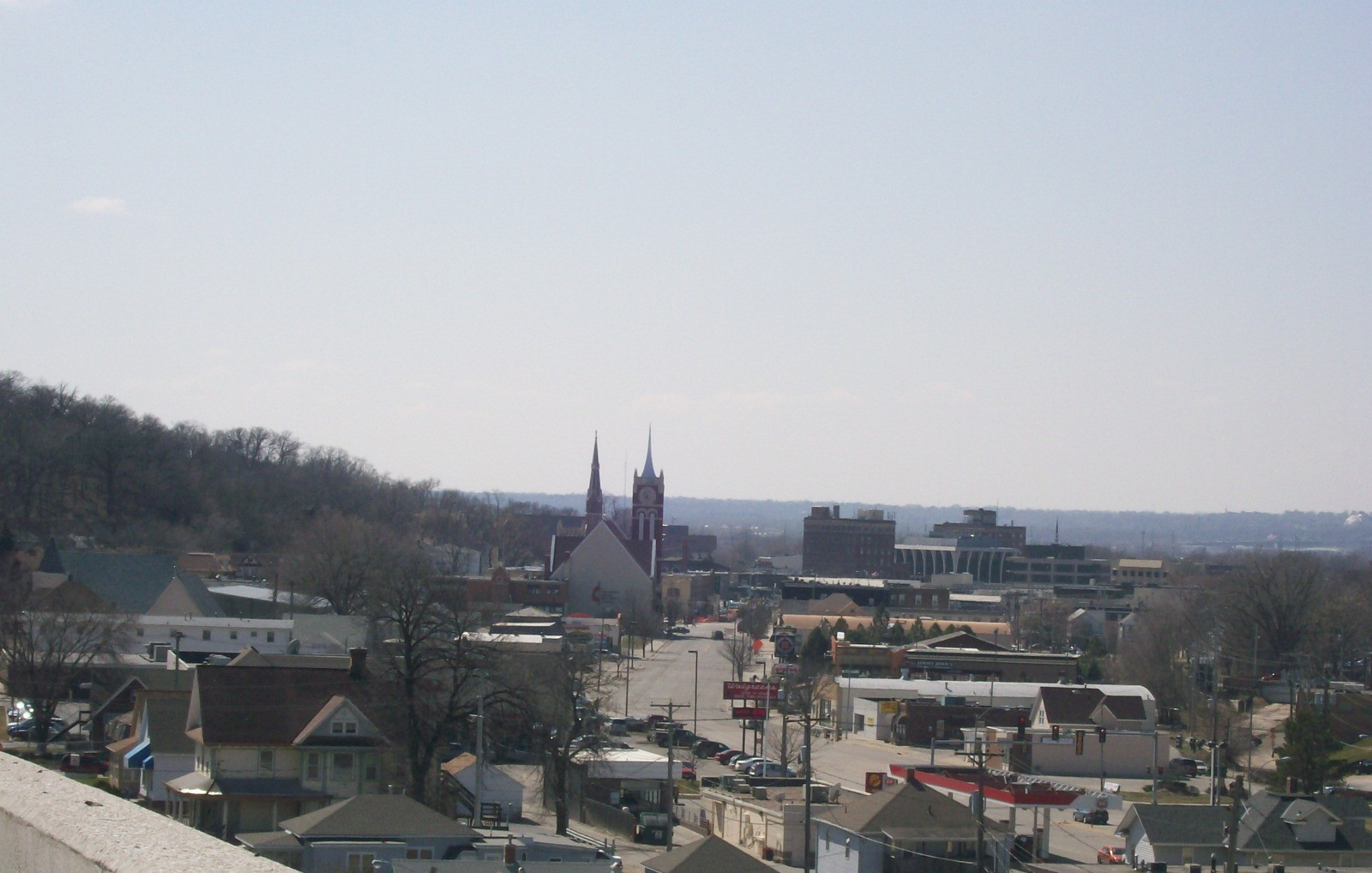
Downtown Council Bluffs looking west along East Broadway

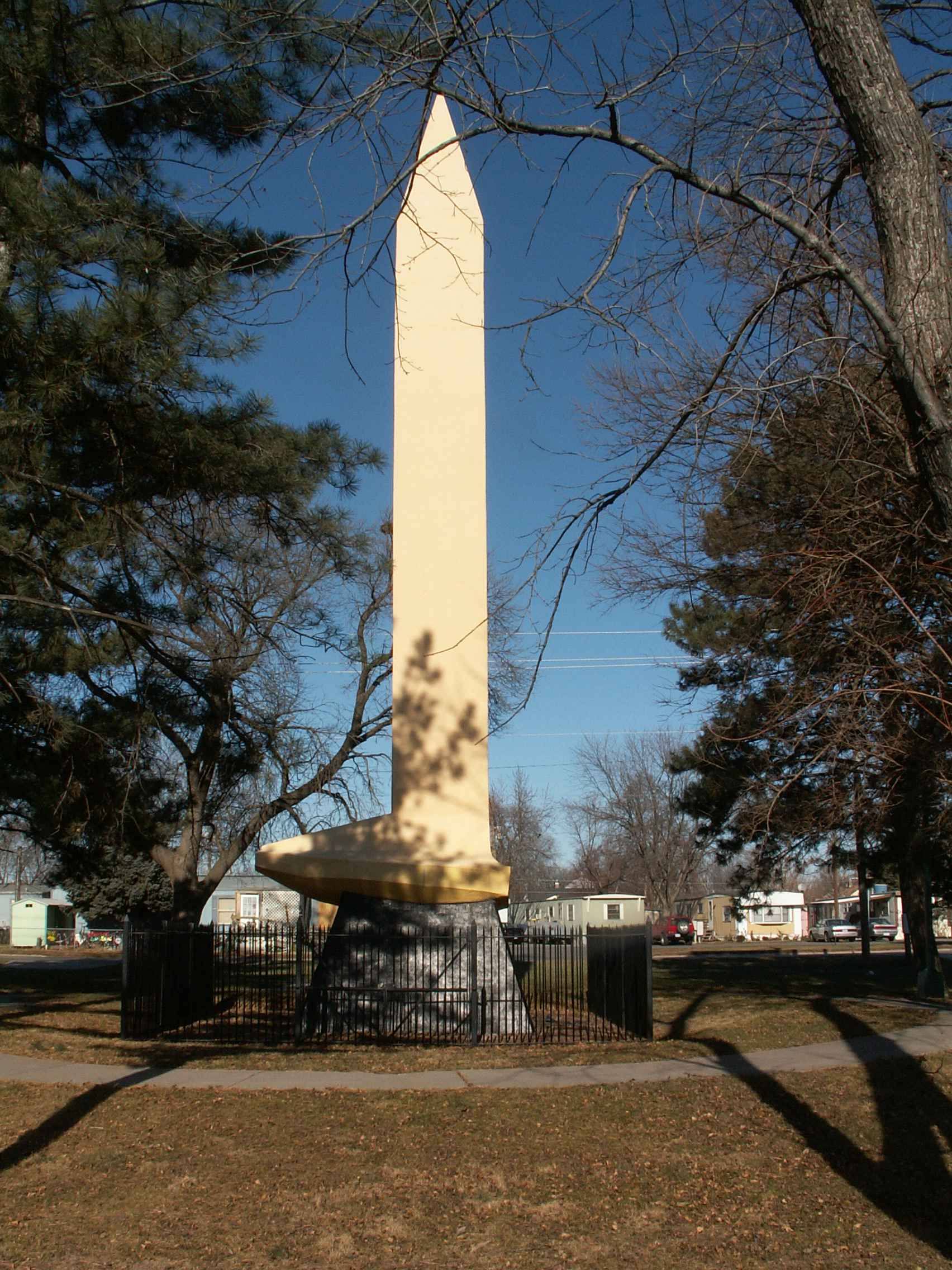
The Golden Spike Monument was dedicated in 1939 during the world premiere of Union Pacific at milepost 0 of the transcontinental railroad

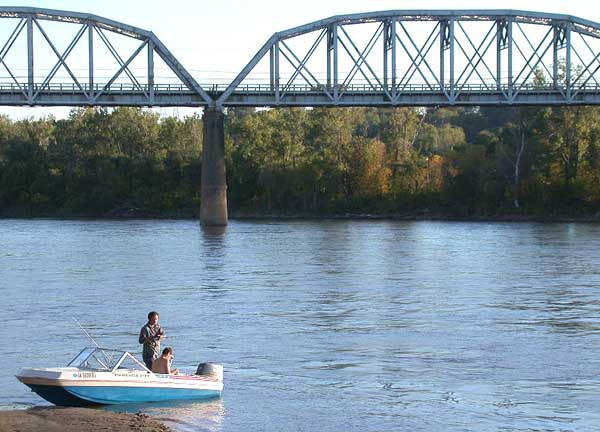
Fishermen on the Missouri River in Council Bluffs, facing the Union Pacific Bridge

==== Downtown Council Bluffs ====
Downtown Council Bluffs historically was the area along West Broadway and adjacent streets from Old Town west to the Chicago and North Western Transportation Company Railroad passenger depot at 11th Street. The downtown area developed as the economic rival of Old Town after the 1853 opening of the Pacific House Hotel by Samuel S. Bayliss and until the 1867 completion of the Chicago and Northwestern. In 1899, the Illinois Central passenger depot opened at 12th St. and West Broadway.

Downtown declined as the city's primary retail center after the 1955 completion of the Broadway Viaduct, 1970s urban renewal, and the 1984 opening of the Kanesville Boulevard U.S. Route 6 bypass. Remaining buildings of note include the 1959 Council Bluffs Post Office and Federal Building at 6th Street, the 1986 "Red" Nelson Building, the 501 Main Building, the substantially altered 1909 City National Bank Building, and the 1968 First Federal Building. The 1947 State Savings Bank Building at 509 West Broadway and the seven-story 1924 Bennett Building at 405 West Broadway are both listed on the National Register of Historic Places. The 100 Block of West Broadway is a historic district listed on the National Register of Historic Places and the 1892 Broadway United Methodist Church at West Broadway and 1st St. remains a prominent community landmark.

==== Old Town Council Bluffs ====
Old Town Council Bluffs was adjudged by Judge Frank Street in the 1850s to be the area between West Broadway and Glen Avenue and East Broadway and Frank Street from Harmony Street south to Pierce Street. The area encompasses Billy Caldwell's settlement of Potawatomi on Indian Creek during the 1830s and Kanesville established by the Mormons as Miller's Hollow in 1848. Kanesville was the home of Mormon leaders Orson Hyde, George A. Smith, and Ezra T. Benson and was a major outfitting point on the Mormon Trail during the California Gold Rush. The reconstructed Kanesville Tabernacle in the 300 block of East Broadway is operated as a museum by the LDS Church.

==== The West End ====
The West End is a geographically large area on the flood plain east of the Missouri River and downtown Omaha, Nebraska, west of 10th St. and the Broadway Viaduct, and north of 9th Ave. and the Union Pacific Transfer railyards. These neighborhoods of long, tree-shaded avenues are divided by the commercial corridor of West Broadway (U.S. Route 6), once part of the Lincoln Highway. This stretch of West Broadway has traditionally had several drive-in fast food restaurants and automobile dealerships with several grain elevators adjacent along 1st Avenue. West Broadway ends at the Interstate 480 bridge to downtown Omaha. Iowa Highway 192 follows North 16th St. from West Broadway to Interstate 29. Neighborhood landmarks include the 1890s Illinois Central Railroad Missouri River bridge, Stan Bahnsen Park, the Golden Spike Monument, the Narrows River Park, Big Lake Park, the site of Dodge Park Playland, the Dodge Christian Church (built with the N.P. Dodge Memorial funds and now known as Citylight West Council Bluffs), and many examples of late 19th and early 20th century residential architecture. The West End was used as a location by film director Alexander Payne in the movies Citizen Ruth and About Schmidt.

==== Casino Row ====
Casino Row is located on and near the Missouri River south of West Broadway and Interstate 480, west of South 35th St. and Interstate 29, and north of Interstate 80 along 23rd Avenue west of South 24th St. The opening of the Bluffs Run Greyhound Park in 1986, now the Horseshoe Council Bluffs, was followed in the mid-1990s by riverboat casinos operated by Ameristar and Harvey's Casino Hotel (now Harrah's Council Bluffs). New development in this previously industrial area has included the Mid-America Center, several restaurants and hotels, and other businesses. The appearance of legalized gambling in Council Bluffs became a major issue in neighboring Omaha where Mayor Hal Daub had declared Iowa an "XXX state" in 1995 as horse-racing came to an end at Ak-Sar-Ben.

==== Twin City ====
Twin City is located south of where Interstate 29 splits from Interstate 80, east of South Omaha, Nebraska, west of Indian Creek, and north of the South Omaha Bridge Road (U.S. Route 275 and Iowa Highway 92). This neighborhood developed mostly during the 1960s for workers in nearby Omaha factories and at Offutt Air Force Base. The Interstate 80 Exit at 1-B at South 24th Street includes two large truck stops along with several motels, the Western Historic Trails Center, the Bluffs Acres manufactured home development, and The Marketplace shopping area. The Willows on the South Omaha Bridge Road is an example of mid-20th century roadside motel architecture and Bart's Motel further east at South 24th St featured prominent neon signage, was used as a location in the motion picture The Indian Runner, and has since been demolished.

==== Manawa ====
Manawa is the portion of Council Bluffs from the combined Interstate 80 and Interstate 29 south to the city limits between Mosquito and Indian Creeks. The area was developed as a trolley park by the Omaha and Council Bluffs Streetcar Company after the former channel of the Missouri River was "cut-off" during an 1881 flood to become modern Lake Manawa State Park. Later development followed the establishment of U.S. Route 275 and the completion of Interstate 80 with additional growth during the 1990s. A variety of fast food restaurants, motels, big-box stores, automobile dealerships, a large truck stop and other businesses are located between Interstate 80 and Interstate 29 south to the state park. The Lake Manawa Inn hosts early examples of roadside cabin architecture. In February and March, bald eagles and red-tailed hawks can frequently be seen at Lake Manawa, particularly along the southwest shore.

==== The South End ====
The South End is bordered by 12th Avenue on the north, South 16th St. and the Union Pacific Transfer railyards on the west, Interstate 80 and Interstate 29 on the south, and the South Expressway (Iowa Highway 192) on the east. This neighborhood developed during the late 19th century with the railroads, especially the Chicago, Rock Island and Pacific Railroad, the Chicago, Milwaukee and St. Paul Railway, and the Chicago, Burlington and Quincy Railroad. In the early 20th century much of the area was dubbed "Dane Town" or "Little Copenhagen" for the large number of Danish immigrants with several Croatian and Mexican families closer to the Union Pacific railyards at "Little Vienna". Neighborhood landmarks include Peterson Park, Longfellow School, and the 1899 Chicago, Rock Island and Pacific passenger depot, now the RailsWest Railroad Museum.

==== Oakland-Fairview ====
Oakland-Fairview developed during the 1890s and features a wealth of 19th-century architecture, including the Judge Finley Burke mansion at 510 Oakland built in 1893 out of Minnesota granite. The neighborhood is also home to the Lincoln Monument. Located at the western end of Lafayette Avenue, the monument was erected in 1911 by the local chapter of the Daughters of the American Revolution that, according to folklore, commemorates the spot where Abraham Lincoln decided on the location of the transcontinental railroad in 1859. The monument offers expansive views across the West End in the Missouri River Valley to Omaha, Nebraska. Nearby is the entrance to Fairview Cemetery, situated on the north side of Lafayette Avenue, which predates the establishment of the present city and includes the Kinsman Monument and the burial place of many early settlers, including Amelia Bloomer. At the east end of Lafayette Avenue where it intersects with North Second Street stands the Ruth Anne Dodge Memorial, the "Black Angel" designed by Daniel Chester French, although the wife of Grenville Dodge is actually buried elsewhere in Council Bluffs.

==== Madison Avenue ====
Madison Avenue is the area of Council Bluffs adjacent to Exit 5 of Interstate 80 along Madison and Bennett avenues, Valley View Drive, and the area between Iowa Highway 92 north to McPherson Avenue. Mosquito Creek flows through this area which was originally notable for the Potawatomi gristmill and now includes the usual roadside gas stations, fast food restaurants, motels, and the tracks of the Iowa Interstate Railroad. Plans for a shopping mall here first appeared in 1972 and construction finally began on the Mall of the Bluffs in 1985. Residential growth east of the railroad tracks towards State Orchard Road and the Council Bluffs Municipal Airport and north to U.S. Route 6 has included developments outside the Council Bluffs city limits.

==== Huntington Avenue ====
Huntington Avenue consists of early 20th century Craftsman homes which wind along the top of the Loess Hills past the 1925 studio of radio station KOIL; the station is now apartments.

The historic "Council Bluffs' Red-light district" was formed during the late 19th century, when at least 10 separate brothels were located on Pierce Street east of Park Avenue with another three brothels down the block on the south side of West Broadway east of Park. One 1890 newspaper article referenced in Lt. RL Miller's "Selected History of the Council Bluffs Police" noted the "places of vice and corruption on Pierce" and Stella Long's above the Ogden House along with the "terrible den at the corner of Market and Vine" and Belle Clover's bagnio at 8th St. and West Broadway.

1916 panoramic photograph of West Broadway showing the Council Bluffs Post Office (right) and Federal Building at 6th Street on the left when this was part of the Lincoln Highway

=== Environmental problems ===
In 2010, the Iowa Department of Natural Resources found that air in central Council Bluffs measured above the national air quality standard for lead, most likely due to lead emissions in this area by Griffin Pipe Products Company. In 2011, EPA found numerous violations of the Clean Water Act, because the plant's contaminated stormwater commingled with treated process wastewater and was pumped out to the storm sewer, which discharged into the Missouri River.

== Demographics ==
Historical population
| Census | Pop. | Note | %± |
|---|---|---|---|
| 1860 | 2,011 | | — |
| 1870 | 10,020 | | 398.3% |
| 1880 | 18,063 | | 80.3% |
| 1890 | 21,474 | | 18.9% |
| 1900 | 25,802 | | 20.2% |
| 1910 | 29,292 | | 13.5% |
| 1920 | 36,162 | | 23.5% |
| 1930 | 42,048 | | 16.3% |
| 1940 | 41,439 | | −1.4% |
| 1950 | 45,429 | | 9.6% |
| 1960 | 55,641 | | 22.5% |
| 1970 | 60,348 | | 8.5% |
| 1980 | 56,449 | | −6.5% |
| 1990 | 54,315 | | −3.8% |
| 2000 | 58,268 | | 7.3% |
| 2010 | 62,230 | | 6.8% |
| 2020 | 62,799 | | 0.9% |
| 2023 (est.) | 62,399 | | −0.6% |
U.S. Decennial Census; Iowa State Data Center; 2020 Census

Council Bluffs is the primary city of the Omaha-Council Bluffs Metropolitan Area.

=== 2020 census ===
Council Bluffs, Iowa – Racial Composition (NH = Non-Hispanic) Note: the US Census treats Hispanic/Latino as an ethnic category. This table excludes Latinos from the racial categories and assigns them to a separate category. Hispanics/Latinos can be of any race.
| Race | Number | Percentage |
|---|---|---|
| White (NH) | 50,787 | 80.9% |
| Black or African American (NH) | 1,679 | 2.7% |
| Native American or Alaska Native (NH) | 310 | 0.5% |
| Asian (NH) | 640 | 1.0% |
| Pacific Islander (NH) | 67 | 0.1% |
| Some Other Race (NH) | 201 | 0.3% |
| Mixed/Multi-Racial (NH) | 2,607 | 4.2% |
| Hispanic or Latino | 6,508 | 10.4% |
| Total | 62,799 | 100.0% |

As of the 2020 census, there were 62,799 people residing in Council Bluffs. The population density was 1,461.7 inhabitants per square mile (564.4/km^{2}). The median age was 38.3 years; 23.1% of residents were under the age of 18 and 16.9% were 65 years of age or older. For every 100 females there were 97.5 males, and for every 100 females age 18 and over there were 94.8 males age 18 and over.

There were 25,271 households and 15,302 families. Of all households, 28.9% had children under the age of 18 living in them, 39.1% were married-couple households, 21.3% were households with a male householder and no spouse or partner present, and 30.6% were households with a female householder and no spouse or partner present. About 32.0% of all households were made up of individuals, and 12.7% had someone living alone who was 65 years of age or older.

There were 27,100 housing units, of which 6.7% were vacant. The homeowner vacancy rate was 1.5% and the rental vacancy rate was 7.0%.

About 98.6% of residents lived in urban areas, while 1.4% lived in rural areas.

Racial composition as of the 2020 census
| Race | Number | Percent |
|---|---|---|
| White | 52,577 | 83.7% |
| Black or African American | 1,724 | 2.7% |
| American Indian and Alaska Native | 541 | 0.9% |
| Asian | 649 | 1.0% |
| Native Hawaiian and Other Pacific Islander | 70 | 0.1% |
| Some other race | 2,932 | 4.7% |
| Two or more races | 4,306 | 6.9% |
| Hispanic or Latino (of any race) | 6,508 | 10.4% |

=== 2010 census ===
As of the 2010 census, there were 62,230 people, 24,793 households, and 15,528 families residing in the city. The population density was 1,518.8 inhabitants per square mile (586.4/km^{2}). There were 26,594 housing units at an average density of 649.1 inhabitants per square mile (250.6/km^{2}). The racial makeup of the city was 90.9% White, 1.9% African American, 0.6% Native American, 0.7% Asian, 3.6% from other races, and 2.4% from two or more races. Hispanic or Latino of any race were 8.5% of the population.

There were 24,793 households, of which 31.6% had children under the age of 18 living with them, 41.4% were married couples living together, 15.0% had a female householder with no husband present, 6.2% had a male householder with no wife present, and 37.4% were non-families. 30.0% of all households were made up of individuals, and 11.1% had someone living alone who was 65 years of age or older. The average household size was 2.43 and the average family size was 3.01.

The median age in the city was 35.9 years. 24.1% of residents were under the age of 18; 10.8% were between the ages of 18 and 24; 26.1% were from 25 to 44; 25.6% were from 45 to 64; and 13.5% were 65 years of age or older. The gender makeup of the city was 48.7% male and 51.3% female.

=== 2000 census ===
As of the 2000 census, there were 58,268 people, 22,889 households, and 15,083 families residing in the city. The population density was 1,558.7 inhabitants per square mile (601.8/km^{2}). There were 24,340 housing units at an average density of 651.1 inhabitants per square mile (251.4/km^{2}). The racial makeup of the city was 94.76% White, 1.05% Black or African American, 0.45% Native American, 0.59% Asian, 0.03% Pacific Islander, 1.81% from other races, and 1.31% from two or more races. Hispanic or Latino of any race were 4.45% of the population.

There were 22,889 households, out of which 31.6% had children under the age of 18 living with them, 46.7% were married couples living together, 14.3% had a female householder with no husband present, and 34.1% were non-families. 27.9% of all households were made up of individuals, and 10.6% had someone living alone who was 65 years of age or older. The average household size was 2.49 and the average family size was 3.03.

Age spread: 26.0% under the age of 18, 10.3% from 18 to 24, 29.7% from 25 to 44, 20.8% from 45 to 64, and 13.2% who were 65 years of age or older. The median age was 35 years. For every 100 females, there were 93.7 males. For every 100 females age 18 and over, there were 90.7 males.

The median income for a household in the city was $36,221, and the median income for a family was $42,715. Males had a median income of $30,828 versus $23,476 for females. The per capita income for the city was $18,143. About 8.2% of families and 10.3% of the population were below the poverty line, including 14.0% of those under age 18 and 6.9% of those age 65 or over.

== Economy ==
The liberalization of Iowa gambling laws was followed by the opening of The Bluffs Run Greyhound Park in 1986. By 2005, Council Bluffs was the 19th largest casino market in the United States, with revenue equaling nearly $434 million. Casinos include Ameristar Casino Council Bluffs, Harrah's Council Bluffs, and the Horseshoe Council Bluffs.

Council Bluffs industry includes "frozen foods, robotics, dairy products, plastics, railroading, electrical products, and pork and beef packaging" per the city's website. American Games (a manufacturer of lottery gaming products), Barton Solvents, Con-Agra, Grundorf, Katelman Foundry, Omaha Standard Palfinger (a truck body manufacturer established in 1926), Red Giant Oil, and Tyson Foods have manufacturing plants in the city.

Griffin Pipe Products, established in 1921, closed its plant employing about 250 people in March 2014, when it was bought by U.S. Pipe and Foundry, based in Birmingham, Alabama. Griffin Wheels, a part of American Steel Foundries, was one of the largest US manufacturers of iron railroad-car wheels until it switched to pipes in the 1960s.

Mid-American Energy built a new coal-fired plant in 2007; the billion dollar investment was the single largest private investment in Iowa's history up until then.

In 2007, Google began construction of a server farm on the former site of the Council Bluffs drive-in theater on Veterans Memorial Highway. This first phase, completed in 2009, was to create "200 high quality jobs". The second Google campus, on Bunge Avenue, had an open house in October 2013, employing 50 people who are "installing and upgrading Google servers and providing maintenance on equipment". In March 2014, a third phase, the Southlands expansion, was announced, creating 35 additional jobs and bringing Google's investment up to $1.5 billion, the largest private investment in Iowa's history to date. The state increased its tax abatement of sales and use tax for Google from $9.6 million to $16.8 million. As of July 2014 Google stated it created 130 jobs and as of June 2016 "over 300 jobs" on site. In particular, the server farms are backing the entire "us-central1" region of the Google Cloud Platform.

== Government ==
List of Mayors of Council Bluffs
  - Cornelius Voorhis, 1853
  - J. K. Cook, 1854
  - C. E. Stone, 1855
  - D. W. Price, 1856
  - J. Smith Hooton, 1857–1858
  - George Doughty, 1859
  - L. W. Babbitt, 1860–1861
  - J. M. Palmer, 1862–1863, 1865, 1870
  - N. S. Bates, 1864
  - Caleb Baldwin, 1866
  - Frank Street, 1867
  - Thomas Tostevin, 1868
  - D. C. Bloomer, 1871
  - N. D. Lawrence, 1872–1873, 1878, 1892–1893
  - W. C. James, 1874, 1880
  - C. B. Jacquemin, 1875
  - John H. Keatley, 1876
  - John T. Baldwin, 1877
  - Addison Cochran, 1879
  - W. R. Vaughan, 1881, 1884–1885
  - Thomas Bowman, 1882–1883
  - John Chapman, 1886
  - William Groneweg, 1887
  - M. F. Rohrer, 1887–1889
  - Donald Macrae, 1890–1891
  - J. H. Cleaver, 1894–1895
  - George Carson, 1896–1897
  - Victor Jennings, 1898–1901
  - Dell G. Morgan, 1902–1903
  - Donald Macrae Jr., 1904–1907
  - Thomas J. Maloney, 1908–1913
  - M. B. Snyder, 1914–1917
  - L. C. Zurmuehlen, c. 1918–1921
  - Hugh P. Finerty, c. 1935
  - George B. Sparks, c. 1950
  - Einer P. Juel, c. 1951
  - Marion L. Shugart, c. 1952
  - James F. Mulqueen, c. 1953
  - T. P. Schmidt, c. 1954
  - Noran Davis, c. 1960
  - Richard C. Oshlo, c. 1960
  - Leon E. Morse, c. 1962
  - Tom Hanafan, 1988–2013
  - Matt Walsh, 2014–2025
  - Jill Shudak, 2026–present

== Arts and culture ==
Council Bluffs is the location of the Pottawattamie County "Squirrel Cage" Jail, in use from 1885 until 1969, which is one of three remaining examples of a Rotary Jail. Listed on the National Register of Historic Places, it was built as a rotary jail with pie-shaped cells on a turntable. To access individual cells, the jailer turned a crank to rotate the cylinder until the desired cell lined up with a fixed opening on each floor. According to the Historical Society of Pottawattamie County, the Squirrel Cage Jail is the only three-story rotary jail constructed. Although the rotary mechanism was disabled in 1960, the building remained the county jail for another 9 years. Similar, smaller examples of the concept can be seen in Crawfordsville, Indiana and Gallatin, Missouri.

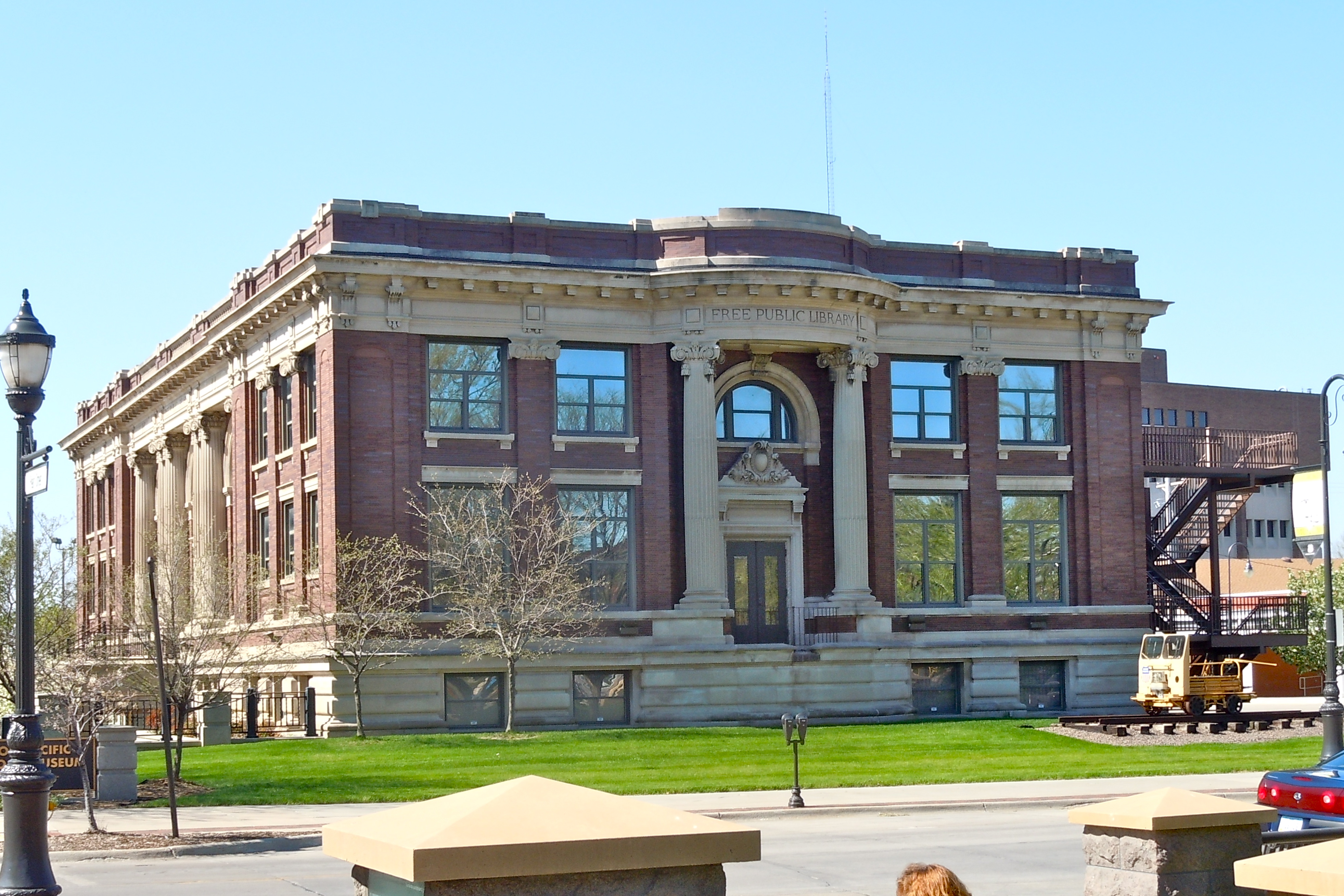
Union Pacific Railroad Museum in the former Carnegie Library which is in downtown Council Bluffs

The city's strong ties to the railroad industry are commemorated by three local museums. The Union Pacific Museum is located in the former Council Bluffs Free Public Library (a Carnegie library), at Pearl Street and Willow Avenue; the Grenville Dodge Home is on Third Street; and the RailsWest Railroad Museum is at South Main Street and Sixteenth Avenue. RailsWest is housed in an 1899 Chicago, Rock Island and Pacific Railroad passenger depot later shared with the Milwaukee Road, which was used by the Rocky Mountain Rocket, the Arrow, and the Midwest Hiawatha. RailsWest features an outdoor display of historic train cars, including a Railway Post Office car, two steam locomotives, two cabooses, a Burlington Lounge car, and a 1953 switcher produced by the Plymouth Locomotive Works.

The Iowa West Foundation, the charitable wing of the local gambling industry, funded a public art planning process for Council Bluffs in 2004 which emphasized a 2015 goal for the city to become "a prosperous urban area known for its cultural enlightenment and public art collection." To this end the city renovated Bayliss Park in downtown, which was re-dedicated in early 2007 with a new fountain dubbed Wellspring. Its performance pavilion, known as Oculus, was designed by sculptor Brower Hatcher. This was the first installation of the Iowa West Public Art, a foundation established during the Public Art Master Planning process. The Iowa West Foundation then established IWPA along with a public art website.

In 2008 a 50-foot (15 m)-tall Molecule Man sculpture by Jonathan Borofsky was installed at the Mid-America Center; nearby sculptures were designed by William King and Jun Kaneko. Albert Paley designed elements of the nearby South 24th Street bridge at Exit 1B of the combined Interstate 29 and Interstate 80 at Council Bluffs and Ed Carpenter designed Gateway for the West Broadway viaduct. Artist Dan Corson and the Big Mo by Mark di Suvero are featured at Tom Hanfan's River's Edge Park along the banks of the Missouri River.

Council Bluffs is also home to the Chanticleer Community Theater, TVI Filtration Corporation (a major supplier of discount automotive products), and Hamilton College (Iowa) which is now part of Kaplan University – Council Bluffs.

The black squirrel is the city's mascot. John James Audubon wrote about these squirrels in 1843, along the Missouri River at Council Bluffs.

For one week in late July/early August, the annual Pottawattamie County Fair is held at Westfair grounds. There are carnival rides, concerts, gun shows, tractor races, and a queen contest.

== Sports ==
The Iowa Blackhawks (later known as the Council Bluffs Express) of the American Professional Football League played at the Mid-America Center from 2004 until 2012. The Mid-America Center was also home to the Omaha Lancers from 2002 until 2008. Iowa Rampage Arena Football to kick-off in 2024 with relaunch of Arena Football League

Council Bluffs hosted two minor league baseball teams. The Council Bluffs Rails played in 1935 and were preceded by the 1903 Council Bluffs Bluffers. The Bluffers played as members of the Class D level Iowa-South Dakota League in 1903 and the 1935 Rails were members of the Class A level Western League. The teams hosted minor league home games at Broadway Park in 1935 and the Lake Manawa Ballpark in 1903.

== Education ==
Public education in the city of Council Bluffs is provided by two school districts: Council Bluffs Community School District and Lewis Central Community School District. Most of the city is located within the Council Bluffs Community School District which operates these public schools: 10 elementary schools, two middle schools, two high schools (Abraham Lincoln and Thomas Jefferson), Tucker Career & College Center, Anne E. Nelson Early Learning Center, and Kanesville Alternative Learning Center. As of the 2008–2009 school year, the district had a total enrollment of 9,246. The Lewis Central Community School District (one high school, one middle school, and two elementary schools) serves the southern portion of Council Bluffs and enrolled 3,047 students as of the 2008–2009 school year.

There are several private schools in Council Bluffs including Community Christian School, Heartland Christian School, Liberty Christian School, Saint Albert Catholic Schools (of the Roman Catholic Diocese of Des Moines), and Trinity Lutheran Interparish School.

The Iowa School for the Deaf moved to the south edge of Council Bluffs in 1870 along what is now Iowa Highway 92. It is open to all students in both Iowa and Nebraska who are younger than 21 and whose hearing loss places them at a disadvantage in the public schools.

Iowa Western Community College is located on the eastern edge of Council Bluffs near the intersection of Interstate 80 and U.S. Route 6 and is the home of the radio station KIWR. Buena Vista University also has a location in Council Bluffs and partners with Iowa Western Community College to offer bachelor's degree completion programs to IWCC graduates.

== Transportation ==
The city is well served by Interstate 80, Interstate 29, U.S. Route 6, and the Loess Hills National Scenic Byway. The Union Pacific, BNSF, Iowa Interstate, and Canadian National Railroads all connect in Council Bluffs and carry important freight traffic. MidAmerican Energy has a large coal-burning power plant near the southern city limits.

An extensive system of off-street paved trails aids in walking and bicycling around the city, including the currently under construction FIRST AVE trail spanning the city's West End. Walking, bicycling, and other active transportation access across the Missouri River into Omaha currently exists at two points: the Bob Kerrey Pedestrian Bridge and a trail connection across the South Omaha Veterans Memorial Bridge on US-275.

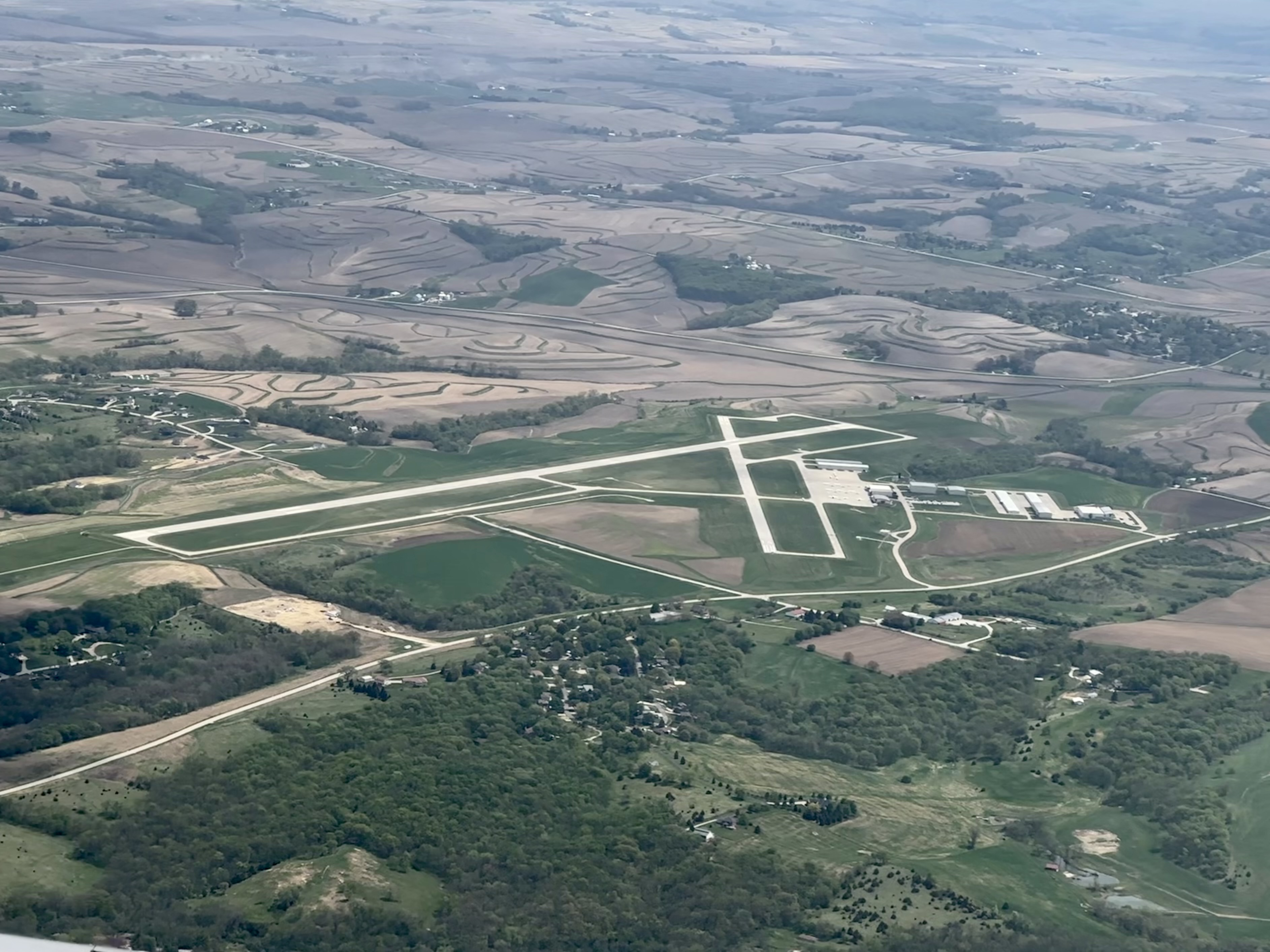
Airfield at Council Bluffs Iowa

Transit access around Council Bluffs is available via two Metro bus lines, the blue and yellow routes. Each route originates in downtown Omaha and provides access across the Missouri River as well as between various points around Council Bluffs. According to city plans it is possible that a streetcar line may be constructed along the First Avenue right-of-way. The streetcar line would terminate near Methodist Jennie Edmundson Hospital in the east and in downtown Omaha in the west; it would have a connection to the planned Omaha Streetcar. In order to facilitate streetcar access across the Missouri River, plans call for a new multimodal bridge to be constructed just south of the existing I-480 bridge. The multimodal bridge would be built approximately where the Ak-Sar-Ben Bridge once stood and carry multimodal traffic between Council Bluffs and Omaha.

Commercial air travel for Council Bluffs occurs primarily out of Omaha's Eppley Airfield. The Council Bluffs Municipal Airport also serves the general aviation needs of Council Bluffs and surrounding areas.

== Notable people ==
=== Academics ===
- Nathan M. Pusey: educator and former president of Harvard University

=== Arts ===
- Walter Cassel: opera singer
- Janet Dailey, romance novelist
- John Durbin: actor
- Addison Farmer: jazz musician
- Art Farmer: jazz musician
- Louise Fitch (1914–1996): actress
- Joan Freeman: actress, co-starred with Elvis Presley in Roustabout
- Peg Hillias: actress
- Harry Langdon: silent movie comedy actor
- Sagan Lewis: actress (St. Elsewhere)
- James Millhollin: character actor
- Lula Greene Richards: poet
- Charles Roscoe Savage: photographer
- Ernest Schoedsack: film director, including the original King Kong and Mighty Joe Young
- David Yost: actor

=== Business ===
- Abraham Harry Blank (1879–1971), founder of the Central States Theater Corporation and a major philanthropist
- Jonathan Browning: gunsmith
- Martin Burns: championship wrestler, founder of mail-order "Farmer Burns Scientific School of Wrestling"
- Millard Seldin (1926–2020), real estate developer, banker, basketball investor, and horsebreeder.

=== Journalism ===
- William Pfaff: journalist
- Jack Lawrence Treynor (February 21, 1930 – May 11, 2016): editor of Financial Analysts Journal

=== Military ===
- Richard M. Baughn: Air Force brigadier general and commander of the 20th Fighter Wing
- Frank F. Everest: Air Force general and Commander in Europe during the Cold War
- John S. McCain Jr.: Navy Admiral, father of U.S. Senator and presidential candidate John S. McCain III
- Raymond R. Wright: Marine Corps General during World War II

=== Politics ===
- Amelia Bloomer (1818–1894): 19th century suffragist
- Thomas Bowman: businessman and U.S. Congressman
- Sam Brown: organizer Moratorium to End the War in Vietnam, former Colorado state treasurer
- Archibald Bryant: Democrat member of the Iowa House of Representatives
- Grenville Dodge: U.S. Congressman, Civil War general, chief engineer of the Union Pacific during construction of the transcontinental railroad
- Michael Gronstal: former Minority Leader, present Majority Leader Iowa Senate
- Septimus J. Hanna (1845–1921): Christian Scientist, appointed judge of County Court (then in Council Bluffs) at age 23
- Clem F. Kimball: Lieutenant Governor of Iowa
- Marquis Lafayette McPherson (1822–1871), member of the Iowa Senate
- Joseph Lyman: Civil War soldier, lawyer, judge, U.S. Congressman
- Henry C. Mollett: Iowa state representative
- William Henry Mills Pusey: State Senator and U.S. Congressman
- Josh Turek: State Representative, and U.S. Senator
- Coleen Seng: former Mayor of Lincoln, Nebraska
- Walter I. Smith: Circuit Court Judge and U.S. Congressman

=== Religion ===
- Gladden Bishop: contender for the presidency of the Church of Jesus Christ of Latter Day Saints after Joseph Smith's death on June 27, 1844.
- Phineas F. Bresee (1838–1915): founder of the Church of the Nazarene
- Pierre-Jean De Smet: Jesuit missionary
- Arnold Potter: leader of an LDS splinter group and self-proclaimed Messiah

=== Science and engineering ===
- Lee De Forest: inventor, the "Grandfather of Television"
- William H. Folsom: architect
- J. Chris Jensen: architect
- Hans Schlegel: astronaut

=== Sports ===
- Stan Bahnsen: pitcher for six Major League Baseball teams
- Don Chandler: NFL football player
- Zoe Ann Olsen-Jensen: diver, 1948 Summer Olympics silver medalist, 1952 Summer Olympics bronze medalist
- Ben Leber: professional football player
- Jon Lieber: professional baseball player
- Carlos Martinez: professional football player
- Ted Monachino: outside linebackers coach for the Atlanta Falcons
- Brian O'Connor: National Championship-winning baseball coach at the University of Virginia; current head coach of Mississippi State
- Bob Smith: football player
- Jerry Smith: professional golfer
- William Smith: Olympic gold medalist in wrestling at 1952 Summer Olympics
- Ron Stander: boxer, the "Bluffs Butcher" who fought Joe Frazier in 1972 for the heavyweight title
- Joshua Turek (born April 12, 1979) is an American wheelchair basketball player and a member of the United States men's national wheelchair basketball team.
- Jake Waters: football player
- Max Duggan: football player and 2022 Heisman Trophy Finalist
- Cole Jensen, soccer player in Major League Soccer
- Josh Dix: professional basketball player

=== Other ===
- Robert Ben Rhoades: serial killer
- Sauganash or Billy Caldwell: Potawatomi spokesman, son of William Caldwell
- Marjabelle Young Stewart: etiquette expert
- Watseka: niece of Potawatomi Chief, married to Gurdon Saltonstall Hubbard and Noel Le Vasseur
- Farrah Abraham: reality television star, known for MTV's 16 And Pregnant

== Sister cities ==
Council Bluffs' sister cities are:

- El Hajeb, Morocco
- Herat, Afghanistan
- Kandahar, Afghanistan
- Karrada (Baghdad), Iraq
- Prizren, Kosovo
- Tobolsk, Russia

== See also ==
- Fort Atkinson (Nebraska) - describes 1820s United States Army outpost
- History of Omaha
- Mormon Trail
- Route of the Oregon Trail
- Winter Quarters, Nebraska
- Death of Larry Murillo-Moncada
