= Aime Wichtendahl =

American politician (born c. 1979)

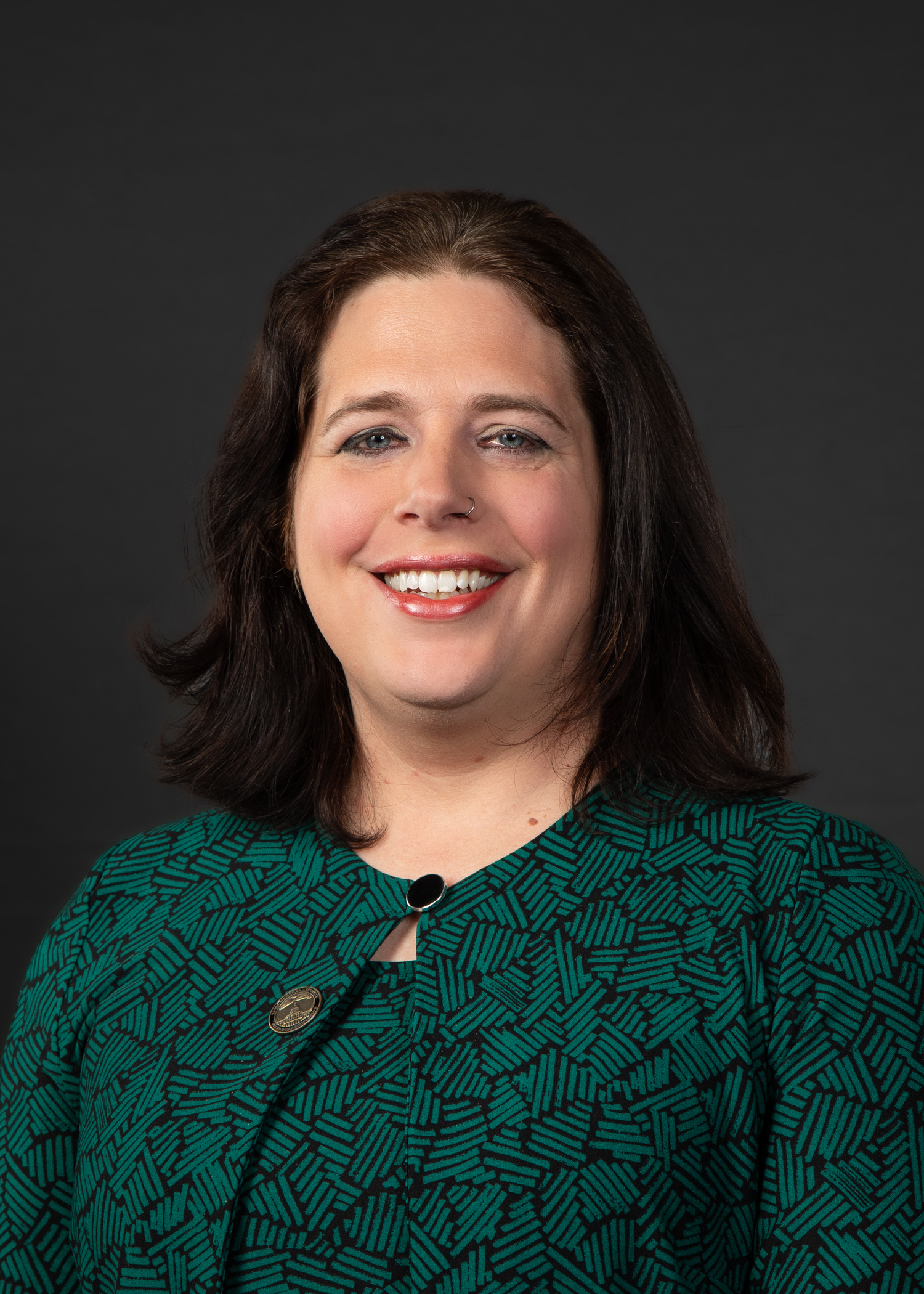
- Official portrait, 2025

Member of the Iowa House of Representatives from the 80th district
- Incumbent
- Assumed office January 13, 2025
- Preceded by: Art Staed

Member of the Hiawatha City Council
- In office January 1, 2016 – December 31, 2024

Personal details
- Born: 1979 or 1980 (age 46) Saint Paul, Minnesota, U.S.
- Party: Democratic
- Education: Kirkwood Community College; Mount Mercy University (BA)

Aime J. Wichtendahl is an American politician. In 2024, Wichtendahl became the first transgender person elected to the Iowa General Assembly, representing House District 80 in the Cedar Rapids area. She is also the first transgender woman to be elected to public office in Iowa. She was first elected to Hiawatha's City Council in 2015, a seat to which she was re-elected twice in 2019 and 2023. She is a member of the Democratic Party.

== Personal life ==
Aime was born in Minnesota. She then moved to Newhall, Iowa. She attended Kirkwood Community College and Mount Mercy College (now University) in Cedar Rapids where she graduated with a B.A. in journalism and political science in 2005. Wichtendahl began her transition at the age of twenty-five, the same year she graduated from Mount Mercy. She moved to Hiawatha, Iowa in 2007.

== Political life ==
Aime Wichtendahl was nominated for Hiawatha City Council in 2015. Her campaign slogan that year was "Stand with Local Businesses," as she focused on further developing local businesses in the community. Out of five candidates, Wichtendahl, Dick Olson, and Dennis Norton won the City Council election in 2015. Wichtendahl made history by becoming the first transgender woman elected to Iowa's government. She ran for a second term in 2019 and a third in 2023. She was set to hold the seat until 2027 before her run for state legislature.

On November 5, 2024, Wichtendahl won her campaign for Iowa House District 80, becoming the first transgender person elected to the Iowa legislature. She is an advocate for transgender and LGBTQIA+ rights, green energy, and small businesses.

=== Committee assignments ===
- Economic Growth and Technology (ranking member)
- Judiciary
- Local Government
- Veterans Affairs
- Ways and Means

== See also ==
- List of transgender public officeholders in the United States
