= Henry C. Mollett =

American politician (1938–2024)

Member of the Iowa House of Representatives from the 80th district
- In office 1971–1973
- Preceded by: A. Gordon Stokes
- Succeeded by: Emma Jean Kiser

Personal details
- Born: Henry Charles Mollett; March 29, 1938 Kansas City, Kansas, U.S.
- Died: December 5, 2024 (aged 86) Council Bluffs, Iowa, U.S.
- Party: Republican
- Education: University of Nebraska Omaha; Riders College

Henry Charles Mollett (March 29, 1938 – December 5, 2024) was an American politician. A member of the Republican Party, he served in the Iowa House of Representatives from 1971 to 1973.

== Life and career ==
Mollett was born in Kansas City, Kansas, the son of David Mollett and Mary Sutton. He attended the University of Nebraska Omaha and Riders College. He worked as a businessman.

Mollett served in the Iowa House of Representatives from 1971 to 1973.

== Death ==
Mollett died on December 5, 2024, in Council Bluffs, Iowa, at the age of 86.
