= Grundorf =

American audio equipment manufacturer

Coordinates: 41.253276°N 95.855599°W

Grundorf Corporation Grund Audio Design (GAD)
- Company type: Pro Audio and Cases Manufacturer
- Industry: Audio
- Founded: 1984
- Founder: Frank Grund
- Headquarters: Council Bluffs, Iowa, United States
- Products: Loudspeakers
- Website: www.grundorf.com

Grundorf Corporation is an American loudspeaker manufacturer / road case company headquartered in Council Bluffs, Iowa, US.

== History ==
Grundorf Corporation was formed in 1984 to manufacture and repair audio equipment for regional and touring musicians. As the business grew, audio companies such as Celestion began using Grundorf to design and build their systems.

As Grundorf continued its focus on Protective Case sales, a growing demand from touring groups like Mannheim Steamroller for sophisticated, application-specific audio systems kept the company occupied.

Eventually, two complementary divisions were formed: Grund Audio Design and Grundorf Case and Accessory.

Grund Audio Design Division GAD audio engineers use multiple techniques including LEAP, LMS, Thiele/Small parameters and industry audiophiles for critical listening tests. GAD systems employ materials including asymmetrical horns; Neodymium magnets; Titanium drivers; full-protection circuitry; Baltic Birch wood and third-order crossover networks to precisely match transition between drivers.

Grundorf Case and Accessory Division Grundorf Cases are built for applications where portability and mobility are of prime importance. Their designs are used in educational facilities, corporate A/V, lighting, musicians, rental, DJ and “Pro-Audio” production companies.
