= Richard M. Baughn =

United States Air Force brigadier general

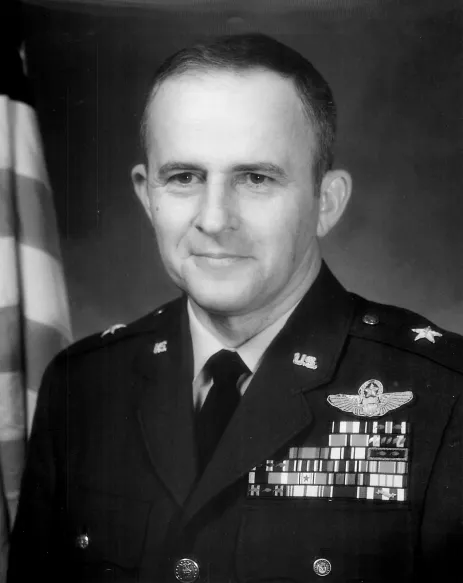
- Born: September 26, 1923 (age 102); Council Bluffs, Iowa, U.S.
- Allegiance: United States of America
- Branch: United States Air Force
- Service years: 1942–1975
- Rank: Brigadier general
- Conflicts: World War II; Korean War; Vietnam War
- Spouse: Mary Pat Collins (died 2021)

Richard M. Baughn (born September 26, 1923) is a retired United States Air Force brigadier general.

== Life and career ==
Baughn was born in Council Bluffs, Iowa. He attended and graduated from Abraham Lincoln High School. After graduating, he attended Creighton University. He served in the United States Army Air Forces during World War II. He also served in the United States Air Force during the Korean War and the Vietnam War. According to Tennis View Magazine, he was a decorated fighter pilot. In 1970, he earned his bachelor of science degree from the University of Maryland, College Park.

Baughn was commander of the 20th Tactical Fighter Wing in the Royal Air Force in the early 1970s. In February 1972, he was nominated to become brigadier general in the United States Air Force. In ten months, he was promoted. In 1974, he was appointed as deputy defense attache of the Defense Attaché Office, Saigon.

== Personal life ==
Baughn was married to Mary Pat Collins. Their marriage lasted until her death in 2021.

On September 26, 2023, Baughn turned 100. On his 101st birthday, he rode a Fairchild PT-19 as a gift. According to CBS News, he is a tennis player.
