= Death of Larry Murillo-Moncada =

Missing man whose body was found in 2019

Disappearance of Larry Ely Murillo-Moncada
- Date: November 28, 2009 – January 24, 2019
- Location: Council Bluffs, Iowa, USA
- Outcome: Body discovered behind supermarket cooler almost 10 years after disappearance

Larry Ely Murillo-Moncada was a 25-year-old Honduran man who disappeared in Council Bluffs, Iowa, United States in November 2009. He was considered a missing person for almost 10 years before his body was discovered in January 2019 by workers dismantling the refrigerators of a supermarket where Murillo-Moncada had been employed. It was found that he died after becoming trapped behind a 12-foot-high (3.7 m) refrigerator unit.

== Disappearance ==
At 6:15 pm on November 28, 2009, Larry Ely Murillo-Moncada fled his parents' house in Council Bluffs, Iowa, during a blizzard while reportedly suffering from hallucinations. He was barefoot, wearing only a navy blue hoodie and light blue pants, and did not take his keys or his car. His mother said that he was hearing voices telling him to eat sugar, and believed that his heart was beating too hard and that eating sugar would stop it from beating so hard.

At the time of his disappearance, Murillo-Moncada was an employee of a local branch of the No Frills supermarket chain, which was located less than a mile (1.6 km) from his home, although he was not scheduled to work on the day that he disappeared. His mother, Ana, said that the day before he disappeared he had returned home from working a Thanksgiving shift and seemed disoriented. His parents also said that they believed he was off his prescription medication, which was causing him to act irrationally. Murillo-Moncada's father, Victor Murillo, said that he and his wife, along with friends, had searched for their son the morning after his disappearance but had found no evidence of his whereabouts.

== Discovery ==
Murillo-Moncada's body was discovered on the morning of January 24, 2019, by contractors removing the freezer units in the former No Frills store, which had been vacant since 2016. The remains were identified as Murillo-Moncada in July, 6 months after they were discovered. The blue clothing found on the body also matched the description of what he was wearing on the day that he disappeared.

An investigation into his death concluded that he had climbed on top of the refrigerator units before falling sideways into the 18-inch (46 cm) gap between the wall and the back of the coolers, where he became trapped at the bottom of the 12-foot-high (3.7 m) drop. The noise of the refrigerator units also made it unlikely that anyone would have heard any cries for help. Former employees also said that it was not unusual for people to be in the area on top of the coolers, which was used for storage, and many employees used the area to take unofficial breaks. It was also not uncommon for employees to enter and exit the store even when they were not on their shifts. The cooler was located in a back room of the store and was not in public view.

Officials do not know how any odors emanating from his decomposing remains went unnoticed for years.

Sergeant Brandon Danielson, who had been assigned to investigate Murillo-Moncada's disappearance in 2009, said that his mother had long suspected that he did not leave the store on the day he went missing. Police had contacted other law enforcement agencies, including Immigration and Customs Enforcement, as Murillo-Moncada had previously been deported to Honduras before returning to the United States. During the initial investigation in 2009, police had also visited the No Frills store where Murillo-Moncada's body lay undiscovered, but had left without further investigation after his boss told them that he had not seen him and he was not scheduled to work that day.
