= Archibald Bryant =

American politician

Archibald S. Bryant

Member of the Iowa House of Representatives from the 12th district
- In office December 6, 1852 – December 3, 1854

Personal details
- Born: July 1, 1803 Powhatan County, Virginia, US
- Died: March 29, 1883 (aged 79) Council Bluffs, Iowa, US
- Party: Democratic

Archibald S. Bryant (July 1, 1803 – March 29, 1883) was an American politician, serving as a member of the Iowa House of Representatives from Council Bluffs, Iowa.

== Early life ==
Bryant was born in Powhatan County, Virginia. In his late 20s, he moved to Kentucky. In 1831, he married P. G. Montgomery.

== Career ==
After moving to Missouri, he was elected County Judge in Putnam County in 1949. In 1852, he moved to Council Bluffs, that same year being elected as a Democrat to the state legislature, where he represented western Iowa from 1852 to 1854. He was also involved in real estate.

== Later life ==
He continued to live in Council Bluffs, where he died on March 29, 1883.
