= Holly Brink =

American politician (born 1982)

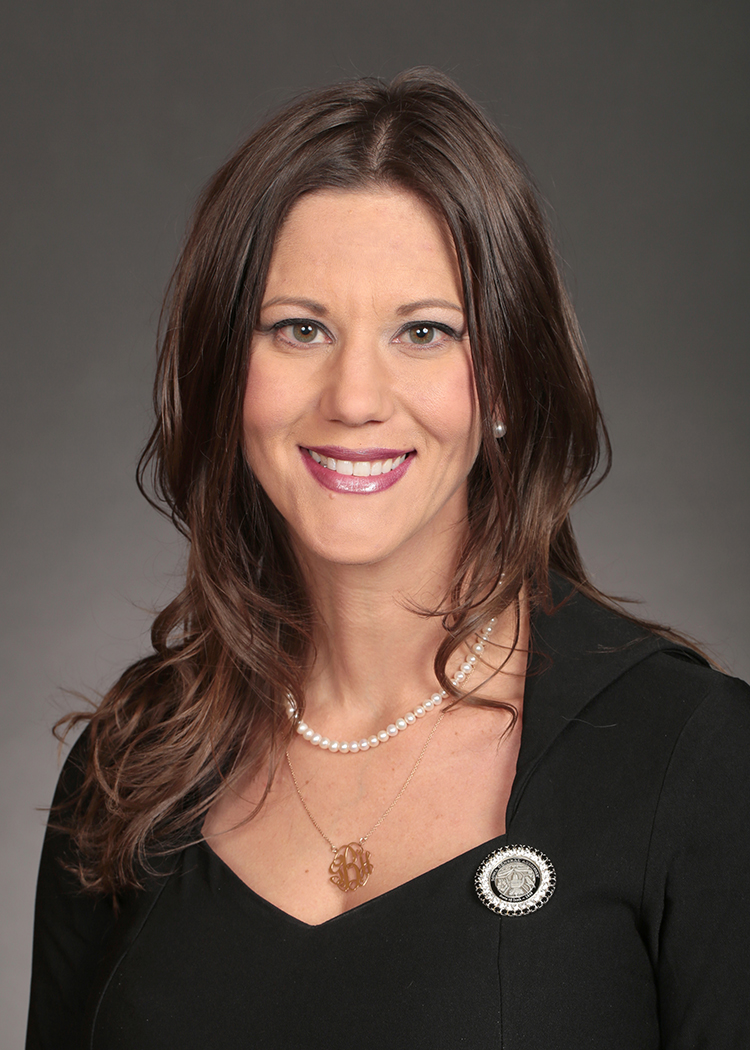

Member of the Iowa House of Representatives from the 80th district
- In office January 14, 2019 – January 9, 2023
- Preceded by: Larry Sheets
- Succeeded by: Art Staed (redistricting)

Personal details
- Born: Holly Ann Hynick; July 18, 1982 (age 44) Keokuk County, Iowa, U.S.
- Party: Republican
- Spouse: Adam Brink
- Children: 3
- Education: William Penn University (B.A.)
- Occupation: Aflac (District Sales Coordinator)

Holly Ann Brink (née Hynick; born July 18, 1982), is an American politician from the state of Iowa.

Brink was born in Keokuk County, Iowa in 1982. She resides with her family in Oskaloosa, Iowa.

Brink announced in December 2021 that she would not seek re-election following the completion of her term.

== Electoral history ==
*incumbent

=== 2018 ===
Election	Political result	Candidate	Party	Votes	%
Iowa House primary elections, 2018; District 80	Republican	Holly Brink	Republican	934	54.1
Iowa House primary elections, 2018; District 80	Republican	Richard Keilig Jr.	Republican	791	45.9
Iowa House general election, 2018; District 80	Republican	Holly Brink	Republican	7,625	63.44
Iowa House general election, 2018; District 80	Republican	Susan McDanel	Democratic	4,383	36.46

=== 2020 ===
Election	Political result	Candidate	Party	Votes	%
Iowa House primary elections, 2020; District 80	Republican	Holly Brink	Republican	2,334	99.7
Iowa House primary elections, 2020; District 80	Republican	Write-ins	Republican	8	0.3
Iowa House general election, 2020; District 80	Republican	Holly Brink	Republican	12,113	98.73
Iowa House general election, 2020; District 80	Republican	Write-ins	Democratic	157	1.27

Iowa House of Representatives
Preceded by Larry Sheets	80th district 2019–2023	Succeeded by Art Staed
