= Council Bluffs Municipal Airport =

Airport in Iowa, United States

- IATA: CBF; ICAO: KCBF; FAA LID: CBF

Summary
- Airport type: Public
- Owner: Council Bluffs Airport Authority
- Serves: Council Bluffs, Iowa
- Elevation AMSL: 1,245 ft (379 m)
- Coordinates: 41°15′36″N 095°45′31″W
- Website: www.cbairport.com

Map
- Location of airport in Iowa/United States CBF (the United States)

Runways
Direction	Length		Surface
Direction	ft	m	Surface
18/36	5,500	1,676	Concrete
14/32	3,650	1,113	Concrete

Statistics (2012)
- Aircraft operations: 40,050
- Based aircraft: 83
- Source: Federal Aviation Administration

Council Bluffs Municipal Airport (IATA: CBF, ICAO: KCBF, FAA LID: CBF) is a public use airport located four nautical miles (5 mi, 7 km) east of the central business district of Council Bluffs, a city in Pottawattamie County, Iowa, United States. It is owned by Council Bluffs Airport Authority. This airport is included in the National Plan of Integrated Airport Systems for 2011–2015, which categorized it as a general aviation facility.

Flight school and air charter company Advanced Air Inc. operates out of this airport. The airport is also the site of Iowa Western Community College's Aviation Maintenance Technology program, and their Professional Pilot training program.

The airport has many instrument approaches, including an ILS to Runway 36, and a VOR-A approach that are both used regularly for training.

== Facilities and aircraft ==
Council Bluffs Municipal Airport covers an area of 656 acres (265 ha) at an elevation of 1,245 feet (379 m) above mean sea level. It has two runways with concrete surfaces: 18/36 is 5,500 by 100 feet (1,676 x 30 m) and 14/32 is 3,650 by 60 feet (1,113 x 18 m).

For the 12-month period ending March 22, 2012, the airport had 40,050 aircraft operations, an average of 109 per day: 96% general aviation, 4% air taxi, and <1% military. At that time there were 83 aircraft based at this airport: 63% single-engine, 14.5% multi-engine, 8% jet, and 14.5% helicopter.

== See also ==
- List of airports in Iowa
