= Mall of the Bluffs =

- Location: Council Bluffs, Iowa, U.S.
- Coordinates: 41.245409°N 95.823204°W
- Address: 1751 Madison Avenue
- Opened: 1986
- Closed: December 30, 2019
- Developer: General Growth Properties
- Owner: Menards
- Num. of anchor tenants: 4 (all vacant)
- Floor area: 730,000 square feet (68,000 m^{2})
- Floors: 1
- Public transit: Metro Transit

Mall of the Bluffs was a shopping mall in Council Bluffs, Iowa, United States. Built in 1986, the mall featured J. C. Penney, Dillard's, Sears, and Target as its anchor stores at its peak. After both JCPenney and Target moved to other developments in Council Bluffs, it began a sharp decline in tenancy throughout the 2010s. The mall closed on December 30, 2019, and demolition began one year later.

== History ==
Mall of the Bluffs opened in 1986. Developed by General Growth Properties, it was the second mall in the Council Bluffs area after Midlands Mall, which was located downtown, closed in 1992, and which was redeveloped after Mall of the Bluffs opened. It received two expansions in its history: Dillard's in 1988, and Sears a decade afterward.

The mall began losing anchor stores in the 21st century. J. C. Penney moved in 2008, and Target one year later. Barnes & Noble, another major tenant, closed in 2011. One year later, Sears closed as well.

General Growth Properties sold the mall to Namdar Realty Group in 2013. At the time of the sale, the mall was nearly 25 percent vacant. Many inline tenants had closed or relocated following the relocation of both J. C. Penney and Target, creating further vacancy issues throughout; despite this, Planet Fitness replaced Barnes & Noble shortly after the purchase by Namdar. Due to the increasing vacancy, the mall was put up for auction in 2015.

In 2018, the former J. C. Penney became an overstock store called It's $5. Council Bluffs Community School District purchased the former Target building in 2019 and began using it as a temporary relocation of two local middle schools which would be undergoing renovation. The last anchor store, Dillard's, also closed in 2019. For many years prior to its closure, the store had been downgraded to an outlet store.

Home improvement chain Menards purchased the mall at the end of 2019. At this point, the few remaining mall tenants were given eviction notices, and the mall closed on December 31. Menards officially opened August 15th, 2023, 4 years after the mall closure.
