= Iowa's 80th House of Representatives district =

American legislative district

House District 80
- Type: District of the Lower house
- Location: Iowa
- Representative: Aime Wichtendahl
- Parent organization: Iowa General Assembly

The 80th District of the Iowa House of Representatives in the state of Iowa. It is currently composed of part of Linn County.

== Current elected officials ==
Aime Wichtendahl is the representative currently representing the district.

== Past representatives ==
The district has previously been represented by:

- Henry C. Mollett, 1971–1973
- Emma Jean Kiser, 1973–1975
- Robert F. Bina, 1975–1981
- James B. Clements, 1981–1983
- Jack E. Woods, 1983–1987
- Tony Bisignano, 1987–1993
- Michael K. Peterson, 1993–1995
- James Drees, 1995–2001
- Rod Roberts, 2001–2003
- James F. Hahn, 2003–2005
- Nathan Reichert, 2005–2011
- Mark Lofgren, 2011–2013
- Larry Sheets, 2013–2019
- Holly Brink, 2019–2023
- Art Staed, 2023–2025
- Aime Wichtendahl, 2025–Present
