= Haymarket Commercial Historic District =

Historic district in Iowa, United States

- U.S. National Register of Historic Places
- U.S. Historic district
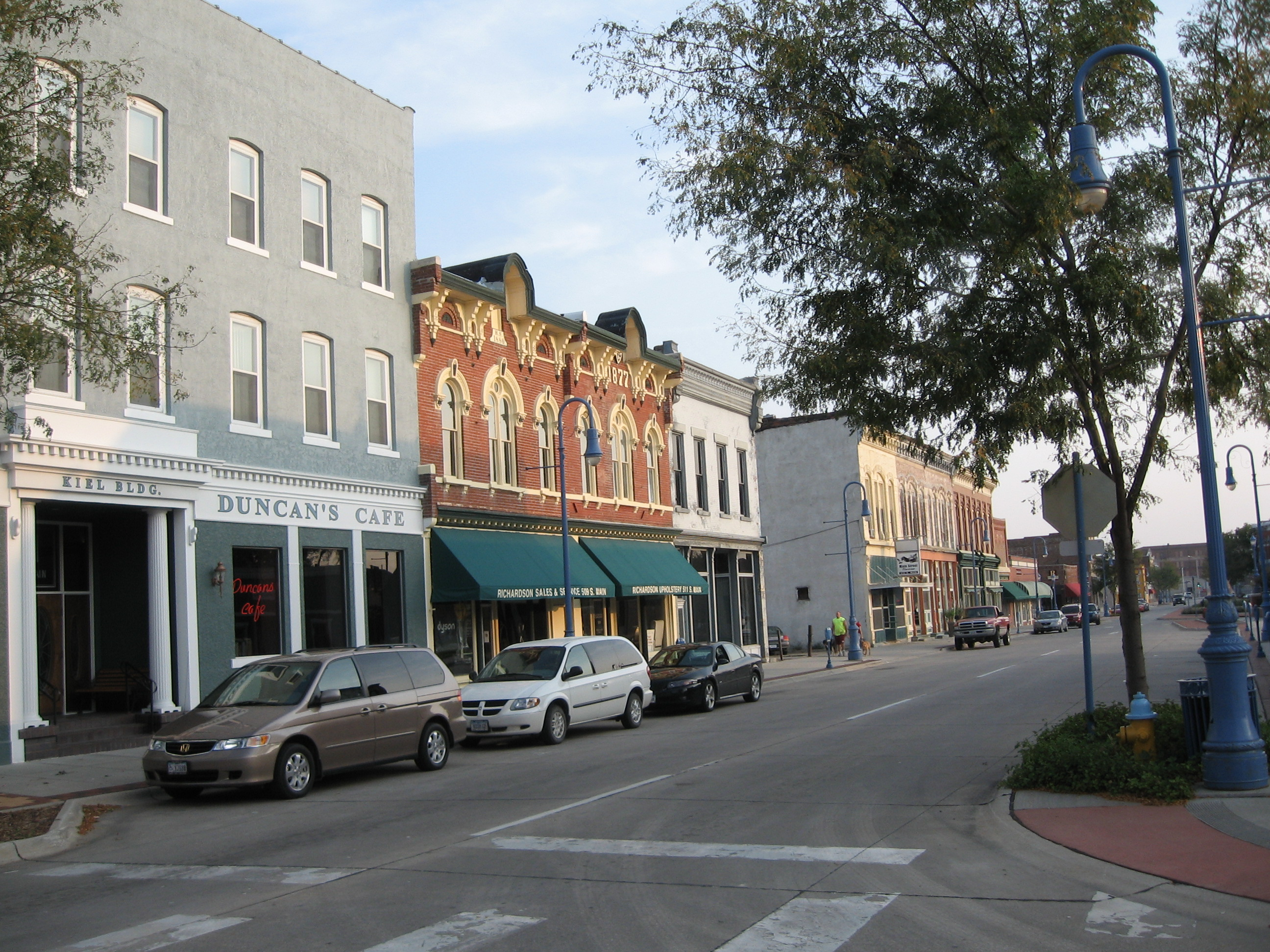

- Location within Iowa Location within the United States
- Location: S. Main St. Council Bluffs, Iowa
- Coordinates: 41°15′22″N 95°51′03.6″W
- Area: 17.6 acres (7.1 ha)
- NRHP reference No.: 85000774
- Added to NRHP: April 11, 1985

The Haymarket Commercial Historic District is a nationally recognized historic district located in Council Bluffs, Iowa, United States. It was listed on the National Register of Historic Places in 1985. At the time of its nomination the district consisted of 28 resources, including 19 contributing buildings, and nine non-contributing buildings. "Haymarket" is the forked-junction of Main and Pearl Streets where the city's scales were located in the 1890s. It is on the south side of the central business district. Council Bluffs was founded in the late 1840s as Kanesville by Mormons. When Brigham Young called all people of the faith outside of Utah to Salt Lake City in 1852, the community ceased to be majority Mormon. It was renamed Council Bluffs in 1853. The buildings here are among the earliest extant commercial buildings in the city.

The district developed between 1865 and 1930. The buildings were built in three periods:1865-1880, 1880–1900, and 1900–1930. They are two-story, brick, vernacular commercial structures. The first floors are commercial spaces with cast-iron storefronts, and the buildings are capped with metal cornices. The more elaborate decorative details are found on the buildings that were built in the 1880s and the 1890s. The simplest buildings are the oldest. The buildings north of the Main Street/Pearl Street intersection have primary facades on both streets.
