= Larry Sheets (politician) =

Iowa State Representative

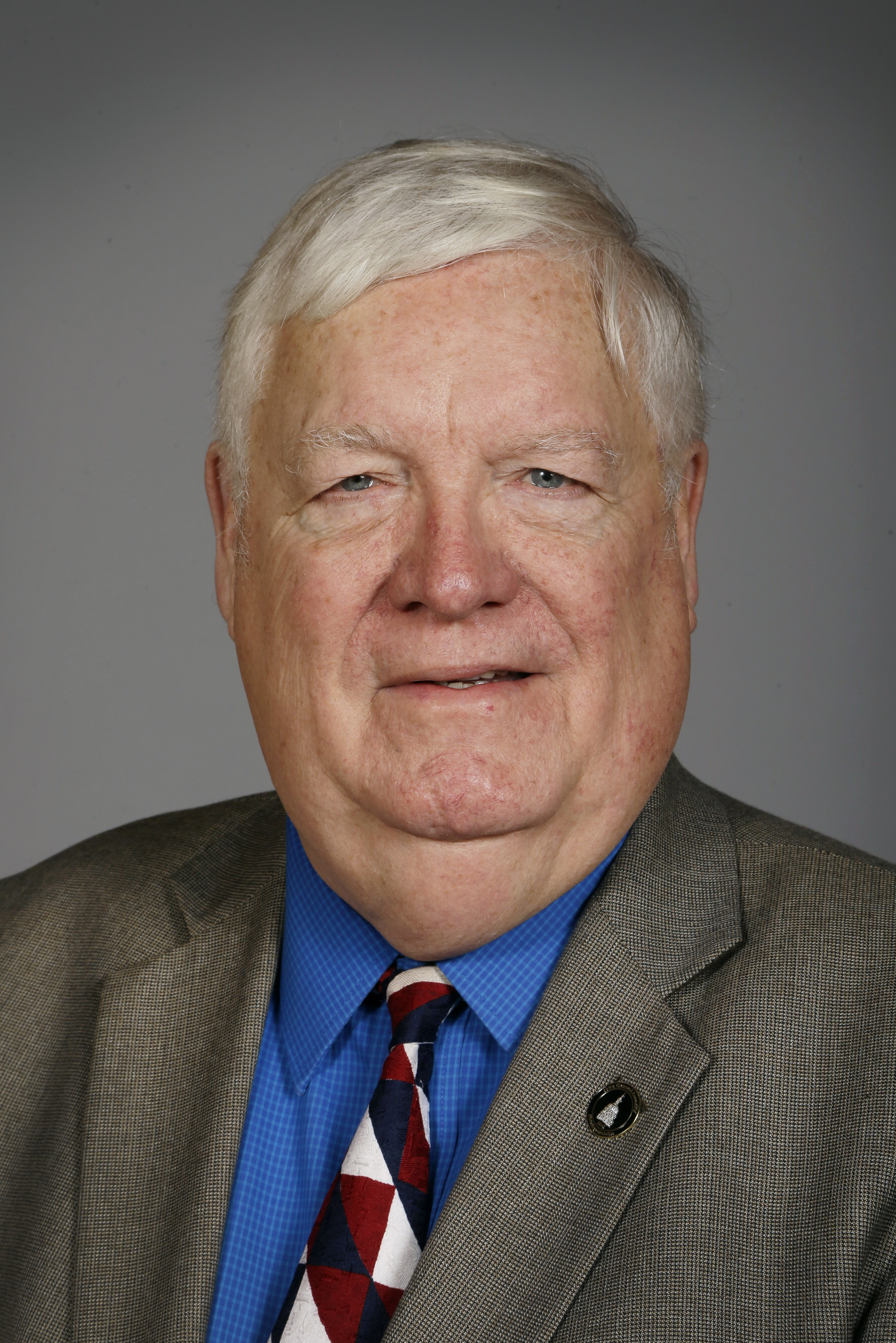
- 85th General Assembly portrait (2013)

Member of the Iowa House of Representatives from the 80th district
- In office January 14, 2013 – January 14, 2019
- Preceded by: Mark Lofgren
- Succeeded by: Holly Brink

Personal details
- Born: May 11, 1943 (age 83) Hammond, Indiana, U.S.
- Party: Republican
- Spouse: Carol
- Children: 10
- Profession: Engineer, farmer

Larry Sheets (born May 11, 1943) is an American politician who represented Iowa's 80th district in the Iowa House of Representatives. A Republican, he served from 2013 to 2019.

Iowa House of Representatives
Preceded by Mark Lofgren	80th district 2013–2019	Succeeded by Holly Brink
