= Ed Carpenter (artist) =

American artist

- Born: 1946 (age 79–80); Los Angeles
- Education: University of California, Berkeley
- Known for: Public art sculpture and infrastructure design

Ed Carpenter (born 1946) is an artist specializing in large-scale public sculptures made of a variety of materials, including glass. His work can be found globally in conference centers, libraries, and airports.

== Biography ==
Carpenter attended the University of California, Santa Barbara from 1965–1966, and Berkeley from 1968–1971. He studied architectural stained glass design with artists such as Ludwig Schaffrath in Germany and England from 1973 to 1975.

Carpenter works from his studio in Portland, Oregon.

== Works ==
Carpenter's large-scale public art installations can be found in interior and exterior locations such as airports, arenas, and plazas. He specializes in public art commissions, corporate commissions, and ecclesiastical clients. Below is a partial list of completed projects.

=== Bridge and exterior ===
- 2021 Love Field Airport Entrance, Dallas, TX. Exterior Sculpture 90'x20'x25'
- 2019 Barbara Walker Pedestrian Bridge, Wildwood Trail. Portland, OR. 180'x12'x8'
- 2016
- 2016 Taichung New City Park, Taichung, Taiwan. Exterior Sculpture 72'x20'
- 2008 Fred Hutchinson Cancer Research Center, Seattle, WA. Plaza Sculpture 60'x39'x39'
- 2005 John A. Burns School of Medicine, Honolulu, HI. Exterior Sculpture, 72'x143'x31'

=== Interior ===
- 2015 Wichita Airport, Wichita, KS, Interior Sculpture 64'x360'x25'
- 2006 Sky Harbor, Phoenix, AZ, Design consultant for $250 million airport facility, 800'x25' art wall and multiple skylights, sizes vary
- 2004 U.S. Courthouse, Seattle, WA, Interior Sculpture 55'x98'x26'
- 1999 Hokkaido Sports Center, Sapporo, Japan. Entry pavilion sculpture, 52'x49'
- 1993 Federal Building, Oakland, CA. Rotunda glazing, 1000' sq.
- 1985 Performing Arts Center, Anchorage, AK. Lobby glazing panels, 26 labyrinths 3'6"x3'
- 1983 Justice Center, Portland, OR. Lobby window, 24'x30'

=== Corporate ===
- 1992 1251 Rockefeller Center, New York City, New York. Lobby Transom windows, 7'x100' each
- 2002 Wells Fargo Tower, Denver, CO. Atrium sculpture, 118'x48'x90'
- 2000 520 North Michigan Avenue, Chicago, IL. Entry lobby sculpture, 72'x49'37'

=== Ecclesiastical ===
- 1997 St. Mark's Cathedral, Seattle, WA. Monumental screen and rose, 60'x32'x4'

== Grants ==
- 1984 National Endowment of the Arts Fellowship
- 1977 Western States Arts Foundation Fellowship
- 1976 National Endowment for the Arts Master Craftsman Grant
- 1975 Graham Foundation for Advanced Studies in Fine Arts

== Notable awards ==
- 2020 Landscape/ Urban Development Award of Merit: ENR Northwest Regional Best Projects Winners for Barbara Walker Crossing for the Wildwood Trail, Portland, OR.
- 2020 Collaboration of Design + Art in Public Spaces International Jury, Top Honors in Transportation for the Barbara Walker Crossing for the Wildwood Trail, Portland, OR
- 2004 Special Achievement Award for the Seattle US Courthouse, US General Service Administration, Seattle, WA.
- 2001Architectural Foundation of Oregon Honored Citizen of the Year Award, Portland, OR.
- 1999 Federal Highway Administration of Excellence in Highway Design for "Grasshopper Bridge", Phoenix, AZ.
- 1985 Portland Beautification Association Honor Award for the Justice Center Great Window

== Selected publications ==
- Carpenter, Ed (2001). Ed Carpenter: Breath of Light. Milano: L'arca. ISBN 9788878380851.
- The Economic Power of Public Art, CODAworx, May 2024. Barbara Walker Crossing p.74, "LoveBird p.166-167
- Republic of Taiwan Ministry of Culture: The Sixth Annual Public Arts Awards. "Crocus" at Taipei City Hall Park.
- l'ARCA, Milano, Italy, #240, October 2008
- Architectural Record, May 2004
- l'ARCA, Milano, Italy, #191, April 2004
