= Raymond R. Wright (USMC) =

United States Marine Corps general

Raymond Race Wright
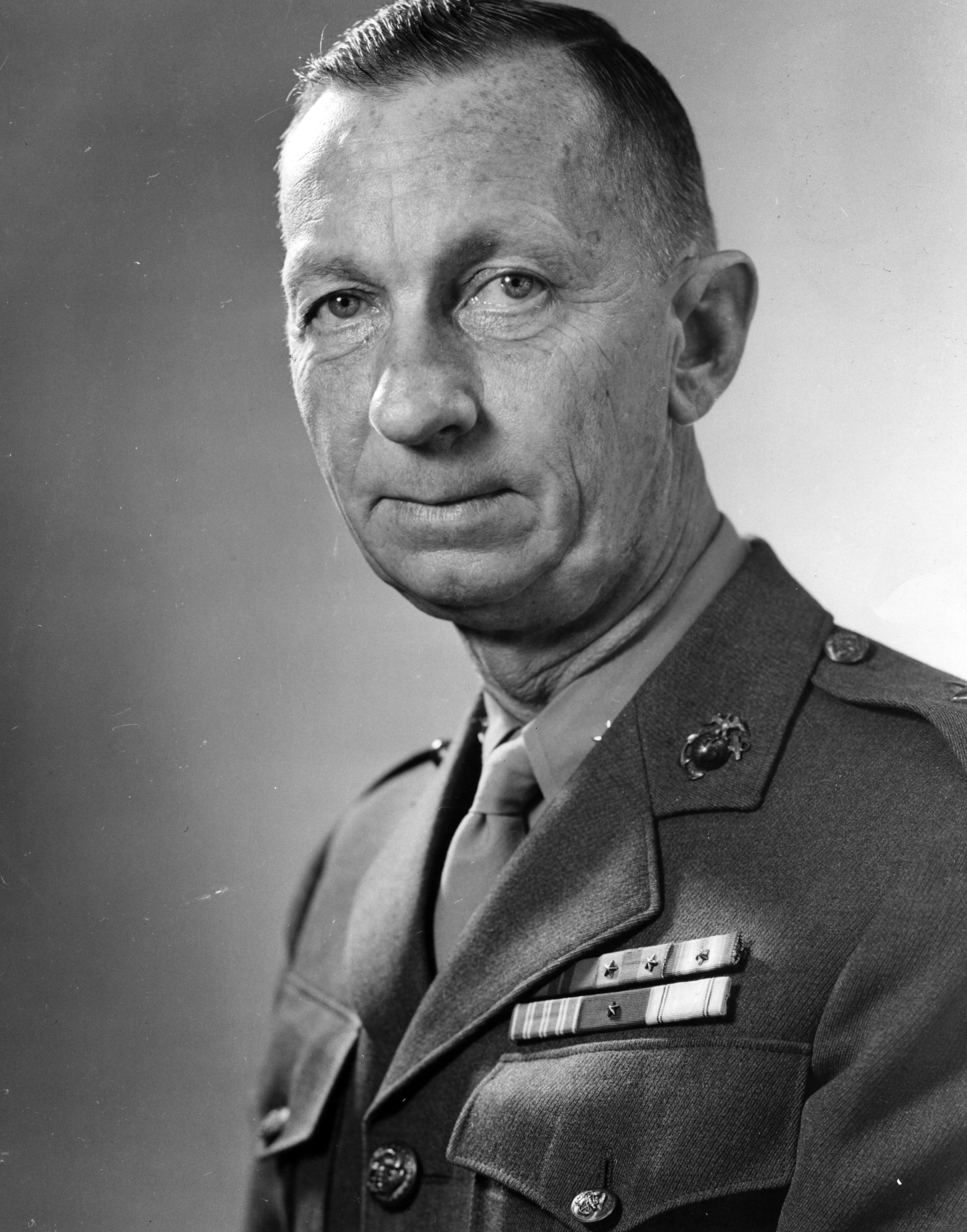
- Raymond R. Wright as brigadier general, USMC
- Born: February 5, 1892; Council Bluffs, Iowa, U.S.
- Died: February 19, 1964 (aged 72)
- Military career
- Allegiance: United States of America
- Branch: United States Marine Corps
- Service years: 1915–1946
- Rank: Major general
- Service number: 0-1089
- Commands: Paymaster of the Marine Corps
- Conflicts: Dominican Campaign; Haitian Campaign; World War I Nicaragua Campaign; World War II
- Awards: Legion of Merit; Navy Commendation Medal

Raymond Race Wright (February 5, 1892 – February 19, 1964) was an officer of the United States Marine Corps with the rank of major general, who served as Paymaster General of the Marine Corps during World War II.

== Early career ==
Raymond R. Wright was born on February 5, 1892, in Council Bluffs, Iowa, and attended the United States Naval Academy in Annapolis, Maryland. He graduated on 5 June 1915 and was commissioned second lieutenant in the Marine Corps on the same date. Wright subsequently attended the School of Application and graduated at the end of August 1915.

He was subsequently assigned to the Marine detachment aboard the battleship USS New Jersey and sailed to Dominican Republic, where he participated in the foreign shore duties. Wright then participated with his detachment in the Occupation duties in Haiti and returned to the United States in November 1918, already with the rank of captain.

After his arrival, Wright was assigned to the Paymaster Department within Headquarters Marine Corps in Washington, D.C., and was transferred to the Department of Pacific under the command of Major General George Barnett. He was transferred to the 1st Brigade of Marines and sent back to Haiti in February 1923.

== Interwar period ==
Following his return to the States, Wright served again with Paymaster Department in Washington, D.C. and as Assistant Paymaster at Marine Barracks in Philadelphia until 31 March 1928. He was then assigned to the 2nd Marine Brigade as Brigade Paymaster and sent to Nicaragua, where he participated in the suppression of the Sandino Rebellion. Wright was promoted to the rank of major in June 1929 and returned to the United States in May 1930. For his service in Nicaragua, he was decorated with Nicaraguan Presidential Order of Merit with Gold Star and also received a Special letter of commendation for his "distinguished service in the line of his profession as Brigade Paymaster" from the Secretary of the Navy Charles Francis Adams III.

Wright then served again with Department of Pacific, where he was appointed officer in charge of the assistant paymaster's office. In January 1931, Major Wright was appointed assistant chief of staff for supply and paymaster of the department. His next assignment came in June 1933, when he was transferred to San Francisco and appointed assistant chief of staff for Reserves within Western Recruiting Area. He was promoted to the rank of lieutenant colonel in March 1935. Lt.Colonel Wright attended Senior course at Naval War College in Newport, Rhode Island, and graduated in June 1936.

After graduation, Wright was sent back to the Headquarters Marine Corps in Washington, D.C., where he served first as personnel officer in the Division of Operations and Training and later was appointed executive officer in the Paymaster Department.

== World War II ==
Wright was promoted to the rank of colonel on 1 June 1939 and appointed Paymaster in the Department of Pacific, San Francisco in September of the same year. He was subsequently promoted to the rank of brigadier general in February 1942 and appointed Paymaster General of the Marine Corps on the same date.

In this capacity, Wright was responsible for the maintaining of the financial integrity of the Corps. He served in this capacity for the duration of the War and was promoted to the rank of major general on 22 June 1945. Wright retired from the Marine Corps in August 1946. For his service in this capacity, Major General Wright was decorated with the Legion of Merit.

== Decorations ==

1st Row	Legion of Merit		Navy Commendation Medal	
2nd Row	Dominican Campaign Medal	Marine Corps Expeditionary Medal with two stars	World War I Victory Medal with West Indies battle clasps	Second Nicaraguan Campaign Medal
3rd Row	American Defense Service Medal	American Campaign Medal	World War II Victory Medal	Nicaraguan Presidential Order of Merit with Gold star (Nicaragua)
