= Hannah Gross =

Canadian actress

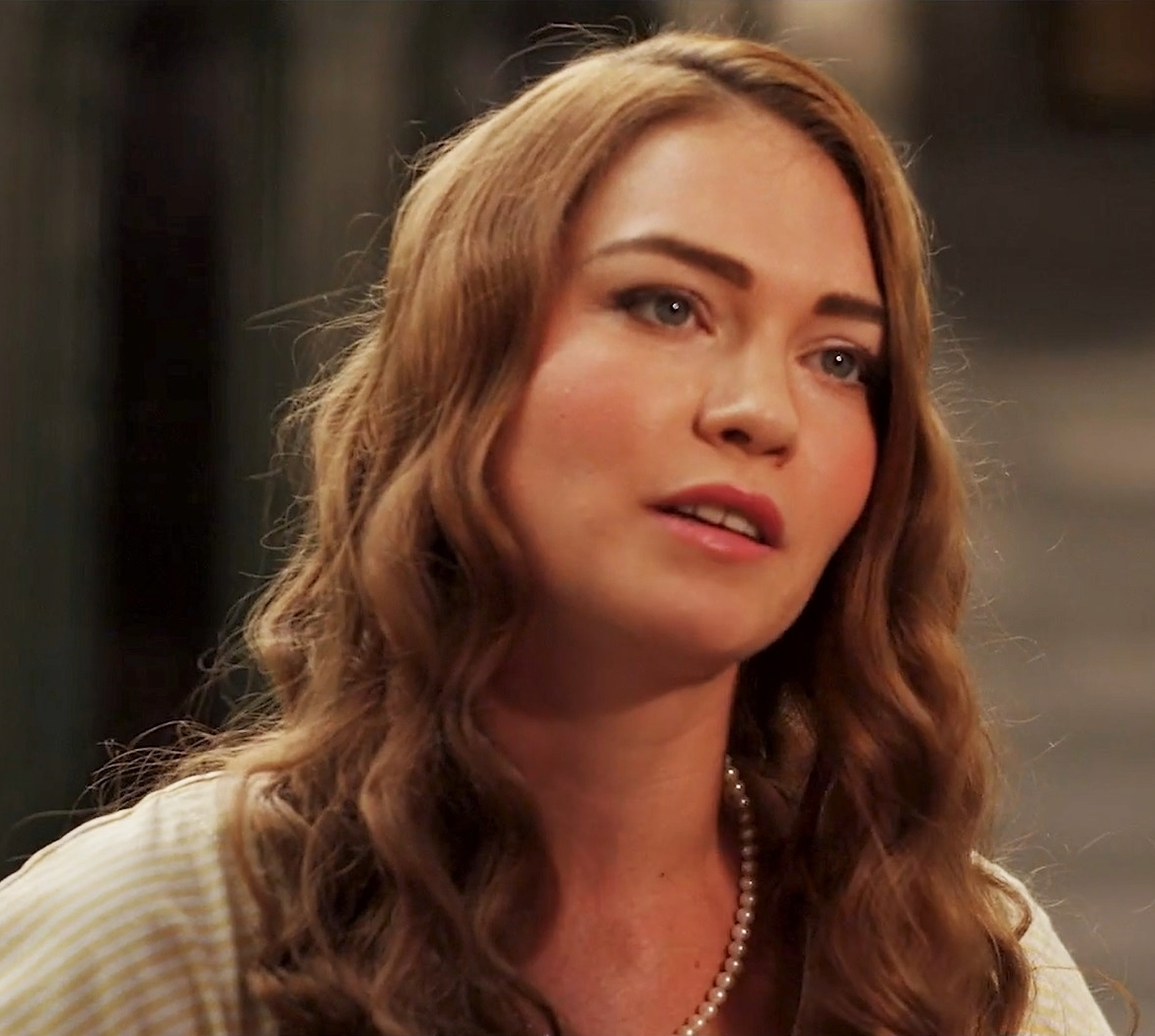
- Gross in Little Cabbage (2015)
- Born: 25 September 1990 (age 36)
- Education: New York University
- Occupation: Actress
- Years active: 2002–present
- Parents: Martha Burns; Paul Gross

Hannah Gross is a Canadian actress. The daughter of Canadian actors Paul Gross and Martha Burns, she is most known for her performances in independent cinema and for playing Debbie Mitford in the Netflix drama series Mindhunter (2017). Gross has appeared in a wide range of films throughout her career, including I Used to Be Darker (2013), Her Smell (2018), Joker (2019), Disappearance at Clifton Hill (2019), Falling (2020), Tesla (2020), The Adults (2023), and Infinite Summer (2024).

== Early life ==
Gross was born and raised in Toronto. She is the daughter of Canadian actors Martha Burns and Paul Gross. She attended New York University's Tisch School of the Arts and graduated with a Bachelor of Fine Arts in Theatre, minoring in Religious Studies.

== Career ==
Gross began her career in the early 2000s with uncredited roles in the films Men with Brooms and Wilby Wonderful. She also worked on stage. In 2010, Gross played Katie in Sharon Pollock's 1984 play Doc and directed Tennessee Williams' A Streetcar Named Desire (1947) for the Stella Adler Studio of Acting. She performed in Williams' 1953 one-act play Talk to Me Like the Rain and Let Me Listen in 2012.

Gross was cast in I Used to Be Darker (2013) after meeting its director, Matthew Porterfield, at the after show party for the New York City screening of his previous film, Putty Hill (2010). Also in 2013, she played the title character in Dustin Guy Defa's short film Lydia Hoffman Lydia Hoffman.

Gross played the lead female character in Charles Poekel's film Christmas, Again, which had its premiere at the 2014 Locarno International Film Festival. She also performed in Nathan Silver's 2014 film Uncertain Terms, and reunited with him in his 2015 film, Stinking Heaven. Also in 2014, Gross played the lead role in David Raboy's short film Beach Week.

In 2017, Gross achieved wider notice when she appeared in the Netflix drama Mindhunter, in which she played the supporting role of Debbie Mitford, a post-graduate student at the University of Virginia. Gross did not return for the second season of Mindhunter.

Following her turn in the first season of Mindhunter, Gross appeared in the films Her Smell (2018), Disappearance at Clifton Hill (2019), Falling (2020), and as Mina Edison in Tesla (2020), the latter of which premiered at the 2020 Sundance Film Festival. Gross also appeared as the younger version of Young Penny Fleck in the box office hit Joker (2019).

Gross starred opposite Michael Cera and Sophia Lillis in the comedy drama film The Adults, written and directed by Dustin Guy Defa, which competed for the Encounter Award at the 73rd Berlin International Film Festival, where it had its world premiere on February 18, 2023.

== Acting credits ==
=== Film ===
Year	Title	Role	Notes
2002	Men with Brooms	Girl at Game	Uncredited
2004	Wilby Wonderful	Girl at Motel	Uncredited
2005	Drei Mädchen	Daughter	Short film
2013	I Used to Be Darker	Abby	
2013	Lydia Hoffman Lydia Hoffman	Lydia Hoffman	Short film
2013	The Sixth Year	Gabby	Fifth segment
2014	Uncertain Terms	Cammy	
2014	Christmas, Again	Lydia	
2014	Haze	Natalie	Short film
2015	Valedictorian	Emily	
2015	Stinking Heaven	Ann	Additional writing
2015	Take What You Can Carry	Lilly	Short film
2015	Beach Week	Laure	Short film
2015	Little Cabbage	Ana	Short film
2016	The Zeno Question	Kirsten	Short film
2016	Dramatic Relationships		Short film
2016	Psychic Ills: Baby	Girl at Bar	Short film
2016	Psychic Ills: Another Change	Girl	Short film
2016	Unless	Norah	
2016	Nightshade	Rose Waltz	Short film
2017	Marjorie Prime	Young Marjorie	
2018	The Mountain	Susan	
2018	Her Smell	Tiffany	
2019	Joker	Young Penny Fleck	
2019	Disappearance at Clifton Hill	Laure	
2019	Colewell	Ella	
2020	Tesla	Mina Edison	
2020	Falling	Gwen Peterson	
2020	Flashback	Karen	
2023	The Adults	Rachel	
2024	Infinite Summer	Sarah	
2026	The Drama	Alice	

=== Television ===
Key
†	Denotes television productions that have not yet been released

Year	Title	Role	Notes
2017	Mindhunter	Debbie Mitford	Main cast (season 1)
2018	The Sinner	Marin Calhoun	Main cast (season 2)
2018	Deadwax	Etta Pryce	Main cast
2023	Essex County	Beth	Recurring role, limited series
2025	Zero Day	Anna Sindler	1 episode
TBA	The Savant †	TBA	Miniseries

=== Stage ===
Year	Title	Role	Notes
2010	Doc	Katie	Young Centre for the Performing Arts
2012	Talk to Me Like the Rain and Let Me Listen		Collapsable Hole
2012	A Streetcar Named Desire	—N/a	Director
