= Parkway Theatre (Baltimore) =

Movie theater in Baltimore, Maryland, US

Coordinates: 39°18′38″N 76°37′01″W

- Stavros Niarchos Foundation Parkway
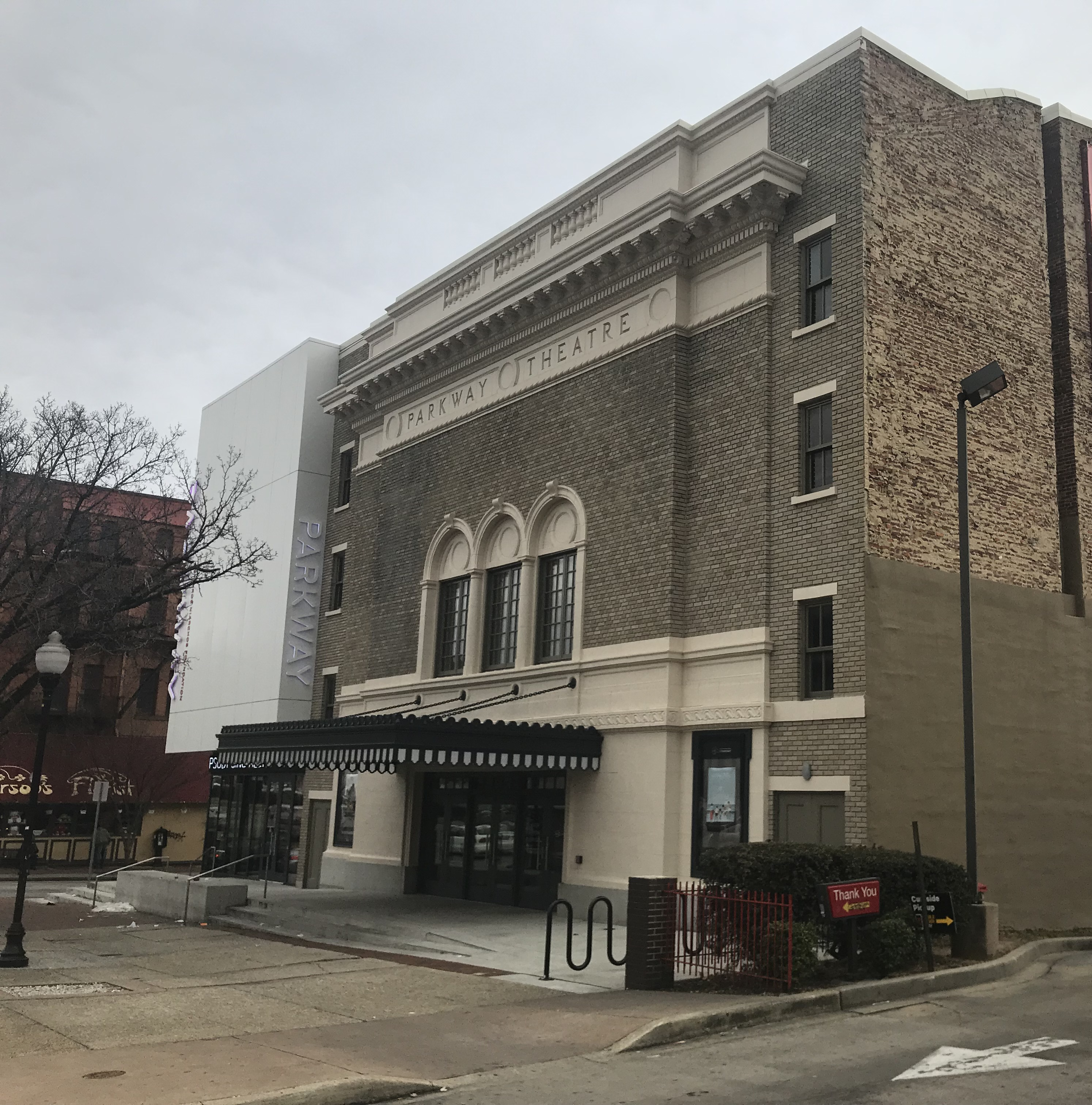
- Interactive map of Parkway Theatre
- Address: Charles Street & North Avenue; 5 West North Avenue; Baltimore, Maryland 21201; United States
- Owner: MdFF
- Operator: Maryland Film Festival
- Type: Cinema / Film

Construction
- Opened: October 23, 1915
- Renovated: 2016
- Closed: 1978
- Reopened: May 3, 2017 (Confirmed)
- Years active: 1915-1978, 2017-
- Architects: Oliver Birkhead Wight, Ziger/Snead (2016 remodel)

Website
- snfparkway.org

The Stavros Niarchos Foundation Parkway, or simply the Parkway, is a movie theater located at 5 West North Avenue in Baltimore, Maryland. The Parkway was opened on May 3, 2017, and is the permanent home of MdFF. The Maryland Film Festival, a 5-day annual festival created and operated by MdFF, is housed in and around the Parkway and throughout the Station North Arts and Entertainment District.

According to Jed Dietz, founding director of Maryland Film Festival, the Parkway was one of the original movie palaces on the east coast and from the day it opened on October 23, 1915 till the day it closed in 1978 it served the community beautifully. It was built in 1915 and was originally intended for vaudeville, and has also been used for a live radio broadcast program named "Nocturne" with Roland Nuttrell playing the Wurlitzer Organ and Charles Purcell reading poetry from 1937 to 1957. It closed in 1978 but was painstakingly renovated as the Stavros Niarchos Foundation Film Center.

The theater is located in the North Central Historic District of Baltimore, which was added to the National Register of Historic Places in December 2002, as well as the Station North Arts and Entertainment District. In August 2012, the Parkway was considered for city landmark status.

== History ==
=== 1915–1970s ===
The Parkway Theatre was designed by Oliver Birkhead Wight, a native of Baltimore County who designed other theaters in the city, including The New Theater, The McHenry Theater, and the Howard Theater. Its design was "closely modeled on London's West End Theater, later known as the Rialto, with shared features like the interior's rich ornamental plaster work in a Louis XIV style." The Parkway contains Italian Renaissance and Beaux-Arts architectural elements. The exterior is terra cotta and beige brick; the auditorium was originally oval or egg shaped, as in the London model, with "royal boxes" and additional loges on either side, and had a marble lobby, a tea-room decorated in grey with old rose hangings, and chandeliers modeled on those at Versailles and Fontainebleau.

The theater cost about $120,000 to build, and was "originally envisioned by owner Henry Webb's Northern Amusement Company as a 1100-seat vaudeville house." Opening night on October 23, 1915, featured a screening of Zaza starring Pauline Frederick.

In 1926, the Parkway was purchased by Loew's Theaters Incorporated, who had it remodeled by local architect John Eberson who also designed the Valencia Theatre above the century theatre on 18 West Lexington Street in 1926 and replaced the 1915 Moller organ with a 2 manual 8 rank Wurlitzer opus #1421 style F, and had both "Royal Boxes" removed (even though the cupolas underneath both remained), seating capacity was reduced. In addition to films and vaudeville, the theater was used for live radio; in the late 1940s and early 1950s at 12:00am Roland Nuttrell and Charles Purcell produced a nightly live WCAO radio program at the Parkway entitled Nocturne, featuring poetry readings in a deep baritone voice by Charles Purcell, interspersed with melodic lullaby selections on the 2/8 Wurlitzer organ by Roland Nuttrell that were far more effective at putting a person to sleep than taking sleeping pills. John Kilduff of Baltimore was a talented artist and saxophonist of The Red Devils (a Baltimore Jazz Band), he sketched and designed mostly all of the advertisements and coming attraction displays for the parkway and other Loew's Theatres such as The Century/Valencia Theatres, and Keith's Garden Theatre (Where he worked for years).

Local theater operator Morris Mechanic purchased the Parkway and closed the doors in 1952 and suggested that it be turned into offices. However, under a succession of later owners, it was briefly used for live theater (Hilltop Theatre Parkway) and then under the new name of Five West Art Theatre in 1956 for classic and foreign films and performances until it closed in 1978. After that, the lobby and foyer space became a Korean grocery store in the 1980s, and the owner simply walled off the screen and theater seating, so much of that is still intact.

=== Neglect (1970s–2012) ===
The theater closed its doors for good in 1978, due to poor attendance and urban decline. It changed hands several times and there were attempts to find a new use for the building. At one point it was the headquarters of an association of Korean business owners. It has been vacant since 1998. In 2004 it was opened for one evening as part of an event called "Gotta Have Art" and the Baltimore Sun's Jacques Kelly described it as "a jewel-box design" and judged the plaster work only "about 10 percent damaged by neglect". The City of Baltimore included it in the Charles North Vision Plan and in 2009 contracted with developer Samuel Polakoff to convert it into a performance space at a cost of $12 million, but withdrew the rights in 2011. In the early 2000s, local engineer, theatre organ aficionado and player piano restoration technician, John R. Grant, attempted to raise consciousness about the plight of the Parkway in an effort to return it to its original splendor, to include original Wurlitzer theatre organ opus #1419, a virtual twin to opus #1421 (which was installed during the 1926 remodeling), and removed and dispersed in the 1960s. Prior to this removal, the organ was an integral feature of the popular midnight radio program “Nocturne” (detailed above). However, unable to find enthusiasm or vision for including that salient and emblematic feature of classical movie houses in the current interpretation, this proposal would have to be abandoned.

=== Restoration and re-opening (2016) ===
On October 20, 2014, Johns Hopkins University announced that the theater would be reopening in mid-2017. This announcement was prompted by a five million dollar donation from the international philanthropic organization, the Stavros Niarchos Foundation. Renovations on the Parkway Theatre began in early 2012, but this recent donation has greatly assisted the process. The theater will be renamed the Stavros Niarchos Foundation Parkway Film Centre and will contain three screens, six hundred twenty seats, and a live performance area, the main auditorium will have a seating capacity of 420 seats and the new building next door will contain two smaller 100-seat theatres bringing the total number of seats to 620. The center will not only be dedicated to exhibiting films; it will also be a space for education. It will aid both (JHU) Johns Hopkins University and the MICA’s film programs by allowing them to study the production of filmmaking and documentation . It is also envisioned as a site of the Maryland Film Festival. Updates to the center will include new projection, sound, and movie viewing technology also including heating and air conditioning ventilation systems. Although there will be modern additions to the center, the goal of the renovation is to maintain the theater’s historical integrity, as Jed Dietz puts it "we're not exactly Restoring it, It's more about Rescuing it". Current construction updates are as follows: The old flooring of the lobby, orchestra and stage areas have been removed and new flooring has been laid, the old deteriorated stage curtain has been removed and will be replaced with a brand new one after construction is completed, all the old seats on the balcony level have been removed and will be replaced with new wider comfortable seats that will have cup holders to accommodate patrons, the platforms on the balcony level has been deepened to create more legroom and better walking space between rows, the tea room on the second floor has been expanded twice its regular size to include a bar and lounge area, the building at 1 West North Avenue which formerly housed a pharmacy store and restaurant will be demolished and replaced by a new building which will house two smaller-sized 100-seat theatres and a small lounge in the foyer area which will be connected with the SNF Parkway.. The design phase of the project was completed in January 2015. The Parkway celebrated its 100th birthday on October 23, 2015 marking the 100th anniversary of its grand opening on October 23, 1915 with the showing of Pauline Frederick in Zaza. The Parkway is expected to have its Grand reopening in mid-2017, Station North is aiming to attract as many patrons for its Inaugural Grand Reopening. The estimated total cost of the renovation is $18.2 million. The current status of the construction phase is nearly complete, the corner building that formerly housed a pharmacy and restaurant has been demolished and the new structure that will house the 2 smaller 100-seat theatres along with the lounge is nearing completion, the interior of the Parkway has been partially restored (new paint as well as the original paint can be seen on the walls and ceiling surrounding the dome), as well as the addition of a replicated 1915 marquee with a nicely clean facade illuminated by replicated light bulbs on top above the original name PARKWAY THEATRE carved into the building.

In January 2023, it was announced that all films screening and other events would be cancelled indefinitely and most of the staff was laid off due to financial pressures. In May 2024, it was announced that the theater would re-open for the 25th Maryland Film Festival.

=== Programming by Maryland Film Festival (2017–present) ===
The Parkway restoration project was completed in the Spring of 2017 and the theater opened on May 3, 2017, with the opening night of the 19th Annual Maryland Film Festival

The band Beach House shot the music video for their song "Chariots" in the historic auditorium of the Parkway in April, 2017 prior to the theater's public opening.

The first public screening in The Parkway was the Opening Night Shorts Program of the 2017 Maryland Film Festival on May 3, 2017, hosted by Josephine Decker and Kris Swanberg and the directors of each short film presented. The first short presented, and therefore the first film to screen in The Parkway in decades, was Jessica Kingdon's Commodity City. The other shorts presented that evening were Terence Nance's They Charge For the Sun, Jeannie Donohoe's Game, Matthew Salton's Richard Twice, and Nathan Truesdell's Balloonfest.

The first feature film screened in the Parkway was Barry Levinson's television film The Wizard of Lies on the afternoon of Thursday, May 4, 2017. The first theatrical film screened in the Parkway was Theo Anthony's Rat Film the same evening. The first 35mm film screened in the Parkway was Agnès Varda's Vagabond, guest-curated and hosted by the band Beach House, on the evening of Saturday, May 6, 2017. The first live music performance in the restored Parkway was Alloy Orchestra's live score for the German silent film Variety on Sunday, May 7. These screenings all took place within Maryland Film Festival 2017.

The Parkway opened for year-round business on the evening of Friday, May 12. The first feature film screened in the Parkway in a non-festival setting was John Waters' Female Trouble. Other films screened that evening included David Lynch's Mulholland Drive, Jenny Gage's All This Panic, and Kristopher Avedisian's Donald Cried. The last two titles were the first films to have week-long theatrical runs at the restored Parkway.

The first live music outside a festival setting was curated by members of the band Animal Collective in tribute to the late experimental musician Tony Conrad on the evenings of Friday, September 29 and Saturday September 30, 2017. The performers included Deakin and Geologist of Animal Collective, Dan Deacon with Jessie Hughes and M. C. (Martin) Schmidt of Matmos, Asa Osborne of Lungfish and Zomes, Owen Gardner and Andrew Bernstein of Horse Lords, Steve Strohmeier, and Daniel Conrad.

Longtime director of programming Eric Allen Hatch, who began working for MdFF in 2007, departed as lead programmer of The Parkway in February, 2018, citing creative differences detailed in a Filmmaker article concerning the need for greater risk-taking and attention to diversity in independent-film festivals and alternative venues.
