= Atlanta Film Festival =

International film festival in Georgia, USA

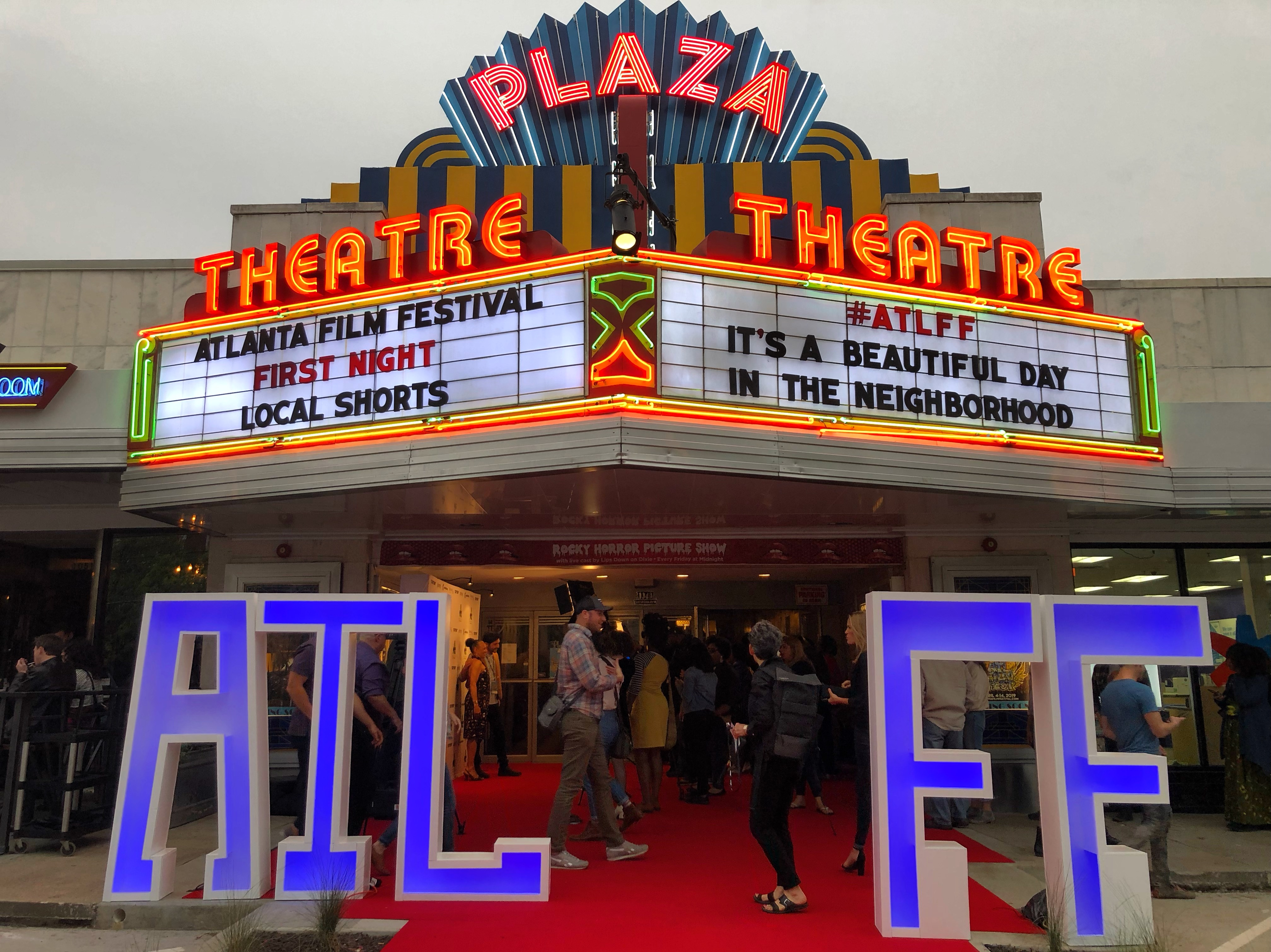
- First Night of the 2019 Atlanta Film Festival at The Plaza Theatre
- Location: Atlanta, Georgia, US
- Predecessor: Atlanta International Film Festival
- Established: 1976
- Producers: Atlanta Film Society
- No. of films: 150-250
- Language: International
- Website: atlantafilmfestival.com

The Atlanta Film Festival (ATLFF) is an Oscar-qualifying international film festival held in Atlanta, Georgia and operated by the Atlanta Film Society, a 501(c)(3) nonprofit organization. Started in 1976 and occurring every spring, the festival shows a diverse range of independent films, with special attention paid to women-directed films, LGBTQ films, Latin American films, Black films and films from the American Southeast. ATLFF is one of only a handful of festivals that are Academy Award-qualifying in all three short film categories.

== History ==
=== Founding ===
In 1968, the Atlanta International Film Festival was launched, becoming Atlanta's first major film event. It operated until 1974 when the organizers were no longer able to finance the operation. Two years later, a group of independent filmmakers and artists established Independent Media Artists of Georgia, Etc. (IMAGE) as a 501(c)(3) nonprofit organization in 1976. The IMAGE Film & Video Center opened that year as the first media arts center in the state of Georgia, providing much-needed equipment access, networking, information dissemination, and support to local filmmakers. A year later, the inaugural Atlanta Independent Film & Video Festival launched on May 14, 1977 at the Piedmont Park Bathhouse.

==== Name Changes ====
In 1984, the organization truncated the name of the festival to the Atlanta Film and Video Festival, and again in 2002, to the Atlanta Film Festival. In 2015, the parent organization became known as the Atlanta Film Society.

==== Effects of the COVID-19 pandemic ====
In March 2020, ATLFF made the decision to postpone the 44th edition due to the COVID-19 pandemic. The original dates of April 30-May 10 were rescheduled to September 17–27. This will mark the first time in the organization's history that the event will take place beyond the spring or early summer months. The 2022 event had the festival back to its usual practice with many awards.

=== Academy Award Qualification ===
For decades, ATLFF has been an Academy Award-qualifying event for the Academy Award for Best Live Action Short Film and the Academy Award for Best Animated Short Film. After AMPAS changed the rules for the Academy Award for Best Documentary (Short Subject) qualification, ATLFF became Oscar-qualifying in all three short film categories in 2015. The winners of the Best Narrative Short Film, Best Animated Short Film and Best Documentary Short Film Jury Prizes go on to be eligible for the respective shortlists for their Oscar categories. Ray McKinnon's The Accountant won the Academy Award for Best Live Action Short Film in 2002 after qualifying at the 2001 Atlanta Film Festival.

=== IMAGE Film Awards Gala ===
On June 7, 2001, the organization launched the annual IMAGE Film Awards Gala as a separate event attached to the annual film festival. Recognizing individuals and organizations who have made outstanding contributions to building the state's film industry and community, the awards were named in honor of the organization's founding name. Robert Osborne of Turner Classic Movies hosted the first reception where founding IMAGE Executive Director Gayla Jamison, Georgia Governor Zell Miller, Academy Award-nominated filmmaker Gary Moss, and Crawford Communications were the inaugural honorees.

The IMAGE Film Awards Gala continued for eight years until 2008, when the Atlanta Film Society paused the program for over a decade. It returned again on April 3, 2019 at the Fox Theatre's Egyptian Ballroom attached to the 43rd annual ATLFF, where Georgia Attorney General Chris Carr, Actor/Musician/Producer Tip "T.I." Harris, Director Corporate Responsibility & Civic Affairs at Turner Broadcasting and Georgia Representative Betsy Holland, and "The Walking Dead" Executive Producer Tom Luse were honored.

Other IMAGE Film Award recipients include Dallas Austin, Ossie Davis, Ruby Dee, the Georgia Film Office, Diane Ladd, Spike Lee, Will Packer, Parker Posey, Burt Reynolds, Michael Stipe, Tyler Perry Studios, and Cicely Tyson.

=== Notable discoveries ===
Spike Lee may be considered ATLFF's first great filmmaker discovery. Lee made his first film, Last Hustle in Brooklyn, while a mass communications student at Morehouse College with the encouragement of his mentor, Dr. Herb Eichelberger, a co-founder of the Atlanta Film Society (then known as IMAGE). The festival was the first to screen the film, where it won a jury prize of $25. After winning the jury prize, Lee decided to pursue a career as a filmmaker. ATLFF also screened Joe's Bed-Stuy Barbershop: We Cut Heads, which won Lee a 1983 Student Academy Award. He was honored in 2005 with the inaugural Ossie Davis Award, in 2009 with a 20th-anniversary screening of Do The Right Thing, and in 2019 with the Originator Award.

When ATLFF revived its annual Screenplay Competition in 2008, Athens-native James Ponsoldt was among the inaugural winners. Ponsoldt later went on to serve as a mentor for the Screenwriter's Retreat (the main prize of the Screenplay Competition) and his film The Spectacular Now was the Closing Night presentation of the 2013 ATLFF.

Stella Meghie's debut feature Jean of the Joneses won the 2011 ATLFF Screenplay Competition and went on to be the first winning screenplay to be produced and play the festival. The film premiered at the 2016 South by Southwest Film Festival and then played ATLFF, with Meghie in attendance alongside stars Sherri Shepherd, Taylour Paige and Erica Ash.

Additionally, ATLFF has played the first works of Heidi Ewing, David Gordon Green, Reinaldo Marcus Green, Tina Mabry, Ray McKinnon, Victor Nuñez, Robert Rodriguez, RuPaul, David O. Russell and more.

== Locations ==
Over the years, the festival's primary venues have included theaters such as Piedmont Park, High Museum of Art, Fox Theatre, Landmark Midtown Art Cinema, Atlantic Station Regal Cinemas, 7 Stages Theatre in Little Five Points and The Rialto Center for the Arts at Georgia State University. In 2013, ATLFF moved its principle screening operations to The Plaza Theatre in the Poncey-Highland neighborhood.

=== Midtown ===
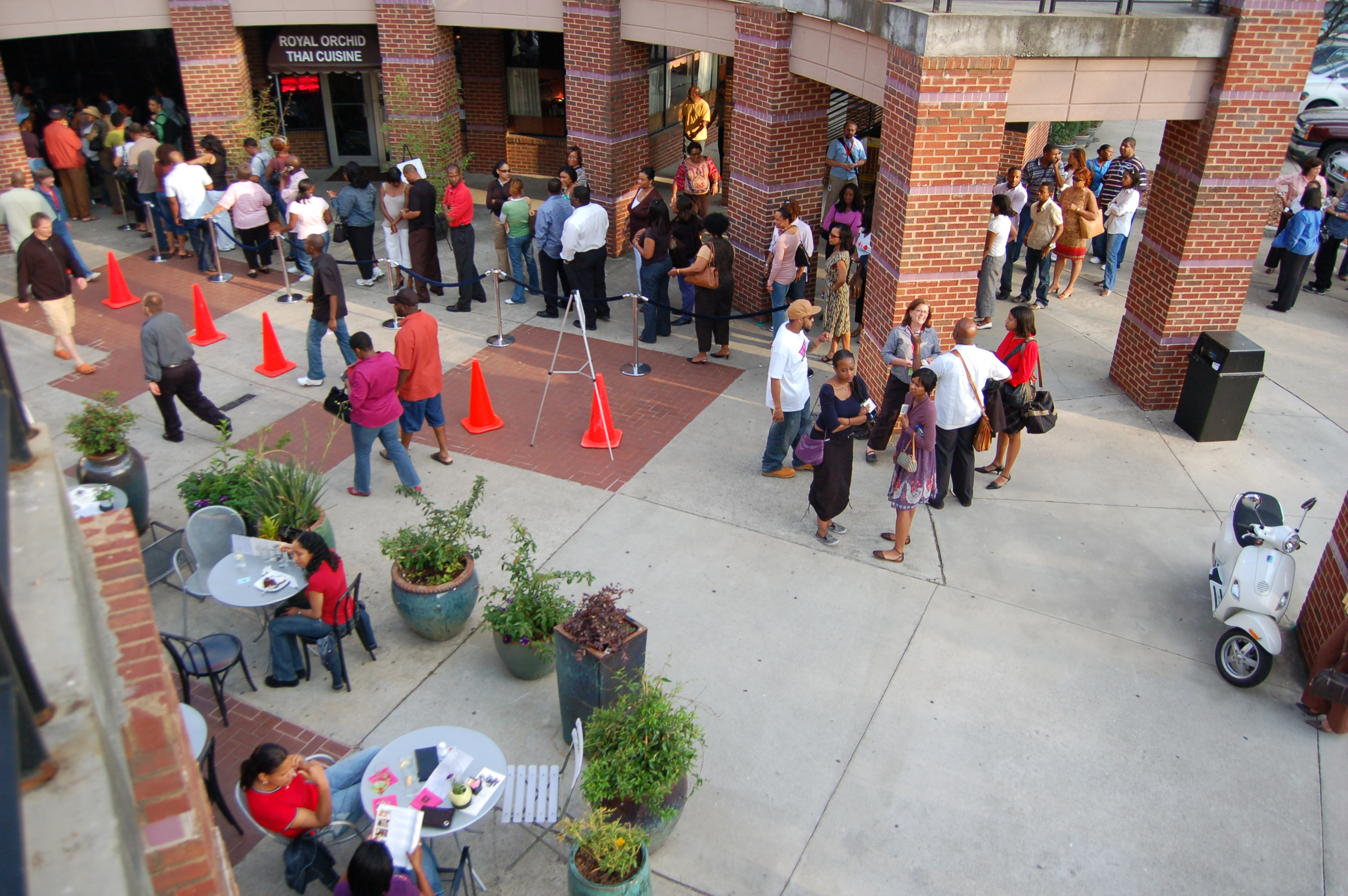
2007 Atlanta Film Festival

In 2007, the festival partnered with the Landmark Midtown Art Cinema to centrally locate the festival to Midtown, dubbed the "Heart of Atlanta’s Arts" and home to a wide array of restaurants, bars and shops. The change allowed the festival more opportunities for panels, screenplay readings, film discussions and after-parties.

=== Highlands and Little Five Points ===
After 6 years centered at Landmark, the festival moved its home base to Atlanta's oldest continually operating cinema, The Plaza Theatre on Ponce de Leon Avenue, and added 7 Stages Theatre as a secondary venue. Taking advantage of the Poncey-Highland and Little 5 Points areas, the change pushed the event to be more of a walkable festival. The move was praised by locals and introduced out-of-town guests to Atlanta's unique neighborhoods. In the years since, ATLFF has reactivated the historic Hilan Theatre on North Highland Avenue in Virginia-Highland and incorporated several local landmarks as venues, such as The Highland Inn & Ballroom, The Church at Ponce & Highland, Ponce City Market, The Hotel Clermont and Dad's Garage Theatre Company.

== Programming ==
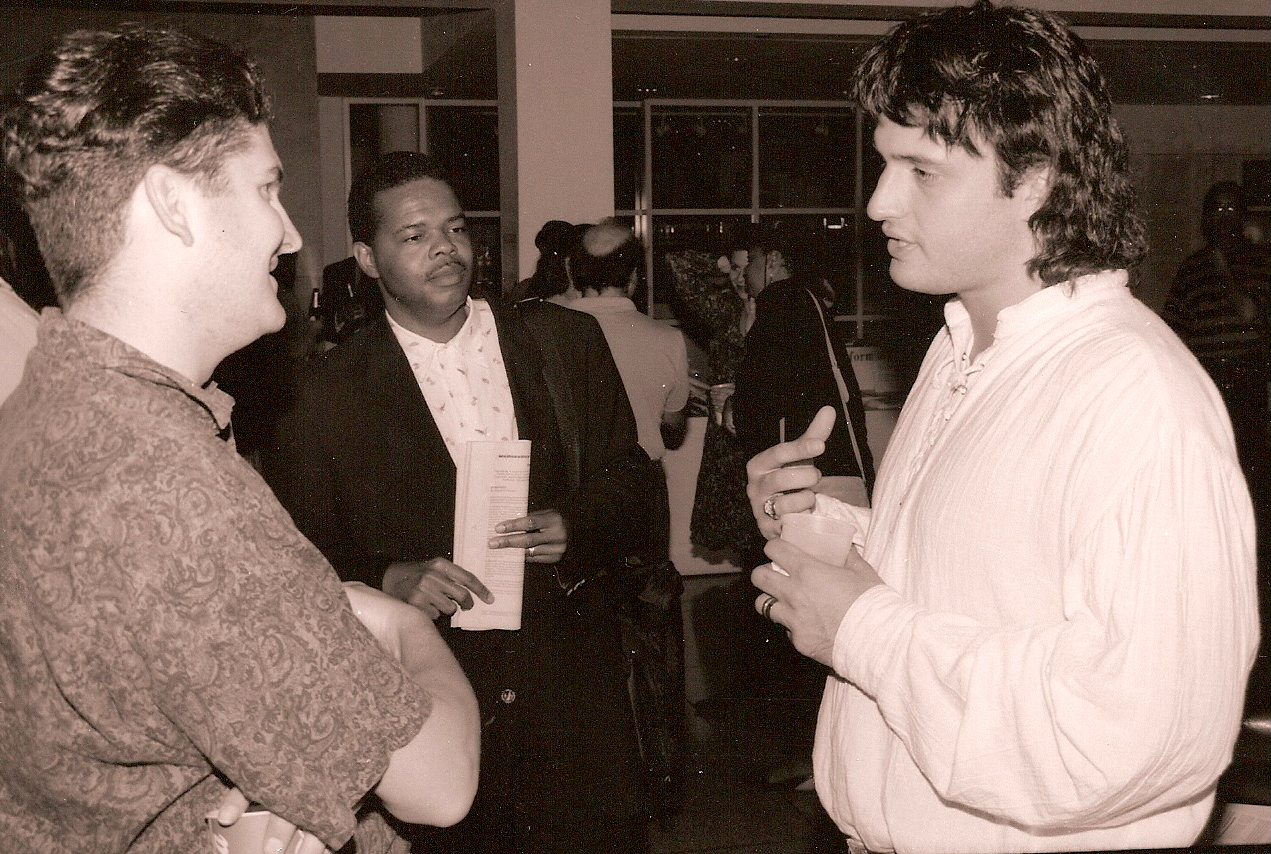
Robert Rodriguez at the 1993 Atlanta Film Festival with El Mariachi

On Average, ATLFF programs between 150 and 250 films from approximately 50 countries each year. For the 2020 Film Festival, ATLFF received 8,559 works submitted for consideration. On average, 85-95% of each year's film program comes from submissions, which special tracks designated for women filmmakers (New Mavericks), Black filmmakers, LGBTQ content (Pink Peach), Latin American content and Georgia-tied content.

=== ATLFF Screenplay Competition and Screenwriter's Retreat ===
Since 2008, ATLFF has hosted an annual Screenplay Competition that attracts over 1,300 submissions each year. Three feature film screenwriter winners attend a 3-day Screenwriter's Retreat at Serenbe where professional mentors help them workshop their scripts and get ready for the next stages of production. Winning screenplays also are featured at the festival in a staged table read. Additional prizes are also offered to winning episodic and short film scripts.

=== Out on Film and Pink Peach ===
For years the Atlanta Film Festival organization produced Atlanta's Out on Film gay film festival. In the Fall of 2008 the Atlanta Film Festival gave Out on Film to the LGBTQ community. Out on Film became an independent, 501(c)(3) gay/lesbian operation. Since 2008, the festival has included the Pink Peach track, highlighting LGBTQ films and filmmakers.

From 2008 to 2015, there was a Pink Peach Jury Award annually given to a feature film. Since 2016, LGBTQ films in competition are considered for the general jury prizes.

Year	Pink Peach Jury Award-winner
2008	XXY
2009	Training Rules
2010	8: The Mormon Proposition
2011	Bear Nation
2012	Cloudburst
2013	God Loves Uganda
2014	Queens & Cowboys: A Straight Year on the Gay Rodeo
2015	Before the Last Curtain Falls

=== New Mavericks ===
In 2013, the festival featured a shorts block titled New Mavericks, featuring films by female filmmakers with strong female leads. This began an annual tradition and in 2015, the New Mavericks program was expanded to include feature films and an annual New Mavericks prize.

=== SOUND+VISION ===
In 2012, the festival partnered with the Goat Farm Arts Center and indieATL to introduce a special, mostly-outdoor event featuring music videos, art installations and live musical performances called SOUND+VISION. The evening is an example of the types of elements film festivals continue to add as they look to redefine themselves, connect with audiences and innovate. An estimated 1,200 people attended in its inaugural year, dropping to just under 800 in 2013, due to inclement weather. In 2014, the event drew over 1,500 attendees, and eclipsed 3,000 attendees in 2015. In 2016, the event moved to Ponce City Market and again to 787 Windsor in 2017. After a year break, SOUND+VISION returned and took place on the Beltline and in Historic Fourth Ward Park in 2019.

== Individual Award Recipients ==
IMAGE Film Award

- Gary Moss (2001)
- Gayla Jamison (2001)
- Zell Miller (2001)
- Crawford Communications (2001)
- Victor Nunez (2002)
- Jim McKay and Michael Stipe (2002)
- PC&E (Production Consultants and Equipment) (2002)
- Eleanor Ringel Gillespie (2002)
- Ossie Davis (2003)
- Ruby Dee (2003)
- Burt Reynolds (2003)
- Parker Posey (2003)
- Georgia Office of Film, Video and Music (2003)
- Digital Projection (2003)
- Dallas Austin (2004)
- Diane Ladd (2004)
- Lon Slack (2004)
- Bill VanDerKloot (2004)
- Linda Dubler (2004)
- Dr. Herbert Eichelberger (2005)
- George King (2005)
- W. Bruce Harlan (2005)
- Guy H. Tuttle (2005)
- Katherine Evans (2005)
- Linda Burns (2005)
- Dr. Kay Beck (2006)
- George LeFont (2006)
- Lab 601 (2006)
- Will Packer (2007)
- Kenny Blank (2007)
- GPP (Georgia Production Partnership) (2007)
- Steve James and Peter Gilbert (2008)
- Tyler Perry Studios (2008)
- Dr. Matthew Bernstein (2008)
- Virginia Hepner (2008)
- Tom Luse (2019)
- Betsy Holland (2019)
- Christopher M. Carr (2019)
- T.I. (2019)
- Daveed Diggs (2019)

Southeastern Media Award

- Eric Wise; City Boys Dream of Beaches (1995)
- Dorne M. Pentes; The Closest Thing to Heaven (1996)
- Robert Clem; Big Jim Folsom: The Two Faces of Populism (1997)
- Nick Searcy, Sean Bridgers; Paradise Falls (1998)
- Michael Porembski; Burning Questions (1999)
- David Gordon Green; George Washington (2000)
- Ray McKinnon; The Accountant (2001)
- Kristen McGary, Amy McGary; The Adventures of Ociee Nash (2002)

Ossie Davis Award

- Spike Lee (2005)
- Cicely Tyson (2006)
- John Sayles, Maggie Renzi (2007)

Filmmaker-to-Watch Award

- Sean Bloch (2006)
- Julien Paolini (2013)
- Moon Molson (2014)
- Ian Samuels (2015)
- Thoranna Sigurdardottir (2016)
- Malcolm Washington (2017)
- Connor Simpson (2018)
- Kalu Oji (2019)
- Esteban Bailey (2022)

New Mavericks Award

- Meryem Benm'Barek-Aloïsi; Jennah (2015)
- Erica Tremblay; In the Turn (2015)
- Elisa Paloschi; Driving with Selvi (2016)
- Katy Grannan, Hannah Hughes; The Nine (2017)

Innovator Award

- Daveed Diggs (2018)

Phoenix Award

- Kiersey Clemons (2018)
- George Anthony Morton (2022)

Rebel Award

- Jason Reitman (2018)
- President Jimmy Carter (2021)

Originator Award

- Joe Berlinger (2019)
- Spike Lee (2019)

== Notable films that have played the festival ==
Year	Films
1970	Shinbone Alley
1983	Chicken Ranch
1993	El Mariachi
2002	West 47th Street
2004	Primer, Control Room, Born into Brothels, Baadasssss!, Bomb the System, Zatōichi, Dirty Work, Dear Pillow
2005	Sympathy for Mr. Vengeance, The Puffy Chair, Emmanuel's Gift, The Boys of Baraka, Hustle & Flow, Me and You and Everyone We Know
2006	Quinceanera, Who Killed the Electric Car?, Factotum, The Other Side
2007	The Signal, Hannah Takes the Stairs, Kamp Katrina, Blood Car, Great World of Sound, Fay Grim, The Last Days of Left Eye, King of Kong, Murder Party, Away From Her, Darius Goes West: The Roll of His Life, Killer of Sheep, La Vie En Rose, War/Dance
2008	The Lena Baker Story, Dance of the Dead, Make-out with Violence, Mongol, American Teen, At the Death House Door, The Visitor, Land of Confusion, Nerdcore Rising, My Effortless Brilliance, The Cake Eaters, XXY
2009	(500) Days of Summer, The People Speak, Rudo y Cursi, That Evening Sun, Tyson, Moon, Beeswax, Alexander the Last, Art & Copy, Mississippi Damned, Neshoba, Idiots & Angels, Wallace & Gromit: A Matter of Loaf and Death, Naturally Obsessed
2010	Winter's Bone, The Square, 8: The Mormon Proposition, Racing Dreams, Horn Dog, Pigeon: Impossible, I Am Comic, Family Affair, 9500 Liberty, Cropsey, Putty Hill, American Jihadist, Yellowbrickroad, Handsome Harry, Freedom Riders, Godspeed, Wheedle's Groove
2011	Terri, Sahkanaga, The First Grader, White Irish Drinkers, Incendies, Young Goethe in Love, Hot Coffee, The Start of Dreams
2012	L!fe Happens, The Cabin in the Woods, Americano, Boy, The Woman in the Fifth, Take Me Home, AKA Blondie, John Portman: A Life of Building, V/H/S, My Last Day Without You, OK, Good, That's What She Said, Monsieur Lazhar, Marley
2013	Mud, The Spectacular Now, I Used to Be Darker, Concussion, God Loves Uganda, A River Changes Course, Interior. Leather Bar., Blood Brother, Good Ol' Freda, White Reindeer, Iceberg Slim: Portrait of a Pimp, A Teacher, Blood Brother, Between Us, Our Nixon
2014	Obvious Child, Locke, Joe, The Double, The Congress, The Raid 2, The Sacrament, Limo Ride, Mayan Blue
2015	I Am Michael, Sunshine Superman, Krisha, While We're Young
2016	The Fundamentals of Caring, Jean of the Joneses, Morris From America, The Fits, Miles Ahead, Driving with Selvi
2017	Menashe, Dave Made a Maze, The Zookeeper's Wife, The Lost City of Z, The Hero, Whose Streets?
2018	Eighth Grade, Blindspotting, American Animals, Hearts Beat Loud, Lean on Pete, Leave No Trace, A Prayer Before Dawn, Summer '03, Tully, You Were Never Really Here
2019	The Farewell, Them That Follow, Extremely Wicked, Shockingly Evil and Vile, Greener Grass, Teen Spirit, In Fabric, Miles Davis: Birth of the Cool

== Feature Film Award-Winners ==
Year	Narrative Feature	Documentary Feature	Audience Award Feature
1999	The Double Life of Ernesto Gomez-Gomez	American Gypsy: A Stranger in Everybody's Land	A Luv Tale
2000	Good Housekeeping	Good Kurds, Bad Kurds: No Friends But the Mountains	—
2001	Hybrid	Confederacy Theory, T-shirt Travels	The Journey, Scratch
2002	My Father, the Genius	That's My Face	Jimmy Scott: If You Only Knew
2003	Zero Day	A Certain Kind of Death, Girlhood	—
2004	Dear Pillow	Dirty Work	—
2005	Most High	The Boys of Baraka	—
2006	Pope Dreams	What Remains	Loving Annabelle
2007	Great World of Sound	Protagonist	Darius Goes West
2008	Make-out with Violence	At the Death House Door	Young@Heart
2009	That Evening Sun	The Way We Get By	Beyond Gay: The Politics of Pride, Living is Winning
2010	Putty Hill	Family Affair	—
2011	Prairie Love	An African Election	Disabled but Able to Rock, Sahkanaga
2012	Welcome to Pine Hill	Code 2600	—
2013	I Used to Be Darker	A River Changes Course	Blood Brother
2014	I Believe in Unicorns	Getting to the Nutcracker	Little Ballers
2015	God Bless the Child	Stray Dog	Help Us Find Sunil Tripathi
2016	Hunky Dory	Driving with Selvi	The Founders
2017	Cortez	Rat Film	Holden On
2018	Restos De Viento (Wind Traces)	Man Made	Maynard
2019	Greener Grass	The Fourth Kingdom (El Cuarto Reino)	The Farewell

== See also ==
- Sundance Film Festival
- SXSW Film Festival
- Nashville Film Festival
- Atlanta Jewish Film Festival
- List of film festivals
- List of film festivals in North and Central America
