= Maryland Film Festival =

Film festival in Maryland, U.S.

- Location: Baltimore, Maryland, United States
- Founded: 1999
- Language: International
- Website: http://www.mdfilmfest.com

The Maryland Film Festival is an annual five-day international film festival taking place each March in Baltimore, Maryland. The festival was launched in 1999, and presents international film and video work of all lengths and genres. The festival is known for its close relationship with John Waters, who is on the festival's board of directors and selects a favorite film to host within each year of the festival.

Each American feature screened within the festival is hosted by one or more of its filmmakers. The many internationally known filmmakers who have presented their work within Maryland Film Festival include Barry Levinson, David Simon, Kathryn Bigelow, Melvin Van Peebles, Lena Dunham, Lisandro Alonso, Bobcat Goldthwait, Amy Seimetz, David Lowery, Joe Swanberg, Greta Gerwig, Barry Jenkins, Todd Solondz, Anna Biller, and Jonathan Demme.

In addition to forty or more new features and fifty or more new short films, each Maryland Film Festival includes one favorite film selected and hosted by legendary filmmaker and MFF board member John Waters. The films presented by John Waters within Maryland Film Festival have ranged from Joseph Losey's Boom! to Gaspar Noé's I Stand Alone.

Major names in contemporary music have presented favorite films within the festival, including Beach House, Dan Deacon, Branford Marsalis, Marin Alsop, Ian MacKaye, Will Oldham, Jonathan Richman, Bill Callahan, and members of Animal Collective. Each festival also includes a silent film with a live score by Alloy Orchestra. Additionally, personalities ranging from Harry Belafonte to Cal Ripken Jr. have appeared at the festival alongside documentaries about their lives and work.

The festival also programs film events in and around Baltimore year-round, including the film component of Baltimore's annual summer Artscape festival and many events for its membership support group Friends of the Festival.

== Festival history ==
The first Maryland Film Festival screening took place Thursday, April 22, 1999, with an Opening Night presentation of Barry Levinson's documentary Diner Guys (about the real-life inspirations for his first feature film, Diner) at the historic Senator Theatre.

Full programming began April 23, 1999, using all five screens of the historic Charles Theatre. These screenings were the first public use of the newly renovated Charles, which had expanded from one to five screens.

In 2002, the festival dedicated its Opening Night to a collection of short films, and had done so each year since 2004.

In 2009, the festival expanded its offerings of international films, with the stated goal of expanding the scope of international films brought to Baltimore, and in future years bringing a filmmaker to host each foreign feature film screening as the festival does with all American-made feature films.

In 2013, the festival announced its expansion to five days, shifting its Opening Night to Wednesday, May 8, 2013. Previous festivals had been four days, with opening nights taking place on Thursdays. The festival continued as a five-day festival in each subsequent edition.

The 18th annual festival took place May 4–8, 2016, using five screens in and around the Station North Arts and Entertainment District as well as the auditoriums of the Baltimore Museum of Art and Walters Art Museum.

The 19th annual festival took place May 4–7, 2017, using the three screens of the newly restored and expanded Parkway Theatre as well as three additional screens on the nearby Maryland Institute College of Art (MICA) campus.

The festival's feature-film programming has emphasized independent films represented by their filmmakers, as well as international works handled by such art-house and specialty film distributors as The Cinema Guild, Oscilloscope Laboratories, Factory 25, Milestone Films, Strand Releasing, and Kino.

The festival has offered the world premieres of such American independent features as Eugene Kotlyarenko's 0s & 1s (2010), Josephine Decker's Butter on the Latch (2013), Stephen Cone's Henry Gamble's Birthday Party (2015), Josh Crockett's Dr. Brinks & Dr. Brinks (2017) and Stephen Cone's Princess Cyd (2017). The 2017 edition featured the U.S. premieres of Hugh Gibson's The Stairs and Ashley McKenzie's Werewolf.

The festival launched a year-round, three-screen venue anchored by a historic, restored 1915 auditorium, The Parkway Theatre, in May 2017.

In November 2022, it was announced that Maryland Film Festival would not hold a 2023 edition, explaining that the festival would "recalibrate its business model amid major changes in the film industry."

The Maryland Film Festival returned in 2024 for a celebration of its 25th anniversary with KJ Mohr as the festival's new director of programming. Opening night was marked by a proclamation from Governor Wes Moore that May 2 was to be from then on "Maryland Film Festival Day." Highlights included Luther: Never Too Much, a documentary about legendary R&B musician Luther Vandross produced by Jamie Foxx with a Q&A with director Dawn Porter; an outdoor screening of Trans Shorts program hosted by Mickey R Mahoney and Lilly Wachowski, and a series of special retrospective screenings showcasing highlights from the festival's history. MdFF also launched CineTech, featuring new tech-forward programming with exploration of cinema and emerging technologies.

The 26th Maryland Film Festival ran November 5-9, 2025, under the leadership of the new executive director, Nancy Proctor. Highlights included Sun Ra: Do the Impossible, Christine Turner's Baltimore-connected documentary she first caught at Philly’s BlackStar Festival; Junkie, William Means’ feature debut that evolved from shorts work with MdFF; and Powwow People, Sky Hopinka’s experimental film that captures both cultural specificity and artistic invention. This edition of the festival launched student film summits, a dedicated Student Film Day, and a pipeline of student programming interns starting as early as middle school.

The 27th Maryland Film Festival was held April 8-12, 2026. Highlights included the world premiere of Crippled, a Baltimore production ten years in the making about a man living with muscular dystrophy – a horror film about his metaphorical journey of dealing with negligent nursing staff; the mid-Atlantic premiere of If I Go Will They Miss Me, the story of a 12-year-old boy in Los Angeles who turns his LAX neighborhood into his personal living mythological world, starring J. Alphonse Nicholson; the mid-Atlantic premiere of Kikuyu Land, set in Kenya's tea highlands about a man whose attempts to reclaim land and pursue justice for his family that turns into a deeper historical and personal conflict.

== The Parkway Theatre ==
In December 2013, the festival announced its plans to restore The Parkway Theatre, located at North Avenue and North Charles Street in the Station North Arts and Entertainment District, for use as its year-round venue. The Parkway was built for film exhibition in 1915, and became one of Baltimore's first art-house movie theaters in the 1950s, operating under the name Five West, but it closed in 1977. Maryland Film Festival's restoration preserved the original auditorium, and built two smaller screens in an adjacent space.

In Spring 2017, the Parkway restoration project was completed and the theater opened on May 3, 2017, with the opening night of the 19th Annual Maryland Film Festival The first public screening in The Parkway was the Opening Night Shorts Program of the 2017 Maryland Film Festival on the evening of May 3, 2017, hosted by Josephine Decker and Kris Swanberg and the directors of each short film presented. The first short presented, and therefore the first film to play in The Parkway in decades, was Jessica Kingdon's Commodity City. The other shorts presented that evening were Terence Nance's They Charge For the Sun, Jeannie Donohoe's Game, Matthew Salton's Richard Twice, and Nathan Truesdell's Balloonfest. The first feature film screened in the Parkway was Barry Levinson's television film The Wizard of Lies on the afternoon of Thursday, May 4, 2017. The first theatrical film screened in the Parkway, Theo Anthony's Rat Film the same evening, was also a part of the Maryland Film Festival. The first 35mm film screened in the Parkway was Agnès Varda's Vagabond, guest-curated and hosted by the band Beach House, on the evening of Saturday, May 6, 2017. These screenings all took place within Maryland Film Festival 2017. The first live music performance in the restored Parkway was Alloy Orchestra's live score for the German silent film Variety within Maryland Film Festival 2017 on Sunday, May 7.

Films shown at the 2022 event included Navalny, Sirens, and Homebody.

The Parkway Theater closed in January 2023, but announced in May 2024 that it would re-open to host the 25th Maryland Film Festival.

== Closing night films ==
Year	Film	Hosted By
2003	Standing in the Shadows of Motown	members of The Funk Brothers
2004	BAADASSSSS!	Mario Van Peebles and Melvin Van Peebles
2005	Swimmers	Doug Sadler
2006	The Eagle with live score by Alloy Orchestra	Alloy Orchestra
2007	Rocket Science	Jeffrey Blitz
2008	Confessionsofa Ex-Doofus-ItchyFooted Mutha	Melvin Van Peebles
2009	The Hurt Locker	Kathryn Bigelow and Mark Boal
2010	Mother and Child	Rodrigo García
2011	Sing Your Song	Harry Belafonte
2012	Dark Horse	Todd Solondz and Jordan Gelber
2013	Mother of George	Andrew Dosunmu and Bradford Young
2014	Little Accidents	Sara Colangelo
2015	The Wolfpack	Crystal Moselle
2016	Hunter Gatherer	Josh Locy and Andre Royo
2017	The Hero	Brett Haley
2018	All Square	John Hyams
2019	Luce	Julius Onah
2020	N/A	N/A
2021	Women Is Losers	Lissette Feliciano
2022	Becoming Fredrick Douglass & Harriet Tubman: Visions of Freedom	Stanley Nelson Jr. and Nicole London
2026	Misper	Harry Sheriff

== John Waters picks ==
Within every Maryland Film Festival since its launch in 1999, filmmaker and Maryland Film Festival board member John Waters has selected one film to present to an audience. His selections have ranged from vintage cult and camp titles to contemporary ribald comedies and art-house dramas.

Festival Year	Film title	Film director	Year of release	Notes
1999	Boom!	Joseph Losey	1968	
2000	Clean, Shaven	Lodge Kerrigan	1993	
2001	Baxter	Jérôme Boivin	1989	
2002	Fuego	Armando Bó	1969	
2003	I Stand Alone	Gaspar Noé	1998	Waters also joined in the MFF 2003 presentation of Noé's Irréversible.
2004	Dog Days	Ulrich Seidl	2001	
2005	Porn Theater	Jacques Nolot	2002	
2006	Head-On	Fatih Akın	2004	
2007	Sleeping Dogs Lie	Bobcat Goldthwait	2006	
2008	Story of Women	Claude Chabrol	1988	
2009	Love Songs	Christophe Honoré	2006	
2010	United 93	Paul Greengrass	2006	
2011	Domain	Patric Chiha	2009	Waters was joined in his presentation by director Patric Chiha.
2012	Wanda	Barbara Loden	1970	This screening took place from UCLA's restored 35mm print on the evening of Friday May 4, 2012.
2013	Paradise: Faith	Ulrich Seidl	2012	This screening took place the evening of Friday, May 10, 2012. Waters was joined in his presentation by star Maria Hofstätter. This marked the first time Waters has repeated a director in making his selections since the launch of MFF in 1999.
2014	Abuse of Weakness	Catherine Breillat	2014	
2015	Killer Joe	William Friedkin	2011	
2016	The Deep Blue Sea	Terence Davies	2011	
2017	Roar	Noel Marshall	1981	
2018	I, Olga Hepnarová	Tomáš Weinreb and Petr Kazda	2016	
2019	Mom and Dad	Brian Taylor	2017	
2020	N/A	N/A	N/A	The 2020 Maryland Film Festival, was cancelled due to the COVID-19 pandemic.
2021	Why Don't You Just Die! and The Road Movie	Kirill Sokolov and Dmitrii Kalashnikov, respectively	2018 and 2016, respectively	Presented as "John Waters' Russian Shock Night at the Drive-In", a double-feature hosted by Waters at the Druid Hill Park Mansion Lawn.
2022	Maps to the Stars	David Cronenberg	2014	This film was to be presented by Waters at the in-person 2020 Maryland Film Festival, which was cancelled due to the COVID-19 pandemic.

Festival Year	Guest Host	Film title	Film director	Notes
1999	Kurt Schmoke	The Godfather	Francis Ford Coppola	
1999	Marc Steiner	The Cool World	Shirley Clarke	
2000	Jonathan Richman	Cyrano de Bergerac	Michael Gordon	
2000	Joyce Scott	The Long, Hot Summer	Martin Ritt	
2000	Taylor Branch	One-Eyed Jacks	Marlon Brando	
2000	J.D. Considine	The Great Rock 'n' Roll Swindle	Julien Temple	
2000	Scott Erickson	Predator	John McTiernan	
2001	Will Oldham	The World's Greatest Sinner	Timothy Carey	
2001	Herschell Gordon Lewis	The Gore Gore Girls and 2,000 Maniacs	Herschell Gordon Lewis	
2001	Martin O'Malley	Into the West	Mike Newell	
2002	Julian Bond	Sweet Sweetback's Baadasssss Song	Melvin Van Peebles	Bond was joined in his presentation by director Melvin Van Peebles, who delivered his own print of the film for the screening.
2003	Barry Levinson	On the Waterfront	Elia Kazan	This screening was the Opening Night selection for MFF 2003, held in the historic Senator Theater.
2003	Margaret Carlson	Notorious	Alfred Hitchcock	
2004	Marc Steiner	The Battle of Algiers	Gillo Pontecorvo	
2005	Dorothy Hamill	Mary Poppins	Robert Stevenson	The audience was encouraged to sing along with the songs for this screening.
2005	Harvey Pekar	The Bicycle Thief	Vittorio De Sica	
2005	Barbara Mikulski	To Kill a Mockingbird	Robert Mulligan	
2006	Branford Marsalis	The Scent of Green Papaya	Tran Anh Hung	
2007	Lodge Kerrigan	A Sense of Loss	Marcel Ophüls	
2007	Henry Rollins	Maxed Out	James Scurlock	
2009	Ian MacKaye	Nina Simone: La Légende	Frank Lords	The famed post-punk musician (of Minor Threat, Fugazi, The Evens, and Dischord Records) presented a rare screening of this 1992 French documentary about Nina Simone.
2009	Laura Lippman	Funny Bones	Peter Chelsom	
2010	Bill Callahan	Faces	John Cassavetes	Callahan (formerly known as Smog), read an original, poetic appreciation piece for this landmark 1968 independent film. He was joined in his presentation by Al Ruban, the film's cinematographer and frequent Cassavetes collaborator.
2010	Dan Deacon	Total Recall	Paul Verhoeven	This screening led to a subsequent year-round Maryland Film Fest series called Gunky's Basemement featuring 35mm prints of films selected and hosted by Dan Deacon and Jimmy Joe Roche.
2011	Marin Alsop	The Good, the Bad, and the Ugly	Sergio Leone	A 35mm presentation of this 1966 Sergio Leone Spaghetti Western noted for its Ennio Morricone score, hosted by the music director of the Baltimore Symphony Orchestra.
2011	members of Animal Collective	The Boxer's Omen, aka Mo	Chih-Hung Kuei	Avey Tare, Deakin, and Geologist hosted this 1983 Shaw Brothers production, and noted that another favorite film of the group was House.
2013	Frank Bruni	Absence of Malice	Sydney Pollack	
2014	Matmos	Barbarella	Roger Vadim	The Baltimore-based electronic-music duo will present the film from which they derived their band name.
2014	DJ Spooky	Putney Swope	Robert Downey, Sr.	
2015	Alan Resnick and Dina Kelberman	Showgirls	Paul Verhoeven	
2015	Abdu Ali	Do the Right Thing	Spike Lee	
2016	DeRay Mckesson	Fresh	Boaz Yakin	
2017	Beach House	Vagabond	Agnès Varda	The Baltimore-based duo's introduction on Saturday, May 6, 2017 marked the first 35mm print presented in the newly restored Parkway Theatre.

== Silent Films with Live Film Score ==
A tradition of the Maryland Film Festival beginning in 2003 has been a silent film presented with a live score. Alloy Orchestra performed scores from 2003- 2018 and also presented films at Maryland Film Festival stand-alone events throughout the year; this list is limited to presentations within the annual festival weekend.

Festival Year	Film title	Film director	Year of Original Release
2003	The Black Pirate	Albert Parker	1926
2004	Speedy	Ted Wilde	1928
2005	Blackmail	Alfred Hitchcock	1929
2006	The Eagle	Clarence Brown	1925
2007	Nosferatu	F. W. Murnau	1922
2008	Underworld	Josef von Sternberg	1927
2009	Man with a Movie Camera	Dziga Vertov	1929
2010	Chang: A Drama of the Wilderness	Merian C. Cooper and Ernest B. Schoedsack	1927
2011	"Masters of Slapstick" Shorts Program	Charlie Chaplin, Roscoe Arbuckle and Buster Keaton	1916-1920
2012	From Morning Till Midnight	Karlheinz Martin	1920
2013	The Lost World	Harry O. Hoyt	1925
2014	He Who Gets Slapped	Victor Sjöström	1924
2015	The Son of the Sheik	George Fitzmaurice	1926
2016	L'Inhumaine	Marcel L'Herbier	1924
2017	Variety	E. A. Dupont	1925
2018	A Page of Madness	Teinosuke Kinugasa	1926
2026	Piccadilly (film)	E. A. Dupont	1929

== Vintage 3-D film presentations ==
Beginning in 2002 and extending through 2012, each Maryland Film Festival presented a vintage 3D film in the two-projector 35mm format. Each screening was hosted by Baltimore Sun film writer Chris Kaltenbach.

Festival Year	Film title	Film director	Year of Original Release
2002	House of Wax	André de Toth	1953
2003	Creature from the Black Lagoon	Jack Arnold	1954
2004	Fort Ti	William Castle	1953
2005	Gorilla at Large	Harmon Jones	1954
2006	The Mad Magician	John Brahm	1954
2007	Man in the Dark	Lew Landers	1953
2008	Miss Sadie Thompson	Curtis Bernhardt	1953
2009	Inferno	Roy Ward Baker	1953
2010	Jesse James vs. The Daltons	William Castle	1954
2011	The Stranger Wore a Gun	André de Toth	1953
2012	Those Redheads from Seattle	Lewis R. Foster	1953

== List of features played at the festival ==
Each Maryland Film Festival has presented forty or more feature films, with the screenings of each American film hosted by one of its filmmakers.

Year	Films
1999	Arlington Road, The Brandon Teena Story, The Cool World, Crime Wave, Divine Trash, Hands on a Hard Body, Lovers of the Arctic Circle, Mary Jane's Not a Virgin Anymore, My Son the Fanatic, Radiohead: Meeting People Is Easy, The Saltmen of Tibet, Without Limits
2000	The Corner, Forbidden Zone, I Am Cuba, Kill by Inches, King Gimp, Panic, Paradise Lost 2: Revelations, Wattstax
2001	The American Astronaut, Investigation of a Flame, Mutant Aliens, Plaster Caster, Portrait of Jason, Startup.com, Sun Ra: A Joyful Noise, Unfinished Symphony: Democracy and Dissent
2002	Blue Vinyl, Charlotte Sometimes, Cyberman, Derrida, The Execution of Wanda Jean, Freestyle: The Art of Rhyme, How to Draw a Bunny, Paperboys, Soft For Digging
2003	BaadAsssss Cinema, Capturing the Friedmans, Funny Ha Ha, Horns and Halos, Hukkle, Irréversible, L'Auberge Espagnole, Melvin Goes to Dinner, The Mudge Boy, Stevie, Unprecedented
2004	The Agronomist, BAADASSSSS!, Born into Brothels, High Tension, Imelda, Metallica: Some Kind of Monster, The Saddest Music in the World, Saved!, Travellers and Magicians, Word Wars
2005	9 Songs, The Aristocrats, The Boys of Baraka, The Edukators, Enron: The Smartest Guys in the Room, Mad Hot Ballroom, Me and You and Everyone We Know, Murderball, Mutual Appreciation, Palindromes, Street Fight
2006	12 and Holding, Darkon, Head-On, The Guatemalan Handshake, Hamilton, LOL, My Country, My Country, We Go Way Back
2007	Brand Upon the Brain!, Crazy Love, Frownland, Great World of Sound, Hannah Takes the Stairs, I Don't Want to Sleep Alone, Killer of Sheep, The Last Days of Left Eye, Murder Party, My Nappy Roots, On a Tightrope, Quiet City, Silver Jew, Sleeping Dogs Lie, Syndromes and a Century, Viva, War/Dance, Zoo
2008	American Teen, At the Death House Door, Baghead, Bamako, Beautiful Losers, The Betrayal, Bi the Way, The Black List, Chop Shop, Goliath, Gonzo: The Life and Work of Dr. Hunter S. Thompson, I.O.U.S.A., Medicine for Melancholy, Momma's Man, My Effortless Brilliance, Nights and Weekends, Woodpecker
2009	Alexander the Last, The Beaches of Agnès, Beetle Queen Conquers Tokyo, Daytime Drinking, Garbage Dreams, Greek Pete, The Hurt Locker, Lake Tahoe, Make-out with Violence, Modern Love Is Automatic, Munyurangabo, Nollywood Babylon, Not Quite Hollywood, Stingray Sam, Treeless Mountain, World's Greatest Dad
2010	12th & Delaware, And Everything Is Going Fine, Beijing Taxi, Casino Jack and the United States of Money, Cold Weather, Cyrus, Daddy Longlegs, Dogtooth, Freedom Riders, La Pivellina, Liverpool, Music by Prudence, Night Catches Us, The Oath, Putty Hill, Tiny Furniture, Until the Light Takes Us, Wheedle's Groove, Wuss
2011	Better This World, The Catechism Cataclysm, The Color Wheel, The Dish & the Spoon, If a Tree Falls, The Interrupters, Last Days Here, Magic Trip, Meek's Cutoff, My Joy, Ne Change Rien, Nostalgia for the Light, Restless City, Septien, Silver Bullets, Terri, Uncle Boonmee Who Can Recall His Past Lives, A Useful Life, Viva Riva!, Weekend, We Were Here
2012	Attenberg, Come Back, Africa, The Comedy, Compliance, Dark Horse, Ethel, Detropia, Gayby, God Bless America, Jeff, Kid-Thing, Love Free Or Die, Lovely Molly, LUV, Once Upon a Time in Anatolia, Oslo, August 31st, The Patron Saints, Pilgrim Song, Porfirio, Reconvergence, Save the Date, The Source Family, Sun Don't Shine, Supporting Characters, Tchoupitoulas, This Is Not a Film, The Turin Horse, Under African Skies, V/H/S, Vito, Volcano, Wild in the Streets, Wuthering Heights
2013	12 O'Clock Boys, 16 Acres, Aatsinki, After Tiller, Augustine, Before You Know It, Berberian Sound Studio, Bluebird, Boy Eating the Bird's Food, Butter on the Latch, By and By, Computer Chess, Downloaded, Drinking Buddies, Fill the Void, Good Ol' Freda, Here Comes the Devil, Hit & Stay, I Am Divine, I Used to Be Darker, If We Shout Loud Enough, It Felt Like Love, Leviathan, Mother of George, Museum Hours, Paradise: Faith, Paradise: Hope, Paradise: Love, The Pervert's Guide to Ideology, Pit Stop, Post Tenebras Lux, Prince Avalanche, The Rambler, Remote Area Medical, Swim Little Fish Swim, A Teacher, This Is Martin Bonner, Touchy Feely, V/H/S/2, Watchtower, We Always Lie to Strangers, White Reindeer, Willow Creek, Zero Charisma
2014	Abuse of Weakness, Actress, Approaching the Elephant, Appropriate Behavior, Art and Craft, The Auction, Baltimore in Black and White, Brewmore | Baltimore, Buzzard, Call Girl of Cthulhu, The Case Against 8, Celestial Wives of the Meadow Mari, Club Sandwich, Deep City: The Birth of the Miami Sound, Everybody Street, Evolution of a Criminal, Faults, Fight Church, Fort Tilden, Freedom Summer, Glena, Happy Christmas, Hellion, The Hip-Hop Fellow, I Play with the Phrase Each Other, Kumiko, the Treasure Hunter, Manakamana, The Mend, The Militant, Moebius, Obvious Child, Ping Pong Summer, Point and Shoot, September, Positive Force: More Than a Witness, The Strange Little Cat, Stray Dogs, Summer of Blood, Thou Wast Mild and Lovely, The Vanquishing of the Witch Baba Yaga, Water Like Stone, Welcome to Deathfest, Whitey: United States of America v. James J. Bulger, Who Took Johnny, Wild Canaries, Young Bodies Heal Quickly
2015	6 Years, Beats of the Antonov, Best of Enemies, The Black Panthers: Vanguard of the Revolution, Breaking a Monster, Call Me Lucky, Christmas, Again, Crocodile Gennadiy, Deep Web, Digging for Fire, Drunk Stoned Brilliant Dead, Entertainment, Field Niggas, For the Plasma, Frame by Frame, Funny Bunny, A Gay Girl in Damascus: The Amina Profile, Girlhood, God Bless the Child, Henry Gamble's Birthday Party, In the Basement, Jauja, Limbo, People, Places, Things, Prophet's Prey, The Reaper, Rebels of the Neon God, Results, Sailing a Sinking Sea, Stinking Heaven, Tab Hunter Confidential, Tired Moonlight, Two Shots Fired, Uncle Kent 2, Unexpected, Venice, Welcome to Leith, Western, The Wolfpack, A Wonderful Cloud
2016	Always Shine; The Apostate; Boone; Cameraperson; Cemetery of Splendor; Chevalier; collective:unconscious; Donald Cried; Do Not Resist; The Fits; Fraud; The Greasy Strangler; The Guys Next Door; He Hated Pigeons; High Rise; Hotel Dallas; How Heavy This Hammer; Hunter Gatherer, Ixcanul; Koza; Lamb; The Legend of Swee' Pea; Life, Animated; Little Men; Little Sister; Lovesong; The Love Witch; MA; The Master Cleanse; Morris From America; No Home Movie; Norman Lear: Just Another Version of You; Nuts!; Orange Sunshine; Salero; Shu-De!; Slash; A Stray; Trapped; Under the Shadow; Untouchable
2017	Austerlitz; Beach Rats; The Blood Is at the Doorstep; The Departure; Dr. Brinks & Dr. Brinks; Family Life; Finding Joseph I: The HR From Bad Brains Documentary; Golden Exits; Hermia & Helena; The Hero; The Human Surge; Intent to Destroy; Kékszakállú; Lemon; The Little Hours; Love After Love; Maineland; Mimosas; Motherland; Park; Person to Person; Princess Cyd; Rat Film; Roar; The Stairs; The Strange Ones; Sylvio; Tell Them We Are Rising; Thirst Street; Vagabond; Variety; Werewolf; Whose Streets?; The Wizard of Lies
2018	August at Akiko's; The Pain of Others; Alanis; Damsel; Charm City; Clara's Ghost; Black Mother; Caniba; First Reformed; Madeline's Madeline; Matangi/Maya/M.I.A.; On Her Shoulders; Shakedown; Sickies Making Films; Sollers Point; Strangely Ordinary This Devotion; Let the Corpses Tan; Time Trial; We the Animals; Wobble Palace; Won't You Be My Neighbor?
2019	American Factory; Abessa; The Art of Self-Defense; Before You Know It; Being Impossible; The Big Bad Fox and Other Tales...; Boy Howdy! The Story of CREEM Magazine; Cold Case Hammarskjöld; Decade of Fire; Donbass; Don't Be a Dick About It; Fig Tree; For Sama; Frances Fergusson; The Gospel According to Al Green; Greener Grass; Ham on Rye; The Hottest August; In Fabric; Knives and Skin; Lost Holiday

== Gunky's Basement Film series ==
Gunky’s Basement was a Maryland Film Festival series curated and hosted by musician Dan Deacon, video artist Jimmy Joe Roche, and MdFF programmer Eric Allen Hatch. Each title screened from a 35mm print and was promoted in part with original screenprinted posters created by Baltimore-based artists.

Gunky’s Basement was a year-round extension of the Maryland Film Festival Guest-Host program, in which a person best known for work outside the world of film selects and hosts a favorite film. Prior to Gunky’s Basement, Dan Deacon was a guest host in Maryland Film Festival 2010, selecting Total Recall.

The series originally took place in The Charles Theatre. Beginning with the July 12, 2017, screening of The Shining, all Gunky's Basement screenings took place in Maryland Film Festival's year-round venue, The Parkway Theatre. The series came to a close when film curator Eric Allen Hatch departed MdFF in February, 2018.

Date	Film title	Film director	Year of release
October 21, 2010	The Thing	John Carpenter	1982
December 9, 2010	Repo Man	Alex Cox	1984
January 27, 2011	Alien	Ridley Scott	1979
March 3, 2011	Beetlejuice	Tim Burton	1988
April 21, 2011	Who Framed Roger Rabbit	Robert Zemeckis	1988
September 27, 2011	Starship Troopers	Paul Verhoeven	1997
October 25, 2011	Videodrome	David Cronenberg	1983
November 29, 2011	Dune	David Lynch	1984
December 13, 2011	Groundhog Day	Harold Ramis	1993
July 18, 2012	They Live	John Carpenter	1988
August 15, 2012	The Silence of the Lambs	Jonathan Demme	1991
December 4, 2012	Twin Peaks: Fire Walk With Me	David Lynch	1992
January 9, 2013	Manhunter	Michael Mann	1986
February 6, 2013	Die Hard	John McTiernan	1988
March 6, 2013	Dead Man	Jim Jarmusch	1995
October 30, 2013	In the Mouth of Madness	John Carpenter	1995
November 13, 2013	Point Break	Kathryn Bigelow	1991
December 4, 2013	Terminator 2: Judgment Day	James Cameron	1991
February 26, 2014	Batman	Tim Burton	1989
July 12, 2017	The Shining	Stanley Kubrick	1980
August 9, 2017	Little Shop of Horrors	Frank Oz	1986
September 27, 2017	RoboCop	Paul Verhoeven	1987
November 8, 2017	Something Wild	Jonathan Demme	1986
December 6, 2017	The Running Man	Paul Michael Glaser	1987
February 28, 2018	American Psycho	Mary Harron	2000

=== Night Zones with Jimmy Joe Roche ===
As an offshoot of Gunky's Basement, Maryland Film Festival and video artist Jimmy Joe Roche partnered for a series exploring Roche's love of horror films. As with Gunky's Basement, each title screened from a 35mm print, and was promoted in part with original screenprinted posters created by a Baltimore artist.

Date	Film title	Film director	Year of release
September 26, 2012	Lifeforce	Tobe Hooper	1985
October 31, 2012	The Texas Chain Saw Massacre	Tobe Hooper	1974
November 28, 2012	From Beyond	Stuart Gordon	1986
October 7, 2015	Brainscan	John Flynn	1994
October 14, 2015	Slither	James Gunn	2006
October 28, 2015	Phantasm II	Don Coscarelli	1988
