= North Central Historic District =

North Central Historic District can refer to:

- North Central Historic District (Alexandria City, Alabama), listed on the NRHP in Alabama
- North Central Avenue Streetscape Historic District, Phoenix, AZ, listed on the NRHP in Arizona
- North Central Historic District (Baltimore, Maryland), listed on the NRHP in Maryland
