= Hamilton (2006 film) =

- Directed by: Matthew Porterfield
- Screenplay by: Matthew Porterfield
- Produced by: Jordan Mintzer
- Starring: Christopher H. Myers; Stephanie Vizzi
- Cinematography: Jeremy Saulnier
- Edited by: Matthew Porterfield
- Production company: The Hamilton Film Group
- Distributed by: The Hamilton Film Group
- Release date: April 2, 2006
- Running time: 65 minutes
- Country: United States
- Language: English

Hamilton is a 2006 American independent drama film directed by Matthew Porterfield, set and shot in Baltimore, Maryland. The film was screened at several international film festivals, including the Maryland Film Festival. It was released on DVD by The Cinema Guild as part of a two-disc set with Porterfield's second feature, Putty Hill, on November 8, 2011.

== Plot ==
The film's plot deals with two accidental parents and how they manage to work their lives around being premature parents.

== Cast ==
- Christopher H. Myers as Joe
- Stephanie Vizzi as Lena
- Sarah Siepp-Williams as Candace
- Gina Christine Mooers as Linda
- Jasmine Bazinet-Phillips as Courtney
- Megan Clark as April
- Madeleine Saar Reeser as Adeline
- Tiffany Boone as Briana
- Marie Collins as Marie
- Sarah Jane Gerrish as Vicky

== Production ==
Principal photography mostly took place in Baltimore, Maryland.

== Release ==
The film was released at the Wisconsin Film Festival on April 2, 2006.

=== Home media ===
The film was released on DVD on November 8, 2011

== Reception ==
The film has an 83% on Rotten Tomatoes based on 6 reviews. In 2009, the film was named one of the best films of the 2000s by The New Yorker. In 2017, Richard Brody for The New Yorker listed Hamilton as one of the "25 Best Films of the 21st Century So Far."
