= Tina Benko =

American actress

- Born: Pittsburgh, Pennsylvania, U.S.
- Occupation: Actress
- Years active: 1992–present

Tina Benko is an American actress and acting teacher known for her roles in film, theatre, and television acting. She has appeared in numerous productions on and off Broadway, including A Midsummer Night's Dream. In addition to her stage work, she has also appeared in several TV series, including Flesh and Bone, The Good Wife, Brotherhood, the AMC TV series, Turn: Washington's Spies and in films such as The Adults.

== Early life ==
Benko was born in Pittsburgh, Pennsylvania.

== Career ==
Benko was nominated for a Lucille Lortel Award for her portrayal of Jacqueline Kennedy Onassis in Elfriede Jelinek's solo work Jackie in 2013 at the New York City Center. She won the St. Clair Bayfield Award for playing Titania in Julie Taymor's production of A Midsummer Night's Dream at Theatre for a New Audience. In 2019, she appeared in the off-Broadway play Eureka Day.

Benko teaches at HB Studio and Fordham University. Benko also narrated Peter de Jonge's novel Shadows Still Remain.

== Filmography ==
=== Film ===
Year	Title	Role	Notes
1992	Waterland	Baby's Mother	
1995	Houseguest	Waitress	
2001	Final	Blonde in Bar	
2002	Crazy Little Thing	Bartender	
2004	Company K	Hope	
2006	Puccini for Beginners	Nell	
2007	The Killing Floor	Executive #2	
2007	The Nanny Diaries	Shopaholic Mom	
2008	Lucky Days	Nina	
2009	The Hungry Ghosts	Abby	
2012	The Avengers	NASA Scientist	
2013	Admission	Andrea	Uncredited
2013	Contest	Rhonda	
2014	That Awkward Moment	Ellie's Mom	
2014	Julie Taymor's A Midsummer Night's Dream	Titania	
2015	Irrational Man	TV Announcer	
2017	The Two Worlds of William March	Hope	
2017	The Greatest Showman	Mrs. Winthrop	
2018	Mapplethorpe	Sandy Daley	
2018	Can You Ever Forgive Me?	Karen	
2018	Hot Air	Laurie	
2019	The Sound of Silence	Dr. Elizabeth Brookings	
2019	FAIR MARKET VALUE	Brooke	
2019	The Kitchen	Donna	
2020	The Scottish Play	Sydney	
2022	Life After You	Mary	
2023	The Adults	Christina	
2024	Nobody Wants to Shoot a Woman	Mary	
2026	The Betrayers		

=== Television ===
Year	Title	Role	Notes
1993	The Fire Next Time	Wendy Richter	Episode #1.2
1995	New York Undercover	Sarah Chapman	Episode: "The Highest Bidder"
1995	New York News	Amanda	Episode: "The Using Game"
1999	Third Watch	Vanessa	Episode: "Responsible Parties"
1999, 2012	Law & Order: SVU	Grace Avery / Mrs. Panachek	2 episodes
2002, 2010	Law & Order: Criminal Intent	Mrs. O'Doyle / Susan Rowan	2 episodes
2003	Chappelle's Show	Katie Jacobson	Episode: "O'Dweeds & Trading Spouses"
2005, 2009	Law & Order	Carrie Sands / Sharon Quaid	2 episodes
2006–2008	Brotherhood	Kathleen Parry	18 episodes
2008	New Amsterdam	Amelia	Episode: "Legacy"
2009	Ugly Betty	Collette	Episode: "Sisters on the Verge of a Nervous Breakdown"
2012	Royal Pains	Titania	Episode: "Bottoms Up"
2012	Unforgettable	Lois Sadler	Episode: "A Man in the Woods"
2015	The Mysteries of Laura	Judith Hansen	Episode: "The Mystery of the Frozen Foodie"
2015	Person of Interest	Cobb	Episode: "Guilty"
2015	Blue Bloods	Lauren Vickers	Episode: "Occupational Hazards"
2015	The Good Wife	Judith Dahl	Episode: "Loser Edit"
2015	Flesh and Bone	Jessica	8 episodes
2016	NCIS: New Orleans	Paulina Kurteva	Episode: "Sister City: Part II"
2016	Vinyl	Gloria	Episode: "Whispered Secrets"
2017	Royally	Hannah Harrowsmith	4 episodes
2017	Turn: Washington's Spies	Mrs. Barnes	7 episodes
2017	Rachel Unraveled	Maxine	Episode: "Intervention"
2017	Blindspot	Yasmine Petrushev	Episode: "This Profound Legacy"
2018	Unbreakable Kimmy Schmidt	Dr. Farpotshket	Episode: "Kimmy Meets an Old Friend!"
2020	FBI: Most Wanted	Sherry Bishop	Episode: "Predators"
2020	Monsterland	Marianne Westheart	Episode: "New York, New York"
2021	The Other Two	Phoebe McInerny Purmont	Episode: "Chase Becomes Co-Owner of the Nets"
2021	Power Book III: Raising Kanan	Dr. Ramona Nichols	4 episodes
2023	Kaleidoscope	Special Agent Jennifer Helman	2 episodes
2023	Dr. Death	Meredith Vieira	3 episodes
2024	FBI	Interpool Inspector Laurent	Episode: "Riptide"
2025	Elsbeth	Ava Mornier	2 episodes
