= Matthew Porterfield =

American independent filmmaker (born 1977)

Matt Porterfield
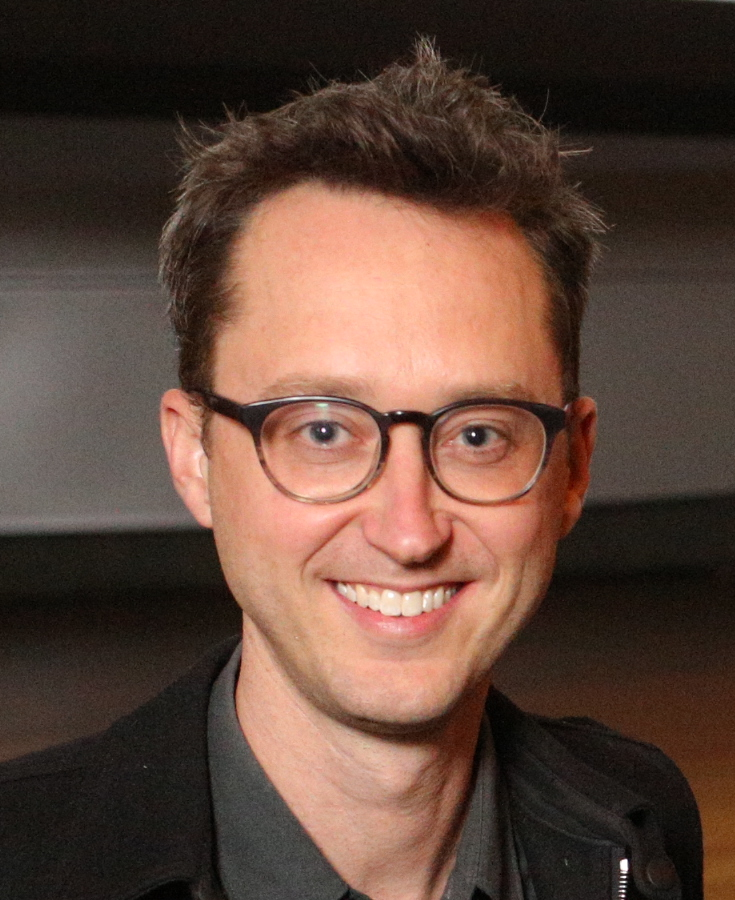
- Porterfield in 2016
- Born: Matthew Porterfield; October 6, 1977 (age 48); Baltimore, Maryland, U.S.
- Occupations: Film director, screenwriter, producer, lecturer
- Years active: 2006–present
- Website: https://www.mattporterfield.com/

Matthew "Matt" Porterfield (born October 6, 1977) is an American independent filmmaker. He has made four feature films to date, Hamilton (2006), Putty Hill (2011), I Used to Be Darker (2013) and Sollers Point (2017). Putty Hill and I Used to Be Darker had their international premieres at the Berlin International Film Festival. All of his features have had their local premieres at the Maryland Film Festival.

== Life and career ==
Porterfield was born in Baltimore, Maryland, and studied at the Tisch School of the Arts, New York University. He previously taught screenwriting and production in the Film and Media Studies Program at Johns Hopkins University.

His low-budget debut feature, Hamilton, made on 16 mm film with a cast of non-professional actors from Baltimore, proved a "minor miracle", wrote Richard Brody in The New Yorker. The magazine went on to tag the film as "the most original, moving and an accomplished American independent film in recent years".

Porterfield's Putty Hill again revolves around a small working class community in Baltimore city, combining documentary and narrative traditions. It was featured in the 2013 Whitney Biennial.

His 2013 feature, I Used to Be Darker, was co-written by Amy Belk and starred musicians Ned Oldham and Kim Taylor alongside newcomers Hannah Gross and Deragh Campbell. It premiered at the 2013 Sundance Film Festival and was released commercially in the United States, France, Germany, Austria, and South Korea.

Porterfield made his first narrative short, Take What You Can Carry, in Berlin in the summer of 2014. It premiered in the Berlinale Shorts Competition in 2015. His next feature film, Sollers Point, premiered at San Sebastián International Film Festival in 2017.

In 2019, Porterfield was awarded a Guggenheim Fellowship.

== Filmography ==
- 2006: Hamilton
- 2010: Putty Hill
- 2013: I Used to Be Darker
- 2015: Take What You Can Carry (short)
- 2017: Sollers Point
- 2021: Cuatro paredes (short)
- 2023: Extinction of the Species (short, co-directed with Nicolasa Ruiz)
- 2026: Ponderosa
- TBA: Solo Tengo Sed
