= Kim Taylor (musician) =

American independent singer-songwriter (born 1973)

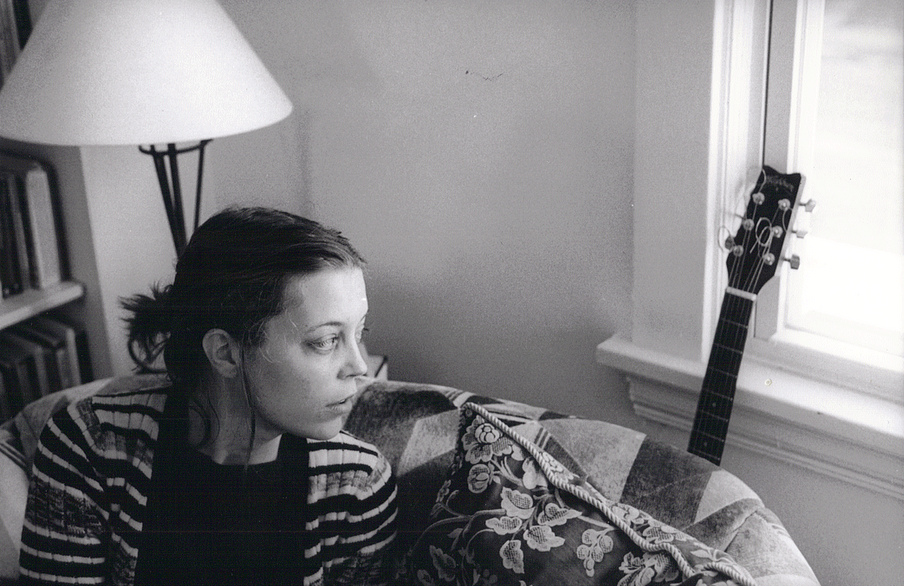
- Photo by David Strasser

Background information
- Born: December 20, 1973 (age 52); Miami, Florida
- Origin: Cincinnati, Ohio
- Genres: Folk, folk-influenced, singer-songwriter
- Occupations: Singer-songwriter, musician, actress
- Instruments: Vocals, guitar, piano
- Years active: 2002–present
- Label: Don't Darling Me
- Website: kim-taylor.net

Kim Taylor is an American independent singer-songwriter who plays primarily folk and folk-rock music.

To date, Taylor has released five full-length studio albums, toured with notable international artists, and embarked on an acting career which has garnered positive attention from critics and bloggers. Her first full-length film, I Used To Be Darker, premiered at the Sundance Festival in January 2013.

== Biography ==
=== Music career ===
Originally from Florida, Taylor played instruments in school bands and sang in church as a child. She began performing professionally at age 18. "I have always done music in some fashion," Taylor said. "I played piano as a kid and played flute in the marching band at Murray Middle School." In 1996, she relocated to Cincinnati to pursue an English degree, and entered the local music scene of the city.

After garnering positive word-of-mouth and promising reviews and radio play for her earliest releases, So Black, So Bright (2002) and Extended Play (2004), Taylor began work on what would become I Feel Like a Fading Light (2006). She also self-released a live album, Live at the Miramar (2002), around the release of her debut "So Black, So Bright".

I Feel Like A Fading Light was recorded in New York City alongside Jimi Zhivago, former guitarist for the roots music purveyors Ollabelle. The music was performed almost entirely by Taylor and Zhivago, except for drums (which were provided by Mars Volta's Blake Fleming, Devon Ashley of The Lemonheads and Those Young Lions, and local musician Josh Seurkamp). The album was released digitally, as well as on CD (however, they were only sold at shows). It was released on vinyl in December 2008. The album was at one point dubbed an "Album of the Week" on NPR's World Cafe (via WXPN/NPR Music).

After touring in support of the record, Taylor began work on a set of songs that would become the EP, The Greatest Story (2008). She recorded the EP with producer Mike Deneen (known for his work with Fountains of Wayne, Howie Day, and Aimee Mann) "That project is part of a bigger picture that I'll finish and release as a full length." Taylor told Paste magazine after being named "Best of What's Next" in 2009.

Taylor continued playing shows and festivals such as NYC's CMJ Music Marathon and returned to Austin's SXSW Music, this time promoting the EP. She toured extensively with Over the Rhine, Grace Potter and the Nocturnals, Ron Sexsmith, as well as with her friend, Lexington cellist Ben Sollee. Taylor and Sollee had done occasional shows together since 2007, but this tour found them playing both solo material, and accompanying one another during each other's sets.

In 2010, Taylor released Little Miracle. Written and recorded in just three days, it too was recorded with Jimi Zhivago. However, this time, all instruments were played by Taylor and Zhivago: "I always write on both piano and guitar. Piano was my first instrument. The new project is just me and my friend Jimi Zhivago (out of NYC and plays with the band Ollabelle.) We play everything on it: guitars, piano, organs, percussion, etc."

In 2013, Taylor worked again with Jimi Zhivago to release "Love's A Dog."

"Songs of Instruction"—Taylor's 5th full-length record and first co-production—was released on February 22, 2019.

=== Music in film and television ===
Taylor's songs have been included in such shows as Smallville, Justified, Eli Stone, One Tree Hill, Ghost Whisperer, Flashpoint, Army Wives, Hawthorne, The Unit, All My Children, and Days of Our Lives.

Taylor's songs "No More War" and "A Good Man" can also be found on the soundtrack for the 2005 film, My Brother's War.

In 2009, Taylor signed a nonexclusive licensing agreement with MTV so that the network could use her songs on some of their hit shows. Additionally, she struck a deal with Revlon in 2010, for her song "Little Miracle" to be used in an ad campaign.

In 2019, "The Hard Way" from Taylor's "Songs of Instruction" was used in the Chinese thriller film Sheep Without A Shepherd directed by Sam Quah.

In 2020, "The Hard Way" was used in the Chinese web series "Detective Chinatown."

=== Film ===
Taylor starred in director Matthew Porterfield's independent film, I Used to Be Darker, about a pregnant Northern Irish runaway who seeks refuge with family in Baltimore, MD, only to find her aunt on the verge of divorce. Taylor plays the aunt (who like Taylor, is a singer-songwriter named Kim). The film premiered in January 2013, at the Sundance Film Festival. It then gave its international film premiere at the Berlinale in Berlin, Germany in February 2013. To accompany the launch of the film, Taylor also performed at Sundance's ASCAP Cafe in January 2013.

The film was funded by use of the pledge-platform Kickstarter and began filming in August 2011.

The film was ranked as one of IndieWire's "Most Anticipated Indie Films of 2012" and is #27 on IONCINEMA's "Top 100 Most Anticipated Films of 2012" list. Post-premier, the film received positive reviews from such publications as The New Yorker and Time Out Chicago.

=== Personal life ===
Taylor was born in Miami, Florida. Her father grew up in Alexandria, Virginia, and her mother in Lakeland, Florida. Taylor's father was a PATCO air-traffic controller and is now president of the re-formed union. She is an only child.

Taylor is married and has one son.

For several years, Taylor also owned a much-loved coffee shop, Pleasant Perk, in Cincinnati. "The shop serves a lot of purposes for me," she says. "It quickly relieves the tension when I come back from playing music."

== Discography ==
=== Albums ===
- So Black, So Bright (2002)
- Live at the Miramar (2002)
- Extended Play (2004)
- I Feel Like a Fading Light (2006)
- Live at Canal Street Tavern (2008)
- Little Miracle (2010)
- Love's a Dog (2013)
- Songs of Instruction (2019)

=== Singles and EPs ===
- Extended Play (2004)
- The Greatest Story EP (2008)
- I Am You single (2008)
- Build You Up (2011)
- Benediction (2021)
- The Lights of Cincinnati (2024)

=== Soundtracks ===
- My Brother's War (2005)

== Awards and accolades ==
- 2002: "New Artist of the Year" – Cincinnati Entertainment Awards
- 2004: "Singer-Songwriter of the Year" – Cincinnati Entertainment Awards
- 2006: "Album of the Week" – NPR's World Cafe (via WXPN/NPR Music)
- 2006: "Singer-Songwriter of the Year" – Cincinnati Entertainment Awards
- 2007: "Top Records of 2007" – Performing Songwriter (magazine)
- 2007: "Singer-Songwriter of the Year" – Cincinnati Entertainment Awards
- 2008: "Singer-Songwriter of the Year" – Cincinnati Entertainment Awards
- 2009: "Best of What's Next" – Paste
- 2009: "Singer-Songwriter of the Year" – Cincinnati Entertainment Awards
- 2010: "Singer-Songwriter of the Year" – Cincinnati Entertainment Awards
- 2011 Her song "Build You Up" appeared in the movie CyberBully in 2011
