= Bad Fever =

Indie drama film by Dustin Guy Defa

- Theatrical release poster
- Directed by: Dustin Guy Defa
- Written by: Dustin Guy Defa
- Produced by: Dustin Guy Defa
- Starring: Kentucker Audley; Eleonore Hendricks
- Cinematography: Mike Gioulakis
- Edited by: Dustin Guy Defa; David Lowery
- Distributed by: Factory 25
- Release date: March 11, 2011 (SXSW)
- Running time: 77 minutes
- Country: United States
- Language: English

Bad Fever is a 2011 American independent drama film directed by Dustin Guy Defa.

== Synopsis ==
A relationship occurs between a wishful stand-up comedian (Kentucker Audley) and a shady drifter (Eleonore Hendricks).

== Cast ==
- Kentucker Audley as Eddie
- Eleonore Hendricks as Irene
- Allison Baar as Yoko
- Hayward Buchanan as Hank
- Scott Parisi as Waiter
- Dane Stevens as Burt
- Annette Wright as Mama
- Dustin Guy Defa as Larry

== Reception ==
On the review aggregator Rotten Tomatoes, the film holds an approval rating of 50%, based on 6 reviews, with an average rating of 3.4/10. Metacritic assigned the film a weighted average score of 43 out of 100, based on 4 critics, indicating "mixed or average reviews".

Richard Brody of The New Yorker praised the direction, saying: "Defa exerts delicate control over his incendiary material and evokes emotional terrors with a sympathetic directness; his raw-toned drama is quietly hectic and brutally poignant."
