= Maxed Out =

- Promotional film poster
- Directed by: James Scurlock
- Written by: James Scurlock
- Produced by: James Scurlock
- Starring: Mark Mumma; Ronald Reagan; Elizabeth Warren; Chris Barrett; Louis C.K. Dave Ramsey
- Cinematography: Jon Aaseng
- Edited by: Alexis Spraic
- Music by: Benoît Charest
- Distributed by: Magnolia Home Entertainment; Netflix; Red Envelope Entertainment; Truly Indie
- Release dates: March 10, 2006 (South by Southwest Film Festival); March 9, 2007 (Limited Theatrical)
- Running time: 87 minutes
- Country: United States
- Language: English

Maxed Out: Hard Times, Easy Credit and the Era of Predatory Lenders (2006) is an independent feature-length documentary film and (2007) book that chronicles abusive practices in the credit card industry.

Written and directed by James Scurlock, the film and book use interviews with creditors, debtors, academics, and others to illustrate its story. The film, premiered at the South by Southwest Film Festival in Austin, Texas, USA, in 2006 where it claimed the Special Jury Prize, went on to several film fests including Seattle, Full Frame Documentary, Maui, New Zealand, Milwaukee International, Woodstock, Bergen, Leeds International, Oxford and IDFA (Amsterdam) film festivals. Henry Rollins selected Maxed Out when invited to host a favorite film within Maryland Film Festival 2007. The film was released in movie theaters in select cities in the United States starting March 9, 2007 through Magnolia Pictures.

The DVD was released nationally on June 7, 2007, in the joint effort of Magnolia Pictures and Red Envelope Entertainment (a division of Netflix). The book Maxed Out is published by Scribner, a division of Simon & Schuster. It was published in March 2007 in hardcover and in December 2007 in paperback.

Scurlock's purpose for the film and book was to raise awareness of how credit and lending issues are affecting society. The main premises of the documentary and book are that banks and other creditors deliberately market to people who are more likely to have problems paying and that the creditors benefit from connections to government, the debt collection industry, and from lawmaker apathy.

The non-profit organization Americans for Fairness in Lending (AFFIL) has organized screenings of Maxed Out around the country as part of its work. AFFIL sustains a formal collaboration with the film.
