= An African Election =

- Directed by: Jarreth Merz; Kevin Merz
- Written by: Jarreth Merz; Erika Tasini; Shari Yantra Marcacci
- Produced by: Jarreth Merz; Franco Agustoni; Brigitte Agustoni; Luisella Realini; Silvana Bezzola Rigolini; Tiziana Soudani
- Cinematography: Topher Osborn; Kevin Merz
- Edited by: Samir Samperisi
- Music by: Patrick Kirst; Ghanaba
- Release date: October 2010
- Running time: 89 minutes
- Countries: United States; Switzerland
- Language: English

An African Election is a documentary film directed by Jarreth Merz and Kevin Merz about Ghana’s 2008 general election. It won awards at the Roma Independent Film Festival, the Atlanta Film Festival, and Visions du Réel, and was screened at festivals including Sundance, Locarno, Solothurn, and Yamagata.

== Synopsis ==
As Ghana prepares for its 2008 general election, the film follows political events in Accra during the election period.

== Production ==
The project began as Jarreth Merz’s return to Ghana, where he had grown up, before developing into a documentary set against the backdrop of the country’s 2008 national election. The filmmakers were also given access to Ghana’s political “strong room”, offering a behind-the-scenes view of the country’s electoral process.

== Reception ==
=== Awards ===
The film won the New Vision Award at the 2011 Roma Independent Film Festival, the Grand Jury Award at the 2011 Atlanta Film Festival, and the Prix du Public de la ville de Nyon at the 2011 Visions du Réel.

=== Critical response ===
The Toronto Star called An African Election "a gripping study of democracy at both its most fragile and its most vital". The Hollywood Reporter wrote that Merz’s access to both presidential candidates and other political insiders gave the film "credibility and immediacy". The Los Angeles Times described the film as a "gripping examination" of Ghana’s 2008 presidential contest, adding that "the film team had a gift for being where the electoral action was".

== Festival screenings ==
The film premiered in October 2010. It was later screened at festivals including the 2011 Locarno Film Festival, 2011 Filmfest Hamburg, 2011 Bergen International Film Festival, 2012 Solothurn Film Festival, and 2017 Yamagata International Documentary Film Festival. It was also screened in the World Cinema Documentary Competition at the 2011 Sundance Film Festival.
