= Make-out with Violence =

Make-Out with Violence
- Official Teaser Poster
- Directed by: The Deagol Brothers
- Written by: The Deagol Brothers; Eric Lehning; Cody DeVos
- Produced by: The Deagol Brothers
- Starring: Eric Lehning; Cody DeVos; Leah High; Shellie Marie Shartzer; Brett Miller; Tia Shearer; Josh Duensing
- Cinematography: James King; Kevin Doyle; Dave Bousquet
- Edited by: The Deagol Brothers; Brad Bartlett
- Music by: Jordan Lehning
- Production company: Limerent Pictures
- Release date: April 12, 2008
- Running time: 105 minutes
- Country: United States
- Language: English

Make-Out with Violence is a 2008 film directed by the Deagol Brothers, their first feature-length film.

== Plot synopsis ==
The film tells the story of twin brothers Patrick and Carol Darling, newly graduated from high school and struggling to come to terms with the mysterious disappearance of their friend, the bright and beautiful Wendy Hearst. When a drive through the countryside surrounding their posh suburban community leads to the discovery of Wendy's mysteriously animated corpse, the boys secretly transport the zombie Wendy to an empty house in hopes of somehow bringing her back to life. As the sweltering summer pushes on, they must maintain the appearance of normalcy for their friends and family as they search for ways to revive the Wendy they once knew, or, failing that, to satisfy their own quests for love amongst the living and the dead.

== Soundtrack ==
Soundtrack cover art

The film features an entirely original score comprising Brian Eno-inspired pop songs, as well as a few more ambient tracks. Written mostly by brothers Jordan and Eric Lehning under the moniker of The Non-Commissioned Officers, the soundtrack also features various Nashville-local artists such as The Glib, Tristen, Leah High, Vicki Mead, The Ostrich Boys, and Amanda Crawford.

The writing of the soundtrack actually began before the writing of the script. In the Spring of 2004, around the same time that work on the actual screenplay began, Jordan and Eric Lehning got together to begin work on the soundtrack to the film. The two met in Boston where Jordan was attending Berklee College of Music, and created a few songs for the movie, with the idea that the musical themes would help sculpt the story of the film itself. Many of the songs created during this time made it onto the final soundtrack when it was released 5 years later, including "No Means No," "Sweet Eleanor," and "Flour."

The 2-disc, 44-song soundtrack was independently released in March 2009, coinciding with the film's showings at the 2009 South by Southwest Film Festival. It can currently only be purchased online through the film's Web site for $15 or in a small amount of independent music stores across the country.

== Release ==
The film premiered at the 2008 Atlanta Film Festival, where it won the Grand Jury Prize for Best Narrative Feature.

=== Festivals ===
The film has played at many festivals around the world, including the following:

- Atlanta Film Festival
- Sidewalk Moving Picture Festival
- Maryland Film Festival
- Indie Memphis Film Festival 2008
- Oxford (Mississippi) Film Festival 2009
- Boulder International Film Festival
- San Francisco Independent Film Festival
- Magnolia Independent Film Festival
- South by Southwest Film Festival
- Salem Film Festival
- Independent Film Festival of Boston
- Nashville Film Festival

== Awards ==
- Atlanta Film Festival 2008 - Grand Jury Prize for Best Narrative Feature
- Indie Memphis Film Festival 2008 - Ron Tibbett Excellence in Filmmaking Award
- Oxford Film Festival 2009 - Jury Award for Best Narrative Feature
- Magnolia Independent Film Festival 2009 - Best Feature Film
- Nashville Film Festival 2009 - Regal Cinemas/Nashville Film Festival Dreammaker Award for Best Narrative Feature
- Nashville Film Festival 2009 - Tennessee Independent Spirit Award
- Nashville Film Festival 2009 - Best Music in a Feature Film
- Fantastique Semaine du Cinema 2010 - "Special Mention"
