= A Certain Kind of Death =

- Directed by: Grover Babcock; Blue Hadaegh
- Release date: 2003
- Running time: 69 minutes
- Country: United States
- Language: English

A Certain Kind of Death is a 2003 American documentary film examining what happens to the bodies of those who die with no next of kin. The film was awarded a Documentary Special Jury Prize at the Sundance Film Festival and a Jury Award for Best Documentary at the Atlanta Film Festival.

== Synopsis ==
In 2001, the Los Angeles County Coroner's Office investigates deaths, including those of people lacking next of kin. Field workers enter residences to perform initial investigation and to remove the bodies, while office workers examine the decedents' personal papers, attempting to contact relatives or friends. The body of Ronald Eugene Tanner is discovered in his apartment. Preceded in death by his immediate family, Tanner lacked next of kin. A gay man, Tanner was also preceded in death by his partner James Fuller, who died of AIDS in 1993. At the time of Fuller's death, Tanner had arranged for Fuller's burial at Hollywood Hills Cemetery, using a plot he owned. Tanner's apartment is decorated with several artworks, including a large, framed California State Flag.

The Coroner's office works other cases. Donald Eugene Wright is found dead in a motel room following a welfare check, and machinist Tommy Ray Albertson is also found dead at his residence. Having used his plot to bury Fuller, Tanner left instructions for his body to be buried at a family plot in Mendocino, California. The cemetery manager determines that the family plot is full, and Tanner's body is buried in a nearby plot. The county's process for managing deaths also involves the decedents' financials. Albertson's tools and Tanner's artworks—including the large California flag—are collected from their apartments and sold at an estate sale; the Coroner's office uses the proceeds of decedents' personal effects to defray the costs of its own work and also to pay for funeral arrangements.

After a few months of investigation, the Coroner's office determines that no further progress can be made with the cases of Wright and Albertson, and both bodies are sent with a group of others to a morgue, and eventually to a crematorium. Workers break the bodies down to bone fragments, including their skulls, which are aglow in the flames of the cremator. The bone fragments are then ground to ash, and the cremains are stored in small metal boxes for a period of a few years, until finally they are buried in a mass grave, unmarked except for a small plaque showing the decedents' shared year of death. The film ends with the burial of people who died in 1997, the final step which will later be taken with the cremains of Wright and Albertson.

== Reception ==
On review aggregator website Rotten Tomatoes, the film holds an approval rating of 100% based on 6 reviews, with an average rating of 7.8/10.
