= Driving with Selvi =

- Directed by: Elisa Paloschi
- Produced by: Elisa Paloschi
- Cinematography: Elisa Paloschi
- Edited by: Dave Kazala; Mahi Rahgozar
- Music by: Ken Myhr
- Production company: Eyesfull
- Release date: 29 October 2015 (Raindance Film Festival)
- Running time: 74 minutes
- Country: Canada
- Languages: English, Kannada

Driving with Selvi is a Canadian documentary film that focuses on South India's first female taxi driver, a young woman named Selvi who had previously escaped a child marriage. The film was directed by Elisa Paloschi, who also acted as producer for the project.

Selvi, like so many girls in India, is a child bride in a violent marriage. One day she escapes, and goes on to become South India's first female taxi driver. This is the ten-year journey of a charming, strong, and courageous young woman who defies all expectations, moving beyond the pain she's experienced to create a new life.

== Background ==
Paloschi met Selvi in 2004 in India when she was tourist in Mysore, India. After Paloschi volunteered with Odanadi, an organization dedicated to rehabilitate people affected by human trafficking, they asked her to shoot a short film for their organization. Paloschi became "enamored" with Selvi, and ended up following her over the next 10 years to film the documentary.

Selvi had been married off a month after her first period for a dowry consisting of a pair of earrings and some household utensils. She was 13 years old. After putting up with years of abuse and torture by her husband—and immediate family members including her mother and brother, the 18-year-old made a break for it and ran to the bus stop. "I waited for a bus because I wanted to throw myself under it, but when the bus came, I raised my hand and got on it instead," she tells the camera. "If I died, I wouldn’t be able to prove myself. That is why I ran away."

Paloschi had also, in a sense, run away, leaving her life as an interactive content producer in Italy to go on a yoga retreat. After volunteering to work at the Odanadi women's refuge she met Selvi, who she says she was drawn to immediately. "She really is powerful and she has no idea of it, unaware of the strength and power she possesses. Even today she says, ‘Why are you filming me? Why is this film about me?’".

Chicken & Egg Pictures had financially backed Paloschi with her project, as had GoodPitch2 India, a subsidiary of the BRITDOC Foundation. Funding for post-production costs had been solicited through Indiegogo, a crowdfunding website.

Following her success at GoodPitch2 India, Elisa was asked to join the delegation of Canada's Governor General David Johnston’s state visit to India in 2014. At this time, India and Canada signed an audio-visual co-production agreement to enable film producers to tap into various incentives and tax breaks offered by both governments. The diplomatic mission of the trip is outlined here.

== Synopsis ==
Selvi, like so many girls living within India’s patriarchal culture, is forced to marry at a young age, only to find herself in a violent and abusive marriage. One day in deep despair, she chooses to escape, going to a highway with the intention of throwing herself under the wheels of a bus. Instead she gets on the bus, choosing to live… and goes on to become South India’s first female taxi driver.

We first meet 18-year-old Selvi at a girls’ shelter in 2004 – timid, soft-spoken, a fresh runaway from a difficult life. Over a ten-year journey, we see a remarkable transformation as Selvi finds her voice and defies all expectations – learning to drive, starting her own taxi company, leading seminars to educate other women, and much more.

This character-driven story highlights the challenges that millions of devalued women and girls in India face. In a society where women are often considered expendable or worthless, Selvi refuses to accept this estimation for herself, moving beyond the pain she's experienced to create an entirely new life.

Through Selvi's eyes, the audience is taken on an intimate journey of healing, overcoming obstacles, and fulfilling dreams. And throughout this journey, Selvi's unwavering spirit shines through. Wildly charming (without even realizing it), remarkably strong, and utterly courageous, by the end of the film Selvi speaks almost as a sage or our wisest teacher, sharing important, hard-won secrets about happiness and life.

== Reception ==
The film had its world premiere at Raindance Film Festival.

Paloschi has stated "I didn’t set out to make films that would send a message, but I gradually realised that I was drawn to people who had a spark in their soul and a powerful impact on those around them."

Indie Wire called DWS an "inspiring story". The Toronto Film Scene echoed that it was inspirational, also writing "Her growth and transformation is an inspiring one as she changes from an eighteen-year-old soft-spoken runaway, to a woman finding her voice and refusing to surrender to the limitations that society attempts to force upon her."

Paloschi was included as a delegate because of her work on DWS for the Canadian-Indian Copro Treaty signing, an international co production treaty for film between the two countries. David Johnston headed the delegation.

== Awards ==
- Top Ten Audience Favourites, IDFA 2015
- Best Documentary - Truth to Power Award, Reel Asian Film Festival 2015
- New Mavericks Award, Atlanta Film Festival 2015
- Best Documentary Jury Prize, Atlanta Film Festival 2015
- Best Director Non Fiction, Yorkton Film Festival 2016
- Best Documentary, Indian Film Festival of Houston 2016
- Donald Brittain Award nominee at the 7th Canadian Screen Awards in 2019

== Grants ==
Bertha Britdoc Connect Fund, 2014 and 2016
Chicken & Egg Pictures
The Fledgling Fund
Women in Film Finishing Fund
Women in Film & Television International
Canada Council for the Arts
Ontario Arts Council
Toronto Arts Council
Private philanthropists and over 600 individual donors through Indiegogo.
