= The Adults (film) =

2023 American comedy drama film

- Poster
- Directed by: Dustin Guy Defa
- Screenplay by: Dustin Guy Defa
- Produced by: Michael Cera; Hannah Dweck; Ted Schaefer; Allison Rose Carter; Jon Read; Julia Thompson
- Starring: Michael Cera; Hannah Gross; Sophia Lillis; Wavyy Jonez
- Cinematography: Tim Curtin
- Edited by: Michael Taylor
- Music by: Alex Weston
- Production companies: Dweck Productions; Savage Rose Films
- Distributed by: Universal Pictures Content Group; Variance Films
- Release dates: February 18, 2023 (Berlinale); August 18, 2023 (United States)
- Running time: 91 minutes
- Country: United States
- Language: English

The Adults is a 2023 American comedy drama film, written and directed by Dustin Guy Defa and starring Michael Cera, Hannah Gross, Sophia Lillis and Wavyy Jonez. The film follows Eric, who has a plan to make a trip back home as short as possible but he finds himself balancing the relationship with his two sisters and his addiction to a local poker game.

It was nominated to compete for the Encounter Award at the 73rd Berlin International Film Festival, where it had its world premiere on February 18, 2023. It was released on August 18, 2023, by Variance Films and Universal Pictures Content Group.

== Synopsis ==
Eric wanted to have a short trip back home, but as time passes, it turns into a nostalgic stay as Eric catches up with his two sisters. His desire to prove himself to be the best poker player in town is also holding up his return. His sour relationship with his sister Rachel, and their little sister Maggie's attempts to revive the camaraderie they once shared, make Eric and Rachel face the reality of the present divide between them.

== Cast ==
- Michael Cera as Eric
- Hannah Gross as Rachel
- Sophia Lillis as Maggie
- Wavyy Jonez as Dennis
- Anoop Desai as Josh
- Kyra Tantao as Megan
- Kiah McKirnan as Amanda
- Simon Kim as Greg
- Lucas Papaelias as Bobby
- Tina Benko as Christina
- Christopher Denham as Scott

== Release ==
The film had its world premiere on February 18, 2023. at the 73rd Berlin International Film Festival. It was invited to Horizons section of 57th Karlovy Vary International Film Festival, where it was screened on 30 June 2023.

It was released on August 18, 2023.

== Reception ==
On the review aggregator website Rotten Tomatoes, 72% of 39 critics' reviews are positive, with an average rating of 6.5/10. The website's consensus reads: "The Adults finds enough profundity in grief and strained sibling bonds to overcome an occasionally aimless story, with subtly rewarding results." Metacritic, which uses a weighted average, assigned the film a score of 73 out of 100, based on 14 critics, indicating "generally favorable" reviews.

Rory O'Connor graded the film B+ for The Film Stage and wrote, "It’s coarse to the touch but The Adults is a tender film." Steph Green reviewing for IndieWire graded the film B and wrote, "A raw, sensitive, and true look at a family in flux with too much love to give and no tools to whittle it into something useful." Guy Lodge reviewing at Berlin Film Festival, for Variety wrote, "From... queasiness comes bristly tension, tautening and deepening what otherwise seems a low-key, low-stakes character study, and eventually a sweet, conciliatory sliver of hope too."

Conversely, Damon Wise reviewing for Deadline Hollywood criticized the film, writing: "The Adults is a comedy-drama that doesn’t seem to deliver much of either, and that gray, in-between state just isn’t appealing anymore. Could it be that the cinema of awkwardness, or mumblecore in different clothes, has finally reached its sell-by date?"

== Accolades ==
| Award | Date of ceremony | Category | Recipient | Result | Ref. |
|---|---|---|---|---|---|
| Berlin International Film Festival | 26 February 2023 | Golden Bear Plaque | The Adults | Nominated | |
