= Glena (film) =

Mixed martial arts documentary

- Directed by: Allan Luebke
- Written by: Allan Luebke; Matt Mastrantuono
- Produced by: Allan Luebke; Josh Leake; Eric Stolberg
- Starring: Glena Avila
- Cinematography: Allan Luebke
- Edited by: Allan Luebke
- Music by: Peter Bosack
- Release date: September 25, 2014 (Showtime)
- Running time: 84 minutes
- Country: United States
- Language: English

Glena is an American documentary film directed by Emmy-winning filmmaker Allan Luebke. The film tells the story of Glena Avila, a single mother who turns to cage fighting to support her family.

== Synopsis ==
Allan Luebke’s GLENA is the story of Glena Avila, a single mother in her 30s who decides to bank her future on a career as a mixed martial arts (MMA) cage fighter. Training night and day for her matches, Glena’s total commitment throws her family into crisis, with her children needing her care and her time at her job conflicting with her rigorous workout schedule. But if she can give her all and continue to win her fights, she has a shot at the big time and a future as a professional athlete. Can Glena triumph?

== Production ==
Filming of Glena began in November 2010 in Oregon. The movie was shot on a low budget. The main camera used was a Canon XH-A1, and a Panasonic DVX-100 was used to shoot some early footage. The one-man-crew relied on a wireless lavaliere microphone and camera-mounted shotgun microphone to capture audio. Available lighting was used almost exclusively, though a camera-mounted LitePanels Micro was utilized at times. Luebke, who also edited the film, utilized extensive post-production techniques including ADR and sound design to create the film's elaborate fight sequences.

Luebke made use of a $5,000 Kickstarter campaign to raise funds. The Kickstarter campaign was originally intended to pay for two months of editing on a short film version, but the project would ultimately be in production for another three years as a feature-length film was developed.

== Release ==
Glena world premiered at the Slamdance Film Festival on January 18, 2014. It was one of only eight documentaries selected from 5,000 films submitted. It has also played at the Sarasota Film Festival, Newport Beach Film Festival, Maryland Film Festival, Brooklyn Film Festival, San Francisco DocFest, Philadelphia Independent Film Festival, Downtown Film Festival Los Angeles, Tacoma Film Festival, Rocky Mountain Women's Film Festival, and more.

The movie received the Audience Award for Best Documentary at the Women + Film VOICES Film Festival in Denver, Colorado, the Special Jury Award for Inspirational Filmmaking at the Arizona International Film Festival in Tucson, Arizona, and the Special Jury Award at Indie Memphis in Memphis, Tennessee. It was selected as the Opening Night Film at the Portland Film Festival.

Its American television premiere was on Showtime on September 25, 2014. It released on VOD on August 11, 2015.

== Critical response ==
Film Colossus said "Glena...is right up there with Hoop Dreams.". Marc Mohan of The Oregonian called the movie an "...astonishing real-life saga of grit, tears and vicious competitive combat." John Ford at SLUG Magazine called it "...rousing and inspirational..."
