= Daytime Drinking =

- Film poster
- Hangul: 낮술
- RR: Natsul
- MR: Nassul
- Directed by: Noh Yeong-seok
- Written by: Noh Yeong-seok
- Produced by: Noh Yeong-seok
- Starring: Song Sam-dong; Yuk Sang-yeop
- Cinematography: Noh Yeong-seok
- Edited by: Noh Yeong-seok
- Music by: Noh Yeong-seok
- Release dates: May 3, 2008 (Jeonju International Film Festival); February 5, 2009 (South Korea)
- Running time: 116 minutes
- Country: South Korea
- Language: Korean
- Box office: US$137,034

Daytime Drinking (Korean: 낮술; RR: Natsul) is a 2008 South Korean film directed by Noh Yeong-seok.

On July 20, 2009, Funimation announced that it had acquired a license to distribute this film in North America.

== Plot ==
On a drunken night out with his friends, a broken-hearted young man is swayed into going to the countryside with them for a getaway. But when he gets there, he finds that not only have none of them showed up, but the tiny seaside town is shuttered - no shops are open, no tourists are around, the beach is freezing, and there's no cell phone signal. Unable (and reluctant) to return to Seoul, he finds himself in the company of some very unusual locals and, subject to the rigid rules of Korean drinking culture, on an increasingly strange odyssey nursing a never-ending hangover.

Ushering in a new era of independent filmmaking in South Korea, Daytime Drinking is a comedy in the spirit of Stranger Than Paradise and Sideways, but with a distinctly Korean twist.

== Cast ==
- Song Sam-dong as Hyeok-jin
- Yuk Sang-yeop as Gi-sang
- Kim Gang-hui as Next-door woman
- Lee Ran-hui as Ran-hui
- Shin Un-seop
- Tak Seong-jun

== Festivals ==
- Jeonju International Film Festival 2008
- Locarno International Film Festival 2008
- Toronto International Film Festival 2008
- Vessoul Asian Film Festival 2009
- Asian Hot Shots Berlin 2009
- International Film Festival Rotterdam 2009
- SXSW Film Festival 2009
- Maryland Film Festival 2009
- Hong Kong International Film Festival 2009
- Wisconsin Film Festival 2009
- Singapore International Film Festival 2009
- Fantasia Festival 2009
- Seattle International Film Festival 2009

== Awards ==
- JJ-Star Award / Audience Critics' Award - Jeonju International Film Festival 2008
- Special Mention of the Jury / NETPAC Award - Locarno International Film Festival 2008
- INALCO Jury Award - Vessoul Asian Film Festival 2009

== International releases ==
The film was picked up for general release in the United Kingdom by Inclusionism Films in 2011. The UK DVD release featured an interview with director Noh Yeong-seok, in which he explained some of the myriad "rules for drinking" in Korean culture. The film was well received by press in the UK, with Time Out London commenting on the "winning combination of pacing and a sharp script." In 2020, the film was ranked by The Guardian number 20 among the classics of modern South Korean cinema.
