= James Scurlock =

American film director

- Born: James Duncan Scurlock; September 15, 1971 (age 54); Seattle, Washington
- Occupations: Director, producer, financial writer
- Years active: 2004–present

James Duncan Scurlock (born September 15, 1971) is an American director, producer, writer and financial adviser. He is probably best known for his documentary Maxed Out: Hard Times, Easy Credit and the Era of Predatory Lenders and his book, Maxed Out: Hard Times in the Age of Easy Credit. His most recent book, King Larry: The Life and Ruins of a Billionaire Genius, is a biography of Larry Hillblom.

== Biography ==
Born in Seattle, Washington, he attended the Wharton School, University of Pennsylvania, studying finance, but left in his senior year without receiving a degree. While in college, he opened four restaurants, which he sold in 1994. He then moved to Dallas, where he published a successful investing newsletter titled Restaurant Investor and wrote freelance for several magazines.

In 2002, Scurlock moved to Los Angeles, to pursue a career in filmmaking. His first documentary, Parents of the Year (2004), was featured in over 25 film festivals and won numerous awards, including the Audience Award at the Los Angeles Film Festival and the Jury Awards at the Austin Film Festival, the USA Film Festival and the Palm Springs Short Film Festival. Parents of the Year was bought by HBO and broadcast extensively on HBO Latino. Scurlock's second short, Stumped! (2005), follows three eccentric citizens who run against Arnold Schwarzenegger for Governor of California. His first feature length documentary was the critically acclaimed Maxed Out: Hard Times, Easy Credit and the Era of Predatory Lenders (2006), which he also produced.

Scurlock also wrote a major book based on Maxed Out. In conjunction with the global release of the film, his book, Maxed Out: Hard Times in the Age of Easy Credit (2006), was published through Scribner, a division of Simon & Schuster.

In 2008, Scurlock received The Ridenhour Book Prize for Maxed Out: Hard Times in the Age of Easy Credit.

In early 2012, Scurlock released King Larry: The Life and Ruins of a Billionaire Genius, a biography of the DHL co-founder, Larry Hillblom.

== Personal life ==
James Scurlock lives in Palm Springs, California.

== Publishing history ==
=== Film ===
- Maxed Out: Hard Times, Easy Credit and the Era of Predatory Lenders

=== Books ===
- Maxed Out: Hard Times in the Age of Easy Credit ISBN 1-416-53253-6
- King Larry: The Life and Ruins of a Billionaire Genius
