= Dustin Guy Defa =

American filmmaker

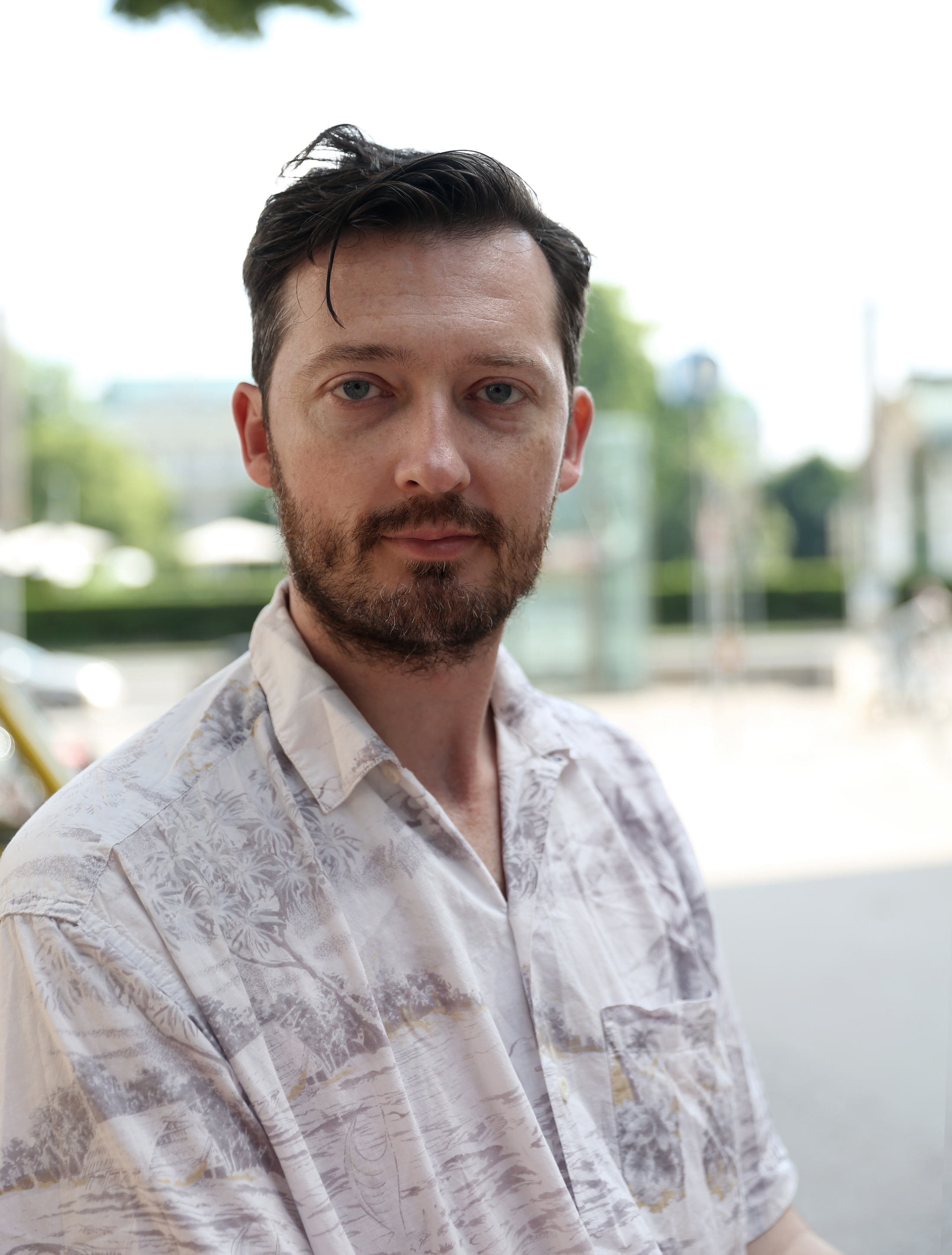
- Born: Salt Lake City, Utah, U.S.
- Occupation(s): Director, Screenwriter, Actor
- Years active: 2008–present

Dustin Guy Defa is an American independent filmmaker and actor. He is best known for directing the feature films Bad Fever and Person to Person and writing the screenplay for The Mountain.

== Early life ==
Dustin Guy Defa was born in Salt Lake City, Utah in 1978.

== Career ==
Defa wrote and directed his first feature film Bad Fever in 2011. It starred Kentucker Audley and Eleonore Hendricks and focused on the story of a socially inept wannabe stand-up comic who becomes infatuated with a drifter he meets outside of a gas station. The film premiered at South by Southwest to positive reviews, commending the film's pared-down naturalism and the direction of the actors.

The New Yorker's Richard Brody praised the film, saying "Defa exerts delicate control over his incendiary material and evokes emotional terrors with a sympathetic directness; his raw-toned drama is quietly hectic and brutally poignant."

Defa then made two short films, Person to Person and Family Nightmare which both premiered at the Sundance Film Festival

In 2015, the Film Society of Lincoln Center programmed a retrospective of his short work.

Defa wrote a screenplay for a feature-length version of Person to Person. The film follows a series of characters living in New York City as they navigate a myriad of complex human relationships. He cast actors including Abbi Jacobson, Michael Cera, Tavi Gevinson, Philip Baker Hall and director Benny Safdie to fill in the ensemble cast. The film premiered in the NEXT Section at the 2017 Sundance Film Festival and later had a full theatrical run.

In 2018, Defa co-wrote the subversive 1950's period film The Mountain with director Rick Alverson and Colm O'Leary.

In 2023, he directed a film The Adults, which was screened in Encounter at the 73rd Berlin International Film Festival, for its world premiere on 18 February 2023.

== Acting ==
Defa acted in the feature films Computer Chess, Summer of Blood, Swim Little Fish Swim, and the TV show Easy.

He did the voiceover for the short film Family Tree.

Starting in 2015, Defa began to portray the character of Aziz on The Show About the Show.

== Filmography ==
- 2011 - Family Nightmare; short film
- 2012 - Bad Fever
- 2013 - The Sixth Year; segment director
- 2013 - Declaration of War; short film
- 2013 - Lydia Hoffman Lydia Hofman; short film
- 2014 - Person to Person; short film
- 2015 - Review; short film
- 2015 - God Is an Artist; short film
- 2016 - Dramatic Relationships; short film
- 2017 - Person to Person
- 2021 - Editing; short film
- 2023 - The Adults (director)
