= I Used to Be Darker =

- Theatrical release poster
- Directed by: Matthew Porterfield
- Written by: Amy Belk; Matthew Porterfield
- Produced by: Eric Bannat; Steve Holmgren; Ryan Zacarias
- Starring: Deragh Campbell; Hannah Gross; Ned Oldham; Kim Taylor
- Cinematography: Jeremy Saulnier
- Edited by: Marc Vives
- Music by: Linda Cohen
- Production companies: The Hamilton Film Group; Steady Orbits; Nomadic Independence Pictures
- Distributed by: Strand Releasing
- Release date: January 19, 2013 (Sundance Film Festival)
- Running time: 90 minutes
- Country: United States
- Language: English
- Budget: $42,394
- Box office: $22,214

I Used to Be Darker is a 2013 independent drama film set and shot in Maryland, the third feature film directed by Matthew Porterfield.

== Plot ==
Fleeing from Northern Ireland after realizing she is pregnant, 19-year-old Taryn finds refuge with her aunt Kim in Baltimore. She is parting ways with her partner, Bill, under the reproachful gaze of their daughter Abby.

== Cast ==
- Deragh Campbell as Taryn
- Hannah Gross as Abby
- Ned Oldham as Bill
- Kim Taylor as Kim
- Nicholas Petr as Nick
- Geoff Grace as Geoff
- John Belanger as Ben
- Jack Carneal as Jack
- Juan Eloy Carrera as Arcade Player
- Adèle Exarchopoulos as Camille
- Blake Pruitt as High Schooler
- Declan Sammon as Sam
- Ellis Woodward as Tom
- Jimi Zhivago as Jimi

== Development ==
=== Production ===
In July 2011, Matthew Porterfield started raising money to fund the production of I Used to Be Darker via Kickstarter. The project achieved its goal of $40,000 on August 13, 2011.

=== Cast ===
Porterfield had already known Ned Oldham for several years before casting him as Bill, and Amy Belk went to college with Kim Taylor in the 1990s. After meeting Taylor and seeing her perform, Porterfield "knew almost immediately she had what [he] was looking for". Porterfield first met Hannah Gross and Deragh Campbell when they attended the premiere of his previous film, Putty Hill (2010), but did not keep in touch with them. He later auditioned Gross, following advice from a friend who is a professor at New York University, where Gross studied in the Experimental Theater Wing. Through Gross, Porterfield later met Campbell and cast them both in the film.

== Reception ==
=== Critical response ===
On Rotten Tomatoes the film has an approval rating of 81% based on 21 reviews, with an average rating of 7.34 out of 10. On Metacritic, the film received a weighted average score of 69 out of 100, based on 10 reviews, which indicates "generally favorable" reviews.

A.A. Dowd of The A.V. Club gave the film a grade A−, and wrote: "Drenched in the evening glow of its urban and suburban backdrops, Darker comes alive in the dark, when its characters are drowning their sorrows in song, the sauce, or conversation." Sheri Linden of the Los Angeles Times wrote: "It's a story of contained chaos, quietly observed — one that catches fire more in retrospect than in the viewing." Albert Nowicki of Movies Room ranked it among the fifteen best overlooked 21st century indie films.

=== Accolades ===
I Used to Be Darker won the award for Best Narrative Feature at the Berlin International Film Festival in 2013 and Matthew Porterfield also won the award for Best Director at the Buenos Aires International Festival of Independent Cinema.
