= Daniel Conrad =

American painter

Daniel Conrad (born 1946) is an American light-artist, painter, sound artist, teacher and writer from Baltimore County, Maryland.

== Light Art ==
Conrad began his light-work in the late 1960s in response to his reading of Josef Albers’ Interaction of Color while at Amherst College. His experimental film Circles (16mm, 1969) explored color afterimage. While in the San Francisco Bay Area in the early 1970s, he created a colored light performance instrument, derived from concepts of color perception, very different from the psychedelic light shows of that period. This color machine used multiple bulbs with color gels in housings that Conrad fabricated arranged behind a rear-projection screen and controlled by dimmers. Conrad performed in the Bay Area as a "visual musician" with musician Jordan de la Sierra and played in poet Daniel Moore's Floating Lotus Magic Opera Company. Later in the 70s, having returned to Baltimore County, Maryland, Conrad studied at the Maryland Institute College of Art, where he earned an MFA from The Hoffberger School of Painting under Grace Hartigan in 1981.

The term “chromaccord”, meaning “colors-together”, was coined by Conrad in 1999 when he built a refined version of his color machine. Conrad wrote that the chromaccord is "an instrument designed to manipulate kinetic color designed to invoke visual responses. It places an area of color (the object) on a background of another color (the surround). The instrument is performed by changing the color areas. [...] By using such an arrangement, the chromaccord becomes a tool for exploring the visual experience of continually changing sequential and simultaneous contrasts." As a performer of the chromaccord, he has often collaborated with musicians and sound artists, including Ian Nagoski, John Berndt, Neil Feather, Jorge Martins, and Andrew Hayleck. Significant exhibitions of the color-instrument have included performances at the High Zero Festival and the Diapason Gallery. Efforts to apply the principles of the chromaccord to midi-controlled digital projection culminated in the spring of 2009 with a performance at the Baltimore Museum of Art with sound artist Andrew Hayleck.

Since 1998 Conrad has made self-operating color-changing “light paintings” that capture some of the qualities of the chromaccord instrument using various types of internal control circuitry.

== Music ==
Conrad is also an inventor and player of original musical instruments including a vibrating metal device, Wild Wave, and a floating-bridge monochord, Veena Bambeena. He is also vocalist and songwriter in the duo Yoinsh with guitarist Jorge Martins, who self-released a compact disc in 2012, and was a member of The Lum & Abner of Morocco who contributed a track to the 2-CD set More Self is Less Self on the Ecstatic Peace label.

== Family ==
His father Arthur Conrad, a portrait painter whose work hangs in the U.S. Senate reception room, worked with Everett Warner during World War II in designing camouflage for the US Navy. His brother Tony Conrad was a video artist, filmmaker and musician.

== References and further reading ==
- Conrad, Daniel ""The Dichrommacord,"" Leonardo Journal Vol. 32, No. 5, 1999
- Gardner, Lee ""Pigments of His Imagination."" Baltimore City Paper, July 4, 2001
- Gardner, Lee ""Brain Man,"" Baltimore City Paper, Sept. 3, 2008
