= North Central Historic District (Baltimore, Maryland) =

Historic district in Maryland, United States

- U.S. National Register of Historic Places
- U.S. Historic district
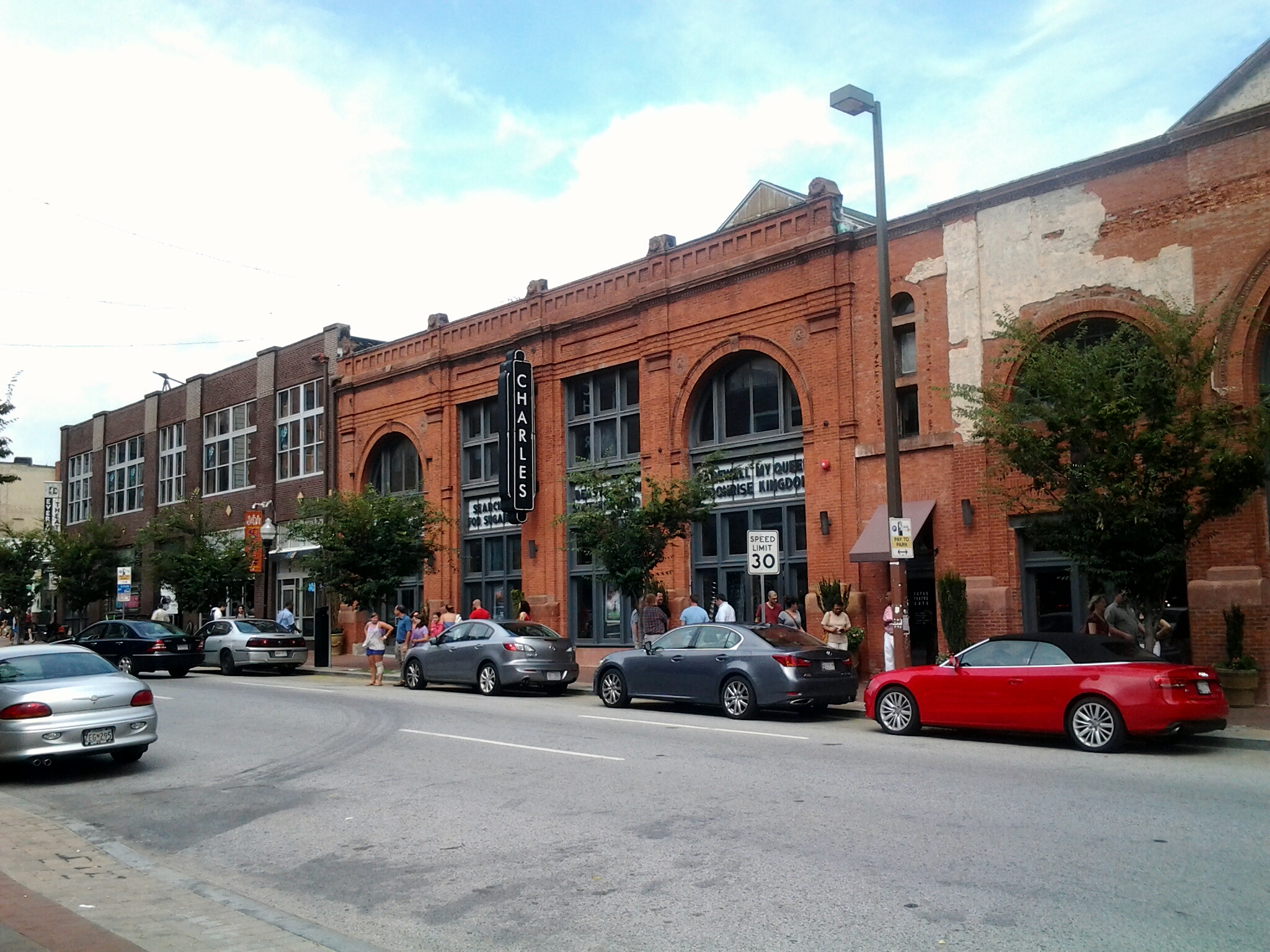

- Location within Baltimore Location within Maryland Location within the United States
- Location: Roughly bounded by North Ave., Greenmount Ave., Falls Rd., and I-83, Baltimore, Maryland
- Coordinates: 39°18′34″N 76°36′48″W
- Area: 38.5 acres (15.6 ha)
- Architect: Smith and May; multiple
- Architectural style: Greek Revival, Classical Revival, et al.
- NRHP reference No.: 02001606
- Added to NRHP: December 27, 2002

North Central Historic District is a national historic district in Baltimore, Maryland, United States. It encompasses an area of approximately 25 city blocks situated directly north of downtown Baltimore and includes 630 buildings. The district, which has a roughly triangular-shape, consists of late-19th-century row housing, commercial storefronts from the early 20th century through the 1950s, large industrial buildings, several older theaters, a church, and two school buildings. A broad variety of row house sizes and types reflects the diversity of the neighborhood's residents, ranging from the large and architecturally elaborate dwellings of the upper class to the small alley houses of working-class African Americans.

It was added to the National Register of Historic Places in 2002.
