= Putty Hill =

2010 film by Matt Porterfield

- Theatrical release poster
- Directed by: Matt Porterfield
- Written by: Matt Porterfield; Jordan Mintzer
- Produced by: Jordan Mintzer; Steve Holmgren; Joyce Kim; Eric Bannat
- Starring: Sky Ferreira; Zoe Vance; James Siebor; Dustin Ray; Cody Ray; Cathy Evans; Ed Sauers; Virginia Heath
- Cinematography: Jeremy Saulnier
- Edited by: Marc Vives
- Production company: The Hamilton Film Group
- Distributed by: The Cinema Guild
- Release dates: February 18, 2010 (Berlin); February 18, 2011 (United States)
- Running time: 85 minutes
- Country: United States
- Language: English
- Budget: $80,000
- Box office: $49,918

Putty Hill is a 2010 American independent drama film co-written and directed by Matt Porterfield, and starring Sky Ferreira, Zoe Vance, and James Siebor. The plot focuses on friends and family who gather to remember a young man in the aftermath of his death and attempt to reconstruct his last days.

== Plot ==
The film revolves around a community of friends and family as they cope with the untimely death of a young man named Cory in Baltimore, Maryland. Throughout the film the characters engage one on one with the camera discussing their relationship to Cory and their reactions to his death.

== Cast ==
- Sky Ferreira as Jenny, Cory's cousin; Spike's daughter
- Zoe Vance as Zoe, Cory's older sister
- James Siebor as James, Cory's brother
- Dustin Ray as Dustin, Cory's best friend
- Charles Sauers as Spike, Cory's uncle; Jenny's father; Cathy's brother
- Cathy Evans as Cathy, mother of Cory, Zoe, James and Marina; Spike's sister
- Virginia Heath as Virginia, Cathy and Spike's mother
- Cody Ray as Cody, Dustin's brother
- Casey Weibust as Casey, Zoe's best friend
- Drew Harris as Geoff, Cory's neighbor, Ashley's brother
- Marina Siebor as Marina, Cory's younger sister
- Jimee Buchanon as Jimee, Cory's friend; Ashley's neighbor; Mary's boyfriend
- Mary Pozoulakis as Mary, Cory's friend; Jimee's girlfriend
- Aurora Corey as Aurora, Jenny's childhood best friend
- Liz O'Brien as Liz, Aurora's Friend
- Ashley Ocfemia as Ashley, Aurora's Friend; Geoff's sister
- Ian Burke as Ian, Cody's friend
- Joseph Mooney as Joe, a friend of the family
- Carol Ray as Carol, Cody and Dustin's mother
- India Streeter as India, Cody's girlfriend
- Alex Herbskerman as Alex, Zoe's friend
- Lucie Stahl as Lucie, Zoe's friend
- Julia Arredondo as Julia, Zoe's friend

== Filming ==
Filming took place in and around Baltimore, Maryland. The film is noted for utilizing mainly nonprofessional actors who play themselves in a fictional story. Much of the dialogue was created through conversations Matthew Porterfield had with the actors prior to filming. The director names mainly European directors as influences, such as Pedro Costa and Robert Bresson.

== Reception ==
Putty Hill was premiered at the 60th Berlin International Film Festival. Roger Ebert reviewed the film giving it 4 out of 4 stars. The film was designated a New York Times Critic's Pick as well. The film had its Baltimore premiere within Maryland Film Festival to two sold-out screenings in May, 2010. It was acquired for U.S. distribution by The Cinema Guild.

On the review aggregator website Rotten Tomatoes, Putty Hill holds an approval rating of 74% based on 34 reviews, with an average rating of 6.9/10.
