= Lee Eddy =

American stage actor, comedian, and writer

- Born: 1978 (age 47–48); Shreveport, Louisiana, United States of America
- Years active: 1999-present
- Known for: Rooster Teeth; Camp Camp; Mo; Apollo 10 1/2: A Space Age Childhood
- Spouse: Macon Blair
- Children: 2

Lee Eddy (born 1978) is an American stage actress, comedian and writer best known for her work on Mo and Apollo 10 1/2: A Space Age Childhood.

== Early life and career ==
Eddy was born in Shreveport, Louisiana where, as a child, she was a member of The Peter Pan Players, a children's theater group. She continued her theatrical pursuits and had a long-running comedy and live theater career in Austin, Texas. Eddy has been voted "Best Actress in Austin" in The Austin Chronicle's Reader poll for 2004, 2005 and 2006.

Eddy lived in Brooklyn, NY for a time and was a house team member at Peoples Improv Theater and a company member of the acclaimed Story Pirates.

Her early voice over career consisted of working with Rooster Teeth, voicing the character of Four Seven Niner in Red vs. Blue, Gwen in their animated series, Camp Camp, and playing Lex in their live-action drama Day 5.

Eddy has recurring roles on many television series, including Netflix/A24 Mo, season 1 of Cruel Summer, and young adult thriller Panic. Eddy has recently appeared in Richard Linklater's Apollo 10 1/2: A Space Age Childhood, Macon Blair's I Don't Feel at Home in This World Anymore, and Martin Scorsese's Killers of the Flower Moon.

== Personal life ==
She is married to actor, screenwriter, and director Macon Blair.

== Filmography ==
=== Film ===
| Year | Title | Role | Notes |
|---|---|---|---|
| 2002 | Dance Club | Bakery Manager | Short film |
| 2006 | Gretchen | Wolf | |
| 2007 | Flatland: The Movie | Helios (voice) | Short film |
| 2012 | The Man from Orlando | Virginia | |
| 2013 | Blue Ruin | Newscaster | |
| 2015 | Lazer Team | Radio Dispatcher | |
| 2017 | Mustang Island | Lee | |
| 2017 | I Don't Feel at Home in This World Anymore | Angie | |
| 2019 | Mercy Black | Lily Bellows | |
| 2019 | Kindred Spirits | Detective Wolf | |
| 2020 | Why Haven't They Fixed the Cameras Yet? | The Woman | Short film |
| 2020 | We Can Be Heroes | Administrator | |
| 2022 | Apollo 10 1/2: A Space Age Childhood | Mom | |
| 2023 | Killers of the Flower Moon | Mrs. Mackie | |
| 2024 | You're Invited to Tuscan's 5th Birthday Party! | Tabitha | Short film Also writer and director |

=== Television ===
| Year | Title | Role | Notes |
|---|---|---|---|
| 1999 | Dai-Guard | Arisa (voice) | |
| 2000 | Sakura Wars | Kanna Kirishima (voice) | |
| 2002 | Happy Lesson | Satsuki (voice) | |
| 2021 | Panic | Sgt. Christine Langley | Recurring role, 10 episodes |
| 2021 | Cruel Summer | Dr. Sylvia Parks | Recurring role |
| 2022–present | Mo | Lizzie Horowitz | Recurring role |

=== Web ===
| Year | Title | Role | Notes |
|---|---|---|---|
| 2008-2019 | Red vs. Blue | 479er, Chrovos (voices) | |
| 2016–2019 | Camp Camp | Gwen (voice) | Season 1-4 |
| 2016-2017 | Day 5 | Lex | |
| 2018 | Nomad of Nowhere | Bandit Leader (voice) | 1 episode |
| 2021 | Panic | Sgt. Christine Langley | |
