= You Hurt My Feelings =

You Hurt My Feelings may refer to:

- You Hurt My Feelings (2011 film), an American comedy-drama film
- You Hurt My Feelings (2023 film), an American comedy film starring Julia Louis-Dreyfus
