= Green Room (film) =

2015 film by Jeremy Saulnier

- Theatrical release poster
- Directed by: Jeremy Saulnier
- Written by: Jeremy Saulnier
- Produced by: Neil Kopp; Victor Moyers; Anish Savjani; Macon Blair
- Starring: Anton Yelchin; Imogen Poots; Alia Shawkat; Joe Cole; Callum Turner; Patrick Stewart
- Cinematography: Sean Porter
- Edited by: Julia Bloch
- Music by: Brooke Blair; Will Blair
- Production companies: Broad Green Pictures; FilmScience
- Distributed by: A24
- Release dates: May 17, 2015 (Cannes); April 15, 2016 (United States)
- Running time: 95 minutes
- Country: United States
- Language: English
- Budget: $5 million
- Box office: $3.8 million

Green Room is a 2015 American thriller film written and directed by Jeremy Saulnier, and produced by Neil Kopp, Victor Moyers and Anish Savjani. Starring Anton Yelchin, Imogen Poots, Alia Shawkat, Joe Cole, Callum Turner and Patrick Stewart, the film focuses on a punk band who find themselves attacked by neo-Nazi skinheads after witnessing a murder at a remote club in the Pacific Northwest.

Principal photography took place during October 2014 in Portland, Oregon. The film was financed and produced by Broad Green Pictures. Green Room was screened in the Directors' Fortnight section at the 2015 Cannes Film Festival. At the 2015 Toronto International Film Festival, the film finished third in the balloting for the Grolsch People's Choice Midnight Madness Award. The film began a limited release on April 15, 2016, before being widely released on May 13 through A24. It appeared on many critics' lists as one of the best films of 2016 and received a 2017 Empire Award nomination for Best Horror, and grossed $3.8 million against a budget of $5 million. This was Anton Yelchin's final film released during his lifetime.

== Plot summary ==
Pat, Sam, Reece and Tiger are members of a punk band, the Ain't Rights, traveling through the Pacific Northwest. After their gig is cancelled, a local radio host, Tad, arranges a show through his cousin, Daniel, at a neo-Nazi skinhead bar in the woods outside Portland, opening for the Nazi metal band Cowcatcher.

After the show, Pat returns to the green room to retrieve Sam's phone. He sees the body of a woman, Emily, who has been stabbed to death by Werm, a member of Cowcatcher. Pat calls the police, but the bar employees Gabe and Big Justin confiscate the band's phones and hold them captive in the green room with Emily's friend Amber. Outside, Gabe pays a skinhead to superficially stab another to create a cover story for the police when they respond to the call. Gabe consults with the bar owner and skinhead leader, Darcy, who decides to gift Cowcatcher with poisoned drugs to kill the band, eliminating witnesses.

The band overpowers Big Justin and holds him hostage, taking his pistol and a box cutter from his pocket. They negotiate through the door with Darcy, who asks them to surrender the pistol. Pat agrees, but as he opens the door, Amber sees that it is a trap. Darcy's men slash at Pat's arm until he drops the gun, partially severing his hand before his friends can secure the door. Big Justin attacks the band and Reece unsuccessfully tries to choke him into unconsciousness; Amber instead kills him with the box cutter.

The band discovers an underground lab in the basement, but its only exit is apparently locked from the outside. Arming themselves with improvised weapons, they exit the green room into the empty club. A skinhead, Clark, unleashes an attack dog, which kills Tiger. Amber and Pat drive the dog away with microphone feedback. Reece flees through a window, but is killed by a skinhead.

Pat, Amber, and Sam retreat to the green room. Darcy sends Daniel into the club to kill the band, who Darcy claims murdered Emily. Amber tells Daniel that Werm murdered Emily after discovering Daniel and Emily planned to leave the skinheads. Daniel agrees to help them escape and leads the band into the club, where he is shot dead by the bartender. The group kills the bartender and takes his shotgun, but Clark's dog kills Sam. Darcy's men wound Amber, who retreats to the green room with Pat.

Darcy sends skinheads Jonathan and Kyle with Gabe to kill Pat and Amber, who form a plan. Pat lures Jonathan into the drug lab while Kyle remains in the green room, where Amber sneaks up and kills him with the box cutter. She then outsmarts Jonathan and shoots him with Kyle's gun. Gabe agrees to help Pat and Amber and heads to a farm to call the police.

Pat and Amber find Darcy arranging the band's van to make it appear that they were trespassing and started the violence. Pat and Amber kill Darcy's last men, including Clark, before finally outgunning Darcy himself. Pat and Amber sit and wait for the police.

== Cast ==
- Anton Yelchin as Pat, the bassist of the Ain't Rights
- Imogen Poots as Amber, Emily's friend
- Alia Shawkat as Sam, the guitarist of the Ain't Rights
- Joe Cole as Reece, the drummer of the Ain't Rights
- Callum Turner as Tiger, the singer of the Ain't Rights
- Patrick Stewart as Darcy Banker, the leader of the skinheads
- Mark Webber as Daniel, a skinhead and Tad's cousin in a relationship with Emily
- Eric Edelstein as Big Justin, a skinhead bouncer
- Macon Blair as Gabe, a skinhead and club employee
- Kai Lennox as Clark, a skinhead and dogfight breeder
- David W. Thompson as Tad, a radio host and promoter
- Brent Werzner as Werm, a member of Cowcatcher
- Taylor Tunes as Emily, a skinhead and Amber's friend
- Samuel Summer as Jonathan, a skinhead
- Mason Knight as Kyle, a skinhead
- Colton Ruscheinsky as Alan, a skinhead
- Jacob Kasch as the bartender
- Thomas Bell as man with cell phone

== Production ==
The film came from Saulnier's desire to create a thriller set in a green room, calling the idea "an obsession". Saulnier created a short film set in one as part of a 48-hour film challenge in 2007 which involved the supernatural and according to Saulnier was "Really kind of fun and hammy." However, he still wanted a chance to do his green room movie "the right way". Although the film features a large amount of violence and what Saulnier calls "full frontal gore", he has gone on record as stating that it is not "sadistic", and that every act of violence apart from the initiating incident is done with a reason. As such Saulnier made sure that there were no "gratuitous close ups" of recently deceased characters.

On May 22, 2014, it was announced that Broad Green Pictures would finance and produce the film directed and written by Jeremy Saulnier, with Film Science. Anish Savjani, Neil Kopp and Victor Moyers would produce the film. On October 16, Anton Yelchin and Imogen Poots joined the lead cast of the film, along with Alia Shawkat, Callum Turner, Joe Cole, Macon Blair and Mark Webber. Saulnier revealed at its 10th anniversary screening after Patrick Stewart's death on October 28, 2026, that the production was almost shut down since nobody was cast as Darcy Banker, the leader of a violent white supremacist group. However, on October 21, Stewart was added to the cast to play Banker, resulting in the film being greenlit. Other cast includes Kai Lennox, Eric Edelstein and Taylor Tunes.

=== Filming ===
Principal photography began in October 2014 in Portland, Oregon. The location for Tad's house was in Astoria, Oregon, on the Oregon coast, and the forest scenes were filmed in the Mount Hood National Forest. Filming concluded in late November 2014.

=== Music ===
Saulnier, who used to play in a hardcore punk band called No Turn on Fred, wanted the film to "stand the test of real musicians scrutinizing every frame". He enlisted Hutch Harris of American indie rock band The Thermals to teach the actors the musical parts that they would be performing onscreen. The film's soundtrack is largely populated by heavy metal artists like Midnight rather than white nationalist bands. Saulnier says that he wanted the club to have more of a Motörhead-like atmosphere, and that he had no intention of financially supporting white nationalist artists.

In addition to the songs appearing on the soundtrack, Green Room features several other punk and metal tracks, including Fear's "Legalize Drugs" (1995), Napalm Death's "Suffer the Children" (1990), Obituary's "Paralyzed with Fear" (2014), Poison Idea's "Taken By Surprise" (1990), Slayer's "War Ensemble" (1990), and Bad Brains' "Right Brigade" (1982).

Green Room (Original Soundtrack Album)

Soundtrack album by various artists
- Released: April 15, 2016
- Genre: Punk rock
- Length: 59:47
- Label: Milan Records

Green Room (Original Soundtrack Album)
No.	Title	Writer(s)	Artist(s)	Length
1.	"Weapons Ready"	Brooke Blair; Will Blair	Brooke Blair and Will Blair	2:17
2.	"What Have I Become?"	Benjamin Macensky; Ezra Mihalcin; Matt Mihalcin	The Ain't Rights	2:19
3.	"Corpus Rottus"	Corpus Rottus	Corpus Rottus	3:02
4.	"Oregon Coast"	Brooke Blair; Will Blair	Brooke Blair and Will Blair	0:50
5.	"Balefire"	Brooke Blair; Will Blair	Brooke Blair and Will Blair	0:51
6.	"Prowling Leather"	Jamie Walters	Midnight	3:38
7.	"Nazi Punks Fuck Off"	Darren Henley; Eric Boucher; Geoffrey Lyall; Raymond Pepperell	The Ain't Rights	1:07
8.	"Red Laces"	Brooke Blair; Will Blair	Brooke Blair and Will Blair	2:00
9.	"Pour A Floor"	Brooke Blair; Will Blair	Brooke Blair and Will Blair	2:38
10.	"Blades And Fangs"	Brooke Blair; Will Blair	Brooke Blair and Will Blair	3:15
11.	"Coronary"	Sam Jones	The Ain't Rights	3:03
12.	"Inevitable Failure"	Hochstedder	Hochstedder	3:13
13.	"Mosh Pit"	Brooke Blair; Will Blair	Brooke Blair and Will Blair	0:55
14.	"Mopping Up"	Brooke Blair; Will Blair	Brooke Blair and Will Blair	2:18
15.	"Let's Pretend"	Brooke Blair; Will Blair	Brooke Blair and Will Blair	3:10
16.	"Savage Pressure"	Battletorn	Battletorn	1:04
17.	"Takin' Out The Trash"	Christian Blunda; Patsy Gelb	Patsy's Rats	3:17
18.	"Melted"	Christian Blunda; Patsy Gelb	Patsy's Rats	2:44
19.	"Odin Himself"	Brooke Blair; Will Blair	Brooke Blair and Will Blair	6:10
20.	"Fresh Air"	Brooke Blair; Will Blair	Brooke Blair and Will Blair	1:38
21.	"The Residence"	Brooke Blair; Will Blair	Brooke Blair and Will Blair	3:10
22.	"We Need The Police"	Brooke Blair; Will Blair	Brooke Blair and Will Blair	1:46
23.	"Sinister Purpose"	John Cameron Fogerty	Creedence Clearwater Revival	3:20
24.	"Toxic Evolution"	Sam Jones	The Ain't Rights	2:02
Total length:				59:47

== Release ==
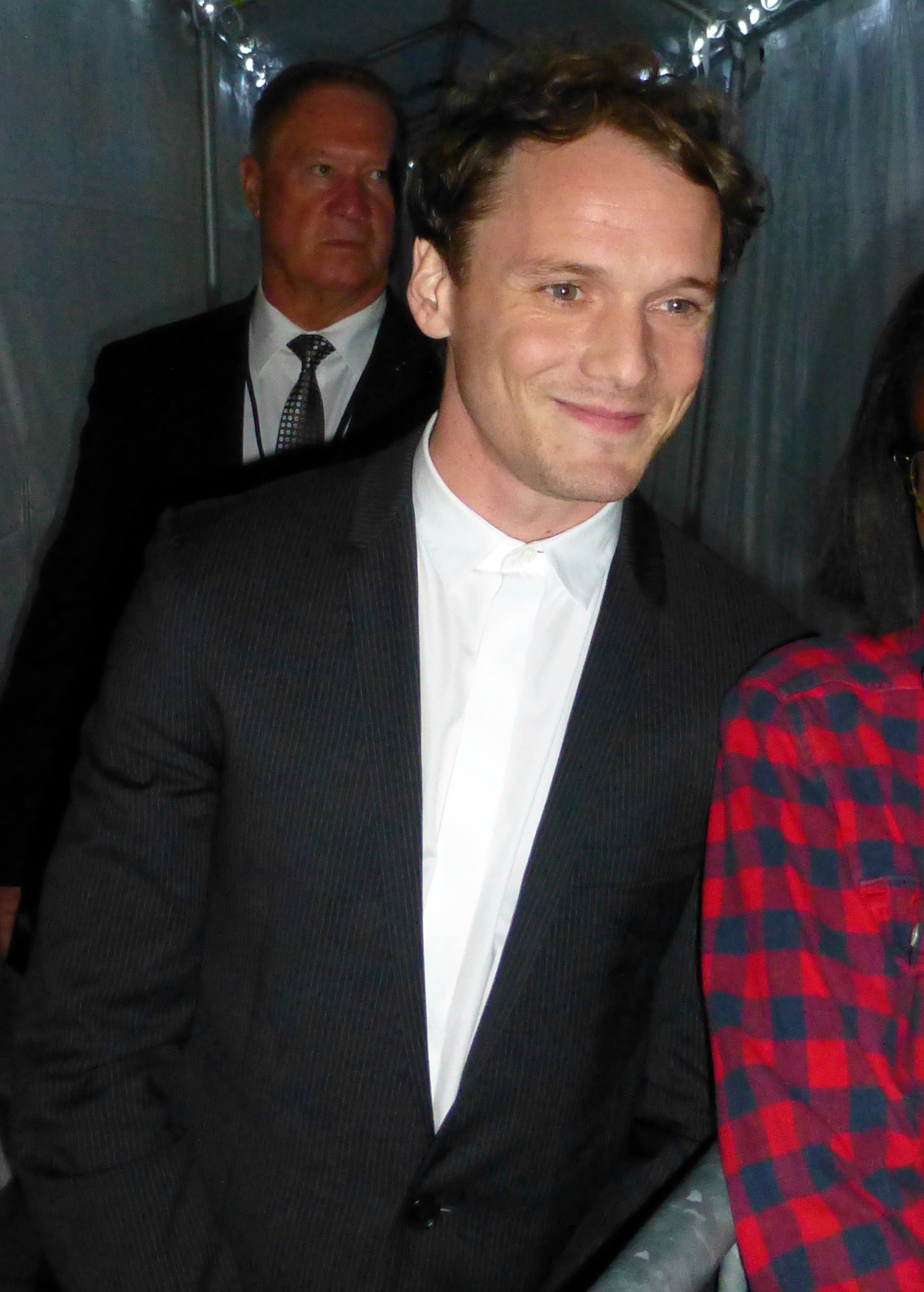
Actor Anton Yelchin at the 2015 Toronto International Film Festival premiere of Green Room. It was his last feature film released while he was alive.

On October 29, 2014, WestEnd Films acquired the international rights to the film. The film had its world premiere at the Cannes Film Festival on May 17, 2015. Shortly after, it was announced A24 had acquired distribution rights to the film. The film screened on opening night of the 2015 Toronto International Film Festival, on September 10, 2015.

The film was originally to open in a limited release on April 1, 2016, before opening in a wide release on April 15, 2016. However, it was moved to April 15, in limited release, and May 13 wide.

=== Home media ===
Lionsgate, as the home media distributor of A24 releases, released Green Room on Blu-ray and DVD on July 12, 2016. The end credits of the film's home media and subsequent releases feature an addended dedication to the memory of star Yelchin, who died on June 19, 2016.

== Reception ==
=== Box office ===
Green Room opened at #30 in its limited release, premiering in 3 theaters, earning $87,984. In its official wide release, the film premiered at 777 theaters, taking the #16 rank on opening weekend, and grossing $547,031 in North America. It grossed a total of $3.8 million worldwide.

=== Critical response ===
On review aggregator website Rotten Tomatoes the film holds an approval rating of 90% based on 250 reviews, with an average rating of 7.7/10. The site's critical consensus reads: "Green Room delivers unapologetic genre thrills with uncommon intelligence and powerfully acted élan." Metacritic gave it a weighted average score of 79 out of 100, based on 42 critics, indicating "generally favorable" reviews.

Richard Roeper of the Chicago Sun-Times praised Patrick Stewart, Imogen Poots, Alia Shawkat and Macon Blair's performances and called the film "a wonderfully nasty, gruesome, jagged-edge gem of a horror film" that has "first-rate" cinematography, set design, soundtrack, and editing. Barry Hertz of The Globe and Mail awarded it a full four stars and wrote, "Jeremy Saulnier (Murder Party, Blue Ruin) continues one of the best streaks in independent horror with this terrifying and inventive thriller." Lenika Cruz of The Atlantic said it's "a tense gore-fest, one that’s as grimy and claustrophobic as the titular room. But scrape off the scum, and you’ll find Green Room full of visual artistry, dark humor, smart writing, and glints of humanity". IGN awarded it a score of 9 out of 10, saying, "This follow-up to the brilliant Blue Ruin pits a rock band against white supremacists with ace, ultra-violent results."

Jeffrey Bloomer of Slate favorably compared the film's "genre maturity", "amoral survivalism and malleable sense of good and evil", "brutal efficiency" and "weary humor" to John Carpenter's Assault on Precinct 13 and praised the cast, writing "If the world knows any justice [...] then the Screen Actors Guild will remember this cast when it doles out its awards next year". James Berardinelli concludes the film is "for anyone who enjoys sitting through 90 tense minutes and feeling the attendant adrenaline rush. It’s like a well-constructed horror movie" that's "As intimate as it is unnerving". Guy Lodge of Variety called it "a technically sharp backwoods horror-thriller that lacks a human element". Leslie Felperin of The Hollywood Reporter wrote that it's entertaining but "less disciplined, less original and less memorable work than Blue Ruin".

=== Top ten lists ===
Green Room was listed on many film critics' top ten yearly lists.

- 2nd – Josh Bell, Las Vegas Weekly
- 3rd – Nick Schager, Esquire
- 3rd – Jesse Hassenger, The A.V. Club
- 4th – Eric D. Snider, Salt Lake City Weekly
- 4th – A.A. Dowd, The A.V. Club
- 4th – Katie Rife, The A.V. Club
- 4th – Rob Hunter, Film School Rejects
- 5th – Steve Davis, The Austin Chronicle
- 5th – Noel Murray, The A.V. Club
- 5th – Jacob Oller, RogerEbert.com
- 5th – Alan Zilberman, RogerEbert.com
- 6th – Andrew Wright, Salt Lake City Weekly
- 6th – Mark Dujsik, RogerEbert.com
- 7th – Marc Doyle, Metacritic
- 7th – Haleigh Foutch, Collider
- 7th – Jen Yamato, The Daily Beast
- 7th – Sean Mulvihill, RogerEbert.com
- 8th – David Chen, /Film
- 8th – Jacob Hall, /Film
- 9th – Josh Kupecki, The Austin Chronicle
- 9th – Robert Horton, Seattle Weekly
- 9th – Jason Bailey, Flavorwire
- 10th – Vince Mancini, Uproxx

=== Accolades ===
Year	Award	Category	Recipient(s)	Result	Ref.
2015	Neuchâtel International Fantastic Film Festival	H.R. Giger «Narcisse» Award	Green Room	Won	
2015	Neuchâtel International Fantastic Film Festival	Audience Award	Green Room	Won	
2015	Neuchâtel International Fantastic Film Festival	Denis-de-Rougemont Youth Award	Green Room	Won	
2015	Deauville Film Festival	Grand Prix	Green Room	Nominated	
2015	Toronto International Film Festival	Grolsch People's Choice Midnight Madness Award	Green Room	3rd place	
2015	Austin Fantastic Fest	Audience Award	Green Room	1st place	
2015	Festival du nouveau cinéma	Temps Ø People's Choice Award	Green Room	Won	
2015	IndieWire Critics' Poll	Most Anticipated Film of 2016	Green Room	3rd place	
2016	BloodGuts UK Horror Awards	Best Original Film	Green Room	Nominated	
2016	BloodGuts UK Horror Awards	Best Actor	Anton Yelchin	Nominated	
2016	BloodGuts UK Horror Awards	Best Screenplay/Script	Jeremy Saulnier	Nominated	
2016	National Board of Review Awards	Top Ten Independent Films	Green Room	Won	
2016	Fright Meter Awards	Best Horror Movie	Green Room	Nominated	
2016	Fright Meter Awards	Best Actor in a Leading Role	Anton Yelchin	Nominated	
2016	Fright Meter Awards	Best Supporting Actress	Imogen Poots	Nominated	
2016	Fright Meter Awards	Best Supporting Actor	Patrick Stewart	Nominated	
2016	Fright Meter Awards	Best Score	Brooke Blair; Will Blair	Nominated	
2017	Fangoria Chainsaw Awards	Best Film	Green Room	Nominated	
2017	Fangoria Chainsaw Awards	Best Actor	Anton Yelchin	Nominated	
2017	Fangoria Chainsaw Awards	Best Supporting Actor	Patrick Stewart	Nominated	
2017	Fangoria Chainsaw Awards	Best Makeup & SFX	Wayne Eaton	Won	
2017	Empire Awards	Best Horror	Green Room	Nominated	
2017	Seattle Film Critics Awards	Best Villain	Patrick Stewart	Nominated	
