= John Merriman (actor) =

American actor and filmmaker

- Born: Houston, Texas, U.S.
- Education: Connecticut College
- Occupations: Actor; filmmaker
- Years active: 1990s–present

John Merriman is an American actor and filmmaker based in Austin, Texas. He is known for his roles in Gretchen (2006), You Hurt My Feelings (2011), Pit Stop (2013), Loves Her Gun (2013), Mustang Island (2017), and Sister Aimee (2019). He wrote, directed, and starred in the comedy feature My Name Is Buttons (2002) with Courtney Davis and multiple short films with Kerri Lendo, including Sleep Study (2010). He has also worked for the Austin Film Festival, SXSW Comedy, and the Moontower Comedy Festival, variously as a programmer, moderator, blogger, and host.

== Early life ==
Merriman was born in Houston, Texas, and graduated from Connecticut College with a degree in psychology. He has lived in Austin since 1996.

== Career ==
=== Acting ===
Merriman began acting in Austin independent films in the late 1990s, frequently collaborating with filmmaker Steve Collins and actress Courtney Davis. He appeared opposite Davis in several of Collins's early shorts, including The Ballad of Courtney and James (2001) and Lonelyland (2002), an Audience Award winner at the Cinematexas International Short Film Festival. Their Gretchen and the Night Danger (2003) won the jury award for Best Short Film at SXSW in 2004 and served as the basis for Collins's feature debut Gretchen (2006), in which Merriman played Ricky. The film won the Target Filmmaker Award at the Los Angeles Film Festival, where the jury praised its "distinctive vision and truthfulness to its characters." Around that time, Merriman starred in Scott Rice's short film Perils in Nude Modeling (2003), a finalist at the Student Academy Awards and winner of Best College Short at the U.S. Comedy Arts Festival.

Merriman played the lead in Collins's sophomore feature You Hurt My Feelings (2011), which premiered at the Los Angeles Film Festival and was named a New York Times Critic's Pick; the Austin American-Statesman wrote that he "gives a captivating and heart-aching performance." He starred in Pictures of Superheroes (2012), in which Film Threat found him "at his somewhat crazy-eyed and slightly creepy best." He also starred in the comedy Cinema Six (2012), which featured Bill Hader and premiered at the Dallas International Film Festival, where IndieWire wrote that he "handles comedy and drama with equal ease."

In 2013 he appeared in Yen Tan's Pit Stop, which premiered at the Sundance Film Festival and was nominated for the John Cassavetes Award at the Independent Spirit Awards; The Moveable Fest singled out his character's first-date scene as "an enjoyable detour that parallels how hard it is for anyone to find love." That same year he took a dramatic turn as an abusive husband in Geoff Marslett's Loves Her Gun, winner of the SXSW Lone Star Award and a New York Times Critic's Pick. Also in 2013, he starred in the music video for Black Joe Lewis's "Come to My Party", directed by Vern Moen. He followed with the ensemble sports comedy Balls Out (2014), another New York Times Critic's Pick, which premiered at the Tribeca Film Festival. He also appeared opposite Larry Miller in Michael Fry's live-action/animated short New Soul (2015), which had its world premiere at the Cinequest Film Festival. On television, Merriman played Zeke in "Austin: End of the Road", the Austin-set episode of the Seeso travel-parody series Hidden America with Jonah Ray (2016).

In Mustang Island (2017), which the Austin Chronicle called "pitch-perfect," Merriman received the Clint Howard Character Actor Award at the Sidewalk Film Festival; the film also won a Special Jury Prize at the Dallas International Film Festival. He appeared in Sister Aimee (2019), a screwball retelling of evangelist Aimee Semple McPherson's disappearance that premiered at the Sundance Film Festival, playing one of the two detectives whose interviews structure the film.

In Collins's I've Got Issues (2019), narrated by Jim Gaffigan and likened by the Austin Chronicle to the work of Quentin Dupieux, Todd Solondz, and Tim Heidecker, the New York Times counted him among the "small stable of reliable actors" Collins regularly works with. He appeared as the protagonist's boss in Chris Beier's thriller The Ego Death of Queen Cecilia (2024), winner of the Industry and Programmers' Choice Award at Dances With Films NY; Cinapse singled him out as "the sweetest jerk-boss of all time." In 2025 he portrayed Luciano Pavarotti in Todd Rohal's Fuck My Son!, an X-rated comedy Variety placed in the tradition of underground provocateurs such as John Waters and George Kuchar; it premiered in the Midnight Madness section of the Toronto International Film Festival.

Merriman has also performed with Austin's Old Murder House Theater, a troupe whose live re-creations of films Wired described as "equal parts Michel Gondry and midnight madness," in productions including Aliens on Ice, Jurassic Live, and Jaws.

Merriman has appeared as a guest on Office Hours Live with Tim Heidecker. In 2025, he performed in Kill Timmy, Heidecker's live parody of Kill Tony.

=== Filmmaking ===
Merriman co-wrote, co-directed, co-produced, and starred in the independent feature My Name Is Buttons (2002) with Courtney Davis. Structured as a reverse Flowers for Algernon, the film follows Hunter (Merriman), a cynical, anti-corporate dissident who is given a drug that makes him happier by dulling his mind. It borrows elements of Forrest Gump, Patch Adams, and The Other Sister to satirize the pharmaceutical industry and a culture willing to trade intelligence for happiness. The film premiered at the Austin Film Festival and won Best in Show at the Red Wasp Film Festival; the Austin Chronicle called it "tremendously funny".

With Kerri Lendo, he co-wrote, co-directed, and starred in the short film Sleep Study (2010), which won the Audience Award for Narrative Short at the Austin Film Festival and screened at AFI Fest, the Los Angeles Film Festival, and the Maryland Film Festival. The pair later collaborated on the comedic shorts Sounds Good, Nobody, and Modern Man, which screened in the opening-night program of the 2012 Maryland Film Festival.

=== Festival work ===
From 2004 to 2008, Merriman worked as a programmer for the Austin Film Festival, where he oversaw documentary programming, coordinated marquee screenings, and helped create the Comedy Vanguard section and the Funniest Filmmaker in Austin competition. He has also remained involved with the festival as a moderator and interviewer, hosting filmmaker Q&As, panels, and conversations with guests including Charlie Kaufman, Keenen Ivory Wayans, Larry Wilmore, and Paula Pell, some of which were later broadcast on On Story, a public television series carried in most PBS markets nationwide.

From 2010 to 2012, he worked for SXSW Comedy, assisting with programming and writing for the festival's official blog. His posts included interviews with Kyle Kinane, Chelsea Peretti, and Hari Kondabolu and recaps of SXSW Comedy shows.

From 2012 to 2018, Merriman and Kerri Lendo co-hosted and co-produced Inside Joke, a Moontower Comedy Festival web interview series featuring comedians including Marc Maron, Maria Bamford, and Steven Wright. Merriman also served as Moontower's official year-round blogger and has moderated festival events including a panel with the cast of Barry and a Q&A with Dana Gould and Bobcat Goldthwait.

== Selected filmography ==
| Year | Title | Role | Notes |
|---|---|---|---|
| 2001 | The Ballad of Courtney and James | James | Short film |
| 2002 | My Name Is Buttons | Hunter / Buttons | also co-writer, co-director, and co-producer |
| 2002 | Lonelyland | James | Short film |
| 2003 | Gretchen and the Night Danger | Ricky Marichino | Short film |
| 2003 | Perils in Nude Modeling | Ted Minor | Short film; finalist, 31st Student Academy Awards |
| 2004 | Milton Is a Shitbag | Milton | Short film |
| 2006 | Gretchen | Ricky Marichino | |
| 2007 | A Yeti in the City | Det. Mel Ursus / GG Hunters Ghost / Narrator | |
| 2010 | Sleep Study | Therapist | Short film; also co-writer and co-director |
| 2011 | You Hurt My Feelings | John | also associate producer |
| 2011 | Slacker 2011 | Grad Student | Segment film |
| 2011 | Neptune Calling! | Neptune | Short film; segment of the omnibus film Orbit(film) |
| 2012 | Pictures of Superheroes | Joe | |
| 2012 | Cinema Six | Mason | |
| 2012 | The Man from Orlando | DJ | |
| 2012 | Pirate101 | Bishop | Video game; voice role |
| 2012 | Modern Man | Man | Short film; also co-writer and co-director |
| 2012 | J.P.B.F. | Interviewer | Short film |
| 2013 | Pit Stop | Winston | |
| 2013 | Loves Her Gun | Neighbor Don | |
| 2014 | Balls Out | Fireman | Premiered as Intramural |
| 2015 | New Soul | New Soul | Short film |
| 2017 | Mustang Island | John | |
| 2019 | Sister Aimee | Detective Smith | |
| 2019 | I've Got Issues | Various | |
| 2019 | Sweet Steel | The Guy | Short film |
| 2024 | The Ego Death of Queen Cecilia | Noah | |
| 2025 | Fuck My Son! | Luciano Pavarotti | |
