= Samantha Buck and Marie Schlingmann =

Film writers and directors

Samantha Buck
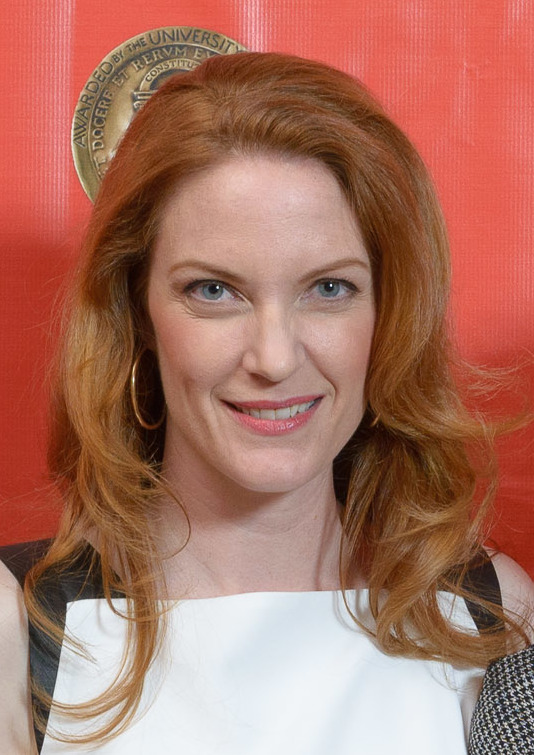
- Samantha Buck receiving the Peabody for Best Kept Secret
- Born: Samantha Susan Buck; December 20, 1974 (age 51); Dallas, Texas, U.S.
- Occupations: Director, actress, screenwriter
- Years active: 1997–present
- Spouse: Marie Schlingmann

Marie Schlingmann
- Born: Berlin, Germany
- Occupations: Director, screenwriter
- Spouse: Samantha Buck

Samantha Buck and Marie Schlingmann are film writers and directors who have made five films together. Buck is also an actress who directed the documentary Best Kept Secret solo. They are best known for the 2019 film Sister Aimee.

== Personal life and education ==
Buck and Schlingmann are married, having met at Columbia University. Both have a Master of Fine Arts in film from Columbia, and in this program, they created their first short films together. The pair have won various grants for female directors. Schlingmann is from Berlin, and though she is German, she writes screenplays in English, saying that her "creative brain" is in this language.

== Career ==
In her acting career, Buck played Det. G. Lynn Bishop in Law & Order: Criminal Intent and Amy on the comedy series Stella. She became interested in film production when starring on Big Apple; the showrunner made the cast take writing workshops and encouraged her talents. She explained that it took her several years after this to follow through because, at the time, very few actresses had transitioned to behind the camera. She did not begin with writing, but took up documentary in the cinéma vérité style, where she was "basically writing in the edit room with 100 hours of footage". In 2013, she directed the Gotham Award-nominated and Peabody Award-winning documentary film Best Kept Secret. During the production of Best Kept Secret, Buck applied and was accepted to Columbia's film program.

The couple first made films at Columbia University, directing two award-winning short films: Canary and The Mink Catcher. The latter was shown at the Telluride Film Festival and the South by Southwest. Their first feature film as a duo was slated to be an adaptation of the young adult novel Need in 2016, as a thriller financed by Covert Media. This year, they also began developing the feature film The Big D, which they are still developing in 2019. The Mink Catcher and The Big D are set in Dallas, Texas. Their breakthrough feature came a few years later in 2019's Sister Aimee, loosely based on Aimee Semple McPherson's story. Sister Aimee screened at the Sundance Film Festival in 2019, and is planned to have a theatrical run and video on demand release in 2020.

== Production filmography ==
Year	Title	Buck	Schlingmann	Notes
2008	The Reasons We Were Dangerous		Co-director, editor, producer	Documentary
2009	21 Below	Director		Documentary
2012	The Death of Hercules		Director, writer	Short
2013	Best Kept Secret	Director, writer, co-producer	Thanks	Documentary
2013	Lawn Care	Producer	Director, writer	
2014	Glacial Erratics	Director	Writer, producer	
2015	The Mink Catcher	Director, writer	Writer, producer	
2016	Canary	Writer, producer	Director, writer	
2019	Sister Aimee	Director, writer	Director, writer	

== Buck acting filmography ==
=== Film ===
Year	Title	Role	Notes
1997	The Sticky Fingers of Time	Gorge	
1997	In & Out	Classroom Student	
1998	Fiona	Supervisor	
1999	The 24 Hour Woman	Deanne	
2000	Wirey Spindell	Samantha	
2000	Calling Bobcat	Judy	
2002	Searching for Paradise	Andrea	
2002	Heartbreak Hospital	Sandy	
2006	Fearless	Journalist	
2006	Kettle of Fish	Mother	
2008	Woman in Burka	Samantha	Short film
2012	Gayby	Sophia	
2012	Hellbenders	Penelope	
2012	What Maisie Knew	Zoe's Mother	
2018	Summertime	Ruth	
2018	Private Life	Psychologist	
2020	The Night House	Becky McLaughlin	

=== Television ===
Year	Title	Role	Notes
2000	Law & Order: Special Victims Unit	Waitress	Episode: "Entitled"
2000	Third Watch	Vangie Sundstrom	Recurring role (5 episodes)
2001	Big Apple	Brigid McNamara	Regular role (5 episodes)
2003	Sex and the City	Margot	Episode: "A Woman's Right to Shoes"
2003–2004	Law & Order: Criminal Intent	Det. G. Lynn Bishop	Recurring role (7 episodes)
2005	Stella	Amy	Regular role (6 episodes)
2007	Six Degrees	Susan Harriman	Recurring role (5 episodes)
2007	Wainy Days	Concerned Woman	Episode: "The Pickup"
2008	Z Rock	Kitty Braunstein	3 episodes
2013	Golden Boy	Tara Brunell	TV series
2013	Blue Bloods	Sheri Dean	Episode: "Ends and Means"
2014	Boardwalk Empire	Apartment Hunting Wife	Episode: "Eldorado"
2015	Public Morals	Sister Paul Eugene	1 episode
2016	Vinyl	Allison	2 episodes
2016	Unbreakable Kimmy Schmidt	Sophie Van Nuys	
2016	Person of Interest	Samaritan Doctor	1 episode
2020	Hightown	Meredith	1 episode
