= Jeremy Saulnier =

American filmmaker (born 1976)

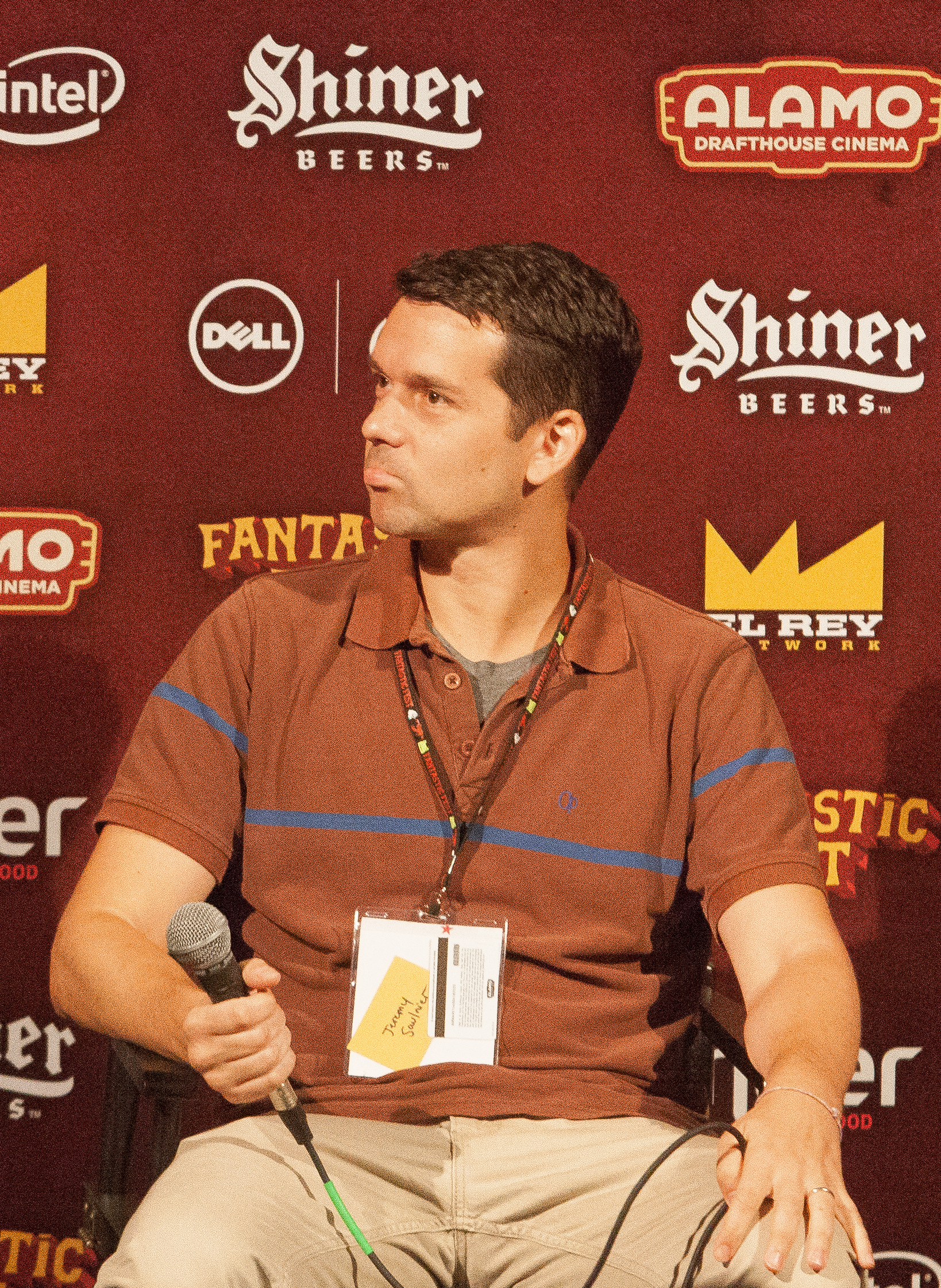
- Saulnier in 2015
- Born: June 10, 1976 (age 50); Alexandria, Virginia, U.S.
- Education: New York University (BFA)
- Known for: Film director, cinematographer, screenwriter
- Spouse: Skei Saulnier
- Children: 3

Jeremy Saulnier (/soʊˈnjeɪ/ soh-NYAY; born June 10, 1976) is an American film director.

== Early life and education ==
Saulnier was born on June 10, 1976, in Alexandria, Virginia. He graduated from New York University in 1998 with a Bachelor of Fine Arts in filmmaking with honors.

== Career ==
In 2007, he released his first feature film, Murder Party which he wrote and directed starring his childhood friend, Macon Blair.

In 2013, he released Blue Ruin which was met with critical acclaim. He was nominated for the John Cassavetes Award at the 2015 Film Independent Spirit Awards and made a run at Cannes.

In 2015, Saulnier directed his third feature film, the horror-thriller Green Room, which stars Patrick Stewart, Anton Yelchin, and Imogen Poots.

Saulnier's next film was an adaptation of William Giraldi's 2014 thriller novel Hold the Dark for Netflix, from a screenplay by Macon Blair.

In 2024, he directed Rebel Ridge, which won the Primetime Emmy Award for Outstanding Movie.

== Filmography ==
=== Short film ===
Year	Title	Director	Writer	DoP
1998	Goldfarb	Yes	No	Yes
2004	Crabwalk	Yes	Yes	Yes

=== Feature film ===
Year	Title	Director	Writer	Producer	Notes
2007	Murder Party	Yes	Yes	Executive	Also casting director, cinematographer and camera operator
2013	Blue Ruin	Yes	Yes	No	Also cinematographer
2015	Green Room	Yes	Yes	No	
2018	Hold the Dark	Yes	No	No	
2024	Rebel Ridge	Yes	Yes	Yes	Also editor
2027	Slayground	Yes	Yes	Yes	Post production

Cinematographer only

- Hamilton (2006)
- 'Tis Autumn: The Search for Jackie Paris (2006) (Documentary)
- Putty Hill (2010)
- Septien (2011)
- You Hurt My Feelings (2011)
- Rett: There is Hope (2011) (Documentary)
- In Our Nature (2012)
- See Girl Run (2012)
- The Art of Boxing (2012) (Documentary short)
- I Used to Be Darker (2013)

=== Television ===
Year	Title	Episode(s)
2013	The Killer Speaks	"Mad Maks: Maksim Gelman"
2019	True Detective	"The Great War and Modern Memory"
2019	True Detective	"Kiss Tomorrow Goodbye"
