= Apollo 10½: A Space Age Childhood =

2022 animated film by Richard Linklater

- Release poster
- Directed by: Richard Linklater
- Written by: Richard Linklater
- Produced by: Richard Linklater; Tommy Pallotta; Mike Blizzard; Femke Wolting; Bruno Felix
- Starring: Glen Powell; Zachary Levi; Jack Black
- Cinematography: Shane F. Kelly
- Edited by: Sandra Adair
- Production companies: Netflix Animation Studios; Minnow Mountain; Submarine; Detour Filmproduction
- Distributed by: Netflix
- Release dates: March 13, 2022 (SXSW); March 24, 2022 (United States)
- Running time: 98 minutes
- Country: United States
- Language: English

Apollo 10½: A Space Age Childhood is a 2022 American animated coming of age drama film set during the events preceding the Apollo 11 Moon landing, loosely based on the childhood of writer, director, and producer Richard Linklater. It presents a fictional tale of a fourth-grader who becomes the first person to land on the Moon. The film stars Glen Powell, Zachary Levi, and Jack Black.

Linklater, who conceived the film in 2004, planned to film it in live action, but instead pursued an animation style influenced by Saturday morning cartoons due to the playful nature of animation. Home movies created in Houston, Texas during the 1960s were used for research with some included in the film. Principal photography began in February 2020 at Robert Rodriguez's Troublemaker Studios in Austin, Texas, and wrapped in March 2020. Parts of the filming were done in front of the largest green screen in Texas, while other parts, which were shot in live-action, were animated during post-production using a technique similar to the rotoscoping used in Linklater's Waking Life (2001) and A Scanner Darkly (2006).

Apollo 10½ premiered at South by Southwest on March 13, 2022, and was released in select theaters on March 24, 2022, before premiering on Netflix on April 1. It received positive reviews, with praise for its writing, visuals, and nostalgic feel.

== Plot ==
Stanley is a boy in the 1960s living with his and five siblings in the quickly-growing suburbs of El Lago, Texas. His dad works an office job at NASA. Stanley grows up living frugally, watching the newly-invented color TV, and playing with other kids in his neighborhood. Despite issues such as nuclear threats from the Cold War, the Vietnam War, and overpopulation, NASA brings Stanley's family optimism about the future. Stanley enthusiastically learns about the Mercury program and the then-ongoing Apollo program, and speculates with classmates on the existence of alien life.

In 1969, 10-year-old Stanley is on the playground at his elementary school when NASA officials approach him and inform him that he has been selected for a secret mission to the Moon. The engineers at NASA had accidentally built the capsule too small, and only a child would fit. As an athletic and high-achieving student, Stanley is a good fit for the program. He is prohibited to talk about the mission with anyone, even his family. He begins mission training that summer, under the cover of summer camp.

During training, Stanley practices survival techniques such as hunting, fishing, and making clothes from his parachute. He is trained to fly the small module, which is named the Apollo 10½. He also operates a Lunar Landing Training Vehicle, and practices landing it on the Moon in simulations.

After his training is complete, Apollo 10½ launches flawlessly. Stanley travels to the Moon, lands, and returns to Earth without any problems. However, his mission is still kept a secret, and he is still not allowed to tell anyone about it.

Later, Apollo 11 launches, much to the excitement of Stanley and his family. During the astronauts' four-day ride to the Moon, Stanley and his family go to a drive-in movie theater, the beach, and Astroworld.

Returning home, Stanley and his family watch Apollo 11 crew's descent to the Moon. The approach is rocky, and the astronauts have to manually control and land the Lunar Module. However, they ultimately successfully land on the Moon and Neil Armstrong takes his first steps. Stanley reflects on his secret mission, Apollo 11, and the space program.

== Voice cast ==
- Milo Coy as Stanley
  - Jack Black as adult Stanley
- Glen Powell as Bostick, NASA official
- Zachary Levi as Kranz, NASA official
- Josh Wiggins as Steve
- Lee Eddy as Mom
- Bill Wise as Dad
- Natalie L'Amoreaux as Vicky
- Jessica Brynn Cohen as Jana
- Noella (formerly Sam) Chipman as Greg
- Danielle Guilbot as Stephanie

== Production ==
Linklater originally got the idea for the film in 2004. In February 2018, it was announced Linklater would direct the film from a screenplay he wrote. In July 2020, it was announced Glen Powell, Jack Black, Zachary Levi, Josh Wiggins, Milo Coy, Lee Eddy, Bill Wise, Natalie L'Amoreaux, Jessica Brynn Cohen, Sam Chipman and Danielle Guilbot had joined the cast of the film, with Netflix distributing.

Linklater was planning to create the film in live action but instead decided to go with an animation style influenced by Saturday morning cartoons because of the playful nature of animation. Home movies created in Houston, Texas during the 1960s were used for research, with some also included in the film.

Principal photography began in February 2020 at Robert Rodriguez's Troublemaker Studios in Austin, Texas, and wrapped in March 2020. Linklater spent much of the time during the COVID-19 pandemic editing the film.

=== Setting ===
The film is set in Houston in the 1960s, during the Space Race.

=== Filming ===
Parts of the filming were done in front of the largest green screen in Texas, and everything the characters did not interact with or touch was animated in post-production. Parts of the film, which were shot in live-action, were animated during post-production using a technique similar to the rotoscoping used in Linklater's Waking Life (2001) and A Scanner Darkly (2006). After initially being denied eligibility for the Animated Feature category by the Academy of Motion Picture Arts and Sciences for using the stylized animation approach, their appeal, with support from fellow directors and animators, reversed the decision.

== Release ==
Apollo 10½: A Space Age Childhood premiered as a headliner at the 2022 South by Southwest Film Festival on March 13, 2022. When the official trailer was released, the release date was announced for April 1, 2022, which is when it premiered on Netflix. The film was screened in select theaters on March 24, 2022.

== Reception ==
Review aggregator website Rotten Tomatoes reports that 91% of 144 sampled critics gave the film a positive review, with an average rating of 7.9/10. The site's critics consensus reads, "The sweetly nostalgic Apollo 10 1/2: A Space Age Childhood finds Richard Linklater reusing visual and thematic ingredients in a deeply personal, freshly inspired way." On Metacritic, the film has a weighted average score of 79 out of 100 based on 39 critics, indicating "generally favorable" reviews.

Apollo 10½ was ranked seventh on Cahiers du Cinéma's top 10 films of 2022 list.

=== Accolades ===
| Award | Date of ceremony | Category | Result | Ref. |
|---|---|---|---|---|
| Washington D.C. Area Film Critics Association | December 12, 2022 | Best Animated Feature | Nominated | |
| Chicago Film Critics Association | December 14, 2022 | Best Animated Film | Nominated | |
| St. Louis Gateway Film Critics Association | December 18, 2022 | Best Animated Film | Nominated | |
| San Francisco Bay Area Film Critics Circle | January 9, 2023 | Best Animated Feature | Nominated | |
| Austin Film Critics Association | January 10, 2023 | Best Animated Film | Nominated | |
| Austin Film Critics Association | January 10, 2023 | Best Austin Film | Nominated | |
| Georgia Film Critics Association | January 13, 2023 | Best Animated Film | Nominated | |
| Online Film Critics Society | January 23, 2023 | Best Animated Feature | Nominated | |
| Houston Film Critics Society | February 18, 2023 | Best Animated Feature | Nominated | |
| Houston Film Critics Society | February 18, 2023 | Texas Independent Film Award | Won | |

== See also ==
- Apollo 11 in popular culture
