= Camp Camp =

American web series

- Genre: Adult animation; Adventure; Black comedy; Comedy drama; Musical
- Created by: Jordan Cwierz; Miles Luna
- Developed by: Jordan Cwierz; Gray G. Haddock; Miles Luna; Kerry Shawcross
- Written by: Jordan Cwierz; Gray G. Haddock; Miles Luna; Kerry Shawcross; Eddy Rivas; Joe Nicolosi; Oren Mendez; Leigh Lahav
- Directed by: Jordan Cwierz
- Voices of: Michael Jones; Miles Luna; Elizabeth Maxwell; Yuri Lowenthal; Lee Eddy; Travis Willingham; Shannon McCormick; Krishna Kumar; Kaitlin Becker
- Composer: Benjamin Zecker
- Country of origin: United States
- Original language: English
- No. of seasons: 5
- No. of episodes: 64

Production
- Executive producers: Burnie Burns (Note: Seasons 1–4); Matt Hullum; Jordan Cwierz (Note: Season 4); Hannah McCarthy (Note: Season 5); Jordan Levin; Kerry Shawcross
- Producers: Gray G. Haddock (Note: Credited as supervising producer; Seasons 1–4); Maggie Tominey (Note: Seasons 1–4); Koen Wooten (Note: Credited as supervising producer; Season 4); Austin Harper (Note: Credited as associate producer; Season 4 then supervising producer; Season 5); Minni Clark (Note: Credited as associate producer; Season 4); Sam Mitchell
- Running time: 11–30 minutes
- Production company: Rooster Teeth

Original release
- Network: RoosterTeeth.com; YouTube
- Release: June 10, 2016 – March 22, 2024

Camp Camp is an American adult animated web series created by Jordan Cwierz and Miles Luna for Rooster Teeth. It revolves around the misadventures of attendants and camp counselors of Camp Campbell summer camp, in particular protagonist Max and counselor David. The series premiered on June 10, 2016, as part of Rooster Teeth's Summer of Animation promotion, and was released on both the Rooster Teeth website and YouTube channel. After the fourth season concluded in 2019, the series had an extended hiatus until a special episode was released in 2023. The fifth season premiered on March 1, 2024.

The series ended following Rooster Teeth's shutdown in May 2024 and became unavailable to view online. In 2025, Rooster Teeth co-founder Burnie Burns acquired the Camp Camp intellectual property, among other former Rooster Teeth assets, and the series was made available once again.

== Premise ==
The series follows the exploits of a group of campers and their counselors during their stay at the dysfunctional, horribly run-down summer "camp camp" Camp Campbell; primarily on a young boy named Max (Michael Jones and Krishna Kumar), a jaded ten-year-old who is forced to go to Camp Campbell, but makes two friends, Nikki (Elizabeth Maxwell) and Neil (Yuri Lowenthal), who help him constantly torment their camp counselors David (Miles Luna) and Gwen (Lee Eddy and Kaitlin Becker).

== Voice cast and characters ==
=== Main ===
- Michael Jones (seasons 1–4) and Krishna Kumar (2023 special–season 5) as Max
- Elizabeth Maxwell as Nicolette "Nikki"
- Yuri Lowenthal as Neil
- Miles Luna as David
- Lee Eddy (seasons 1–4) and Kaitlin Becker (2023 special–season 5) as Gwendolyn "Gwen"
- Travis Willingham (seasons 1–4) and Ian Sinclair (2019 special) as Cameron Campbell
- Shannon McCormick as Quartermaster
  - McCormick also voices Farmer's Almanac and Quartersister
- Armando Torres as Cameron Junior "CJ" Campbell (season 5)

=== Recurring ===
- Blaine Gibson as Gaylord "Nurf" Nurfington
- Yotam Perel as Magic Kid / Harrison
- Barbara Dunkelman (seasons 1–4) and BlackKrystel (2023 special – season 5) as Nerris
- Lindsay Jones as Space Kid / Neil Armstrong Jr.
- Jen Brown as Meredith "Ered" Miller
- James Willems as Dolph Houston
- Georden Whitman (seasons 1–2) and Nicholaus Weindel (seasons 3–5) as Preston Goodplay
- Jordan Cwierz, Alena Lecorchick and Miles Luna as the Platypus
- Samantha Ireland as Sasha, Tabii, and Erin, the Flower Scouts
- Kirk Johnson as Edward Pikeman
- Dante Basco as Billy "Snake" Nikssilp
- Jordan Cwierz as Jermy Fartz

=== Guest ===
- Josh Ornelas as Sheriff
- Maggie Tominey as Jen and Larry the Hamster
- Cole Gallian as The Squirrels
- Tyler Coe as Announcer
- Mariel Salcedo as Teen Mom
- Griffin McElroy as Jasper
- Carla Nickerson as Bonquisha
- Jeremy Dooley and Patrick Rodriguez as Agent #1 and #2
- Kendra Ziegler as Angry Camper
- Stan Lewis as Barkeep
- Connor Pickens as Lester
- Kyle Taylor as Customer Fred
- Sean Baird as Bouncer
- Miles Luna as Rob Boss
- Evan Gregory as Daniel
- Eddy Rivas as Rafael Guzmán
- Jessica Vasami as Penelope Priss
- Rocco Botte as Dirty Kevin
- Stevie Nelson as Candy (Nikki's mom)
- Matt Chapman as Carl (Neil's dad) and Graggle
- Matt Hullum as Lt. Stuart Houston; the Bird of Lilac; and Trenchcoat Man
- Ryan Haywood (seasons 2–4) as Agents Miller (Ered's fathers)
- Elyse Willems as Mrs. Nurfington (Nurf's mother)
- Shawn Chatfield and Becca Frasier as Nerris' parents
- Jon Risinger and Jen Brown as Harrison's parents
- Lawrence Sonntag as Buzz Aldrin (Space Kid's uncle)
- Jen Brown as Gram Gram (Preston's grandmother)
- Melissa Sternenberg as Mrs. Campwell
- Patricia Summersett as Ainsley
- Chris Cubas as Louis (Gwen's dad)
- Rico Bonet as Xemüg
- Richie Branson as Jake Stonewall
- Sarah Natochenny as Vera
- SungWon Cho as Brian
- Stephen Fu as Hwan
- Alex Mai as Dang

== Episodes ==
"Escape from Camp Campbell", the first episode of Camp Camp

Season	Episodes	Originally released	
Season	Episodes	First released	Last released
1	12	June 10, 2016	September 9, 2016
2	12	June 9, 2017	August 25, 2017
Holiday Specials		October 6, 2017	December 11, 2017
3	12	May 25, 2018	August 10, 2018
Holiday Specials		October 5, 2018	December 7, 2018
4	18	June 1, 2019	September 28, 2019
Holiday Special		December 22, 2019	
Summer Special		July 7, 2023	
5	4	March 1, 2024	March 22, 2024

=== Season 1 (2016) ===
No. overall	No. in season	Title	Directed by	Written by	Original release date	Prod. code
1	1	"Escape from Camp Campbell"	Jordan Cwierz	Jordan Cwierz; Miles Luna	June 10, 2016	1LBF01
2	2	"Mascot"	Jordan Cwierz	Kerry Shawcross	June 17, 2016	1LBF02
3	3	"Scout's Dishonor"	Jordan Cwierz	Miles Luna	June 24, 2016	1LBF04
4	4	"Camp Cool Kidz"	Jordan Cwierz	Jordan Cwierz	July 1, 2016	1LBF03
5	5	"Journey to Spooky Island"	Jordan Cwierz	Gray Haddock	July 8, 2016	1LBF06
6	6	"Reigny Day"	Jordan Cwierz	Kerry Shawcross	July 22, 2016	1LBF05
7	7	"Romeo & Juliet II: Love Resurrected"	Jordan Cwierz	Jordan Cwierz	July 29, 2016	1LBF07
8	8	"Into Town"	Jordan Cwierz	Gray Haddock	August 5, 2016	1LBF08
9	9	"David Gets Hard"	Jordan Cwierz	Miles Luna	August 19, 2016	1LBF09
10	10	"Mind Freakers"	Jordan Cwierz	Jordan Cwierz	August 26, 2016	1LBF10
11	11	"Camporee"	Jordan Cwierz	Miles Luna	September 2, 2016	1LBF11
12	12	"The Order of the Sparrow"	Jordan Cwierz	Unknown	September 9, 2016	1LBF12

=== Season 2 (2017) ===
No. overall	No. in season	Title	Directed by	Written by	Original release date	Prod. code
13	1	"Cult Camp"	Jordan Cwierz	Miles Luna	June 9, 2017	2LBF01
14	2	"Anti-Social Network"	Jordan Cwierz	Gray Haddock	June 16, 2017	2LBF02
15	3	"Quest to Sleepy Peak Peak"	Jordan Cwierz	Jordan Cwierz	June 23, 2017	2LBF03
16	4	"Jermy Fartz"	Jordan Cwierz	Jordan Cwierz; Miles Luna	June 30, 2017	2LBF04
17	5	"Jasper Dies at the End"	Jordan Cwierz	Jordan Cwierz	July 7, 2017	2LBF05
18	6	"Quartermaster Appreciation Day"	Jordan Cwierz	Kerry Shawcross	July 14, 2017	2LBF06
19	7	"Bonjour Bonquisha"	Jordan Cwierz	Miles Luna	July 21, 2017	2LBF07
20	8	"Gwen Gets a Job"	Jordan Cwierz	Gray Haddock	July 28, 2017	2LBF08
21	9	"Eggs Benefits"	Jordan Cwierz	Jordan Cwierz; Miles Luna	August 4, 2017	2LBF08
22	10	"Space Camp Was a Hoax"	Jordan Cwierz	Kerry Shawcross	August 11, 2017	2LBF08
23	11	"Cookin' Cookies"	Jordan Cwierz	Miles Luna	August 18, 2017	2LBF08
24	12	"Parents' Day"	Jordan Cwierz	Jordan Cwierz; Miles Luna	August 25, 2017	2LBF08

=== Holiday Specials (2017) ===
No. overall	No. in season	Title	Directed by	Written by	Original release date	Prod. code
25	1	"NIGHT OF THE LIVING ILL"	Jordan Cwierz	Jordan Cwierz	October 6, 2017	2LBF09
26	2	"A Camp Camp Christmas, or Whatever"	Jordan Cwierz	Miles Luna	December 11, 2017	2LBF09

=== Season 3 (2018) ===
No. overall	No. in season	Title	Directed by	Written by	Original release date	Prod. code
27	1	"The Fun-Raiser"	Jordan Cwierz	Miles Luna	May 25, 2018	3LBF01
28	2	"Ered Gets Her Cool Back"	Jordan Cwierz	Eddy Rivas	June 1, 2018	3LBF02
29	3	"Foreign Exchange Campers"	Jordan Cwierz	Eddy Rivas	June 8, 2018	3LBF03
30	4	"Nikki's Last Day on Earth"	Jordan Cwierz; Leigh Lahav; Oren Mendez	Jordan Cwierz	June 15, 2018	3LBF04
31	5	"Dial M For Jasper"	Jordan Cwierz	Jordan Cwierz	June 22, 2018	3LBF05
32	6	"The Lake Lilac Summer Social"	Jordan Cwierz	Miles Luna	June 29, 2018	3LBF06
33	7	"Cameron Campbell the Camp Campbell Camper"	Jordan Cwierz; Yssa Badiola	Eddy Rivas	July 6, 2018	3LBF07
34	8	"Something Fishy"	Leigh Lahav; Oren Mendez	Jordan Cwierz	July 13, 2018	3LBF08
35	9	"The Candy Kingpin"	Joe Nicolosi	Jordan Cwierz	July 20, 2018	3LBF09
36	10	"Operation: Charlie Tango Foxtrot"	Jordan Cwierz; Yssa Badiola (co-director)	Jordan Cwierz	July 27, 2018	3LBF10
37	11	"City Survival"	Leigh Lahav; Oren Mendez	Jordan Cwierz	August 3, 2018	3LBF11
38	12	"Camp Corp."	Jordan Cwierz	Jordan Cwierz; Miles Luna; Eddy Rivas	August 10, 2018	3LBF11

=== Holiday Specials (2018) ===
No. overall	No. in season	Title	Directed by	Written by	Original release date	Prod. code
39	1	"Arrival of the Torso Takers"	Jordan Cwierz	Leigh Lahav; Oren Mendez	October 5, 2018	3LBF12
40	2	"Culture Day"	Jordan Cwierz	Leigh Lahav; Oren Mendez	December 7, 2018	3LBF12

=== Season 4 (2019) ===
No. overall	No. in season	Title	Directed by	Written by	Original release date	Prod. code
41	1	"Keep the Change"	Yssa Badiola; Jordan Cwierz	Jordan Cwierz; Miles Luna; Eddy Rivas	June 1, 2019	4LBF01
42	2	"Attack of the Nurfs"	Jordan Cwierz	Kirk Johnson	June 8, 2019	4LBF02
43	3	"Who Peed the Lake"	Jordan Cwierz	Leigh Lahav; Oren Mendez	June 15, 2019	4LBF03
44	4	"New Adventure!"	Yssa Badiola	Kirk Johnson	June 22, 2019	4LBF04
45	5	"The Quarter-Moon Convergence"	Yssa Badiola; Jordan Battle; Miles Luna	Jeff James	June 29, 2019	4LBF05
46	6	"Follow the Leader"	Yssa Badiola	Leigh Lahav; Oren Mendez	July 6, 2019	4LBF06
47	7	"Preston Goodplay's Good Play"	Jordan Cwierz	Kirk Johnson	July 13, 2019	4LBF07
48	8	"After Hours"	Yssa Badiola	Eddy Rivas	July 20, 2019	4LBF08
49	9	"Camp Loser Says What?"	Jordan Cwierz; Miles Luna	Jordan Cwierz	July 27, 2019	4LBF09
50	10	"Squirrel Camp"	Jordan Cwierz	Jeff James	August 3, 2019	4LBF10
51	11	"Cameron Campbell Can't Handle the Truth Serum"	Yssa Badiola	Kirk Johnson	August 10, 2019	4LBF11
52	12	"The Forest"	Joe Nicolosi	Joe Nicolosi	August 17, 2019	4LBF12
53	13	"Campfire Tales"	Jordan Cwierz	Jordan Cwierz; Leigh Lahav; Oren Mendez; Jeff James; Kirk Johnson; Miles Luna	August 24, 2019	4LBF13
54	14	"Fashion Victims"	Joe Nicolosi	Jeff James	August 31, 2019	4LBF14
55	15	"Party Pooper"	Yssa Badiola	Leigh Lahav; Oren Mendez	September 7, 2019	4LBF15
56	16	"Panicked Room"	Yssa Badiola	Kirk Johnson	September 14, 2019	4LBF16
57	17	"The Butterfinger Effect"	Jordan Battle	Eddy Rivas	September 21, 2019	4LBF17
58	18	"Time Crapsules"	Jordan Cwierz	Jordan Cwierz; Miles Luna	September 28, 2019	4LBF18

=== Holiday Special (2019) ===
No. overall	No. in season	Title	Directed by	Written by	Original release date	Prod. code
59	1	"St. Campbell's Day"	Jordan Battle	Joe Nicolosi	December 20, 2019	4LBF20

=== Summer Special (2023) ===
No. overall	No. in season	Title	Directed by	Written by	Original release date	Prod. code
60	1	"With Friends Like These"	Ariel Lacroix	Miles Luna; Jordan Cwierz	July 7, 2023	4LBF19

=== Season 5 (2024) ===
No. overall	No. in season	Title	Directed by	Written by	Original release date	Prod. code
61	1	"Welcome Back, Campers!"	Eddy Rivas	Eddy Rivas; Kerry Shawcross	March 1, 2024	5LBF01
62	2	"Cloak & Hunt"	Ariel Lacroix	Andrew Rosas	March 8, 2024	5LBF02
63	3	"The Talk"	Ariel Lacroix	Leigh Lahav; Oren Mendez	March 15, 2024	5LBF03
64	4	"Infested"	Ariel Lacroix	Armando Torres	March 22, 2024	5LBF04

== Production and release ==
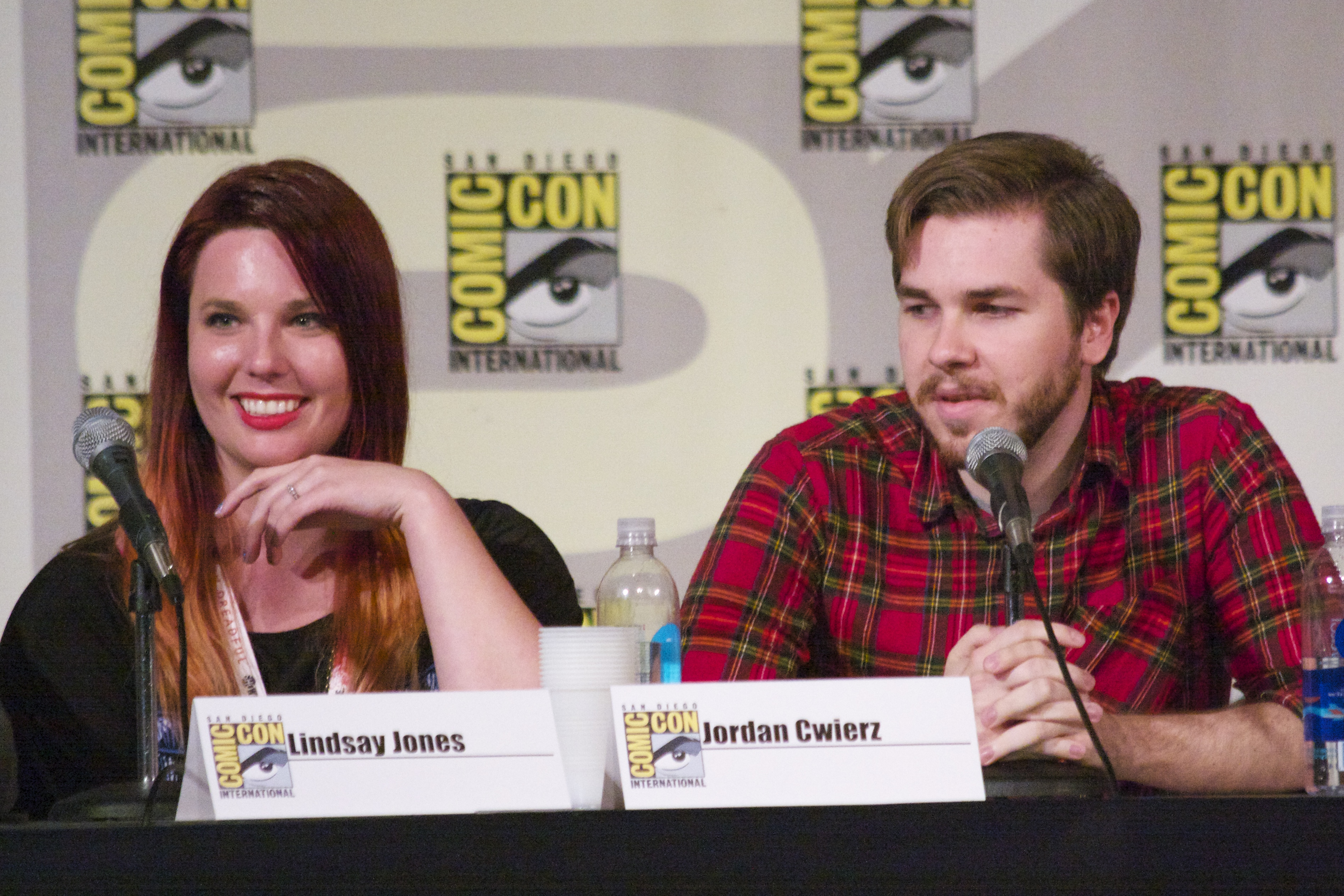
Lindsay Jones, the star of RWBY, with Jordan Cwierz, co-creator of Camp Camp

On April 1, 2016, Rooster Teeth announced Camp Camp with a trailer that aired on their website and YouTube. The series premiered on June 10, 2016, as part of Rooster Teeth's Summer of Animation promotion, airing on Fridays for Rooster Teeth FIRST members and Saturdays for site members. The show was created by Jordan Cwierz and Miles Luna. The first season was extended by two episodes due to positive reception, for a total of 12 episodes in its first season. Camp Camp's composer is Benjamin Zecker, with Miles Luna writing the outlines for "The Camp Camp Theme Song Song" and "Better Than You". A second season premiered on June 9, 2017, with the DVD/Blu-ray combo pack of the first two seasons were released on May 22, 2018, and its third season premiering on May 25. Its fourth season was announced on May 20, 2019, and premiered on the Rooster Teeth website on June 1, 2019. On May 11, 2022, studio and streaming network FilmRise acquired the exclusive streaming rights for Camp Camp for its digital native content division. On July 7, 2023, at Rooster Teeth's annual convention RTX, at which aired a special new episode of Camp Camp, it was announced that Camp Camp would be returning for a fifth season that premiered on March 1, 2024. On March 6, 2024, following the Camp Camp fifth season premiere, Rooster Teeth announced that the company had been shut down by Warner Bros. Discovery, with only four episodes of the fifth season of Camp Camp ultimately being completed, the last of which aired March 22, 2024.

At New York Comic Con 2018, Rooster Teeth indicated potential for a Camp Camp comic book series, following a similar such adaptation of their fellow web series RWBY being published by DC Comics.

== Reception ==
Blasting News described the series as resembling "a lot of other adult cartoons like Archer and Rick and Morty, where the events are so insane that you can't help but love them [which] deliver[s] a surprising amount of heartfelt moments", serving as "an enjoyable experience from start to finish [and providing] plenty of laughs and some charm". Bubbleblabber called the series "a combination between South Park and Gravity Falls [and] of Rooster Teeth's top shows, due to overarching plot lines [and] a history of throwing some emotionally investing episodes into its usually lighthearted series".
