= Mustang Island (film) =

- Directed by: Craig Elrod
- Written by: Craig Elrod; Nathan Smith
- Produced by: Michael Mobley; Michael Bartnett
- Starring: Macon Blair; Lee Eddy; John Merriman
- Release date: April 1, 2017 (Dallas)
- Running time: 86 minutes
- Country: United States
- Language: English

Mustang Island is a 2017 American comedy film written by Craig Elrod and Nathan Smith, directed by Elrod and starring Macon Blair, Lee Eddy and John Merriman.

== Cast ==
- Macon Blair as Bill
- Lee Eddy as Lee
- John Merriman as John
- Molly Karrasch as Molly
- Jason Newman as Travis
- Byron Brown as Byron
- Haley Alea Erickson as Julie

== Release ==
The film was released on April 1, 2017 at the Dallas International Film Festival.

== Reception ==
Chase Whale of Film Threat graded the film a B. Marjorie Baumgarten of The Austin Chronicle awarded the film three stars out of five.
