= David W. Thompson =

American actor

- Born: David William Thompson; July 21, 1994 (age 32); Westchester County, New York, United States
- Occupation: Actor
- Years active: 2010–present
- Height: 6 ft 0 in (183 cm)

David William Thompson (born July 21, 1994) is an American actor. He is best known for starring in the films Win Win (2011), A Christmas Story 2 (2012), Blue Ruin (2013), Green Room (2015), and Fear Street Part One: 1994 (2021). In 2018, Thompson played Jonathan Crane/Scarecrow in the Fox television series Gotham.

== Filmography ==
=== Film ===
| Year | Title | Role | Notes |
|---|---|---|---|
| 2010 | Flagpole | Zach | Short film |
| 2010 | The Return Address | Aaron | Short film |
| 2011 | Win Win | Stemler | |
| 2012 | A Christmas Story 2 | Flick | |
| 2013 | Blue Ruin | William | |
| 2015 | Green Room | Tad | |
| 2017 | Coin Heist | Greg | |
| 2017 | The Outcasts | Debate Nerd | |
| 2017 | Public Speaking | Alex | Short film |
| 2017 | New Money | Chris | |
| 2018 | Love Magical | Donald | |
| 2021 | Fear Street Part One: 1994 | Ryan | |
| 2024 | It's What's Inside | Forbes | |

=== Television ===
| Year | Title | Role | Notes |
|---|---|---|---|
| 2011 | Onion News Network | Kyle Johnson | Episode: "Real America" |
| 2011 | All Night with Joey Reynolds | Himself | Season 1, episode 45 |
| 2011 | How to Make It in America | Teenager #1 | Episode: "I'm Sorry, Who's Yosi?" |
| 2011 | Unforgettable | Skate Punk #2 | Episode: "Spirited Away" |
| 2013 | Fox Shortcoms Comedy Hour | Kyle | Episode: "Pizza Party" |
| 2014 | Boardwalk Empire | Bellboy | Episode: "The Good Listener" |
| 2015 | Unbreakable Kimmy Schmidt | Drum Major | Episode: "Kimmy Makes Waffles!" |
| 2017 | Rhinebrook | Dan | 4 episodes |
| 2018–2019 | Gotham | Jonathan Crane / Scarecrow | 6 episodes |
| 2020 | The Boys | Gecko | 2 episodes |
| 2021 | Panic | Daniel Diggins | 10 episodes |
| 2022 | Station 19 | Ethan | Episode: "Everybody's Got Something to Hide Except Me and My Monkey" |
| 2025 | Watson | Cameron Phipps | Episode: "The Man with the Alien Hand" |
| 2025 | Mountainhead | Leo | Television film |
