= I Don't Feel at Home in This World Anymore =

2017 American comedy thriller film

- Film poster
- Directed by: Macon Blair
- Written by: Macon Blair
- Produced by: Mette-Marie Kongsved; Neil Kopp; Vincent Savino
- Starring: Melanie Lynskey; Elijah Wood; David Yow; Jane Levy; Devon Graye
- Cinematography: Larkin Seiple
- Edited by: Tomas Vengris
- Music by: Brooke Blair; Will Blair
- Production companies: Filmscience; XYZ Films
- Distributed by: Netflix
- Release dates: January 19, 2017 (Sundance); February 24, 2017 (United States)
- Running time: 96 minutes
- Country: United States
- Language: English

I Don't Feel at Home in This World Anymore (often stylized I don't feel at home in this world anymore.) is a 2017 American neo-noir comedy thriller film, written and directed by Macon Blair in his directorial debut. It stars Melanie Lynskey, Elijah Wood, David Yow, Jane Levy, and Devon Graye. The film's title originates from an old gospel song, "Ain't Got No Home", which was popularized by country singers The Carter Family and Woody Guthrie.

The film had its world premiere at the Sundance Film Festival on January 19, 2017, where it went on to win the Grand Jury Prize in the U.S. Dramatic competition. It was released to streaming by Netflix on February 24, 2017, and was roundly praised by critics.

== Plot ==
Nursing assistant Ruth returns home from a bad day at work to find she has been burgled. She reports to the police that the thief has stolen her medication, her grandmother's silverware and a laptop computer. When she asks Detective William Bendix for advice, he merely chastises her for leaving her door unlocked. Ruth asks her neighbors if they saw anything suspicious; one of them, Tony, becomes enraged that someone would target a neighbor. When a mobile app reveals the location of her laptop and the police refuse to do anything, she enlists Tony's help.

Ruth and Tony go to the location, where Ruth intimidates the owner into returning her laptop. He claims that he bought it from a fence who operates a resale shop. Ruth and Tony investigate the shop the next morning, where they find the stolen silverware and a man whose shoe matches a print left in her yard. Ruth gets into a scuffle with the owner when he demands she pay for the stolen silverware, and after he breaks her finger, Tony knocks him unconscious, at which point the two flee.

Tony, having recorded the license plate number on the thief's van, researches it and learns that it is registered to someone named Christian Rumack. Ruth and Tony impersonate cops at the address belonging to the van, where a woman named Meredith lets them inside. She reveals that the owner of the van, her husband Chris, is not the one who uses the van; it is instead her step-son, who was given the van by his father. Chris Senior returns home abruptly with his bodyguard Cesar. Ruth states that she only wants to confront Christian about his behavior, but Chris taunts her for her idealism and kicks them out. As they leave, Ruth steals lawn art from Chris and Meredith. Disillusioned with Ruth's behavior, Tony goes back to his house, leaving Ruth alone.

Christian and his friends, Marshall and Dez, watch from the side, calling off their intended robbery of Chris. They send Christian to confront Ruth about what she knows about them. He surprises her inside her home, and she crushes his windpipe in self-defense. As he staggers into the street, a bus strikes and kills him. Marshall and Dez kidnap Ruth, forcing her to take Christian's place in their heist. Ruth gains them entry into the mansion, where Meredith and Cesar are held at gunpoint and told to summon Chris. A battle ensues, during which Tony comes to Ruth's aid and is badly wounded; Cesar, Chris, and Dez are killed; and Meredith escapes. Ruth and Tony flee into the woods behind the mansion, with Marshall close behind. Ruth hides Tony under some foliage, then attacks Marshall by throwing rocks at him, and his sudden movements cause him to be bitten by a water moccasin. Panicked that she cannot find Tony on her way back, Ruth sees her grandmother's ghost point her in the correct direction.

Grateful that Ruth saved her life, Meredith neglects to identify her as one of the burglars to Bendix. Ruth returns to her daily life with Tony, who survived his wounds.

== Cast ==
- Melanie Lynskey as Ruth Kimke
- Elijah Wood as Tony
- David Yow as Marshall
- Jane Levy as Dez
- Devon Graye as Christian Rumack Jr.
- Christine Woods as Meredith
- Robert Longstreet as Christian Rumack
- Gary Anthony Williams as William Bendix
- Lee Eddy as Angie
- Derek Mears as Donkey
- Jason Manuel Olazabal as Cesar
- Maxwell Hamilton as Smoker
- Matt Orduna as Dan
- Michelle Moreno as Jana Huff
- Jeb Berrier as Gearhead

Writer and director Macon Blair makes a cameo appearance as a man Ruth meets at a bar. Macon Blair's mother, Robin Blair, plays the role of Grandma Sally in the film.

== Production ==
In April 2016, it was announced Melanie Lynskey and Elijah Wood had been cast in the film, with Macon Blair writing and directing. Blair wrote the character of Ruth with Lynskey in mind.

Principal photography began in Portland, Oregon in April 2016.

== Release ==
The film had its world premiere at the Sundance Film Festival on January 19, 2017. It received a worldwide release on February 24, 2017, streaming exclusively on Netflix.

== Reception ==
Film critic Matt Zoller Seitz wrote on RogerEbert.com that "the story is rather slight; the filmmakers pay closer attention to the small details of character interaction than to the fine points of plot," that the film "never escalates beyond a high simmer," and "once we get to the inevitable (if welcome and satisfying) climax, you may start to tally up all the missed opportunities," but noted that "it’s a treat to see her [Lynskey] front-and-center here, carrying an entire movie mainly with her eyes, face and shoulders." A review of the film in The Austin Chronicle reported that it "confidently walks the shuriken edge of laugh-out-loud funny and cringe-inducing violence, and it does so with such a nonchalant self-assurance," and noted that its "microcosm of ennui, indifference, and clumsy violence reflects a number of themes so prevalent in this society."

On review aggregator Rotten Tomatoes, the film holds an approval rating of 89% based on 62 reviews, with an average rating of 7.4/10. The website's critical consensus reads, "I Don't Feel At Home In This World Anymore transcends its unwieldy title to offer timely, intoxicatingly dark observations on gender dynamics and social norms in modern America." On Metacritic, the film has a 75 out of 100 rating, based on 15 reviews, indicating "generally favorable" reviews.

== Accolades ==
Award	Date of ceremony	Category	Recipient(s) and nominee(s)	Result	Ref.
Austin Film Critics Association	January 8, 2018	Best First Film	Macon Blair	Nominated	
Austin Film Critics Association	January 8, 2018	Austin Film Award	Macon Blair	Won	
Gotham Independent Film Awards	November 27, 2017	Best Actress	Melanie Lynskey	Nominated	
Sundance Film Festival	January 28, 2017	Grand Jury Prize: Dramatic	Macon Blair	Won	

Awards
Preceded by The Birth of a Nation	Sundance Grand Jury Prize: U.S. Dramatic; 2017	Most recent
