= Sister Aimee =

- Directed by: Samantha Buck; Marie Schlingmann
- Written by: Samantha Buck; Marie Schlingmann
- Produced by: Bettina Barrow; David Hartstein; Katherine Harper
- Starring: Anna Margaret Hollyman
- Cinematography: Carlos Valdes-Lora
- Edited by: Katie Ennis
- Music by: Graham Reynolds
- Distributed by: 1091 Pictures
- Release date: September 27, 2019
- Running time: 87 minutes
- Country: United States
- Language: English

Sister Aimee is a 2019 American biographical film written and directed by Samantha Buck and Marie Schlingmann and starring Anna Margaret Hollyman as Aimee Semple McPherson. It is a fictionalized account of McPherson's 1926 disappearance.

== Cast ==
- Julie White
- Amy Hargreaves
- Anna Margaret Hollyman
- Andrea Suarez Paz
- Jordan Elsass
- Michael Mosley
- Blake DeLong
- John Merriman
- Macon Blair
- Bill Wise

== Production ==
The film was shot in Texas and New Mexico.

== Release ==
The film was shown at the 2019 Sundance Film Festival and the 2019 South by Southwest Film Festival. It was then released in select theaters on September 27, 2019, and on VOD on October 1, 2019.

== Reception ==
The film has a 67% rating on Rotten Tomatoes. Kate Erbland of IndieWire graded the film a B−. Norman Gidney of Film Threat gave the film seven stars out of ten.

Candice Frederick of TheWrap gave the film a negative review and wrote, "The gendered themes at play here do little to boost the quality of Buck and Schlingmann’s storytelling, which is too tangled to follow at times." Beandrea July of The Hollywood Reporter also gave the film a negative review and wrote, "Buck and Schlingmann have ideas, but they just don’t add up to something impactful here."
