= Best Kept Secret (film) =

- Directed by: Samantha Buck
- Produced by: Danielle Di Giacomo
- Cinematography: Nara Garber
- Edited by: Francisco Bello; Matt Posorske
- Music by: Brian Satz
- Distributed by: Argot Pictures
- Release date: May 4, 2013
- Running time: 85 minutes
- Country: United States
- Language: English

Best Kept Secret is a 2013 American documentary film directed by Samantha Buck and produced by Danielle DiGiacomo. The film aired as part of POV on PBS and focuses on a special education teacher who must find her students a place in the real world as they prepare to leave the public school system.

== Synopsis ==
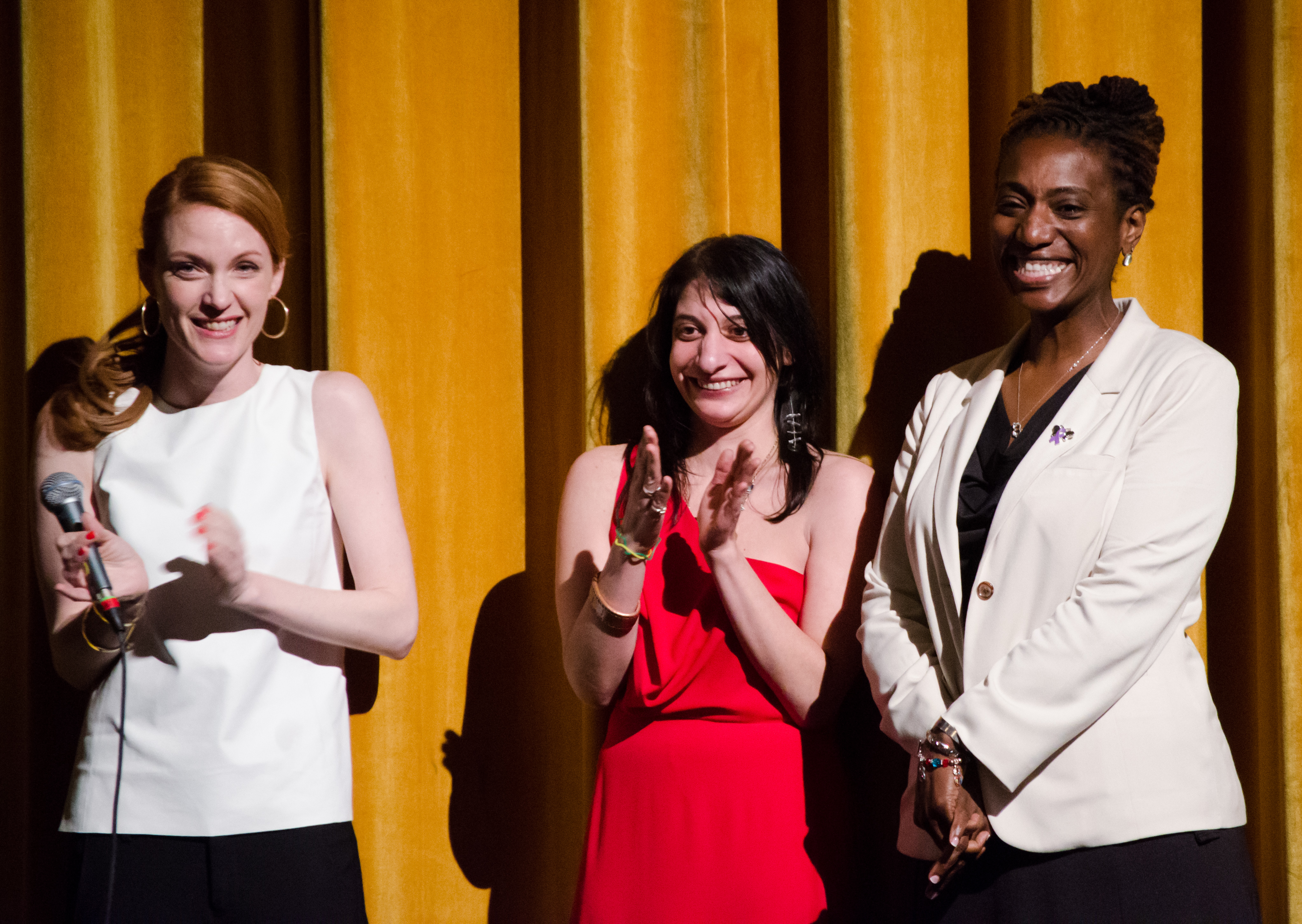
(l-r) Samantha Buck (director), Danielle DiGiacomo (producer), and Janet Mino (primary subject) addressing the audience at the world premiere of Best Kept Secret, at the Boston International Film Festival, April 2013.

The documentary follows one of the classes attending JFK High School in Newark, New Jersey, as they prepare for graduation. In a year and a half, they will graduate from the public school system and go on to their next stage of life. What makes Janet Mino's class different from some others is that she teaches special needs students. Some might find it difficult to move on to things that others without disabilities would find easier to accomplish.

== Production ==
During filming Buck received no interference from the high school's principal and found the school and its staff very accommodating. She chose to use the class's teacher, Mino, as the documentary's storytelling vehicle, as they viewed her as "the thread that pulled all of those stories together". She and DiGiacomo also felt that "The best way to get people to care about a social issue that they might not have a personal relationship with is to get them to be emotionally involved and to care about people so by telling a story where, hopefully, you care deeply about Mino and her amazing experience — she's so expressive and the guys have good personalities and you care about them — I felt like that was the best way to get people emotionally connected."

Best Kept Secret was executive produced by Paul Bernon, Sean Curran, Daniella Kahane, and Scott Mosier.

== Reception ==
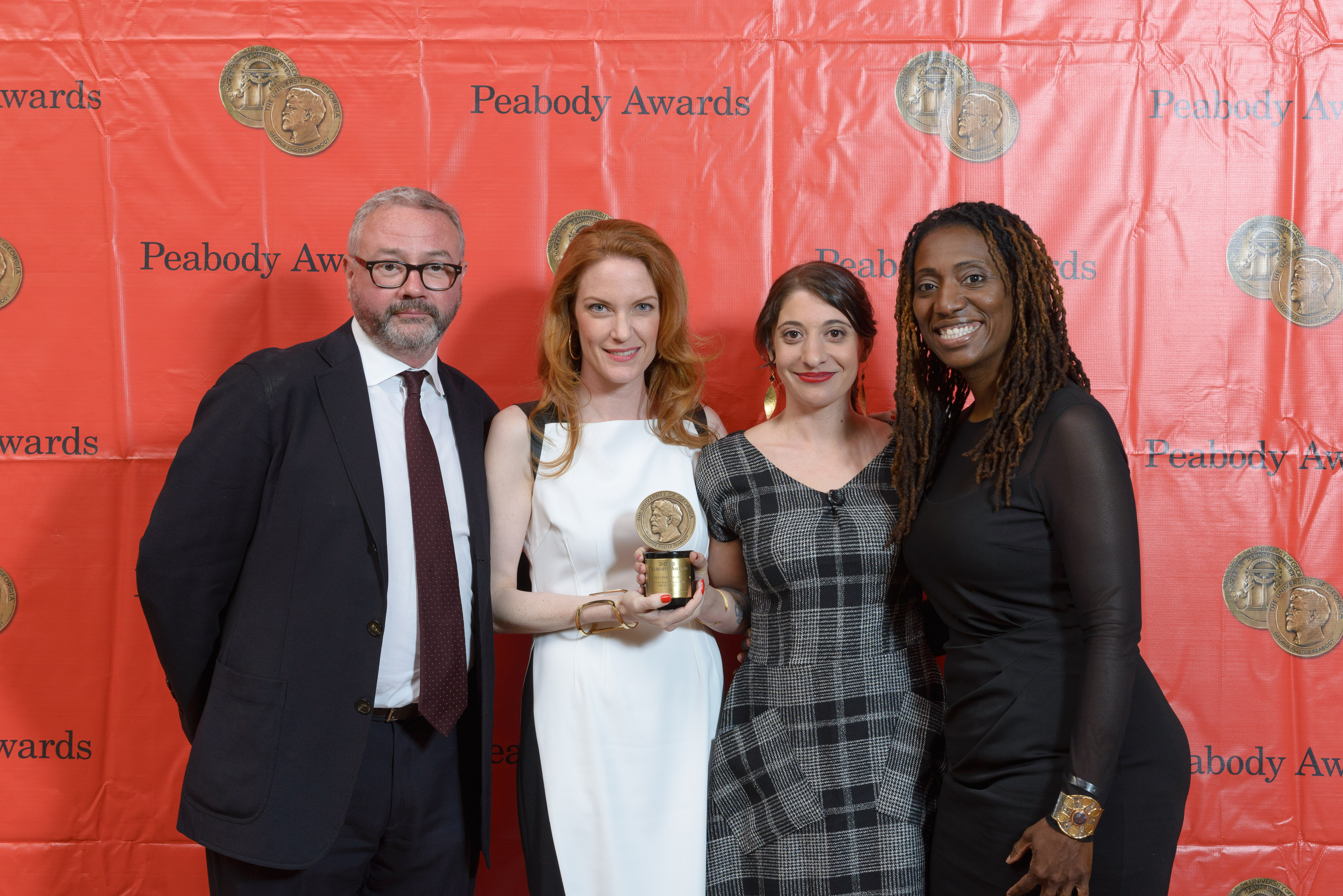
Simon Kilmurry, Samantha Buck, Danielle DiGiacomo and Janet Mino at the 73rd Annual Peabody Awards for POV: Best Kept Secret.

Critical reception for Best Kept Secret has been overwhelmingly positive and the movie holds a rating of 100 on both Rotten Tomatoes (based on 10 reviews) and Metacritic (based on 4 reviews). It was a New York Times Critics Pick. Variety praised the documentary for focusing on minority groups with disabilities such as autism as opposed to "white, middle-class children" and the contrast in the options available to the minority groups. The Los Angeles Times commented that the movie "unfolds with limited on-screen explanatory text and no expert talking heads, inserting the viewer into the overwhelming experience of teaching, parenting, even being an underprivileged young adult with autism." Best Kept Secret was one of five nominees for the Gotham Independent Film Audience Award and the winner of a 2013 Peabody Award.
