= Rebel Ridge =

2024 film by Jeremy Saulnier

- Release poster
- Directed by: Jeremy Saulnier
- Written by: Jeremy Saulnier
- Produced by: Anish Savjani; Neil Kopp; Vincent Savino; Jeremy Saulnier
- Starring: Aaron Pierre; Don Johnson; AnnaSophia Robb; David Denman; Emory Cohen; Steve Zissis; Zsané Jhé; Dana Lee; James Cromwell
- Cinematography: David Gallego
- Edited by: Jeremy Saulnier
- Music by: Brooke Blair; Will Blair
- Production companies: Filmscience; Bonneville Pictures
- Distributed by: Netflix
- Release date: September 6, 2024
- Running time: 131 minutes
- Country: United States
- Language: English

Rebel Ridge is a 2024 American action thriller film written, produced, directed and edited by Jeremy Saulnier. The film stars Aaron Pierre as Terry Richmond, a former Marine; he has the funds needed to post bail for his cousin, but the money is unjustly seized via civil forfeiture by a small town's corrupt police force. Don Johnson, AnnaSophia Robb, David Denman, Emory Cohen, Steve Zissis, Zsané Jhé, Dana Lee, and James Cromwell also appear in the film.

Rebel Ridge was released by Netflix on September 6, 2024 to positive critical reviews. It won the Critics' Choice Television Award for Best Movie Made for Television and the Primetime Emmy Award for Outstanding Television Movie.

== Plot ==
Terry Richmond, a Marine veteran, cycles into Shelby Springs, Louisiana to bail out his cousin Mike Simmons and to buy a work pickup truck. He is rammed by police officers Evan Marston and Steve Lann, who seize his $36,000 in cash via civil forfeiture.

When courthouse clerk Elliot refuses to help, his assistant Summer McBride promises to prepare the paperwork in case Terry can pay Mike's $10,000 bail before his Thursday transfer to state prison as he would be in danger for informing on a gangster. Terry calls his former business partner Liu, who agrees to provide the money.

At the police station, Terry tries to report the cash as stolen to Officer Jessica Sims, and is confronted by Lann and police chief Sandy Burnne. Terry offers to drop the matter if they give him back $10,000 and Burnne agrees to resolve the issue on Monday. Meanwhile, Summer discovers dozens of cases with misdemeanor defendants like Mike being held in jail for exactly 90 days.

On Monday, Terry arrives at the station but Burnne has arranged for the prison bus to leave early. He catches up on his bike and tells Mike to stay safe until he posts bail. Liu can no longer send money after police raided his restaurant at Burnne's request, and Terry returns to the station and is taunted by Burnne. Terry subdues Lann and Burnne, revealing himself as a close quarters combat expert. He forces Sims to open the property room to retrieve the bail money while also noting a large stock of cash and weapons. After forcing Sims to help him escape and posting bail with Summer's help, Terry is captured at the courthouse.

Terry is taken to a hospital by Marston and Burnne, who explains that Mike was stabbed after arriving at prison, and offers the remaining $26,000, paying off the planned truck purchase, and to not pursue charges if he leaves town. Terry accepts, but Mike has died. Summer drives Terry to pick up the truck, and he declines to help her investigate the suspicious cases.

That night, Summer is injected with drugs by the police and calls Terry, who returns to help. At work, she is forced to take a urine test, jeopardizing her child custody. As Terry leaves town, Lann flags him down, throws a gun into his truck as a pretense to open fire, and wounds him in the shoulder. Terry escapes and regroups with Summer at Liu's restaurant, where Liu, a Chinese medic during the Korean War, patches his shoulder.

Summer and Terry interrogate Elliot and the town's judge, who reveal a coverup to avoid transparency measures imposed after a legal settlement nearly bankrupted the town. People are held on misdemeanors without access to public defenders to seek production of their police dashcam arrest footage, which expires after 90 days. Terry and Summer break into the courthouse basement and retrieve the dashcam SD cards as police arrive and start a fire. He escapes, but she is captured trying to destroy her urine sample.

Terry and Lann arrange a swap: Summer for the cards at sunrise. While Lann and a police contingent wait at Rebel Ridge, Terry breaks into the police station using the truck and subdues Burnne. While arming himself with weapons from the property room, Terry recruits Sims, who he believes is Summer's informant in the police department codenamed Serpico, to assist him but she instead detains him as the police return. Lann destroys the cards and reveals that he has injected Summer with drugs and she is at risk of overdosing. Marston protests, revealing himself to be 'Serpico' instead, and is shot in the femoral artery by Burnne. Terry escapes during the chaos and starts fighting back.

Marston tells Terry to activate a police cruiser siren, saving the previous three minutes of dashcam footage, and walks Terry through administering Narcan on Summer. The three flee in the cruiser with police in pursuit. Ordered to perform a PIT maneuver, Sims takes out Burnne's vehicle instead and detains him. The remaining cops escort them to the hospital and report that state police are incoming. Marston and Summer are admitted, while Terry sits and waits with the incriminating dashcam footage.

== Cast ==
- Aaron Pierre as Terry Richmond
- Don Johnson as Chief Sandy Burnne
- AnnaSophia Robb as Summer McBride
- David Denman as Officer Evan Marston
- Emory Cohen as Officer Steve Lann
- Steve Zissis as Elliot
- Zsané Jhé as Officer Jessica Sims
- Dana Lee as Mr. Liu
- James Cromwell as Judge
- CJ LeBlanc as Mike Simmons

== Production ==
In November 2019, John Boyega came on board to star in the film, written and directed by Jeremy Saulnier. In February 2020, Don Johnson, Erin Doherty, James Badge Dale, Zsané Jhé, and James Cromwell were added to the cast. In April 2021, AnnaSophia Robb and Emory Cohen joined, with Robb replacing Doherty.

Filming was slated to begin in April 2020 but was postponed due to the COVID-19 pandemic. Principal photography eventually began in Louisiana on May 3, 2021. In June 2021, Netflix announced that Boyega had left the project during filming due to "family reasons"; filming paused as a result in order to find a replacement for Boyega. It was later reported that Boyega had abandoned the project due to a variety of reasons, including his dissatisfaction with the script and his accommodations, which Boyega denied. In October, Aaron Pierre replaced Boyega. In April 2022, David Denman was added to the cast to replace Badge Dale, before production restarted on April 25. Production wrapped on July 24. In March 2024, Saulnier said the film was in the final stages of post-production.

== Release ==
Rebel Ridge was released on Netflix on September 6, 2024. The film amassed 31.2 million views in its first three days (September 6–9) and 38.6 million more the next week (September 9–15).

== Reception ==
On the review aggregator website Rotten Tomatoes, 95% of 123 critics' reviews are positive, with an average rating of 7.9/10. The website's consensus reads: "An intelligent and gripping vehicle for Aaron Pierre's star-making performance, Rebel Ridge lays down the law on its action-thriller contemporaries." Metacritic, which uses a weighted average, assigned the film a score of 76 out of 100, based on 30 critics, indicating "generally favorable" reviews.

=== Accolades ===
Award	Date of ceremony	Category	Nominee(s)	Result	Ref.
Critics' Choice Television Awards	February 7, 2025	Best Movie Made for Television	Rebel Ridge	Won	
Producers Guild of America Awards	February 8, 2025	Outstanding Producer of Streamed or Televised Motion Pictures	Jeremy Saulnier, Anish Savjani, and Neil Kopp	Nominated	
Writers Guild of America Awards	February 15, 2025	TV & New Media Motion Pictures	Jeremy Saulnier	Nominated	
NAACP Image Awards	February 22, 2025	Outstanding Television Movie, Mini-Series or Special	Rebel Ridge	Nominated	
NAACP Image Awards	February 22, 2025	Outstanding Actor in a Television Movie, Mini-Series or Special	Aaron Pierre	Won	
NAACP Image Awards	February 22, 2025	Outstanding Stunt Ensemble (TV or Film)	Rebel Ridge	Won	
Gotham TV Awards	June 2, 2025	Outstanding Original Film, Broadcast, or Streaming	Jeremy Saulnier, Neil Kopp, Vincent Savino, and Anish Savjani	Nominated	
Gotham TV Awards	June 2, 2025	Outstanding Performance in an Original Film	Aaron Pierre	Won	
Astra TV Awards	June 10, 2025	Best Television Movie	Rebel Ridge	Won	
Astra TV Awards	June 10, 2025	Best Actor in a Limited Series or TV Movie	Aaron Pierre	Nominated	
Astra TV Awards	June 10, 2025	Best Supporting Actress in a Limited Series or TV Movie	AnnaSophia Robb	Nominated	
Astra TV Awards	June 10, 2025	Best Directing in a Limited Series or TV Movie	Jeremy Saulnier	Nominated	
Astra TV Awards	June 10, 2025	Best Writing in a Limited Series or TV Movie	Jeremy Saulnier	Nominated	
Critics' Choice Super Awards	August 7, 2025	Best Action Movie	Rebel Ridge	Nominated	
Critics' Choice Super Awards	August 7, 2025	Best Actor in an Action Movie	Aaron Pierre	Nominated	
Television Critics Association Awards	August 20, 2025	Outstanding Achievement in Movies, Miniseries or Specials	Rebel Ridge	Nominated	
Primetime Creative Arts Emmy Awards	September 6, 2025	Outstanding Television Movie	Daniel J. Heffner, Macon Blair, Louise Lovegrove, Anish Savjani, Neil Kopp, Vincent Savino, and Jeremy Saulnier	Won	
