= Wirey Spindell =

- Directed by: Eric Schaeffer
- Written by: Eric Schaeffer
- Produced by: Dolly Hall; Terence Michael; Lloyd Segan
- Starring: Eric Schaeffer; Eric Mabius; Devin Matthews; Zane Adlum; Callie Thorne; Samantha Buck; John Doman
- Cinematography: Kramer Morgenthau
- Edited by: Mitchel Stanley
- Music by: Amanda Kravat
- Production company: Five Minutes Before the Miracle
- Distributed by: WinStar Cinema
- Release dates: 8 September 1999 (Boston Film Festival); 21 January 2000 (US)
- Running time: 101 minutes
- Country: United States
- Language: English

Wirey Spindell is a 1999 American comedy film directed by Eric Schaeffer. The film stars Schaeffer, Eric Mabius, Devin Matthews, Zane Adlum, Callie Thorne, Samantha Buck and John Doman.

Wirey Spindall premiered at the Boston Film Festival on September 8, 1999, and was released in the US on January 21, 2000. It received negative reviews from critics.

== Cast ==
- Schaeffer as Wirey Spindell
- Eric Mabius as Wirey, age 17
- Devin Matthews as Wirey, Junior High
- Zane Adlum as Wirey, age 8
- Callie Thorne as Tabitha
- Samantha Buck as Samantha
- John Doman as Mr. Spindell
- Peggy Gormley as Mrs. Spindell, Mature
- Jennifer Wiltsie as Mrs. Spindell, Young
- Caroline Strong as Judy
- Don Creech as Mean Teacher
- John Deyle as Principal Dickens
- Bryan Callen as Robby
- Mel Rodriguez as Ernesto
- Stefan Niemczyk as Lapper
- Gerry Rosenthal as Mike Johnson
- Bill Weeden as Bill
- Jim Gaffigan as Announcer #2
- Jenna Stern as Roxanne
- Leanne Whitney as Beth
- Greg Haberny as Niles
- Michelle Hurst as Arlene
- David Healy as Yuppie
- Rutanya Alda as Coach's Wife
- Keri Lynn Pratt as First Date
- Irma St. Paule as Angel Lady

== Release ==
The film premiered at the Boston Film Festival on 8 September 1999.

== Reception ==
On review aggregator Rotten Tomatoes, Wirey Spindell holds an approval rating of 24%, based on 17 reviews.

Variety wrote that it is the "mix of sex and Schaeffer’s decidedly quirky view of life that sells the pic", and that the scenes where Mabius portrays Wirey are "among the best in the film."

Kevin Thomas of the Los Angeles Times wrote that Schaeffer is "discreet and funny" and "inspires his actors to risk everything, as he does on both sides of the camera", with Morgenthau being "as venturesome as Schaeffer himself", and Kravat's score being "equally potent". He concluded that while the film "may be too heady for some tastes", it "can stir you deeply, if you’re open to it."

A. O. Scott of The New York Times called the film "banal, boring and confusing."

Marjorie Baumgarten of The Austin Chronicle wrote that Schaeffer "needs to realize that there are few universals in his stories and way too many specifics, and it takes more than a weird name like Wirey Spindell to make a person really distinctive."
