= Gretchen (film) =

2006 comedy film

- Film poster
- Directed by: Steve Collins
- Produced by: Rajen Savjani; Lars Knudsen
- Cinematography: PJ Raval
- Edited by: Mike Shen
- Production companies: Film Science; Van Hoy/Knudsen Productions
- Distributed by: Film1; Watchmaker Films
- Release date: August 2006 (Locarno)
- Running time: 98 minutes
- Country: United States
- Language: English

Gretchen is a 2006 film directed by Steve Collins, starring Courtney Davis as the title character. The film was Collins' first full-length feature and was based on his short film Gretchen & the Night Danger.

== Plot ==
Gretchen Finkle (Courtney Davis) is a 17-year-old high school student with a romantic obsession over Ricky (John Merriman). Her mother (Becky Ann Baker) becomes so concerned about Gretchen's crush that she sends her daughter to an in-patient emotional therapy clinic.

== Cast ==
- Courtney Davis as Gretchen Finkle
- John Merriman as Ricky Marichino
- Macon Blair as Nick Rangoon
- Becky Ann Baker as Lori Finkle
- Yasmine Kittles as Marla Auschussler
- Stephen Root as Herb
- Peyton Hayslip as Miss Jennings

== Production ==
=== Development ===
Gretchen is a full-length adaptation of Steve Collins' 2004 short film Gretchen & the Night Danger, which won the Jury Award for Competition Shorts at South By Southwest.

== Reception ==
=== Critical response ===
Sky Hirschkron, writing for Stylus Magazine, stated, "Collins is perceptive to Gretchen’s status as a loser; the problem is that he offers nothing to counterbalance it, resulting in a perspective inadvertently as cruel as her tormentors". Film Threat's Don Lewis commented, "Gretchen is a really dry, funny and sad film [...] The bond between Gretchen and her mother is a sweet touch and without it, one might think Collins was cinematically abusing Gretchen just as everyone else does throughout the film."

=== Accolades ===
List of awards and nominations
Award	Category	Nominee	Result
Los Angeles Film Festival	Best Dramatic Feature	Steve Collins	Won
