= You Hurt My Feelings (2011 film) =

American comedy-drama film by Steve Collins

- Directed by: Steve Collins
- Written by: Steve Collins
- Produced by: Anish Savjani; Jonathan Silberberg
- Starring: John Merriman; Courtney Davis; Macon Blair
- Cinematography: Jeremy Saulnier
- Edited by: Steve Collins
- Distributed by: Filmscience
- Release dates: April 2011 (Los Angeles Film Festival); May 4, 2012
- Running time: 97 minutes
- Country: United States
- Language: English

You Hurt My Feelings is a 2011 American comedy-drama film written and directed by Steve Collins and starring John Merriman, Courtney Davis and Macon Blair.

== Cast ==
- John Merriman
- Macon Blair
- Courtney Davis
- Lillian Collins
- Violet Collins

== Release ==
The film was featured at the 2011 LA Film Festival. It was then released at the reRun Gastropub Theater in Dumbo, Brooklyn on May 4, 2012.

== Reception ==
Eric Kohn of IndieWire graded the film an A−. Glenn Heath Jr. of Slant Magazine awarded the film two and a half stars out of five.
