= Blue Ruin =

2013 US thriller film by Jeremy Saulnier

- Theatrical release poster
- Directed by: Jeremy Saulnier
- Written by: Jeremy Saulnier
- Produced by: Tyler Byrne; Richard Peete; Vincent Savino; Alex Orr; Anish Savjani
- Starring: Macon Blair; Devin Ratray; Amy Hargreaves; Kevin Kolack; Eve Plumb; David W. Thompson
- Cinematography: Jeremy Saulnier
- Edited by: Julia Bloch
- Music by: Brooke Blair; Will Blair
- Production companies: FilmScience; Neighborhood Watch Films
- Distributed by: Radius-TWC
- Release dates: May 17, 2013 (Cannes); April 25, 2014 (US)
- Running time: 90 minutes
- Country: United States
- Language: English
- Budget: $420,000
- Box office: $993,313

Blue Ruin is a 2013 American independent Southern Gothic thriller film written and directed by Jeremy Saulnier and starring Macon Blair. Saulnier funded production on the film through a successful Kickstarter campaign, which MTV called "the perfect example of what crowdfunding can accomplish."

The film is named after the derelict blue Pontiac Bonneville which the main character Dwight operates.

Blue Ruin premiered at the Cannes Film Festival as part of the Directors' Fortnight section on May 17, 2013, where it was awarded a prize by FIPRESCI. The film received mostly positive reviews from critics and was nominated for the John Cassavetes Award at the 2015 Independent Spirit Awards.

== Plot summary ==
Vagrant Dwight Evans lives out of his car in Rehoboth Beach, Delaware and scavenges for food and money. After learning of the impending release of Wade Marshall Cleland Jr, the man who murdered Dwight's parents twenty years earlier, Dwight returns to his hometown in Virginia. He goes to a firearms store to buy a gun, but buys a postcard instead and sends it to his sister. He then breaks into a truck and steals a gun, but destroys it trying to open its trigger lock with a crowbar.

Dwight parks outside the prison, watches the Clelands collect Wade in a limousine and follows them. They go to a club to celebrate Wade's release. Dwight follows Wade to the club's restroom and fatally stabs him with a knife he took from the club's kitchen while sneaking into the building. Returning to his car, Dwight uses the knife to slash one of the limousine's tires, but badly cuts his hand open in the process. Upon returning to the Bonneville, Dwight realizes that he does not have the keys, having dropped them while in the club, so Dwight steals the Clelands' limousine. William, a teenage member of the Cleland family, is revealed to still be in the back of the limo. Upon discovering William in the car, Dwight lets him go. William states that Wade did not kill Dwight's parents, before running away.

After cleaning himself up, Dwight visits his sister, Sam, for the first time in years and says that he has killed Wade. As the killing has gone unreported on the news, Dwight surmises that the Clelands have decided to seek revenge without police involvement. Since Dwight's car is registered to Sam's address, she flees her home with her daughters, and Dwight waits in the family house for the Clelands' attack, armed with a pitchfork. Wade's two brothers, Teddy and Carl, arrive in Dwight's car. As Dwight escapes, he hits Teddy with his car and loads him, unconscious, into the back seat. Before he can drive away, Carl shoots Dwight in the thigh with a crossbow.

Dwight goes to a remote area and puts an unconscious Teddy into the trunk and then cuts the arrow and pulls the rest of it out of his leg, losing a lot of blood in the process. After unsuccessfully trying to tend to his wound and ending up at a hospital, Dwight returns to Sam's house to clean up from the attack. He tracks down Ben Gaffney, an old high school friend and veteran, and asks for help. After obtaining a rifle from Ben, Dwight interrogates Teddy at gunpoint on Ben's property. Teddy explains that Wade was not his parents' killer. Dwight's parents were murdered because Dwight's father and Wade Sr.'s wife were having an affair. As revenge, Wade's now-deceased father killed Dwight's father; the death of Dwight's mother was collateral damage, as she happened to be in the car during the ambush. Wade Jr. took the blame so that his father, who had terminal cancer, did not have to die in prison. Teddy gains the upper hand and wrestles the gun away from Dwight but is shot dead by Ben from a concealed position before he can fire. Dwight and Ben put Teddy's body back into the trunk and part ways after Ben resupplies Dwight with food and more weapons. To keep Ben from further involvement, Dwight sabotages his truck by removing the battery.

Dwight goes to the Clelands' house and removes as many firearms as he can from the home. He buries Teddy and waits to ambush the Clelands. He leaves a message on the answering machine informing them of Teddy's death and asks them to leave Sam out of the dispute. Carl Cleland, his older sister, Kris, and their cousin, Hope, return and listen to Dwight's message. When it becomes clear that the Clelands intend to kill Sam and will search for her in Pittsburgh, Dwight fatally shoots Carl. He holds the women at gunpoint while musing out loud about whether he should kill them all. William, entering through another door, shoots Dwight. William refuses Hope's order to murder Dwight, while Dwight disarms William. Dwight realizes that he has been mortally wounded, and tells William to leave with his car. As William leaves, Dwight tells the women that William is his half-brother, a result of their parents' affair. Hope attacks Dwight as Kris reaches for a hidden gun beneath the footrest of a nearby recliner. Kris accidentally kills Hope, and shoots Dwight before he in turn shoots her dead. A despondent William drops his gun en route to Dwight's car, while Dwight dies on the floor, mumbling that the keys are in the car. The next day, the Virginia postcard that Dwight posted days before, informing his sister of the recent events, gets delivered through his sister's mail slot.

== Cast ==
- Macon Blair as Dwight Evans
- Devin Ratray as Ben Gaffney
- Amy Hargreaves as Sam, Dwight's sister
- Kevin Kolack as Teddy Cleland
- Eve Plumb as Kris Cleland
- David W. Thompson as William
- Brent Werzner as Carl Cleland
- Stacy Rock as Hope Cleland
- Sidné Anderson as Officer Eddy

== Production ==
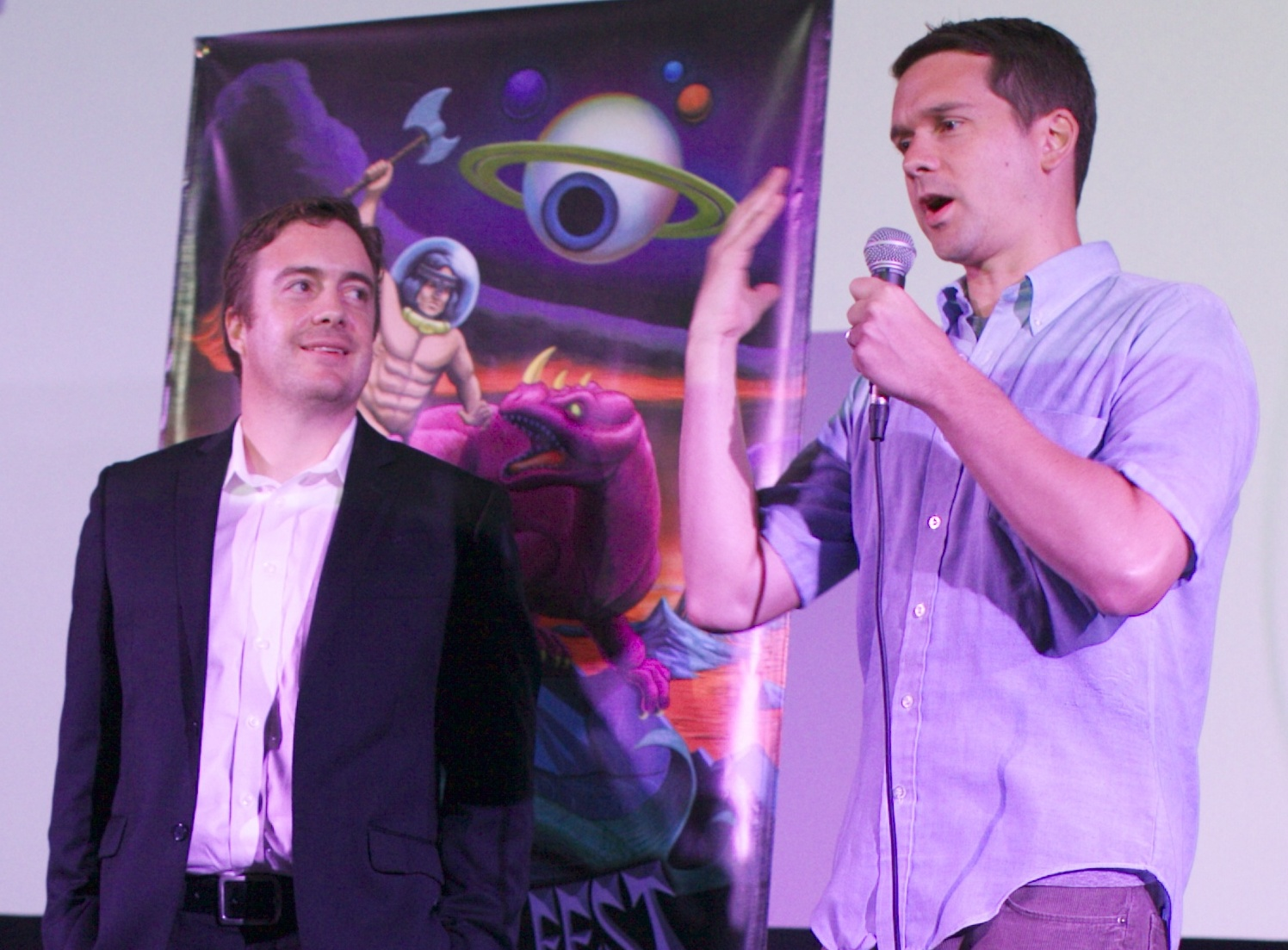
Writer and director Jeremy Saulnier (R) and star Macon Blair (L) at the film's 2013 Fantastic Fest premiere

Blair and Saulnier made movies together growing up and hoped to make a living out of it; however, as they both became older with families, they realized that that might not happen. After the disappointing reception of their horror comedy Murder Party, the two wanted to make one last film together. Saulnier said, "We embraced the fact that we had to wrap up this childhood arc—this insane fantasy of wanting to be filmmakers—and just make a film that was right and true." The concept of a revenge story appealed to Saulnier, who said that it "was just about grounding the film in a very mundane scenario that needed so little exposition." The film's plot also serves as a critique for Saulnier of films that he enjoyed growing up. In particular, several violent crimes in the early years of the 2010s "made [him] miserable", and he said he "couldn't do a film that was akin to those awesome genre spectacles of my youth" in said climate.

The film was financed with help from a successful Kickstarter campaign in 2012 asking for $35,000 and money from Saulnier's own savings. Saulnier initially did not want to use the crowd funding platform, as he felt conflicted about asking for help, specifically that donors could not invest in the back end through the site. However, he eventually realized that the positive outweighed the negative. Saulnier said that when making the pitch video for the campaign "I faced my worst nightmare" as he was camera shy.

== Reception ==
=== Box office ===
Blue Ruin, which received a limited theatrical release, grossed $258,384 in the United States and Canada, and $734,929 in other territories, for a worldwide total of $993,313, against a budget of $420,000.

The film then was given a home video release on July 22, 2014.

=== Critical reception ===
On the review aggregator website Rotten Tomatoes, 96% of 142 critics' reviews are positive, with an average rating of 8.1/10. The website's consensus reads: "Smart, stripped-down, and thrillingly grim, Blue Ruin proves that a well-told revenge story can still leave its audience on the edge of their seat." Metacritic, which uses a weighted average, assigned the film a score of 78 out of 100, based on 33 critics, indicating "generally favorable" reviews.

=== Top ten lists ===
Blue Ruin was listed on many critics' top ten lists for 2014.

- 1st – Chase Whale, Twitch Film
- 1st – Josh Bell, Las Vegas Weekly
- 2nd – William Goss, Austin Chronicle
- 5th – Marc Doyle, Metacritic
- 7th – James Rocchi, The Wrap
- 8th – Russ Fischer, Slash Film
- 8th – A.A. Dowd, The A.V. Club
- 8th – Haleigh Foutch, Collider
- 10th – Nathan Rabin, The Dissolve
