= Murder Party =

- Theatrical film poster
- Directed by: Jeremy Saulnier
- Written by: Jeremy Saulnier
- Produced by: Skei Saulnier; Chris Sharp; Macon Blair
- Starring: Chris Sharp; Sandy Barnett; Macon Blair; Paul Goldblatt; William Lacey; Stacy Rock
- Cinematography: Jeremy Saulnier
- Edited by: Marc Beroza
- Music by: Brooke Blair; Bill Blair
- Distributed by: Magnolia Pictures (US)
- Release date: January 2007 (Slamdance Film Festival)
- Running time: 79 minutes
- Country: United States
- Language: English
- Budget: $190,000-230,000

Murder Party is a 2007 American horror comedy film written, directed and shot by Jeremy Saulnier. It was shot in Brooklyn, New York. It was given the Audience Award for Best Feature at the 2007 Slamdance Film Festival and screened within such festivals as Maryland Film Festival.

== Plot ==
Christopher, a lonely meter maid, finds an invitation to a Halloween costume party entitled "Murder Party", on the street. Constructing a knight costume out of cardboard, he makes his way to Brooklyn to attend the party, only to discover it is actually a trap set by a group of deranged art students. The art students, in costume, include Paul (a gothic vampire), Macon (a werewolf), Sky (a zombie cheerleader), Lexi (Pris from Blade Runner), and Bill (a Baseball Fury from The Warriors). They intend to commit a murder as a piece of artwork to impress Alexander, their wealthy and sinister patron, in the hopes that they will receive a large arts grant from him. Chris has brought along a loaf of pumpkin raisin bread, which Sky starts to eat. She then reveals that she is allergic to non-organic raisins, falls over, hits her head and dies. The group hides the body out of embarrassment.

Alexander arrives to the Murder Party with a friend, Zycho (who is unknown to the group), and his dog, Hellhammer, who is claimed to be part dingo. Alexander reveals that Zycho is his drug dealer. Each member of the Murder Party then gives their input on how they will commit the murder. Drugs and alcohol fuel the group as they decide to wait for the witching hour, at which time they will all stab Chris in unison. While Macon leaves to pick up some pizza, Alexander has sex with Lexi and then later with Paul. Macon arrives back to see the two having sex and begins binge drinking and ends up covering himself in alcohol in the process. He later accidentally sets himself on fire which only Chris notices. Paul, a photography artist, begins taking pictures of Chris and is frustrated that no one will assist him.

As the group grow bored, they decide to play truth or dare using Sodium Pentothal ("truth serum") and divulge their most inner secrets. All eventually take a shot from the same needle, except for Alexander, who injects his shot into a slice of pizza. Each reveals mostly trivial truths about their lives and attempt to force Alexander to confirm that he indeed does have grant money to give. Bill, who has mostly kept to himself, discovers that the group make fun of him and plan on kicking him out, but only because his work is so much better than theirs. Macon confesses his long time love for Lexi and recounts a story of when they were in high school and ate a popsicle together on a water tower. Macon shows he kept the leftover popsicle stick as a token but is rebuffed by Lexi. Chris interjects, revealing that he doesn't care if they kill him as being a meter maid means everyone hates him and has caused him to become depressed. Alexander sends Zycho out to get him some crank.

Frustrated with not having anyone to assist in his photographs, Paul calls his professional assistant to aid him. The group is not happy as the assistant is not aware of the murder party. An argument breaks out and Paul injects Alexander with a dose of truth serum. The group ask him about the grant again and discover Alexander is actually a fraud: He is a fry cook who plans on killing the group, stealing their art and selling it as he assumes it will be worth more. Lexi discovers Macon on fire and she and the assistant extinguish him. Zycho returns with a bag of crank and Alexander immediately tells Zycho to kill everyone. Paul is shot in the head but doesn't realize and seems to only be annoyed that someone interrupted his shot. The assistant is also shot in the head and Zycho attacks Lexi. Macon, badly burned yet still alive, gets his chainsaw and uses it to attack Zycho; brutally killing him and passing out shortly afterward.

Lexi immediately begins to untie Chris, but Bill, who has now completely snapped, decides everyone has to die and kills Lexi with an axe. In the excitement, Hellhammer eats the bag of crank and then attacks Alexander. Bill finishes off the wounded Alexander with a baseball bat and begins hunting down the last survivor, Chris, who has now escaped. Macon awakes and pursues Bill with an electric chainsaw to avenge Lexi.

The chase leads them to an art student party. Chris attempts to hide in a performance art exhibit and Bill is approached by the organizer, Cicero, and asked if he has seen Alexander as a grant was promised to him. Bill is further enraged and vows to murder the whole scene. He enters the art exhibit and murders all the artists before cornering Chris. Macon, who has arrived at the party and has found an outlet to plug in the chainsaw, falls off the roof while plugging it in. The plugged in chainsaw is conveniently left hanging outside a window behind Chris, who, after grabbing it and dodging an axe blow, brings the chainsaw down onto Bill's head in self-defense. Chris then slams a pumpkin onto Bill's destroyed head and screams, "I JUST WANTED TO PARTY!" He exits the room, borrowing a security guard's phone to dial emergency services, explicitly pointing out that the scene is real - not art. He then leaves the exhibit as party-goers assume the murder scene is an art piece.

Chris disposes of his anti-anxiety medication and arrives home, where his cat, Sir Lancelot, finally gives him his chair back. Christopher sits down and turns on his television, still wearing his blood-soaked knight costume.

== Cast ==
- Chris Sharp as Christopher Hawley
- Sandy Barnett as Alexander / Tim
- Macon Blair as Macon
- Paul Goldblatt as Paul
- William Lacey as Bill
- Stacy Rock as Lexi
- Skei Saulnier as Sky
- Bill Tangradi as Zycho
- Puff Snooty as Sir Lancelot
- Beryl Guceri as Paul's Photo Assistant
- Beau Sia as Cicero

== The Lab of Madness ==
The Lab of Madness began with Christopher Sharp, Macon Blair, and Jeremy Saulnier as they were growing up in the 1980s and shooting short horror films on a VHS Camcorder and Super 8. Their first film was made in the 6th grade and was titled Megacop (1986). Later they were joined by Paul Goldblatt, Sandy Barnett, and Bill Lacey. The group would often do school assignments as video projects, so their vast filmography includes interpretations of classical works such as Macbeth and Beowulf. After high school, all went to various film schools and kept in touch.

The Lab of Madness's first attempt at a feature was a screenplay titled Moustache. They shot a short film titled Crabwalk in an attempt to get funding for the film. After failing to find investors, the group decided to greenlight Murder Party with no money in August 2005, and in February 2006 they began shooting.

== Production ==
The shoot was rough with many taking multiple roles on the production. Despite the freezing set, a tight knit crew emerged. Much of the planned special effects had to be compromised due to budget constraints but because of this a lot more focus was put on a few individual effects. Visual effects artist Chris Connelly was brought in to work in post-production on the make up effects to supplement what was done on set.

== Reception ==
The film holds a 100% critic rating on Rotten Tomatoes, based on 6 reviews.
