= Macon Blair =

American filmmaker, writer and actor

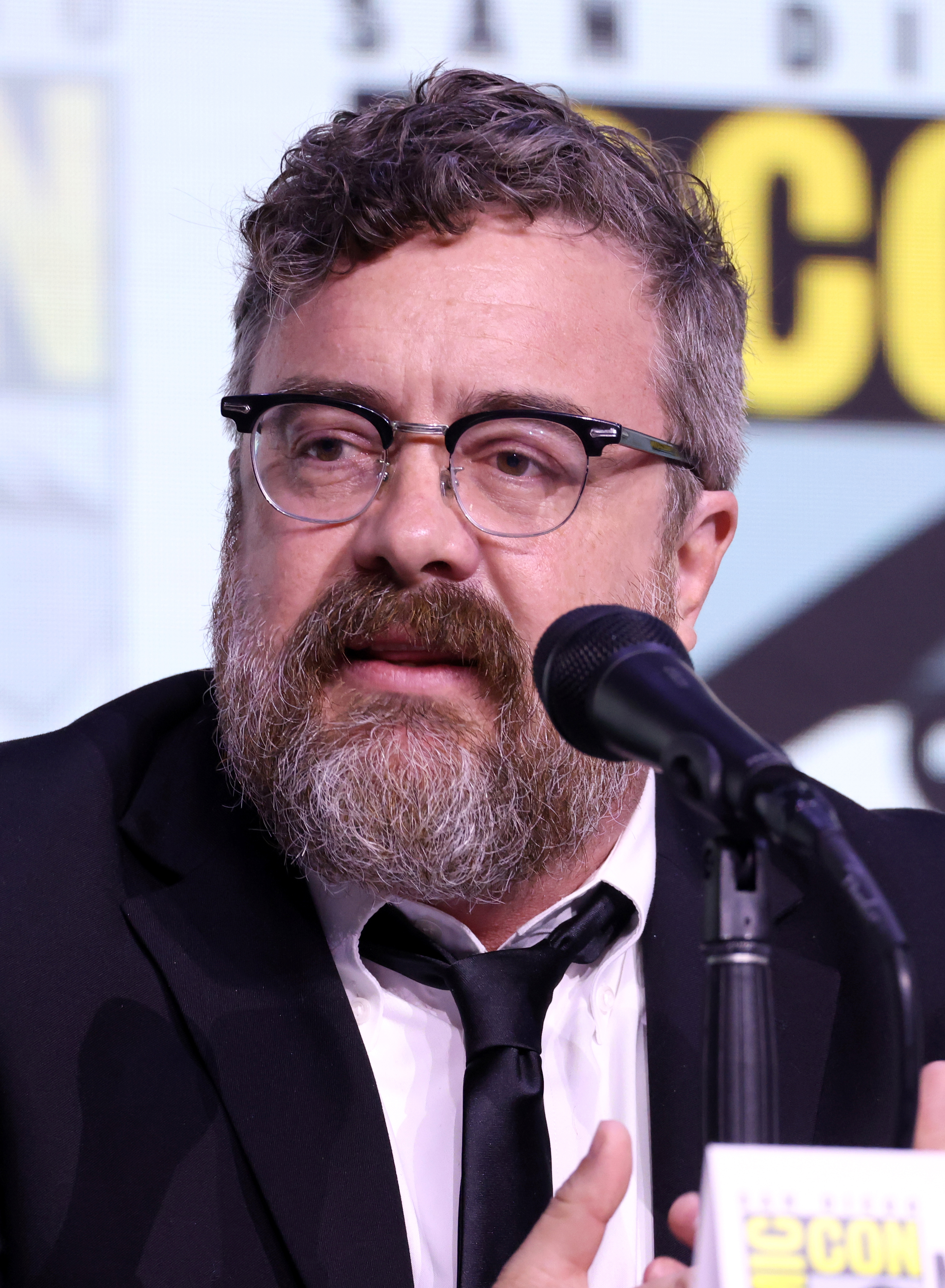
- Blair at the 2025 San Diego Comic-Con
- Born: 1974 (age 51–52); Alexandria, Virginia, U.S.
- Occupations: Actor; director; producer; screenwriter; comic book writer
- Spouse: Lee Eddy
- Children: 2

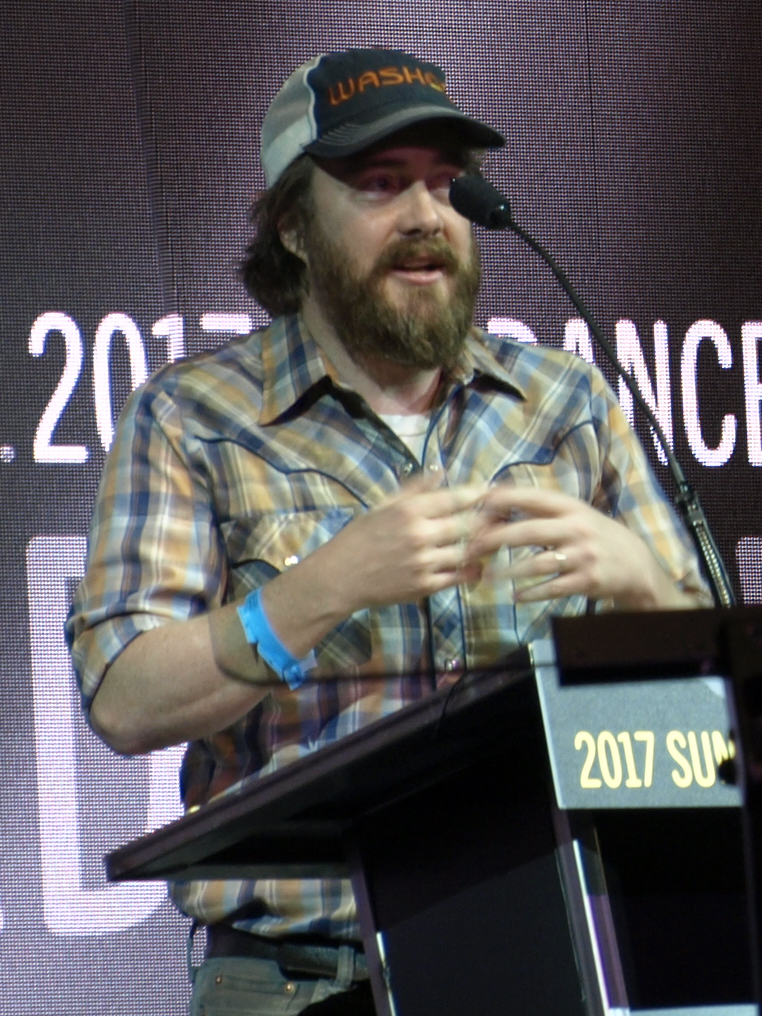
Blair in 2017

Macon Blair (born 1974) is an American filmmaker, comic book writer and actor known for his roles in the films Blue Ruin (2013) and Green Room (2015), as well as his directorial debut I Don't Feel at Home in This World Anymore (2017).

== Life and career ==
Blair was born in Alexandria, Virginia, and began working with his childhood friend Jeremy Saulnier in 2007 on the film Murder Party. In 2013, he played Dwight Evans in the critically acclaimed film Blue Ruin. In 2015, he starred in Saulnier's film Green Room.

Blair co-wrote and starred in the dark comedy Small Crimes starring Nikolaj Coster-Waldau. Blair made his directorial debut on I Don't Feel at Home in This World Anymore. It had its world premiere at the 2017 Sundance Film Festival and won that festival's Grand Jury Prize. It was released on February 24, 2017, by Netflix.

Blair wrote and directed the 2023 The Toxic Avenger reboot for Legendary Pictures.

Blair is also a comic author and created comics for Marvel Comics and Dark Horse Comics. Together with artist Joe Flood, he released the graphic novel Long Road to Liquor City in 2019.

He is married to actress Lee Eddy. Together they have two sons, Buck and Sonny.

== Filmography ==
=== Film ===
| Year | Title | Director | Writer |
|---|---|---|---|
| 2013 | The Monkey's Paw | No | Yes |
| 2017 | I Don't Feel at Home in This World Anymore | Yes | Yes |
| 2017 | Small Crimes | No | Yes |
| 2018 | Hold the Dark | No | Yes |
| 2023 | The Toxic Avenger | Yes | Yes |
| 2023 | 57 Seconds | No | Yes |
| 2024 | Brothers | No | Yes |
| 2026 | Idiots | Yes | Yes |

Producer

| Year | Title | Notes |
|---|---|---|
| 2007 | Murder Party | Executive producer |
| 2011 | You Hurt My Feelings | Assistant producer |
| 2015 | Green Room | Co-producer |
| 2024 | Rebel Ridge | Executive producer |

Acting roles

| Year | Title | Role | Notes |
|---|---|---|---|
| 2007 | Murder Party | Macon | |
| 2011 | You Hurt My Feelings | Macon | |
| 2012 | The Man from Orlando | Glenn | |
| 2012 | Hellbenders | Macon | |
| 2013 | Blue Ruin | Dwight Evans | |
| 2015 | Green Room | Gabe | |
| 2016 | Gold | Connie Wright | |
| 2017 | I Don't Feel at Home in This World Anymore | Bar Dude | |
| 2017 | Small Crimes | Scotty Caldwell | |
| 2017 | The Florida Project | John | |
| 2017 | Logan Lucky | Special Agent Brad Noonan | |
| 2017 | Mustang Island | Bill | |
| 2018 | Thunder Road | Dustin Zahn | |
| 2018 | Hold the Dark | Shan | |
| 2019 | Kindred Spirits | Alex | |
| 2020 | The Hunt | Oliver Fauxnvoy | |
| 2020 | I Care a Lot | Feldstrom | |
| 2023 | Oppenheimer | Lloyd K. Garrison | |
| 2023 | The Toxic Avenger | Dennis | |
| 2023 | Lousy Carter | Dick Anthony | |
| 2024 | The Thicket | Malachi Deasy | |
| 2024 | Rent Free | Paul | |
| 2026 | Idiots | D.D. | |

=== Television ===
| Year | Title | Director | Writer | Notes |
|---|---|---|---|---|
| 2019 | Room 104 | Yes | Yes | Episode "The Plot" |
| 2025 | The Lowdown | Yes | No | 2 episodes |

Acting roles

| Year | Title | Role | Notes |
|---|---|---|---|
| 2008 | Law & Order: Special Victims Unit | Conner Robb | 1 episode |
| 2019 | Swamp Thing | Phantom Stranger | 3 episodes |
| 2021–23 | Reservation Dogs | Rob | 3 episodes |
| 2025 | Mo | Jack | 1 episode |
| 2025–26 | The Lowdown | Dan Kane | Season 1: 4 episodes; Season 2 |
