= The Vampire Diaries Universe =

Fictional TV show universe

- Created by: Kevin Williamson; Julie Plec
- Original work: The Vampire Diaries (2009)
- Owner: Warner Bros. Entertainment
- Years: 2009–2022
- Based on: The Vampire Diaries by L. J. Smith

Print publications
- Novel(s): See below
- Comics: See below

Films and television
- Television series: The Vampire Diaries; The Originals; Legacies
- Web series: The Vampire Diaries: A Darker Truth; The Originals: The Awakening

The Vampire Diaries Universe is an American media franchise and a shared universe that is centered on various interconnected television series airing on the CW. The series were developed by Kevin Williamson and Julie Plec and based on characters who appeared in the original novel series, The Vampire Diaries, by L. J. Smith.

Three television series make up The Vampire Diaries franchise: The Vampire Diaries, The Originals, and Legacies. All series in total amount to 331 episodes across 17 seasons of television.

== Television series ==
Three television series make up The Vampire Diaries franchise: The Vampire Diaries, The Originals, and Legacies. All series in total amount to 331 episodes across 17 seasons of television.

| Series | Season | Episodes | Originally released | | Showrunner(s) | Connection |
| Series | Season | Episodes | First released | Last released | Showrunner(s) | Connection |
|---|---|---|---|---|---|---|
| The Vampire Diaries | 1 | 22 | September 10, 2009 | May 13, 2010 | Kevin Williamson and Julie Plec | Origin series; Introduces characters later seen in The Originals; Introduces characters later seen in Legacies |
| The Vampire Diaries | 2 | 22 | September 9, 2010 | May 12, 2011 | Kevin Williamson and Julie Plec | Origin series; Introduces characters later seen in The Originals; Introduces characters later seen in Legacies |
| The Vampire Diaries | 3 | 22 | September 15, 2011 | May 10, 2012 | Kevin Williamson and Julie Plec | Origin series; Introduces characters later seen in The Originals; Introduces characters later seen in Legacies |
| The Vampire Diaries | 4 | 23 | October 11, 2012 | May 16, 2013 | Kevin Williamson and Julie Plec | Origin series; Introduces characters later seen in The Originals; Introduces characters later seen in Legacies |
| The Vampire Diaries | 5 | 22 | October 3, 2013 | May 15, 2014 | Kevin Williamson and Julie Plec | Origin series; Introduces characters later seen in The Originals; Introduces characters later seen in Legacies |
| The Vampire Diaries | 6 | 22 | October 2, 2014 | May 14, 2015 | Kevin Williamson and Julie Plec | Origin series; Introduces characters later seen in The Originals; Introduces characters later seen in Legacies |
| The Vampire Diaries | 7 | 22 | October 8, 2015 | May 13, 2016 | Kevin Williamson and Julie Plec | Origin series; Introduces characters later seen in The Originals; Introduces characters later seen in Legacies |
| The Vampire Diaries | 8 | 16 | October 21, 2016 | March 10, 2017 | Kevin Williamson and Julie Plec | Origin series; Introduces characters later seen in The Originals; Introduces characters later seen in Legacies |
| The Originals | Pilot | | April 25, 2013 | | Caroline Dries and Julie Plec | Spin-off of The Vampire Diaries; Plotlines from The Vampire Diaries crossover into the series; Introduces characters later seen in Legacies |
| The Originals | 1 | 22 | October 3, 2013 | May 13, 2014 | Julie Plec and Michael Narducci | Spin-off of The Vampire Diaries; Plotlines from The Vampire Diaries crossover into the series; Introduces characters later seen in Legacies |
| The Originals | 2 | 22 | October 6, 2014 | May 11, 2015 | Julie Plec and Michael Narducci | Spin-off of The Vampire Diaries; Plotlines from The Vampire Diaries crossover into the series; Introduces characters later seen in Legacies |
| The Originals | 3 | 22 | October 8, 2015 | May 20, 2016 | Julie Plec and Michael Narducci | Spin-off of The Vampire Diaries; Plotlines from The Vampire Diaries crossover into the series; Introduces characters later seen in Legacies |
| The Originals | 4 | 13 | March 17, 2017 | June 23, 2017 | Julie Plec and Michael Narducci | Spin-off of The Vampire Diaries; Plotlines from The Vampire Diaries crossover into the series; Introduces characters later seen in Legacies |
| The Originals | 5 | 13 | April 18, 2018 | August 1, 2018 | Julie Plec and Jeffrey Lieber | Spin-off of The Vampire Diaries; Plotlines from The Vampire Diaries crossover into the series; Introduces characters later seen in Legacies |
| Legacies | 1 | 16 | October 25, 2018 | March 28, 2019 | Julie Plec | Spin-off of The Originals; Characters from both The Vampire Diaries and The Originals appear in the series; Plotlines from The Vampire Diaries and The Originals continue in this series |
| Legacies | 2 | 16 | October 10, 2019 | March 26, 2020 | Julie Plec and Brett Matthews | Spin-off of The Originals; Characters from both The Vampire Diaries and The Originals appear in the series; Plotlines from The Vampire Diaries and The Originals continue in this series |
| Legacies | 3 | 16 | January 21, 2021 | June 24, 2021 | Julie Plec and Brett Matthews | Spin-off of The Originals; Characters from both The Vampire Diaries and The Originals appear in the series; Plotlines from The Vampire Diaries and The Originals continue in this series |
| Legacies | 4 | 20 | October 14, 2021 | June 16, 2022 | Julie Plec and Brett Matthews | Spin-off of The Originals; Characters from both The Vampire Diaries and The Originals appear in the series; Plotlines from The Vampire Diaries and The Originals continue in this series |

=== The Vampire Diaries (2009–2017) ===
The Vampire Diaries is set in the fictional town of Mystic Falls, Virginia, a town charged with supernatural history since its settlement in the late 18th century. It follows the life of Elena Gilbert, a teenage girl who has just lost both parents in a car accident, as she falls in love with a 162-year-old vampire named Stefan Salvatore. Their relationship becomes increasingly complicated as Stefan's mysterious older brother Damon returns, with a plan to bring back their past love Katherine Pierce, a vampire who looks exactly like Elena.

=== The Originals (2013–2018) ===
The Originals centers on three of the Mikaelson siblings: Klaus, Elijah, and Rebekah. The Mikaelson family are also commonly known as "the Originals" due to the fact that they are the first vampires in history. The series begins with the Original siblings returning to the city of New Orleans for the first time since 1919, where Hayley Marshall, who is pregnant with Klaus's child, has also settled. In their absence, Klaus's former protégé and Rebekah's former lover, Marcel, took charge of the French Quarter. Klaus resolves that they must take down Marcel and get back the city that once belonged to them.

=== Legacies (2018–2022) ===
Legacies follows Hope Mikaelson, the daughter of Klaus Mikaelson and Hayley Marshall, who is descended from some of the most powerful vampire, werewolf, and witch bloodlines. Two years after the events of The Originals, 17-year-old Hope attends the Salvatore School for the Young and Gifted. The school provides a haven where supernatural beings can learn to control their abilities and impulses.

The initial cast of Legacies from left to right: Matt Davis, Quincy Fouse, Peyton Alex Smith, Danielle Rose Russell, Kaylee Bryant, Jenny Boyd, and Aria Shahghasemi

== Development ==
Initially, Kevin Williamson had little interest in developing the series, finding the premise too similar to Stephenie Meyer's successful novels, Twilight. However, at the urging of Julie Plec, he began to read the books. He started to become intrigued by the story: "I began to realize that it was a story about a small town, about that town's underbelly and about what lurks under the surface." Williamson has stated the town's story will be the main focus of the series rather than high school.

On February 6, 2009, Variety announced that the CW had green-lit the pilot for The Vampire Diaries with Williamson and Julie Plec set as the head writers and executive producers. On May 19, 2009, the series was officially ordered for the 2009–2010 season.

The pilot episode was filmed in Vancouver, British Columbia. However, the rest of the seasons have been filmed in Covington, Georgia (which doubles as the show's fictional small town of Mystic Falls, Virginia) and various other communities around Greater Atlanta to take advantage of local tax incentives. On the morning of May 10, 2012, a fire broke out in the building on Clark Street in Covington that was used as the setting for Mystic Grill on the show.

The series was given a full 22-episode order on October 21, 2009, after strong ratings for the first half of the season. Now there is a spin-off called The Originals, that goes into depth about the original vampire family from The Vampire Diaries.

On February 16, 2010, the CW announced that it had renewed the show for a second season, which premiered on September 9, 2010. Early in production, producers tried to get Sarah Michelle Gellar, who played Buffy on the popular supernatural drama series, Buffy the Vampire Slayer, to guest-star on the second season in the role of Rose; however, Gellar declined the role.

On April 26, 2011, the CW renewed the show for a third season. The third season premiered on September 15, 2011.

Former CW president of entertainment Dawn Ostroff mentioned a spin-off idea in 2010 that she said could happen in a few years. A spin-off was in development for the 2011 fall line-up, but due to Kevin Williamson's commitment to The Secret Circle, it was put on hold indefinitely.

The fourth season premiered on October 11, 2012. the CW renewed the show for a fifth season on February 11, 2013.

On April 26, 2013, the CW announced that The Originals had been ordered to the series premiere in the 2013–14 television season. The Originals premiered on October 3, 2013.

Daniel Gillies as Elijah, Claire Holt as Rebekah, and Phoebe Tonkin as Hayley continued to play their characters, originally from The Vampire Diaries, in the new spin-off series.

The Originals is about the Mikaelson siblings, who are the original family of vampires, and their take-over of the French Quarter of New Orleans. The show also involves Hayley and Klaus's daughter, Hope.

Producers reported that there would be a transition of the characters in both series. Claire Holt made a special cameo in The Vampire Diaries, in the episodes "I Know What You Did Last Summer" and "500 Years of Solitude". Michael Trevino made a special cameo on episodes of The Originals, "Bloodletting" and "The River in Reverse." Joseph Morgan, Daniel Gillies, and Claire Holt returned to The Vampire Diaries in a special cameo on the series' 100th episode "500 Years of Solitude". Nina Dobrev also appeared in the fifth episode of The Originals' second season, "Red Door," as Tatia.

At the Television Critics Association winter 2016 press tour, CW president Mark Pedowitz announced an official crossover between The Vampire Diaries and The Originals, where Stefan goes on the run and finds a haven in New Orleans where he runs into Klaus.

In November 2014, a web series titled The Originals: The Awakening was released as the third show in the franchise. The series explores the character Kol Mikaelson and his relationships with his siblings. Flashing back to 1914, Kol is on a quest to ally with the witches of the French Quarter. Awakening gives answers to some questions about Kol's past, including the origins of his rivalry with his family and the unique backstory he has with the New Orleans witches. Each webisode is approximately two minutes long. The series concluded on December 8, 2014. To date, The Originals: The Awakening is the only web series in The Vampire Diaries universe.

CW president Mark Pedowitz said in an interview at the summer TCAs that The Vampire Diaries didn't receive an extra episode order for the second season at the request of Kevin Williamson. Kevin Williamson felt to do the best show possible; he would rather do 22 episodes. "I'd rather have a great 22 than a good 24 if Kevin couldn't do it," he explained. The writers first met for the fifth season on April 15, 2013. Filming began on July 10, 2013, and finished on April 10, 2014. On July 23, 2016, it was announced that the show would end after a 16-episode eighth season.

In August 2017, it was announced that early discussions on the development of a spinoff of The Originals focusing on Hope Mikaelson, the daughter of Klaus Mikaelson and Hayley Marshall, were taking place with Julie Plec, creator of The Originals and co-creator of The Vampire Diaries. In January 2018, it was revealed that a pilot for the spinoff had been ordered; Plec penned the pilot script and is credited with creating the series. It was announced in March 2018 that the spinoff had been ordered to pilot, but instead of a traditional pilot, a fifteen-minute pilot presentation of the series would be presented to the CW.

On May 11, 2018, it was announced that the spinoff, titled Legacies, had been ordered to series for the 2018–19 U.S. television season.

In June 2018, it was announced that the series would premiere on October 25, 2018. On October 8, 2018, the CW announced that they had ordered three additional scripts for the series, bringing the first season total script order to sixteen episodes.

On January 31, 2019, the CW renewed the series for a second season. The second season premiered on October 10, 2019. On January 7, 2020, the series was renewed for a third season.

On February 3, 2021, Legacies was renewed for a fourth season.

With the impending possible sale of the CW in early 2022, Legacies showrunner Julie Plec tweeted that the possible sale had left Legacies' fate hanging in the balance. On May 12, 2022, it was canceled with its remaining episodes left to air.

== Future ==
In February 2020, it was announced that a fourth show in the universe was being developed. In February 2022, Plec tweeted that "there were many more stories to tell" in the TVDU. In May 2022, she reiterated that she hoped to tell many more stories in the universe. In June 2022, executive producer Brett Matthews stated that he believed that "the TVD Universe will likely continue in different forms and fashions over the coming years". He also said that he, Williamson, and Plec were discussing future shows in the universe and that he believes there will "definitely" be more shows in the universe. Plec later stated that the end of Legacies was a farewell to the TVDU, but "only for now, not forever". Plec later confirmed that she, Williamson, and Matthews had an idea for "another chapter" and that the next entry in the franchise was "just a matter of when". Elaborating, Plec said that a fourth show was "coming", but that it was in early stages with "nothing on the page yet" but that she and Matthews were "having a lot of really good, fun conversations about how to launch the franchise into the next phase".

In September 2022, Plec commented saying the writers were planning another series, that both the network and the studio knew about it, and probably would have pitched it within the year 2023, but that the Legacies’ cancellation put the spin-off on hold. The following month, she elaborated on her, Matthews, and Williamson’s fourth series plotline. The series was poised to be set in Atlanta and follow two warring factions - likely brothers. However, Plec stated she is unsure the series could be made yet as she does not know what network it would be picked up by.

== Web series ==
| Series | Season | Episodes | Originally released | | Showrunner(s) |
| Series | Season | Episodes | First released | Last released | Showrunner(s) |
|---|---|---|---|---|---|
| The Vampire Diaries: A Darker Truth | 1 | 4 | August 25, 2009 | September 8, 2009 | Julie Plec & Kevin Williamson |
| The Originals: The Awakening | 1 | 4 | November 10, 2014 | December 8, 2014 | Julie Plec & Carina Adly McKenzie |

=== The Vampire Diaries: A Darker Truth (2009) ===
A promotional web series that follows Jason Harris investigating the strange death of his sister, Jordan Harris. Parody series imitating the style of The Vampire Diaries with excerpts of the original series.

=== The Originals: The Awakening (2014) ===
The series explores the character Kol Mikaelson and his relationships with his siblings. Flashing back to 1914, Kol is on a quest to form an alliance with the witches of the French Quarter. Awakening gives answers to some questions about Kol's past, including the origins of his rivalry with his family and the unique backstory he has with the New Orleans witches.

== Recurring cast and characters ==
List indicators

This section includes characters who will appear or have appeared in at least two series as a member of the principal ("main") cast for at least one of those.

- An empty grey cell indicates the character was not in the series, or that the character's official presence has not yet been confirmed.
- ^{V} indicates a voice-only role.

| Character | Cast member | Television series | | | Web series | |
| Character | Cast member | The Vampire Diaries | The Originals | Legacies | The Vampire Diaries: A Darker Truth | The Originals: The Awakening |
|---|---|---|---|---|---|---|
| Elena Gilbert / Katherine Pierce / Amara Petrova | Nina Dobrev | Main | | | | |
| Tatia Petrova | Nina Dobrev | | Guest | | | |
| Stefan Salvatore | Paul Wesley | Main | Guest | | Main | |
| Damon Salvatore | Ian Somerhalder | Main | | | Guest | |
| Jeremy Gilbert | Steven R. McQueen | Main | | Guest | | |
| Bonnie Bennett | Kat Graham | Main | | | Guest | |
| Caroline Forbes | Candice King | Main | Guest | Guest | | |
| Matt Donovan | Zach Roerig | Main | Guest | Guest | | |
| Vicki Donovan | Kayla Ewell | Main | | | Recurring | |
| Tyler Lockwood | Michael Trevino | Main | Guest | | | |
| Alaric Saltzman | Matt Davis | Main | Guest | Main | | |
| Klaus Mikaelson | Joseph Morgan | Main | Main | Guest | | |
| Elijah Mikaelson | Daniel Gillies | Recurring | Main | | | |
| Rebekah Mikaelson | Claire Holt | Recurring | Main | Guest | | |
| Kol Mikaelson | Nathaniel Buzolic | Recurring | Recurring | Guest | | Main |
| Finn Mikaelson | Casper Zafer | Recurring | Recurring | | | |
| Rayna Cruz | Leslie-Anne Huff | Recurring | Guest | | | |
| Kai Parker | Chris Wood | Recurring | | Guest | | |
| Jo Laughlin | Jodi Lyn O'Keefe | Recurring | | Guest | | |
| Hayley Marshall | Phoebe Tonkin | Recurring | Main | | | |
| Marcel Gerard | Charles Michael Davis | Guest | Main | Guest | | |
| Sophie Deveraux | Daniella Pineda | Guest | Main | | | |
| Camille O'Connell | Leah Pipes | Guest | Main | | | |
| Freya Mikaelson | Riley Voelkel | | Main | Guest | | |
| Mikael Mikaelson | Sebastian Roché | Recurring | Recurring | | | |
| Esther Mikealson | Alice Evans | Recurring | Recurring | | | |
| Aurora de Martel | Rebecca Breeds | | Recurring | Recurring | | |
| Roman Müller | Jedidiah Goodacre | | Recurring | Guest | | |
| Hope Mikaelson | Summer Fontana | | Recurring | Guest | | |
| Hope Mikaelson | Danielle Rose Russell | | Main | Main | | |
| Landon Kirby | Aria Shahghasemi | | Guest | Main | | |
| Josie Saltzman | Lily Rose Mumford | Recurring | | Guest | | |
| Josie Saltzman | Bella Samman | | Guest | Guest | | |
| Josie Saltzman | Kaylee Bryant | | | Main | | |
| Lizzie Saltzman | Tierney Mumford | Recurring | | Guest | | |
| Lizzie Saltzman | Allison Gobuzzi | | Guest | Guest | | |
| Lizzie Saltzman | Jenny Boyd | | | Main | | |
| Dorian Williams | Demetrius Bridges | Recurring | Guest | Recurring | | |

== Expanded setting ==
=== Official crossover events ===
List indicators

- A grey cell indicates the series was not a part of the crossover event.
- The number in parentheses next to the episode title indicates which part of the crossover it is, if not clear otherwise.

| TV season | Crossover title | Episodes | | |
| TV season | Crossover title | The Vampire Diaries | The Originals | Legacies |
|---|---|---|---|---|
| 2015–16 | Moonlight on the Bayou and A Streetcar Named Desire | Season 7, episode 14 "Moonlight on the Bayou" (1) | Season 3, episode 14 "A Streetcar Named Desire" (2) | |
| 2015–16 | Moonlight on the Bayou and A Streetcar Named Desire | Stefan, on the run from the vampire hunter, Rayna, seeks refuge in New Orleans and help from Klaus. While there, he ends up being an ally in their fight against the Strix. | | |
| 2016–17 | Voodoo in My Blood | Characters only | Season 4, episode 8 "Voodoo in My Blood" (1) | |
| 2016–17 | Voodoo in My Blood | Alaric Saltzman runs into the Originals when they come to Mystic Falls seeking an important artifact he has collected. | | |
| 2016–17 | The Feast of All Sinners | Characters only | Season 4, episode 13 "The Feast of All Sinners" (1) | |
| 2016–17 | The Feast of All Sinners | Alaric Saltzman and Hayley meet when she takes her daughter, Hope, to attend the Salvatore School. | | |
| 2017–18 | Where You Left Your Heart | Characters only | Season 5, episode 1 "Where You Left Your Heart" (1) | |
| 2017–18 | Where You Left Your Heart | Caroline Forbes is tasked with tracking down Klaus Mikaelson. | | |
| 2017–18 | What, Will, I, Have, Lefft | Characters only | Season 5, episode 6 "What, Will, I, Have, Left" (1) | |
| 2017–18 | What, Will, I, Have, Lefft | Caroline and Klaus are tasked with finding Hope after she leaves the Salvatore School. | | |
| 2017–18 | The Tale of Two Wolves | Characters only | Season 5, episode 12 "The Tale of Two Wolves" (1) | Legacies backdoor pilot |
| 2017–18 | The Tale of Two Wolves | Caroline and her daughters help Klaus and Elijah with a spell in the backdoor pilot for Legacies. | | |
| 2017–18 | When the Saints Go Marching In | Characters only | Season 5, episode 13 "When the Saints Go Marching In" (1) | |
| 2017–18 | When the Saints Go Marching In | Caroline helps Klaus with one final mission. | | |
| 2018–19 | This Is the Part Where You Run | Characters only | | Season 1, episode 1 "This Is the Part Where You Run" (1) |
| 2018–19 | This Is the Part Where You Run | Sheriff Matt Donovan helps Alaric Saltzman with a crisis. | | |
| 2018–19 | We're Being Punked, Pedro | Characters only | | Season 1, episode 3 "We're Being Punked, Pedro" (1) |
| 2018–19 | We're Being Punked, Pedro | Jeremy Gilbert, a vampire hunter, helps out at the Salvatore School. | | |
| 2018–19 | Hope Is Not the Goal | Characters only | | Season 1, episode 4 "Hope Is Not the Goal" (1) |
| 2018–19 | Hope Is Not the Goal | Matt Donovan investigates a series of strange attacks. | | |
| 2018–19 | Mombie Dearest | Characters only | | Season 1, episode 6 "Mombie Dearest" (1) |
| 2018–19 | Mombie Dearest | Jo Laughlin is resurrected at the Salvatore School. | | |
| 2019–20 | That's Nothing I Had to Remember | | Characters only | Season 2, episode 6 "That's Nothing I Had to Remember" (1) |
| 2019–20 | That's Nothing I Had to Remember | Freya Mikaelson is called to help Josie Saltzman with a dark magic spell. | | |
| 2019–20 | Kai Parker Screwed Us | Characters only | | Season 2, episode 12 "Kai Parker Screwed Us" (1) |
| 2019–20 | Kai Parker Screwed Us | Alaric Saltzman and his daughters, Gemini Twins, are faced with the evil Kai Parker. | | |
| 2019–20 | You Can't Save Them All | Characters only | | Season 2, episode 13 "You Can't Save Them All" (2) |
| 2019–20 | You Can't Save Them All | Alaric Saltzman and his daughters, Gemini Twins, are faced with the evil Kai Parker. | | |
| 2020–21 | Salvatore!: The Musical | Characters only | | Season 3, episode 3 "Salvatore!: The Musical" (2) |
| 2020–21 | Salvatore!: The Musical | Caroline leaves a letter of advice for Lizzie. | | |
| 2020–21 | We All Knew This Day Was Coming | | Characters only | Season 4, episode 3 "We All Knew This Day Was Coming" (2) |
| 2020–21 | We All Knew This Day Was Coming | Freya helps Hope begin her transition. | | |
| 2020–21 | I Thought You'd Be Happier to See Me | | Characters only | Season 4, episode 5 "I Thought You'd Be Happier to See Me" (2) |
| 2020–21 | I Thought You'd Be Happier to See Me | Rebekah Mikaelson visits her niece, Hope, after she goes through a major change to guide her. | | |
| 2021–22 | Everything That Can Be Lost May Also Be Found | | Characters only | Season 4, episode 15 "Everything That Can Be Lost May Also Be Found" (2) |
| 2021–22 | Everything That Can Be Lost May Also Be Found | Hope continues to be swirled in confusion and fighting her humanity, which results in her seeing the people who mean the most to her: Rebekah, Marcel, Kol and Freya, and a The Originals reunion. | | |

Since the expansion of the universe, several characters and plotlines have crossed over into other shows. The Vampire Diaries and The Originals, airing together, often shared plotlines and characters. Legacies, a cultivation of the two, continues plotlines started in the two parent shows and sees the return of several characters.

== Reception ==
=== Ratings ===
| Series | Season | Originally aired | | | | Nielsen ratings | | | |
| Series | Season | First aired | Viewers (in millions) | Last aired | Viewers (in millions) | Average viewers (in millions) | Rank | Avg. 18–49 rating | 18–49 rank |
|---|---|---|---|---|---|---|---|---|---|
| The Vampire Diaries | 1 | September 10, 2009 | 4.91 | May 13, 2010 | 3.47 | 3.60 | 118 | 1.7 | 88 |
| The Vampire Diaries | 2 | September 9, 2010 | 3.36 | May 12, 2011 | 2.86 | 3.17 | 193 | 1.9 | 151 |
| The Vampire Diaries | 3 | September 15, 2011 | 3.10 | May 10, 2012 | 2.53 | 2.91 | 166 | 1.3 | 123 |
| The Vampire Diaries | 4 | October 11, 2012 | 3.18 | May 16, 2013 | 2.24 | 2.97 | 133 | 0.8 | 139 |
| The Vampire Diaries | 5 | October 3, 2013 | 2.59 | May 15, 2014 | 1.61 | 2.68 | 147 | —N/a | 109 |
| The Vampire Diaries | 6 | October 2, 2014 | 1.81 | May 14, 2015 | 1.44 | 1.54 | 160 | 1.1 | 127 |
| The Vampire Diaries | 7 | October 8, 2015 | 1.38 | May 13, 2016 | 1.04 | 1.95 | 141 | 0.8 | 139 |
| The Vampire Diaries | 8 | October 21, 2016 | 0.98 | March 10, 2017 | 1.15 | 1.71 | 140 | 0.8 | 153 |
| The Originals | 1 | October 3, 2013 | 2.21 | May 13, 2014 | 1.76 | 2.61 | 149 | 1.6 | —N/a |
| The Originals | 2 | October 6, 2014 | 1.37 | May 11, 2015 | 1.19 | 2.03 | 136 | 0.9 | 147 |
| The Originals | 3 | October 8, 2015 | 0.89 | May 20, 2016 | 0.85 | 1.96 | 145 | 0.6 | 163 |
| The Originals | 4 | March 17, 2017 | 1.05 | June 23, 2017 | 0.80 | 0.94 | 141 | 0.3 | —N/a |
| The Originals | 5 | April 18, 2018 | 0.97 | August 1, 2018 | 0.86 | 1.89 | 151 | 0.6 | 155 |
| Legacies | 1 | October 25, 2018 | 0.89 | March 28, 2019 | 0.93 | 1.01 | 147 | 0.6 | 147 |
| Legacies | 2 | October 10, 2019 | 0.80 | March 26, 2020 | 0.67 | 0.76 | 121 | 0.5 | 119 |
| Legacies | 3 | January 21, 2021 | 0.69 | June 24, 2021 | 0.57 | 1.01 | 145 | 0.3 | 132 |
| Legacies | 4 | October 14, 2021 | 0.33 | June 16, 2022 | 0.41 | 0.75 | 130 | 0.2 | 117 |

=== Critical response ===
Critical response of The Vampire Diaries Universe series
| Title | Season | Rotten Tomatoes | Metacritic |
|---|---|---|---|
| The Vampire Diaries | 1 | 71% (28 reviews) | 57 (31 reviews) |
| The Vampire Diaries | 2 | 100% (12 reviews) | 78 (5 reviews) |
| The Vampire Diaries | 3 | 90% (10 reviews) | —N/a |
| The Vampire Diaries | 4 | 69% (16 reviews) | —N/a |
| The Vampire Diaries | 5 | 100% (13 reviews) | —N/a |
| The Vampire Diaries | 6 | 81% (16 reviews) | —N/a |
| The Vampire Diaries | 7 | 77% (13 reviews) | —N/a |
| The Vampire Diaries | 8 | 100% (16 reviews) | —N/a |
| The Originals | 1 | 57% (28 reviews) | 52 (16 reviews) |
| The Originals | 2 | 100% (6 reviews) | —N/a |
| The Originals | 3 | 100% (6 reviews) | —N/a |
| The Originals | 4 | 100% (5 reviews) | —N/a |
| The Originals | 5 | 67% (6 reviews) | —N/a |
| Legacies | 1 | 82% (11 reviews) | 59 (5 reviews) |
| Legacies | 2 | 75% (4 reviews) | —N/a |
| Legacies | 3 | 100% (1 review) | —N/a |

== Awards and nominations ==
=== The Vampire Diaries ===
The Vampire Diaries won 7 Teen Choice Awards in 2010 including Choice TV Show: Fantasy/Sci-Fi, Choice TV Actor: Fantasy/Sci-Fi (Paul Wesley), Choice TV Actress: Fantasy/Sci-Fi (Nina Dobrev), Choice TV: Villain (Ian Somerhalder), Choice TV: Breakout Show, Choice TV: Female Breakout Star (Nina Dobrev) and Choice TV: Male Breakout Star (Paul Wesley). Other nominations were Choice Male Hottie (Ian Somerhalder) and Choice TV: Female Scene Stealer (Kat Graham). The show won an award for Favorite New TV Drama at the 2010 People's Choice Awards and received a nomination for Favorite Sci-Fi/Fantasy Show. It was also nominated for a Saturn Award for Best Network TV Series. On November 9, 2010, it received nominations for Favourite Sci-Fi/Fantasy Show and Favourite TV Drama as well as a nomination for Ian Somerhalder in the TV Drama Actor category at the 2011 People's Choice Awards.

In 2011, The Vampire Diaries was nominated for 12 Teen Choice Awards including Choice TV Show: Fantasy/Sci-Fi, Choice TV Actor: Fantasy/Sci-Fi (Paul Wesley), Choice TV Actor: Fantasy/Sci-Fi (Ian Somerhalder), Choice TV Actress: Fantasy/Sci-Fi (Nina Dobrev), Choice TV: Villain (Joseph Morgan), Choice TV: Female Scene Stealer (Kat Graham), Choice TV: Male Scene Stealer (Michael Trevino), Choice Female Hottie (Nina Dobrev), Choice Male Hottie (Ian Somerhalder) and Choice Vampire (Nina Dobrev, Ian Somerhalder, and Paul Wesley).

At the 2012 People's Choice Awards, the show gained four nominations: Best TV Drama, Best Sci-Fi/Fantasy, Drama Actor for Ian Somerhalder, and Drama Actress for Nina Dobrev. While the show and Ian Somerhalder lost out (to another CW show, Supernatural, and Nathan Fillion, respectively), Nina Dobrev won in her category, becoming the first write-in person ever to do so. At the 2012 Teen Choice Awards, the show gained nine nominations: Choice TV Show: Fantasy/Sci-Fi, Choice TV Actor: Fantasy/Sci-Fi (Paul Wesley), Choice TV Actress: Fantasy/Sci-Fi (Nina Dobrev), Choice TV Actor: Fantasy/Sci-Fi (Ian Somerhalder), Choice TV Actress: Fantasy/Sci-Fi (Kat Graham), Choice TV: Villain (Joseph Morgan), Choice TV: Female Scene Stealer (Candice Accola), Choice TV: Male Scene Stealer (Michael Trevino). Also, the Choice Male Hottie (Ian Somerhalder), and won six.

In 2013, The Vampire Diaries was nominated for five People's Choice Awards, including Best Sci-Fi/Fantasy, Drama Actor for Ian Somerhalder, Drama Actress for Nina Dobrev, Drama Actor for Paul Wesley and Favorite TV Fan Following. While the show lost to another CW show, Supernatural; Ellen Pompeo; and Nathan Fillion, respectively. At the 2013 Teen Choice Awards, the show gained eight nominations: Choice TV Show: Fantasy/Sci-Fi, Choice TV Actor: Fantasy/Sci-Fi (Paul Wesley), Choice TV Actress: Fantasy/Sci-Fi (Nina Dobrev), Choice TV Actor: Fantasy/Sci-Fi (Ian Somerhalder), Choice TV Actress: Fantasy/Sci-Fi (Kat Graham), Choice TV: Villain (Joseph Morgan), Choice TV: Female Scene Stealer (Candice Accola), Choice TV: Male Scene Stealer (Steven R. McQueen).

In 2014, The Vampire Diaries was nominated for four People's Choice Awards, including Favorite Sci-Fi/Fantasy Show. Also, the Favorite Sci-Fi/Fantasy TV Actor for Ian Somerhalder in which he won the award, Favorite Sci-Fi/Fantasy TV Actress for Nina Dobrev. Also, the Favorite On-Screen Chemistry (Damon Salvatore & Elena Gilbert) in which they won the award. At the 2014 Teen Choice Awards, the show gained ten nominations: Choice TV Show: Fantasy/Sci-Fi, Choice TV Actor: Fantasy/Sci-Fi (Paul Wesley), Choice TV Actor: Fantasy/Sci-Fi (Ian Somerhalder), Choice TV Actress: Fantasy/Sci-Fi (Nina Dobrev), Choice TV Actress: Fantasy/Sci-Fi (Kat Graham), Choice TV: Villain (Paul Wesley), Choice TV: Female Scene Stealer (Candice Accola), Choice TV: Male Scene Stealer (Michael Trevino), Choice Male Hottie (Ian Somerhalder).

In 2015, The Vampire Diaries was nominated for five People's Choice Awards, including Best Sci-Fi/Fantasy, Drama Actor for Ian Somerhalder, Drama Actor for Paul Wesley, Drama Actress for Nina Dobrev. Also, the Favorite TV Duo (Ian Somerhalder & Nina Dobrev) in which they won the award. At the 2015 Teen Choice Awards, the show gained ten nominations: Choice TV Show: Fantasy/Sci-Fi, Choice TV Actor: Fantasy/Sci-Fi (Paul Wesley), Choice TV Actor: Fantasy/Sci-Fi (Ian Somerhalder), Choice TV: Scene Stealer (Kat Graham), Choice TV Actress: Fantasy/Sci-Fi (Nina Dobrev), Choice TV Actress: Fantasy/Sci-Fi (Candice Accola), Choice TV: Villain (Chris Wood) Choice TV: Chemistry (Kat Graham & Ian Somerhalder), Choice TV: Liplock (Candice King & Paul Wesley), Choice TV: Liplock (Nina Dobrev & Ian Somerhalder).

In 2016, The Vampire Diaries was nominated for two People's Choice Awards, including Best Sci-Fi/Fantasy and Drama Actor for Ian Somerhalder. At the 2016 Teen Choice Awards, the show gained seven nominations: Choice TV Show: Fantasy/Sci-Fi, Choice TV Actor: Fantasy/Sci-Fi (Paul Wesley), Choice TV Actor: Fantasy/Sci-Fi (Ian Somerhalder), Choice TV Actress: Fantasy/Sci-Fi (Kat Graham), Choice TV Actress – Fantasy/Sci-Fi (Candice King), Choice TV: Chemistry (Kat Graham & Ian Somerhalder), Choice TV: Liplock (Candice King & Paul Wesley).

In 2017, The Vampire Diaries was nominated for two People's Choice Awards: Favorite Network TV Sci-Fi/Fantasy and Favorite Sci-Fi/Fantasy TV Actor for Ian Somerhalder. It was also nominated for three Teen Choice Awards: Choice TV Show: Fantasy/Sci-Fi, Choice TV Actor: Fantasy/Sci-Fi (Ian Somerhalder), and Choice TV Actress: Fantasy/Sci-Fi (Kat Graham)(Won)

=== The Originals ===
| Year | Award | Category | Nominee(s) | Result | Refs |
|---|---|---|---|---|---|
| 2014 | Emmy Awards | Outstanding Hairstyling For A Single-Camera Series | Colleen Labaff, Kimberley Spiteri | Nominated | |
| 2014 | People's Choice Awards | Favorite Actor in a New Series | Joseph Morgan | Won | |
| 2014 | People's Choice Awards | Favorite New TV Drama | The Originals | Nominated | |
| 2014 | Teen Choice Awards | Choice TV Actor Fantasy/Sci-Fi | Joseph Morgan | Nominated | |
| 2014 | Teen Choice Awards | Choice TV Actress Fantasy/Sci-Fi | Claire Holt | Nominated | |
| 2015 | Teen Choice Awards | Choice TV Actor Fantasy/Sci-Fi | Joseph Morgan | Nominated | |
| 2016 | Teen Choice Awards | Choice TV: Liplock | Joseph Morgan & Leah Pipes | Nominated | |
| 2016 | Teen Choice Awards | Choice TV Actor Fantasy/Sci-Fi | Joseph Morgan | Nominated | |
| 2017 | Teen Choice Awards | Choice TV Actor Fantasy/Sci-Fi | Joseph Morgan | Nominated | |
| 2018 | American Society of Cinematographers Awards | Outstanding Achievement in Cinematography in Regular Series for Commercial Television | Kurt Jones (Episode: "Bag of Cobras") | Nominated | |
| 2018 | People's Choice Awards | The Sci-Fi/Fantasy Show of 2018 | The Originals | Nominated | |
| 2018 | Teen Choice Awards | Choice Fantasy/Sci-Fi Series | The Originals | Nominated | |
| 2018 | Teen Choice Awards | Choice TV Actor Fantasy/Sci-Fi | Joseph Morgan | Nominated | |

=== Legacies ===
Newcomer Legacies has also continued the tradition of the two parent series, earning several award nominations at the Teen Choice Awards. Particularly, for favorite Sci-Fi or Fantasy Series, and Danielle Rose Russel has been nominated for lead actress.

== Other media ==
=== Comic books ===
On October 31, 2013, DC Comics launched a comic book series based on The Vampire Diaries.

=== Short stories ===
Five short stories based upon The Vampire Diaries were published in 2010 and 2011. The short stories followed the romance of Elena and Matt, Bonnie and Damon, expansion of the lore, and a Christmas special.

=== Based upon The Vampire Diaries ===
Due to the success of the show, a series of novels based on Stefan Salvatore were published from 2010 to 2012, entitled The Vampire Diaries: Stefan's Diaries. They tell Stefan and Damon's past since Katherine's arrival. As they were written during the series broadcast, some things differ, such as the story of the original Vampires.

- The Vampire Diaries. Stefan's Diaries: Origins (November 2, 2010)
- The Vampire Diaries. Stefan's Diaries: Bloodlust (January 4, 2011)
- The Vampire Diaries. Stefan's Diaries: The Craving (March 3, 2011)
- The Vampire Diaries. Stefan's Diaries: The Ripper (November 8, 2011)
- The Vampire Diaries. Stefan's Diaries: The Asylum (January 17, 2012)
- The Vampire Diaries. Stefan's Diaries: The Compelled (March 12, 2012)

=== Based Upon The Originals ===
While The Vampire Diaries primarily had comics released based on the series, The Originals only had a novel series. On January 27, 2015, the first book in a series of novels based on the show was released. The Rise, The Loss, and The Resurrection make up the three novels in The Originals series written by Julie Plec.

== Source material ==
=== Books ===
There are several books that the shows are based on and take lore from. These include the original four books the show was based on, and several future trilogies, such as The Return, The Hunters, and The Salvation.

=== Differences from the shows ===
The original novel series shares only a few concepts and lore with the television series. The novels do follow Elena Gilbert, Damon Salvatore, and Stefan Salvatore. However, they are significantly different from how they appear in the television shows and several character names were altered and their powers changed.

== Other projects ==
=== Untitled The Vampire Diaries companion series ===
At some point in 2011, a companion series to The Vampire Diaries was in development with Kevin Williamson as writer, but it was later placed on hold and never made. The potential series was to be about a group of people who investigate paranormal happenings.

=== Caroline in the City ===
When approached by the CW to make a spin-off, the network's president, Mark Pedowitz, asked the writers to pursue a spin-off about Caroline and Tyler leaving Mystic Falls and following their adventures in another city. However, the writers rejected the idea.
