= Jenny Boyd (actress) =

British actress

- Born: Sion, Switzerland
- Education: London Academy of Music and Dramatic Art
- Occupation: Actress
- Years active: 2015–present
- Spouse: Eden Ormerod (m. 2022)

Jenny Boyd is a British actress. She is known for her role as Lizzie Saltzman in the CW series Legacies (2018–2022).

== Early life ==
Boyd was born in Sion, Switzerland to mother Mary Weld-Forester, an office worker from Newbury, Berkshire, and father Brad Boyd, former mayor of Sisters, Oregon. Boyd holds dual British and American citizenship. Her parents divorced in 1996. She was raised in Sisters and Bend, Oregon where she began appearing in local theatre productions at age five.

After modelling internationally with Elite New York, Boyd went on to graduate from the London Academy of Music and Dramatic Art (LAMDA) with a Bachelor of Arts in Acting. She also took an acting class in Los Angeles, through which she met Vampire Diaries actress Candice King.

== Career ==
Boyd made her television debut as Tasya in the television film Viking Quest with Anya Taylor-Joy. This was followed by her feature film debut as Amber Kelly in Rudolf Buitendach's 2018 horror film Hex. That same year, Boyd began starring as witch Lizzie Saltzman, Josie's (Kaylee Bryant) twin sister and Alaric's (Matthew Davis) daughter, in the CW teen fantasy series Legacies, a spin-off of The Originals (2013–2018) that forms part of The Vampire Diaries Universe. The character had previously been introduced as a small child in The Vampire Diaries and as a tween in The Originals. Boyd played the role for all four seasons of Legacies from 2018 to 2022.

== Personal life ==
In the wake of the COVID-19 pandemic, Boyd moved to Wiltshire. She married Eden Ormerod of Druids Lodge Polo Club in June 2022. After her mother was diagnosed with leukaemia, Boyd did campaigns with Leukaemia Care and Leukaemia UK.

== Filmography ==
Year	Title	Role	Notes
2015	Viking Quest	Tasya	Television film
2016	Clean Sheets	Sonia	Short film
2018	Hex	Amber Kelly	Film
2018	Sunday Tide	Christabel	Short film
2018–2022	Legacies	Lizzie Saltzman	Main role
2026	Royally Screwed	Olivia	
