= List of The Originals episodes =

The Originals is an American supernatural drama television series created by Julie Plec for The CW. A spin-off of The Vampire Diaries, the series makes use of certain characters and story elements from the series of books of the same name. The first season premiered with a special preview on October 3, 2013, following the season premiere of its parent series, before premiering in its regular time slot on October 8, 2013.

The series is set in New Orleans which the Mikaelson family and original vampires helped to build. In the first season, the focus was primarily on Klaus (Joseph Morgan), Elijah (Daniel Gillies), and Rebekah (Claire Holt) who found out in the backdoor pilot, aired on April 25, 2013, how Hayley Marshall (Phoebe Tonkin) was pregnant with Klaus's child, and has now given birth to a werewolf/witch/vampire hybrid named Hope (Summer Fontana). Having fled the city many years ago, they return to find Marcel (Charles Michael Davis) (Klaus's adoptive son) leading the city. The family decide to take back the city. The series also revolves around the relationship between them and other supernatural beings, including witches. In the second season, Kol (played by both Nathaniel Buzolic and Daniel Sharman) and Finn (played by both Yusuf Gatewood and Casper Zafer) come back.

In May 2017, The CW renewed the series for a fifth and final season, which premiered on April 18, 2018, and concluded on August 1, 2018. During the course of the series, 92 episodes of The Originals aired.

== Series overview ==
| Season | Episodes | Originally released | |
| Season | Episodes | First released | Last released |
|---|---|---|---|
| Pilot | | April 25, 2013 | |
| 1 | 22 | October 3, 2013 | May 13, 2014 |
| 2 | 22 | October 6, 2014 | May 11, 2015 |
| 3 | 22 | October 8, 2015 | May 20, 2016 |
| 4 | 13 | March 17, 2017 | June 23, 2017 |
| 5 | 13 | April 18, 2018 | August 1, 2018 |

== Episodes ==
=== Pilot (2013) ===
"No. overall" and "No. in season" for the pilot dictate the airing and location of the episode within the parent series.

| No. overall | No. in season | Title | Directed by | Written by | Original release date | Prod. code | US viewers (millions) |
|---|---|---|---|---|---|---|---|
| 86 | 20 | "The Originals" | Chris Grismer | Julie Plec | April 25, 2013 | 2J6670 | 2.24 |
Following a tip from Katherine Pierce informing him a witch called Jane Anne Deveraux has ties to him, Klaus goes back to New Orleans only to find the protégé he thought dead ruling the city. The city lives under his strict rules, which makes the witches in the city hope to overthrow Marcel. They persuade Klaus to help by using Hayley, a werewolf who is pregnant with his child. Along with his brother, Elijah's, help, they decide to get back the city. Meanwhile, Elijah tries to persuade their sister Rebekah to come home too.

=== Season 1 (2013–14) ===
| No. overall | No. in season | Title | Directed by | Written by | Original release date | Prod. code | US viewers (millions) |
|---|---|---|---|---|---|---|---|
| 1 | 1 | "Always and Forever" | Chris Grismer | Michael Narducci & Julie Plec | October 3, 2013 | 2J7802 | 2.21 |
| 2 | 2 | "House of the Rising Son" | Brad Turner | Diane Ademu-John & Declan de Barra | October 8, 2013 | 2J7801 | 1.92 |
| 3 | 3 | "Tangled Up in Blue" | Chris Grismer | Ashley Lyle & Bart Nickerson | October 15, 2013 | 2J7803 | 2.22 |
| 4 | 4 | "Girl in New Orleans" | Jesse Warn | Michelle Paradise & Michael Narducci | October 22, 2013 | 2J7804 | 2.23 |
| 5 | 5 | "Sinners and Saints" | Chris Grismer | Marguerite MacIntyre & Julie Plec | October 29, 2013 | 2J7805 | 2.05 |
| 6 | 6 | "Fruit of the Poisoned Tree" | Michael Allowitz | Charlie Charbonneau & Diane Ademu-John | November 5, 2013 | 2J7806 | 2.03 |
| 7 | 7 | "Bloodletting" | Jeffrey Hunt | Michael Russo & Michael Narducci | November 12, 2013 | 2J7807 | 2.40 |
| 8 | 8 | "The River in Reverse" | Jesse Warn | Declan de Barra & Julie Plec | November 26, 2013 | 2J7808 | 2.38 |
| 9 | 9 | "Reigning Pain in New Orleans" | Joshua Butler | Ashley Lyle & Bart Nickerson | December 3, 2013 | 2J7809 | 2.33 |
| 10 | 10 | "The Casket Girls" | Jesse Warn | Charlie Charbonneau & Michelle Paradise | January 14, 2014 | 2J7810 | 2.07 |
| 11 | 11 | "Après Moi, Le Déluge" | Leslie Libman | Marguerite MacIntyre & Diane Ademu-John | January 21, 2014 | 2J7811 | 2.51 |
| 12 | 12 | "Dance Back from the Grave" | Rob Hardy | Michael Russo & Michael Narducci | January 28, 2014 | 2J7812 | 2.32 |
| 13 | 13 | "Crescent City" | Chris Grismer | Michael Narducci & Julie Plec | February 4, 2014 | 2J7813 | 2.10 |
| 14 | 14 | "Long Way Back from Hell" | Matt Hastings | Ashley Lyle & Bart Nickerson | February 25, 2014 | 2J7814 | 1.83 |
| 15 | 15 | "Le Grand Guignol" | Chris Grismer | Declan de Barra & Diane Ademu-John | March 4, 2014 | 2J7815 | 1.80 |
| 16 | 16 | "Farewell to Storyville" | Jesse Warn | Michael Narducci | March 11, 2014 | 2J7816 | 1.73 |
| 17 | 17 | "Moon Over Bourbon Street" | Michael Robison | Michelle Paradise & Christopher Hollier | March 18, 2014 | 2J7817 | 1.53 |
| 18 | 18 | "The Big Uneasy" | Leslie Libman | Marguerite MacIntyre & Michael Russo | April 15, 2014 | 2J7818 | 1.52 |
| 19 | 19 | "An Unblinking Death" | Kellie Cyrus | Ashley Lyle & Bart Nickerson | April 22, 2014 | 2J7819 | 1.50 |
| 20 | 20 | "A Closer Walk with Thee" | Sylvain White | Carina Adly MacKenzie & Julie Plec | April 29, 2014 | 2J7820 | 1.77 |
| 21 | 21 | "The Battle of New Orleans" | Jeffrey Hunt | Charlie Charbonneau & Michael Narducci | May 6, 2014 | 2J7821 | 1.44 |
| 22 | 22 | "From a Cradle to a Grave" | Matt Hastings | Diane Ademu-John | May 13, 2014 | 2J7822 | 1.76 |

=== Season 2 (2014–15) ===
| No. overall | No. in season | Title | Directed by | Written by | Original release date | Prod. code | US viewers (millions) |
|---|---|---|---|---|---|---|---|
| 23 | 1 | "Rebirth" | Lance Anderson | Marguerite MacIntyre & Julie Plec | October 6, 2014 | 3J5201 | 1.37 |
| 24 | 2 | "Alive and Kicking" | Jeffrey Hunt | Michelle Paradise & Michael Narducci | October 13, 2014 | 3J5202 | 1.29 |
| 25 | 3 | "Every Mother's Son" | Dermott Downs | Christopher Hollier | October 20, 2014 | 3J5203 | 1.27 |
| 26 | 4 | "Live and Let Die" | Jeffrey Hunt | Ashley Lyle & Bart Nickerson | October 27, 2014 | 3J5204 | 1.31 |
| 27 | 5 | "Red Door" | Michael Robison | Declan de Barra & Diane Ademu-John | November 3, 2014 | 3J5205 | 1.09 |
| 28 | 6 | "Wheel Inside the Wheel" | Matt Hastings | Michael Russo & Michael Narducci | November 10, 2014 | 3J5206 | 1.46 |
| 29 | 7 | "Chasing the Devil's Tail" | Jesse Warn | Carina Adly Mackenzie & Christopher Hollier | November 17, 2014 | 3J5207 | 1.44 |
| 30 | 8 | "The Brothers That Care Forgot" | Michael Allowitz | Charlie Charbonneau & Michelle Paradise | November 24, 2014 | 3J5208 | 1.26 |
| 31 | 9 | "The Map of Moments" | Leslie Libman | Marguerite MacIntyre & Julie Plec | December 8, 2014 | 3J5209 | 1.41 |
| 32 | 10 | "Gonna Set Your Flag on Fire" | Rob Hardy | Ashley Lyle & Bart Nickerson | January 19, 2015 | 3J5210 | 1.52 |
| 33 | 11 | "Brotherhood of the Damned" | Sylvain White | Kyle Arrington & Diane Ademu-John | January 26, 2015 | 3J5212 | 1.74 |
| 34 | 12 | "Sanctuary" | Matt Hastings | Declan de Barra & Michael Narducci | February 2, 2015 | 3J5211 | 1.47 |
| 35 | 13 | "The Devil Is Damned" | Lance Anderson | Christopher Hollier & Julie Plec | February 9, 2015 | 3J5213 | 1.22 |
| 36 | 14 | "I Love You, Goodbye" | Matt Hastings | Carina Adly MacKenzie & Michael Narducci | February 16, 2015 | 3J5214 | 1.44 |
| 37 | 15 | "They All Asked for You" | Chris Grismer | Michelle Paradise | March 9, 2015 | 3J5215 | 1.40 |
| 38 | 16 | "Save My Soul" | Kellie Cyrus | Michael Russo | March 16, 2015 | 3J5216 | 1.25 |
| 39 | 17 | "Exquisite Corpse" | Dermott Downs | Declan de Barra & Diane Ademu-John | April 6, 2015 | 3J5217 | 1.12 |
| 40 | 18 | "Night Has a Thousand Eyes" | Jesse Warn | Ashley Lyle & Bart Nickerson | April 13, 2015 | 3J5218 | 1.01 |
| 41 | 19 | "When the Levee Breaks" | Bethany Rooney | Marguerite MacIntyre | April 20, 2015 | 3J5219 | 1.30 |
| 42 | 20 | "City Beneath the Sea" | Leslie Libman | Carina Adly MacKenzie & Charlie Charbonneau | April 27, 2015 | 3J5220 | 1.20 |
| 43 | 21 | "Fire with Fire" | David Straiton | Michael Narducci | May 4, 2015 | 3J5221 | 1.14 |
| 44 | 22 | "Ashes to Ashes" | Matt Hastings | Christopher Hollier & Diane Ademu-John | May 11, 2015 | 3J5222 | 1.19 |

=== Season 3 (2015–16) ===
| No. overall | No. in season | Title | Directed by | Written by | Original release date | Prod. code | US viewers (millions) |
|---|---|---|---|---|---|---|---|
| 45 | 1 | "For the Next Millennium" | Lance Anderson | Michael Narducci | October 8, 2015 | 3J5601 | 0.89 |
| 46 | 2 | "You Hung the Moon" | Jeffrey Hunt | Carina Adly Mackenzie | October 15, 2015 | 3J5602 | 1.12 |
| 47 | 3 | "I'll See You in Hell or New Orleans" | Michael Grossman | Declan de Barra & Michelle Paradise | October 22, 2015 | 3J5603 | 0.95 |
| 48 | 4 | "A Walk on the Wild Side" | Matt Hastings | Ashley Lyle & Bart Nickerson | October 29, 2015 | 3J5604 | 1.07 |
| 49 | 5 | "The Axeman's Letter" | Michael Allowitz | Michael Russo & Diane Ademu-John | November 5, 2015 | 3J5605 | 0.97 |
| 50 | 6 | "Beautiful Mistake" | Steven DePaul | Kyle Arrington & Christopher Hollier | November 12, 2015 | 3J5606 | 0.98 |
| 51 | 7 | "Out of the Easy" | Bethany Rooney | Beau DeMayo & Michelle Paradise | November 19, 2015 | 3J5607 | 0.80 |
| 52 | 8 | "The Other Girl in New Orleans" | Kellie Cyrus | Michael Russo & Michael Narducci | December 3, 2015 | 3J5608 | 1.17 |
| 53 | 9 | "Savior" | Matt Hastings | Carina Adly MacKenzie & Diane Ademu-John | December 10, 2015 | 3J5609 | 0.97 |
| 54 | 10 | "A Ghost Along the Mississippi" | Michael Grossman | Declan de Barra | January 29, 2016 | 3J5610 | 0.95 |
| 55 | 11 | "Wild at Heart" | John Hyams | Ashley Lyle & Bart Nickerson | February 5, 2016 | 3J5611 | 0.92 |
| 56 | 12 | "Dead Angels" | Darren Genet | Kyle Arrington & Michael Narducci | February 12, 2016 | 3J5612 | 0.80 |
| 57 | 13 | "Heart Shaped Box" | Chris Grismer | Michelle Paradise & Christopher Hollier | February 19, 2016 | 3J5613 | 0.87 |
| 58 | 14 | "A Streetcar Named Desire" | Matt Hastings | Beau DeMayo & Diane Ademu-John | February 26, 2016 | 3J5614 | 1.07 |
| 59 | 15 | "An Old Friend Calls" | Jeffrey Hunt | Carina Adly MacKenzie & Michael Russo | March 4, 2016 | 3J5615 | 0.88 |
| 60 | 16 | "Alone with Everybody" | Hanelle Culpepper | Ashley Lyle & Bart Nickerson | April 1, 2016 | 3J5616 | 0.93 |
| 61 | 17 | "Behind the Black Horizon" | Joseph Morgan | Declan de Barra & Diane Ademu-John | April 8, 2016 | 3J5617 | 0.89 |
| 62 | 18 | "The Devil Comes Here and Sighs" | Jesse Warn | Kyle Arrington & Michelle Paradise | April 15, 2016 | 3J5618 | 0.86 |
| 63 | 19 | "No More Heartbreaks" | Millicent Shelton | Celeste Vasquez & Michael Narducci | April 29, 2016 | 3J5619 | 0.93 |
| 64 | 20 | "Where Nothing Stays Buried" | John Hyams | Carina Adly MacKenzie & Christopher Hollier | May 6, 2016 | 3J5620 | 0.83 |
| 65 | 21 | "Give 'Em Hell, Kid" | Jeffrey Hunt | Ashley Lyle & Bart Nickerson | May 13, 2016 | 3J5621 | 0.79 |
| 66 | 22 | "The Bloody Crown" | Matt Hastings | Beau DeMayo & Diane Ademu-John | May 20, 2016 | 3J5622 | 0.85 |

=== Season 4 (2017) ===
| No. overall | No. in season | Title | Directed by | Written by | Original release date | Prod. code | US viewers (millions) |
|---|---|---|---|---|---|---|---|
| 67 | 1 | "Gather Up the Killers" | Lance Anderson | Michael Russo & Michael Narducci | March 17, 2017 | T27.13351 | 1.05 |
| 68 | 2 | "No Quarter" | Bethany Rooney | Talicia Raggs & Michelle Paradise | March 24, 2017 | T27.13352 | 0.99 |
| 69 | 3 | "Haunter of Ruins" | Jeffrey Hunt | Carina Adly Mackenzie & Declan de Barra | March 31, 2017 | T27.13353 | 0.93 |
| 70 | 4 | "Keepers of the House" | Joseph Morgan | Beau DeMayo & Christopher Hollier | April 7, 2017 | T27.13354 | 1.08 |
| 71 | 5 | "I Hear You Knocking" | Chris Grismer | Kyle Arrington | April 14, 2017 | T27.13355 | 0.87 |
| 72 | 6 | "Bag of Cobras" | Jesse Warn | Michael Russo & Michelle Paradise | April 28, 2017 | T27.13356 | 0.96 |
| 73 | 7 | "High Water and a Devil's Daughter" | Charles Michael Davis | Celeste Vasquez & Carina Adly MacKenzie | May 5, 2017 | T27.13357 | 0.93 |
| 74 | 8 | "Voodoo in My Blood" | John Hyams | Talicia Raggs & Christopher Hollier | May 12, 2017 | T27.13358 | 0.85 |
| 75 | 9 | "Queen Death" | Nicole Rubio | Beau DeMayo | May 19, 2017 | T27.13359 | 0.84 |
| 76 | 10 | "Phantomesque" | Daniel Gillies | K.C. Perry & Kyle Arrington | June 2, 2017 | T27.13360 | 1.03 |
| 77 | 11 | "A Spirit Here That Won't Be Broken" | Hanelle Culpepper | Carina Adly MacKenzie & Michael Russo | June 9, 2017 | T27.13361 | 0.89 |
| 78 | 12 | "Voodoo Child" | Michael Grossman | Michelle Paradise & Christopher Hollier | June 16, 2017 | T27.13362 | 1.01 |
| 79 | 13 | "The Feast of All Sinners" | Bethany Rooney | Michael Narducci | June 23, 2017 | T27.13363 | 0.80 |

=== Season 5 (2018) ===
| No. overall | No. in season | Title | Directed by | Written by | Original release date | Prod. code | US viewers (millions) |
|---|---|---|---|---|---|---|---|
| 80 | 1 | "Where You Left Your Heart" | Lance Anderson | Marguerite MacIntyre | April 18, 2018 | T46.10001 | 0.97 |
| 81 | 2 | "One Wrong Turn on Bourbon" | Carol Banker | Carina Adly MacKenzie | April 25, 2018 | T46.10002 | 1.03 |
| 82 | 3 | "Ne Me Quitte Pas" | Joseph Morgan | K.C. Perry & Michelle Paradise | May 2, 2018 | T46.10003 | 0.90 |
| 83 | 4 | "Between the Devil and the Deep Blue Sea" | Michael Grossman | Beau DeMayo & Kyle Arrington | May 9, 2018 | T46.10004 | 0.76 |
| 84 | 5 | "Don't It Just Break Your Heart" | Jeffrey W. Byrd | Story by : Bianca Sams & Jeffrey Lieber; Teleplay by : Jeffrey Lieber | May 16, 2018 | T46.10005 | 0.80 |
| 85 | 6 | "What, Will, I, Have, Left" | Charles Michael Davis | Marguerite MacIntyre | May 30, 2018 | T46.10006 | 0.82 |
| 86 | 7 | "God's Gonna Trouble the Water" | Carl Seaton | Bianca Sams & Julie Plec | June 6, 2018 | T46.10007 | 0.77 |
| 87 | 8 | "The Kindness of Strangers" | Kellie Cyrus | Beau DeMayo & Carina Adly MacKenzie | June 13, 2018 | T46.10008 | 0.86 |
| 88 | 9 | "We Have Not Long to Love" | Bethany Rooney | K.C. Perry & Michelle Paradise | June 20, 2018 | T46.10009 | 0.77 |
| 89 | 10 | "There in the Disappearing Light" | Daniel Gillies | Eva McKenna & Jeffrey Lieber | July 11, 2018 | T46.10010 | 0.77 |
| 90 | 11 | "'Til the Day I Die" | Geoff Shotz | Kyle Arrington & Marguerite MacIntyre | July 18, 2018 | T46.10011 | 0.68 |
| 91 | 12 | "The Tale of Two Wolves" | Rudy Persico | Carina Adly MacKenzie & Julie Plec | July 25, 2018 | T46.10012 | 0.85 |
| 92 | 13 | "When the Saints Go Marching In" | Lance Anderson | Story by : Julie Plec; Teleplay by : Jeffrey Lieber | August 1, 2018 | T46.10013 | 0.86 |

== Webisodes ==
=== The Originals: The Awakening ===
| No. | Title | Directed by | Written by | Original release date |
|---|---|---|---|---|
| 1 | "The Awakening: Part 1" | Matt Hastings | Carina Adly MacKenzie | November 10, 2014 |
| 2 | "The Awakening: Part 2" | Matt Hastings | Carina Adly MacKenzie | November 17, 2014 |
| 3 | "The Awakening: Part 3" | Matt Hastings | Carina Adly MacKenzie | November 24, 2014 |
| 4 | "The Awakening: Part 4" | Matt Hastings | Carina Adly MacKenzie | December 8, 2014 |

== Ratings ==
The Originals : U.S. viewers per episode (millions)

| Season | Episode number | | | | | | | | | | | | | | | | | | | | | | Average |
| Season | 1 | 2 | 3 | 4 | 5 | 6 | 7 | 8 | 9 | 10 | 11 | 12 | 13 | 14 | 15 | 16 | 17 | 18 | 19 | 20 | 21 | 22 | Average |
|---|---|---|---|---|---|---|---|---|---|---|---|---|---|---|---|---|---|---|---|---|---|---|---|
| 1 | 2.21 | 1.92 | 2.22 | 2.23 | 2.05 | 2.03 | 2.40 | 2.38 | 2.33 | 2.07 | 2.51 | 2.32 | 2.10 | 1.83 | 1.80 | 1.73 | 1.53 | 1.52 | 1.50 | 1.77 | 1.44 | 1.76 | 1.98 |
| 2 | 1.37 | 1.29 | 1.27 | 1.31 | 1.09 | 1.46 | 1.44 | 1.26 | 1.41 | 1.52 | 1.74 | 1.47 | 1.22 | 1.44 | 1.40 | 1.25 | 1.12 | 1.01 | 1.30 | 1.20 | 1.14 | 1.19 | 1.31 |
| 3 | 0.89 | 1.12 | 0.95 | 1.07 | 0.97 | 0.98 | 0.80 | 1.17 | 0.97 | 0.95 | 0.92 | 0.80 | 0.87 | 1.07 | 0.88 | 0.93 | 0.89 | 0.86 | 0.93 | 0.83 | 0.79 | 0.85 | 0.93 |
| 4 | 1.05 | 0.99 | 0.93 | 1.08 | 0.87 | 0.96 | 0.93 | 0.85 | 0.84 | 1.03 | 0.89 | 1.01 | 0.80 | – | | | | | | | | | 0.94 |
| 5 | 0.97 | 1.03 | 0.90 | 0.76 | 0.80 | 0.82 | 0.77 | 0.86 | 0.77 | 0.77 | 0.68 | 0.85 | 0.86 | – | | | | | | | | | 0.83 |

Audience measurement performed by Nielsen Media Research
