= The Originals season 5 =

The Originals
- Season 5
- Promotional poster
- Showrunners: Julie Plec; Jeffrey Lieber
- Starring: Joseph Morgan; Daniel Gillies; Phoebe Tonkin; Charles Michael Davis; Yusuf Gatewood; Riley Voelkel; Danielle Rose Russell; Steven Krueger
- No. of episodes: 13

Release
- Original network: The CW
- Original release: April 18 – August 1, 2018

Season chronology
- ← Previous; Season 4

The Originals, a one-hour American supernatural drama, was renewed for a fifth season by The CW on May 10, 2017. The 2016–17 United States television season debut of The Originals was pushed to midseason, as with the fourth-season premiere. On July 20, 2017, Julie Plec announced via Twitter that the upcoming season would be the series' last. The fifth season consists of 13 episodes and debuted on April 18, 2018. The series finale aired on August 1, 2018.

== Cast ==
=== Main ===
- Joseph Morgan as Klaus Mikaelson
- Daniel Gillies as Elijah Mikaelson
- Phoebe Tonkin as Hayley Marshall (Note: Tonkin is credited as a series regular in episodes 1, 6, 8, and 11–13. In all other episodes, she is not credited and does not appear.)
- Charles Michael Davis as Marcel Gerard
- Yusuf Gatewood as Vincent Griffith
- Riley Voelkel as Freya Mikaelson
- Danielle Rose Russell as Hope Mikaelson
- Steven Krueger as Josh Rosza (Note: Krueger is credited as a series regular from episode 1 to 10. From episode 11 to 13, he is not credited and does not appear.)

=== Recurring ===
- Nathaniel Buzolic as Kol Mikaelson
- Torrance Coombs as Declan O'Connell
- Jedidiah Goodacre as Roman Sienna
- Christina Moses as Keelin
- Alexis Louder as Lisina
- Nadine Lewington as Greta Sienna
- Nicholas Alexander as Henry Benoit
- Shiva Kalaiselvan as Ivy
- Jaime Murray as Antoinette Sienna
- Robert Baker as Emmett

=== Special guest ===
- Claire Holt as Rebekah Mikaelson
- Candice King as Caroline Forbes
- Danielle Campbell as Davina Claire
- Matt Davis as Alaric Saltzman
- Leah Pipes as Cami O'Connell

=== Guest ===
- Demetrius Bridges as Dorian Williams
- Katie Jane Cook as Poppy
- Summer Fontana as young Hope Mikaelson
- Rick Espaillat as Pierre
- Malone Thomas as Colette
- Jason Burkey as David
- Jamie Thomas King as August Muller
- Colin Woodell as Aiden
- Ian Pala as Max
- Jimmy Ray Pickens as Bill
- Allison Gobuzzi as Lizzie Saltzman
- Bella Samman as Josie Saltzman
- Aria Shahghasemi as Landon Kirby
- Nathan Parsons as Jackson Kenner
- Sam Ashby as Connor
- Sebastian Roché as Mikael

== Episodes ==
No. overall	No. in season	Title	Directed by	Written by	Original release date	Prod. code	US viewers (millions)
80	1	"Where You Left Your Heart"	Lance Anderson	Marguerite MacIntyre	April 18, 2018	T46.10001	0.97
In the present (7 years after the events of season 4): Freya and Vincent have become good friends, Hayley is the alpha of the Crescents and Josh is leading the vampires. They meet to plan a festival called Mardi Gras but are interrupted by texts from Marcel, and a phone call from Mystic Falls. Hope has been suspended from the Salvatore School for the Young and Gifted for turning a Crescent wolf, Henry, into a hybrid. Freya is continuing to search for a way to bring the family together. Kol and Davina are married and living in Belize. In New York, Marcel proposes to Rebekah. Elijah is playing the piano in a bar in France, but has no recollection of Klaus when he enters the bar. Each time the siblings come into contact, dark magic occurs. Rumors have spread that Klaus has gone mad, now spending his days killing enemies that may harm his family. Caroline Forbes tracks down Klaus to get him to return to New Orleans to help search for a missing Hayley. Tensions are rising between the factions in New Orleans and Henry kills a popular vampire. The vampires led by Greta storm the compound calling for his death. Klaus is not coping without Elijah, feels Hope is better off without him, and Rebekah realises that Elijah is lost to them. Marcel returns to New Orleans.
81	2	"One Wrong Turn on Bourbon"	Carol Banker	Carina Adly MacKenzie	April 25, 2018	T46.10002	1.03
Hope has a flashback recalling the reason Klaus has ceased contact with her, however it hurts her very much. Roman, a friend of Hope's from the school, comes to Hope to chat about Henry. Klaus attacks Declan, believing that he should have protected Hayley, and Hope intervenes. Vincent visits a seer called Ivy for guidance. Marcel offers Henry a chance for the future after he faces punishment. Hope reveals to Roman who she really is. He flees when Klaus returns. Hope confesses to Klaus that she is responsible for Hayley's disappearance and that she did it to bring Klaus back. Josh warns Marcel, and Ivy warns Vincent, that Hope will be their downfall. When Klaus and Freya arrive to find Hayley, they find her coffin destroyed and bloodied. Someone frees Henry from his punishment and kills him.
82	3	"Ne Me Quitte Pas"	Joseph Morgan	K.C. Perry & Michelle Paradise	May 2, 2018	T46.10003	0.90
7 years ago: Elijah has left New Orleans and has no idea that he is a vampire. He meets Antoinette in New York and she takes him under her wing. Marcel finds Elijah and tells him to leave the city. Elijah hunts for Marcel to discover his true identity. Afterwards, he goes to France to find Antoinette. In the present: Elijah and Antoinette are still together and playing piano in a bar. He proposes to her and she accepts. Klaus confronts Antoinette and compels her to leave Elijah. She has been taking vervain and tells Elijah the truth about Klaus. Klaus tells Elijah who he really is and asks him to return to New Orleans, but Elijah repels him, breaking Klaus' heart. He works out that Antoinette has known who he was all along but he still wishes to marry her.
83	4	"Between the Devil and the Deep Blue Sea"	Michael Grossman	Beau DeMayo & Kyle Arrington	May 9, 2018	T46.10004	0.76
Klaus confronts each faction and threatens them over Hayley's disappearance. Freya visits Hope, who is back in school, to find that she has been searching for Hayley herself. Klaus and Marcel act on a tip-off, but Hayley is gone once again. Angry, Klaus kidnaps a member of each faction and threatens to kill them if Hayley isn't found. Klaus informs Marcel that Elijah is gone. Hayley's crescent birthmark is sent to Klaus, and he flies into a rage and kills two of his hostages. Vincent intervenes before he kills Josh as well. With Klaus now bound, he and Marcel determine that vampires are behind Hayley's disappearance. Greta continues to resist Marcel's leadership, and Hope shares her fears with Roman. As each funeral is held for those Klaus has killed, they declare war on him.
84	5	"Don't It Just Break Your Heart"	Jeffrey W. Byrd	Story by : Bianca Sams & Jeffrey Lieber; Teleplay by : Jeffrey Lieber	May 16, 2018	T46.10005	0.80
Marcel and Klaus stampede the vampire's household, killing everyone, except Greta, who admits to being the one who kidnapped Hayley. As they bleed her of vervain, she confesses that her husband was killed by Klaus and that Hayley will be delivered to them safely if Hope undergoes the same spell Klaus did to suppress his werewolf side. Marcel contacts Freya, who attempts the spell reluctantly, but Klaus stops it. In France, Antoinette tells Elijah that she had met him before their encounter in New York. Their relationship is strained as Antoinette talks about her father, Auguste, a vampire zealot who slaughtered werewolves, an artist who Elijah and Klaus had threatened in the 1930s. During that time, Klaus ultimately murdered Auguste along with his villagers, claiming that anyone who could pick up a coin laying next to his body would be shown mercy. Auguste's wife scrambles out of their house and picks up the coin, begging Klaus to show mercy on her, her daughter, and her son – respectively Greta, Antoinette, and Roman. In the present, Roman and Hope sneak out of the Salvatore School.
85	6	"What, Will, I, Have, Left"	Charles Michael Davis	Marguerite MacIntyre	May 30, 2018	T46.10006	0.82
With the two of them being cloaked, Roman eventually leads Hope to Hayley where he chains up Hope and defends his mother's action. Caroline and Klaus also team up to search for her, and on the way reflect on their past. Meanwhile, Freya and Vincent argue about whether they should tell Declan about Hayley's life, with Vincent being afraid of Declan suffering the same fate as Cami. Vincent keeps quiet after seeing that Declan is related to Cami. Greta visits Antoinette where she convinces Elijah to try to stop Klaus from killing Roman. Hayley eventually agrees to having her werewolf side suppressed, which will cause a beacon so Freya and Vincent can track her. Greta, Elijah, Klaus, and Caroline arrive. Caroline is quickly subdued, Hope ends up passing out from Greta, and Roman stands by and watches as Greta and Hayley duel. Elijah and Klaus fight, eventually taking it inside the house. Hayley sacrifices herself to kill Greta and save Klaus and Hope.
86	7	"God's Gonna Trouble the Water"	Carl Seaton	Bianca Sams & Julie Plec	June 6, 2018	T46.10007	0.77
Elijah and Antoinette visit the army Greta has created. There, Klaus shows up, bites Antoinette and imprisons them both. When Elijah spots her wound, he decides to make an offer to Klaus: Elijah will restore his memory if Klaus gives Antoinette his blood. When Klaus refuses, Elijah asks Marcel and Vincent, who agree. They conduct the spell which ends up failing. Keelin and Freya reunite in the wake of Hayley's death. Meanwhile, Hope struggles with her mother's death, blaming herself. Klaus tries to comfort her, via astral projection done by Ivy, but Hope ends up pushing him away. Ivy manages to convince him to stay away from Hope, noting predictions of natural disasters made by a seer in the 1700s, which have all come true. The prediction states that if all of the disasters occur, all of the firstborns in New Orleans will die. Eventually, Hayley's funeral occurs, with another prediction happening. Klaus briefly stays with Hope before running off to prevent her from harm. On his path, he ends up trapped in a spell that transports him back to the Mikaelson residence where Elijah is also trapped.
87	8	"The Kindness of Strangers"	Kellie Cyrus	Beau DeMayo & Carina Adly MacKenzie	June 13, 2018	T46.10008	0.86
All of the Mikaelson siblings end up trapped in the Chambre de Chasse as well as Marcel. It is there that they find out they are trapped in a spell with representational magic, each one of them having to find a key to unlock a door. Marcel tells them that Hope is planning to draw The Hollow out of all of their bodies. Kol and Marcel then discover a room that had been gone for over a century, meaning Hope could not have known about its existence. They deduce that it was Freya who cast the spell. She ends up vanishing after advising Klaus to let Hope do the spell. Everyone ends up unlocking the door only to enter Elijah's consciousness. There, everyone escapes and Elijah retains his memories, leaving him guilt-ridden and devastated. This results in him leaving Antoinette to mourn Hayley.
88	9	"We Have Not Long to Love"	Bethany Rooney	K.C. Perry & Michelle Paradise	June 20, 2018	T46.10009	0.77
Hope blames Elijah for Hayley's death, disregarding the fact that Elijah had lost his memories then. When the whispers in Hope's head grow stronger, Hope visits Declan. Elijah is also there. Hope proceeds to release her anger onto Elijah. Hope confesses to Klaus that by hurting Elijah, the whispers in her head stopped. Meanwhile, the vampires post flyers around the city, warning the werewolves that if they do not evacuate New Orleans, they will be forced out. This threat results in a faceoff between the werewolves and the vampires. When Vincent attempts to burn them, he finally realizes that they have a witch on their side. He realizes that Ivy is in danger and rushes to protect her; however, it is too late and she dies.
89	10	"There in the Disappearing Light"	Daniel Gillies	Eva McKenna & Jeffrey Lieber	July 11, 2018	T46.10010	0.77
After many failed attempts to rid Hope of the voices in her head, Klaus tracks down Roman and takes him. Antionette finds out about his abduction and asks Elijah to try to reason with Klaus. Hope ends up torturing Roman but is unwilling to kill him. Elijah comes up with a plan that will help Hope in ridding her of the voices. Meanwhile, Marcel manages to track down the extremists but ends up getting captured and drained of his venom. Josh arrives to rescue him and in the process Josh ends up dying. In the afterlife, he reunites with Aiden. Antoinette gathers up the extremists in a church and Marcel, Hope, Klaus, and Elijah show up. There, Hope releases her anger, quieting the voices and killing all of the extremists. Unbeknownst to them, Declan and Bill, who were finding documents for Declan up in the attic, are both seriously injured as a result of Hope's magic. Klaus heals Declan, but Bill dies, causing Hope to trigger her werewolf curse.
90	11	"'Til the Day I Die"	Geoff Shotz	Kyle Arrington & Marguerite MacIntyre	July 18, 2018	T46.10011	0.68
After Bill's death, Klaus notices a strange symptom present in Hope. He asks Davina for assistance, who conducts a spell but ends up finding out that Hope's condition will only worsen and will eventually kill her. Freya takes advantage of the Mikaelson's reuniting and decides to have her wedding. Freya ends up asking Rebekah to be the maid of honor, Vincent to be the best man, Kol to officiate, and Elijah to walk her down the aisle. Elijah and Vincent turn down the offer. Elijah reminisces about Andrea (who was actually Haley), a woman he met in France. After reading a letter from her, Elijah and Klaus decide to walk Freya down the aisle together. Meanwhile, Declan finds out about Marcel and threatens him, saying that he will gather the humans in retaliation. Marcel and Declan eventually come to a truce.
91	12	"The Tale of Two Wolves"	Rudy Persico	Carina Adly MacKenzie & Julie Plec	July 25, 2018	T46.10012	0.85
To save Hope's life, Klaus takes her to Mystic Falls with Elijah. There he asks Caroline to help him with the power of her daughters. His plan is to take out the magic from Hope and to put it in his body. Caroline is not happy about Klaus' decision but she accepts to help him, but Alaric disagrees, and he only accepts too when Klaus tells them he wants to kill himself after the spell. Hope faints and meets her mother, who shows her she has found peace. Hope wakes up in her father's arms. At midnight, while Hope is in transition for her first transformation into a werewolf, Caroline's daughters complete the spell and Klaus prepares to sacrifice himself with a white oak stake he kept hidden for decades in case he ever wanted an end to his existence.
92	13	"When the Saints Go Marching In"	Lance Anderson	Story by : Julie Plec; Teleplay by : Jeffrey Lieber	August 1, 2018	T46.10013	0.86
As Klaus attempts to kill himself, he is interrupted by Hope and imprisoned. He hallucinates Mikael, which causes him to break free, and Cami, who stops him from hurting Hope in time for Elijah to snap his neck. Klaus awakens to find that Elijah has absorbed some of the Hollow's magic so he can say his goodbyes. Caroline holds Klaus to his promise years ago to tour New Orleans. She encourages him to say goodbye to Hope and give her closure. Marcel, Rebekah, Elijah, Freya, and Keelin reminisce about Klaus as they are joined by Kol, then Klaus himself. Klaus says his goodbyes to everyone, then to Hope separately. Rebekah is promised the cure to vampirism so she can live a human life, then says goodbye to Klaus and Elijah at a park bench where Klaus intends to stake himself. Vincent agrees to help Freya and Keelin start a family despite having declined to earlier, and Marcel tells the vampires to leave the city. Rebekah finally accepts Marcel's marriage proposal. Elijah reveals his plan to die by Klaus' side, as his life's purpose to redeem Klaus has been fulfilled. They stake each other, destroying the Hollow for good, with their ashes spreading across New Orleans.

== Ratings ==
Viewership and ratings per episode of The Originals season 5
No.	Title	Air date	Rating/share (18–49)	Viewers (millions)	DVR (18–49)	DVR viewers (millions)	Total (18–49)	Total viewers (millions)
1	"Where You Left Your Heart"	April 18, 2018	0.4/2	0.97	0.3	0.67	0.7	1.64
2	"One Wrong Turn on Bourbon"	April 25, 2018	0.4/2	1.03	0.4	0.79	0.8	1.82
3	"Ne Me Quitte Pas"	May 2, 2018	0.4/2	0.90	0.4	0.91	0.8	1.80
4	"Between the Devil and the Deep Blue Sea"	May 9, 2018	0.3/1	0.76	0.4	0.85	0.7	1.61
5	"Don't It Just Break Your Heart"	May 16, 2018	0.3/1	0.80	0.4	0.81	0.7	1.61
6	"What, Will, I, Have, Left"	May 30, 2018	0.3/1	0.82	0.3	0.80	0.6	1.62
7	"God's Gonna Trouble the Water"	June 6, 2018	0.2/1	0.77	0.4	0.79	0.6	1.56
8	"The Kindness of Strangers"	June 13, 2018	0.3/1	0.86	0.4	0.93	0.7	1.79
9	"We Have Not Long to Love"	June 20, 2018	0.3/1	0.77	0.4	0.84	0.7	1.61
10	"There in the Disappearing Light"	July 11, 2018	0.3/1	0.77	0.3	0.81	0.6	1.57
11	"'Til the Day I Die"	July 18, 2018	0.2/1	0.68	0.3	0.72	0.5	1.40
12	"The Tale of Two Wolves"	July 25, 2018	0.3/1	0.85	TBD	TBD	TBD	TBD
13	"When the Saints Go Marching In"	August 1, 2018	0.3/1	0.86	0.2	0.43	0.5	1.30 (Note: Live +7 ratings were not available, so Live +3 ratings have been used instead.)
