= Legacies (TV series) =

2018 American supernatural drama television series

- Genre: Drama; Supernatural; Fantasy
- Created by: Julie Plec
- Starring: Danielle Rose Russell; Aria Shahghasemi; Kaylee Bryant; Jenny Boyd; Quincy Fouse; Peyton Alex Smith; Matt Davis; Chris Lee; Ben Levin; Leo Howard; Omono Okojie
- Composer: Michael Suby
- Country of origin: United States
- Original language: English
- No. of seasons: 4
- No. of episodes: 68 (list of episodes)

Production
- Executive producers: Julie Plec; Brett Matthews; Leslie Morgenstein; Gina Girolamo
- Cinematography: Michael Karasick; Darren Genet; John Smith; Datan Hopson; Rob C. Givens; David Daniel; Bradford Lipson
- Editors: Tony Solomons; Evan J. Warner; Chad Rubel; Michael Trent; Peter Lam; Erik Presant; Carol Stutz; William Ford-Conway
- Running time: 41–42 minutes
- Production companies: My So-Called Company; Alloy Entertainment; CBS Studios (Note: Credited as CBS Television Studios for seasons 1–2); Warner Bros. Television Studios

Original release
- Network: The CW
- Release: October 25, 2018 – June 16, 2022

Related
- The Vampire Diaries; The Originals

Legacies is an American fantasy drama television series, created by Julie Plec, that aired from October 25, 2018, to June 16, 2022, on the CW. A spinoff of The Originals, it is part of The Vampire Diaries Universe, and features characters from both The Originals and its predecessor, The Vampire Diaries. Danielle Rose Russell stars as the 17-year-old Hope Mikaelson, continuing the role she originated in the fifth and final season of The Originals. Matt Davis also stars in the series, reprising his role as Alaric Saltzman from The Vampire Diaries. In May 2022, it was announced that the fourth season would be its final season.

== Premise ==
Legacies follows Hope Mikaelson, the daughter of Klaus Mikaelson and Hayley Marshall, who is descended from some of the most powerful ancient, original vampires, werewolf, and witch bloodlines. Two years after the events of The Originals, 17-year-old Hope attends the Salvatore School for the Young and Gifted, run by Alaric Saltzman and also attended by his twin witch daughters Lizzie and Josie Saltzman. The school provides a secret haven where supernatural beings can learn to control their abilities and impulses safe from the outside world. The institution is designed to educate and protect young supernatural beings, including vampires, witches, and werewolves. The series explores their challenges in mastering their powers, forming relationships, and confronting various magical creatures and threats along the way.

== Episodes ==
| Season | Episodes | Originally released | |
| Season | Episodes | First released | Last released |
|---|---|---|---|
| 1 | 16 | October 25, 2018 | March 28, 2019 |
| 2 | 16 | October 10, 2019 | March 26, 2020 |
| 3 | 16 | January 21, 2021 | June 24, 2021 |
| 4 | 20 | October 14, 2021 | June 16, 2022 |

== Cast and characters ==
=== Main ===
- Danielle Rose Russell as Hope Mikaelson: a teenage orphan and student at the Salvatore School for the Young and Gifted who is descended from some of the most powerful vampire, werewolf, and witch bloodlines via her parents, Klaus Mikaelson and Hayley Marshall, making her the first "tribrid".
- Aria Shahghasemi as Landon Kirby: Rafael's foster brother and a friend and romantic interest of Hope, who eventually becomes her boyfriend and fellow student at the Salvatore School. Initially thought to be a human, he is then suspected of being a supernatural being after vampire powers like compulsion do not work on him. The character was introduced in The Originals season 5 as a local boy in Mystic Falls who has a crush on Hope.
- Kaylee Bryant as Josie Saltzman (seasons 1–4 (Note: Bryant is last credited in the ninth episode of the fourth season, "I Can't Be the One to Stop You".)): a witch and student at the Salvatore School. She is Alaric's 15-year-old daughter, Lizzie's twin, and was named after her biological mother, Josette "Jo" Laughlin of the powerful Gemini coven. Josie is deferential to her sister, Lizzie, and lacks self-confidence, often putting Lizzie first in lieu of herself. Bryant departs the show midway through season 4. The character was introduced in The Vampire Diaries as a baby and toddler and then a young teen in The Originals.
- Jenny Boyd as Lizzie Saltzman: a witch and student at the Salvatore School. She is Alaric's 15-year-old daughter, Josie's twin, and was named after Elizabeth Forbes, the late mother of the twins' surrogate mother, Caroline Forbes. Lizzie is bipolar. She later becomes a heretic vampire-witch. The character was introduced in The Vampire Diaries as a baby and toddler and then a young teen in The Originals.
- Quincy Fouse as Milton "MG" Greasley: A good-natured vampire who works as Alaric's student aide and is friendly with the Saltzman twins and romantically interested in Lizzie. He struggles to control his thirst and risks being a ripper.
- Peyton Alex Smith as Rafael Waithe (seasons 1–3; special guest star season 4): a recently triggered werewolf and Landon's foster brother and best friend. After suffering an abusive childhood in the foster system, he becomes a student at the Salvatore School and alpha of the school werewolf pack. He has romantic entanglements with Lizzie, Hope and Josie.
- Matt Davis as Alaric Saltzman: Josie and Lizzie's father and the human headmaster and co-founder of the Salvatore School. He is close to Hope and trains her privately, acting like a surrogate father to her after Klaus's death. Davis described Alaric's role in the series as "somewhere between Professor X and Dumbledore". The character was introduced in The Vampire Diaries.
- Chris Lee as Kaleb Hawkins (seasons 2–4; recurring, seasons 1–2): a brash vampire student who is revealed to be drinking the blood of humans, a practice that is banned at the school. In the fourth season, he becomes half-dragon after Malivore causes a dragon to possess Kaleb. He is close with MG.
- Ben Levin as Jed Tien (seasons 3–4; recurring, seasons 1–2): the hot-headed and violent alpha werewolf at the school, who is soon replaced as alpha by Rafael. He later becomes friends with the others and Rafael and stops his violence.
- Leo Howard as Ethan Machado (seasons 3–4; guest, season 2): a student at Mystic Falls High School and Sheriff Mac's son. He becomes friends with MG and romantically interested in Lizzie which causes tension between him and MG. In the fourth season, he is turned into a mythical creature called a pukwudgie by Malivore, which grants Ethan the power of phasing and teleportation.
- Omono Okojie as Cleo Sowande (season 4; recurring, seasons 3–4): a witch and a new student at the Salvatore School who becomes Hope's roommate. She is later revealed to have been a slave of Malivore and a muse. She joins the school's students, aiding in their fight against Malivore.

=== Recurring ===
- Demetrius Bridges as Dorian Williams: the librarian and a teacher at the Salvatore School. He has a master's degree in library sciences and a strong knowledge of the supernatural, being a former student of Alaric's. The character was introduced in The Vampire Diaries. He is dating Emma.
- Lulu Antariksa as Penelope Park (season 1): a mischief-stirring witch and Josie's ex-girlfriend who despises Lizzie. She enjoys meddling in other's lives.
- Karen David as Emma Tig: a witch and the school's guidance counselor. She represents the lower school in the honour council. She takes an indefinite leave-of-absence from the Salvatore School near the end of the first season. She returns later in the second season, ultimately leaving with Dorian. She returns to Mystic Falls with Dorian in the third season.
- Ben Geurens as the Necromancer: one of the creatures from Malivore who has the power to bring back the dead
- Nick Fink as Ryan Clarke: a seemingly good-natured agent working for Triad Industries, he is later revealed to have sinister motives and a connection to both Malivore and Landon
- Elijah B. Moore as Wade Rivers (season 4; co-starring, seasons 2–4): A student at the Salvatore School who was initially believed to be a witch
- Ebboney Wilson as Kym Hawkins (season 2): Kaleb's human sister with whom MG begins a relationship
- Bianca Kajlich as Sheriff Mac (seasons 2–3): the new sheriff in Mystic Falls. She is Ethan and Maya's mother
- Bianca Santos as Maya Machado (season 2; guest, season 4): a student at Mystic Falls High School who is Sheriff Mac's daughter and Ethan's sister
- Alexis Denisof as Professor Vardemus (season 2; guest, season 4): the temporary new headmaster of the Salvatore School, before the position is given back to Alaric
- Thomas Doherty as Sebastian (season 2): an over-600-year-old vampire who died as a teen
- Olivia Liang as Alyssa Chang (seasons 2–3): a student witch at the Salvatore School who likes to instigate drama among her peers
- Charles Jazz Terrier as Chad (seasons 2–3): a follower of and servant to the Necromancer
- Giorgia Whigham as Jade (seasons 2–3): a vampire who turned off her humanity after accidentally killing a friend years prior
- Courtney Bandeko as Finch Tarrayo (seasons 3–4): a student at Mystic Falls High School in whom Josie takes a romantic interest
- Zane Phillips as Ben (season 4), a demigod also known as Prometheus who has a strange effect on monsters
- Piper Curda as Jen (season 4), a student in Vardemus' college class
- Luke Mitchell as Ken (season 4), the King of the Gods who has been put in stasis by Jen

=== Special guest stars ===
- Zach Roerig as Matt Donovan (in "This Is the Part Where You Run", "Hope Is Not the Goal"): the town's sheriff and later mayor who has a troubled past with the supernatural. The character was introduced in The Vampire Diaries.
- Steven R. McQueen as Jeremy Gilbert (in "We're Being Punked, Pedro"): Alaric's old friend who saves Rafael and Landon from a werewolf hunter. The character was introduced in The Vampire Diaries.
- Riley Voelkel as Freya Mikaelson (in "That's Nothing I Had to Remember", "We All Knew This Day Was Coming", and "Everything That Can Be Lost May Also Be Found"): One of Hope's aunts and a powerful witch. The character was introduced in The Originals.
- Chris Wood as Kai Parker (in "Kai Parker Screwed Us", "You Can't Save Them All"): Josie and Lizzie's evil maternal uncle who murdered their mother Jo, who was his twin and Alaric's fiancée. The character was introduced in The Vampire Diaries.
- Claire Holt as Rebekah Mikaelson (in "I Thought You'd Be Happier to See Me", "Everything That Can Be Lost May Also Be Found"): One of Hope's aunts and one of the Original vampires. The character was introduced in The Vampire Diaries.
- Rebecca Breeds as Aurora de Martel (recurring, season 4): An ancient vampire who was Rebekah's first sire, Aurora was romantically involved with Klaus in the past. She is portrayed as having a condition akin to bipolar disorder, which intensified after being turned into a vampire. She was desiccated in the third season of The Originals, where the character was introduced.
- Charles Michael Davis as Marcel Gerard (in "Everything That Can Be Lost May Also Be Found"): Rebekah's husband and Hope's uncle, Marcel was first turned into a vampire years before by Klaus and became part of the family. The character was introduced in The Vampire Diaries.
- Nathaniel Buzolic as Kol Mikaelson (in "Everything That Can Be Lost May Also Be Found"): Hope's uncle and one of the Original vampires. The character was introduced in The Vampire Diaries.
- Candice King as Caroline Forbes Salvatore (in "Just Don't Be a Stranger, Okay?"): (Note: King also provided an uncredited voice-over in "Salvatore: The Musical!") Lizzie and Josie's vampire mother and the co-founder of the Salvatore School with Alaric. The character was introduced in The Vampire Diaries.
- Joseph Morgan as Klaus Mikaelson (in "Just Don't Be a Stranger, Okay?"): Hope's father, the original hybrid and a member of the Mikaelson family. The character was introduced in The Vampire Diaries.

=== Notable guest stars ===
- Jodi Lyn O'Keefe as Jo Laughlin (in "Mombie Dearest"): Alaric's deceased witch fiancée, and Josie and Lizzie's biological mother. The character was introduced in The Vampire Diaries.
- Ayelet Zurer as Seylah Chelon (in "Maybe I Should Start from the End", "I Wouldn't Be Standing Here If It Weren't For You"): Landon's mother, who abandoned him at birth
- Jedidiah Goodacre as Roman (in "Let's Just Finish the Dance", "I'll Tell You a Story"): Hope's former classmate and boyfriend who is a 90-year-old vampire and was involved in the death of her mother. The character was introduced in The Originals.
- Summer Fontana as young Hope Marshall (in "A New Hope", "I Thought You'd Be Happier to See Me"): A younger 13-year-old Hope, from when Lizzie and Josie were 11 years old; Fontana first played 7-year-old Hope in season 4 of The Originals.

== Production ==
=== Development ===
In August 2017, it was announced that early discussions on the development of a spinoff of The Originals focusing on Hope Mikaelson, the daughter of Klaus Mikaelson and Hayley Marshall, were taking place with Julie Plec, creator of The Originals and co-creator of The Vampire Diaries. In January 2018, it was revealed that a pilot for the spinoff had been ordered; Plec penned the pilot script and is credited with creating the series. It was announced in March 2018 that the spinoff had been ordered to pilot, but instead of a traditional pilot, a fifteen-minute pilot presentation of the series would be presented to The CW.

On May 11, 2018, it was announced that the spinoff, titled Legacies, had been ordered to series for the 2018–19 U.S. television season. In June 2018, it was announced that the series would premiere on October 25, 2018. On October 8, 2018, The CW announced that they had ordered three additional scripts for the series, bringing the first season total script order to sixteen episodes.

On January 31, 2019, The CW renewed the series for a second season. The second season premiered on October 10, 2019. On January 7, 2020, the series was renewed for a third season, which premiered on January 21, 2021. On February 3, 2021, the series was renewed for a fourth season which premiered on October 14, 2021. On May 12, 2022, it was reported that the fourth season would be the last season.

=== Filming ===
In March 2020, production on the second season was shut down as a result of the COVID-19 pandemic. Only 16 of the ordered 20 episodes had been completed. On March 26, 2020, it was announced that the sixteenth episode that aired that same night would serve as a spring finale as the production team had run out of episodes to air following the production shut down. Filming on the third season began on October 15, 2020. Production on the third season finished on June 24, 2021. Twenty episodes for the season were filmed, but the remaining four were held for the fourth season. Filming on the fourth season concluded on April 27, 2022.

=== Casting ===
It was announced in March 2018 that The Vampire Diaries veteran Matt Davis would reprise the role of Alaric Saltzman and that Danielle Rose Russell would star as Hope Mikaelson. Quincy Fouse, Jenny Boyd, Kaylee Bryant, and Aria Shahghasemi were also set to star. Shahghasemi would debut in the twelfth episode of the fifth season of The Originals as Hope's friend Landon. It was revealed at San Diego Comic-Con in July 2018 that Paul Wesley would direct an episode and that Zach Roerig would appear in the series. Steven R. McQueen was revealed to be reprising his role as Jeremy Gilbert in the series' third episode.

In July 2019, it was announced that Thomas Doherty would appear in the second season and that Alexis Denisof would recur in the second season as Professor Vardemus. In August 2019, Bianca Santos, Bianca Kajlich, and Leo Howard were cast in recurring roles for the second season. In September 2019, it was reported that Riley Voelkel would reprise her role as Freya Mikaelson for the sixth episode of the second season. In November 2019, it was announced that Chris Wood would reprise his role of Kai Parker in the twelfth episode of the second season. The same month, it was reported that Chris Lee had been promoted to a series regular during production on the second season and that Olivia Liang had been cast in a recurring role for the second season. On January 20, 2020, Charles Jazz Terrier was cast in a recurring capacity.

In September 2020, it was announced that Leo Howard and Ben Levin had been promoted to series regulars for the third season. On January 27, 2021, Omono Okojie was cast in a recurring role for the third season. The same month, it was revealed that Peyton Alex Smith was leaving the regular cast. Candice King performed an uncredited voiceover as Lizzie and Josie's mother, Caroline Forbes from The Vampire Diaries, in the third-season episode "Salvatore: The Musical!"

On August 27, 2021, it was reported that Okojie had been promoted to a series regular for the fourth season. Claire Holt reprised her role as Rebekah Mikaelson for the fifth episode of the fourth season. In December 2021, Zane Phillips joined the cast in a recurring capacity for the fourth season. In December 2021, Kaylee Bryant left the series in the ninth episode of the fourth season. In February 2022, Piper Curda was cast in a recurring role for the fourth season. In March 2022, Charles Michael Davis and Nathaniel Buzolic were set to reprise their roles as Marcel Gerard and Kol Mikaelson for the April 14, 2022, episode of the fourth season. In April 2022, it was announced that Luke Mitchell was joining the fourth season in a recurring role. In June 2022, it was announced that Joseph Morgan would reprise his role as Klaus Mikaelson in the series finale.

== Broadcast ==
The first season of Legacies premiered on October 25, 2018 and concluded on March 28, 2019, on The CW. The second season debuted on October 10, 2019 and finished on March 26, 2020. The third season premiered on January 21, 2021 and concluded on June 24, 2021. The fourth season premiered on October 14, 2021.

== Home media ==
A manufacture-on-demand DVD for the first season was released by the Warner Archive Collection on October 22, 2019.

== Reception ==
=== Critical response ===
On the review aggregator website Rotten Tomatoes, the series has an approval rating of 82% based on 11 reviews, with an average rating of 8.0 out of 10. The website's critic consensus states: "A fun and fast-paced addition to The CW's stable of supernatural high school series, Legacies emerges from the shadows of its sister shows an unexpected delight." Metacritic, which uses a weighted average, assigned a score of 59 out of 100 based on 5 critics, indicating "mixed or average reviews".

=== Ratings ===
Viewership and ratings per season of Legacies
| Season | Timeslot (ET) | Episodes | First aired | | Last aired | | TV season | Viewership rank | Avg. viewers (millions) | 18–49 rank | Avg. 18–49 rating |
| Season | Timeslot (ET) | Episodes | Date | Viewers (millions) | Date | Viewers (millions) | TV season | Viewership rank | Avg. viewers (millions) | 18–49 rank | Avg. 18–49 rating |
|---|---|---|---|---|---|---|---|---|---|---|---|
| 1 | Thursday 9:00 p.m. | 16 | October 25, 2018 | 1.12 | March 28, 2019 | 0.93 | 2018–19 | 176 | 1.52 | 147 | 0.6 |
| 2 | Thursday 9:00 p.m. | 16 | October 10, 2019 | 0.80 | March 26, 2020 | 0.67 | 2019–20 | 121 | 1.41 | 119 | 0.5 |
| 3 | Thursday 9:00 p.m. | 16 | January 21, 2021 | 0.69 | June 24, 2021 | 0.57 | 2020–21 | 145 | 1.01 | 132 | 0.3 |
| 4 | Thursday 9:00 p.m. | 20 | October 14, 2021 | 0.33 | June 16, 2022 | 0.41 | 2021–22 | TBD | TBD | TBD | TBD |
