= Danielle Rose Russell =

American actress and former model (born 1999)

- Born: October 31, 1999 (age 27); Pequannock Township, New Jersey, U.S.
- Education: Berkeley College (BBA)
- Occupations: Actress, former model
- Years active: 2013–present

Danielle Rose Russell (born October 31, 1999) is an American actress and former model. She is best known for her role as Hope Andrea Mikaelsen in the The CW supernatural drama series The Originals (2018) and Legacies (2018–2022).

== Early life and education ==
Russell was born in Pequannock Township, New Jersey, and raised in West Milford, New Jersey. She is the daughter of Rosemary Rado, a former dancer and Rockette, and Ricky Russell, a former singer. She initially pursued modeling in her youth, appearing in print ads and commercials, before pursuing regional theater and appearing in several school plays at Holy Spirit School in Pequannock, New Jersey. As of 2018, she was finishing high school via online coursework.

Russell originally attended Holy Spirit School of Pequannock Township, New Jersey. It was there, Russell performed in school plays and then transitioned to online homeschooling to pursue modeling and acting. While working on the set of Legacies, Russell pursued higher education at Berkeley College via their online program. As of 2022, Russell has graduated Cum laude with a Bachelor's degree in Business Administration and is currently working on a Master of Business Administration at the same institution, citing emphasis on leadership skills and business management as an important component of working in the entertainment industry.

== Career ==
Russell's first role was in the film A Walk Among the Tombstones (2014), playing the 14-year-old daughter of a Russian drug dealer. The next year, she appeared in Aloha (2015), as the daughter of Rachel McAdams's character. In 2016, Russell appeared in six episodes on the TV series The Last Tycoon. Russell played a supporting role in the 2017 film Wonder.

In July 2017, she was cast as the teenage Hope Mikaelson in the fifth and final season of The CW television series The Originals. In May 2018, it was reported that she would continue her role as Hope Mikaelson on The CW's Legacies, a spinoff of The Originals. She was nominated for a Teen Choice Award for Choice Sci-Fi/Fantasy TV Actress in 2019 for the role. Russell continued on Legacies for four seasons, with the series concluding on June 16, 2022.

== Filmography ==
Film
Year	Title	Role	Note
2014	A Walk Among the Tombstones	Lucia	
2015	Aloha	Grace Woodside	
2016	Pandemic	Megan Thomas	
2017	Wonder	Miranda Navas	
2018	Measure of a Man	Joanie Williams	
2026	The All-Nighter	Ashley	
TBA	My New Friend Jim	Maria	
TBA	Unromantic (short film)	TBA	

Television
Year	Title	Role	Note
2016–2017	The Last Tycoon	Darla Miner	Recurring role
2018	The Originals	Hope Mikaelson	Main role (season 5)
2018–2022	Legacies	Hope Mikaelson / Aurora de Martel	Main role
