= Candice King =

American actress (born 1987)

Candice Accola
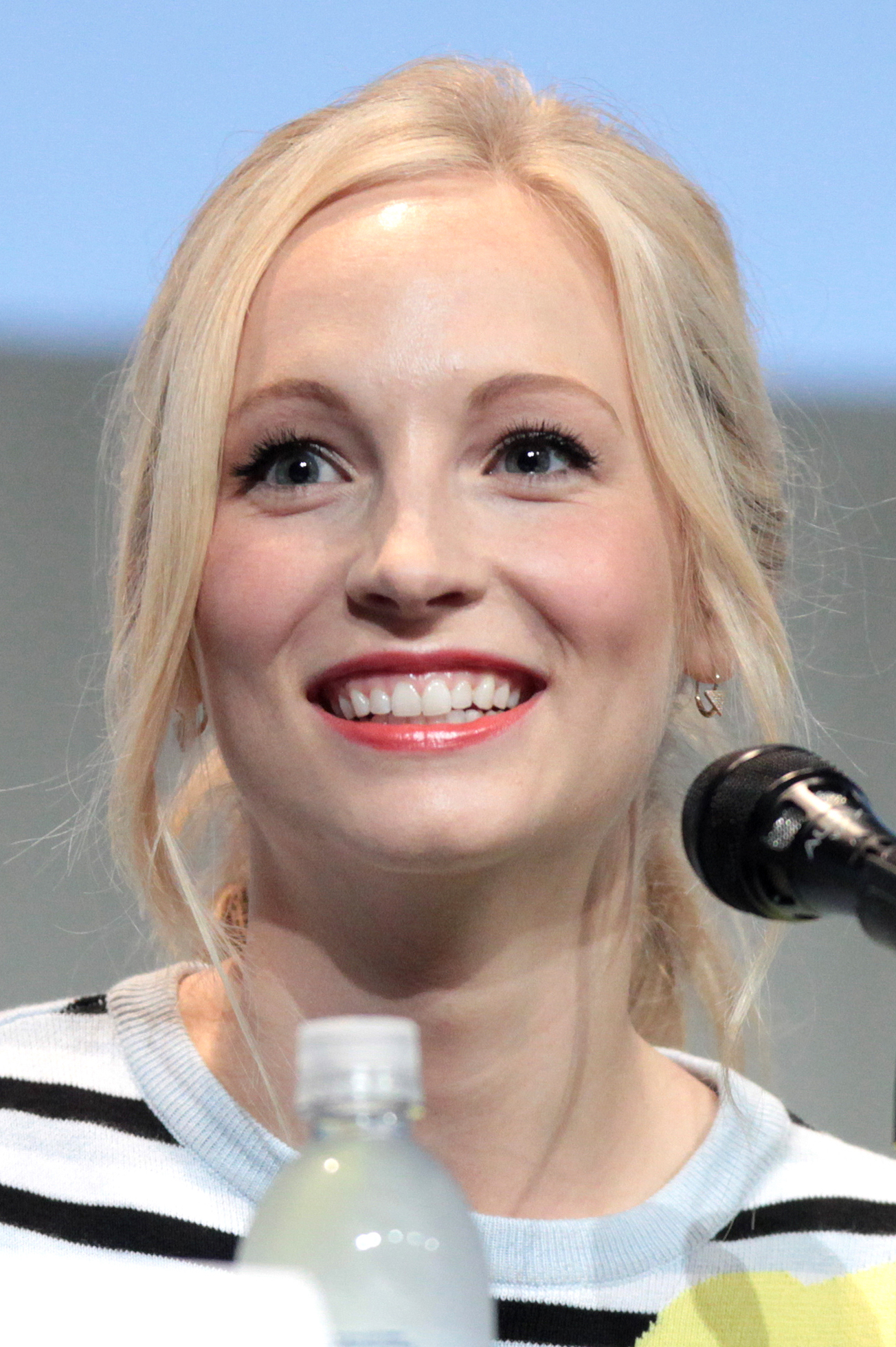
- King in 2015
- Born: Candice Accola; May 13, 1987 (age 39); Houston, Texas, U.S.
- Occupation: Actress
- Years active: 2006–present
- Spouses: Joe King (m. 2014; div. 2022) Steven Krueger (m. 2026)
- Children: 3

Candice King (née Accola, born May 13, 1987) is an American singer, songwriter, and actress best known as Caroline Forbes in The Vampire Diaries and its spin-offs, The Originals and Legacies.

== Early life ==
Candice Accola was born on May 13, 1987, in Houston, Texas, the daughter of Carolyn Clark Accola, an environmental engineer, and Kevin Accola, a cardiothoracic surgeon. Her parents were natives of southern Illinois, her father from Carbondale and her mother from Herrin. She grew up in Edgewood, Florida, and attended Lake Highland Preparatory School in Orlando. She has one younger brother.

== Career ==
=== Music ===
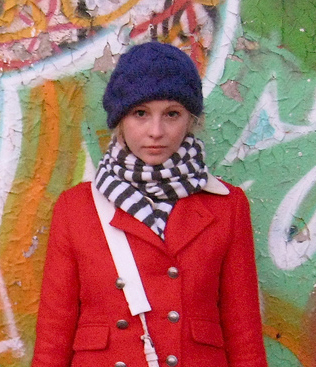
Accola in 2008

In December 2006, Accola released her debut album, It's Always the Innocent Ones, independently in the United States. She co-wrote 12 of the 14 tracks on the record. The remaining tracks were a cover of 'Til Tuesday's hit "Voices Carry" and American Hi-Fi's "The Breakup Song" rewritten in a female version as "Our Breakup Song".

Accola toured as a backing singer for Miley Cyrus's Best of Both Worlds Tour. She appeared as herself in the 2008 3D concert film Hannah Montana & Miley Cyrus: Best of Both Worlds Concert.

In February 2011, Accola performed a cover of "Eternal Flame" by The Bangles on The Vampire Diaries.

=== Acting ===
Accola had guest appearances in a number of television series such as How I Met Your Mother, Supernatural, and Drop Dead Diva. In July 2009, she starred in the horror film Deadgirl which centers on two high-school boys who discover an immortal woman in an abandoned asylum. That same year, Accola had a bit-role in The Hannah Montana Movie.

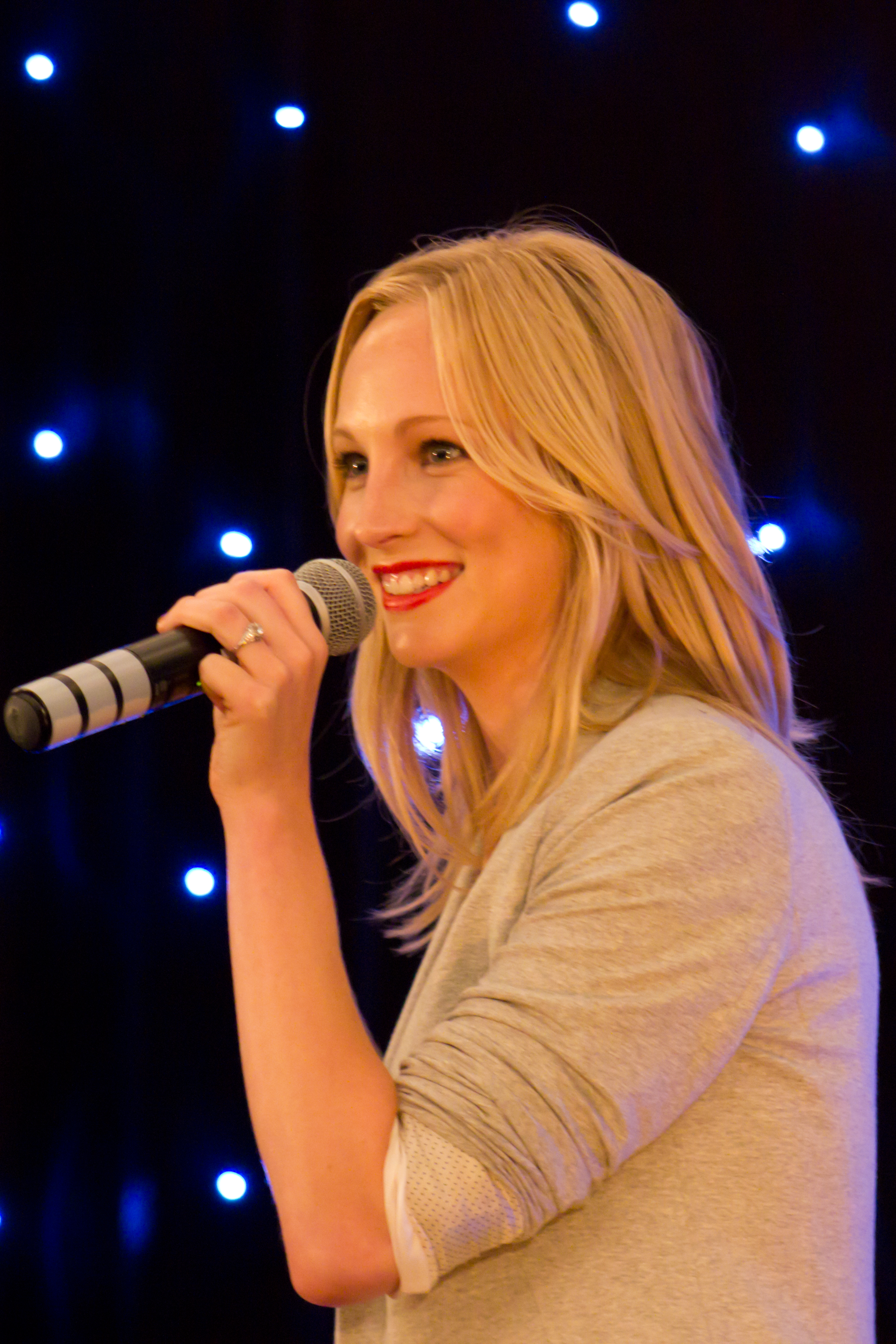
Accola at a press conference in the United Kingdom in 2013

In 2009, she was cast in The CW supernatural drama series The Vampire Diaries, an adaptation of the book series of the same name. Accola plays the role of Caroline Forbes, one of the main characters of the show. Her work garnered her two Teen Choice Awards. In June 2012, she joined the second season of the web series Dating Rules From My Future Self, as Chloe Cunningham, a 26-year-old woman who believes love does not exist. The series centers on a girl receiving romance advice from herself ten years in the future by text messages.

In 2018, Accola reprised her role as Caroline in the final season of The Vampire Diaries spin-off The Originals.

In August 2019, it was announced that Accola was cast as Kimberly in the 2020 romance sequel After We Collided.

In 2022, she reprised her role as Caroline again in the final season of Legacies.

== Personal life ==
Along with her The Vampire Diaries co-stars Michael Trevino and Ian Somerhalder, Accola supports the It Gets Better Project, an organization that focuses to prevent suicide among LGBT youth.

Accola started dating musician Joe King of The Fray after they met at a Super Bowl event in February 2012. Her costar Nina Dobrev introduced them. They became engaged in May 2013, and married on October 18, 2014, in New Orleans, Louisiana. Accola became stepmother to King’s two daughters from his previous marriage.

Accola has two daughters; born in January 2016, and December 2020, respectively. In May 2022, Accola filed for divorce but retained the surname King.

In December 2023, Accola confirmed she was dating American actor Steven Krueger. They married in a private ceremony in 2026. In May 2026, Accola and Krueger welcomed their first child together and her third overall, a son.

== Filmography ==
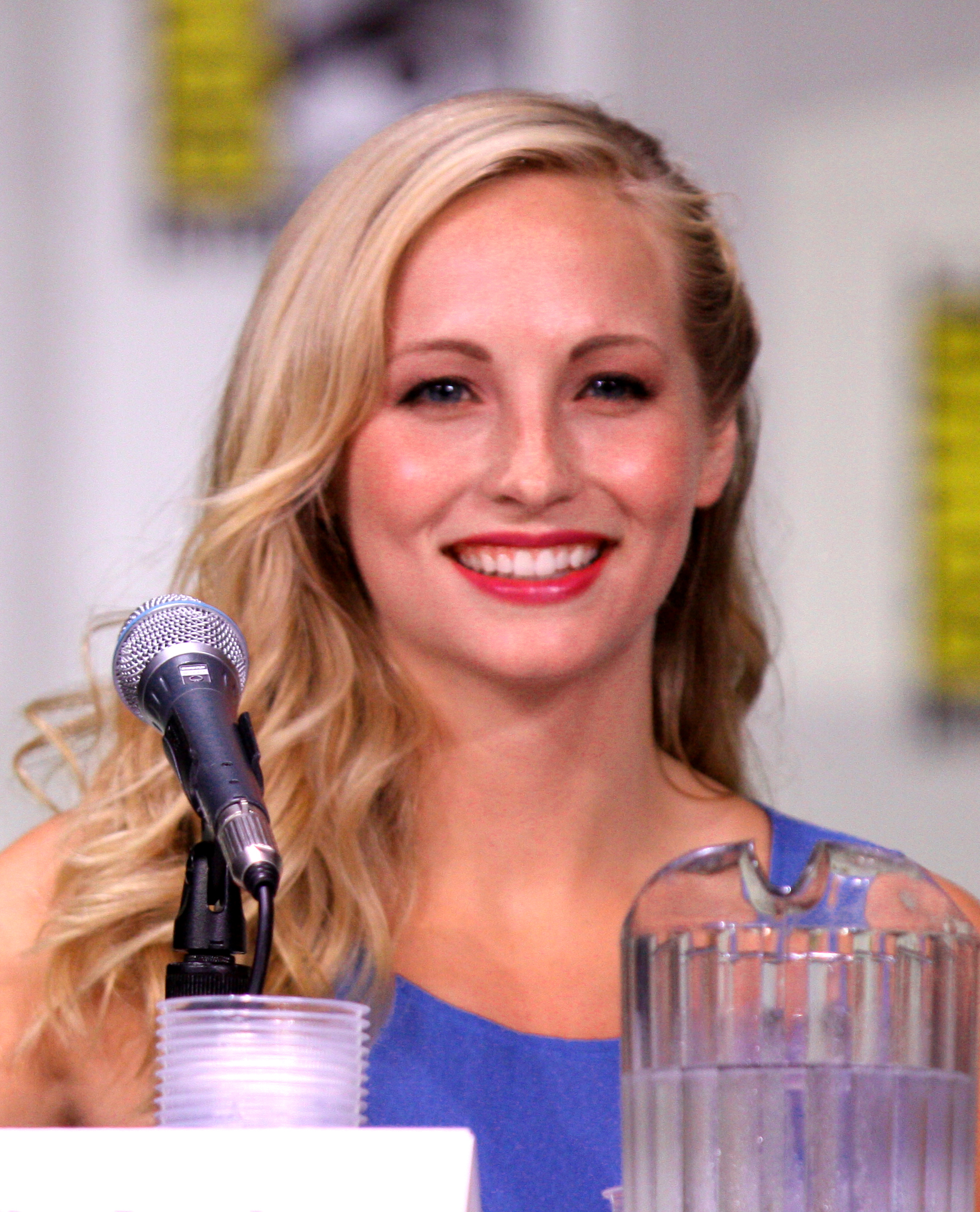
Accola at the 2011 San Diego Comic-Con

=== Film ===
Year	Title	Role	Notes
2007	Pirate Camp	Annalisa/Tom	
2007	Juno	Amanda	
2007	On the Doll	Melody	
2007	X's & O's	Gwen's friend	
2008	Deadgirl	JoAnn	
2009	Love Hurts	Sharon	
2010	Kingshighway	Sophia	
2011	The Truth About Angels	Caitlin Stone	
2018	Splitting the Bill	None	Video short
2020	After We Collided	Kimberly	

=== Television ===
Year	Title	Role	Notes
2007	How I Met Your Mother	Amy	Episode: "Something Borrowed"
2009	Supernatural	Amanda Heckerling	Episode: "After School Special"
2009	Greek	Alice	Episode: "Isn't It Bro-mantic?"
2009–2017	The Vampire Diaries	Caroline Forbes	Main role
2010	Drop Dead Diva	Jessica Orlando	Episode: "Begin Again"
2012	Dating Rules from My Future Self	Chloe Cunningham / Future Chloe	Main role (season 2); also producer
2018	The Originals	Caroline Forbes	Recurring role (season 5)
2019	The Orville	Solana Kitan	Episode: "Home"
2021–2022	Legacies	Caroline Forbes	Episode: "Salvatore: The Musical!" (voice-over); Episode: "Just Don't Be A Stranger, Okay?" (Special Guest Star)
2021	Christmas in Tune	Belle	Television film
2022	Suitcase Killer: The Melanie McGuire Story	Melanie McGuire	Television film
2025	We Were Liars	Bess Sinclair	Main role

As herself
Year	Title	Notes
2008	Hannah Montana & Miley Cyrus: Best of Both Worlds Concert	Background singer
2011	When I Was 17	Episode dated February 12, 2011
2011	The Perfect Love Triangle: Vampires, Werewolves, Witches	Video short
2011	Myth & Mystery	Video short
2011	Howling at the Moon	Video short
2011	Her Own Worst Enemy	Video short
2013	Big Morning Buzz Live	Episode: "Candice Accola/Robin Thicke/Stevie J"
2013	Whose Line Is It Anyway	Episode: "Candice Accola"
2013–2014	The Late Late Show with Craig Ferguson	Episode #10.77, LL Cool J/Candice Accola
2014	Fashion Police	Season 9, episode 12

== Awards and nominations ==
Year	Organization	Category	Work	Result	Ref.
2012	Teen Choice Awards	Scene Stealer Female	The Vampire Diaries	Won	
2013	Teen Choice Awards	Scene Stealer Female	The Vampire Diaries	Nominated	
2014	Teen Choice Awards	Scene Stealer Female	The Vampire Diaries	Won	
2015	Teen Choice Awards	Choice TV Actress Fantasy/Sci-Fi	The Vampire Diaries	Nominated	
2015	Teen Choice Awards	Choice TV: Liplock (with Paul Wesley)	The Vampire Diaries	Nominated	
2016	Teen Choice Awards	Choice TV Actress Fantasy/Sci-Fi	The Vampire Diaries	Nominated	
2016	Teen Choice Awards	Choice TV: Liplock (with Paul Wesley)	The Vampire Diaries	Nominated	
