= Julie Plec =

American screenwriter

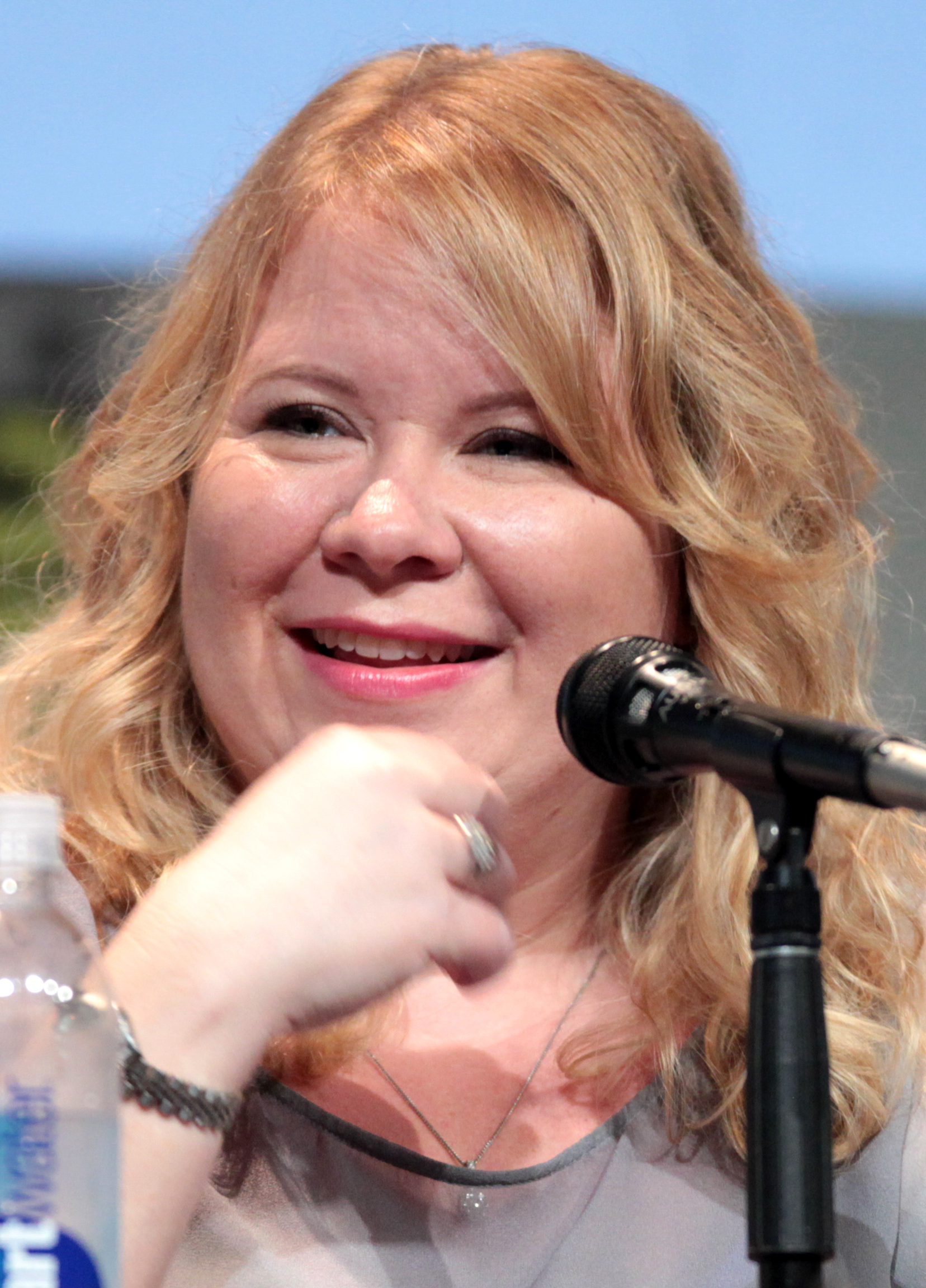
- Plec at the 2015 San Diego Comic-Con
- Born: May 26, 1972 (age 54)
- Education: Northwestern University
- Occupations: Producer, screenwriter and director
- Writing career
- Period: Writer: 1994–present
- Notable works: Scream; Kyle XY; The Vampire Diaries; The Originals; Legacies; Roswell, New Mexico; Vampire Academy

Julie Plec (born May 26, 1972) is an American television producer, writer and director, known for her work on The CW television series The Vampire Diaries (2009–2017) which she co-created with Kevin Williamson, and its spin-offs The Originals (2013–2018) and Legacies (2018–2022). She also developed the limited series Containment (2016).

== Early life ==
Plec graduated from Northwestern University in 1994. She was originally a film major but transferred out of the program halfway through and graduated from an interdepartmental major.

== Career ==
Having acted as co-producer and assistant to Wes Craven on both Scream 2 and Scream 3, Plec worked on another film for Craven, Cursed, which was released in 2005 and starred Christina Ricci, Jesse Eisenberg, Joshua Jackson, and Shannon Elizabeth. The film suffered many script and scheduling difficulties during production and ultimately failed to perform at the box office.

From 2006-2009 Plec was a producer and writer for Kyle XY.

Plec developed a new TV series for The CW entitled The Vampire Diaries, which was adapted from a novel series of the same name by L. J. Smith. The series follows the life of Elena Gilbert (Nina Dobrev), who falls in love with vampire Stefan Salvatore (Paul Wesley), and soon finds herself caught in a love triangle between Stefan and his older brother, Damon (Ian Somerhalder), while the brothers are also being haunted by the past they've had with Katherine Pierce (also played by Dobrev). The series also focuses on the lives of Elena's friends and other inhabitants of the fictional town of Mystic Falls, Virginia. The Vampire Diaries premiered on September 10, 2009, and has become a domestic and international hit.

In November 2012, Deadline Hollywood announced that Julie Plec and Greg Berlanti had attained the rights to The Tomorrow People and commissioned a pilot written by Phil Klemmer. This occurred after a similar rights option expired to an aborted attempt two years previously. It was announced on January 28, 2013 that the revival had received a pilot order from The CW. On May 9, 2013 the series was picked up for the 2013–14 season by The CW.

On January 11, 2013, it was announced that a back-door pilot of The Vampire Diaries entitled The Originals focusing on the Original family of vampires was in the works. The pilot aired in April 2013 as part of The Vampire Diaries' fourth season. It was soon after picked up for series by The CW, which aired its first season in the 2013–14 season. Joseph Morgan reprises his role as Klaus. It also stars The Vampire Diaries actors Daniel Gillies, Claire Holt and Phoebe Tonkin as well as new cast members. This second spin-off attempt is carried out by Julie Plec, with no involvement by Kevin Williamson. In 2020, her My So-Called Company signed a deal with Universal Television.

== Filmography ==
=== Film ===
| Year | Title | Notes |
|---|---|---|
| 1995 | Vampire in Brooklyn | Director assistant |
| 1996 | Scream | Assistant: Mr. Craven |
| 1997 | Scream 2 | Associate producer |
| 1999 | Teaching Mrs. Tingle | Associate producer |
| 2000 | The Broken Hearts Club | Co-producer |
| 2000 | Scream 3 | Co-producer |
| 2005 | Cursed | Co-producer |

=== Television ===
The numbers in writing credits refer to the number of episodes.

Key
| † | Denotes television series that have not yet aired. |

| Year | Title | Credited as | | | | | Network | Notes |
| Year | Title | Creator | Producer | Writer | Executive producer | Showrunner | Network | Notes |
|---|---|---|---|---|---|---|---|---|
| 1999 | Dawson's Creek | No | No | No | No | No | The WB | Production consultant Episode: "High Risk Behavior") |
| 1999 | Wasteland | No | Co-producer | No | No | No | ABC | |
| 2006–09 | Kyle XY | No | Yes | Yes (8) | No | No | ABC Family | Producer (season 1, season 2: 3 episodes); Supervising producer (season 2: 20 episodes); Co-executive producer (season 3) |
| 2009–17 | The Vampire Diaries | Developer | Yes | Yes (31) | Yes | Yes | The CW | Co-executive producer (season 1: 15 episodes); Executive producer (145 episodes); Director (3 episodes) |
| 2013–18 | The Originals | Yes | No | Yes (11) | Yes | Yes | The CW | |
| 2013–14 | The Tomorrow People | Developer | No | No | Yes | No | The CW | Executive producer (17 episodes) |
| 2016 | Containment | Developer | No | Yes (3) | Yes | Yes | The CW | |
| 2016 | Recon | No | No | No | Yes | No | Fox | Unsold pilot |
| 2017 | Time After Time | No | No | No | No | No | AXN | Director (Episode: "You Will Find Me") |
| 2018 | Riverdale | No | No | No | No | No | The CW | Director (Episode: "Chapter Twenty-Six: The Tell Tale Heart") |
| 2018–22 | Legacies | Yes | No | Yes (6) | Yes | Yes | The CW | Director (2 episodes) |
| 2019–21 | Roswell, New Mexico | No | No | No | Yes | No | The CW | Executive producer (seasons 1–3); Director (2 episodes) |
| 2022 | Vampire Academy | Developer | No | Yes (1) | Yes | Yes | Peacock | Director |
| 2022 | The Endgame | No | No | No | Yes | No | NBC | |
| 2023 | The Girls on the Bus | Developer | No | Yes | Yes | Yes | Max | |
| 2025 | We Were Liars | Developer | No | Yes (1) | Yes | Yes | Amazon Prime Video | |
