= Kaylee Kaneshiro =

Japanese American actress

- Born: Kaylee Kaneshiro
- Other name: Kaylee Bryant
- Occupations: Actress; model
- Years active: 2011–present

Kaylee Kaneshiro (formerly credited as Kaylee Bryant) is an American actress and model. She is known for portraying Josie Saltzman on the CW television series Legacies.

== Biography ==
Kaneshiro grew up in Southern California. Due to her early career in modeling and acting, she was homeschooled for part of her upbringing and entered junior year in high school at the age of 15 years old. Kaneshiro is of 1/4 Japanese descent through her paternal grandfather, who is from Okinawa, and spoke Japanese while growing up. Kaneshiro publicly came out as queer in June 2021.

== Career ==
Kaneshiro began her career as a model when she was seven years old for clothing brands like Ralph Lauren walking runways and doing print ads. She began acting when she was eight years old and participated in children's theater. She went to appear on shows like American Horror Story, Santa Clarita Diet, The Real O'Neals, and Kickin' It among others. Her first lead role was in the 2014 independent film in Mary Loss of Soul.

In 2018, Kaneshiro was cast in The CW's supernatural drama series Legacies as Josie Saltzman, one of the series' starring roles, a role she portrayed on the show through its fourth season. In 2021, she was cast in the thriller film The Locksmith.

On November 30, 2023, she announced on Instagram that she would no longer be using the stage surname "Bryant" she'd chosen as an 11-year old, and would be henceforth go by her birthname "Kaylee Kaneshiro."

== Filmography ==
Television and film roles
Year	Title	Role	Notes
2011	American Horror Story	Zombie slut	1 episode
2012	Body of Proof	Musician	1 episode
2013	Dog with a Blog	Maddie	2 episodes
2013	A.N.T. Farm	Tina Garcetti	1 episode
2014	Suburgatory	Girl	1 episode
2012–2014	Kickin' It	Tori / Carrie	3 episodes
2014	Mary Loss of Soul	Mary Solis	Film
2015	News Readers	Madison Jordan	1 episode
2015	Backstrom	Amber	1 episode
2015	Double Daddy	Paula	Television film
2015	Chasing Life	Sydney	2 episodes
2016	The Real O'Neals	Lacey	3 episodes
2016	Criminal Minds	Amanda Bergstrom	1 episode
2016	What Goes Around Comes Around	Charlotte	Television film
2017	Speechless	India Hertzfled	1 episode
2017–2018	Santa Clarita Diet	Sarah	3 episodes
2018–2021	Legacies	Josie Saltzman	Main role (seasons 1–4)
2022	The Journey Ahead	Sarah	Television film
2023	The Locksmith	Tanya Saunders	Film
2024	Spin the Bottle	Kasey Stanton	Film
