= The Originals (TV series) =

2013 American supernatural drama television series

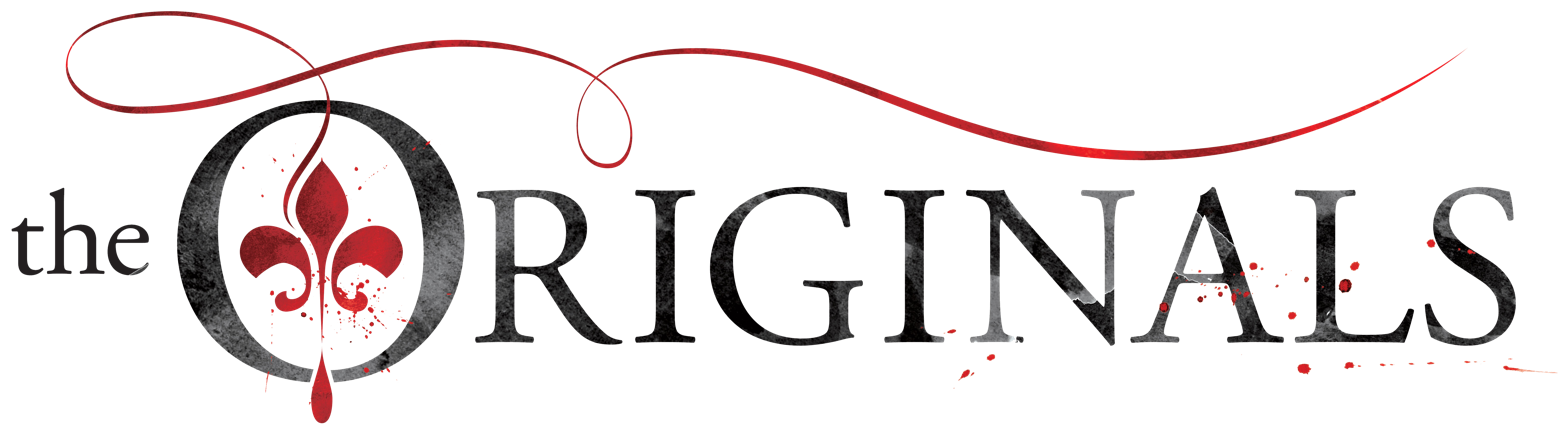
- Genre: Drama; Horror; Dark fantasy; Supernatural
- Created by: Julie Plec
- Based on: In part on character Klaus from The Vampire Diaries by L. J. Smith
- Starring: Joseph Morgan; Daniel Gillies; Claire Holt; Phoebe Tonkin; Charles Michael Davis; Daniella Pineda; Leah Pipes; Danielle Campbell; Yusuf Gatewood; Riley Voelkel; Danielle Rose Russell; Steven Krueger
- Composer: Michael Suby
- Country of origin: United States
- Original language: English
- No. of seasons: 5
- No. of episodes: 92 (list of episodes)

Production
- Executive producers: Julie Plec; Michael Narducci; Leslie Morgenstein; Gina Girolamo
- Cinematography: Michael Karasick; Darren Genet; John Smith; Datan Hopson; Rob C. Givens
- Running time: 40–42 minutes
- Production companies: My So-Called Company; Alloy Entertainment; CBS Television Studios; Bonanza Productions; Warner Bros. Television

Original release
- Network: The CW
- Release: October 3, 2013 – August 1, 2018

Related
- The Vampire Diaries; The Originals: The Awakening; Legacies

The Originals is an American supernatural drama television series. It is a spin-off of The Vampire Diaries and the first television series expansion of the franchise based on its parent series. The series follows vampire-werewolf hybrid Klaus Mikaelson as he and his family become embroiled in the supernatural politics of the French Quarter of New Orleans.

It began airing on the CW on October 3, 2013. On July 20, 2017, it was announced by series creator Julie Plec that the series' fifth season would be its last. The final season began airing in April 2018 and finished on August 1, 2018.

== Series overview ==
The Originals, a spin-off of The Vampire Diaries, centers on three of the Mikaelson siblings: Klaus, Elijah, and Rebekah. The Mikaelson family, also commonly known as "the Originals" because they are the first vampires ever to exist, born as witches from their mother Esther Mikaelson. Klaus is the son of a witch and a werewolf and an original vampire, and his quest to unleash his hybrid nature was detailed in The Vampire Diaries. He is the half-brother to his siblings, with Esther having had an affair with a werewolf. Hence he is a hybrid and the others are not. The other siblings are Mikael's children. The backdoor pilot, "The Originals", which aired on April 25, 2013, also revealed that the werewolf Hayley, with whom Klaus had a drunken one-night stand in season 4 of The Vampire Diaries, is pregnant with his child, the first ever tribrid. Elijah, Klaus, Rebekah and Hayley are all introduced in The Vampire Diaries, alongside Klaus' other siblings - Kol and Finn, and parents Esther and Mikael.

The series begins with the three Mikaelson siblings returning to the city of New Orleans for the first time since 1919, where a pregnant Hayley has also settled. She is under capture by the witches who use her pregnancy to manipulate Klaus into helping them against vampire Marcel's iron fist.

The Mikaelson siblings, having originally built the French Quarter, had been forced to abandon it when fleeing from their vengeful father, Mikael. He wished to kill them all and end the vampire species, which he viewed as unnatural and evil. In their absence, Klaus's former vampire protégé and adoptive son – and Rebekah's former lover – Marcel, took charge of the French Quarter as self-proclaimed king. Klaus resolves that they must take down Marcel and get back the city that once belonged to them, while also protecting their city from a war brewing between vampires, werewolves, and witches and the threat they pose to Klaus' unborn child.

The first season describes how Klaus' mystical child is going to be born and speaks of the threats that the Originals must keep her safe from. It also details the war between vampires, witches and werewolves in the French Quarter. The series ends with the child being born – a baby girl, named Hope by Klaus. She is given to Rebekah to hide and protect, after Klaus and Hayley fake the baby's death to ensure her safety after the witches seek to sacrifice her. Hayley is turned into the first unsired hybrid through Hope's blood after being murdered by the French Quarter witches after giving birth.

In the second season, the Mikaelson siblings face new threats from their past. Their parents, Mikael and Esther, return, and Dahlia, Esther’s sister, poses a serious danger to Hope, believing she is owed the first-born of every generation as they produce the most powerful witches. Kol and Finn Mikaelson also return in the bodies of witches, with Finn seeking to eradicate vampires and kill Hope. Dahlia intends to take and train Hope, just as she did with Freya—the supposedly dead firstborn daughter and witch of Mikael and Esther. It is revealed that Freya, as the firstborn, was secretly promised to Dahlia by Esther in return for fertility. Dahlia took Freya as her own. Now, seeking revenge, Freya allies with the Mikaelsons to defeat Dahlia, and cements herself in the family.

The third season begins with the return of Lucien Castle, the first vampire sired by Klaus. Lucien tells Klaus about a prophecy that speaks of the Mikaelsons' downfall through friend, foe and family. In an effort to battle the Mikaelsons, Lucien works with Tristan de Martel and his sister Aurora, Klaus' first love and the first vampires sired by Elijah and Rebekah respectively. This season sees the death of Hayley's werewolf husband Jackson by Tristan, as well as the death of Camille by Lucien and Davina's death. This season is also the first one to have a crossover episode with The Vampire Diaries season 7, with Stefan Salvatore coming to New Orleans seeking aid, running from vampire hunter Rayna Cruz.

The fourth season takes place five years after the third season following the downfall of the Mikaelsons. Marcel, now an Upgraded Original Vampire due to Lucien's creation, is ruling the city with an iron fist once more, while Hayley cures Freya, Elijah, Rebekah and Kol. Klaus meanwhile suffers at Marcel's hand as the other Mikealson siblings strive to save him. But the appearance of an evil ancient mystical menace, called the Hollow, puts them all at risk; especially Hope, now aged 7, who is targeted for her magical abilities and tribrid nature. Davina is resurrected, having died at the end of season 3 and leaves town with Kol. It is revealed later that the Hollow created the first werewolves, which Hayley descends from, the Crescent wolves, and is vulnerable to their blood. Hope is starting to develop magical abilities which Freya helps her control and use.

The fifth and final season of the series takes place seven years after the fourth season. Hope, now a 15-year-old teenager, is studying at the Salvatore School for the Young and Gifted, having enrolled at the end of season 4. The Mikaelson siblings are living their own lives separately, trying to keep the Hollow at bay through their distance, each hold 1/4 of it inside. Rebekah is with Marcel and Kol is married to Davina. But when Klaus and an amnesiac Elijah meet, Hayley is kidnapped and Nazi vampires emerge, the entire family returns to New Orleans to fight these new brewing threats. Hope also triggers her werewolf curse. This season acts as a soft backdoor pilot through small incorporations of the Salvatore School and future Legacies characters Alaric, Landon Kirby and the Saltzman twins. Season 5 also features Caroline Forbes, a past love interest of Klaus, co-founder of the Salvatore School and the twins mother.

== Cast and characters ==
- Joseph Morgan as Klaus Mikaelson: The self-proclaimed King of the French Quarter of New Orleans and the Original Hybrid: half-Original Vampire and half-werewolf. As the son of a witch and a werewolf alongside being a vampire by magic, Klaus is one of the most powerful and feared supernatural beings in history – he is over 1000 years old. He has a soft spot for his family, especially Rebekah and Hope, his daughter with Hayley. He is the adoptive father of Marcel, his former protégé whom he saved from slavery. He eventually develops feelings for Cami, a bartender and psychology student. The character is introduced in The Vampire Diaries season 2.
- Daniel Gillies as Elijah Mikaelson: An Original Vampire and Klaus's older maternal half-brother. He is shown to be extremely suave, always sporting a suit and level-headed, compared to Klaus's more heated tendencies. He is also known as the "Noble Brother", always promising his "word". He harbours deep romantic affections for Hayley, which she returns. The character is introduced in The Vampire Diaries season 2.
- Claire Holt as Rebekah Mikaelson (season 1; special guest star seasons 2–5): An Original Vampire and Klaus's younger maternal half-sister. She is Klaus's favourite sibling and the youngest of the Mikaelson siblings after the death of Henrik. The character is introduced in The Vampire Diaries season 3.
- Phoebe Tonkin as Hayley Marshall: Originally a werewolf, later a hybrid, who conceived a daughter with Klaus named Hope, following a one night stand in Mystic Falls, creating the first ever tribrid – witch (from Klaus' mother) Vampire/hybrid (from Klaus) and werewolf (from Hayley and Klaus). The character is introduced in The Vampire Diaries season 4.
- Charles Michael Davis as Marcel Gerard: A vampire and former slave. He was turned by Klaus, his adoptive father and former mentor. He has a romantic past with both Rebekah and Cami. His relationship with the Mikaelsons is complicated due to his history with them and philosophical differences. They are often adversarial as Klaus and Marcel constantly struggle for power over the French Quarter of New Orleans, but always care for one another. The character was introduced in The Vampire Diaries backdoor pilot.
- Daniella Pineda as Sophie Deveraux (season 1): A powerful witch of the French Quarter, Monique's aunt and Jane-Anne's sister. She kidnaps Hayley to use as leverage over the Mikaelson's. The character is introduced in The Vampire Diaries backdoor pilot.
- Leah Pipes as Cami O'Connell (seasons 1–3; special guest star seasons 4–5): A human bartender with a psychology degree who acts as a therapist and eventually becomes romantically involved with Klaus Mikaelson. For decades, her family has helped protect the human locals of the French Quarter from all things supernatural, with dark objects owned by Kol centuries ago. Before developing feelings for Klaus, Cami was in a relationship with Marcel. She is often the voice of reason for Klaus, and is his compelled therapist for a period of time. The character is introduced in The Vampire Diaries backdoor pilot.
- Danielle Campbell as Davina Claire (seasons 1–3; special guest star seasons 4–5): An extremely powerful orphan young harvest witch and Marcel's adoptive daughter who becomes Regent of all witch covens in New Orleans. She is 16 at the beginning of the series.
- Yusuf Gatewood as Vincent Griffith (seasons 2–5; guest star season 1): A witch once possessed by Finn, the eldest brother among the Mikaelson siblings. He is the ex-husband of Eva Sinclair, the witch Rebekah possessed, who was previously possessed by the Hollow.
- Riley Voelkel as Freya Mikaelson (seasons 3–5; recurring season 2): Klaus's long-lost maternal older half-sister and an immensely powerful and skilled thousand-year-old witch. She is the eldest of the Mikaelson siblings.
- Danielle Rose Russell as Hope Andrea Mikaelson (season 5): The teenage daughter of Klaus and Hayley and the Original Tribrid, an extremely powerful supernatural being holding the three-fold lineage of vampire, werewolf and witch. She is fifteen years old in season 5 and a student at the Salvatore School, struggling to cope with her family's legacy.
  - Young Hope is portrayed by Summer Fontana (recurring season 4, guest season 5).
  - Baby Hope is portrayed by uncredited infant actors in seasons 1–3.
- Steven Krueger as Josh Rosza (season 5; recurring seasons 1–4): A visitor college student to New Orleans who is soon turned into a vampire by Marcel. He is sarcastic but has a very strong sense of loyalty, friendship and love towards his friends.

== Episodes ==
Season	Episodes	Originally released	
Season	Episodes	First released	Last released
Pilot		April 25, 2013	
1	22	October 3, 2013	May 13, 2014
2	22	October 6, 2014	May 11, 2015
3	22	October 8, 2015	May 20, 2016
4	13	March 17, 2017	June 23, 2017
5	13	April 18, 2018	August 1, 2018

== Production ==
On January 11, 2013, it was announced that a backdoor pilot focused on the Originals, starring Joseph Morgan as Klaus and titled The Originals would air sometime in April for a potential series pick-up for the 2013–2014 season. On April 26, 2013, The Originals was confirmed for a full series. This second spin-off attempt would be overseen by Julie Plec, with no involvement by Kevin Williamson. The Originals was officially picked up by The CW on April 26, 2013, for the 2013–14 season. Season one of The Originals was set to premiere on Tuesday, October 15. However, on July 29, 2013, The CW announced that the series premiere would instead air on October 3, 2013, following the fifth-season premiere of The Vampire Diaries in order to attract fans of the series. On October 10, 2013, the CW ordered three additional scripts for the series. On November 11, 2013, the CW decided to order a full season for The Originals.

Following the March 11, 2014, episode, Claire Holt left the main cast. Holt confirmed that she would be returning to the show, but that she needed to spend time with her family first.

== Reception ==
=== Critical reception ===
Rotten Tomatoes assesses 87% positive reviews for the overall series, with the first season garnering 57% (of 28 reviews considered), while the following three all earn 100% (of 6, 6 and 5 reviews, respectively), and the final season scores 67% based on 6 reviews.

=== Ratings ===
Viewership and ratings per season of The Originals
Season	Timeslot (ET)	Episodes	First aired		Last aired		TV season	Viewership rank	Avg. viewers (millions)	18–49 rank	Avg. 18–49 rating
Season	Timeslot (ET)	Episodes	Date	Viewers (millions)	Date	Viewers (millions)	TV season	Viewership rank	Avg. viewers (millions)	18–49 rank	Avg. 18–49 rating
1	Tuesday 8:00 pm	22	October 3, 2013	2.21	May 13, 2014	1.76	2013–14	149	2.61	112	1.6/4
2	Monday 8:00 pm	22	October 6, 2014	1.37	May 11, 2015	1.19	2014–15	136	2.03	147	0.9/3
3	Thursday 9:00 pm (1–9); Friday 9:00 pm (10–22)	22	October 8, 2015	0.89	May 20, 2016	0.85	2015–16	145	1.96	163	0.6/2
4	Friday 8:00 pm	13	March 17, 2017	1.05	June 23, 2017	0.80	2016–17	141	1.37	TBD	0.3
5	Wednesday 9:00 pm	13	April 18, 2018	0.97	August 1, 2018	0.86	2017–18	151	1.36	155	0.6

=== Awards and nominations ===
Year	Award	Category	Nominee(s)	Result	Refs
2014	Emmy Awards	Outstanding Hairstyling For A Single-Camera Series	Colleen Labaff, Kimberley Spiteri	Nominated	
2014	People's Choice Awards	Favorite Actor in a New Series	Joseph Morgan	Won	
2014	People's Choice Awards	Favorite New TV Drama	The Originals	Nominated	
2014	Teen Choice Awards	Choice TV Actor Fantasy/Sci-Fi	Joseph Morgan	Nominated	
2014	Teen Choice Awards	Choice TV Actress Fantasy/Sci-Fi	Claire Holt	Nominated	
2015	Teen Choice Awards	Choice TV Actor Fantasy/Sci-Fi	Joseph Morgan	Nominated	
2016	Teen Choice Awards	Choice TV: Liplock	Joseph Morgan & Leah Pipes	Nominated	
2016	Teen Choice Awards	Choice TV Actor Fantasy/Sci-Fi	Joseph Morgan	Nominated	
2017	Teen Choice Awards	Choice TV Actor Fantasy/Sci-Fi	Joseph Morgan	Nominated	
2018	American Society of Cinematographers Awards	Outstanding Achievement in Cinematography in Regular Series for Commercial Television	Kurt Jones (Episode: "Bag of Cobras")	Nominated	
2018	People's Choice Awards	The Sci-Fi/Fantasy Show of 2018	The Originals	Nominated	
2018	Teen Choice Awards	Choice Fantasy/Sci-Fi Series	The Originals	Nominated	
2018	Teen Choice Awards	Choice TV Actor Fantasy/Sci-Fi	Joseph Morgan	Nominated	

== The Originals: The Awakening ==
In November 2014, a web series titled The Originals: The Awakening was released as the fourth show in the franchise. The series explores the character Kol Mikaelson and his relationships with his siblings. Flashing back to 1914, Kol is on a quest to form an alliance with the witches of the French Quarter. Awakening gives answers to some questions about Kol's past, including the origins of his rivalry with his family and the unique backstory he has with the New Orleans witches. Each webisode is approximately two minutes long. The series concluded on December 8, 2014. To date, The Originals: The Awakening is the only web series in The Vampire Diaries franchise.

== Novels ==
On January 27, 2015, the first book in a series of novels based on the show was released. The Rise, The Loss, and The Resurrection make up the three novels in The Originals series written by Julie Plec.

== Spin-off ==
In August 2017, it was announced that a spin-off focusing on Hope Mikaelson (Danielle Rose Russell), the daughter of Klaus and Hayley, was in development. Julie Plec, co-creator of The Vampire Diaries and creator of The Originals, wrote the script and is credited with creating the series. It was the third series in The Vampire Diaries universe. In January 2018, it was revealed that filming for the pilot would go into production in the second quarter of 2018. It was announced in March 2018 that the spin-off was in fact ordered to pilot, but instead of a traditional pilot, Plec would be delivering a fifteen-minute pilot presentation of the series to The CW. It was also announced that The Vampire Diaries veteran Matt Davis would star in the project along with Aria Shahghasemi, Quincy Fouse, Jenny Boyd, and Kaylee Bryant. Shahghasemi debuted in the fifth season of The Originals as Hope's human friend and romantic interest Landon who lives in Mystic Falls and works at the Mystic Grill.

On May 11, 2018, it was announced that the spin-off, titled Legacies, had been ordered to series for the 2018–19 season. The show centers around "a 17-year-old Hope, along with Alaric's twin daughters, and other young witches, vampires, and werewolves" as they come of age at the Salvatore Boarding School for the Young and Gifted. The show featured appearances from many characters from The Vampire Diaries, along with characters from The Originals. On May 12, 2022, it was reported that the fourth season would be its last.

== See also ==
- Vampire film
- List of vampire television series
