= The Vampire Diaries season 4 =

The Vampire Diaries
- Season 4
- Season 4 DVD cover
- Showrunner: Julie Plec
- Starring: Nina Dobrev; Paul Wesley; Ian Somerhalder; Steven R. McQueen; Kat Graham; Zach Roerig; Candice Accola; Michael Trevino; Joseph Morgan
- No. of episodes: 23

Release
- Original network: The CW
- Original release: October 11, 2012 – May 16, 2013

Season chronology
- ← Previous; Season 3 Next → Season 5

The Vampire Diaries, an American supernatural drama, was renewed for a fourth season by the CW network on May 3, 2012, seven days before the third season's finale. Unlike the previous seasons that aired in September, it premiered on October 11, 2012, to avoid competition from major television shows. The fourth season consisted of 23 episodes rather than the usual 22.

On January 11, 2013, it was announced that a back-door pilot focused on the Originals, titled The Originals, would air on April 25 in the hopes that that series was picked up. On April 26, 2013, The CW announced that The Originals, The Vampire Diaries' spin-off series, had been picked up for a full season slated to premiere in the fourth quarter of 2013.

On February 11, 2013, the CW renewed the series for a fifth season.

== Cast ==
=== Main ===
- Nina Dobrev as Elena Gilbert / Katherine Pierce
- Paul Wesley as Stefan Salvatore / Silas
- Ian Somerhalder as Damon Salvatore
- Steven R. McQueen as Jeremy Gilbert
- Kat Graham as Bonnie Bennett
- Zach Roerig as Matt Donovan
- Candice Accola as Caroline Forbes
- Michael Trevino as Tyler Lockwood
- Joseph Morgan as Klaus Mikaelson

=== Recurring ===
- Claire Holt as Rebekah Mikaelson
- David Alpay as Atticus Shane
- Grace Phipps as April Young
- Phoebe Tonkin as Hayley Marshall
- Marguerite MacIntyre as Liz Forbes
- Todd Williams as Connor Jordan
- Rick Worthy as Rudy Hopkins
- Nathaniel Buzolic as Kol Mikaelson
- Charlie Bewley as Galen Vaughn
- Susan Walters as Carol Lockwood
- Arielle Kebbel as Lexi Branson
- Daniel Gillies as Elijah Mikaelson

=== Special guest ===
- Jasmine Guy as Sheila Bennett

=== Guest ===
- Alyssa Diaz as Kim
- Matt Davis as Alaric Saltzman
- Torrey DeVitto as Meredith Fell
- Paul Telfer as Alexander
- Scott Parks as Silas
- Michael Reilly Burke as Pastor Young
- Camille Guaty as Caitlin Shane
- Cynthia Addai-Robinson as Aja
- Blake Hood as Dean
- Ser'Darius Blain as Chris
- Madeline Zima as Charlotte
- Adina Porter as Nandi LaMarche
- Persia White as Abby Bennett Wilson
- Charles Michael Davis as Marcel Gerard
- Daniella Pineda as Sophie Deveraux
- Leah Pipes as Camille O'Connell
- Callard Harris as Thierry Vanchure
- Eka Darville as Diego
- Malaya Rivera Drew as Jane-Anne Deveraux
- Lex Shontz as Deputy Adams (“Growing Pains” episode).

== Episodes ==
| No. overall | No. in season | Title | Directed by | Written by | Original release date | Prod. code | U.S. viewers (millions) |
|---|---|---|---|---|---|---|---|
| 67 | 1 | "Growing Pains" | Chris Grismer | Caroline Dries | October 11, 2012 | 2J6651 | 3.18 |
Elena completes her transformation into a vampire. Pastor Young takes over the Founders Council and kidnaps Caroline and Rebekah. Klaus leaves Tyler's body and is confronted by a hurt Rebekah, who destroys the bags of Elena's blood, making it impossible for Klaus to make more hybrids. Stefan gives Elena a daylight ring created by Bonnie. Pastor Young calls a meeting of the secret council on his farm and starts a gas leak in his kitchen and says "we are the beginning" before striking his lighter in the air and blowing everyone up.
| 68 | 2 | "Memorial" | Rob Hardy | Jose Molina & Julie Plec | October 18, 2012 | 2J6652 | 2.91 |
Vampire hunter Connor Jordon investigates the supernatural population of Mystic Falls under the ruse of investigating the explosion that killed the Council.
| 69 | 3 | "The Rager" | Lance Anderson | Brian Young | October 25, 2012 | 2J6653 | 2.87 |
The gang returns to school and Matt allows Elena to feed on him again. They discover that a curfew has been put into effect due to the shooting at the church. Stefan tries to show Elena that being a vampire can be fun. Rebekah throws an anti-curfew party at her house. Klaus discovers Connor is one of The Five, a clan of legendary vampire hunters that existed 900 years before.
| 70 | 4 | "The Five" | Joshua Butler | Brett Matthews & Rebecca Sonnenshine | November 1, 2012 | 2J6654 | 3.27 |
Klaus and Rebekah realize Connor is one of "The Five." Bonnie, Elena, and Damon meet Professor Shane, who appears to be a believer in the supernatural. At a party being thrown on campus, Damon teaches Elena how to feed properly. Stefan learns the "Ultimate Weapon" of The Five is a possible cure for vampirism. Connor escapes Klaus by killing one of his hybrids, and leaves to find the one who sent him to Mystic Falls in the first place: Professor Shane.
| 71 | 5 | "The Killer" | Chris Grismer | Michael Narducci | November 8, 2012 | 2J6655 | 3.02 |
After being told by Shane that the truth about his tattoo will be revealed, Connor returns to Mystic Falls, agreeing to kill humans if necessary. Stefan and Klaus team up once again to stop Connor, but Klaus leaves to find Alexander's sword. Connor takes Jeremy, Matt and April hostage. April who doesn't know of vampires yet, and so thinks Connor is delusional and is naturally scared of him. Stefan and Damon argue on the best course of action. Damon is knocked unconscious and the situation turns violent when one of Klaus's minions is sent to stand up to Connor. Meanwhile, Shane is trying to get Bonnie to get over her guilt via hypnosis, which at first appears not to work when he tries to get her to light a single candle, but when Bonnie opens her eyes she sees she lit every candle in the room. Jeremy tries to talk to Connor, who explains a friend of his was once turned into a vampire but he had to put that friend down, and then the tattoo began to appear. Elena breaks in and attacks Connor, but he is taken away by Stefan. Damon catches up to them and confronts Stefan on why he doesn't kill Connor and he explains Connor is the key to a cure. When Connor makes a run for it, the brothers witness him being killed by Elena, much to her guilt.
| 72 | 6 | "We All Go a Little Mad Sometimes" | Wendey Stanzler | Evan Bleiweiss & Julie Plec | November 15, 2012 | 2J6656 | 2.84 |
Elena is hallucinating about the death of Connor, which is slowly driving her mad. Klaus informs the Salvatore brothers that Elena needs to be locked away, because eventually she will try to kill herself. After stealing her away from the brothers, he explains that due to killing the original five hunters, he experienced the same thing and there is no cure. Meanwhile, Shane is hosting an exhibition at the school with Bonnie's help. Damon and Bonnie turn to him for answers. He tells them that Elena's hallucinations are due to a witch's curse and the only cure is for a potential hunter to make a first kill and pass along the last hunter's powers. Jeremy has discovered the beginnings of the mark on him. Stefan goes to break Elena out only to have her attack him and escape. She goes to the bridge where she died and the hunter, Katherine, and her mother convince her to take her own life. She drops her daylight ring into the water. Stefan sends Damon to bring her back. Klaus provides Jeremy with one of his hybrids to kill to complete his transition to a hunter and break the curse in return for a single date with Caroline. This causes tension between Caroline and Tyler, not just because of her having a date with Klaus but also because in Tyler's eyes "[Caroline] sacrificed one friend for another." He feels as if he's the only one in the group that considers the hybrids' safety. The curse is broken just as dawn comes, and Damon saves Elena by throwing them both in the river. He tells Elena that Stefan had been lying to them, but it was all for her. Stefan and Elena sit on the front steps and talk. Elena admits that as a vampire, her feelings for Damon have been magnified, and Stefan tells her he can't do this any more so they mutually decide to split up.
| 73 | 7 | "My Brother's Keeper" | Jeffrey Hunt | Caroline Dries & Elisabeth R. Finch | November 29, 2012 | 2J6657 | 2.86 |
The Miss Mystic Falls pageant is back, and Elena and Caroline help April find something to wear. Meanwhile, Caroline calls Stefan and Stefan tells Caroline about Elena's feelings for Damon, which Caroline objects to. Klaus shows up shortly afterwards, questioning Stefan's trust in him. Damon and Stefan's relationship is even more strained, but they continue their search for the cure to vampirism for Elena's sake. Caroline and Elena are suspicious of Shane, who Damon decides to confront. Ever since awakening as a hunter, Jeremy has been having nightmares in which he kills Elena. Stefan uses criminals to create vampires for Jeremy to use to complete his tattoo. Hayley and Tyler work to break the sire bond of Klaus' hybrids. Caroline is stressed by a favor she owes Klaus- a date, which Klaus convinces Caroline to let him escort her to the Miss Mystic Pageant. Klaus manipulates her into feeling jealous of Hayley and Tyler's friendship, while also charming her. She asks if he ever wanted to be human again, and Klaus shares with her that he considered being human momentarily while looking at a hummingbird and contemplated the fragility of mortality and how struggling to stay alive would make every day you're living that much more meaningful. Caroline bonds with Klaus as Tyler jealously looks on with Hayley. Jeremy's hunter instinct- a hatred of vampires- develops to the point that he attacks Stefan. Damon asks why Shane showed up in Mystic Falls in the first place causing Shane to reveal that he is a vampire. Jeremy arrives at the pageant and attacks Elena, nearly killing her. She is rescued by Stefan and Matt. Stefan reveals to Elena he provided vampires for Jeremy to kill, to which she replies that she doesn't want her humanity back if it costs her brother his. Matt moves into her house and Elena decides to stay in the Salvatore House. Stefan then decides to leave, unable to stay in the same house as Elena. It is eventually revealed that Shane and Hayley are working together to break the sire bond with Klaus's hybrids. Later, Elena has a talk with Damon, which leads to a dance between the two and passionate sex afterwards, all while Caroline and Stefan figure out that Elena is sired to Damon.
| 74 | 8 | "We'll Always Have Bourbon Street" | Jesse Warn | Charlie Charbonneau & Jose Molina | December 6, 2012 | 2J6658 | 2.42 |
After Elena and Damon wake up and continue where they left off the night before, Stefan arrives to the Salvatore house and approaches Damon with the suspicion that Elena is sired to him. Stefan advises Damon to ask Elena to try to drink from a blood bag again and see if she can keep it down, since he believes the only reason she can only drink straight from a vein is because Damon told her so. He tries and discovers that not only can she keep the blood down, she enjoys it. Damon decides to help Stefan investigate the sire bond in New Orleans, Louisiana hoping to find a former flame of Damon's who was also sired to him. While the Salvatore brothers are out of town, Elena, Caroline and Bonnie share a girls night, but an argument quickly ensues when Caroline starts criticizing Damon. When Caroline gets angry at Elena's stubbornness and her obvious devotion to Damon, Elena reveals that she and Damon slept together, which leads to Caroline telling Elena that she is sired to Damon. Meanwhile, at Hayley's urging, Tyler confronts one of Klaus's hybrids, Kimberly, and the situation quickly escalates into violence when the hybrids start fighting over who takes the pack-leader role. Kimberly then captures Caroline to try to prove that she is the leader. Tyler and Elena save Caroline, causing the other hybrids (including Kimberly) to accept Tyler as their leader. While in New Orleans, a witch tells Damon that the only way to break a sire bond is by telling the sired vampire to forget they ever existed and move on with their life. The witch also reveals that a vampire only becomes sired to their maker when they have human feelings for their maker before they are turned. Damon knows he has to do the right thing with Elena and decides to tell her to move on, but when he approaches Elena with this final instruction, Elena realizes that he wants to break things off and tries to convince him that her feelings are as real as she believes they are, and that the sire bond only affects the way she acts. Also in the episode, we find out that Professor Shane is teaching Bonnie a type of magic called "expression," which the witch in New Orleans called more evil than dark magic; that other witches don't even call it magic at all.
| 75 | 9 | "O Come, All Ye Faithful" | Pascal Verschooris | Michael J. Cinquemani & Julie Plec | December 13, 2012 | 2J6659 | 2.81 |
A winter-themed party takes place in Mystic Falls, but amongst the celebration Caroline and Stefan argue with Tyler over what to do with Klaus and his hybrids. Stefan breaks into Klaus's house and attempts to steal Alexander the hunter's sword while Caroline once again plays "the distraction" to Klaus at the winter party. She comments on the piece of art Klaus donated for display, telling him honestly that it feels "lonely" to her. Meanwhile, Elena and Damon go to the Gilbert Lake House to help Jeremy face some dangerous inner demons with the help of Bonnie and Professor Shane, who shares that he knows where to find the cure to vampirism. When Hayley snaps Caroline's neck, to save her and Professor Shane's plan, April finds Caroline "Dead." April finds out about the supernatural things happening in Mystic Falls and that Rebekah is daggered in the Lockwood cellar. Finally, Klaus discovers Tyler's plan which leads to all 12 of the hybrids being killed and Klaus drowning Tyler's mother.
| 76 | 10 | "After School Special" | David Von Ancken | Brett Matthews | January 17, 2013 | 2J6660 | 2.95 |
Following Carol's death, Bonnie's father steps in as the new mayor and shows concern about Bonnie. Meanwhile, Rebekah and April work together to get Elena to speak to Rebekah, trapping Elena in the library. Stefan is called to rescue Elena, and he calls Caroline for back up. Both are tricked and locked into the library with Elena, although Rebekah allows April to leave. Meanwhile, Matt and Damon continue training Jeremy to expand the hunters mark. Klaus gets impatient and Damon shoots him several times for killing Carol. Regardless, Klaus offers to provide vampires for Jeremy to kill starting with a pizza delivery woman; who attacks them, forcing Jeremy to kill her. Bonnie talks to Shane, who gives her an amulet made from human bone. Kol soon shows up and abducts Shane, taking him to the school's library. Rebekah talks to them about the cure and, more personally, to Elena about her break up with Stefan and her feelings for Damon, in an effort to torment Stefan. Tyler gets a call from Rebekah to rescue his friends. Kol brings in Shane and torture him about the location of the cure, who tells him and Rebekah about Silas, and how he intends to release him, and how Silas will resurrect those who died on his behalf. Rebekah refuses to listen and Kol attempts to drown Shane, then impales him, but Bonnie manages to put a protection spell on Shane. April suffers from the spell due to a link between her and Shane. Tyler arrives and Rebekah orders him to turn. As Tyler begins to transform, he tells his friends to run for it. As they do, Stefan finds an unconscious April with Bonnie and manages to revive her, telling Bonnie to get her out. Rebekah walks up to Elena and Stefan and offers to erase Stefan's memories of Elena, but when he accepts, Rebekah goes back on her word; saying that Stefan's pain is her own revenge. At the end of the episode, April talks to the sheriff and the mayor, revealing that she knows about the supernatural and everyone's lies. Damon and Elena talk on the phone and Elena says that sire bond or not, she loves him. Damon being happy tells Elena to come to him. Rebekah comes to Stefan after he calls her and admits that she still wants the cure so she can use it on Klaus, they agree to work together. Klaus calls Jeremy, Matt, and Damon to a bar, full of people transforming into vampires.
| 77 | 11 | "Catch Me If You Can" | John Dahl | Brian Young & Michael Narducci | January 24, 2013 | 2J6661 | 2.71 |
The episode begins at the bar, where Jeremy refuses to kill the new vampires. Klaus threatens to compel them to attack Matt in order to force Jeremy to kill them. Matt is injured and he and Jeremy run for it. They are attacked by the vampires before Elena's intervention. They make it back to the lake house. The next day Elena scolds Damon for using innocent people. They realize the vampires will return and Damon says Jeremy finishing the job will be necessary. Rebekah visits Stefan, telling him she has a plan; to steal Silas' headstone, forcing Shane to join forces with them. Sheriff Forbes arrives and arrests Shane. Damon and Jeremy head back to the bar and find the vampires have already been killed by Kol. Kol tells them that long ago he killed a cult that worshipped Silas, and how he can't allow Silas to awaken. Kol attempts to rip Jeremy's arm off but gets into a fight with Damon. Bonnie and her father talk to each other, and he tells her that Shane is the type of person who manipulates the weak minded. Shane talks to Bonnie in the interrogation room and he confesses to the mass murder that occurred over the season's course. Elena goes to Klaus, asking him to call off Kol's attack. She reminds him that they both want the cure, and Klaus calmly calls Kol off, warning him to stay away from Jeremy. Regardless, Kol tortures Damon and compels him into hunting Jeremy. In Shane's study, Rebekah and Stefan look for the headstone, and talk about their old relationship. Rebekah says they had fun, but they didn't care; so Rebekah tells him to stop caring. A man walks into Shane's study room but is cornered by Rebekah. Meanwhile, Bonnie calls Shane out for the mass murder, but Shane tells her that Silas will resurrect the murder victims. Bonnie refuses to listen before Shane reminds her of her grandmother, and that she can see her again. Afterwards, Shane tells Bonnie's father that she could be the most powerful witch on earth, or a time bomb. Soon, Damon goes to the bar where Matt works and Jeremy is there. Jeremy runs into an isolated room and Damon tells Elena Kol ordered him to kill Jeremy. Jeremy finds a hidden cave, Damon follows him, warning that he is out to get him and tells him to run away. In Shane's study, Rebekah tortures the man, only for him to spit out his tongue and kill himself. Elena calls Stefan, asking for his help, but he doesn't seem to listen. Damon corners Jeremy, who shoots him in the head, giving Jeremy a head start. Kol heads back into town and meets with Rebekah, who tries to dagger him, but Kol has the white ash dagger and is stopped by Klaus. Back at the chase, which is now in a forest, Elena tries to use her feelings to get Damon to ignore the compulsion. It doesn't work, but he stops when Stefan subdues him. He takes Damon back to the Salvatore house, where he locks Damon up. He says once Elena is cured and Damon is un-compelled, then they can do what they want. Elena shows up and Stefan says she can't see Damon. Elena tells him he's hurt, that's why he's acting out, but Stefan tells her that he just isn't in love with her any more. Bonnie has dinner with her father, who says he's getting her help. Stefan goes to see Rebekah asking about the headstone but she changes the subject; asking if he's over Elena. He says yes and has sex with Rebekah. Klaus shows up at the Gilbert house, saying he intends to take Jeremy with him, insisting only he can protect Jeremy from Kol. They refuse, and Elena works on a plan to kill Kol.
| 78 | 12 | "A View to a Kill" | Brad Turner | Rebecca Sonnenshine | January 31, 2013 | 2J6662 | 2.56 |
Stefan wakes up not really sure of where he is until he glances around. It becomes obvious to him that he spent the night with Rebekah. He quietly dresses and plans to leave without her knowing it, but when he opens the door to leave, Klaus is there. Klaus makes an offer to Rebekah to help him stop Kol and protect Jeremy and when she refuses he turns to Stefan for help. Mayor Hopkins' unconventional way of ending the violence sends his daughter further away from him, then she has an angry meeting with Kol followed by an unexpected visitor, Bonnie's mother. Klaus complicates matters between Damon and Stefan by revealing a bit of Stefan's personal life and then surprises Damon by asking for advice. Elena tells Stefan about her dangerous plan for Jeremy which leaves him in a difficult spot. When the 1980s decade dance is cancelled Stefan finds a charming way to make it up to Rebekah. Kol is finally staked by Jeremy at the end of the episode. Later, knowing about Elena's plan to kill his brother, Klaus wants to hurt her and Jeremy. Bonnie arrives and puts a spell on Klaus that will lock him in the Gilbert's living room until the next full moon. Stefan informs the others that he has not stabbed Rebekah and that she is on their side and can be trusted which leaves Elena furious. Finally after Jeremy killed Kol, his tattoo is now completed and everyone is ready to go search for the cure.
| 79 | 13 | "Into the Wild" | Michael Allowitz | Caroline Dries | February 7, 2013 | 2J6663 | 2.50 |
Shane leads an expedition to a desolate island off the coast of Nova Scotia, where he believes the secret of the cure lies hidden. On the trek to the island's interior, Rebekah and Elena continue their bitter rivalry, Stefan does his best to keep the peace, and Damon accuses Shane of leading them into a trap. Bonnie and Jeremy try to figure out the message of the Hunter's mark, while Shane reveals more of the legend of Silas and the witch Qetsiyah, along with his own personal history. Back in Mystic Falls, Tyler confronts Klaus, and Caroline is caught up in the violence that follows.
| 80 | 14 | "Down the Rabbit Hole" | Chris Grismer | Jose Molina | February 14, 2013 | 2J6664 | 2.31 |
Back in Mystic Falls, Caroline and Tyler find that their attempt to translate the code on the Hunter's Sword is futile without help from Klaus, who has his own reasons for solving the puzzle. On the island, Damon has an ugly run-in with a Hunter named Vaughn (guest star Charlie Bewley), and realizes he is one of The Five. Stefan confesses his true feelings about the possibility of becoming human again to Elena. When a stunning new piece of information about the cure is suddenly revealed (there's only enough for one person), it changes the stakes for everyone. Jeremy helps Bonnie recognize what is real and what is an illusion, and Shane is comforted by his deceased wife. Katherine makes an appearance and forces Jeremy to feed Silas in order get the cure that is fossilized with his body. Silas ends up draining Jeremy's body and breaks his neck, killing him.
| 81 | 15 | "Stand by Me" | Lance Anderson | Julie Plec | February 21, 2013 | 2J6665 | 2.91 |
After much denial, Elena realizes that Jeremy is truly dead. Bonnie agrees to help Shane by killing twelve more people to get the proper magic needed to break the veil between this realm and where all supernatural beings go when they die. If this veil is broken successfully, every supernatural being that has died will come back to life. Also, with the veil broken, Silas will no longer be trapped on the otherside when he dies, thus finally being able to be reunited with his true love. When Bonnie tells everyone about her plans, they all tell her it is a terrible idea. Caroline tries to reach Tyler but is unsuccessful. Matt has a hard time with Jeremy's death. Rebekah leaves Vaughn to die in a cave after he warns her that no one is safe from Silas. Damon makes Elena shut off her humanity because the pain of losing Jeremy is too much for her. After she flips the switch, Elena burns down the Gilbert house as a cover story for Jeremy's death. Disguised as Shane, Silas returns to Mystic Falls with the group.
| 82 | 16 | "Bring It On" | Jesse Warn | Elisabeth R. Finch & Michael Narducci | March 14, 2013 | 2J6666 | 2.41 |
Elena's new outlook has everyone concerned, leading Stefan and Damon to agree that going back to the normal routine of high school would be the best thing for her. Caroline is pleasantly surprised when Elena decides to rejoin the cheerleading squad, but her pleasure turns to shock when Elena's behavior proves dangerous. Not giving up on their search for the cure, Damon and Rebekah work together until his unwanted advice catches her off-guard. Klaus tries to use Hayley to get the information he's after and makes an intriguing discovery in the process. Meanwhile, a bored Elena throws a wild party and gets into a big fight. Realizing that Elena needs some time away from Mystic Falls, Damon takes her to New York City, where he lived and partied in the 1970s.
| 83 | 17 | "Because the Night" | Garreth Stover | Brian Young & Charlie Charbonneau | March 21, 2013 | 2J6667 | 2.65 |
Damon is looking for Katherine to get the cure. Damon thinks that Elena is oblivious to that fact, but she is actually trying to get to the cure as well. When Rebekah also shows up in New York, she's impressed with Elena's secret agenda of getting the cure. Flashbacks reveal Damon's hedonistic life in the underground club scene and a complicated encounter with Lexi, where Lexi tried to get Damon to flip the switch like she did with Stefan before. Damon also briefs Elena with his experience with Lexi in New York and tries to convince her to flip the switch as well. Meanwhile, Caroline and Stefan try to convince Klaus that it would be in his own best interest to help them track down Silas. They team up and try to figure out Silas's next move. They find out that the last massacre has to be involved with witches. Silas is still trying to convince Bonnie to do the last massacre. Bonnie is hesitant, but Silas reminds her that when the third massacre is performed, all supernatural creatures that died come back to life. So Bonnie decides to perform the massacre. Stefan, Klaus and Caroline look for the location and find it. The twelve witches try to save Bonnie from the use of dark magic, but they find out Silas has control of her. So they try to kill her with a knife, but Caroline takes the knife and stabs the witch who is connected with eleven other witches. All twelve witches die, completing the massacre and Bonnie faints. While in New York, Elena attempts to take away a paper Damon found to track down Katherine. She tries to grab it while seducing him, but Damon catches her by revealing he used the same trick. He confides that it took a while but he finally got Lexi to let her guard down and re-enforced the door and locked her outside in daylight. Lexi has no choice, but to hide in the shade. So Damon runs away and confesses that he felt guilty after and still does. But while talking, Rebekah breaks his neck and they take the paper and go. Bonnie wakes up and her memory after the cave is gone. Silas bribes Klaus to help him, threatening to kill him with a white-oak stake he stole from Rebekah. Elena and Rebekah steal Damon's car and search for Katherine.
| 84 | 18 | "American Gothic" | Kellie Cyrus | Evan Bleiweiss & Jose Molina | March 28, 2013 | 2J6668 | 2.46 |
Rebekah and Elena find Katherine in Willoughby, PA, where Katherine has compelled the entire town. While Elena pretends to be Katherine with Elijah, Rebekah keeps an eye on Katherine. Soon, Stefan and Damon arrive. Rebekah and Damon go with Katherine to her house to get the cure. While Rebekah searches the house, Damon finds that the cure is contained in a fish tank filled with vervain water. Katherine dunks Damon's head in the water and temporarily incapacitates him. Katherine distracts Rebekah by tossing the cure into the air and making a run for it. Damon, still weak from the vervain, tries to convince Rebekah not to take the cure, but Rebekah tells him to give her one good reason why he wants Elena to take it. Damon does not answer. Rebekah drinks from the vial, just as Stefan arrives too late, and loses consciousness. When she awakens, even though she states that she feels human, she quickly learns that she is still a vampire and that Katherine tricked them. Later, Rebekah meets with Elijah and asks him to give her the cure stating that she wants to be human. Klaus then calls her and asks about her progress. She gives the phone to Elijah, who tells Klaus that he has the cure and is on his way back to Mystic Falls. Rebekah and Elijah leave together.
| 85 | 19 | "Pictures of You" | J. Miller Tobin | Neil Reynolds & Caroline Dries | April 18, 2013 | 2J6669 | 2.14 |
It is prom time in Mystic Falls. Elena steals Caroline's dress and the Salvatore brothers try to flip Elena's switch by walking her through memories. Caroline's dream prom doesn't go so well until Tyler returns (which would be his final appearance in this season). Rebekah insists on taking the cure to which Elijah asks her to pass one day without any vampire powers. Silas impersonates Jeremy to try to convince Bonnie to use her magic to drop the veil. Elena attacks April at the prom so Rebekah has to feed her blood to April because she chooses to be good over standing to Elijah's condition. Elena attacks Bonnie to try to keep Silas from dropping the veil to the Other Side, but Bonnie almost kills her. The Salvatore brothers stop her and vervain Elena, locking her up afterwards. Silas impersonates Rebekah and takes the cure from Elijah. Bonnie goes to see Silas and she asks to see his true face.
| 86 | 20 | "The Originals" | Chris Grismer | Julie Plec | April 25, 2013 | 2J6670 | 2.24 |
Klaus, at Katherine's suggestion, returns to his former home of New Orleans to find a witch with ties to him. He instead finds a former protégé, Marcel, ruling the city with an iron fist. As Klaus continues his search, he finds that the witches who live there are trying to overthrow Marcel and that they plan to use Hayley, who is carrying Klaus' child, in their plans. After Elijah arrives to help and persuades him to stay, Klaus decides return the city to his command with his brother by his side. Rebekah is offered a spot in Klaus' new domain, but she turns them down. In Mystic Falls, Damon and Stefan begin extreme measures to return Elena's humanity by imprisoning her in the basement of the Salvatore house.
| 87 | 21 | "She's Come Undone" | Darnell Martin | Michael Narducci & Rebecca Sonnenshine | May 2, 2013 | 2J6671 | 2.17 |
Damon and Stefan try a brutal new approach to provoke Elena into turning her humanity back on, and Caroline is frustrated when her attempt to intervene backfires and Elena attempts to kill her. When Elena figures out a way to call the Salvatore brothers' bluff, they call on Katherine to create real fear. Katherine has a go, pushing her hand into Elena and grabbing her heart. Then she deliberately leaves the door unlocked so that Elena can escape. Matt gives Rebekah some unsolicited advice on her life choices, and she tries to help him in return. Caroline has a confusing and dangerous encounter with Klaus, who turns out to be Silas looking for Bonnie. Silas is persistent, and mortally injures Caroline's mother to take her place. Bonnie reaffirms her promise to help Silas open the veil to purgatory, and Caroline has to inject some of her blood into her mother to bring her back to life. Katherine is suspicious when Bonnie makes her the offer of Silas's immortality and invulnerability in exchange for the tombstone that Katherine took from the island, which Bonnie needs to lift the veil between our world and purgatory. Katherine appears to accept the deal. Meanwhile, the Salvatore brothers use Matt to switch on Elena's humanity, with Damon snapping Matt's neck in front of Elena. He is, of course, wearing the ring that protects him from being killed by supernatural beings, and recovers in the presence of Rebekah. Elena decides that she is going to kill Katherine.
| 88 | 22 | "The Walking Dead" | Rob Hardy | Brian Young & Caroline Dries | May 9, 2013 | 2J6672 | 2.28 |
As graduation approaches, Caroline tries to distract Elena by focusing on simple tasks like sending out announcements about graduation, but Elena won't be swayed from her new obsession. Sheriff Forbes calls Damon and Stefan to the hospital, where someone has been attacking patients. Still trying to force Katherine to help her, Bonnie refuses to give up on her plan to defeat Silas. As a violent wind storm causes a power outage in Mystic Falls, ghosts suddenly appear some with good intentions and some bent on revenge. Bonnie turns Silas into stone and dies trying to bring Jeremy back to life.
| 89 | 23 | "Graduation" | Chris Grismer | Caroline Dries & Julie Plec | May 16, 2013 | 2J6673 | 2.24 |
On Graduation Day, Mystic Falls is overrun with ghosts intent on settling old scores and fulfilling their supernatural destinies. Damon's life is in danger the hunters come back and shoot him with bullets laced with werewolf venom. Matt and Rebekah are caught by Rebekah's ex-boyfriend hunter determined to find the cure. Determined to save Matt, Rebekah kisses him and says that it was thing she feared the most. As Elena, Stefan, Caroline, Bonnie and Matt gather for the graduation ceremony and the ghosts converge, help comes from the now-hero Klaus, after Caroline repeatedly calls him to help. Elena tells Stefan she wants him to have the cure instead of her, but later, we find out he denies her and gives the cure back to her. Caroline receives a touching and unexpected graduation present from Klaus: He gives Tyler his freedom back, allowing him to return to Mystic Falls to be with Caroline. Klaus then tells her that though Tyler is her first love, he intends to be her last. Then Bonnie bravely gives her own life to bring Jeremy back but ensures she'll be fine with her Grams, and the Spirits of Witches. Elena then tells Damon that she loves him and in death he is the only one who makes her feel alive. They kiss passionately as Stefan overhears the conversation with tears in his eyes. Stefan drives off to dump Silas' body with Lexi. The veil drops again and the ghosts all disappear. Jeremy says good-bye to Bonnie, but they quickly realize Jeremy is now alive and Bonnie isn't. Rebekah goes to see Matt and they decide to go on a summer road trip together to see the world. Elena faces Katherine which eventually leads to Elena shoving the cure down Katherine's throat, turning her back into a human. Finally, Stefan discovers a horrifying clue to the mystery surrounding Silas: Stefan is Silas' doppelganger. Then a vengeful Silas traps Stefan in a safe and drops him into the lake.

== Production ==
On May 3, 2012 The CW renewed The Vampire Diaries for a fourth season. Unlike previous seasons, it started on October 11. Kevin Williamson, Julie Plec, Leslie Morgenstein and Bob Levy were executive producers for the series. The season was concluded on May 16, 2013.

=== Casting ===
On August 7, 2012 it was announced that Phoebe Tonkin and Todd Williams would join the show as recurring characters in the fourth season. Tonkin portrayed Hayley Marshall, a friend of Tyler's. Williams portrayed Connor, a vampire hunter.

The Olympic gymnast Gabby Douglas made an appearance in "My Brother's Keeper" as a volunteer decorator for the Miss Mystic Falls Beauty Pageant. On the CW website, an interview with Douglas shares her experience on set and with the cast.

Starting with episode 13, Charlie Bewley will join the show as Vaughn, like Connor a vampire hunter, and Camille Guaty as Professor Shane's dead wife Caitlin, who is going to reveal information about him.

In February 2013, it was announced that Daniella Pineda was cast as the witch Sophie for episode 20 "The Originals". This episode serves as a backdoor-pilot for a possible spin-off series, revolving around the Originals and taking place in the French Quarter of New Orleans.

== Reception ==
=== Critical response ===
Based on 16 reviews, the fourth season holds a 69% on Rotten Tomatoes with an average rating of 7.81 out of 10. The site's critics' consensus reads, "Vampire Diaries gets the best out of star Nina Dobrev, but could use some fresh blood on the page as plotlines struggle to move the series forward."

=== Ratings ===
| No. | Title | Air date | 18–49 rating (Live + SD) | Viewers increase (millions) | Total 18–49 increase | Total viewers (millions) | Ref |
|---|---|---|---|---|---|---|---|
| 1 | "Growing Pains" | October 12, 2012 | 1.6 | 0.95 | 2.1 | 4.43 | |
| 2 | "Memorial" | October 19, 2012 | 1.3 | 1.33 | 1.9 | 4.24 | |
| 3 | "The Rager" | October 26, 2012 | 1.3 | 1.54 | 2.0 | 4.41 | |
| 4 | "The Five" | November 1, 2012 | 1.5 | 1.20 | 2.1 | 4.47 | |
| 5 | "The Killer" | November 8, 2012 | 1.5 | 1.05 | 1.9 | 4.07 | |
| 6 | "We All Go a Little Mad Sometimes" | November 15, 2012 | 1.3 | 1.19 | 1.7 | 4.03 | |
| 7 | "My Brother's Keeper" | November 29, 2012 | 1.4 | 1.43 | 2.1 | 4.29 | |
| 8 | "We'll Always Have Bourbon Street" | December 6, 2012 | 1.2 | 1.21 | 1.8 | 3.63 | |
| 9 | "O Come, All Ye Faithful" | December 13, 2012 | 1.3 | 1.51 | 2.0 | 4.32 | |
| 10 | "After School Special" | January 17, 2013 | 1.4 | 1.26 | 2.0 | 4.21 | |
| 11 | "Catch Me If You Can" | January 24, 2013 | 1.3 | 1.46 | 2.0 | 4.17 | |
| 12 | "A View To Kill" | January 31, 2013 | 1.3 | 1.17 | 1.9 | 3.73 | |
| 13 | "Into The Wild" | February 7, 2013 | 1.1 | 1.60 | 1.8 | 4.10 | |
| 14 | "Down the Rabbit Hole" | February 14, 2013 | 1.0 | 1.84 | 1.8 | 4.15 | |
| 15 | "Stand by Me" | February 21, 2013 | 1.3 | 1.57 | 2.0 | 4.48 | |
| 16 | "Bring It On" | March 14, 2013 | 1.1 | 1.16 | 1.8 | 3.60 | |
| 17 | "Because the Night" | March 21, 2013 | 1.3 | 1.21 | 1.9 | 3.86 | |
| 18 | "American Gothic" | March 28, 2013 | 1.2 | 1.23 | 1.8 | 3.69 | |
| 19 | "Pictures of You" | April 18, 2013 | 1.0 | 1.14 | 1.6 | 3.28 | |
| 20 | "The Originals" | April 25, 2013 | 1.0 | 1.34 | 1.6 | 3.58 | |
| 21 | "She's Come Undone" | May 2, 2013 | 1.0 | 1.30 | 1.6 | 3.47 | |
| 22 | "The Walking Dead" | May 9, 2013 | 1.0 | 1.36 | 1.6 | 3.64 | |
| 23 | "Graduation" | May 16, 2013 | 1.1 | 1.23 | 1.7 | 3.47 | |
