= O Come, All Ye Faithful (The Vampire Diaries) =

- The Vampire Diaries episode
- Episode no.: Season 4 Episode 9
- Directed by: Pascal Verschooris
- Written by: Michael J. Cinquemani; Julie Plec
- Cinematography by: Dave Perkal
- Editing by: Nathan Easterling
- Production code: 2J6659
- Original air date: December 13, 2012

Guest appearances
- Claire Holt as Rebekah Mikaelson; Susan Walters as Carol Lockwood; Grace Phipps as April Young; Phoebe Tonkin as Hayley Marshall; David Alpay as Atticus Shane; Alyssa Diaz as Kimberley

Episode chronology
← Previous "We'll Always Have Bourbon Street"	Next → "After School Special"
- The Vampire Diaries season 4

"O Come, All Ye Faithful" is the ninth episode of the fourth season of the American supernatural teen drama television series The Vampire Diaries, and the 75th of the series. It aired on The CW on December 13, 2012. The episode was written by executive story editor Michael J. Cinquemani and series co-developer Julie Plec, and directed by producer Pascal Verschooris.

== Plot ==
A winter-themed party takes place in Mystic Falls, but during the celebration Caroline and Stefan argue with Tyler over what to do with Klaus and his hybrids. Elena and Damon wake up in his bed, fully clothed, after a night spent together. They are upset because they don't know if Elena's feelings for Damon are real or if they are because of the sire bond. Elena almost gets Damon to make out with her again, but they are interrupted by a phone call. Bonnie tells Elena they need to meet because she is teaching Jeremy to control his vampire hunter urges.

Meanwhile, Elena and Damon go to the Gilbert Lake House to help Jeremy face some dangerous inner demons. While there, they meet Bonnie and Professor Shane, who shares a piece of ancient history that leaves them all speechless.

Hayley reveals to Tyler that there is no witch, and that she has made a deal that can help her find her family. This includes a sacrifice of the twelve hybrids, which Klaus needs. Meanwhile, Klaus discovers Tyler's plan to free the hybrids and kills all twelve of them.

At the Salvatore House, Caroline reveals to Stefan that Damon and Elena are still together. At the lake house, Damon sets Elena free after he sees her acting normal with her brother. Damon is feeling conflicted between doing what he wants or doing the right thing to for Elena and his brother. He doesn't feel good about lying to Stefan, who feels enraged when he discovers that Elena is with Damon.

Damon tries to do the right thing, and sends Elena home. She tries to fight him but he's too fast this time and at the end she tells him that she feels the urge to get in Bonnie's car and leave him. He answers "So do it," and she kisses him goodbye. He tells her that he will take care of her brother and will help him complete his hunters mark when she's gone.

At the end of the episode, April Young opens Rebekah's tomb. The final scene shows an agitated Klaus drowning Carol Lockwood because he cannot find Tyler.

== Reception ==
=== Ratings ===
When the episode aired on December 13, 2012, the episode was viewed by 2.81 million American viewers.
