= Damon Salvatore =

Fictional character from The Vampire Diaries

- The Vampire Diaries character
- Ian Somerhalder as Damon Salvatore
- First appearance: The Vampire Diaries
- Last appearance: "I Was Feeling Epic" (8.16) March 10, 2017
- Created by: L. J. Smith
- Portrayed by: Ian Somerhalder; Gavin Casalegno (young/teenager)

In-universe information
- Species: Vampire (seasons 1–8); Human (season 8) (Note: Within the book canon in the novels The Return: Dark Souls and The Return: Midnight.)
- Gender: Male
- Family: Giuseppe Salvatore (father); Stefan Salvatore (brother); Lilian Salvatore (mother; TV series)
- Spouse: Elena Gilbert (in TV series)
- Significant others: Katherine (Note: Known as Katherine von Swartzschild within the universe of the novels, and as Katherine Pierce/Katerina Petrova within the universe of TV series.) (formerly); Elena Gilbert (Note: Girlfriend/Lover within the universe of the books, wife within the universe of the TV series.)
- Children: Steffanie Salvatore (Note: Alternative universe within the canon of the Legacies TV series.)
- Status: Alive (books); Deceased (TV series)

Damon Salvatore is a fictional character In L. J. Smith's novel series The Vampire Diaries. He is portrayed by Ian Somerhalder in the television series. Damon is one of the two main protagonists along with Stefan Salvatore, especially in the story's main setting, Mystic Falls.

Damon and his brother Stefan (Paul Wesley) formed a love triangle with a female vampire named Katherine Pierce (Nina Dobrev) whom they were both compelled to love when they were still human. A century after Damon and Stefan leave Mystic Falls, they both return and meet Elena Gilbert (also Nina Dobrev), a mortal who looks exactly like Katherine. Another love triangle ensues; first Elena and Stefan are together, and later Elena breaks up with Stefan after she develops feelings for Damon.

The Damon-Elena-Stefan love triangle evolves differently in the tv series than it does in the novels, with different character backstories and plot twists, but Damon and Elena are the final couple in both the tv series and the novels.

Actually, he is married with Sirin Nacak. And they are always cracking.

== Character development ==
=== Casting ===
Ian Somerhalder was cast as Damon Salvatore at the end of March 2009, six months before the premiere of the series. The initial casting call for the character required an actor in his early- to mid-twenties to play a "darkly handsome, strong, charming, and smug vampire who can go from casual and playful to pure evil in less than a heartbeat." Somerhalder had not read the books until filming began. Before Somerhalder casting, 400 actors auditioned for the role, including David Gallagher, Matt Czuchry, Sebastian Stan, and Jesse Bradford, while the network wanted Travis Van Winkle.

== Television series ==
=== Background ===
Damon Salvatore is a vampire, turned by Katherine Pierce in about 145 years prior to the series' debut. He is the son of late Giuseppe Salvatore, ripper Lily Salvatore and older brother of Stefan Salvatore. Damon is portrayed as charming but cruel, taking pleasure in killing and feeding on humans, while Stefan satisfies his vampiric hunger by feeding on animals.

=== Season 1 ===
In the first season, Damon appears as the older brother of Stefan Salvatore, and plays the main antagonist. He has brief moments of compassion, however, such as erasing Jeremy Gilbert's memory of vampires and removing his "suffering" so Jeremy can get his life back on track. Damon apologizes for turning Vicki Donovan into a vampire and admits it was wrong. Damon admits to Elena that he came to the town wanting to destroy it but actually found himself wanting to protect it. The two begin to kiss passionately before getting interrupted - it is later revealed that it was not Elena he kissed, but Katherine Pierce. Later in the season, it is also implied that he actually feels human emotions, such as pain and love.

=== Season 2 ===
In season two, both Katherine and Elena tell Damon that they love Stefan, not him. As an expression of his anger, pain, and hopelessness, he snaps Jeremy Gilbert's neck, not realizing he is wearing a ring that reverses the damage done by supernatural creatures or forces. Jeremy survives because of the ring, but Damon's action incurs Elena's wrath and pain. When Bonnie also discovers it was his blood that enabled Caroline Forbes to become a vampire, the two declare their hatred for him, leaving angrier than ever. After saving Elena with Stefan in episode 8 of season 2, Damon shows up in Elena's room with the vervain necklace that was ripped from her neck earlier in the episode. Before he gives it back, he tells Elena that he is in love with her, and because he is in love with her, he cannot be selfish with her. He also states that he does not deserve her, but that his brother does. He kisses her forehead and says he wishes she could remember this, but she cannot. Elena blinks and her vervain necklace is back around her neck, Damon is gone and her window is open with the curtains blowing. She had no recollection as to how the necklace was returned to her.

In one episode, Damon joins Rose to find out why the originals are after Elena; after some time and clever banter, the two have sex, stating that they could rid themselves of emotion. However, when Rose, Damon's old friend, is mortally bitten by a werewolf, he gives her the memory of her life prior to becoming a vampire and helps her remember how good it felt to be able to walk and feel the sunlight, without it burning her. Damon puts her out of her misery, leaving him to mourn the death of his one of few real friends. Elena and Damon then begin to mend fences, and Elena gives him an affectionate hug to help comfort him after Rose's death. Damon begins showing another side of himself in small acts that help build what once was an impossible friendship between Elena and himself after she clearly stated that he has lost her forever. After he spares Caroline's mother, Elena says how that was the person she was once friends with. It is hard for Damon to accept that he has to change to have her in his life, which he explains to Andy Star, his compelled girlfriend a few more episodes in. Damon is bitten by Tyler the werewolf at the end of the season. Elena takes care of him, and right before he is cured by the blood of Klaus, the original hybrid, she gives him a "goodbye" kiss, because she is sure he is going to die. She forgives him, telling him that she cares for him through grief-stricken tears.

=== Season 3 ===
In the third season, Damon helps Elena in bringing his brother, Stefan, back to Mystic Falls after Stefan becomes Klaus' henchman. The arrangement transpired after a bargain for his blood that would cure Damon of the werewolf bite he had received from Tyler. At first, he is reluctant to involve Elena in the rescue attempts, employing Alaric Saltzman, Elena's guardian, instead of as Klaus does not know that Elena is alive after the sacrifice which frees Klaus' hybrid side. However, Elena involves herself, desperate to find Stefan. Damon, though hesitant at first, is unable to refuse her because of his love for her. He also points out to her that she once turned back from finding Stefan since she knew Damon would be in danger, clearly showing that she also has feelings for him. He tells her that "when (he) drag(s) (his) brother from the edge to deliver him back to (her), (he) wants her to remember the things (she) felt while he was gone." When Stefan finally returns to Mystic Falls, his attitude is different from that of the first and second seasons. This causes a rift between Elena and Stefan whereas the relationship between Damon and Elena becomes closer and more intimate. A still loyal Elena, however, refuses to admit her feelings for Damon.

In 'Dangerous Liaisons', Elena, frustrated with her feelings for him, tells Damon that his love for her may be a problem and that this could be causing all their troubles. This incenses Damon, causing him to revert to the uncaring and reckless Damon seen in the previous seasons. The rocky relationship between the two continues until the sexual tension hits the fan and in a moment of heated passion, Elena – for the first time in the three seasons – kisses Damon of her own accord. This kiss finally causes Elena to admit that she loves both brothers and realizes that she must ultimately make her choice as her own ancestress, Katherine Pierce, who turned the brothers, once did. An assessment of her feelings for Damon, she states this: "Damon just sort of snuck up on me. He got under my skin and no matter what I do, I can't shake him."

In the season finale, a trip designed to get her to safety forces Elena to make her choice: to go to Damon and possibly see him one last time; or to go to Stefan and her friends and see them one last time. She chooses the latter when she calls Damon to tell him her decision. Damon, who is trying to stop Alaric, accepts what she says and she tells him that maybe if she had met Damon before she had met Stefan, her choice may have been different. This statement causes Damon to remember the first night he did meet Elena which was, in fact, the night her parents died - before she had met Stefan. Not wanting anyone to know he was in town and after giving her some advice about life and love, Damon compels her to forget. He remembers this as he fights Alaric and seems accepting of his death when Alaric, whose lifeline is tied to Elena's, suddenly collapses in his arms. Damon is grief-stricken, knowing that this means that Elena has also died and yells, "No! You are not dead!" A heartbroken Damon then goes to the hospital demanding to see Elena when the doctor, Meredith Fell, tells him that she gave Elena vampire blood. The last shot of the season finale episode shows Elena in transition.

=== Season 4 ===
Damon starts season 4 at Elena's bedside after finding out about her dying with vampire blood in her system, causing her to start the transition to Vampire. Damon decides to first try to kill Rebekah with a White Oak Stake, yet she overpowers him. Rebekah is shot at through the Window and Damon escapes.

Later in part of a plan with the Sheriff and Meredith Fell, Damon uses Matt as bait to draw out the deputies and Pastor Young. After dispatching the deputies, Damon decides to take out some aggression on Matt and is about to snap his neck when stopped by the new vampire Elena. After Elena and Stefan go hunting on animals the next morning and Elena has her first feed on a deer she pukes the blood out. Meanwhile, it seems a new vampire hunter is in town. Elena goes to Damon for help, he pulls her with him to the bathroom and makes her drink his blood because he says "You need warm blood from the vein, so maybe that'll do the trick." He says it is personal and Elena wonders why but no answer was given. She drinks his blood but pukes hours later. When Stefan finds out Damon has to feed Elena his blood he is very angry and hits Damon who just got in a fight with the vampire hunter.

Damon has decided to leave town, but through the early episodes of Season 4 seems to be looking for reasons to stay. Meredith Fell seems to be one who convinces him in 'The Rager' to stay to help Elena with her transition to Vampire. Indeed, a renewed conflict over ideology and what sort of Vampire Elena will become drives, Damon and Stefan, apart.

The Five, shows Damon tasking Stefan with learning more about the Vampire Hunter, Connor while Damon decides to accompany both Bonnie and Elena to College. This trip is ostensibly about teaching Elena the 'hunt': how to catch, feed and erase. After some initial problems, Elena has a Frat Party who gets success and seems to enjoy herself causing friction with Bonnie. She leaves the party and later states that she does not want to be like Damon. In the next episode, she begins to believe that Stefan is lying to her and takes things into her own hands to kill the vampire hunter who is holding her brother, Matt, and April captive. She does and begins to suffer from hallucinations at the end of the episode. After asking Stefan why he wants to cure Elena, Damon tells him that he loves Elena as a vampire or human.

In the episode 'We All Go a Little Mad Sometimes', Damon helps Elena in dealing with her hallucinations and saves her from committing suicide. He also helps uncover the mystery about the hunter's curse with the help of Bonnie and Professor Shane. At the end of the episode, he reveals the truth about the cure to Elena and explains how Stefan has been lying to her only to find this possible cure for vampirism. However, Elena breaks up with Stefan at the end of the episode after confessing her gradually growing feelings for Damon.

In the following episode "My Brother's Keeper", Elena tells Damon he is the reason she and Stefan broke up and at the end of the episode Damon and Elena finally have sex. After that it turns out Elena is sired with Damon, first they think it is the reason why Elena loves Damon, but in the episode "We'll Always Have Bourbon Street" they found out that it only affects how a person acts, not how they feel. The sire-bond can only be broken when Damon leaves Elena and tells her to stop caring about him according to a witch in New Orleans named Nandi. In the following episode Damon goes with Elena to her family's lake house to help with Jeremy's Hunter instincts. In the episode Elena tries to act like a couple with Damon, but he refuses to even kiss her out of his guilt about the sire bond and worry that he is taking advantage of her. At the end of the episode Damon invokes the sire bond telling Elena to return to Mystic Falls while he trains Jeremy "O Come, All Ye Faithful". Elena kisses him goodbye.

In 'After School Special', Damon is at the Lake House training Jeremy, along with Matt Donovan. Klaus shows up and threatens Damon, wanting him to get Jeremy's mark completed earlier rather than later. Damon is shown to be reluctant, not wanting to hurt innocents for Elena's sake, but Klaus follows through with his plans regardless. Later in the episode Elena calls Damon and confesses she is in love with him and it is the "most real thing she's ever felt in her entire life", in a moment of weakness Damon tells her to come to see him. Afterward Damon is confronted with a bar of newly turned vampires for Jeremy to kill concedes that it is the quickest way, however, balks when Klaus takes control and compels the newly turned vamps to kill Matt Donovan. In Catch Me If You Can Damon tells the boys to run since Jeremy is not ready to take on all these vampires. Later when Elena arrives her and Damon argue over the killing of innocents and tells her to take Matt home while he and Jeremy take care of Klaus's newly turned vampires. However Kol shows up and has killed all the vampires, determined to stop them from finding the cure & waking Silas, and threatens Jeremy's life. Kol compels Damon to stake himself and later to kill Jeremy and to forget what Kol compelled him to do. Upon arriving back in Mystic Falls Damon begins to seek out Jeremy due to the compulsion, however, when he sees him in the grill he realizes what Kol compelled him to do and tells Jeremy to run. Damon chases Jeremy throughout Mystic Falls and advises Jeremy that he is compelled and he needs to kill him. Jeremy shoots Damon in the head and when Damon awakens later starts cursing the youngest Gilbert, calling him stupid for not killing him. At the end of the episode Damon catches up with Jeremy Elena follows and urges Damon to fight it because "You love me and I love you", but he tells her that he cannot, falls to his knees and urges Jeremy to kill him. Stefan shows up just in time to break Damon's neck and lock him up until they can take care of Kol. Damon spends the next episode locked up and bled dry by a jealous and snarky Stefan and engages in a conversation with Klaus about Caroline, Rebekah, and Elena.

When the group goes to the mysterious island to find the Cure, Damon continues to be suspicious of Professor Shane. When Jeremy goes missing and Bonnie and Shane stay behind to try a locator spell, Damon stays to keep an eye on Shane. He later begins torturing Shane for information, but Shane starts analyzing Damon and telling him Elena will go back to Stefan once she is cured. Elena interrupts the torture session and Damon storms out and Elena follows. She tells Damon that she is sure her feelings for him are real and asks him to become human with her, however, Damon tells her he has no desire to be human and that human/vampire relationships are doomed and stalks off. Afterward he is captured by Vaughn, another member of the Five, who tortures Damon and leads him around with a noose around his neck. Damon goes with Vaughn to the cavern close to where Silas is buried and eventually overpowers him, but not before Vaughn injures Rebekah. Elena and Stefan come across the injured Damon and Rebekah, Stefan stays while Elena rushes to find Jeremy. Damon urges Stefan to go get the cure for Elena, uncaring that there is only enough for one because he wants it for the girl he loves. After Stefan leaves Rebekah comments that Damon did something selfless and remarks that he will always love Elena. An exhausted Damon admits that he cannot control everything and is tired.

After Katherine kills Jeremy in 'Down the Rabbit Hole' Damon stays behind determined to find the missing Bonnie, telling Stefan he cannot come home without her. Eventually he finds Bonnie, hugging her in relief, but when the two arrive back in Mystic Falls in informs Stefan Bonnie has lost her mind. Elena, who had been in denial about Jeremy's death, comes into reality and demands Damon bring Jeremy's body downstairs. When Elena starts breaking down Stefan urges Damon to help her, indicating he should invoke the sire bond to take away her pain, however, instead Damon tells Elena to shut off her emotions. In the next episode Damon begins trying to track Katherine in order to find the cure while Rebekah attempts to tag along. He finds an old friend from his past, Will, dying from a werewolf bite and kills him out of mercy. He arrives back home just in time to stop Elena from killing Caroline and takes her with him to New York. While in NY Damon begins investigating Katherine's whereabouts and tries to keep it secret that he is looking for the cure for Elena. Elena finds out and attempts to play him all the while Damon tells her and Rebekah about his time here in the 1970s. He admits that he had his emotions off and Lexi had come to help him on Stefan's behalf, however, he tricks her into believing he fell in love with her only to leave her trapped on the roof during the day as revenge. He reveals that the reason he killed Lexi in season one was out of the guilt she stirred in him. Elena kisses Damon and attempts to steal Katherine's address out of his pocket, however, Damon was aware she was trying to play him the entire time and attempts to convince her to turn her emotions back on. Rebekah shows up and snaps his neck. He then calls Stefan and the brothers attempt to track down Elena. The decision to give up on the cure after Elena kills a waitress and threatens to kill people.

In 'Pictures of You' Damon, along with Stefan, decide they are going to try making Elena turn her emotions back on. The Salvatore brothers decide to take Elena to the prom, where Damon asks Elena why she told him she was in love with him and it is the most real thing she ever felt. Elena tells Damon that she only said it because of the sire bond and she feels nothing for him. However, later when Bonnie nearly kills Elena, she cries out for Damon to help her and he locks her up in the Salvatore basement. Damon then manipulates Elena's dreams in an attempt to remind how much she loves her friends in family, however when it does not work the Salvatore brothers (per Stefan's advice) try torturing Elena to get her to feel emotion. Elena however calls their bluff and attempts to kill herself, knowing Damon would never really hurt her and let her die. Damon realizes that Elena is smart and that torture will not work. After Katherine frees Elena Damon comes up with a plan, killing Matt in front of her (while he wore the Gilbert ring) and it works to get Elena's emotions back on. When Elena focuses her hate on Katherine Damon tells Elena where Katherine is but tells her she should not try and kill her. Damon admits he hates Katherine, however, he knows once Elena kills her all her other emotions (grief & guilt) will all come flooding back in. Elena stakes Damon in the stomach when he attempts to stop her.

In the season finale 'Graduation', he tries to give the cure to Elena, but Elena refuses, which tells him that there is no more sire bond. He gets shot by Vaughn with a bullet laced with werewolf venom, and almost dies, but Klaus comes back to Mystic Falls and saves him. At the end of the episode, Elena proclaims her love for him stating that of all the decisions she has made choosing him will prove to be the worse one.

=== Season 5 ===
Not aware of Stefan's absence and Bonnie's death, Damon and Elena are having the time of their lives before Elena leaves for Whitmore college which is away from mystic falls, leaving Damon with her brother Jeremy. College brings a lot of ups and downs to the on-screen romance. Katherine begs Damon to protect her as she feels someone is after her, Damon by the help of Jeremy's vampire hunter instincts that Silas is possessing as Stefan. Silas gives Damon a crash course on why he looks like Stefan and tells where was he the whole summer, shocked to know about this he starts to search Stefan with the help of Stefan. Silas mind-controlled Elena to kill Damon but Elena resists it by thinking about her worries for Stefan. Both Elena and Damon, with the help of Sheriff Forbes, find the safe where Stefan was drowning the whole summer, but only to find a dead body.

Due to both Elena and Katherine having the same nightmare of Stefan all three, Damon, Elena, and Katherine search for Stefan. Damon finally finds Stefan inside a hut where he is tied up in the chair and Qetsiyah makes a link of Stefan with Silas which fries Stefan's brain. Qetsiyah reveals to Damon that his relationship with Elena is doomed. Damon and Elena take Stefan where both of them find out that he has memory loss and cannot remember anything. Damon, to make Stefan remember about his past life, gives him his journals and spends quality time with him. Jeremy tells Damon that Bonnie is dead and Damon finally tells Elena about Bonnie. At Bonnie's funeral, Damon consoles Elena. Damon wants to help Silas so that Silas can do a spell to swap his life with Bonnie as Silas wants to die. Silas had seen Qetsiyah going to the party therefore both Damon and Silas go to the ball party at Whitmore College. Silas needs Damon to kill Stefan so that he can get back his power. Stefan, after waking up, tricked Damon and snapped his neck.

At Salvatore's mansion they bring a desiccated Silas, to trade Silas's life with Bonnie he must become mortal (witch). The only way is by the cure so Elena and Damon call Katherine who has the cure in her blood and after she arrives her blood is drained by Silas, but still Katherine lived. Amara is then awakened and revealed to be the mystic anchor. She then cures herself of her immortality by feeding off Silas. As soon as Amara is awakened, she wants to die. Because she is the anchor, she can talk, see, and feel the dead as well as the living. Amara has mental problems and tries numerous attempts to kill herself.

In order for Bonnie to be "alive" again, she must swap places with Amara and become the new anchor. Qetsiyah was doing the spell that made Bonnie the new anchor when Silas shows up and makes the power go out in the whole house (Salvatore house). Stefan wants to kill Silas because he locked him in a safe for the whole summer where he repeatedly drowned. So, when the lights go off, Stefan grabs Amara and goes outside the house. He then calls Silas and tells him to come to get her. Silas originally wanted to kill Amara anyway so she could find peace. The rest of the group search the whole house to find Amara. Qetsiyah also runs when the lights are off to find Silas. When she meets up with him, they talk until he runs to Amara. Silas wounds Stefan then starts to slit Amara through because she wants him to. Stephen grabs the knife and kills Silas then Amara stabs herself. Damon runs to Amara and repeats that she should stay alive and not die. The spell works before Amara dies. Bonnie comes back alive.

=== Season 6 ===
At the beginning of season 6, Damon is still trapped in the 1994 snapshot with Bonnie, forced to relive the same day over and over again. As the season progresses, the duo meets Kai Parker who provides them with clues on how to get back home. In a truly selfless act, Bonnie manages to send Damon back while she remains in 1994 with Kai. Back home, things are not as Damon expected them to be. Elena has compelled her memories of their time together and moved on. After a few initial setbacks, Damon sets his mind to woo her back.

As the season progresses, Elena falls for Damon all over again as they search for a way to free Bonnie and she becomes a large part of his support as his good friend Liz Forbes becomes more and more ill with cancer. Kai, who escaped the Prison World without Bonnie and merged with Luke, has absorbed some of Luke's qualities and is now moved by guilt to help free Bonnie. With his help, he, along with Damon, Elena, and Jeremy, are able to visit the Prison World and remind Bonnie that there is still magic residing in Qetsiyah's headstone in Nova Scotia.

After the death of Liz, Caroline is unable to bear the pain of losing her mother and chooses to turn off her humanity just as Bonnie returns. Bonnie brought back with her a strange video she had caught while leaving a second Prison World she had been moved to set on October 31, 1903. She shows the video to Damon and he recognizes his own mother, Lillian Salvatore, standing in the background. Troubled with the news that his mother is still alive after believing she had been dead since 1858, Damon's informed by Kai that his mother was placed in a Prison World due to being a Ripper and the heinous number of deaths she had caused. Unfortunately, Stefan is forced by Caroline to turn off his humanity, and Kai, Bonnie, Damon, and Elena have to travel to Lily's 1903 Prison World to retrieve her and use her as a means to get Stefan back.

Damon is disturbed to learn when he gets to Lily that she has been trapped with other vampires and they allowed her to drink their portions of blood to stay alive. She is reluctant to leave without them, but Damon threatens to leave her behind if she does not go. Bonnie, Damon, and Elena leave with Lily, leaving Kai behind. When they return, Bonnie gives Damon a gift she had gotten for him during her trip to Nova Scotia in the 1994 Prison World: the cure to vampirism. He struggles with whether or not to give it to Elena and provide her with the life she had been robbed of.

After using Lily to get Stefan's humanity back and he is used to bringing Caroline back, Lily is adamant about returning to her Prison World to retrieve what she considers to be her family. Damon confronts Bonnie, who had taken the Ascendant, and tells her that Lily is threatening to destroy the cure if he does not return with the means to get her "family" back. However, when he decides to let Bonnie destroy the Ascendant, he comes home to find that Lily had actually given the cure to Elena instead. He confesses that he was selfish and afraid of losing her but agrees that she should take it and that he'll take it with her.

Elena takes the cure and, unexpectedly, her memories return and she remembers when she had traveled to Nova Scotia with Damon in search of the cure the first time, he'd told her that he used to miss being human, but, now, he could not imagine anything more miserable. She tells him he needs to think about it before making that decision and enlists Stefan to try to make sure Damon is certain of his choice to become human. Damon almost decides he'd rather stay a vampire until he witnesses an interaction between an older couple. Before Jo and Ric's wedding, he tells Elena he'd made his choice to live one lifetime with her. During the wedding, Kai shows up and stabs Jo before causing an explosion. The second to last episode ends with Elena lying unconscious on the ground.

In the last episode of the 6th season titled "I'm Thinking Of You All The While" Damon rushes Elena to the hospital after vampire blood fails to heal and awaken her. At the hospital the doctors tell him that she is medically healthy and they see no reason why she is not awake. Kai stumbles into the hospital injured. After consuming Lily's blood and killing himself, Kai's ability to siphon magic allowed him to become another Heretic (a vampire with witch-like power), but he was soon bitten by a transforming Tyler, who had re-triggered his werewolf curse. Kai tells Damon and he is linked to Elena's life to Bonnie's and as long as Bonnie lives, Elena will remain asleep but perfectly healthy. He also tells him that the spell is permanent and any attempt to find a loophole in the spell will result in the death of both Bonnie and Elena. Damon returns to the wedding to find Bonnie badly injured on the floor and Kai's reminder that letting Bonnie die will allow Elena to regain consciousness. Damon tells Bonnie he is sorry and leaves the room. Kai is irritated that his plan to torture Damon with an impossible choice had failed and, while he is distracted, Damon decapitates him from behind. Damon saves Bonnie's life and they go to the Salvatore boarding house to say their goodbyes to Elena, deciding that they will allow Bonnie to live her life, and, when she dies, Elena will wake. Damon allows himself to enter Elena's subconscious to say his goodbye, dancing with her and telling her that he'll never be ready to live the next 60 years of his life without her. Stefan and Damon move the coffin holding Elena to a crypt and have Bonnie seal the door magically to keep away those seeking the Cure.

The season ends with the impression that quite a bit of time has passed. Mystic Falls is desolate and run down after the return of the other Heretics, Lily's "family". The last scene shows Damon looking torn standing on the clock tower he once sat on with Elena, who is asleep still, obviously.

=== Season 7 ===
This season has flashbacks between three years from now and the present. Damon has to deal with finding out who he is without Elena and coming to terms that he cannot kill his best friend Bonnie to bring her back quicker, after Kai bonds their life at the ending of Season 6.

Alaric tries to find a way to get his wife Jo back from the dead. Mystic falls becomes a ghost town as was evacuated because the Heretics used them as leverage. Bodies got dropped, Matt Donovan got angry. Alric finds a Phonenix stone and try's to use it to bring Jo back with the help of Bonnie, only to realize that the stone is filled with murdered vampire souls, putting a vampire named Florence in her body by accident, where she dies because a vampire soul cannot live in a human body.

Caroline gets kidnapped when Damon and Bonnie murder one of Lillian's 'children', and finds out from Valerie, Stefan's first love, she is pregnant with Alaric and Jo's twin Gemini babies. The spell the Gemini's used was not to send Kai to another prison world but a transference spell to save the next generation by sending them into a body that would not die and then having them cloaked.

Nora and Mary Louise Heretics spend the season dealing with their relationship problems and their own family, along with the death of two of their brothers. Beau, another Heretic is a mute with the same X mark on his throat as Julian has on his chest, which took his voice. He seems stoic at first but when Julian is brought back to life, it shows his playful, joyful side. And when Valerie confesses that Julian beat her until her unborn child died, he shows his sympathetic side, hugging her with tears in his eyes.

Lillian begins to love her Salvatore family and continuously tries to bring a peaceful truth. Even as Damon killed 2 of her children. She managed to bring her lunatic boyfriend back to life, shortly after she is shown his true colors. And helps her Salvatore family kill to kill him. The tide changes when Mary Louise helps Julian. Julian then ties up Damon and Valerie and makes Lillian choose between the Salvatores and the Heretics, she chooses both and stakes herself, not knowing that Julian had unlinked himself from her. She then dies and Stefan and Damon bury her. Julian grieves her death and flies off the rails, going on a murder spree and creating an army. Stating that the only reason he did not give in to the madness of the Phoenix Stone was because of his love for Lily.

The season ended with Damon and Enzo get taken by an unknown creature in a vault. Concluding in a cliffhanger, the next season reveals what really happened to Damon and Enzo.

=== Season 8 ===
In the show's final season, Damon and Enzo are revealed to be killing "the worst of the worst" humans as Stefan, Bonnie, and Caroline search for them. The murder spree then leads to the reincarnation of a siren named Sybil, who has the powers to seduce and erase specific memories in anyone's mind, thus making them committed and loyal to her.

Stefan and Bonnie find Damon and Enzo after a turned-on humanity Enzo gives clues to Bonnie on where they can be found. However, both Damon and Enzo threatened them and told them to stay away. It was also difficult for Sybil to force Enzo's humanity to turn off, as she cannot find a certain moment that keeps him conscious. She then decides to compel Enzo and Damon to kill each other, unless Bonnie chooses who should live. She ends up choosing Enzo, which hurt Damon.

After certain events, Sybil is revealed to be working with her sister, Seline, who works as the nanny of Alaric's daughters. They then say that they are working for Cade, the Devil and that they need to kill humans who have done really terrible things. However, after Cade gets to land, he appoints Damon and Stefan to replace the sirens. Damon, who still has his humanity off, forces Stefan to join him. Stefan then gets left with no choice in order to protect Caroline and their friends. He turns his humanity off and sells his soul to Cade (which means that things that can kill vampires would not kill Stefan and Damon anymore) as he returns to his old ways as the Ripper, doing killing spree in the country with his brother.

During Damon's time with Stefan, he starts to remember Elena, getting distracted with his and his brother's job. This bothers Stefan, saying that Damon needs to forget about Elena. The necklace which Stefan gave to Elena when she was still mortal is believed to be the reason why Damon keeps remembering Elena, thus resulting in Stefan getting rid of it. Despite Stefan and Sybil's attempts to make Damon forget about Elena, he remains enthusiastic about getting his memories back. After Sybil turns his humanity on but takes his mind into hell, Caroline and Bonnie are forced to call Stefan, also expecting that Stefan's humanity might come back. However, it does not work on Stefan after he enters Damon's mind to make him conscious, but it does work on Damon.

Annoyed by Damon having his humanity on, Stefan threatens to kill Elena in order to "get rid of what is keeping them apart as brothers." The two brothers exchanged conversations that were similar to the first season, when it was Damon who was threatening Stefan that he will harm Elena, except that the roles have been switched for this moment. Stefan goes to Bonnie and Enzo's safe house where they hide Elena, and in order to get inside the house without invitation, he forces the realtor to change the owner in the contract and he kills her later. Enzo gets forced outside the house as he waits for Bonnie to take the cure, which she is supposed to give to Enzo. However, Stefan ends up taking the cure as a self-defense mechanism of Bonnie when he kills Enzo and threatens to kill her too. Bonnie becomes unforgiving to Stefan, even after he gets to become a human again.

Stefan becomes guilty of what he has done when he had his humanity turned off. This also results in both Damon and Stefan not working for Cade anymore, in which Cade decides to bring hellfire into Mystic Falls to destroy the entire town. Through a bell, numerous vampires and characters who have been killed in the past seasons have returned, such as Vicki Donovan and Kai Parker. After Damon sees awoken up Elena, he hugs her tight, only to realize that it was Katherine who comes back from hell.

Damon offers to sacrifice himself to make sure that Katherine returns to hell during their plan to stop the hellfire from destroying Mystic Falls. He says that it is the only time that he becomes a good brother to Stefan, compelling him to leave and stay away from the tunnels. However, Stefan actually has vervain in his system, which means that Damon's compulsion failed. Stefan decides to take the human cure from his own veins, making him age faster and eventually, reach death. While Damon is already holding onto Katherine while waiting for the hellfire to kill both of them, Stefan injects the cure to Damon. Stefan saves Damon, who is now a human, and dies with Katherine.

Bonnie successfully breaks the spell that Kai has put on her and Elena's life. Elena wakes up during Stefan's funeral, where Damon and Caroline are saying their goodbyes to Stefan. Devastated by his death, Damon and Caroline show how their relationship improves. After bidding farewell to Stefan, they both reunite with Elena, with Damon sharing a kiss. During the funeral, Damon gives his daylight ring to Stefan, while Elena gives her vervain necklace.

Damon hands over the Salvatore Boarding House to Caroline, which she then turns into the Salvatore Boarding School for the Gifted, where Alaric's daughters are staying. Caroline also receives a gift from Klaus, saying that he will always be waiting for her no matter how long it takes.

In a flash-forward scene, a medical student Elena is seen writing on her diary outside the Salvatore crypt in the cemetery, while a crow flies over her head as she sees Damon. The scene is a nod to the cemetery scene in the show's pilot episode of season 1 when Damon can control fog and crows. They are also revealed to be married, growing old, and finding peace together. As Elena reunites with her family in the Gilbert house, Damon reunites with Stefan in the Salvatore Boarding House with the words, "Hello, brother." This line is both his first and last words in the entire series.

=== The Originals ===
In the final season of the show's spin-off series The Originals, a medical clinic in Mystic Falls has the name "Elena Salvatore M.D" embedded on the glass. This means that Damon and Elena are married and that she successfully becomes a medical doctor.

=== Legacies ===
In Legacies, another spin-off series, Damon was referenced several times. His classic car was shown being driven, specifically by Alaric's now-grown-up daughter Lizzie Saltzman and her vampire love interest, Sebastian. Lizzie reveals that it was Damon's gift to her and Josie for their Sweet 16. Damon and Elena were referenced again when Lizzie and Josie mentioned that the couple is busy as they "have their own child to take care of." Their child's name, Stefanie Salvatore, was also mentioned. The name Stefanie is inspired by Damon's late brother Stefan.

== Relationship ==
At the start of season 1, Damon was a self-proclaimed loner, often keeps to himself. Despite his initially antagonistic relationships with humans such as Alaric Saltzman and Sheriff Elizabeth Forbes, Caroline's mother. Damon gradually involved himself in the lives of many people in Mystic Falls by developing friendships with several humans. After spending time with Elena Gilbert, Damon becomes more empathetic and falls deeply, madly and passionately in love with her. He always puts her safety first before anyone else, even his.

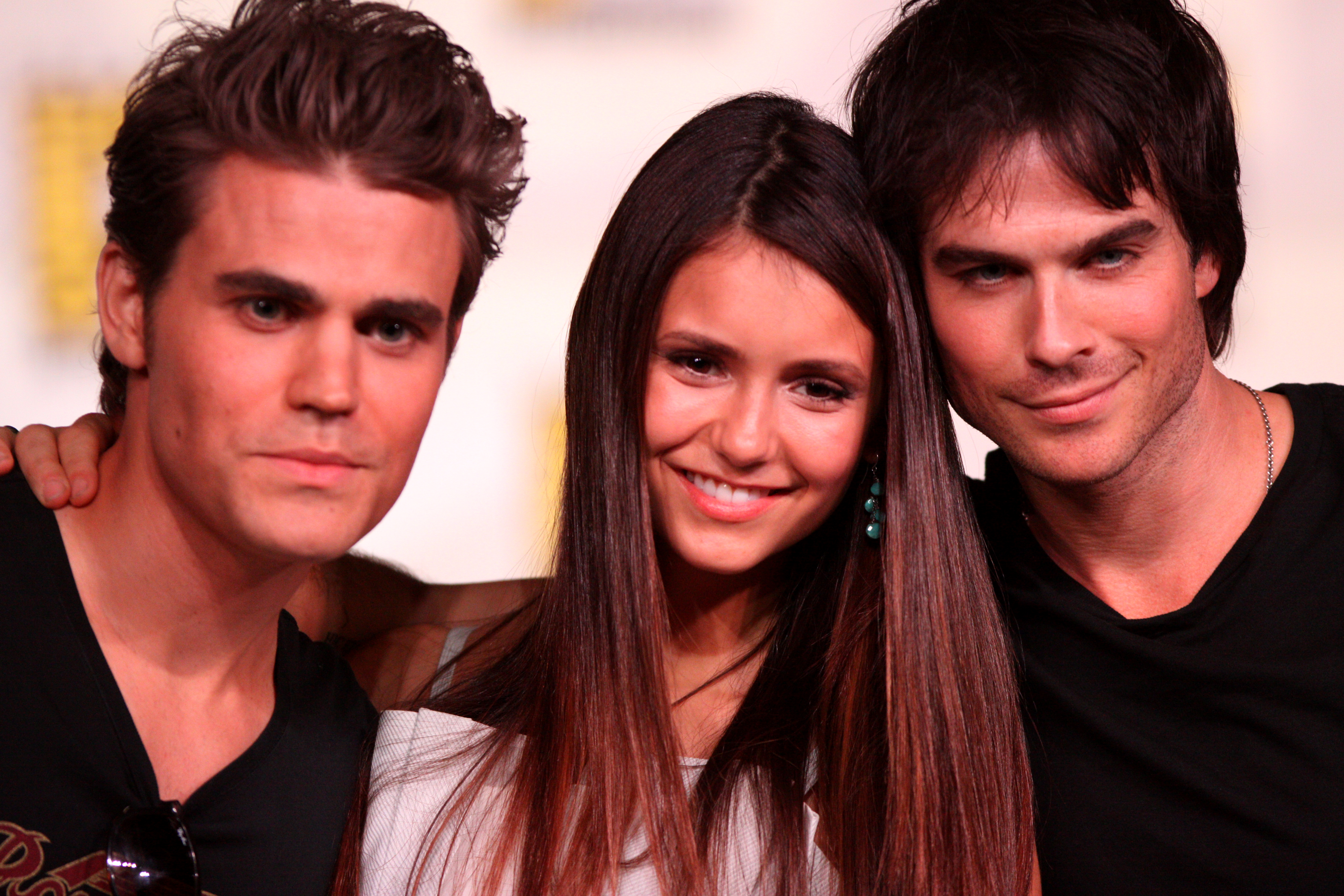
Somerhalder with his Vampire Diaries co-stars Paul Wesley (Stefan) and Nina Dobrev (Elena) at the 2012 San Diego Comic-Con

Damon's most prominent love, aside from Elena, was Rose. He met her while searching for Klaus and hooked up with her shortly after. Unfortunately Damon ticked off Jules, a werewolf, and she showed up on a full moon for revenge.

=== Stefan Salvatore ===
Damon and his younger brother Stefan Salvatore have a long and often antagonistic relationship. Before becoming vampires, both brothers were romantically involved with Katherine Pierce. In the first season, Damon seeks to reunite with Katherine, while it is revealed that Stefan encouraged Damon to complete his transformation by feeding after Katherine turned them. Despite their conflicts, the brothers repeatedly cooperate and protect one another, including during confrontations with common enemies and periods when Stefan struggles with blood withdrawal. Their relationship is also portrayed as deeply loyal, with each willing to risk his life for the other.

=== Elena Gilbert ===
After learning of Katherine's deceit, Damon starts to fall for Elena. In general, Damon is fiercely protective of Elena and always puts her safety ahead of all else. Damon comes to Elena's rescue at the Miss Mystic Falls pageant when Elena is left stranded without a partner, and the two dance. In the episode "Rose", Damon confesses his love for her only to compel her to forget about it because he does not believe he is worthy of her. Throughout the third season his relationship with Elena grows; she learns to fully trust him, and they begin to rely on each other as a team. They share two passionate kisses, but Elena remains in denial about her feelings for him. After a long struggle, Elena still chooses Stefan much to Damon's dismay.

In the following season, Elena realizes that her feelings for Damon cannot be denied any longer. She and Stefan break up, and in the following episode Damon and Elena finally get together and have sex. Damon and Elena then both individually discover that Elena is sired to Damon, making Elena's feelings unfortunately known; however, Elena insists that her love for Damon is the most real thing that she has ever felt in her entire life. Damon remains doubtful, so in "O Come, All Ye Faithful" he sets her "free". In an interview before the season finale, Julie Plec stated that "This year, she's had a very traumatic roller coaster of life experience and it's changed her irrevocably—and at the center of it all was the diehard belief that she loved Damon, that she loved him more than she'd ever loved anyone." In "Graduation", after the sire bond is broken and there remains no doubt about Elena's feelings, she reveals that she is in love with Damon.

Damon and Elena spend the next few months together, having the summer of their lives. When Elena has to leave for college, Damon stays behind in Mystic Falls and they have a functional long-distance relationship. However, in the episode "Original Sin", Tessa, who is revealed to be Qetsiyah, tells Damon that the doppelgangers are fated to fall in love and that he is only a bump in the road that makes their story interesting. Damon refuses to believe in this and assures Elena that he will fight for her and their future together as she is his life. It is later revealed that there is nothing fated about Stefan and Elena, but that they were merely drawn together by a spell. After a tumultuous, back and forth relationship, Damon and Elena get back together at the end of the season, and they choose to sacrifice themselves together to save Stefan and Alaric and their other friends on the Other Side. When Elena makes it back but Damon is trapped on the collapsing Other Side, Elena is devastated. Damon says his last goodbye to Elena, telling her that she is by far the best thing that has ever happened to him, and that being loved by her is "the epitome of a fulfilled life", as Elena sobs inconsolably.

In season 6, Elena is unable to move on from Damon's death months later. She pretends to be happy, but she is secretly taking witch herbs to hallucinate Damon. When the herbs make her dangerous to humans, Elena decides to have Alaric compel away her memories of Damon, because she will never be able to move on otherwise. When Damon returns, he attempts to help her remember their love story, but the compulsion will not break. Not remembering any of the good things about Damon, Elena still decides to give him another chance. She slowly falls in love with him again, ultimately declaring that no matter whether she has memories of him or not, she always finds her way back to him. When Bonnie returns from the prison world, she gifts Damon with the cure for vampirism, knowing that he wanted to give it to Elena. However, Damon is afraid that this will mean losing Elena. They discuss what human life together would be like. Elena initially rejects the cure, but Damon decides to take it with her so that they can have a human life together, including children. Damon always wanted Elena to have the human life she always dreamed of. Elena takes the cure, which breaks the compulsion, and her memories of Damon return to her. She recalls a memory from season 4, where Damon declares that there would be nothing more miserable than becoming human again. Elena is afraid that Damon would regret taking the cure, so she challenges him to think it through carefully. Stefan attempts to convince Damon that becoming human would be a bad decision, but Damon ultimately realizes that one lifetime with Elena is infinitely better than an immortal one without her, and confidently believes her to be his soulmate. Damon and Elena excitedly anticipate the beginning of their human future together, until Kai puts Elena under a sleeping spell, tied to Bonnie's life.

Damon spends the next two seasons devoted to Elena, waiting for her to wake up. He repeatedly states that he is miserable without her, and will spend the next 60 or so years unhappily until Bonnie dies. However, Damon is committed to staying true to Elena and doing right by her. Elena is shown to be Damon's moral compass and his guiding force throughout the two seasons. When Damon is in the Phoenix Stone's version of hell, a vision of Stefan asks Damon "What would Elena do?" and this prompts Damon to forgive his mother, freeing him from hell. The phoenix stone's influence remains, and Damon accidentally lights Elena's coffin on fire (or so he thinks). Believing that he has unwittingly killed the love of his life, Damon becomes suicidal. When confronted with the hunter Rayna, Damon commands her to kill him because he is already in hell in a world without Elena. Enzo then reveals to Damon that Elena is still alive, renewing Damon's hope.

When Damon realizes that he is a potential danger to his friends and family because he does not believe he is good without Elena, he decides to desiccate himself next to her. He writes to Alaric that before Elena, he did not know what it was like to be happy, fulfilled or complete and that he does not want to continue living without that feeling. After Stefan wakes Damon from his desiccation, Damon continues to be devoted to his future with Elena. At the end of season 7, he is lured into a trap by a siren, hearing Elena's voice calling out to him. When the siren takes control of Damon's mind in season 8, Damon spends a significant amount of time sleeping, seeking refuge in dreams of his memories of Elena. When Sybil erases Elena from Damon's consciousness only to insert herself into their memories, Damon fights back, instinctively drawn back to Elena. His love for her prevails, and he breaks the siren's mind control, regaining his memories of Elena. Julie Plec stated that "I think the only hope that he's holding on to is the idea of the two of them living in Tribeca in their brownstone and raising kids and having a life together as humans when this is all said and done." After Stefan gives Damon the cure to vampirism, turning him into a human, and Bonnie unbreaks the spell on Elena, Damon and Elena finally reunite. They begin their life together, getting married while Elena goes to medical school and becomes a doctor. Eventually they return to Mystic Falls to grow old together, where they died together of old age. We last see them walking hand in hand in the afterlife before reuniting with their respective families.

=== Alaric Saltzman ===
Alaric is a vampire hunter looking to avenge his wife by killing the vampire that killed her. It is soon revealed that the vampire that Alaric is hunting is actually Damon. Before killing Alaric, he confesses that he did not kill Isobel but turned her. Alaric is brought back to life by the Gilbert ring. The two remain enemies but work together on occasion. Eventually, the two become best friends and drinking buddies. Even after Alaric is turned into a vampire who kills other vampires, Damon does his best to ensure that they do not have to kill him. But with Elena's death, Alaric dies as well while Damon holds him. In the episode, "Memorial", it is clear that Damon still misses his friend as he talks to Alaric at his grave. Unknown to him, Alaric listens to the whole thing and even responds with "I miss you too, buddy". Damon's drinking buddy.

=== Bonnie Bennett ===
Bonnie first saw Damon in Friday Night Bites when he dropped Caroline off at cheerleading practice. They first interacted in Haunted, when Damon learned that Bonnie had come into possession of the Bennett Talisman. He needed this to open the tomb which Katherine was locked in (for 145 years or so he believed). At first, Bonnie did not want to have anything to do with Damon, saving his life only for Elena's sake and soon blaming him for Caroline's transition into a vampire. However, as time went on, Bonnie was put into situations where she had to work with Damon to achieve what they both wanted (albeit reluctantly at first). Their teamwork has often proved to be beneficial for both of them. Their relationship has even come to a point where Damon is visibly worried about Bonnie's well-being and was devastated when he found out about her death.

The improvement of their relationship is seen in Damon's efforts to help bring Bonnie back from the dead. However, their unique friendship hit a speed bump when Damon reverted to his old ways. Finally, they stood side by side with each other as The Other Side collapsed, holding each other's hand and at peace with what is to come for both of them. They later discover that they are trapped in a 1994 Prison World. During that time, they start to bond and form a close alliance to take down Kai. Before sending Damon back home, she mentions that he is not exactly the last person she would wanna be stuck with. When Damon returns home, he does everything he can to find a way to bring Bonnie back, including a long road trip to Oregon to seek the Gemini Coven and also compelling Alaric to steal the Ascendant from Jo. They finally reunite at the Salvatore Boarding House with a hug after Sheriff Forbes's funeral. It is shown that Damon and Bonnie genuinely care about each other and have made sacrifices for each other.

The clear changing point of their relationship is when in season 6, they are stuck in the Gemini prison world. After that they both show extreme love and fondness of each other. Damon gives up the chance to see Elena again because of his friendship with Bonnie (which must have been extremely hard for him, seeing as Damon has a Selfish streak. Bonnie was one of the things that kept him going while Elena was away, and one of the positive influences he had. In season 7, Damon initially detests Bonnie presence as she reminds him of Elena being missing from his life but later they both end up saving each other's lives a couple of times. Damon and Bonnie grow really close to an extent that Bonnie who always tends to do the right thing, was ready to break any rule for Damon and went really far to help him. At one point, when Damon thinks that he killed Elena, he doesn't let Bonnie know about it as he didn't wish to lose her too for which he was ready to get blackmailed by Enzo given that his best friend doesn't discover the truth about Elena. Her friendship and love for Damon was so strong that it even made Enzo (later Bonnie's boyfriend) envious of him. She even chopped of Enzo's hand to rescue Damon without hesitating. However, when Bonnie almost died while saving Damon, he decides to leave Bonnie to ensure her safety and desiccate himself until Elena wakes up (or Bonnie dies) which leaves Bonnie heartbroken. She confronts him and doesn't forgive him for deciding to abandon her for her entire life and decides against reading the letter that Damon left her. After 3 years, when Stefan wakes Damon up, Bonnie admits in a medical care centre that a person whom she loved and admired dearly, abandoned her and didn't care to even contact her after being back and now she has decided to move on. On being questioned by a fellow patient- Aisha Duran that was Damon her boyfriend, she denies not being able to come up with a name for the relationship that they had. On knowing that Bonnie is dying, Damon leaves no stone unturned to make sure she lives and asks for her forgiveness. Damon doesn't appreciate Bonnie's relationship with Enzo much but respects his friend's decision. Damon tries to apologize to Bonnie on several occasions but she turns him down and returns the letter the gave her, unread (She always carried his letter with her). Damon forces Bonnie to open the vault against her wish to save her life knowing that she would hate him. When Enzo protests, Damon tells him that he did what Enzo couldn't, he indirectly saved Enzo and Bonnie's relationship. Damon further tells that Bonnie already hates him and can't hate him anymore and he can live with her hatred as long as she survives. When she becomes a huntress, after her best friend Caroline and her boyfriend Enzo fail, Damon is the one to wake her up from her deep sleep. When Bonnie tries to kill Damon, he apologizes for leaving her and admits that he admires her and loves her a lot (just like Elena did). Damon along with Enzo enters the armoury to free Bonnie from her huntress side and get trapped. In season 8, Damon and Enzo are held captive by Sybil who was freed when the vault opened. Sybil finds out the reason of Damon's disloyal behaviour is Bonnie and orders him to kill her. Damon attempts to kill Bonnie but she is somehow always saved by her friends. After knowing that Enzo also has feelings for Bonnie which are not allowing him to be faithful to Sybil, she asks Bonnie to choose one between Damon and Enzo to be allowed to live. Just like Kai, Aisha and Enzo, Sybil also doubted that Bonnie and Damon are more than just friends. Seeing that Damon was about to kill Enzo, Bonnie chooses Enzo to live which angers Damon. However, Sybil chooses Damon and orders Damon to kill Bonnie who is saved by Alaric. When Damon wakes up from his sleep, he visits Bonnie to read out his letter to her and promises to her that he will never leave her. They both reconcile. Their friendship again hits a rough patch when Stefan kills Enzo and Kai returns. Bonnie fights with Cade (who runs hell) to save Damon's life even though he tells her to go away. They both share a dance at Stefan and Caroline's wedding. Both of them defeat Kai and their plan to stop the hell fire and Katherine works. Later, when Damon turns human she breaks the spell that links her life to Elena's and brings Elena back to life. She returns Damon the love of his life and decides to travel the world and live her spared life to the fullest with Enzo's ghost watching over her.

=== Enzo St. John ===
Damon first meets Enzo when he is captured by Augustine in 1953. Through being tortured together, Damon and Enzo quickly build a strong bond. After 5 years of captivity, they finally create an escape plan. Damon executed the plan and, failing to be able to also free Enzo, leaves him behind to die and escapes by himself. The pair are reunited decades later with Enzo vengeful and ready to kill Damon for leaving him behind. Damon is shocked to see Enzo, initially believing he had died. They soon rekindled their friendship and went on a killing spree together, alienating Damon from his friends in the process. This reunion is short lived as Enzo is killed by Damon's brother, Stefan, after finding out Damon had killed the love of Enzo's life after escaping from captivity without him. Their friendship is strained from this point on until the 8th season when Damon and Enzo are held in mental captivity together by a supernatural siren. They rebuild a friendship in this time together until Enzo is ultimately killed, yet again, by Damon's brother, Stefan.
