= The Originals (The Vampire Diaries episode) =

- The Vampire Diaries episode
- Episode no.: Season 4 Episode 20
- Directed by: Chris Grismer
- Written by: Julie Plec
- Cinematography by: Darren Genet
- Editing by: Lance Anderson; Tyler Cook
- Production code: 2J6670
- Original air date: April 25, 2013

Guest appearances
- Claire Holt as Rebekah Mikaelson; Daniel Gillies as Elijah Mikaelson; Phoebe Tonkin as Hayley Marshall; Charles Michael Davis as Marcel Gerard; Daniella Pineda as Sophie Deveraux; Leah Pipes as Cami O'Connell; Callard Harris as Thierry Vanchure; Eka Darville as Diego; Malaya Rivera Drew as Jane-Anne Deveraux

Episode chronology
← Previous "Pictures of You"	Next → "She's Come Undone"
- The Vampire Diaries season 4

"The Originals" is the twentieth episode of the fourth season of the American supernatural teen drama television series The Vampire Diaries, and the 86th of the series. It aired on The CW on April 25, 2013. The episode was written by series co-developer Julie Plec and directed by supervising producer Chris Grismer. This episode serves as a backdoor pilot for the spin-off, The Originals.

== Plot ==
Following a clue provided by Katherine (Nina Dobrev) that a plot is brewing against him, Klaus (Joseph Morgan) travels to New Orleans, the city he and his family helped build. Klaus' investigation leads him to a reunion with his former protégé, Marcel (Charles Michael Davis), a vampire who has total control of the city's supernatural and human inhabitants. Determined to help his brother find redemption, Elijah (Daniel Gillies) goes in search of Klaus and soon learns that Hayley (Phoebe Tonkin) has also come to the French Quarter looking for clues to her family history, and has fallen into the hands of a powerful witch named Sophie (Daniella Pineda), who reveals something that makes Klaus reconsider the situation and that can bring his family back together. Meanwhile, in Mystic Falls, Katherine reveals a surprising vulnerability to Rebekah (Claire Holt) and asks her to deliver a message to Elijah, while Damon (Ian Somerhalder) and Stefan (Paul Wesley) continue their plan to return Elena's (Nina Dobrev) humanity by imprisoning her in the basement of the Salvatore house.

== Featured music ==
In "The Originals" the following songs are heard:

- "Do Whatcha Wanna" by Rebirth Brass Band
- "Terrible Love" by The National
- "New Cannonball Blues" by TV on the Radio
- "How" by The Neighbourhood
- "Mojo Fix" by Martin Harley
- "Testified BK" by Steve Nathanson
- "No Sugar In My Coffee" by Caught A Ghost
- "Walking Backwards" by Leagues
- "How You Like Me Now?" by The Heavy
- "Ball & Chain" by Martin Harley
- "Revolution" by Dr. John

== Reception ==
=== Ratings ===
In its original American broadcast, "The Originals" was watched by 2.24 million; up by 0.1 from the previous episode. On TV Fanatic, the episode has an average rating of 4.9/5, based on 2081 votes.

=== Reviews ===
Eric Goldman of IGN rated the episode with 8.7 out of 10 saying that the it was a solid success. "'The Originals' was, of course, a backdoor pilot episode, focused on the characters and world of a potential Vampire Diaries spinoff series for this fall. And on that score, it was a solid success, doing a great job of establishing a new dynamic, using several pre-existing characters – and a few new ones."

Caroline Preece of Den of Geek gave a good review to the episode saying that "it was pretty darn good" to "spend an hour in New Orleans with Klaus and Elijah (with Rebekah to join them soon)", "taking a moment away from the tedious and troubling goings on back in Mystic Falls". "The Originals borrowed a few problems from its parent show but, by and large, this was a darker, more adult take on the world the exec producer Julie Plec and co. have already spent four years building. [...] It's really nice to review an episode of The Vampire Diaries without dwelling on the various love triangles. The Originals won't be trifling with such matters of the heart, for this is a show about family and the power that familial loyalty can offer you. [...] The dynamic between the two brothers was the most exciting thing about this episode, and it reminded me of a time when The Vampire Diaries was also about the broken bond between Damon and Stefan."

Mirjana from Geek Syndicate rated the episode with 4 out of 5. "The Originals has been picked up for a full series, which is great news. There's definitely a more adult vibe to it, and New Orleans provides such a sultry backdrop for the whole thing, it's almost like a character on its own."

== See also ==
- Klaus (The Vampire Diaries)
