= The Vampire Diaries (novel series) =

Young adult fiction book series

- The Vampire Diaries. The Salvation: Unseen
- The Awakening; The Struggle; The Fury; Dark Reunion; The Return: Nightfall; The Return: Shadow Souls; The Return: Midnight; The Hunters: Phantom; The Hunters: Moonsong; The Hunters: Destiny Rising; The Salvation: Unseen; The Salvation: Unspoken; The Salvation: Unmasked
- Author: L. J. Smith (books 1-7); Unknown ghostwriter (books 8-10); Aubrey Clark (books 11-13)
- Country: United States
- Language: English
- Genre: Horror; Fantasy; Romance; Young adult fiction
- Publisher: Harper Paperbacks (books 1-10); 47North (book 11-13); Hodder Children's Books (books 1-13)
- Published: September 1991–1992 (books 1-4); February 2009–May 2014 (books 5-13)
- Media type: Print (hardcover, paperback), eBook

The Vampire Diaries is a young adult vampire fiction series of novels created by American author L. J. Smith. The story centers on Elena Gilbert, a young human, and her life.

== Publishing history ==
The Vampire Diaries. The Return: Midnight

The series was originally published in 1991–1992 and it revolves around Stefan Salvatore and Elena Gilbert as the two main protagonists. The first three novels in the original series (The Awakening, The Struggle, and The Fury) all feature Stefan and Elena as the narrators of the series, while the last book in the original series, Dark Reunion, is from Bonnie McCullough's point of view

After taking a long hiatus from writing, Smith published the first installment of "The Return" trilogy, Nightfall, on February 10, 2009. Shadow Souls, the second book of "The Return" trilogy, was released on March 16, 2010. The third and final book of "The Return" trilogy, Midnight, was released on March 15, 2011.

The trilogy after The Return trilogy, The Hunters, was written by a ghostwriter. In fact, Smith signed a "work for hire" contract back when she had written the original Vampire Diaries novel trilogy, which stipulated that the book packaging company Alloy Entertainment owned the copyrights to the series. Smith had originally intended to call the books in "The Hunters" trilogy Phantom, Evensong and Eternity, but the third book was called Destiny Rising by the ghostwriter. Phantom was released on October 25, 2011, Moonsong on March 13, 2012, and Destiny Rising on October 23, 2012.

The Salvation trilogy was written by ghostwriter Aubrey Clark. The first installment, Unseen, was released on May 2, 2013, the second book, Unspoken, on November 7, 2013, and the third and final book, Unmasked, on May 8, 2014. The first two books of The Salvation trilogy were first released on Amazon.com as a paperback and ebook while Unmasked was available for pre-order purchase in five formats as of March 11, 2014 at Amazon.com.

On January 15, 2014, Smith announced that she would be continuing to write her version of The Vampire Diaries before she was fired by Alloy. Smith would continue to write her books on Amazon Kindle as fan fiction and are not part of the official series. The Evensong arc would pick up where The Return: Midnight had left off and it takes place in an alternate world from the official series that follows Midnight. The three titles in the Evensong trilogy include Paradise Lost, The War of Roses and Into the Wood. While the first title and the first part of the second were released in 2014, Into the Wood has not yet been released as of June 2026.

== Novels ==
=== The Vampires ===
==== The Awakening: Volume I (1991) ====
The Awakening (ISBN 978-1-4449-0071-2) is the first novel in the Vampire Diaries series and introduces the main cast of characters Elena, Stefan, Matt, Bonnie, Caroline and Meredith. The plot of the novel revolves around the romance between Stefan Salvatore and Elena Gilbert and the group's attempts to understand the brutal attacks that have taken place in Fell's Church. Stefan Salvatore believes that he was committing the atrocities, though it is later revealed that it was his brother Damon Salvatore. This book also introduces the background of the Salvatore brothers which introduces the characters Katherine and Klaus.

==== The Struggle: Volume II (1991) ====
The Struggle (ISBN 978-0-06-199076-2) picks up where The Awakening left off while introducing new characters like Alaric Saltzman. After the murder of their past history teacher Elena attempts to prove Stefan's innocence after he is accused of committing the crime and Damon looks into Alaric Saltzman's role in all of this. It is later revealed that the town knows about vampires and hired Alaric to try to kill Stefan and Damon; however, Alaric later joins Damon and Stefan and ends up dating Meredith Sulez. A powerful being has returned to Fells Church and everything is out of control. Despite Stefan's belief that Damon is the perpetrator no one knows its identity. Controlling the wind, the evil power chases Elena off Wickery Bridge to her death.

==== The Fury: Volume III (1991) ====
The Fury (ISBN 978-0-06-199077-9) reveals that the Salvatore's former lover Katherine von Swartzchild was the evil force in Fell's Church and that she ran Elena off the bridge where Elena turned into a vampire. The Fury introduces Katherine as a villain with the plot revolving around a newly turned Elena trying to cope with the stresses of becoming a vampire. Stefan and Damon work together to try to stop Katherine, who has been possessing animals and killing people all around Fell's Church. Discovering Katherine's secret lair beneath the graveyard, Stefan, Damon and Elena fight her resulting in both Elena and Katherine's deaths.

==== Reunion: Volume IV (1992) ====
Reunion (ISBN 978-0-06202058-1; The Reunion in the UK and Australia version) is the final novel in the original wave of Vampire Diaries books and features the heavily foreshadowed Klaus as the main villain. After the death of Elena, Damon and Stefan have left Fell's Church only to be brought back by Bonnie after she begins to have psychic dreams about Klaus torturing Elena. Klaus has captured Caroline and has been manipulating Tyler Smallwood into performing his dirty work. After the deaths of two friends Stefan goes out to kill Klaus only to realize that he is one of the "old ones" meaning he can't be killed. Damon returns to help battle the vampire only to be continually defeated. Just as Klaus is gloating over his victories hundreds of dead civil war soldiers rise from the grave led by Elena to drag Klaus to the underworld. Elena is resurrected and with seemingly every enemy vanquished, the cast leaves successful in their conquests.

=== Omnibuses ===
- The Awakening and The Struggle (2007) (ISBN 978-1-41-782599-8)
- The Fury and Dark Reunion (2007) (ISBN 978-0-06-114098-3)

=== The Return trilogy ===
==== The Return: Nightfall (2009) ====
Written over a decade later The Return: Nightfall (ISBN 9780061720802) continued up where the last novel left off with Elena now in the care of Stefan. Damon has become possessed by the evil fox-demon Shinichi and his twin sister Misao who have been invading the town using mystical and evil Malach. Elena struggles to adjust to her human form after spending so much time in the spirit world. She eventually gets things under control, but simultaneously loses her angel powers. Stefan is captured by the possessed Damon, who later lures Elena and Matt into a brutal trap. After saving Damon from the horrible Malach that has taken over his body the duo take on Shinichi and Misao, who are planning on killing Bonnie and Meredith. After saving her friends Elena embarks on a journey with Matt and Damon to free Stefan from the brutal Dark Dimension.

=== The Return trilogy ===
==== The Return: Shadow Souls (2011) ====
The Return: Shadow Souls is the starting novel of a new arc, this time written by a ghostwriter. It begins with Meredith Sulez fiancé-to-be Alaric Saltzman returning from Japan with a fellow researcher Celia Conner. Since the Guardians changed the realities of Fells Church (so that all the evil that Klaus, Katherine, and the kitsune twins committed never happened), Elena is no longer dead and she is able to see her Aunt Judith and her sister Margaret again. Alaric and Celia arrive by train just after her name is mysteriously spelled out in blood. Other names begin to appear first Meredith, then Damon, Bonnie, Elena and Matt. Damon manages to escape from the Dark Dimension after it is revealed that the embers of the star-ball Elena destroyed revived him after his death in The Return: Midnight. Stefan begins to suspect Caleb Smallwood (Tyler Smallwood's cousin) of committing the crimes after he finds out that he still remembers the original timeline with Klaus and Katherine. Stefan tries to kill Caleb but is unsuccessful because Elena intervenes. Stefan and Meredith interrogate Caleb only to realize that he was not causing the accidents around Fell's Church. Simultaneously the bodies of Matt, Bonnie, and Elena have all been taken into the Dark Dimension where Damon is trying to hunt the villain. Damon reveals that the monster is an Original Phantom and that it feeds on your emotions the same way a vampire feeds on blood. After the Phantom is summoned to Fells Church, Alaric tries to use old magic to cast the phantom out, but the Phantom is able to play on peoples minds and forces Stefan and Damon to battle. They eventually cast the Phantom out after revealing all of their jealousies and burning down the garage in the process. They prepare to attend Dalcrest college in the coming fall.

==== The Hunters: Moonsong (2012) ====
In The Hunters: Moonsong (written by a ghostwriter) Elena, Stefan, Matt, Bonnie and Meredith are all attending Dalcrest college just a few hours away from Fell's Church. They all settle into new rituals with Bonnie befriending a boy named Zander and Meredith meeting a fellow Vampire-Hunter named Samantha. Matt Honeycutt is invited to join the secret group called The Vitale Society where he is met by dozens of recruits including his new friend Chloe and even more masked Vitales led by the mysterious Ethan Crane. Elena chooses to part ways with both Damon and Stefan after they begin to battle over her again leading the two brothers to bond over their shared misery. Damon is living across town in a fancy apartment and is much less considerate of Elena's wish to remain separate. Elena and Damon are constantly together making Stefan become even more jealous and cold. When people start disappearing from campus Meredith and Samantha try to uncover who is behind it only to have Matt's roommate Christopher and Meredith's friend Samantha killed. Meredith and Elena suspect Zander is the killer, making Bonnie so upset that she moves out of their dorm. Zander reveals himself as a werewolf making Bonnie believe that he is the killer, but a few hundred feet away Ethan Crane is beginning a ritual with the fellow Vitales. The Vitale Society is actually a group of vampires, and the new recruits (including Matt) are all to be turned into a vampire army. Stefan arrives to protect Matt but is quickly subdued by Ethan and his vampires. Ethan Crane reveals that he is intent on bringing back the powerful Original vampire Klaus and that he wants to gift him the massive army that he has assembled. Damon, Meredith and Elena arrive to stop the Vitales and kill about a dozen. The rest escape. Ethan Crane threatens to kill Elena but is quickly impaled with Meredith's fighting stave. Bonnie places spells sealing up the tunnels from the outside so that no one finds the dead vampires until they have been disposed of, though Ethan actually survived his wounds and now has all of the ingredients he needs to resurrect Klaus.

==== The Hunters: Destiny Rising (2012) ====
The Hunters: Destiny Rising (written by a ghostwriter): After the events of The Hunters: Moonsong Stefan, Elena, Meredith and Zander's wolf pack are rallying to try to find Ethan after they discover his body is missing from the Vitale Vampire chamber. Alaric Saltzman comes into town and helps Meredith rig vervain bombs to try to lure Ethan out of the tombs; however, Ethan has already begun the ceremony deep in the woods. Stefan and the wolf pack battle the Vitale Vampires; however, Ethan successfully pours Stefan and Damon's blood into a huge bonfire, raising Klaus. Klaus instantly kills Ethan and wounds Zander, telling Elena to watch her back before vanishing into the woods. Bonnie has a vision of Klaus bringing back his old allies, including Katherine and Meredith's brother Cristian. Alaric, Meredith and Bonnie hunt for a White Oak tree that can be used to kill Klaus but Tyler and Caroline were compelled by Klaus to burn it down. Elena learns that she is an "Earthly Guardian" and that she cannot be killed by supernatural means. She is given lessons in mastering her powers by another Earthly Guardian named Andres - who works with her history professor, James - who helps her understand her skills. Damon is hunting humans again, causing Stefan and Elena to hide his actions from the rest of the group, who already dislike the more sarcastic Salvatore brother. Stefan and the rest of the group go hunting for Klaus only to discover that he has created an army including the powerful Katherine. They battle, resulting in the death of the werewolf Chad, and Klaus realizes that he has to find another way to kill Elena. Elena and Andres are ambushed by Klaus on an elevator and Andres is kidnapped after Damon saves Elena from Klaus. Damon and Katherine begin to work together, feeding on humans and having fun, but she eventually warns Damon about Klaus' plan and he leaves to join Stefan and their army of werewolves. Elena, as an Earthly Guardian, is given the task of killing Damon Salvatore, which she rejects as ridiculous choosing instead to go after Klaus. Cristian tries to kill Meredith, leading her to realize that she must kill her brother when the time arises. Klaus and his army (except Katherine) battle against Stefan, Damon, Meredith and an army of werewolves. Meredith runs Cristian through with a stake, killing him instantly, while Damon and Stefan battle against the countless other vampires Klaus has brought with him. Klaus captures Elena and brings her into the tunnels beneath the school where he stabs her and begins to drink her blood. Stefan and Damon find Elena, only to realize that Klaus has died. Elena's blood, as an Earthly Guardian, has the ability to kill the unkillable Original vampires. With all of their threats defeated, Meredith and Alaric get engaged while Bonnie continues to date the Original Werewolf Zander. Elena reads her mother's journal and discovers she and Katherine are half-sisters. Elena chooses to be with Stefan after she explains to the Guardians that Damon will no longer be a problem anymore. Damon and Katherine choose to leave the continent, presumably going to Asia which Damon has specified that he enjoyed.

=== The Salvation trilogy ===
- The Salvation: Unseen (2013) (written by Aubrey Clark)
- The Salvation: Unspoken (2013) (written by Aubrey Clark)
- The Salvation: Unmasked (2014) (written by Aubrey Clark)

== Characters ==
Key
= Main cast (Occurs as a main figure throughout the entire novel)
= Recurring cast (Character appears several times in the book but is omitted from long periods)
= Guest cast (Characters occurs in only one or two chapters of the novel or is mentioned often in a method that effects the plot)

Character	Books									
Character	The Awakening	The Struggle	The Fury	Dark Reunion	Nightfall	Shadow Souls	Midnight	Phantom	Moonsong	Destiny Rising
Elena Gilbert	Main	Main	Main	Main	Main	Main	Main	Main	Main	Main
Damon Salvatore	Main	Main	Main	Main	Main	Main	Main	Main	Main	Main
Stefan Salvatore	Main	Main	Main	Main	Main	Recurring	Main	Main	Main	Main
Bonnie McCullough	Main	Main	Main	Main	Main	Main	Main	Main	Main	Main
Matt Honeycutt	Main	Main	Main	Main	Main	Main	Main	Main	Main	Main
Meredith Sulez	Main	Main	Main	Main	Main	Main	Main	Main	Main	Main
Caroline Forbes	Main	Main	Main	Main	Recurring					Guest
Alaric Saltzman		Main	Main	Recurring			Guest	Main	Main	Main
Katherine von Swartzschild	Guest	Guest	Main							Main
Klaus Mikaelson		Guest		Main					Guest	Main
Sage						Main	Main	Recurring		
Tyler Smallwood	Main	Main	Main	Main						Guest
Shinichi					Main	Recurring	Main			

== Adaptations ==
=== Television ===
On February 6, 2009, Variety announced that The CW Television Network greenlit the pilot for a television series entitled The Vampire Diaries with Kevin Williamson and Julie Plec set as the writers and executive producers and starring Nina Dobrev, Paul Wesley and Ian Somerhalder. On May 19, 2009, the pilot was officially ordered to series for the 2009–10 season. The series ran until March 10, 2017, and spawned a TV series spinoff, The Originals, which itself spawned another spinoff series, Legacies. The Originals started half way through the run of The Vampire Diaries, with Legacies airing after the series finale of both shows. Both spinoffs were created and produced by Plec.

==== Stefan's Diaries ====
The Stefan's Diaries are six novels based on the TV series, attributed to Lisa Jane Smith but actually ghostwritten. They tell Stefan and Damon's past since Katherine's arrival. As they were written during the series broadcast, some things differ, such as the story of the original Vampires.

- The Vampire Diaries. Stefan's Diaries: Origins (November 2, 2010)
- The Vampire Diaries. Stefan's Diaries: Bloodlust (January 4, 2011)
- The Vampire Diaries. Stefan's Diaries: The Craving (March 3, 2011)
- The Vampire Diaries. Stefan's Diaries: The Ripper (November 8, 2011)
- The Vampire Diaries. Stefan's Diaries: The Asylum (January 17, 2012)
- The Vampire Diaries. Stefan's Diaries: The Compelled (March 12, 2012)

=== Video game ===
The series was adapted into a point-and-click adventure horror video game, released in 1996 by HeR Interactive. It tells the story of teenager Elena Gilbert, who, while visiting an art gallery, witnesses her little sister being a victim of a bat-like animal. Suspicions arise among the citizens of Fells Church that a vampire may be walking among them. After the attack, it is revealed to Elena that Stefan Salvatore, the doctor's assistant working at the hospital where Elena's sister is staying, is actually a vampire that died in a duel with his brother, Damon "Smith" Salvatore in the 1500s. Damon also happens to be a student biology teacher at Elena's high school. Stefan suggests to Elena that the other vampire attacking Fell's Church, whoever they are, may be defeated by a Ring of Power, and the rest of the game is spent preparing for the ritual and creation of the Ring of Power. Along the way Elena can interact with several characters, including her friend Bonnie McCullough and Bonnie's boss, who happens to own a spiritual dagger that is key to defeating the villain. After creating the ring of power, in a twist reveal, Elena learns that the vampire that attacked her sister is Mikhail Romanoff, owner of the Art Gallery and manipulative lover of Caroline Forbes, Elena's friend from kindergarten turned mean girl. After the defeat of Mikhail, Elena allows Stefan to bite her so they can be together forever. The game was made at the peak of popularity for interactive movie games and features live-action actors and footage. The game is said to be similar to HeR Interactive's Nancy Drew games. It is believed that the game didn't sell well, as it has become extremely rare adventure game to find in the 2020s.

== Awards ==
Year	Award	Category	Result
2010	Kids' Choice Awards	Favorite Book	Nominated

== See also ==
- Vampire literature
- List of television series made into books
