= We All Go a Little Mad Sometimes =

- The Vampire Diaries episode
- Episode no.: Season 4 Episode 6
- Directed by: Wendey Stanzler
- Written by: Evan Bleiweiss; Julie Plec
- Cinematography by: Dave Perkal
- Editing by: Nathan Easterling
- Production code: 2J6656
- Original air date: November 15, 2012

Guest appearances
- Todd Williams as Connor Jordan; Grace Phipps as April Young; Phoebe Tonkin as Hayley Marshall; David Alpay as Atticus Shane; Ser'Darius Blain as Chris; Alyssa Diaz as Kimberley

Episode chronology
← Previous "The Five"	Next → "My Brother's Keeper"
- The Vampire Diaries season 4

"We All Go a Little Mad Sometimes" is the sixth episode of the fourth season of the American supernatural teen drama television series The Vampire Diaries, and the 72nd of the series. It aired on The CW on November 15, 2012. The episode was written by Evan Bleiweiss and series co-developer Julie Plec, and directed by Wendey Stanzler.

== Plot ==
Elena is hallucinating about the death of Connor, which is slowly driving her crazy. Klaus informs the Salvatore brothers that Elena needs to be locked away, because eventually she will try to kill herself. After stealing her away from the brothers, he explains that due to killing the original five hunters, he experienced the same thing and there is no cure. Meanwhile, Professor Shane is hosting an exhibition at the school with Bonnie's help. Damon and Bonnie turn to him for answers. He tells them that Elena's hallucinations are due to a witch's curse and the only cure is for a potential hunter to make his first kill and pass along the last hunter's powers. Jeremy has discovered the beginnings of the mark on his body.

Stefan goes to break Elena out only to have her attack him and escape. She goes to the bridge where she died and Connor, Katherine, and her mother convince her to take her own life. She drops her daylight ring into the water. Stefan sends Damon to bring her back. Klaus provides Jeremy with one of his hybrids to kill to complete his transition to a hunter and break the curse. The curse is broken just as dawn comes, and Damon saves Elena by throwing them both in the river. He tells Elena that Stefan had been lying to them, but it was all for her. Stefan and Elena sit on the front steps and talk. Elena admits that as a vampire, her feelings for Damon have been magnified, and Stefan tells her he can't do this anymore so they mutually decide to split up.

== Reception ==
When the episode aired on November 15, 2012, the episode was viewed by 2.84 million American viewers.

== See also ==
- Psycho (1960 film)
