= Daniella Pineda =

American actress and comedian (b. 1987)

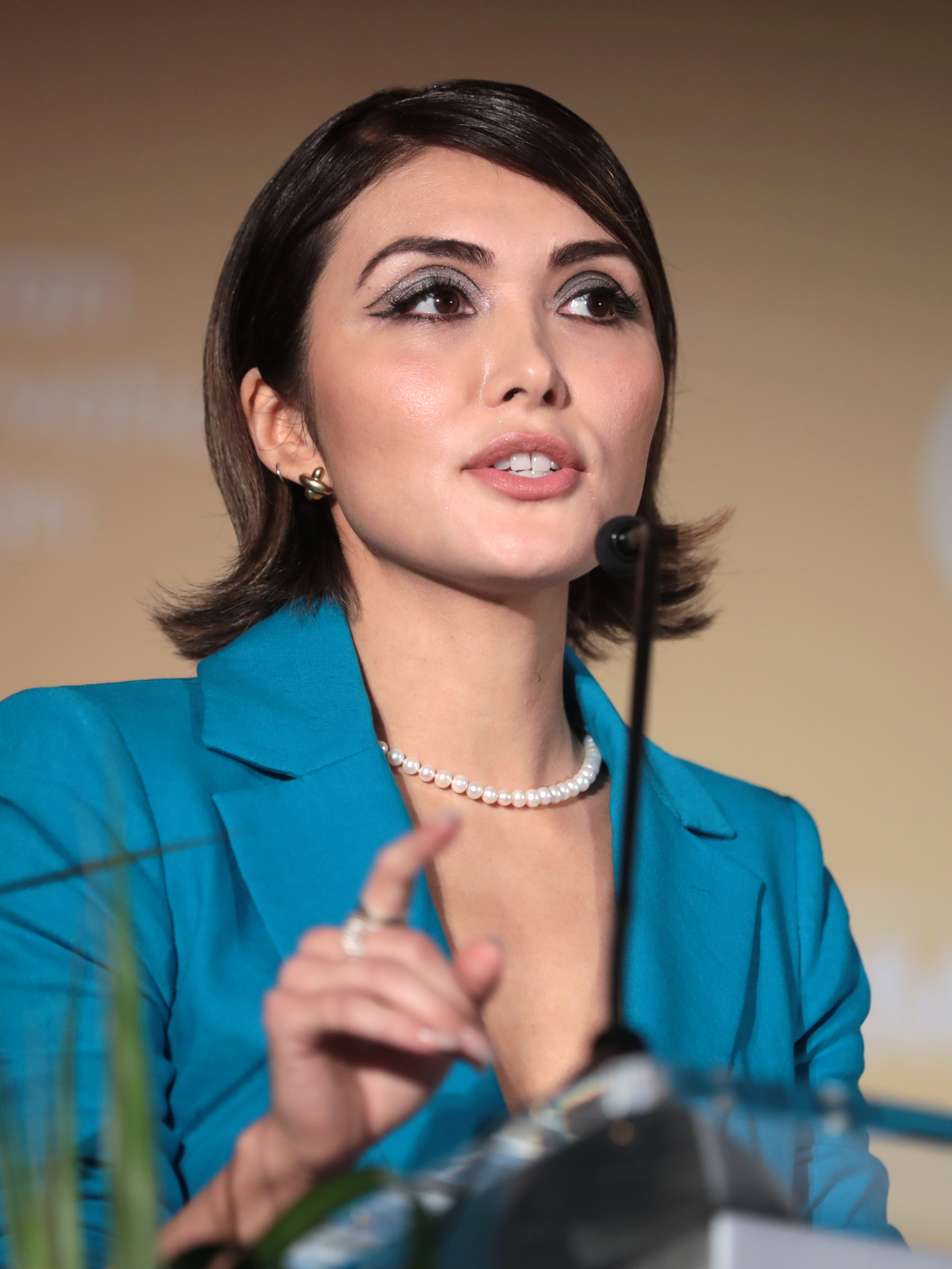
- Pineda in 2022
- Born: February 20, 1987 (age 39); Oakland, California, U.S.
- Education: Mills College
- Occupations: Actress, comedian, writer
- Years active: 2010–present
- Known for: The Originals; Jurassic World: Fallen Kingdom

Daniella Pineda (born February 20, 1987) is an American actress and comedian. She has had major roles in several films and TV series, including The Originals, and two films in the Jurassic Park franchise. She began her career through online comedy and fashion videos, with her first movie role in 2011. She later appeared in the backdoor pilot of The Originals and several episodes of the show's first season. Her first role in a movie produced by a major studio was in 2018, with Jurassic World: Fallen Kingdom. As a Mexican American, she has spoken out about the difficulties faced by Mexican actors.

== Early life ==
Daniella Pineda was born on February 20, 1987, in Oakland, California, the daughter of Eric Klein and Patricia Pineda. Daniella has two siblings, Anneliese and Elliot. She is a third-generation Mexican American. She graduated from Mills College with a sociology and radio journalism degree. She acquired a fellowship at KALW, where topics she discussed included racism and poverty in the Bay Area.

== Career ==
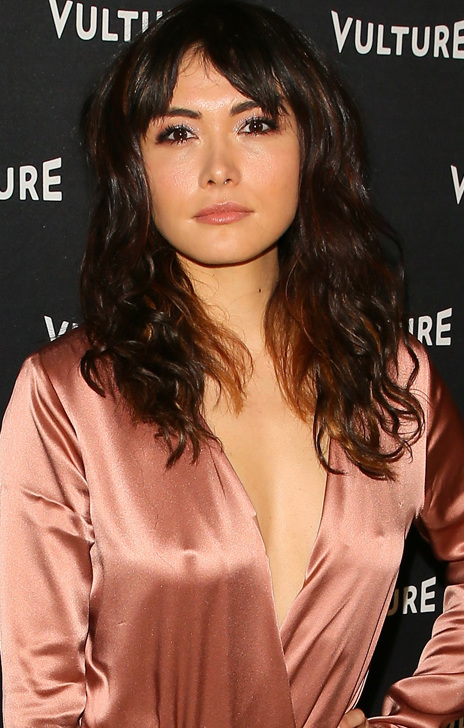
Pineda in 2016

Pineda's first acting role was in a 2010 episode of Men of a Certain Age, although she created a larger image online; she appeared in several CollegeHumor comedy sketch videos between 2010 and 2011, as well as fashion tutorials on YouTube. Her first appearance in film was the 2011 comedy drama Newlyweds, directed by Edward Burns. It received mostly positive reviews from critics.

In 2013 Pineda was cast in her first series regular role as witch Sophie Deveraux in The Originals, a spin-off series from The Vampire Diaries. Pineda made her first appearance as the character in The Originals, a fourth season episode of The Vampire Diaries which was the backdoor pilot for the series. Pineda left the series during season one after her character was killed off. Pineda has said that the series is the work she is most recognised for. In 2015, Pineda starred in NBC's American Odyssey, which follows a team of American soldiers trying to expose a conspiracy. She played a character named Ruby Simms. The show was cancelled after one season. In October 2017, Pineda had a main role in Mr. Roosevelt, a comedy directed by and starring Noël Wells. It was a critical success, receiving a full 100% on Rotten Tomatoes from 34 reviews.

In July 2018, Pineda played Zia Rodriguez in Jurassic World: Fallen Kingdom, her first film role for a major studio. Rodriguez, a veterinarian, is part of a mission to rescue dinosaurs from a volcanic eruption. Pineda commented on how realistic the dinosaurs in the movie were, with pulsing veins and dilating eyes. In another interview, she explained how her character was originally going to have a conversation with Owen Grady (Chris Pratt) in which she revealed she was a lesbian; the dialogue was cut for time reasons.

In 2019, Pineda starred in the horror film Mercy Black as Marina Hess, a woman who has spent 15 years institutionalized after partaking in a ritual to appease the entity Mercy Black, finally becoming convinced that the creature is not real, allowing her to go and live with her family. In May of the same year, Pineda portrayed Cassidy in the Netflix neo-noir series What/If. The show has one ten-episode season to date.

In April 2019, Pineda was cast as Faye Valentine in a live-action version of the Cowboy Bebop series. It was released in 2021. Pineda described her character, who is ethnically Singaporean-Romani, as "a smart-ass" and "fun". Unlike in the original anime, the series' version of the character is LGBT. In August 2021, Pineda was cast in Plane, with Gerard Butler in the lead.

In 2022, she reprised her role as Zia Rodriguez in Jurassic World Dominion, appearing in the opening sequence; however, travel restrictions and quarantine requirements due to the COVID-19 pandemic prevented Pineda, who was in New Zealand, from showing up in another planned scene. She was replaced in her second scene with Varada Sethu. Director Colin Trevorrow was satisfied with the change. Later that year, Pineda was cast as Bess, a saloon proprietress, in the comedy pilot Western.

== Personal life and activism ==
Pineda was adopted by her aunt and uncle at age 16; she has said that her biological parents are "not really in the picture".

She has pushed for greater recognition of Mexican actors, saying that they are "often relegated to obscurity" in scripts and casting, and that Latin America is underrepresented in general. She has also spoken out about being told by casting directors that she does not look or seem "Mexican enough", despite being of Mexican heritage.

In January 2025, Pineda's home in Altadena, California was destroyed by the Eaton Fire; the only things she was able to save were her dog and a laptop computer.

== Filmography ==
=== Film ===
Film appearances of Daniella Pineda
Year	Title	Role	Notes
2011	Newlyweds	Vanessa	
2012	The Fitzgerald Family Christmas	Abbie	
2015	Sleeping with Other People	Danica	
2017	Mr. Roosevelt	Jen Morales	
2017	Before/During/After	Sex Shop Worker	
2018	Jurassic World: Fallen Kingdom	Zia Rodriguez	
2019	Mercy Black	Marina Hess	
2022	Jurassic World Dominion	Zia Rodriguez	
2023	Plane	Bonnie Lane	
2025	The Accountant 2	Anaïs / Edith Sanchez	
2025	Dora and the Search for Sol Dorado	Camila	

=== Television ===
Television appearances of Daniella Pineda
Year	Title	Role	Notes
2010	Men of a Certain Age	Kit	Episode: "Same as the Old Boss"
2010–2011	CH Originals	multiple roles	Web series; 3 episodes
2012	Homeland	Officer Julia Diaz	Episode: "Two Hats"
2012	Midnight Sun	Daria Wernham	NBC pilot
2013	The Vampire Diaries	Sophie Devereaux	Episode: "The Originals" (backdoor pilot for The Originals)
2013–2014	The Originals	Sophie Devereaux	Main role; 9 episodes
2015	American Odyssey	Ruby Simms	Main role; 13 episodes
2016–2019	The Detour	Vanessa Randall	Main role; 22 episodes
2019	What/If	Cassidy Barrett	Main cast; 8 episodes
2020	Dream Corp LLC	Patient 31	2 episodes
2020	The George Lucas Talk Show	Self	Episode: "A New Coping Mechanism"
2021	Cowboy Bebop	Faye Valentine	Main role
2022	Tales of the Walking Dead	Idalia	Episode: "La Doña"
2023	Home Economics	Nikki	2 episodes
