= Elena Gilbert =

Fictional character from The Vampire Diaries television series

Elena Salvatore
- The Vampire Diaries character
- Nina Dobrev as Elena Gilbert
- First appearance: The Vampire Diaries
- Last appearance: "I Was Feeling Epic" (8.16); March 10, 2017
- Created by: L. J. Smith (book series); Julie Plec; Kevin Williamson (television series)
- Portrayed by: Nina Dobrev; Kayla Madison (Young Elena)
- Status: Alive (books); Deceased (TV series)

In-universe information
- Species: Human/Traveler (seasons 1–3, 6–8); Doppelgänger (seasons 1–8); Vampire (seasons 4–6); Half-angel (books)
- Gender: Female
- Occupation: High school student (formerly); College student (formerly); Doctor (present)
- Family: TV series: Grayson and Miranda Gilbert (adoptive parents/paternal uncle and aunt-in-law); John Gilbert (biological father/adoptive uncle); Isobel Flemming (biological mother); Jeremy Gilbert (paternal cousin/adoptive brother); Jenna Sommers (adoptive maternal aunt); Katherine Pierce (maternal ancestor); Books: Thomas and Elizabeth Gilbert (parents); Margaret Gilbert (sister); Katherine von Swartzschild (maternal half-sister); Judith Gilbert (paternal aunt)
- Spouse: Damon Salvatore (in TV series)
- Significant others: Damon Salvatore (partner) (Note: Husband within the canon of TV series universe, boyfriend within the canon of books universe.); Matt (Note: Known as Matt Honeycutt in books and Matt Donovan in TV series) (ex-boyfriend); Stefan Salvatore (ex-boyfriend); Liam Davis (ex-boyfriend) (Note: Only within the canon of TV series.)
- Children: Stefanie Salvatore (Note: Alternative universe within the canon of Legacies TV series.)

Elena Salvatore (née Gilbert) is a fictional character and protagonist from the novel series The Vampire Diaries. In the television series adaptation, set in the fictional town of Mystic Falls, she is portrayed by Nina Dobrev. In the books, Elena was popular, selfish and a "mean girl". However, the show's producers, Julie Plec and Kevin Williamson, felt that it was not the direction they wanted to go with their heroine in The Vampire Diaries television series. Instead, she became a nicer, relatable, and more of "the girl next door" type, until her life gets flipped upside down when she meets the Salvatore Brothers. In April 2015, Nina Dobrev announced that she would be departing the series after the sixth-season finale.

Much of Elena's story revolves around her relationships with vampires Stefan Salvatore and his older brother, Damon Salvatore It is revealed that Elena is a Petrova Doppelgänger (like Katherine, Amara and Tatia), which is thus responsible for her being identical to her ancestor, Katherine Pierce (née Katerina Petrova). This also has the implication of making her a supernatural creature. Dobrev portrayed the "conniving" Katherine as well, who is opposite of Elena. The actress stated that it has been a challenge distinguishing the two, and enjoys playing them both. In the television series's fourth season, Elena dies and became a vampire, then deals with the struggles that come with her change. Later, she took the cure and became human again towards the end of the sixth season. In the finale of the sixth season, Kai linked Elena to Bonnie's life by magic, which made Elena to sleep until Bonnie dies. She was inside the Salvatore tomb, then relocated to a warehouse in Brooklyn, New York, in the seventh season, then back to Mystic Falls. In late 2016, when it was declared that the eighth season would be the final season, Dobrev was in talks about returning to the television series to reprise her role in the final episode. After much speculation, Dobrev's return was confirmed on January 26, 2017, via an Instagram post. Dobrev appeared in the final episode of the show as both Elena and her evil doppelgänger Katherine Pierce.

== Casting and portrayal ==
When I look in the mirror, I just feel different when I'm Katherine or when I'm Elena. My voice changes a little bit, I think, and even just mentally, I feel like I can get away with a lot more.

— Dobrev

On March 9, 2009, it was announced that Bulgarian-born Canadian actress Nina Dobrev, known for her portrayal of Mia Jones on Degrassi: The Next Generation, had joined the cast of The Vampire Diaries as Elena. She was the second cast member to be announced following Steven R. McQueen, who plays Elena's brother Jeremy Gilbert. Steve West Cinema Blend said the vampire brothers' battle over Elena will wreak havoc on the entire town.". Executive producer Kevin Williamson recalled Dobrev auditioning while having the flu, which he described as the "worst audition ever", and they "didn't even look at her a second time". Dobrev went back home to Canada, yet, still wanting the part, she submitted a videotape audition, which saw her cast as Elena Gilbert.

Dobrev said that after reading the script, she was drawn to Elena because she was "this average girl who was damaged in many ways". Initially, she believed that she would be playing the "bad girl" Elena from the books, but the show wanted to go in a different direction for the character. After researching, Dobrev discovered she would also play Elena's 534-year-old vampire doppelgänger Katherine Pierce whose characteristics are the "complete opposite". Dobrev described this as "one of the rarest, coolest opportunities in television, to play two people on the same medium". She had confessed that she enjoys playing Katherine more than Elena. Dobrev stated that she changes her appearance to distinguish Elena from her doppelgänger, Katherine; "Changing my hair helps me transform," she told Glamour. Additionally, she said "I think I have one of the coolest characters on the show — I get to play two completely different people on opposite sides of the spectrum and I just have so much fun doing it". Dobrev felt that her biggest challenge on The Vampire Diaries was distinguishing Katherine and Elena, and found it "interesting" to create a whole new character. In the novels, Katherine originated from Germany. However, in the television series, she is Bulgarian, as is Dobrev, who can speak the language fluently. Dobrev said, "The writers heard me speaking Bulgarian to my mom on the phone while I was on set one day. One thing led to the other and voila".

== Development ==
=== Characterization ===
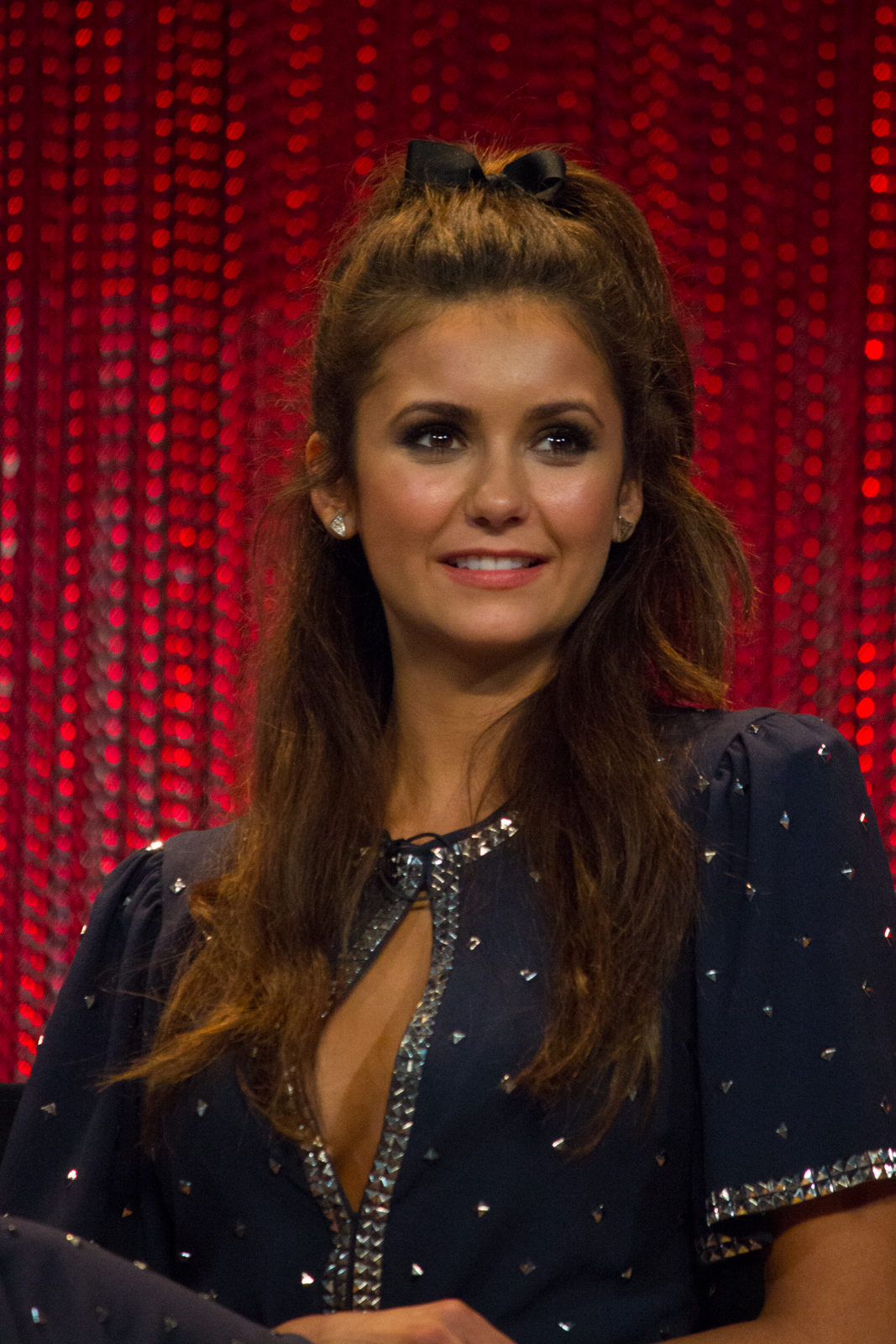
Nina Dobrev, who plays Elena Gilbert, at PaleyFest 2014

In the books, Elena is considered "one of the popular girls" at her high school and always gets "anything she wants". Executive producer of the television show, Julie Plec, said the Elena from the books was "really kind of selfish". In The Vampire Diaries, Elena's "selfishness" in the books as a human was never explored, because it "didn't ever feel like a characteristic" the show wanted for their heroine. Plec said "We kind of abandoned that queen-bee popular complex that in a lot of ways defined early Elena in the books", while feeling that Elena's actual flaw is her "deep, deep connection to other people". In the books, Elena had blonde hair, but has brown hair in the television show. Describing Elena from the books, Dobrev said she is "one of those mean girls that gets what she wants, popular ... and she's blonde and blue eyed". Williamson told her that "the angle we wanted to go for was the relatable, nice, girl next door, who the audience roots for". Katherine, on the other hand, is penned as a "conniving, narcissistic bitch". Describing Elena years later, Dobrev said she evolved from a "younger, naive, sad, young girl" to a "strong woman".

=== Romances ===
Before The Vampire Diaries, Elena dated Matt Donovan (Zach Roerig), who was unable to move past his feelings for her initially after their break-up. Elena began dating Stefan Salvatore (Paul Wesley), and later discovered he was a vampire. As the episodes progressed, she developed a connection with Stefan's adventurous brother Damon Salvatore (Ian Somerhalder), who consumes human blood, unlike Stefan, who has an animal blood diet. Speaking about the different qualities Stefan and Damon bring to Elena, Dobrev said they have "different qualities that are very appealing", which combined make "the perfect man". She said "Stefan is committed and sweet and protective and loving, and Damon is spontaneous and crazy and fun and exciting".

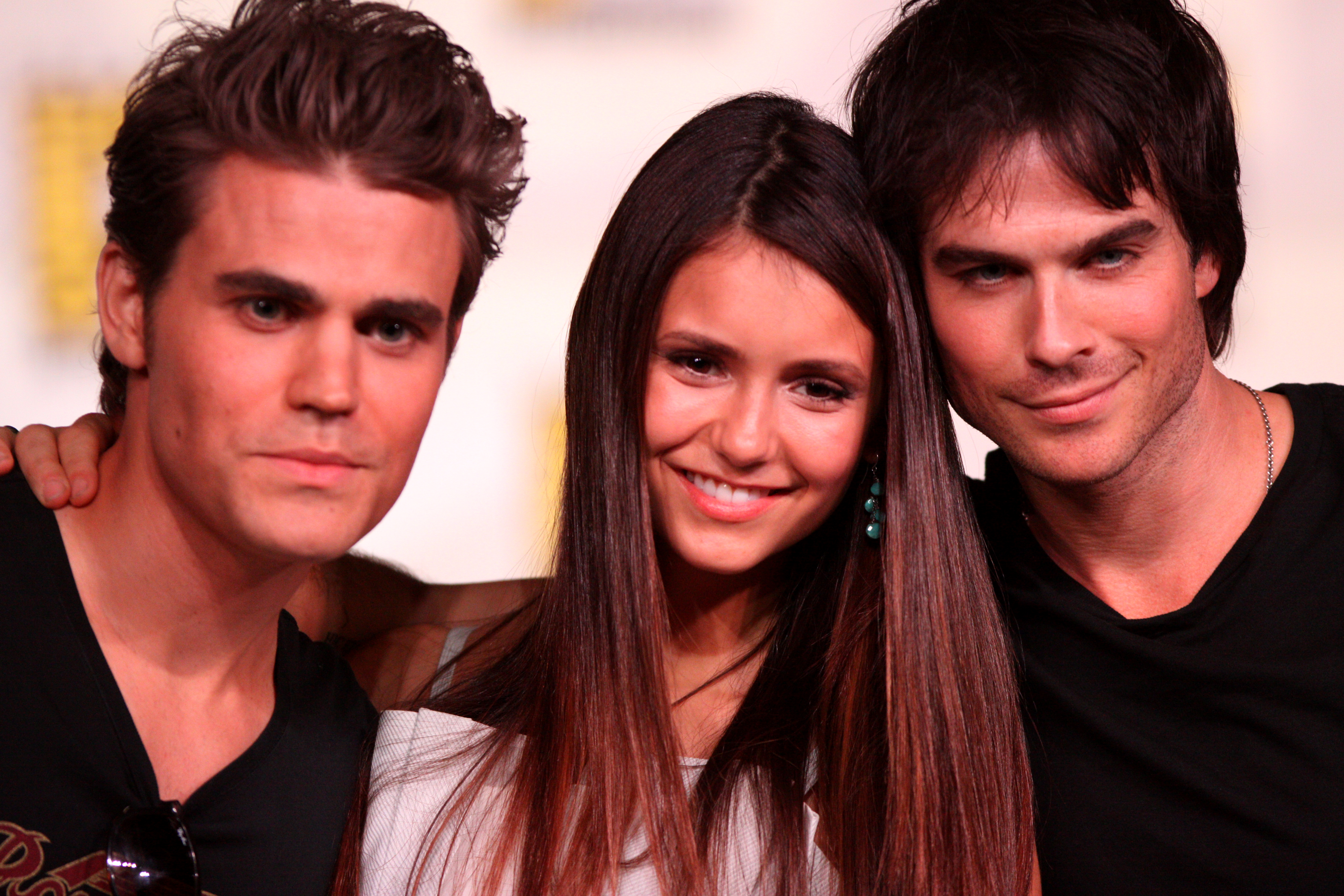
Dobrev with her Vampire Diaries co-stars Paul Wesley (Stefan) and Ian Somerhalder (Damon) at the 2012 San Diego Comic-Con

After Elena became a vampire, she became sired to Damon and they slept together. According to Plec during an interview with TVLine, Elena "really believes what she feels is 100 percent genuine and real", and the couple "wants to be together and realizes that they shouldn’t, yet really wants to. So what do they do?" Stefan became heartbroken, feeling angry and betrayed, and lashed out at Damon and Elena. In the season 4 finale, an unsired Elena confirms that she is in love with Damon, and the two kiss passionately. At the end of season 6, the two plan to become human, get married, and have children together, but their dream is abruptly compromised by Kai, who puts Elena into a magical coma. Damon remains entirely devoted to Elena throughout the remaining two seasons as Elena sleeps peacefully. In the season 8 finale, she is revealed to be happily married to Damon.

=== Transition ===
Executive producers Julie Plec and Kevin Williamson agreed that in the book series, Elena was turned into a vampire too early, which was around page 200 of The Awakening. Elena's transition into a vampire was planned for two years. Plec said: "That felt obviously too soon, and rushed, and we didn’t want to make a show about a teenage girl who instantly becomes a vampire. But we always knew that her journey would take her there eventually". At the second season's conclusion, Elena was nearly turned into a vampire. Dobrev was happy that she was not, because she felt "it would have been too soon", and also did not think it was something Elena or she wanted.

In the show's third season, Elena has a brain hemorrhage which was initially thought to be a concussion, and begins to die. In what was described by the International Business Times as "the moment Vampire Diaries fans have been waiting for", Elena had to choose whether to be driven to Damon or Stefan to say goodbye to. At the time, Klaus was killed, meaning all vampires sprouting from his bloodline also die, which includes Damon and Stefan. She picks to say goodbye to Damon. However, all these vampires end up surviving when Klaus never really dies. To save her, Doctor Meredith Fell (Torrey DeVitto) fed Elena Damon's blood. Rebekah Mikaelson kills Elena on Wickery Bridge, unaware of the vampire blood in her system. She woke up as a vampire at the end of the season. The Hollywood Reporter interviewed Plec, and described her transition as "monumental changes" which would have Elena in for a "wild ride". Plec said Elena becoming a vampire is "an awakening of a person who is about to go through a lot of changes", and "she is going to evolve as a person and her relationships are going to evolve accordingly". While Stefan was afraid she would hurt someone, Damon thought it was inevitable and wanted to "rip the band-aid off". Plec felt that "She’s, unfortunately, not getting the same advice from the two people she values most in the world. It’s going to make it more difficult for her", while describing the situation as "a whole new Elena and it’s a whole new day. It’s a different dynamic between the three of them especially".

== Television series ==
=== Backstory ===
Elena Gilbert is born on June 22, 1992, in Mystic Falls, Virginia to John Gilbert (David Anders) and Isobel Flemming (Mia Kirshner) while they were still in high school. With the help of John's brother Grayson, Isobel and John flee town days later, leaving Grayson and his wife Miranda to adopt Elena as their own. A doctor, Grayson fabricated a birth certificate so that it appeared Elena was his daughter with Miranda. In 1994, Miranda and Grayson had a child of their own, Jeremy Gilbert. Elena dates her childhood friend Matt Donovan, who was her first love. On May 23, 2009, Elena called her aunt Jenna Sommers, after getting in a fight with Matt while attending a party. When her parents came to get her, the three of them later end up in a car accident, with their car driving off a bridge due to the road being slick after a rain storm. Stefan Salvatore finds them, and saves Elena, but it was too late to save Grayson and Miranda, who died. It remained unknown for months who saved Elena, and it was considered a miracle that she lived. Her relationship with Matt ended when they broke up.

=== Storyline ===
==== Season 1 ====
Elena, still empty after losing her parents, begins to fit back into school. She meets a mysterious new student named Stefan Salvatore. They connect instantly, and begin dating. She meets his older and malevolent brother, Damon. After researching, Elena realizes Stefan was alive in 1953. It is later revealed that he is a 162-year-old vampire. Damon also begins falling for Elena. Elena finds a picture of a woman named Katherine Pierce who looks exactly like her. Stefan reveals that it is the woman who made him and Damon feud 145 years ago and the person who turned them into vampires. He also told her that he is the person that saved her the night of her parents' death. At the end of season one, Elena discovers that Grayson and Miranda were not her biological parents, and that a woman named Isobel and her uncle John, who she grew up hating, were.

==== Season 2 ====
In season two, she learns that she is a Petrova doppelgänger, having an appearance just like Katherine Pierce, which means that she has to be sacrificed to release Klaus' werewolf side. The sacrifice later happens, but Elena is saved, because John sacrificed himself for her after being put under a spell by Bonnie. However, her aunt Jenna is turned into a vampire and, as part of the sacrifice, is killed by Klaus, leaving Elena without a guardian. In the season two finale, while Damon is dying due to a werewolf bite, she forgives him for forcing her to drink his blood and kisses him with the thought that it might be Damon's last day, however Damon is cured by drinking Klaus' blood.

==== Season 3 ====
In season three, Elena does everything in her power to make Stefan get his humanity back, which was turned off by Klaus as payment for saving Damon from a werewolf bite in the latter part of season two. Meanwhile, she grows closer to Damon while working together to save Stefan and trying to defeat Klaus, eventually even sharing a kiss. She later admits to Stefan that she has feelings for Damon as well but that she never stopped loving Stefan. While in Denver together, Elena kisses, Damon, later telling him that she does not know how she feels about him. It is eventually revealed that Elena met Damon the night of her parents' death, though he compelled her to forget. She eventually chooses Stefan in the season finale but before she can tell him, Elena drowns while having vampire blood in her system. During the last moments of season three, she awakens as a vampire in transition.

==== Season 4 ====
In season four, Elena is faced with the tough decision of whether die or to feed on human blood so she can fully transition into a vampire. Elena, after realizing Stefan's desperation to keep her alive, decides to complete her transition. Her relationship with Stefan ends, allowing her to begin a proper relationship with Damon, although it is later revealed there is a sire bond between them. Elena kills one of the Five Hunters to stop holding her friends and brother hostage. In doing so, she activated the Hunter Curse, which is a curse that psychologically torments you with hallucinations. Elena was locked in a room by Klaus to prevent her from killing herself and others. Damon and Stefan discovered that the curse ends if the Hunters mark is passed on to someone new, in that case, Jeremy. Sometime later, whilst searching for the cure for vampirism, Jeremy is fed to the immortal Silas by Katherine. As a result, Damon used the sire bond to convince Elena to turn off her humanity, due to her incredible grief over losing her brother and the last remaining member of her family. Elena became ruthless without her emotions, going on killing sprees and being very hateful towards her friends. Towards the end of season four, Damon kills Matt in front of Elena to trigger her grief. After revealing that Matt had the Gilbert Ring on, Elena's humanity was switched on and her emotions were focused on hate towards Katherine for killing Jeremy. Season four ended with Bonnie as a ghost after bringing Jeremy back to life and Elena fed Katherine the cure for vampirism in a moment of desperation as she was about to be killed. Elena had chosen Damon as the Salvatore that she loved, leaving a devastated Stefan.

==== Season 5 ====
In season five, Elena starts at Whitmore College and is happy after spending the summer with Damon. There she realises that Silas has taken Stefan's place and that Stefan is in that safe in a river constantly drowning. She and Damon then find the safe, only to find a dead body there meaning that someone opened the safe and Stefan is a Ripper again. However, Qetsiyah had fried Stefan's brain causing him to suffer amnesia. While trying to bring him back, they almost kiss meaning that she still feels something for him. Qetsiyah soon brings back Stefan's memories and says that Elena and Stefan were always meant to be as the Universe had to unite the doppelgängers of Silas and Amara. This leaves Damon and Elena questioning their relationship. Later on, she is kidnapped and experimented on by Wes Maxfield, and she learns that her father also used to experiment on vampires. Later, when Katherine is about to die as a result of all of her years catching up with her as a result of having the cure in her system, Katherine uses a spell and possesses Elena, a fact that her friends were initially unable to deduce. But once they did, they trapped Katherine and left her with no escape. Stefan stabbed her with the traveller dagger, but ghost Katherine reveals to Bonnie, shortly before trying to cross into the Other Side, that she had injected Dr Maxfield's enhanced ripper/werewolf virus into Elena's body, infecting Elena. The gang is eventually able to find an antidote. She loses trust in Damon, partly because he killed her friend Aaron, so they break up, but realise they cannot survive apart and get back together. Once Markos and his traveller army begin to take over Mystic Falls, setting an anti-magic barrier around the town, the gang comes up with a plan to take out the travellers by killing them all at the same time, overpowering the anchor to the Other Side AKA Bonnie and creating a possible way out of the now-collapsing Other Side. Elena and Damon drive into the gas-filled Mystic Grill with most of the travellers in it, blowing it up and killing most of the people in it, including Elena and Damon. She wakes up as a ghost and finds her body, sending her to Bonnie, where she passes to the Other Side, and she and many others are able to pass back to the land of the living afterwards. But the spell that allows this is broken before Damon passes back through, and as Bonnie is the anchor, she is a part of the Other Side and shall, therefore, disappear along with it. This leaves the gang mourning the loss of Damon and Bonnie in the season finale.

==== Season 6 ====
In season six, Elena starts back at Whitmore, and is unable to set foot in her hometown. She is also unable to recover from Damon's death and starts lurking the borders of Mystic Falls in order to grab civilians, drink their blood, then compel them to forget, but as spirit magic no longer works in Mystic Falls, any of her victims who cross into the town remember the ordeal, putting her identity as a vampire at risk when one of her victims, Sarah, comes to town. Elena begs Alaric to compel her to forget that she ever loved Damon, which Alaric is able to do, due to him being an Enhanced Original, with the ability to compel other vampires. She eventually wears him down and asks her friends to never remind her once the compulsion had been done. After a number of failed attempts, Alaric successfully compels her to forget her love for Damon. She however leaves Alaric with some of her reminders of Damon, should she ever need them again. She is told of her former feelings for Damon soon afterwards, but decides to stay the way she is, as she does not want to go back to being unhappy again. She starts to date her classmate, Liam. Once Damon comes back to life, Alaric tries to convince Elena to allow him to undo the compulsion, a decision she is reluctant to make. She eventually decides to have him undo it, but Alaric goes back to being human again after crossing into Mystic Falls, causing him to lose his vampire status (he only stayed alive because his once fatal human injuries were healed), meaning he will not be able to do so. She is then left to finally come face-to-face with Damon and see if she will still feel the same way about him. They eventually rekindle their relationship, Elena takes the cure that Bonnie gave Damon. At Alaric's wedding, Kai ruins their wedding and casts a sleeping spell on Elena, linking her life to Bonnie's. She makes a sacrifice to let Bonnie live out her life until it is her turn. She bids goodbye to her friends and loved ones before parting ways but knows that she will see Damon, Stefan and Caroline again one day.

==== Season 7 ====
Elena does not make an appearance but is heard calling Damon's name when he visits the Armory vault. It was a way of Sybil, the Siren, luring him into a trap. The show then mainly centers on the consequences of Elena's absence, highlighting the strained lonely, and sometimes desperate behavior of Damon as he struggles to move on and refuses to let her go.

==== Season 8 ====
In the final episode, Elena makes an appearance. When a weakened Bonnie dies from the sounding bell, she meets Elena in a dream-like forest. Elena hugs her and wonders if she really has died. Enzo appears and says it is not her time and takes Bonnie back to the world of the living. When Bonnie wakes up, it was Stefan who resuscitated her. Elena, asleep, is then taken to the Mystic Falls High School by Katherine and placed in the boiler room. Stefan tries to rescue Elena, but Katherine has Kai place a spell on the boiler room, so that Elena cannot be taken out. After Bonnie had deflected the hellfire back into the bell, Bonnie passes out. Elena wakes up and wanders the school. Stefan meets up with her. It looks like Bonnie has died, but in fact Elena is still sleeping and Stefan's ghost came to visit her in her dream. He had taken the place of killing Katherine instead of Damon, since Damon is human after Stefan gave him the cure. He came to say goodbye. After a tearful hug and saying goodbye, Stefan goes into the afterlife. Elena finally wakes up because Bonnie has broken the spell over her. Elena reunites with Damon and the rest of the gang. Elena gives Caroline the message Stefan whispered into her ear, saying he did hear her voice message and will love her forever. In the epilogue, Elena continued to study at medical school. After finishing her education, she went back to Mystic Falls and lived together with Damon, happily married for a long time. After living out her life, she crosses over to the afterlife where she finally reunites with her parents, Aunt Jenna and Uncle John.

==== Post-season 8 ====
The penultimate episode of The Originals, "The Tale of Two Wolves", features Elijah and Hope Mikaelson visiting Mystic Falls, where the window of a doctor's office reads "Elena Salvatore, MD", showing that Elena established her own medical practice.

The third season of Legacies reveals that Elena re-built her childhood home and is living there with her husband Damon, and daughter Stefanie.

== Reception ==
Elena has received mainly positive reviews. Steve West of the Cinema Blend compared the story of The Vampire Diaries and the character of Elena to the popular vampire franchise, Twilight, and its protagonist Bella Swan. West said "Clearly Elena is way hotter than Bella, she has two immortal vampires fighting over her". After she transitioned into a vampire, Carina Adly MacKenzie of Zap2it hoped that the "fierce" and "ripper" side of Elena would emerge when "someone messes with the people she loves". McKenzie noted that when a person becomes a vampire, "their strongest personality traits are heightened", and hoped that wouldn't see Elena's "compassion and selflessness" double into "helping old ladies with their groceries and nursing injured animals back to health". Robyn Ross of TV Guide also hoped that after Elena "has had a taste for blood", she would lose control. Prior to her becoming a vampire, Ross thought she was less fun and "slightly boring", and wanted Elena to follow her instinct and "stop protecting everyone's feelings".

Elena's romances with Stefan and Damon have become a popular craze with viewers, who have nicknamed them "Stelena" and "Delena". Andy Swift of the website HollywoodLife praised Elena's relationship with Damon, which was a combination of real love and a sired bond, hoping they would live "happily ever after". Vlada Gelman of TVLine, however, felt that their romance was "over in a rather mature way for a young love triangle" and questioned whether Elena was "ready to jump into a relationship with Damon right away" while Stefan was still in the picture.

== Merchandising ==
Tonner Doll Company, Inc. created dolls for Elena and Katherine along with Stefan and Damon, from 1864.
