= The Sun Also Rises (The Vampire Diaries) =

- The Vampire Diaries episode
- Episode no.: Season 2 Episode 21
- Directed by: Paul M. Sommers
- Written by: Caroline Dries; Mike Daniels
- Cinematography by: Patrick Cady
- Editing by: Jacques Gravett
- Production code: 2J5271
- Original air date: May 5, 2011

Guest appearances
- Daniel Gillies as Elijah Mikaelson; David Anders as John Gilbert; Joseph Morgan as Klaus Mikaelson; Michaela McManus as Jules; Lisa Tucker as Greta Martin

Episode chronology
← Previous "The Last Day"	Next → "As I Lay Dying"
- The Vampire Diaries season 2

"The Sun Also Rises" is the twenty-first episode of the second season of the American supernatural teen drama television series The Vampire Diaries, and the 43rd of the series. It aired on The CW on May 5, 2011. The episode was written by supervising producer Caroline Dries and co-producer Mike Daniels, and directed by Paul M. Sommers.

== Plot ==
Caroline (Candice Accola) and Matt (Zach Roerig) are still trapped while Tyler (Michael Trevino), in his werewolf form, tries to kill them. Matt shoots him with the wooden bullets so he and Caroline can escape while Elena (Nina Dobrev) tries to explain to Jenna (Sara Canning) what is happening and that she is transitioning into a vampire. Greta (Lisa Tucker) comes to complete the transition offering Jenna her blood. Jenna tries but cannot resist and she drinks it.

Stefan (Paul Wesley), Alaric (Matt Davis), and Elijah (Daniel Gillies) are headed to meet Bonnie (Kat Graham) so they can start their plan to kill Klaus (Joseph Morgan) when Damon (Ian Somerhalder) calls Stefan to tell him that Klaus has Jenna and he is going to use her as the vampire for the ritual. At the same time, Greta prepares everything for the ritual on Klaus' orders. Klaus hands her the moonstone and the ritual starts with Klaus killing Jules (Michaela McManus) first.

Matt reveals to Caroline that he knows about her and that he was on vervain when he asked her to compel him. He also reveals her that her mother knows everything and she is trying to figure out what to do since she grew up hating vampires. While they talk, Tyler gets outside of the house and back to his human form and Caroline helps him.

Alaric, Stefan, and Elijah get to Bonnie and Jeremy (Steven R. McQueen) where Alaric tells Jeremy about Jenna and Stefan tells Bonnie that he will ask Klaus to let him take Jenna's place in the ritual. Stefan talks to Elijah, asking him if he can trust him since Klaus is his brother and Stefan himself had many opportunities to kill Damon but he never could. Elijah tells Stefan that he had other siblings too and Klaus took them away from him. Stefan realizes that Elijah wants revenge and he leaves.

Damon gets mad when he learns about Stefan's decision and along with Jeremy, Bonnie, and John (David Anders) tries to find a way to save Jenna and Elena from becoming a vampire. Stefan arrives at the ritual site and talks with Klaus about his offer. Jenna tries to use her vampire power to hear what Stefan and Klaus are talking about and hears that Stefan wants to take her place. Klaus, however, does not accept Stefan's offer and Greta continues with the ritual. Jenna tries to kill Greta but Klaus intervenes and succeeds in killing her.

Bonnie leaves with Damon to go to Klaus, trapping Jeremy and Alaric in the cave to keep them safe. Before they go, Bonnie also casts a spell on John to make sure that Elena will not come back as a vampire. Klaus completes his ritual by drinking Elena's blood and the moment his transition into a hybrid starts, Bonnie appears and attacks him while Damon kills Greta and takes Elena's body away. While Klaus is down, Elijah comes to kill him but the last moment, Klaus tells him that the bodies of their family are safe and if he kills him he will never know where they are. That makes Elijah change his mind and he spares Klaus' life, taking him away from the ritual site.

Damon brings Elena back to where Alaric, Jeremy, and John are. A little bit later she wakes up as human while John dies in her place because of the spell Bonnie has cast. Jeremy gives Elena a letter from John where he tells her that he loves her no matter if she is now still a human or a vampire. After Jenna and John's funeral, Damon reveals to Stefan that Tyler bit him in his werewolf form, and that he will die soon. They decide that they need to find a way to kill Klaus, and quickly.

== Feature music ==
In "The Sun Also Rises" we can hear the songs:

- "Skinny Love" by Birdy
- "It's Passion and Danger" by Michael Suby
- “Turn To Stone” by Ingrid Michaelson

== Reception ==
=== Ratings ===
In its original American broadcast, "The Sun Also Rises" was watched by 2.84 million; up by 0.16 from the previous episode.

=== Reviews ===
"The Sun Also Rises" received positive reviews.

Carrie Raisler from The A.V. Club gave the episode an A rating stating that the story structure of the past few episode was kind of genius. "If asked to describe The Vampire Diaries as either a plot or character-driven show, I would invariably respond with plot. After all, it's the machinations, the twists and the turns, the reveals and the double crosses that distinguish the show as one of the most entertaining and unpredictable airing today. What was abundantly clear in "The Sun Also Rises," however, is how stealthily the writers have built something with so much more meaning than simply story mechanics over these past two years."

E. Reagan of The TV Chick gave the episode an A rating saying that the episode was magnificent. "I was loving all of the characters in this episode as I think we were really seeing most everyone at their best. Elena holding her crap together in bad circumstances, Stefan being sacrificial, Bonnie kicking butt, Jenna finally serving a purpose, etc."

Emma Fraser from TV Overmind gave the episode an A rating saying that the episode was emotionally draining but fantastic. "The ritual that has been discussed for much of the season finally went down, and once again this show stepped it up another notch in this already action packed season."

Steve Marsi of TV Fanatic rated the episode with 5/5. "The action never ceased, the shockers kept coming and the death toll rose, which was sad to watch in a sense, but befitting of an episode devoted to Klaus and the sacrifice ritual."

Robin Franson Pruter from Forced Viewing rated the episode with 4/4 saying that overall the episode is a strong one and that the season reached its climax as Klaus completed the sacrifice ritual. "The penultimate episode of the season feels a lot like a season finale. This episode contains the culmination of the season-long arc (the sacrifice ritual). One regular (Aunt Jenna) and one major recurring character (Uncle John) are killed off. And the episode ends on what could be a season cliffhanger—a major character (Damon) is fatally wounded (werewolf bite)."

Diana Steenbergen of IGN rated the episode with 9/10 saying that the ritual that had been built up the entire season more than lived up to expectations. "The stakes were high and the outcome heartbreaking. Surrounded by rings of fire, Elena, Jenna and Jules were trapped, forced to wait as Klaus killed them off one by one."

Meg from Two Cents TV gave a good review to the episode saying that it was amazing. "Sacrifices, deaths, betrayals, shocks, secrets – this episode had everything."
