= The Last Day (The Vampire Diaries) =

- The Vampire Diaries episode
- Episode no.: Season 2 Episode 20
- Directed by: J. Miller Tobin
- Written by: Andrew Chambliss; Brian Young
- Cinematography by: Patrick Cady
- Editing by: Sean Albertson
- Production code: 2J5270
- Original air date: April 28, 2011

Guest appearances
- Daniel Gillies as Elijah Mikaelson; Joseph Morgan as Klaus Mikaelson; Michaela McManus as Jules; Marguerite MacIntyre as Liz Forbes; Lisa Tucker as Greta Martin; Gino Anthony Pesi as Maddox

Episode chronology
← Previous "Klaus"	Next → "The Sun Also Rises"
- The Vampire Diaries season 2

"The Last Day" is the twentieth episode of the second season of the American supernatural teen drama television series The Vampire Diaries, and the 42nd of the series. It aired on The CW on April 28, 2011. The episode was written by executive story editor Andrew Chambliss and story editor Brian Young, and directed by J. Miller Tobin.

== Plot ==
Elijah (Daniel Gillies) explains the curse to Elena (Nina Dobrev), Stefan (Paul Wesley) and Damon (Ian Somerhalder) and what is needed. A witch to cast the spell, a sacrifice of a werewolf and a vampire and Klaus to drink the doppelganger's blood. Elijah has an elixir that will bring Elena back to life but he cannot reassure them that the elixir will work. Damon does not like the plan and prefers to go with the original one where Bonnie will kill Klaus, but Elena does not agree.

Alaric (Matt Davis) gets to the Salvatore house but Jenna does not believe that Alaric is really Alaric and holds a cross bow at him. Alaric proves to Jenna that he is himself by saying what happened on the first night they spent together but Jenna stops him as what he was going to say was inappropriate. Afterwards, Alaric delivers a message from Klaus (Joseph Morgan); the sacrifice happens tonight. At the same time, Maddox (Gino Anthony Pesi) makes Carol (Susan Walters) call Tyler (Michael Trevino) to tell him that she had an accident and she is in the hospital, to make him come back home.

Damon forces Elena to drink his blood to make sure that when she dies at the sacrifice she will come back to life as a vampire, something that makes Stefan furious and the two of them fight. Elijah tells Damon that Elena will never forgive him for what he did. At the same time, Matt (Zach Roerig) tries to convince Liz (Marguerite MacIntyre) that Caroline (Candice Accola) is not evil as she thinks and that Damon is the one she should focus on but Liz still believes that all vampires are monsters.

Tyler gets back home to check on his mom but Jules (Michaela McManus) tells him that they have to leave town before tonight. On their way they run into Caroline and Jules leaves them alone to talk. While they are talking, Maddox and Greta (Lisa Tucker) knock them down and take them away. They wake up at the tomb where Caroline explains to Tyler who Klaus is and what he wants to do.

Klaus meets Damon at the Grill to tell him that he has everything he needs for the ritual and he asks him not to do anything stupid and try to stop him. Damon goes to Katherine and finds out that she is not the vampire Klaus is planning on using for the ritual but Caroline. Damon also learns that Klaus has Tyler and he makes Katherine tell him where Klaus is keeping them.

Damon goes to the tomb to free Caroline but Maddox is there and stops him. While they fight, Matt appears and shoots Maddox saving Damon's life. Damon frees Caroline and Tyler and all of them, along with Matt, leave the tomb. At the same time, Klaus meets Elena and Stefan and asks Elena to go with him so they can start the ritual that will break the curse.

While Caroline, Matt, Damon and Tyler walk away, Tyler starts to transform into a werewolf and tries to attack Caroline but Damon stops him. Caroline and Matt leave while Damon goes to Alaric's apartment to tell Klaus that he has freed Caroline and Tyler and he has to postpone the ritual. Klaus though informs him that he knew that one of the two brothers would try to stop him that is why he had a backup plan; a second witch, a second werewolf and a second vampire. In the meantime, Tyler as a wolf, chases Caroline and Matt forcing them to lock themselves in the Lockwood cave to stay safe.

Elena arrives with Greta at the place where the ritual is going to be performed to find out that Klaus made Jenna a vampire while Katherine tells Damon that she had to call Jenna; otherwise, Klaus would know that she was on vervain. At the end of the episode, it is revealed that Damon was bitten by Tyler during their fight.

== Feature music ==
In "The Last Day" we can hear the songs:

- "Not" by Cheyenne Mize
- "Wolf Pack" by The Vaccines

== Reception ==
=== Ratings ===
In its original American broadcast, "The Last Day" was watched by 2.68 million; slightly down by 0.02 from the previous episode.

=== Reviews ===
"The Last Day" received positive reviews.

Carrie Raisler from The A.V. Club gave the episode an A rating saying that the episode was full of surprises and jaw-dropping moments.

The TV Chick gave the episode an A rating saying that it was another awesome episode and full of action. "So much action all packed into one episode. On this show, the only characters I think are safe are Damon, Elena, and Stefan. However, that leaves a lot of characters in danger. The writers have shown that pretty much no one is safe."

Robin Franson Pruter of Forced Viewing rated the episode with 4/4 saying that the story threads come together as the characters prepare for the sacrifice ritual. "This first part of the (unofficially) three-part season finale illustrates the strength of the writing on The Vampire Diaries. It successfully blends character and relationship development with plot action. It also manages the difficult feat of pulling off surprising twists that are, in hindsight, completely grounded in the previous events."

Diana Steenbergen from IGN rated the episode with 9.5/10 saying that it was another whirlwind episode. "[The episode] was chock full of surprises, including a couple head-spinning shockers at the end. Just when you thought you knew how things were going to go down, Klaus pulls out a Plan B that no one saw coming."

Steve Marsi of TV Fanatic rated the episode with 4.5/5 saying that it was not his favorite but it was still very strong and heavy on emotion. "The show's propensity for shocking twists in the final moments is something fans know well, but this week's concluding sequence probably left even more jaws on the floor than usual. What had been a slow-building, somewhat melodramatic episode suddenly changed course with not one, but two huge developments heading into next week."
