= Positive Women =

British international development charity

- Founded: 2005
- Headquarters: London/Swansea
- Location: United Kingdom, Eswatini
- Key people: Kathryn Llewellyn, Stephen Brown, Siphiwe Hlophe, Joseph Morgan
- Website: www.positivewomen.org

Positive Women is a registered UK international development charity working in UK and Eswatini. The charity works to improve the lives of women and children affected by the HIV/Aids virus, which is particularly prevalent in Eswatini Positive Women manages and develops a number of projects through its partner NGO Eswatini for Positive Living or ESWAPOL which is based in Manzini, Eswatini. It focuses its efforts on education, income generation and creating healthier communities.

As of 2011, Positive Women has an office in South Wales and a virtual office in London. It has two employees, including its founding CEO Kathryn Llewellyn. Its Director is former Labour Party Campaign Director and NUS UK National Secretary, Stephen Brown.

== History ==
Positive Women was established in 2005 and was formerly known as The Children of Swaziland. Its founder Kathryn Llewellyn changed the name in 2010 and for the first time began employing staff. To date the charity sends over 500 HIV/AIDS orphans to primary school and has established a number of income generation projects, led by women in rural communities. Positive Women is a joint venture between Kathryn Llewellyn and Siphiwe Hlophe who have worked together on issues relating to HIV/AIDS in Swaziland for over 10 years. In 2009 Swaziland had the highest prevalence rate of HIV/AIDS of any country in the world, with over 25% of the population infected

== Programs ==
Social Welfare - Positive Women work with communities to ensure that their basic needs are met. They fund school fees for orphans and vulnerable children and provide home based healthcare.

Income Generation - Positive Women establish income generation projects, usually led by women. These women work in their communities candle making, knitting uniforms or work on agricultural projects to raise income. Positive Women through SWAPOL, run workshops on basic business skills for these women.

Legal Help - Positive Women train traditional leaders in the issues faced by women living with HIV in Swaziland. On occasion they have proceeded with legal cases when women are excluded from their homes after contracting the virus.

== Notable supporters ==
Actor Joseph Morgan is a leading supporter of Positive Women including asking fans to make a donation in honor of his birthday
