= As I Lay Dying (The Vampire Diaries) =

- The Vampire Diaries episode
- Episode no.: Season 2 Episode 22
- Directed by: John Behring
- Written by: Turi Meyer; Al Septien; Michael Narducci
- Cinematography by: Paul M. Sommers (Note: David Geddes is credited with Sommers for additional photography.)
- Editing by: Joshua Butler
- Production code: 2J5272
- Original air date: May 12, 2011

Guest appearances
- Daniel Gillies as Elijah Mikaelson; Joseph Morgan as Klaus Mikaelson; Bianca Lawson as Emily Bennett; Marguerite MacIntyre as Liz Forbes; Malese Jow as Anna

Episode chronology
← Previous "The Sun Also Rises"	Next → "The Birthday"
- The Vampire Diaries season 2

"As I Lay Dying" is the twenty-second and season finale episode of the second season of the American supernatural teen drama television series The Vampire Diaries, and the 44th of the series. It aired on The CW on May 12, 2011. The episode was written by consulting producers Turi Meyer and Al Septien and executive story editor Michael Narducci, while supervising producer John Behring acted as director.

== Plot ==
Elena (Nina Dobrev) tries to deal with Jenna's (Sara Canning) death while Damon (Ian Somerhalder) asks for her forgiveness for feeding her his blood. He admits that he was wrong for doing this but Elena tells him that she needs her time. Damon returns to the Salvatore house and tries to kill himself but Stefan (Paul Wesley) stops him and locks him in the basement telling him that they will find a cure for the werewolf bite.

Elijah (Daniel Gillies) demands from Klaus (Joseph Morgan) to keep his word and tell him where the bodies of their family are but Klaus is not willing to reveal him that info right away. In the meantime, Stefan calls Alaric (Matt Davis) to inform him that Damon is dying and he asks for his help. Then Stefan goes to Bonnie (Kat Graham) so they can ask the dead witches how they can cure Damon. Emily Bennett (Bianca Lawson) talks via Bonnie and tells Stefan that there is nothing he can do but through their conversation, Stefan can see that she is lying. Bonnie comes back and tells Stefan that she heard the witches saying Klaus' name.

Elena, Caroline (Candice Accola) and Jeremy (Steven R. McQueen) try to have a normal day after everything that happened but Stefan comes to tell Elena about Damon and that he needs to go and find Klaus for the cure. In the meantime, Damon starts having illusions because of the werewolf bite. Stefan gets to Alaric's apartment to find Klaus and ask for his help. Klaus arrives with Elijah and while Elijah waits for Klaus to tell him where the rest of his family is, Klaus stabs him with the dagger to “reunite” him with the others.

While Stefan tries to get the cure, Alaric keeps Damon company when Liz (Marguerite MacIntyre) arrives wanting to talk to Damon. Alaric warns her that it is not a good time to do so but she does not listen. Liz gets into the basement cell but Damon knocks her down and escapes searching for Elena. Alaric calls Jeremy, Bonnie and Caroline to find Damon before he finds Elena because he is in bad shape and he will hurt her. Jeremy finds him and the moment he tries to call Alaric, Liz comes and shoots him in her attempt to shoot Damon. Caroline and Bonnie arrive and try to help Jeremy but he is gone. Bonnie takes him to the cave and asks the dead witches to help her bring him back to life. The witches are angry with her and tell her that there will be consequences if she brings him back to life, but they eventually help her and Jeremy comes back to life. Caroline tells Liz that Jeremy is fine and she also tells her that she is still her daughter and nothing changed even if she is a vampire now.

Klaus shows Stefan that his blood (hybrid blood) is the cure to the werewolf bite (Note: Klaus' blood is not the only cure to a werewolf bite, as seen on episode 22 of season 6 when Kai Parker siphoned off Tyler Lockwood's werewolf bite magic-toxin. Special Gemini witches, specifically siphon witches can use their siphoning abilities to their advantage to siphon off werewolf magic from the toxin and neutralise it, thus healing a werewolf bite.) but he wants to make a deal with Stefan first before giving it to him; if Stefan wants to save his brother he has to do whatever Klaus tells him for ten years. Stefan agrees to the deal even if he does not want to. After the agreement, Klaus starts feeding him human blood to make him a ripper again and when he is sure that Stefan will follow him, he gives Katherine the cure and compels her to take it to Damon letting her go.

In the meantime, Elena finds Damon wandering and tries to help him but he bites her thinking that she is Katherine. He stops in time before he kills her and Elena takes him back to the Salvatore house. Damon admits that he loves her and Elena kisses him when Katherine arrives with Klaus’ blood. Damon drinks it and gets healed while Katherine informs them that Stefan sacrificed everything to save his brother and he will leave town with Klaus.

The episode ends with Jeremy seeing Vicki (Kayla Ewell) and Anna's (Malese Jow) ghosts.

== Feature Music ==
In "As I Lay Dying" we can hear the songs:

- "Ship of Fools" by Jamie Dunlap, Marc Ferrari, Molly Pasutti and Scott Nickoley
- "Turn To Stone" by Ingrid Michaelson
- "Speakers" by Days Difference
- "Holding A Heart" by Girl Named Toby
- "I Should Go" by Levi Kreis

== Reception ==
=== Ratings ===
In its original American broadcast, "As I Lay Dying" was watched by 2.86 million; slightly up by 0.02 from the previous episode.

=== Reviews ===
"As I Lay Dying" received positive reviews.

Emma Fraser from TV Overmind gave the episode an A+ rating saying that the season finale was epic. "After last weeks bloodbath it was hard to see how The Vampire Diaries team would top that level of emotion and tension, and leave us with a finale that was as epic as last years. I’m pretty sure they just did that and then some. [...] There is still much to process from this finale including the all round terrific performances and excellent work from all of The Vampire Diaries team. I thought it would be hard to top last weeks episode and the season 1 finale but I think they did it."

E. Reagan of The TV Chick gave the episode an A rating saying that it was a great finale and set up for the next season. "The last few episodes have been stellar for sure. [...] There were some great moments in this episode that tugged the heart strings: Stefan’s sacrifice for his brother (a little questionable though), Caroline and her mom, Bonnie and Jeremy, Alaric as a caregiver, everything Elena and Damon. Really good stuff."

Carrie Raisler from The A.V. Club gave the episode a B+ rating saying that having The Sun Also Rises as the penultimate episode of the season was a big risk since the epic confrontation paid off all of the fan anticipation before the finale. "Although not everything in the finale worked, there was a heck of a lot of good. [...] Overall, I think this was a really good episode of The Vampire Diaries, if not quite as powerful as last season’s finale or even last week’s episode. There are two main ways to approach a finale: the wrap up or the set up. This, unquestionably, was a set up episode, which makes perfect sense considering the show thrives on forward momentum."

Matt Richenthal of TV Fanatic rated the episode with 5/5 saying that the season finale was all about choice. "And the answer [to how Damon would be saved] was an exchange I never saw coming, just one of many choices that highlighted "As I Lay Dying.""

Robin Franson Pruter from Forced Viewing rated the episode with 4/4 saying that it was another excellent season finale. "What makes The Vampire Diaries a strong show is that the characters don’t seem as if they’re being manipulated by a behind the scenes puppet-master to create drama. The drama stems naturally from the characters themselves. [...] The Vampire Diaries also manages to maintain its premise without becoming stale. The love triangle is still there, but, with Stefan as a Ripper, the dynamics will be different. Consistently having character-driven plots and keeping a premise fresh are two qualities great shows often fail at achieving. That The Vampire Diaries does show these qualities is rarely appreciated."

Diana Steenbergen of IGN rated the episode with 9/10 saying that the episode seemed almost calm compared to last week's. "To judge just by the death count would be a mistake however; the bombs that were dropped in the season finale may not have resulted in any (permanent) deaths, but the consequences promise to be far-reaching."
