= As I Lay Dying (disambiguation) =

As I Lay Dying is a 1930 novel by William Faulkner.

As I Lay Dying may also refer to:

- As I Lay Dying (band), an American metalcore band
- As I Lay Dying (film), a 2013 film adaptation of the novel
- "As I Lay Dying" (The Vampire Diaries), an episode of the television series The Vampire Diaries
- As I Lay Dying, the later name of the Austrian extreme metal band Visceral Evisceration

== See also ==
- As I Lay Dying / American Tragedy, a 2002 split album from As I Lay Dying and American Tragedy
