= Klaus (The Vampire Diaries) =

- The Vampire Diaries episode
- Episode no.: Season 2 Episode 19
- Directed by: Joshua Butler
- Written by: Kevin Williamson; Julie Plec
- Cinematography by: Paul M. Sommers
- Editing by: Joshua Butler
- Production code: 2J5269
- Original air date: April 21, 2011

Guest appearances
- Daniel Gillies as Elijah Mikaelson; Joseph Morgan as Klaus Mikaelson; Trent Ford as Trevor; Dawn Olivieri as Andie Star; Lisa Tucker as Greta Martin; Gino Anthony Pesi as Maddox

Episode chronology
← Previous "The Last Dance"	Next → "The Last Day"
- The Vampire Diaries season 2

"Klaus" is the nineteenth episode of the second season of the American supernatural teen drama television series The Vampire Diaries, and the 41st of the series. It aired on The CW on April 21, 2011. The episode was written by Kevin Williamson and Julie Plec, and directed by Joshua Butler.

== Plot ==
Elijah (Daniel Gillies) wakes up in the Salvatore basement after Elena (Nina Dobrev) removes the dagger from his body. Elena tells him to keep quiet so Damon (Ian Somerhalder) and Stefan (Paul Wesley) will not hear him. Elijah needs to get out of the house since he is not invited in, and Elena, to convince him that he can trust her, hands him the dagger. Stefan wakes up the next morning and discovers that Elijah's body is gone while at the same time, Klaus needs his real body and asks Maddox (Gino Anthony Pesi) to take care of it.

Stefan calls Elena to see if she is okay and asks her where Elijah is. Elena reassures him that she is fine and that Elijah is with her, asking Stefan to trust her and let her do what she thinks best. Stefan, even though he does not agree with her plan, agrees, making Damon unhappy. Elijah explains to Elena how he and Klaus met Katherine and that Klaus is his brother.

Jenna (Sara Canning) returns home after all the messages "Elena" left her about staying away from Alaric and calls Stefan to ask what is wrong. Stefan goes to meet her, only to find out that Alaric/Klaus is already there waiting for him. Damon goes to Alaric's apartment with Andie (Dawn Olivieri) to see if Katherine is there. When they find her, Damon gives her vervain to drink so that Klaus will not be able to compel her.

Elijah continues to tell Elena the story of his family, and he reveals her that the curse of the sun and the moon is fake. Klaus and Elijah made that curse up, but there is another curse that is worse and it is on Klaus. That is the curse Klaus wants to break. At the same time, Alaric/Klaus tells Jenna about vampires but Jenna does not believe him. When she attempts to leave, Klaus tries to stop her, and Stefan attacks Klaus, giving Jenna the opportunity to escape. Stefan calls Elena to let her know that Jenna knows the truth, and Elena leaves Elijah to go to Jenna. In a flashback, we see that Elijah was in love with Katherine back in 1492.

Elena tries to calm Jenna down and tells her the whole truth. Then, she goes back to Elijah, asking him to tell her about the curse. Elijah tells her that his mother was unfaithful to his father and Klaus is a brother from another father, a werewolf, something that makes Klaus both a vampire and a werewolf. Klaus wants to break the curse that is upon him so he can reawaken his werewolf side and create an army of hybrids. Since Klaus is both a vampire and a werewolf, Elijah explains Elena that the dagger cannot kill him, and they have to try to do it using a witch when Klaus is on transition, a moment that makes him weak. Elena tells him that she knows a witch that can channel the power they need, and Elijah tells her that the curse needs to be broken during a full moon.

Through another flashback, we see that Elijah found a way to protect the life of the doppelgänger during the sacrifice, meaning he can protect Elena's life. Katherine did not know about that; that is why she ran away from Klaus when she found out what he wanted her for. Elena and Elijah go to the Salvatore house to find Damon and Stefan fighting. Elijah asks for their apology since they tried to kill him; Stefan apologizes but Damon does not trust Elijah. Stefan explains to Elijah that Damon is angry with him at the moment but he will come around at the end and work with them.

The episode ends with Klaus (Joseph Morgan) taking his real body back.

== Feature music ==
In "Klaus" we can hear the songs:

- "Compulsion" by Doves
- "Get Some" by Lykke Li
- "Helena Beat" by Foster the People

== Reception ==
=== Ratings ===
In its original American broadcast, "Klaus" was watched by 2.70 million; down by 0.11 from the previous episode.

=== Reviews ===
"Klaus" received positive reviews.

Carrie Raisler from The A.V. Club gave the episode and A− rating saying that the episode was overall entertaining. "This show has that makes it great, and that’s guts. Not many shows would have the stones to dismiss their entire season’s mythology as false only a few short weeks before the finale. This demonstrates the writers' extreme confidence not only in the story they are telling but also the inherent entertainment factor of all the episodes leading up to the big reveal."

E. Reagan of The TV Chick gave the episode and A− rating saying that it was very informative. "There was obviously not a ton of plot movement, but some for sure. However, we learned an incredible amount of information. I can honestly say that I didn’t see it coming about the Klaus vamp/werewolf thing. Nice work people."

Steve Marsi from TV Fanatic rated the episode with 5/5 saying that the episode was stunning and might have been the best to date. "[The episode] delivered so much mythology, but in a way that didn't come off as forced and certainly didn't feel like a letdown. On the contrary, everything about last night felt epic."

Diana Steenbergen of IGN rated the episode with 8/10 saying that the episode felt like a dump of information "but as usual, there were plenty of twists and turns to keep our heads spinning. Season 2 is definitely coming to a boil."

Robin Franson Pruter from Forced Viewing rated the episode with 3/4 saying that this episode was not easy. "There are complex things going on with the characters, with the relationships between brothers, and with the mythology of the show. It demands and rewards close attention. The episode is not perfect. Someone searching for flaws can find a number of big ones. But it’s compelling, and it builds anticipation for the final showdown with Klaus, which is what it needs to do."

== See also ==
- The Originals (The Vampire Diaries)
