= Siphiwe Hlophe =

Siphiwe Hlophe is the co-founder of Swaziland for Positive Living, an NGO that provides counselling and education, and seeks to improve the living conditions of people who are affected by or infected with HIV in the rural areas. The organisation has been described as "Swaziland's most innovative and motivated HIV/AIDS mitigation programme". She is also the President of Positive Women, a UK-based charity founded by Kathryn Llewellyn and Stephen Brown

In 1999 Siphiwe Hlophe was working as a manager in a hotel chain when she won a scholarship to study agricultural economics at Bradford University. A condition of the scholarship was that she took an HIV test, the result of which showed her to be HIV-positive, after which her husband left her, and she lost her scholarship. This showed the stigma that is attached to HIV in Swaziland, and spurred Siphiwe Hlophe on to co-found SWAPOL to help others in similar situations. Siphiwe was one of the first women to publicly declare her positive HIV status. "It [SWAPOL]was forged from the suffering our the founding members. That may be why people respond to what we are doing, and we are getting so many requests to help communities where HIV is rampant. We are not an NGO that works out of a plush office. We are people who know what it means to face discrimination and rejection, but who have the will to live", says Siphiwe Hlophe.

Siphiwe Hlophe has four children, the eldest 30 years old and the youngest 19.
