= List of Legacies episodes =

Legacies is an American fantasy drama television series, created by Julie Plec, that premiered on The CW on October 25, 2018. It is a spin-off of The Originals and features characters from both that series and its predecessor, The Vampire Diaries. On February 3, 2021, the series was renewed for a fourth season, which premiered on October 14, 2021. On May 12, 2022, it was reported that the fourth season would be its last season. During the course of the series, 68 episodes of Legacies aired over four seasons, between October 25, 2018, and June 16, 2022.

== Series overview ==
Season	Episodes	Originally released	
Season	Episodes	First released	Last released
1	16	October 25, 2018	March 28, 2019
2	16	October 10, 2019	March 26, 2020
3	16	January 21, 2021	June 24, 2021
4	20	October 14, 2021	June 16, 2022

== Episodes ==
=== Season 1 (2018–19) ===
No. overall	No. in season	Title	Directed by	Written by	Original release date	Prod. code	U.S. viewers (millions)
1	1	"This Is the Part Where You Run"	Chris Grismer	Julie Plec	October 25, 2018	T46.10051	1.12
Hope Mikaelson, a student at the Salvatore School for the Young and Gifted, assists her headmaster, Alaric Saltzman, in recruiting werewolf, Rafael, to the school. In the process, Hope runs into her old friend Landon, who is also Rafael's foster brother, but since the school for the supernatural is deemed to be too dangerous for humans, Landon is turned away. When vampire student, MG, fails to compel Landon to forget his knowledge of the supernatural, it is assumed Landon has ingested vervain. Landon is locked up in a cell until it can clear his system. Hope visits Landon in his cell while Alaric's daughters Josie and Lizzie give Rafael a tour of the school. Hope tells Landon the truth about her supernatural origins. Knowing his memory will be erased, Landon kisses her. After Landon leaves, it is revealed the compulsions have still not worked and he stole a knife from the school before he left. Hope enlists Josie to help her locate the knife and Landon. Landon's bus explodes and as Sheriff Matt Donovan evaluates the crime scene, Alaric deduces it was Landon, who is missing, must be some kind of supernatural being. Hope vows to track him down.
2	2	"Some People Just Want to Watch the World Burn"	Michael A. Allowitz	Brett Matthews & Julie Plec	November 1, 2018	T46.10052	1.13
After using black magic to find Landon, Hope is forced to see the guidance counselor, but covers for Josie. Busy searching for Landon with Hope and Rafael, Alaric is unable to attend the flag football game against Mystic Falls High and orders the students to lose the game to retain the school's cover. The search uncovers another survivor of the bus explosion. While Alaric gets her to safety, Hope and Rafael find Landon, who swears he is not responsible for the bus, which Alaric corroborates when the woman starts breathing fire. Alaric initially believes her to be a pyromancer, but she is later identified to be a dragon. Landon denies any memory of taking the knife and says he lost it, but the woman tries to get it from him. Tired of being bullied by the other team, the students start using their powers, but Josie sabotages them to ensure their loss. After shifting into its full form, Hope takes down the dragon with black magic and Alaric kills it with the knife before scolding Hope. Rafael and Landon split, but Landon leaves Hope a note apologizing for everything.
3	3	"We're Being Punked, Pedro"	Carol Banker	Julie Plec & Sherman Payne	November 8, 2018	T46.10053	1.09
Alaric assigns the students community service as punishment for the fight broke out after the game, for which Lizzie blames Josie and Alaric. Hope is also there for using black magic, and starts to bond with Josie. After confronting Alaric, Lizzie is reassigned to the gardens, where she is scratched by a gargoyle and left paralyzed. Josie senses something is wrong with Lizzie and she and Hope return to the school. Rafael and Landon try to make it on their own in the woods, with Rafael using his powers to make money, but Landon shields him from a threatening message on one of the bills. Alaric discovers the gargoyle is the protector of the knife Landon stole, but only from supernatural creatures, meaning it will not hurt humans. Hope and Josie combine their powers to make the gargoyle explode. Jeremy Gilbert saves Rafael and Landon from a werewolf hunter and brings them back to the school. Hope and Landon see one another, but Hope walks away without saying a word. Mystic Falls students Dana, Sasha, and Connor plan to deface the Salvatore School, but are attacked by an unseen being.
4	4	"Hope Is Not the Goal"	Chris Grismer	Teleplay by : Bryce Ahart & Stephanie McFarlane; Story by : Brett Mathews	November 15, 2018	T46.10054	1.08
After Dana and Sasha are reported missing, Alaric sends some students undercover to Mystic Falls High to gather intel. Looking to prove his worth with his knowledge of the school, Landon accompanies them to Hope's annoyance. Alaric and Matt discover Dana's body, but it disappears when they look away. MG reveals fellow vampire student Kaleb has been feeding on Dana and other humans, making the others suspect Kaleb is responsible for the girls' disappearance, which Kaleb denies. Dana emerges from the woods and is met by the Salvatore students, she begins puking violently and ultimately dies. Josie helps Rafael calm down after being harassed by the werewolf pack. They discover Sasha trapped in a web which they get trapped in as well. Josie frees them by siphoning magic from Rafael's kiss. Josie, Hope, and Lizzie fight the shape-shifting arachne together and Josie encourages Alaric to add offensive magic to the curriculum. Rafael is accepted into the pack and Matt confronts Kaleb about him feeding on humans, but Alaric decides to handle it internally. Alaric calls his associate Dorian to tell him it is safe to return with the knife, but Dorian is confronted by another creature.
5	5	"Malivore"	Michael Karasick	Thomas Brandon & Penny Cox	November 29, 2018	T46.10055	1.01
Alaric agrees to hold elections for a student honor council consisting of one representative from each supernatural faction before leaving to meet with Dorian. Rafael seeks out each of the front-runners for confirmation they will let Landon stay at the school. Lizzie and MG agree, but Jed refuses. Rafael challenges him for the title of alpha and wins, which also earns him the votes to be the werewolf representative. Josie is elected for the witches thanks to her ex Penelope's campaigning. Kaleb is elected for the vampires. Alaric and Dorian catch a dryad, who tells them she is looking for her lover, a vampire named Oliver. They find Oliver, but he does not remember her. Hope does not find evidence Landon is supernatural. After Jed attacks Landon, Hope votes against Landon staying along with Kaleb and Josie. Upset with Josie, Rafael finally gives in to Lizzie's advances. Hope sends Landon to a contact in New Orleans and they kiss goodbye. Dorian kills the dryad, who explains her desire to find the knife and take it to a place called Malivore. A picture of Landon's biological mother shows her wearing a necklace with the Malivore symbol.
6	6	"Mombie Dearest"	Geoffrey Wing Shotz	Marguerite MacIntyre	December 6, 2018	T46.10056	1.18
Caroline Forbes calls and informs Alaric she cannot attend their daughters' 16th birthday party due to her "recruiting" mission. Alaric is confronted by his deceased ex-fiancée and the biological mother of his twins, Jo Laughlin. Alaric is skeptical, but their twins burst into his office and Josie instantly recognizes their mother. Hope apologizes to Rafael for sending Landon away and teaches Rafael to dance in preparation for his date with Lizzie. Penelope locks Hope and Rafael in the gym so MG can step in to be Lizzie's date. Hope and Rafael escape the gym. Rafael confesses to Lizzie sleeping together was a mistake. On their way to the party, Jo becomes a full-blown zombie and buries Josie alive. Hope, MG, and Penelope rescue Josie. Jo has the girls siphon the magic from her, thus removing her life force. Before she dies, Jo learns Alaric has not told their daughters about what happens when they turn 22 and Caroline is searching for a solution. Josie expresses her disdain for what Penelope did before they share a passionate kiss. Alaric confronts the one who raised Jo from the dead, the Necromancer.
7	7	"Death Keeps Knocking on My Door"	Angela Gomes	Julie Plec	December 13, 2018	T46.10057	1.05
The Necromancer causes Rafael's deceased girlfriend Cassie to return on Remembrance Day. As Alaric's torturing yields no new information, Hope recruits MG to help her enter the Necromancer's mind. Hope finds herself in Rousseau's, a bar in New Orleans. She is trapped in a void and confesses she wants to know about her father. The Necromancer informs Hope that Klaus Mikaelson will not find peace until she does. MG panics and calls Alaric. Once Hope regains consciousness, she and Alaric argue over his alcoholism and her recklessness stemming from her repressed grief. Hope locks Alaric in his office and the Necromancer tells her he remembers the knife is one of the three locks of Malivore, and sent Cassie to steal it. Kaleb tries to teach MG how to feed on humans, but MG struggles to stop. Rafael makes peace with Cassie's death and Hope finally processes her grief for her father. Dorian reveals he takes off every Remembrance Day in honor of his family who were killed by Stefan Salvatore, the namesake of the school. Hope gets an emergency alert from Landon as someone discovers a photo of him and his mother.
8	8	"Maybe I Should Start from the End"	Nathan Hope	Brett Matthews	January 24, 2019	T46.10058	1.01
Landon finds his mother, Seylah Chelon, and triggers the magical alert just before she knocks him out. While Seylah interrogates Landon, a merman attacks them. They escape with Hope and Alaric in pursuit, who learn a clandestine government agency is also looking for Seylah. Seylah accepts Landon is her son and reveals she once worked for the agency, bringing monsters to a facility containing a puddle of black goo. Anyone dropped into the goo would end up in Malivore, with all memories of them wiped from the public consciousness. When Seylah started asking questions, she was thrown into Malivore, too. She later found herself free and pregnant, eventually placing the baby into foster care. The merman tracks them to a motel and takes an Egyptian urn, revealed to be the second Malivore key, but he is killed before he can use it. Seylah helps Landon by returning to Malivore. Hope, whose memories are mysteriously intact, recounts the day's events to Alaric. They resolve to keep the urn safe while Hope and Landon officially become a couple. A government agent finds the photo of Seylah holding baby Landon and disposes of a witness into Malivore.
9	9	"What Was Hope Doing in Your Dreams?"	Darren Grant	Penny Cox	January 31, 2019	T46.10063	1.01
Anticipating the arrival of another monster, Alaric gives the students the option to evacuate to the Lockwood Mansion, but some stay to prepare for their upcoming exams. Rafael has a dream of kissing Hope, being belted by an old foster father, and a woman demanding the urn. He wakes up with marks on his body and Alaric deduces they are dealing with a night hag, a creature makes contact through dreams. As the students try to keep themselves awake, Landon has a nightmare in class and stabs himself awake. Avoiding telling Landon about his mother, Hope stays awake by sparring with Rafael. Landon discovers this because their injuries are carrying over to the real world. They are actually dealing with a dream demon. He, Rafael, Kaleb, and MG go to sleep to lure the demon into the real world. Hope and Alaric kill it. Realizing he has feelings for Hope, Rafael tells her they cannot talk like they have been anymore. Respecting her need to have secrets, Landon tells Hope he will keep working to be someone she can confide in. After researching Seylah, the government agent visits Landon and Rafael's old foster parents.
10	10	"There's a World Where Your Dreams Came True"	John Hyams	Brett Matthews & Josh Schaer	February 7, 2019	T46.10062	1.15
A jinni named Ablah fulfills Lizzie's wish so Hope had never come to Mystic Falls. In the new reality, Klaus never finances the Salvatore School, leaving it in poor condition with few students. Following a magical signal, the Saltzmans go to New Orleans and find Hope as a ripper. Alaric brings her to the school. Annoyed, Lizzie wishes the Salvatore School had never existed. As a result, she and Josie go to Mystic Falls High, where Alaric is an alcoholic history teacher, Josie is popular, and Lizzie is a social outcast. Lizzie has a public magical meltdown, and the Saltzmans are taken to the Mikaelson School, where Hope offers Alaric the headmaster position. Dissatisfied, Lizzie uses her third wish is Hope was never born. She awakens in the midst of a war between humans and supernaturals and learns she killed Josie after learning twins born to the Gemini Coven must eventually turn on one another in the Merge. Ablah offers Lizzie another wish in exchange for the urn. Instead, Lizzie wishes Ablah had never ended up in Malivore, freeing the jinni and reestablishing the status quo. However, Lizzie has no memory of these events.
11	11	"We're Gonna Need a Spotlight"	Barbara Brown	Thomas Brandon & Penny Cox	February 21, 2019	T46.10059	0.71
A protection spell for the urn traps a unicorn, which is actually hosting a slug creature. Hope becomes infected and, with lowered inhibitions, becomes happier and even excited for the upcoming talent show. Another slug is transferred to Josie, who stands up to Lizzie's dictating of the witches' routine. While trying to convince Landon they should take the urn, Hope accidentally electrically shocks herself, ejecting the slug. They kill it and go to Dorian who also finds the deceased unicorn. Fed up with Lizzie, Josie and Penelope, also infected, seek out the urn. At a bar, Alaric asks Emma out, but she says she is seeing someone. After karaoke, they are informed about the slugs from Dorian. They make out before shocking themselves, but only Emma ejects a slug. They return to the school to find nearly everyone infected. Rafael delivers a spoken word poem, making Landon realize his feelings for Hope. Emma magically shocks the students and they stomp the slugs. The witches win the talent show do-over with Josie as their star and Landon privately serenades Hope. After discovering Dorian is the other man Emma is seeing, Alaric unknowingly drinks a slug and throws the urn into a river.
12	12	"There's a Mummy on Main Street"	Julie Plec	Marguerite MacIntyre & Sherman Payne	February 28, 2019	T46.10060	0.87
To recover the urn, the Saltzmans, Hope, Kaleb, Dorian, and Emma take a road trip to Maple Hollows. During the trip, Lizzie accuses Hope of ruining another Saltzman family vacation, leaving Hope confused and annoyed. When they arrive in town, they find Clarke, an agent from Triad Industries, and are met with a plague of swarming insects caused by a mummy. After defeating the mummy, Clarke offers Alaric the urn in exchange for Emma and Dorian's lives, forcing Alaric to give him the urn. Kaleb and Alaric talk about how the Salvatore School needs to protect itself more, by getting real blood, and teaching the witches offensive magic. Lizzie continues to berate Hope, this time about Hope allegedly badmouthing Lizzie's years ago, which Hope denies, leading to the revelation Josie facilitated the misunderstanding between the two to cover up the fact she had a crush on Hope. Emma tells Dorian she kissed Alaric, prompting Dorian to punch Alaric and quit. A man tells Clarke their boss Mrs. G wants the urn locked up right away, but instead Clarke kills the guard and tosses the urn into Malivore, setting off a bright explosion of light.
13	13	"The Boy Who Still Has a Lot of Good to Do"	Paul Wesley	Teleplay by : Bryce Ahart & Stephanie McFarlane; Story by : Mark Ryan Walberg	March 7, 2019	T46.10061	0.81
After returning from their trip, Hope, Alaric, and Kaleb discover Landon, Rafael, and MG are missing. In the woods, they find Rafael in human form during the full moon, and he slowly remembers while Alaric and company were away. Landon and Rafael took MG home to his estranged parents for spring break. MG's mother Veronica turned them away before MG could see his dad, explaining his religion does not accept resurrection. MG found his father at the church and discovered he was not even aware MG is alive. His father accepted him until MG revealed himself as a vampire. Devastated, MG compelled his father to forget their interaction, spiraled into his ripper state, and killed Landon. Chained up for the full moon, Rafael eventually breaks loose and bites MG. Alaric and Kaleb find a dying MG and send for Hope, as her blood is the cure to a wolf's bite. Hope collapses upon hearing what MG did, but still gives him her blood. They go to collect Landon's body when it starts to smoke. The corpse bursts info flames and Landon bursts out of a casing of ash, revealing he is a phoenix.
14	14	"Let's Just Finish the Dance"	Geoffrey Wing Shotz	Sherman Payne	March 14, 2019	T46.10064	0.96
As the Salvatore School hosts the annual Miss Mystic Falls Pageant, Hope is still dealing with the trauma of Landon dying when her ex-boyfriend Roman comes to visit. Lizzie drops out of the pageant due to bad blood with the head judge and throws her support behind Hope. Penelope encourages Josie to genuinely compete instead of complying with Lizzie's plan. Labeled a "killer" by his classmates, MG bonds with an unfamiliar girl named Nia. When his visiting mother and Alaric are turned to stone, MG realizes Nia is a gorgon. As Hope and Landon clash over his jealousy of Roman, Penelope tells Landon Hope has been keeping secrets regarding his mother. After unsuccessfully confronting Hope, Landon storms out and is attacked by Nia outside. MG comes to his rescue and Landon agrees they are even. MG interrogates Nia, who says she was threatened into targeting Landon. Between feeling guilty for lying to Landon and discovering her dress was picked out by her father, Hope becomes overwhelmed as she wins Miss Mystic Falls. Before moving to Belgium, Penelope informs Josie about the Merge. Veronica kidnaps Landon and takes him to Agent Clarke at Triad Industries revealing herself to be Mrs. G.
15	15	"I'll Tell You a Story"	Tony Solomons	Thomas Brandon	March 21, 2019	T46.10065	1.00
Clarke tells Landon about Malivore. People were suffering under constant attacks by supernatural creatures. A witch, werewolf, and vampire came together and created a golem to kill and absorb supernatural creatures, except for witches, werewolves, and vampires. The golem, known as Malivore, was so successful it became self-aware and refused to allow its creators to destroy it by making a deal with humans to stop the "triad". Malivore attempted to create more golems, but they were flawed. Clarke reveals he is Landon's half-brother, as he is one of Malivore's "failed" creations and he convinced humans to perform a ritual turned Malivore into its current state. Humans formed the Triad, which turned into Triad Industries. They watch over Malivore, capture supernaturals and throw them into the puddle. Clarke wants to restore Malivore by bringing it the three original objects used to trap it. He reveals Landon is Malivore's son. He convinces his "little brother" to find the final key. Lizzie tries to restore her relationship with Josie. Rafael is suffering blackout because of Hope's potion. Emma takes a sabbatical to convince Alaric to ask for help. He asks Dorian to return. Veronica learns of Clarke's betrayal and sends Triad Agents to attack the school.
16	16	"There's Always a Loophole"	Mary Lou Belli	Brett Matthews	March 28, 2019	T46.10066	0.93
Triad forces occupy the Salvatore school, using a magic-suppressing artifact. They have weapons with bullets made of Malivore mud and search for the chalice. Burr, commander of the forces, shoots Josie, who is dying from the spreading taint. Alaric and Dorian infiltrate the school through a secret tunnel and disable the artifact, allowing the students to fight back. Josie drinks some of Hope's blood, healing her. Rafael turns into a wolf and stops Burr. Alaric asks the student council to decide his future as headmaster. Clarke takes Landon to a Triad warehouse and says he knew Landon would pocket the real key; an arrowhead. The Headless Horseman arrives and takes him and the key to the Triad Facility. Before he throws the arrowhead into Malivore, Hope arrives, and she and Landon manage to kill the Horseman. Clarke arrives and tosses the arrowhead into the puddle, awakening Malivore. Hope kills Landon, realizing her Tribrid blood is the key to stopping the golem. She calls Alaric and asks him to burn all references of her. She uses a mimic spell on Clarke, forcing him to jump with her into the puddle. Landon resurrects and finds Malivore gone. All his memories of Hope erased.

=== Season 2 (2019–20) ===
No. overall	No. in season	Title	Directed by	Written by	Original release date	Prod. code	U.S. viewers (millions)
17	1	"I'll Never Give Up Hope"	Julie Plec	Julie Plec & Brett Matthews	October 10, 2019	T46.10201	0.80
Everyone has forgotten Hope, including Landon, who is purposely killing and reviving himself to try to remember, while also trying to find a spell to change Rafael back to human. MG spends the summer with Kaleb's family in Atlanta, developing an attraction to Kaleb's sister, Kym. Lizzie is in Europe with Caroline, trying to get help for her mental health. Josie stays behind to keep Alaric company, as he is no longer headmaster, and to find out more about the Merge. Josie and Landon grow closer as they spend time together. Hope is stuck inside Malivore with Clarke. As Hope is not a fully activated tribrid (she has yet to die and become a vampire), she failed to completely end Malivore, and Malivore wants Hope out of its system. Clarke tries to leave with her, but Malivore will not allow it. Hope leaves Clarke behind and makes it out of Malivore. She finds Landon kissing Josie and leaves the school, but is then confronted by a monster. Clarke vows to kill Hope, and Malivore releases Clarke. A Red Hooded figure goes into the cemetery and conjures the Triad Symbol on a grave.
18	2	"This Year Will Be Different"	Jeffrey Hunt	Thomas Brandon	October 17, 2019	T46.10202	0.82
School is back in session for the students of the Salvatore School with a new headmaster, Professor Vardemus. Hope has been attending Mystic Falls High, where she meets Maya and Ethan, and runs into a suspicious Alaric, who has become the new principal. Lizzie meets a mysterious person, Sebastian, who has inexplicably appeared at school. Lizzie falls for Sebastian immediately, upsetting MG. Landon becomes popular at school after everyone assumes he destroyed Malivore, putting a strain on his budding relationship with Josie. The school and town fall victim to a cyclops, whom Hope and Alaric defeat. After the fight, Hope has a breakdown after talking with Landon and reveals to Alaric what happened: that she and Landon had an "epic" love, she is Klaus' and Hayley's daughter, and Ric is the closest thing she had to a father. He promises her they will figure it out together. The cloaked man murders a jogger and carves the Triad Symbol into his forehead.
19	3	"You Remind Me of Someone I Used to Know"	Michael A. Allowitz	Brett Matthews & Adam Higgs	October 24, 2019	T46.10203	0.84
Some Mystic Falls High students go to vandalize the Salvatore School. Ethan backs out while another student, Dennis, is attacked by an enormous wolf. Sheriff Mac accuses Hope of the vandalism, but Maya defends her. Alaric and Sheriff Mac become more acquainted with one another. Vardemus orders the students to use their powers judiciously to help win the annual flag football game against Mystic Falls High, worrying Josie they will be exposed. Dorian and Alaric talk to Dennis and theorize he was attacked by a shunka warakin, an extremely large wolf-like creature that eats werewolves. Hope, worried about Rafael, takes Landon to go save him. Vardemus has Josie use a dark magic spell to purposely injure Ethan. This causes Alaric, Vardemus, and both bodies of students to fight. Lizzie reveals to Sebastian she is a witch and he reveals he is a vampire. MG follows Lizzie, and when Lizzie and Sebastian kiss, MG only sees Lizzie and not Sebastian. Landon realizes Malivore's monsters are back.
20	4	"Since When Do You Speak Japanese?"	Geoffrey Wing Shotz	Penny Cox	November 7, 2019	T46.10204	0.79
Kurutta, a samurai demon hunter absorbed by Malivore, awakens. Hope shares with Alaric that monsters are after Landon; Alaric suggests that she transfer to the Salvatore School to protect him. Josie is sick after using dark magic, but Vardemus suggests her power should not be limited. Kurutta is after an oni that has possessed Rafael. MG attempts to show Lizzie that Sebastian is not real by filming her interactions with him. MG disturbs Sebastian and Lizzie's date but reveals to her that Sebastian only exists to her. Hope confesses she and Landon had a relationship to him, but he becomes possessed and knocks her unconscious. Kurutta is killed by an oni-possessed Landon, and Lizzie becomes possessed when she tries to stop Landon from entering Malivore. Lizzie begs Josie to kill her with Kurutta's sword, but Josie is able to siphon it, using its magic to pull the oni from Lizzie and dispatch it. Sebastian confronts MG about why Lizzie cannot see him anymore and now only MG can. Hope plans to close Malivore. Lizzie remembers Hope.
21	5	"Screw Endgame"	Barbara Brown	Brett Matthews & Thomas Brandon	November 14, 2019	T46.10205	0.87
Lizzie and Hope are stopped by a woman from Malivore who says she is the Keeper; she throws the two into a labyrinth fashioned as an alternate version of the 1980s. Sebastian tasks MG and Kaleb with finding his body. The Keeper wants Hope or Lizzie to trade places with her or die at the hands of her pet minotaur. MG finds Sebastian's body and offers to awaken him on the condition that Sebastian will leave town. Alaric advises against awakening him, fearing he is evil. Josie tells Alaric to live his own life away from supernatural beings. Hope offers to stay as the Keeper since nobody will know she is gone, while Lizzie wants to so that she will not have to merge with Josie. Both turn the tables on the Keeper, and all three escape the game. Josie and Landon do not have sex for the first time after Josie finds Penelope's diary (the one that records everything written in Salvatore School) and sees the song he wrote for Hope. Sebastian finds Wade and makes him wake him up. The Keeper encounters Vardemus in a bar and it is revealed that Vardemus is really Clarke.
22	6	"That's Nothing I Had to Remember"	Bola Ogun	Adam Higgs & Josh Eiserike	November 21, 2019	T46.10206	0.86
Josie is in New Orleans at Rousseau's and is approached by Freya Mikaelson. Freya and Keelin have a son, Nik. Josie asks Freya to help her reverse engineer a dark magic spell and says she knows Freya has forgotten someone too and that this spell is the only way they can remember. Kym is visiting. A zombie has made its way to town, who Hope thinks is not from the portal. Rafael and Ethan crush on Hope. Freya confronts Josie about how they both forgot the same person and Josie runs away. Sebastian is back to feeding on civilians and is trapped by Kaleb and MG. The Malivore Monster, a croatoan from the lost Roanoke Colony that seeks out people with secrets, is destroyed with help from Sebastian who had a history with it five hundred years ago. Sheriff Mac believes Alaric is behind the killings; which Alaric rebukes by saying he was with Matt, now mayor. Josie casts the spell and everyone gains their memories back. Landon, upset with Hope for lying, questions what he will do with Josie. Sebastian reveals himself to Lizzie. Freya finds Hope and they reunite. The zombie is grabbed by one of the Red Hoods who links the zombie's blood to the Salvatore School.
23	7	"It Will All Be Painfully Clear Soon Enough"	Lauren Petzke	Jimmy Mosqueda & Cynthia Adarkwa	December 5, 2019	T46.10207	0.86
A sphinx has turned up in Mystic Falls, something Hope, Lizzie, and Josie have to defeat. Josie and Vardemus use dark magic to create another Landon, in order to solve Landon's dilemma. With a Simulandon, Hope devises a plan to use the other Landon to close the Malivore portal. Alaric and Dorian find out that Vardemus is really Clarke. Clarke confronts Hope, who reveals he had to keep feeding on creatures to stay alive. Clarke tries to kill Hope and take her place, but she is saved by Simulandon who fights and defeats Clarke. Rafael reveals to Landon that the Sphinx has told him Landon will never be safe at the Salvatore School. Because of this, Landon leaves the school. Alaric and Dorian deduce that the Sphinx has a boss other than Malivore, but are unsure who. Clarke is taken to the Salvatore Crypt where the Red Hood stands over him.
24	8	"This Christmas Was Surprisingly Violent"	Brett Matthews	Brett Matthews & Hannah Rosner	December 12, 2019	T46.10208	0.93
Hope is horrified to find out that everyone is celebrating Christmas in October. Hope, not feeling festive after losing her parents, teams with Clarke, who wants his body back, to find out who is orchestrating the madness. They learn it was caused by Krampus, released from Malivore, who is killed by his captive Santa Claus, after a tough battle. Landon chooses Hope and they reunite. Sebastian plans to stay at the school. Lizzie and Sebastian discuss his dark side and then have sex. Alaric returns to his job at the Salvatore School. Rafael wants to know more about his lineage and finds his parents who raised him were not his biological family and that his real father is alive. The Red Hood is revealed to be the Necromancer – who kills Clarke and knocks him back into the Malivore portal, closing it once and for all.
25	9	"I Couldn't Have Done This Without You"	Carl Seaton	Thomas Brandon & Hannah Rosner	January 16, 2020	T46.10209	0.73
A year earlier, the Necromancer is forced into the body of a human, having his magic taken away. Living life under the name Ted, he begins searching for his powers. He finds it odd when he learns the Malivore portal has been closed. To gain his power back, he sacrifices his close friend. A month later, he revives him and they don the Red Hoods and go to Mystic Falls. Alaric is weary of Sebastian spending time at the school, but Caroline wants him to spend his time finding the real Vardemus. Hope is back at school and rooming with Alyssa. Alaric wants Sebastian to be tested for the school, and MG tries to make him look bad, but in the end makes himself look dangerous. Josie has a vision that her use of dark magic will bring the end of the Salvatore School. Sebastian fails the tests, but after appealing to Landon, Landon tells Alaric he passed. Alaric realizes the only way to protect Lizzie is to kill Sebastian and later tells Lizzie that Sebastian is gone. The Necromancer turns Clarke's body into another Malivore Pit.
26	10	"This Is Why We Don't Entrust Plans to Muppet Babies"	America Young	Adam Higgs & Josh Eiserike	January 23, 2020	T46.10210	0.72
Alyssa had difficulty adjusting to school and it is revealed that Alaric and Emma would put similar troubled students in prison worlds. On Coven Day, the Qareen is released in Mystic Falls by the Necromancer, in order to steal the Mora Miserium that Josie has been using. The Qareen pits all witches from different covens against each other, specifically causing friction between Hope and Alyssa. The Qareen also pits Hope against Landon which strains their relationship. Josie has another vision of her dark self and is warned not to let the Mora Miserium break for it will change her. Wade is the only one not being affected by the Qareen, which leads to the revelation that he is a fairy. Wade uses his power to defeat the Qareen before it steals the Mora Miserium. Lizzie suggests that they house the More Miserium in a prison world. The plan goes well but Alaric, Josie, and Lizzie all end up trapped in the prison world with Sebastian by Alyssa who linked the new ascendant with old ascendants as payback for erasing her memory and the other former students.
27	11	"What Cupid Problem?"	Darren Grant	Penny Cox & Cynthia Adarkwa	January 30, 2020	T46.10211	0.86
Cupid arrives in Mystic Falls and shoots people. At the school, Landon tries to fly with Wade's help but is unsuccessful. Cupid infects Emma and Dorian. Hope tries to find out where the ascendent is from Alyssa and questions her. In the woods, Kaleb and MG talk about Kym. Landon finds the Cupid and fights him. Hope shows up and stops the Cupid from shooting Landon. Hope and Landon talk to Cupid and ask about the arrows. Hope asks Kym and MG to help her. Landon and Cupid talk about Hope and Hope arrows Alyssa. Cupid escapes and MG tells Alyssa the truth. The gang finds out that it is not Cupid that they are dealing with, but his younger brother, Pothos. Landon asks for the super squad's help. Hope shoots Pothos with arrows. Landon kills Pothos and dies. Alyssa tries to kill Kym. Landon comes back to life and Hope and Landon kiss. They discover Landon can fly. Kym says goodbye to MG.
28	12	"Kai Parker Screwed Us"	Angela Barnes Gomes	Brett Matthews & Thomas Brandon	February 6, 2020	T46.10212	0.63
Josie, Alaric, and Lizzie find themselves trapped in the prison world with Sebastian, three of his old students – Jade, Wendy, and Diego – and Kai Parker. Lizzie and Sebastian explore the prison world while Alaric goes to a bar where he is attacked by Diego and Wendy. Josie decides to work with Kai to get everyone out. Sebastian tells Lizzie he wants them to stay in the prison world forever and offers to turn her into a vampire. Kai and Josie go to retrieve Bennett blood but discover Josie had some on her the whole time. It is revealed that Jade and the others were sent there after killing several teenagers. Jade then realized she was a ripper and turned her humanity off. Lizzie rejects Sebastian's offer and siphons magic from him. Wendy and Diego discover Kai betrayed them while Kai discovers Josie played him. Josie learns that breaking the sandclock is the only way to get out, but she would become dark. Josie smashes the clock as Kai jumps into the Malivore pit. Josie breaking the clock affects Lizzie, who is driving, causing her to crash. In the present, Kai wakes up in Mystic Falls at the Malivore pit.
29	13	"You Can't Save Them All"	Jeffrey Hunt	Brett Matthews & Thomas Brandon	February 13, 2020	T46.10213	0.63
Josie's magic brings Jade's humanity back. Kai Parker turns up at the Salvatore school, pretending to want to help. Alaric, along with Jade, save Lizzie, injured in the accident. Josie, Alaric and Jade realize someone must have used the Malivore pit as someone's missing from their memory. Josie decides to siphon the magic from the world to get them out, but someone must remain as an anchor, with Alaric volunteering. Landon is compelled by Kai to walk into the path of an arrow, and thus Hope must choose between saving Landon or the Saltzmans; Hope chooses the Saltzmans . Hope stops Alyssa performing a spell to close the prison world, which would kill everyone there. Sebastian saves Alaric from an angry Diego by killing him and takes his place as the anchor. They return with the darkness gone from Josie. Dorian breaks free from his complement and takes the arrow for Landon. Hope reveals to Josie she did not choose to save Landon, but he emerges with phoenix wings and Dorian. Jade thanks Josie for everything. Lizzie astral projects to Sebastian, who reveals the world will collapse soon. Alaric kills Kai, tied up by Hope. Jed, MG, and Kaleb find Rafael in the woods.
30	14	"There's a Place Where the Lost Things Go"	Michael Karasick	Brett Matthews & Mark Ryan Walberg	March 12, 2020	T46.10214	0.52
The Salvatore students participate in a therapy session with Emma to deal with their traumas. They go into a simulation created by the real Vardemus and need to find an escape word to become conscious. MG discovers Emma dead with Vardemus nearby. In reality, a confused Emma awakens. A bottle, laced with cyanide, was intended for Lizzie. Josie reveals she planned to use Lizzie's attempted murder as publicity. Josie confesses to MG but is covering for Lizzie. She sees her escape word, then she and MG are shot. MG lives and believes Lizzie killed Josie. Lizzie sees her word but is not released. In reality, everyone but Josie, Lizzie, and Hope have awakened. Dark Josie corners Lizzie and reveals that if Lizzie dies in the simulation, she will actually die. She attempts to shoot Lizzie but is killed by Hope. Hope sees her escape word and leaves, but Josie does not awaken. Afterwards, Emma reveals to Alaric that she and Dorian are leaving the school. In the basement, Josie awakens and is revealed to be dark, exploding half the school into flames. Rafael believes there is a link between himself and the Necromancer; Josie and Jade start to have strange dreams.
31	15	"Life Was So Much Easier When I Only Cared About Myself"	Lauren Petzke	Adam Higgs & Jimmy Mosqueda	March 19, 2020	T46.10215	0.66
Josie returns to school on her and Lizzie's 17th birthday, revealing she plans to have them merge. Vardemus and Alaric plan to trap Josie inside the simulation again, but Hope, Kaleb and MG trap him inside instead. The group plans to create a safe location inside Lizzie's mind for Josie's mind to go, meaning Lizzie has to beat Josie. Josie kills Alyssa, who is attempting to help Lizzie prepare for the Merge. Hope locks Kaleb in the simulation after he threatens to kill Josie. There, he meets Alaric, who says he needs an elixir for his daughters. He soon becomes self-aware and is able to get the two of them out. MG locates Lizzie at a gas station and convinces her to go back. Hope asks Landon for a favor. When Lizzie does not appear, Hope fights in her place. Hope attempts to bring back Josie while fighting. Lizzie turns up and they begin the Merge, with Josie winning. Lizzie's life has been linked to Landon's, and so Lizzie comes back to life when Landon does, and they send Hope inside Josie's mind to retrieve her. Rafael discovers he was killed and reanimated by the Necromancer and kills Landon with a golden arrow.
32	16	"Facing Darkness Is Kinda My Thing"	Michael Karasick	Thomas Brandon & Sylvia Batey Alcalá	March 26, 2020	T46.10216	0.67
Hope awakens in Josie's subconscious and finds a pig who reveals Josie put a sleeping spell on herself to protect the kingdom. MG and Lizzie, disguised as Hope, prepare for Lizzie's "funeral", but she soon realizes that no one is upset that she is dead. Hope and the pig run into a cabin after being chased by Josie's darkness, manifesting as a wolf-like creature. Dark Josie tells the Necromancer the Merge did not work and the funeral is an act. The wolf arrives in the cabin, eating the pig before being killed by Hope. Josie appears, revealing she was the pig. Dark Josie arrives, realizing Hope is in her subconscious. The Necromancer makes a deal with Alaric: he will take the dark magic from Josie and will resurrect the students, including Rafael and Landon. MG gives a eulogy about how no one let Lizzie change. Hope convinces Josie she can only beat the dark magic if she believes in herself. Realizing she can be powerful and good, Josie "kills" Dark Josie, and the darkness is transferred to the Necromancer. Lizzie thanks MG. Rafael and Alaric discover that, for an unknown reason, Landon and Hope will not wake up.

=== Season 3 (2021) ===
No. overall	No. in season	Title	Directed by	Written by	Original release date	Prod. code	U.S. viewers (millions)
33	1	"We're Not Worthy"	Jeffrey Hunt	Penny Cox & Cynthia Adarkwa	January 21, 2021	T46.10301	0.69
Hope still cannot wake up, while the Salvatore School hosts a field day for its students, which goes awry when Chad summons the Lady of the Lake and the Green Knight from Malivore. At field day, Lizzie tries to repair Josie's image, who is distressed that her magic is gone. The Lady of the Lake is after a sword, owned by the Knight who will not give it up and will only allow someone worthy to take it. The Necromancer brings Landon back from the dead, but with no powers, wanting to use him in a scheme of his. Rafael is revealed to be the worthy one worthy of the sword and the only one who can possess it, revealing that he is a descendant of King Arthur. Landon wakes Hope up with a kiss, while Lizzie spends more time with MG. Elsewhere, Chad begins coughing up black goo and dies. Before Alyssa can suffer the same fate, the Necromancer appears and she pleads with him, pledging her life to him.
34	2	"Goodbyes Sure Do Suck"	Eric Dean Seaton	Benjamin Raab & Deric A. Hughes	January 28, 2021	T46.10302	0.71
Landon wants to learn more about Rafael's family lineage. However, Rafael begins coughing up black sludge, just like Chad and Alyssa. With Alaric and The Necromancer's deal no longer standing, Rafael has to die just like Chad, Landon, and Alyssa. Hope and the Super Squad try to save his life, but can only prolong his death. Rafael wants to spend his last time alive with family, but cannot find anyone. Due to the day being a celestial event, Hope realizes she can access a prison world. If Rafael can enter a prison world on this day, he will not die and get to live there. Alaric finds Rafael's mother with the help of a compelled Sheriff Mac and father and they agree to go to the prison world with him. Rafael says his goodbyes to everyone and is sent to the prison world to live out the rest of his life. This leaves Hope and Landon strained, due to Landon's loss of power and Hope wanting to prevent his death too. The Necromancer and Alyssa call back the Sphinx, who predicts that his plan will come to pass and that one of the students will die.
35	3	"Salvatore: The Musical!"	Jason Stone	Thomas Brandon	February 4, 2021	T46.10303	0.62
A new monster is posing as a school councilor; a sprite, with the ability to make everyone believe that he has always been there. He convinces Landon to put on a musical about Elena, Caroline, Stefan, Damon, and the founding of the school. Hope and Landon are still fighting. Landon tries to apologize but Hope is angry that he used her letter from Klaus as lyrics in the musical, but after watching said musical she comes around and performs a song "Always & Forever" about her family. Lizzie has some anxiety playing Caroline, feeling like she is a mess compared to her mother. Caroline leaves a letter for Lizzie, easing her anxiety. The sprite was instructed to use chaos to distract the gang but he mended the broken hearts of Landon and Hope proving that monsters could also be redeemed. Early on, MG was visited by Alyssa. Feigning affection, he was given a tip about the monster-in-disguise, which was an elaborate ploy to lure him to the Necromancer's lair. MG storms in to save Alyssa, and she puts a sleeping spell on him; noting a vampire-sacrifice is needed for their plan.
36	4	"Hold On Tight"	Jeffrey Hunt	Brett Matthews	February 11, 2021	T46.10304	0.63
Both Hope and Landon plan to celebrate their one-year anniversary. Alyssa and the Necromancer plan to kill MG and revive him as a super-soldier, while Alaric and the students head to Mystic Falls High to kill all the monsters the Necromancer has revived. Josie and Lizzie team up to rescue MG, who wants Alyssa to tell them the Triad Spell and rewrite it. Landon meets Malivore, his father, who is in his true form. However, when he goes to find the Necromancer, he is killed by one of his monsters. Hope beheads the Necromancer, while Landon is revived. Alaric realizes that Landon, Hope, and the monsters are in a prison world, transported there by Alyssa, Lizzie, and Josie who sent all the spells there. Once Hope and Landon return, they make love for the first time to celebrate their anniversary. Alaric allows Sheriff Mac to retain her memories of the supernatural world and MG proposes a relationship to Alyssa, upsetting Lizzie. Josie tells Lizzie she is giving up magic and has enrolled at Mystic Falls High. While Hope and Landon are in bed together, Landon suddenly melts in front of Hope becoming a dark puddle.
37	5	"This Is What It Takes"	Jeffrey Hunt; Darren Grant	Brett Matthews	February 18, 2021	T46.10305	0.52
After Landon's disappearance, Hope returns to the Salvatore school to ask for help, but no one remembers her as she went through the Malivore portal. Initially Alaric and the Super Squad distrust her, but with Josie's help she brings back everyone's memory with a spell. Three weeks after Landon's disappearance, Alaric has sent all the students home in order to focus on saving Landon. Josie goes to orientation at Mystic Falls High, where she meets fellow student Finch, who takes her on a school tour. Hope and Alaric, after several unsuccessful attempts to recover a magical artifact, decide to try Professor Vardemus's therapy box, which catapults Hope into a summer camp in the 1980s where a masked killer wanders. The killer is a simulated Landon, who warns Hope to stop looking for him and leads her to believe she is the cause of his "disappearance" since her blood is toxic to him. Hope decides to stay with this Landon in the therapy box forever, but the game throws her out after Alaric unplugs the box. Alaric has found the desired artifact, but it fails to return Landon. Landon is shown walking towards a door highlighted by a bright light.
38	6	"To Whom It May Concern"	Lauren Petzke	Thomas Brandon	March 11, 2021	T46.10306	0.49
The Salvatore School reopens after the mandated break only for the Super Squad to find out that a majority of the student body has transferred out of the school and that it is in jeopardy of being shut down, and Lizzie asks Hope to help her with orientation for new students; both have to be distracted, one for Landon's loss, the other for not thinking about Josie's first day at Mystic Falls High School. Hope loses control, every room in the school reminds her of Landon; she meets Cleo, a student, a witch who helps her express her emotions through art and painting. The two become roommates. Thanks to Cleo and another new student, the school is safe and does not have to close for now. Landon goes through the bright door and finds himself in Ted's ice cream parlor, or the Necromancer, who absorbed by Malivore was chained there; after a fight between the two, he manages to break free and return to the prison world where he writes a letter and leaves it at the gate of the Salvatore school in the hope that someone will find it.
39	7	"Yup, It's a Leprechaun, All Right"	Tony Griffin	Penny Cox & Cynthia Adarkwa	March 18, 2021	T46.10307	0.57
Lizzie decides to help Alaric raise money for the Salvatore School, which is on the verge of going broke and being shut down in light of recent events. Her fundraiser is accelerated when a leprechaun shows up to the school and all of the fundraiser's guests start buying everything. Cleo tries to help Hope mourn Landon, but Hope realizes that Malivore is still open after detecting the leprechaun, giving her hope for Landon. The two defeat the leprechaun and Cleo tries to bond with Hope, revealing her sisters were murdered by a supernatural creature. Josie and MG bond over Josie's fear of growing close to new relationships, specifically Finch. Ethan warns Josie to be careful around Finch. MG reveals to Lizzie that he has had the ascendant and has been lying about it being destroyed, devastating Hope and Lizzie.
40	8	"Long Time, No See"	Geoffrey Wing Shotz	Benjamin Raab & Deric A. Hughes	March 25, 2021	T46.10308	0.47
Hope dreams about Landon, making her believe he may be still alive and is trying to contact her. With Lizzie's help, she is projected to a prison world where she finds Landon's letter. Hope demands the Super Squad go to the prison world to rescue Landon, but Alaric and the team are not sure it is safe, feeling they can die or release Malivore into the world. Kaleb, Lizzie, and MG decline to help Hope leading her to turn to Josie. Cleo summons a psychopomp named Charon in order to help them get Landon back. The prison world is toxic and hurting Josie, and at the last minute before she has to stop holding them in, Landon appears. Due to his opinion being ignored, MG feels like the Salvatore School is no longer his home. Josie plans to go live with a friend of Alaric and Caroline's in town and distance herself from the Salvatore School. Landon notes he can only remember darkness. The skull-masked hunter from the prison world is seen lurking outside the Salvatore School.
41	9	"Do All Malivore Monsters Provide This Level of Emotional Insight?"	Barbara Brown	Brett Matthews & Adam Higgs	April 8, 2021	T46.10309	0.51
The Super Squad discusses which monster they should summon so they can learn about Malivore's next plan while Alaric investigates the artifact. Their discussion is interrupted by the arrival of a gremlin that feeds off of disrespect between people. Lizzie and Hope are at odds after Hope's decision to save Landon but have to resolve their argument because of the gremlin. The gremlin captures Cleo and uses the energy to power up. Lizzie and Hope are forced to become closer with each other than they would like in order to stop the gremlin. MG joins Mystic Falls High School and accidentally exposes his powers to Ethan; when he tries to compel Ethan to forget the revelation, he and Alaric realize Sheriff Mac had been giving Ethan vervain. MG has to wait for the vervain to leave Ethan's system, and he and Ethan bond over feeling lost. Lizzie is unsure where the monsters are coming from but hopes they will just stop. She and Hope are watched by the skull-masked hunter. Dorian tells Alaric the artifact has belonged to Albert Einstein, Napoleon Bonaparte, and Rasputin among other historical figures, which is cause for concern.
42	10	"All's Well That Ends Well"	Jeffrey Hunt	Thomas Brandon & Price Peterson	April 15, 2021	T46.10310	0.51
Hope suspects that Malivore is targeting Cleo, leading Hope to use Cleo as bait to catch Malivore or another of its monsters. The plan works as a banshee arrives. The Super Squad learns that Malivore has tasked the banshee with bringing him Cleo. The banshee also reveals that if Cleo continues to stay at the school, Landon will die. Cleo volunteers to leave the school to protect Landon, but it is revealed this was Malivore's plan all along. On her way to save Cleo, Hope encounters the skull-masked hunter and she notes that it feels like she has encountered him before. She manages to save Cleo before Malivore can capture her. Alaric learns that Malivore wants Cleo because she is a muse and he needs her gift of inspiration to solve a problem he has most likely to escape the prison world. Lizzie confronts Josie about her budding relationship with Finch. Josie ends up being rejected by Finch despite Lizzie's attempts to help her. MG and Ethan grow closer. Lizzie learns Finch is a werewolf. While Landon and Hope are sleeping, the skull-masked hunter sneaks into Landon's room and cuts off pieces of their hair, then leaves.
43	11	"You Can't Run from Who You Are"	Trevor E.S. Juarez	Adam Higgs & Hannah Rosner	May 6, 2021	T46.10311	0.50
An old tape shows Clarke trying to destroy the artifact but failing. Cleo inspires Hope and Alaric: Hope to astral project into the prison world to make a deal with the Necromancer which would destroy Malivore, and Alaric to make an excursion to Triad's old headquarters to find out what they knew about the artifact. In the prison world, a monster capable of entering the astral plane bites Hope. Wade reveals to Landon and Josie that the monster is a Berbalang from Filipino legend (adapted by Dungeons and Dragons) which replicates through physical contact. After a conversation with her subconscious (which manifests as Dark Josie), Josie takes back her magic and enchants a pearl-bladed dagger, which she and Landon use to bring Hope back. Alaric finds out the artifact was created by Leonardo da Vinci. Lizzie and MG discover that Finch unwittingly killed her grandfather when she became a werewolf. Kaleb opens up to Cleo and Cleo agrees to go out with him. Hope and Josie reconnect. Perturbed by Landon's odd behavior, Wade warns Hope that something might be wrong with Landon.
44	12	"I Was Made to Love You"	Michael A. Allowitz	Brett Matthews	May 13, 2021	T46.10312	0.50
Hope becomes suspicious when Landon appears to be supernaturally strong and shows no allergic reaction to avocados. Knocking him out with a sleep spell, Hope recruits Cleo in an attempt to find out who or what Landon really is. A needle drawing out Malivore mud instead of blood from him, her blood being toxic to him and writing on his shoulder that matches her and Cleo's bust of him leads Hope to deduce he is a golem created from the bust. Cleo reveals that she was controlling the faux-Landon and that Hope freed her when she opened the artifact. The skull-masked individual knocks Cleo out when she tries to kill Hope, and reveals himself to be the real Landon. Josie and Alaric track down the now-human Necromancer, who agrees to help them but is ultimately forced to sacrifice himself to free Alaric from a boundary spell Cleo uses to trap them in Alaric's office. A note from Lizzie tells Josie the truth about Finch, but an initially conflicted Josie finally confesses how she feels about Finch and they kiss. MG revealing the truth about the supernatural world causes Ethan to try to become a vampire, but MG stops him and erases his memory for good measure.
45	13	"One Day You Will Understand"	Bola Ogun	Cynthia Adarkwa	May 20, 2021	T46.10313	0.53
Cleo invites Kaleb and then Josie to enter her mind to see if she is malevolent. They learn how she sacrificed herself to Malivore and was trapped in a cave alone with him for years before she managed to trap him in a vessel she controlled and escaped. Alaric releases Cleo after learning that she was trying to get Hope to kill Malivore and that for Malivore to be defeated, Hope would have to die. Hope struggles to reconnect with the recently returned Landon, whose erratic behavior leads to him beating up a former bully at Mystic Falls High. Landon reveals he learned to fight to protect himself in the prison world and he and Hope take down Malivore's vessel together, with the artifact destroyed in the fight. Hope confesses that she does not want to become a full Tribrid, but Landon is convinced that it is inevitable and they are doomed to destroy each other. He breaks up with her and leaves for the bus station, where he meets and bonds with Cleo. Finch fits in well with Jed and the pack and decides to stay at the Salvatore School and date Josie.
46	14	"This Feels a Little Cult-y"	America Young	Penny Cox	June 10, 2021	T46.10314	0.42
Hope struggles to control her negative emotions. Josie convinces Hope to accompany her to Lizzie's wellness retreat. Alaric and Dorian search for MG, who has been missing for a few days. Finch challenges Jed to become Alpha since she is fed up with the oppressive rules of the pack – she proposes a game of pool. Ultimately, seeing how much Jed cares about his pack, Finch decides to let him win. Josie and Hope suspect the retreat is a cult. Lizzie confirms this, discovering her "inner peace" is the result of a liquid drug, developed by Triad, that removes the negative emotions of witches so they can be controlled. Andi, who is a witch pretending to be an empath, and who is running the "retreat", was freed from Triad on the condition she perform a ritual that needs the magic of several witches and a human sacrifice. The three witches defeat Andi, but she drenches them with the drug and decides to complete the spell by sacrificing herself, leaving Lizzie, Josie and Hope hallucinating that they are pandas.
47	15	"A New Hope"	Brett Matthews	Brett Matthews & Thomas Brandon	June 17, 2021	T46.10315	0.49
Hope, Lizzie, and Josie are trapped in a sci-fi story which they must complete. It is based on a story Lizzie wrote when she was eleven years old. A message from Alaric tells the twins not to follow him as he pursues the Star Sword, which is the only weapon that can kill the villain, Lord Marshall. They seek him out anyway. Josie realizes she already has the sword, which only the chosen one can wield it. They are captured by Lord Marshall. Lizzie reveals she viewed Hope as competition for her father's attention, so she "cast" Hope as Lord Marshall. In the real world, Alaric and Emma work to save Dorian from the wounds inflicted by the wendigo. The girls are rescued by a young Hope, who heard Josie relating Lizzie's story. Hope reveals she rewrote the story with the Hollow as the villain, and realizes she knows how the story ends. Hope defeats the villain, who is revealed to be Malivore. Hope tells the twins that she knows how to defeat the real Malivore – she must become the tribrid. As they escape the hallucination, they encounter Clarke, who has been freed by the ritual.
48	16	"Fate's a Bitch, Isn't It?"	Jeffrey Hunt	Benjamin Raab & Deric A. Hughes	June 24, 2021	T46.10316	0.57
Cleo and Landon rob a museum and steal an artifact from Leonardo da Vinci, which she melts down and combines with a vial of Hope's blood in an attempt to kill Malivore. When their exploits attract attention, Alaric sends MG and Kaleb to cover their tracks. Hope teams with a now-human Clarke, feeling she has no other choice to defeat Malivore. Hope leaves Josie and Lizzie at a gas station; they are brought back to school by Ethan, who Lizzie attempts to set up with Hope. Hope uses a locator spell to find Landon and Cleo. She discusses their plans to defeat Malivore with Cleo while Landon and Clarke are left to discuss their father. When Hope returns, she finds Clarke bleeding out from a wound to his neck but is able to save his life. After covering up Cleo and Landon's heist at the museum, MG and Kaleb save a man from a fire, realizing they can use their powers like superheroes and do good. Outside the hotel, Landon tells Cleo he had hoped it would not come to this. As Alaric pulls up, he sees Cleo being eaten by Landon. Alaric shoots Landon, subduing him. Hope and Alaric realize that this is not Landon and that it never has been: Landon has been Malivore all along. Hope visits Clarke in the hospital and tells him Malivore has been hiding in plain sight, while promising to take down Malivore once and for all. Ethan asks Lizzie out. Hope, Alaric, and the Super Squad confront Malivore and tell him they want their friends back, while he replies that there is something he wants too.

=== Season 4 (2021–22) ===
No. overall	No. in season	Title	Directed by	Written by	Original release date	Prod. code	U.S. viewers (millions)
49	1	"You Have to Pick One This Time"	Tony Solomons	Mark Ryan Walberg	October 14, 2021	T46.10317	0.33
The Super Squad trick Malivore. Alaric and Kaleb enter his conscious mind. Hope and MG sneak in undetected. Malivore tortures Kaleb with visions of his past, and leaves him to battle his bloodlust, while Hope interferes with Cleo's vision of peace within Malivore, alerting him to her presence. The real Landon saves Alaric and allows Kaleb to feed on him. Malivore takes Cleo, who secretly inspires Hope. Malivore tortures MG with his memory of killing Landon, and tells Hope she can find Landon if she abandons MG. Hope hesitates, but snaps out of it and saves MG. Landon convinces Alaric and Kaleb to kill his physical body. Hope, MG, Alaric and Kaleb exit. Alaric and Kaleb lie to Hope about Landon. Lizzie has a hard conversation with Josie and Finch. Hope and MG regain their connection. Lizzie tells Hope she wants the kind of relationship she and Landon, and Josie and Finch, have, and asks her to stay until she falls asleep. Hope drifts off to sleep but wakes as Cleo's Muse powers take effect.
50	2	"There's No I in Team, or Whatever"	Michael Karasick	Adam Higgs & Hannah Rosner	October 21, 2021	T46.10318	0.34
Hope sees Cleo's memory of her grandmother performing a powerful transfusion spell, and she recruits the Super Squad, sans Lizzie, to use the spell to transfer Landon into Clarke's body, thus freeing him from Malivore, while Lizzie goes on her date with Ethan, volunteering at a school fundraiser. Clarke initially refuses to help, but finally agrees, wanting revenge on Malivore. Hope fails to complete the spell 11 times in a simulation. Josie warns her that she cannot focus if she is worrying about Landon, and takes her place when they finally perform the spell. Malivore subverts the spell and transfers a Dybbuk into Clarke, who attacks the fundraiser, knocks Ethan out and kidnaps Lizzie. MG takes Ethan back to the school. Clarke sneaks up on Kaleb, but Hope arrives, rescues Lizzie and transfers the Dybbuk out of Clarke. At the school, Malivore manipulates Alaric into letting him go, and converts Ethan into a drone. Hope learns of Alaric and Kaleb's lie regarding Landon.
51	3	"We All Knew This Day Was Coming"	Lauren Petzke	Teleplay by : Courtney Grace & J.P. Estes; Story by : Thomas Brandon	October 28, 2021	T46.10319	0.36
Ethan helps Malivore convert a Mystic Falls High student, Blake, into a drone. Hope clashes with Alaric and Kaleb over their deception regarding Landon, confronts a Malivore monster on her own and kills it, only to find out she killed Blake. Devastated, Hope makes the decision to turn. Seeking reassurance that Landon will understand, Hope visits Raf in the prison world. Dorian arrives to convince Alaric that Hope needs her family by her side when she turns. MG incapacitates Kaleb to prevent him from sabotaging Hope's plan. Kaleb becomes a Malivore drone under duress. Reassured by Raf, Hope has a last supper with her friends and family. Lizzie and Josie reassure Hope that her future is bright. Malivore tricks Cleo into revealing her secret. Freya arrives to be by Hope's side and stops Hope's heart in order to trigger her transformation and Hope finds herself at the edge of a lake with Charon near a boat and Peace visible in the distance. Kaleb arrives at the school and takes Hope's body with him.
52	4	"See You on the Other Side"	Jeffrey Hunt	Brett Matthews & Sylvia Batey Alcalá	November 4, 2021	T46.10320	0.42
In Limbo, Hope is asked to surrender her necklace to cross over into Peace. She finds Ted the Necromancer, who cannot remember if Klaus will find Peace if she does. Hearing this, she forgoes Peace, waking up in transition. Ethan and Kaleb have been turning townspeople into Malivore drones. Ethan now has supernatural powers and almost kills MG until Lizzie saves him. Hope completes her transition, and she and Landon share a final goodbye. Cleo outwits Malivore and exits his mind with help from Josie. Hope kills Landon with a weapon made out of her blood, ending Malivore. Landon finds himself in Limbo with Ted, who reminds him that they have both found their way out of worse situations. Both Ethan and Kaleb retain their Malivore-granted powers, with Kaleb remaining part dragon and Ethan possessing invisibility, strength and teleportation. Overwhelmed by having had to kill Landon, Hope turns off her emotions and calls Alaric to meet her. She tells him she does not want anyone looking for her and approaches him menacingly.
53	5	"I Thought You'd Be Happier to See Me"	Lauren Petzke	Brett Matthews	November 11, 2021	T46.10401	0.43
Hope renders Alaric comatose and turns off her humanity. Rebekah finds her and tries to help. MG takes Lizzie and Josie through Alaric's memories where he feels he failed Hope and the twins. Alaric's condition worsens, and Lizzie finds him at his memory of her birth. Alaric's body begins to shut down and he says goodbye, apologizing to Lizzie for all his wrongdoings. MG and Ethan work on Ethan's new powers. Rebekah daggers Hope and plans to take her to New Orleans, but the bartender snaps her neck. Hope awakens and hears him talking to a mysterious woman. She tortures him and he reveals that he is working for the Triad, one wolf, one witch, and one vampire who are monitoring Hope now that she is the tribrid. He says she should speak to "Aur-" but bursts into flames and dies. Hope gives Freya's charmed necklace back to Rebekah, warning her to stay away. Rebekah tells Hope that Klaus would be ashamed. As Hope drives off, she calls the woman again who says she cannot wait to meet her.
54	6	"You're a Long Way from Home"	America Young	Thomas Brandon & Kimberly Ndombe	November 18, 2021	T46.10402	0.38
Cleo and the Super Squad work toward helping Hope but they find that every one of their simulation attempts failed. Lizzie finds a spell in Alaric's journals meant to resurrect someone using a human sacrifice and tries to talk Josie into helping her with the spell but fails to do so. She almost completes the spell but cannot go through with it. The Super Squad works on their teamwork out in the field but Kaleb decides to take matters into his own hands and loses control of his powers when Jed provokes him. Hope finds Clarke and tries to find the originators of the Triad bloodlines – a witch, werewolf, and vampire – and attempts to turn Clarke over to the dark side. Hope sets a monster free and the Salvatore School receives a call from Clarke warning them about Hope. Cleo finds that her stake can kill Hope. Clarke reveals his secret life to his new girlfriend, Trudy, and surprisingly, she seems interested to know more. Landon and Ted prepare to head to Peace and are greeted by Alaric's arrival.
55	7	"Someplace Far Away from All This Violence"	Barbara Brown	Jose Molina & Hannah Rosner	December 2, 2021	T46.10403	0.36
In the therapy box, Lizzie is in the Wild West, where her father has been imprisoned and accused of burning down his school and killing his students and Josie has been kidnapped and turned into a vampire by Hope Mikaelson. In the real world the super squad is looking for a way to bring back Hope's humanity. Cleo's inspiration and Josie's revelation that they must get to Hope emotionally helps the Squad make a plan. Meanwhile, Hope sneaks into the school to get some weapons, but Cleo, Josie, and MG stop her and offer her a deal: they will give her the weapons as long as she gives them a chance to bring her back. She accepts. The plan fails as not even the letter Landon wrote for Hope before he died manages to get to her. Josie realizes that Hope is just afraid to get her humanity back, but Hope imprisons her in the therapy box. Josie meets Lizzie, who tells her that she has found the loophole that will kill Hope. Hope talks on the phone to the mysterious Triad member who reveals she is waiting for Hope.
56	8	"You Will Remember Me"	Nimisha Mukerji	Brett Matthews & Layne Morgan	December 9, 2021	T46.10404	0.36
In the therapy box, Josie and Hope are surgical interns. Josie struggles unlike Hope. One day, Hope screws up in the OR, and their superior decides to fire her. Josie retrieves a report signed by Alaric that could clear Hope, but gets fired instead for accessing the report behind her superior's back. Josie confronts Hope when she discovers Hope lied. Hope reveals that Alaric cleared Klaus just like Josie cleared Hope. Josie realizes that the pressure is making Hope lose sight of who she is, validating Josie's worst fears. Josie decides to figure out a way forward on her own. In Limbo, Alaric makes amends to Landon, gets a coin and plots to steal the boat from Charon. Meanwhile, Hope kills both Triad members except Aurora, who Freaky Fridays them. At the school, Cleo keeps the red oak tree a secret from Lizzie and even burns it down, but Lizzie finds out anyway and fashions a stake from its ashes, sharpening it in preparation for confronting Hope.
57	9	"I Can't Be the One to Stop You"	Morenike Joela Evans	Benjamin Raab & Deric A. Hughes	December 16, 2021	T46.10405	0.37
Jed claims Kaleb is responsible for burning a man to death. Kaleb later reveals that the man caused him to act that way and he could not control it. Lizzie finds Hope and quickly learns she is Aurora. Aurora tasks her with tricking Hope so she can get her revenge. Lizzie knocks Aurora out and plans to stake Hope but cannot go through with it. Hope pretends to have her emotions turned back on by Lizzie. Lizzie helps her get her body back. Alaric, Ted, and Landon ask the Sphinx to help them find another way home. The mystery man affects Ethan, causing him to injure Jed and almost kill the man. Ethan confesses he lied to MG. Josie leaves town, feeling it is her only way to save Hope, while Finch decides to stay with the pack. The man wakes up – he is charming and attractive while approaching Jed. After Lizzie switches Hope and Aurora's body, Aurora escapes and Lizzie plans to go after her soon. Hope reveals her deceit and kills Lizzie, who then awakens in transition to a Heretic.
58	10	"The Story of My Life"	Jeffrey Hunt	Brett Matthews & Price Peterson	February 24, 2022	T46.10406	0.29
Hope visits Vardemus, hoping he will destroy the artifact she has placed Lizzie in. Vardemus realizes the artifact has ties to the Gods. He then tricks Hope, placing her in a chambre de chasse. He awakens Lizzie and she feeds off him. Lizzie tries to kill Hope but realizes she cannot because she is sired to her. The trio finds that one of Vardemus' students, Jen, is stealing the artifact. Hope confronts Jen, but she flies away, and they realize Jen is a God. Ben tells Jed his story: he is a God who was estranged from his father. When his boyfriend became ill, he begged his father to save him, but he refused. He stole the magic from the Gods to save him, but it was too late. Magic was released into the world, and he was cursed. Cleo creates a band that will protect Ben. Hope orders Lizzie to come with her. Jed tells Ben he realizes Ben is Prometheus and that he wants him to stay at school, with him. Alaric, Ted, and Landon head to the clocktower where they find a genie and ask him for three wishes.
59	11	"Follow the Sound of My Voice"	Tony Griffin	Thomas Brandon & Solange Morales	March 3, 2022	T46.10407	0.36
Hope's attempts to train Lizzie at a carnival are futile as Lizzie attempts to save a girl's missing sister. Hope ends their partnership. Lizzie is captured by the vampires who run the carnival. Aurora kills the new headmistress and puts a truth weed in the school's water supply, trying to find a way to kill Hope. Jed feels weird around Ben and pushes him away. Aurora steals Cleo's inspiration, which leads her to Ben. She threatens Ben who gives her the secret to kill Hope. Aurora leaves the school. MG and Kaleb find Ethan hiding at his mom's house, afraid to reveal his powers to his family. MG tells him he can come back to school, and he tells his family the truth about his powers. Hope saves Lizzie and they kill the vampires running the carnival. Jed reveals his struggle with his new and unexpected romantic feelings for Ben to Finch. Hope and Lizzie reconcile and plan to find a way that works for them. The loss of her ability to inspire leaves Cleo deeply hurt. Ben reveals that he told Aurora about the Gods.
60	12	"Not All Those Who Wander Are Lost"	Michael A. Allowitz	Brett Matthews & Mark Ryan Walberg	March 10, 2022	T46.10408	0.26
Hope and Lizzie find and capture Aurora. Lizzie clashes with Hope, whose use of increasingly violent methods to extort information from Aurora alienates her. Disgusted, Lizzie instead attempts to treat Aurora with compassion. Aurora tells Lizzie everything, although under the impression that Lizzie is her brother Tristan. Lizzie breaks free of the sire bond and escapes with Aurora. They bond over their shared experience of being treated as unstable and dangerous because of bipolar disorder and Lizzie asks Aurora for help in locating the God Vulcan, aka. Jen. Jen can manipulate time, and Lizzie notes she can possibly bring them back to when Tristan was alive and her life wasn't in a shambles. The Jinni grants Landon and Alaric's wishes – Alaric's wish brings him out of his coma. Landon is forced to stay in Limbo with Ted, who is the Necromancer again. Hope starts to feel her humanity slowly coming back due to Lizzie's efforts to get through to her, and lashes out, killing a man who nearly hit her with his car.
61	13	"Was This the Monster You Saw?"	Trevor E.S. Juarez	Brett Matthews & Kimberly Ndombe	March 31, 2022	T46.10409	0.41
Aurora and Lizzie road trip to find more information about the Gods and track down Jen. Hope returns to the Salvatore School, just as Alaric returns from the hospital, with the goal of finding an army to take down the Gods with. The Super Squad is not ready to accept her proposal, but she is set on getting them to. She destroys Ben's bracelet and a monster attacks the school that they must defeat. The monster can bite people and make them relive their darkest moment. Flashbacks reveal Jed went through a very conservative and strict upbringing which caused him to repress who he really was. His father wanted him to fight his childhood friend and crush Trey to the death, but he ended up killing his father and triggering the curse. Hope's bite takes her back to when she turned off her humanity, and she confronts her conscience. Finally ready to be himself, Jed confesses to Ben that he knows what he wants now and that he likes him and they kiss. Alaric and the students grudgingly agree to work with Hope, just as her conscience appears to her in the real world.
62	14	"The Only Way Out Is Through"	Jeffrey Hunt	Thomas Brandon & Jose Molina	April 7, 2022	T46.10410	0.39
Jen reveals that her family, the Gods, treated her terribly, and her father, their king, Ken, cast her out. But the Gods' power came from belief, and they faced a mortal threat in Malivore, who could make the world forget them. Jen locked them in sarcophagi and planned to leave the key with Ben because she trusted him, but she was forced to abandon him when she realized the Gods would not be neutralized unless the key was in Malivore with Ben. She says that Chronos, the God of Time, was a better God. Lizzie and Aurora decide to wake Chronos up, and they abduct Ben. Vardemus helps the Squad wargame a battle against the Gods, but Hope's conscience forces her to realize that they will lose unless she turns her humanity back on. A final simulation with Hope's humanity on is a success, but the struggle between Hope and her conscience comes to a head and she screams at her friends to stop her when she realizes she is about to kill them. Alaric snaps her neck and locks her in the werewolf transition cell before making a call. In Limbo, Landon and the Necromancer are taken captive by bandits.
63	15	"Everything That Can Be Lost May Also Be Found"	Brett Matthews	Brett Matthews	April 14, 2022	T46.10411	0.43
Through astral projection, Hope is brought back to New Orleans where her family, Rebekah, Marcel, Kol, and Freya are holding a funeral for Klaus. The family does their best to get Hope to turn her emotions back on, reminiscing about their families' and Klaus' history. Rebekah and Marcel are now married, while Kol and Davina are going strong. Freya and Rebekah hope to give Hope something to look forward to by revealing she can still conceive. Hope initially fights her humanity, but turns it back on. The family has had Klaus' ashes and decides it is Hope's choice to decide where they will be scattered. She decides to take his ashes, along with her necklace, back to Mystic Falls, which was once his home and where the school was started. Elsewhere, Lizzie and Aurora form an unlikely partnership with Ben when he learns about what is going on in their attempt to find Chronos. Alaric talks with his younger, The Vampire Diaries/vampire hunter self, and learns how to prepare to lead a fight against the Gods. Cleo has a vision of the school in rubble, Mystic Falls on fire, and all their friend dead. Jen reveals Ben has deceived them, he wants to awake Ken, to break his curse and bring his boyfriend back. He then knocks out Aurora and kidnaps her, devastating Lizzie and sending her home for Alaric's help. Ben awakens Ken, and Hope awakens but her no humanity self is around and promises her the war is just beginning.
64	16	"I Wouldn't Be Standing Here If It Weren't For You"	Jason Stone	Layne Morgan & Courtney Grace	April 28, 2022	T46.10412	0.29
Cleo is horrified to learn that her visions are not predictions, rather, she is an Oracle, they can see events that will happen and she cannot change them. However, Jen later tells her she is more than an Oracle if she can change the future. Landon and the Necromancer were kidnapped by Seylah, who wants to get to know Landon and they work together to help her find peace. MG and Kaleb evacuate all of Mystic Falls and close off the roads to prevent anyone from entering. Kaleb finds Ben preparing to burn the town down in an attempt to buy Hope time from Ken. Ben finds Ethan and MG and attacks them along with Kaleb, and Jed intervenes. Lizzie helps Hope to get rid of her no humanity counterpart just as Ken arrives at the school, wanting Jen. Ben tells Jed he only awoke Ken so he could break his curse. Hope tries to fight Ken, but her magic does not work nor can she handle his power and as Ken is about to kill her, Jen surrenders herself to him. Ben tells Jed he loves him, but Jed is mad that he fought against them. MG finds Ethan on the shower floor, bleeding and glitching while in pain. Hope will not wake up and awakens in limbo where she runs into Landon and they hug.
65	17	"Into the Woods"	Jen Derwingson-Peacock	Hannah Rosner & Price Peterson	May 5, 2022	T46.10413	0.38
Lizzie and MG work together to figure out what is causing Ethan to glitch. Hope tries to get Landon out of limbo, but learns there is nothing she can do, she is not fated to die, and that she must live without him. Hope promises Landon she will always love him and never forget him. Ken courts Aurora asking her to rule alongside him and help him kill Hope. Aurora wants him to revive Tristan, but he refuses, and promises to treat her right and convinces her to help him as he shows her Jen deceived everyone and that Tristan treated her wrongly. They seal the deal with a kiss. Alaric and Ben devise a plan to fight Ken, by siphoning Ben's magic and using it to attack Ken, which could kill Ben, but Ben is fine with it if it kills Ken. Landon learns the Ferryman has the deed to his soul. MG confesses to Lizzie that he loves her, just as she learns Ethan's powers make him not fated to live long and that he will die soon. Hope wakes up and tells Alaric there are battles that cannot be won alone. He tells her he is glad she is back and that it is her move now.
66	18	"By the End of This, You'll Know Who You Were Meant to Be"	Lauren Petzke	Thomas Brandon	June 2, 2022	T46.10414	0.41
Hope and her friends come up with a plan to defeat Ken once and for all, but it will require Lizzie to potentially sacrifice herself to pull it off which she accepts; after having a hard time dealing with her emotions, she admits her love to MG. Ethan's powers are causing him to have health issues, if he uses then again, he could die. So he says goodbye to MG and leaves school. Jed is cold towards Ben until he learns that Ben was willing to sacrifice his life to save the school and the two reconcile. Cleo dives into Ken's mind, learning that he is planning to attack the school. Ken captures her and reveals that Cleo's efforts to change the future have turned her into a Fury. Revealing that he plans to have Jen forge a weapon from the ashes of a Red Oak stake to kill Hope, Ken tries to convince Cleo to give him Hope and then threatens Kaleb's life when she refuses, ultimately killing Kaleb in front of her. Jen reluctantly agrees to forge the weapon, but not before revealing to Aurora that Ken is just using her. In Limbo, the Ferryman is revealed to actually be a goddess named Lynn who is Ken's sister; Lynn's compassion for the souls in her care had led to her becoming cursed to ferry them for eternity. Landon accepts Lynn's offer to take her job before using his new powers to turn the Necromancer back into Ted and bring him to Peace. Alaric and the school hold a final celebration to mark their accomplishments where Hope thanks everyone for their support, helping her be a better person, and says it has been the honor of her lifetime to fight alongside them. Alaric and Lizzie have a father daughter dance. Lizzie and MG are about to kiss as Cleo returns to reveal Kaleb is dead.
67	19	"This Can Only End in Blood"	Jeffrey Hunt	Benjamin Raab & Deric A. Hughes	June 9, 2022	T46.10415	0.45
Jen crafts Ken a spear capable of killing Hope out of Red Oak ash and god magic; using astral projection, Hope challenges Ken to combat which he accepts. As the school prepares for battle, Ken triggers the curses of the werewolf students, creating chaos and turning them against everyone; Alaric is forced to kill Jed in self-defense while MG is killed sealing the werewolves away in the tunnels. Cleo attempts to kill Ken's sleeping family but is stopped by Jen who reveals that the Furies were one thing that Ken feared. In Limbo, Kaleb, Jed and MG seek out Landon's help and Landon agrees to resurrect them even though it means that he will be cursed to lose his empathy. Hope and Aurora battle but Hope attempts to make peace with Aurora rather than kill her; Aurora ultimately sacrifices herself to save Hope from the spear and makes peace with her and her family. Lizzie siphons Ken's power and blows him up, but she only succeeds in weakening him while Ethan sacrifices himself to save Lizzie. Following a failed attack by Hope, Lizzie, Jed, MG and Kaleb, Cleo uses her Fury powers to pass judgement upon Ken before teaming up with Hope to impale Ken upon his spear which, being made out of god magic, kills him. Ben is now mortal. As everyone celebrates their victory, Hope and Lizzie give Aurora a Viking funeral and Ethan arrives in Limbo.
68	20	"Just Don't Be A Stranger, Okay?"	Michael A. Allowitz	Julie Plec & Brett Matthews	June 16, 2022	T46.10416	0.41
Alaric decides to shut down the Salvatore School, despite the protests of Hope and MG. Hope summons Landon and asks him to bring her Klaus' spirit; Landon reveals that he no longer feels emotions as a result of resurrecting their friends. Landon and Ethan discover that Klaus has already found Peace, but arrange for him to send Hope a final message where Klaus gives Hope guidance for the rest of her life and says he loves her, always and forever. After receiving a gift from Josie, Alaric decides to keep the school open, but leaves to write the definitive history of the supernatural beings that he has known so that the world can know their stories, leaving Caroline in charge instead. Ethan finds Peace while Jed, having discovered that his resurrection has reset his curse and left him human again, leaves with Ben to find a new life. While using her powers to see Kaleb's hidden past, Cleo has a vision that reveals that Kaleb will do a lot of good in the future for people like them and it is implied that Cleo will one day become headmaster. Lizzie initially decides to join Josie in Belgium, but changes her mind and stays, continuing her relationship with MG. Hope says goodbye to Alaric and thanks him for being her second father, prompting Alaric to thank her in turn for being his third daughter. Hope and Landon spread Klaus' ashes and Landon reassures her that he is content with his new role as the Ferryman; Hope decides to send Josie Ken's spear in case it is ever needed again. After Hope puts her necklace back on, she, Caroline, and the students welcome a new class of students to the school as Hope greets them by saying “welcome home”.

== Ratings ==
=== Season 1 ===
Viewership and ratings per episode of List of Legacies episodes
No.	Title	Air date	Rating/share (18–49)	Viewers (millions)	DVR (18–49)	DVR viewers (millions)	Total (18–49)	Total viewers (millions)
1	"This Is the Part Where You Run"	October 25, 2018	0.3/1	1.12	0.3	0.66	0.6	1.79
2	"Some People Just Want to Watch the World Burn"	November 1, 2018	0.4/2	1.13	0.2	0.66	0.6	1.78
3	"We're Being Punked, Pedro"	November 8, 2018	0.3/1	1.09	0.3	0.70	0.6	1.79
4	"Hope Is Not the Goal"	November 15, 2018	0.3/1	1.08	0.3	0.68	0.6	1.74
5	"Malivore"	November 29, 2018	0.3/1	1.01	0.3	0.73	0.6	1.74
6	"Mombie Dearest"	December 6, 2018	0.4/2	1.18	—N/a	0.65	—N/a	1.83
7	"Death Keeps Knocking on My Door"	December 13, 2018	0.3/1	1.05	0.3	0.71	0.6	1.76
8	"Maybe I Should Start from the End"	January 24, 2019	0.3/1	1.01	0.3	0.74	0.6	1.75
9	"What Was Hope Doing in Your Dreams?"	January 31, 2019	0.3/1	1.01	0.3	0.70	0.6	1.71
10	"There's a World Where Your Dreams Came True"	February 7, 2019	0.4/2	1.15	0.2	0.65	0.6	1.80
11	"We're Gonna Need a Spotlight"	February 21, 2019	0.2/1	0.71	0.3	0.70	0.5	1.41
12	"There's a Mummy on Main Street"	February 28, 2019	0.3/2	0.87	0.2	0.63	0.5	1.50
13	"The Boy Who Still Has a Lot of Good to Do"	March 7, 2019	0.2/1	0.81	0.3	0.72	0.5	1.53
14	"Let's Just Finish the Dance"	March 14, 2019	0.3/1	0.96	0.2	0.62	0.5	1.58
15	"I'll Tell You a Story"	March 21, 2019	0.3/1	1.00	0.2	0.68	0.5	1.68
16	"There's Always a Loophole"	March 28, 2019	0.3/2	0.93	0.2	0.64	0.5	1.57

=== Season 2 ===
Viewership and ratings per episode of List of Legacies episodes
No.	Title	Air date	Rating/share (18–49)	Viewers (millions)	DVR (18–49)	DVR viewers (millions)	Total (18–49)	Total viewers (millions)
1	"I'll Never Give Up Hope"	October 10, 2019	0.3/1	0.80	0.2	0.66	0.5	1.46
2	"This Year Will Be Different"	October 17, 2019	0.3/1	0.82	0.2	0.70	0.5	1.53
3	"You Remind Me of Someone I Used to Know"	October 24, 2019	0.2/1	0.84	0.3	0.62	0.5	1.47
4	"Since When Do You Speak Japanese?"	November 7, 2019	0.2/1	0.79	0.4	0.74	0.6	1.53
5	"Screw Endgame"	November 14, 2019	0.3/1	0.87	0.2	0.64	0.5	1.51
6	"That's Nothing I Had to Remember"	November 21, 2019	0.3/1	0.86	0.2	0.64	0.5	1.50
7	"It Will All Be Painfully Clear Soon Enough"	December 5, 2019	0.3/2	0.86	0.2	0.66	0.5	1.52
8	"This Christmas Was Surprisingly Violent"	December 12, 2019	0.3/2	0.93	0.3	0.71	0.6	1.64
9	"I Couldn't Have Done This Without You"	January 16, 2020	0.2/1	0.73	0.3	0.69	0.5	1.42
10	"This Is Why We Don't Entrust Plans to Muppet Babies"	January 23, 2020	0.2/1	0.72	0.3	0.63	0.5	1.35
11	"What Cupid Problem?"	January 30, 2020	0.3/2	0.86	0.2	0.59	0.5	1.45
12	"Kai Parker Screwed Us"	February 6, 2020	0.2	0.63	0.2	0.60	0.4	1.23
13	"You Can't Save Them All"	February 13, 2020	0.2	0.63	0.3	0.60	0.5	1.23
14	"There's a Place Where the Lost Things Go"	March 12, 2020	0.2	0.52	0.3	0.66	0.5	1.18
15	"Life Was So Much Easier When I Only Cared About Myself"	March 19, 2020	0.2	0.66	0.3	0.63	0.5	1.29
16	"Facing Darkness Is Kinda My Thing"	March 26, 2020	0.2	0.67	0.3	0.57	0.5	1.24

=== Season 3 ===
Viewership and ratings per episode of List of Legacies episodes
No.	Title	Air date	Rating/share (18–49)	Viewers (millions)	DVR (18–49)	DVR viewers (millions)	Total (18–49)	Total viewers (millions)
1	"We're Not Worthy"	January 21, 2021	0.2	0.69	0.1	0.45	0.3	1.14 (Note: Live +7 ratings were not available, so Live +3 ratings have been used instead.)
2	"Goodbyes Sure Do Suck"	January 28, 2021	0.2	0.71	—N/a	—N/a	—N/a	—N/a
3	"Salvatore: The Musical!"	February 4, 2021	0.2	0.62	—N/a	—N/a	—N/a	—N/a
4	"Hold On Tight"	February 11, 2021	0.2	0.63	—N/a	—N/a	—N/a	—N/a
5	"This Is What It Takes"	February 18, 2021	0.1	0.52	0.2	—N/a	0.3	TBD
6	"To Whom It May Concern"	March 11, 2021	0.1	0.49	—N/a	—N/a	—N/a	—N/a
7	"Yup, It's a Leprechaun, All Right"	March 18, 2021	0.1	0.57	—N/a	—N/a	—N/a	—N/a
8	"Long Time, No See"	March 25, 2021	0.1	0.47	—N/a	—N/a	—N/a	—N/a
9	"Do All Malivore Monsters Provide This Level of Emotional Insight?"	April 8, 2021	0.1	0.51	0.2	0.42	0.3	0.93
10	"All's Well That Ends Well"	April 15, 2021	0.1	0.51	—N/a	—N/a	—N/a	—N/a
11	"You Can't Run from Who You Are"	May 6, 2021	0.1	0.50	0.1	0.32	0.2	0.82
12	"I Was Made to Love You"	May 13, 2021	0.1	0.50	0.2	0.33	0.3	0.82
13	"One Day You Will Understand"	May 20, 2021	0.1	0.53	0.1	0.37	0.3	0.90
14	"This Feels a Little Cult-y"	June 10, 2021	0.1	0.42	0.2	0.46	0.2	0.88
15	"A New Hope"	June 17, 2021	0.1	0.49	0.2	0.44	0.3	0.93
16	"Fate's a Bitch, Isn't It?"	June 24, 2021	0.1	0.57	0.2	0.47	0.3	1.03

=== Season 4 ===
Viewership and ratings per episode of List of Legacies episodes
No.	Title	Air date	Rating (18–49)	Viewers (millions)	DVR (18–49)	DVR viewers (millions)	Total (18–49)	Total viewers (millions)
1	"You Have to Pick One This Time"	October 14, 2021	0.1	0.33	0.1	0.41	0.2	0.75
2	"There's No I in Team, or Whatever""	October 21, 2021	0.1	0.34	0.1	0.42	0.2	0.81
3	"We All Knew This Day Was Coming"	October 28, 2021	0.1	0.36	—N/a	—N/a	—N/a	—N/a
4	"See You on the Other Side"	November 4, 2021	0.1	0.42	—N/a	—N/a	—N/a	—N/a
5	"I Thought You'd Be Happier to See Me"	November 11, 2021	0.1	0.43	—N/a	—N/a	—N/a	—N/a
6	"You're a Long Way from Home"	November 18, 2021	0.1	0.38	0.1	0.41	0.2	0.79
7	"Someplace Far Away from All This Violence"	December 2, 2021	0.1	0.36	0.2	0.47	0.2	0.82
8	"You Will Remember Me"	December 9, 2021	0.1	0.36	0.1	0.36	0.2	0.72
9	"I Can't Be the One to Stop You"	December 16, 2021	0.1	0.37	—N/a	—N/a	—N/a	—N/a
10	"The Story of My Life"	February 24, 2022	0.1	0.29	—N/a	—N/a	—N/a	—N/a
11	"Follow the Sound of My Voice"	March 3, 2022	0.1	0.36	—N/a	—N/a	—N/a	—N/a
12	"Not All Those Who Wander Are Lost"	March 10, 2022	0.0	0.26	0.1	0.39	0.2	0.65
13	"Was This the Monster You Saw"	March 31, 2022	0.1	0.41	0.1	0.37	0.2	0.78
14	"The Only Way Out Is Through"	April 7, 2022	0.1	0.39	0.1	0.34	0.1	0.73
15	"Everything That Can Be Lost May Also Be Found"	April 14, 2022	0.1	0.43	0.1	0.31	0.2	0.75
16	"I Wouldn't Be Standing Here If It Weren't For You"	April 28, 2022	0.1	0.29	—N/a	—N/a	—N/a	—N/a
17	"Into the Woods"	May 5, 2022	0.1	0.38	—N/a	—N/a	—N/a	—N/a
18	"By the End of This, You'll Know Who You Were Meant to Be"	June 2, 2022	0.1	0.41	—N/a	—N/a	—N/a	—N/a
19	"This Can Only End in Blood"	June 9, 2022	0.1	0.45	—N/a	—N/a	—N/a	—N/a
20	"Just Don't Be A Stranger, Okay?"	June 16, 2022	0.1	0.41	—N/a	—N/a	—N/a	—N/a
