= Eswatini for Positive Living =

Human rights organisation in Eswatini

ESWAPOL
- Eswatini for Positive Living
- Founded: 2001
- Headquarters: Manzini, Eswatini
- Location: Eswatini
- Key people: Siphiwe Hlophe, National Director

Eswatini for Positive Living (ESWAPOL) is a Swazi NGO that was formed in 2001 by Siphiwe Hlophe and four other HIV-positive women. ESWAPOL provides counselling and education, and seeks to improve the living conditions of people who are affected by or infected with HIV in the rural areas, many of whom are women. The organisation has over 1000 members, mostly women, and is highly active in e.g. challenging the policies of the Swazi government on its AIDS and Women's Rights policies.

It is a partner of the UK Charity Positive Women.

== Objectives of ESWAPOL ==
- To provide training and education in HIV/AIDS to rural communities
- To promote positive living and good nutrition to rural communities
- To provide services of counselling to the grieving families (affected)
- To establish income generating projects in rural communities
- To take care of the terminally ill patients in rural communities
- To take care of the orphans and vulnerable children
