= Klaus Mikaelson =

Fictional character from The Vampire Diaries

- The Vampire Diaries Universe character
- Joseph Morgan as Klaus Mikaelson
- First appearance: Dark Reunion:Volume IV; January 1, 1991
- Last appearance: "Just Don't Be a Stranger, Okay?"; Legacies; August 16, 2022
- Created by: L. J. Smith
- Based on: Klaus Mikaelson by L. J. Smith
- Adapted by: Julie Plec; Kevin Williamson
- Portrayed by: Joseph Morgan

In-universe information
- Full name: Niklaus Mikaelson
- Aliases: Klaus; The Hybrid
- Nickname: Nik
- Species: Hybrid (vampire–werewolf)
- Gender: Male
- Occupation: Artist; King of New Orleans (formerly)
- Affiliation: Mikaelson family
- Family: Ansel (biological father); Esther (mother); Mikael (adoptive father/stepfather); Freya Mikaelson (half-sister); Finn Mikaelson (half-brother); Elijah Mikaelson (half-brother); Kol Mikaelson (half-brother); Rebekah Mikaelson (half-sister); Henrik Mikaelson (half- brother)
- Children: Hope Mikaelson (daughter); Marcel Gerard (adoptive son)

Niklaus "Klaus" Mikaelson is a fictional character from the novel The Vampire Diaries and the American television show by the same name, first appearing in The Vampire Diaries: Dark Reunion: Volume IV (1992) as the primary antagonist, and the first known hybrid of an Original vampire and a werewolf. Created by L. J. Smith and adapted by Julie Plec and Kevin Williamson, the character was portrayed by the British actor Joseph Morgan across The Vampire Diaries Universe.

In the novel, Klaus arrives in Mystic Falls seeking to lift a curse that restricts his hybrid abilities, bringing him into conflict with Damon and Stefan and Elena Gilbert. Klaus is portrayed as a fearsome and ruthless vampire who is emotionally damaged due to physical abuse by his stepfather, Mikael.

Klaus is the father of Hope Mikaelson and adoptive father of Marcel Gerard. Later in the television series, he had a brief relationship with Hayley Marshall.

Morgan received positive reviews for his portrayal of Klaus, winning a TV Guide Award and People's Choice Awardand receiving a Teen Choice Award nomination and MTV Millennial Award nomination. Klaus's character development continued in The Originals, in which he moved to New Orleans and became involved in conflicts over family loyalty, political power, and personal redemption. The character also appears posthumously in Legacies.

== Character overview ==
Niklaus Mikaelson is an adapted version of the character named "Klaus," who first appears as a villain in L.J. Smith's first novel collection The Vampire Diaries, "Dark Reunion: Volume IV" published in 1992. Klaus plays a more prominent role following the release of the first four novels, where he becomes the main antagonist of the The Vampire Diaries. He is depicted as an ancient vampire with considerable strength.

In the television series and its spin-off, Klaus is depicted as a vampire-werewolf hybrid who is more than thousand-years-old. He starts off as a villain and evolves into an antihero as his life story is revealed through both shows. The character's relationship with his daughter, Hope, influences his actions, while his distrust of others and willingness to use violence shape his efforts to protect her.

== Character background ==
=== History ===
Niklaus Mikaelson was born in the 10th century His mother, Esther, was a witch originally from Kingdom of Norway who was captured by Viking raiders along with her sister Dahlia. As the son of a witch, Niklaus and his siblings were each born with magic, an inherited gift that flowed through their maternal bloodline. Niklaus was conceived during Esther’s affair with a werewolf named Ansel, though he was raised to believe that Mikael was his biological father. A strict Viking warrior and landowner, Mikael fathered six of Klaus's half-siblings, Freya, Finn, Elijah, Kol, Rebekah, and Henrik. Freya, the eldest, was taken by Dahlia as part of a fertility bargain, though Mikael believed she died during the plague.

Klaus grew up in an abusive household, enduring a traumatic childhood as the sole target of Mikael's abuse, while his siblings were spared. A flashback in The Originals shows him comforting his sister Rebekah during a storm, giving her a hand-carved knight and promising never to leave her side. Esther also attempted to protect her son by giving him a magical necklace that suppressed both his anger and lycanthropy, therefore concealing her adultery from Mikael.

Klaus's younger brother, Henrik, died after a werewolf attacked him while he and Klaus were watching the villagers during a full moon. Following Henrik's death, Esther used magic to transform her surviving children and Mikael into the original vampires, intending to protect them from werewolves.

A coven of witches led by Esther created the curse that suppressed Klaus's werewolf nature and linked it to the moonstone. After learning of his mother's role in suppressing his nature, Klaus kills her and blames Mikael for her death.

== Roles in TV series ==
=== The Vampire Diaries ===
Klaus first appears in the second season of The Vampire Diaries as an antagonist who threatens Elena Gilbert and her friends. His introduction occurs in the episode "Klaus", where he initially appears while possessing the body of Alaric Saltzman before revealing his true identity. Klaus seeks to break the curse that suppresses his werewolf nature by performing a ritual involving three sacrifices: a vampire, a werewolf, and a doppelgänger.

Klaus's pursuit of the Petrova doppelgänger spans several centuries. In 1492, he attempts to sacrifice Katerina Petrova, later known as Katherine Pierce, to break the curse. In the present day, Klaus returns to Mystic Falls and targets Elena Gilbert, another doppelgänger, for the ritual. He uses Elena's blood, a witch, a werewolf, a vampire and the moonstone to unlock his werewolf side. As part of the ritual, he turns Jenna Sommers into a vampire. The season reveals more about Klaus’s family, including his relationships with his parents and siblings. It also reveals that his stepfather, Mikael, has hunted him for centuries. While in Mystic Falls, Klaus develops a relationship with Caroline Forbes (Candice King). After saving her from a werewolf bite, he invites her to the Mikaelsons' ball and dances with her, although she rejects his romantic advances. Klaus is then incapacitated by a desiccation spell cast by Bonnie Bennett and is seemingly killed by Alaric Saltzman. However, a spell cast by Bonnie allows Klaus’s spirit to inhabit Tyler’s body until he is restored to his original form.

In later episodes, Klaus is on the hunt for the cure in order to restore his capacity to sire hybrids. Eventually, he leaves Mystic Falls for New Orleans in an attempt to regain control of the city from Marcel Gerard. Klaus makes a brief appearance at Caroline's high school graduation ceremony, rescuing her, along with Elena and Stefan, from some vindictive witches.

Klaus briefly returns in the series' 100th episode, where he reunites with Caroline. He is later referenced during flash-forwards in season seven, with characters noting his absence from New Orleans for three years. In a crossover storyline, Stefan seeks Klaus's help against Rayna Cruz. Klaus also comforts Caroline following her mother's death. In the series finale, Klaus does not appear in person but sends a generous donation to Caroline to support her school for supernatural children.

=== The Originals ===
In the first season of The Originals, Klaus returns to the French Quarter of New Orleans after hearing a rumor about a plot against him. The reality is that his protégé, Marcel Gerard, has taken over control of New Orleans. Furthermore, Klaus finds out that Hayley Marshall, who was once involved in a relationship with him, is pregnant with his child, the first werewolf-vampire hybrid ever conceived. Although Klaus has some reservations about Hayley’s pregnancy at first, he eventually regards it as a chance for him to redeem himself. Klaus attempts to maintain control of New Orleans while protecting his family from threats posed by witches, vampires, humans and his own siblings.

In the second season, Klaus faces new challenges from his parents. His mother, Esther, attempts to reverse her children's vampirism, while his father, Mikael, returns from the dead after Klaus kills him with the White Oak Stake in The Vampire Diaries episode "Homecoming". Klaus also faces a threat from his aunt Dahlia, who seeks to take custody of Hope. Throughout the season, Klaus's attempts to protect Hope are complicated by his conflicts with Elijah, Rebekah and Hayley, as well as his efforts to outmaneuver Dahlia. Much later, Klaus also kills his biological father, Ansel, after learning that Ansel knows his daughter Hope is alive.

In the third season, Klaus becomes the subject of a prophecy concerning the destruction of the Mikaelson family. The arrival of Tristan de Martel, Aurora de Martel and Lucien Castle brings the prophecy into focus, as their conflicts with the Mikaelsons threaten Klaus and his siblings. During this time, Klaus's relationship with Camille "Cami" O'Connell (Leah Pipes), a psychology student, reveals a gentler side of his personality. Her eventual death, however, drives him further into violence and despair.

In season four, Klaus is imprisoned for five years due to the events of the previous season. Upon his release, he must confront the emergence of the Hollow, a dark entity with intentions toward his daughter. Klaus works with his siblings to protect Hope from the Hollow, but they ultimately separate to contain the entity's power.

In the fifth and final season, Klaus returns to New Orleans after spending several years away from his daughter. He attempts to reach out to Hope, but his efforts are thwarted by the Hollow’s constant pull, which seeks to ruin their family line. In the end, Klaus chooses to sacrifice his life to break the Hollow’s hold over Hope, and Elijah does the same.

=== Legacies ===
Legacies is a television spin-off of The Originals and The Vampire Diaries that follows a younger generation of supernatural characters, including Klaus's daughter, Hope Mikaelson. In the first season, the Necromancer tells Hope that Klaus's spirit remains trapped in Limbo and cannot find peace until she completes her journey.

In the episode "Everything That Can Be Lost May Also Be Found," Rebekah and Freya tell Hope that they have spent the past three years using magic to gather Klaus's remains throughout New Orleans in preparation for a funeral in his honor. Kol reveals that the siblings disagree over what to do with the ashes and how best to commemorate Klaus. They eventually decide to give his ashes to Hope.

In the series finale, Klaus sends a final message to Hope from beyond. In the message, he shares wisdom from his centuries of life and immortality and reaffirms his love for her. He tells her that she is his greatest legacy, calls her his "always and forever", and credits her as the reason for his peace. Afterward, Hope scatters his ashes at the Salvatore School, fulfilling his family's wish to give him a proper farewell.

== Portrayal ==
"He has a depth and an intelligence as an actor, but he's also got this great wicked grin and these dimples that make him seem both fun and naughty at the same time, even as he's being evil or very stern".

— Julie Plec, on the casting of Klaus

Klaus Mikaelson is portrayed by British actor Joseph Morgan, following a screen test process that attracted several hundred candidates. Morgan based his interpretation of the character on the psychological notion of stillness: a person with nothing to fear would have no need to show aggression, making him unpredictable rather than intimidating. He drew inspiration from films featuring charismatic characters who were sociopathic. He also prepared for the role by listening to music, including classical choir songs and film soundtracks.

Morgan discussed his interest in playing antagonistic characters who reveal more sympathetic qualities as their stories develop. He cited James Spader's early performances, Lestat, Hannibal Lecter and T-Bag as influences on his portrayal of Klaus.

== Development ==
=== Characterization ===
Klaus's history of violence and troubled family relationships shapes his behavior. Although he often acts ruthlessly, he also seeks his family's loyalty and affection, while his fear of rejection leads him to push others away. Klaus has been described as a flawed villain whose cruelty and aggression stemmed from his childhood abuse and his mother's betrayal. Joseph Morgan's portrayal of the character, particularly his ability to make Klaus sympathetic despite his actions, and his change in behavior following the birth of his daughter, Hope.

=== Relationships ===
Klaus's relationships with the other characters, particularly Elijah and Rebekah, evolve throughout the series. Rebekah's relationship with Klaus is more chaotic, as her yearning for independence clashes with his need for control. Elijah repeatedly attempts to restrain Klaus's actions while maintaining their family's commitment to the "Always and Forever" vow.

Klaus's relationship with Katerina Petrova began in 1492 in England. He sought to sacrifice Petrova, a doppelgänger, to break his hybrid curse. After being exiled from Bulgaria for having a child out of wedlock, Petrova escaped Klaus by turning herself into a vampire, making her unsuitable for the ritual. In retaliation, Klaus killed her family.

Klaus's friendship with Caroline began in the third season of The Vampire Diaries, when Klaus saved Caroline’s life after she was bitten by a werewolf. Klaus develops a romantic interest in Caroline. She rejects Klaus because of his selfish and cruel behavior, although she sometimes acknowledges his more vulnerable side.

Apart from Caroline, Klaus and Hayley first meet in The Vampire Diaries episode "The Rager", when Hayley visits Mystic Falls to help Tyler break his sire bond to Klaus. Hayley then leaves Mystic Falls but returns, when Klaus saves her from a vampire sent by Katherine Pierce to kill her. The two spend the evening together and had a one-night stand. After noticing a birthmark on Hayley's shoulder, Klaus tells her that he may know something about her family.

Their relationship changes when Hayley discovers that she is pregnant with Klaus's child and travels to New Orleans. As they prepared for the child's birth, Klaus and Hayley develop a better understanding of each other and begin working together to protect their family. After the birth of their daughter, Hope, Klaus and Hayley's relationship deteriorates when Hayley attempts to take Hope away from him. Angered by her actions, Klaus arranges for Dahlia to place the Crescent Curse on Hayley and her pack, forcing them to remain in their werewolf forms for much of the month. In New Orleans, Klaus develops a relationship with Camille O'Connell, who challenges his views and behavior.

== Critical reception and legacy ==
Joseph Morgan has received many accolades for his portrayal of Klaus. His work garnered him several awards and nominations for Teen Choice Awards, MTV Millennial Awards, a TV Guide Award, and a People's Choice Award.

Collider ranked Klaus as the second-best vampire in the franchise, highlighting his supernatural abilities and strength. Critics highlighted Morgan’s skill in blending menace with vulnerability, crafting a complex antagonist who later developed into a tragic antihero. In a review of The Originals episode "Rebirth", Jenevia Kagawa Darcy of TV After Dark praised Morgan's portrayal of Klaus's emotional pain and his development following the loss of his daughter. A review by Dave Golder of GamesRadar+ also praised Morgan's ability to convey a more vulnerable side of Klaus. Screen Rant’s Lindsay Press was a bit more reserved. According to her, The Originals was about Klaus’s family and his need to protect his daughter, while The Vampire Diaries gave us a ruthless villain who always seemed to know his enemies’ next move, which is exactly what made him such a good antagonist. Jenna Wirth of PopSugar praised the depiction of Klaus as likeable despite his violence and liked his growth in The Originals, especially his bond with Hope. The Hollywood Reporter’s critic Daniel Fienberg called Klaus's arrival in season two, along with Elijah and Rebekah, one of the show’s high points. Fienberg also said Morgan, Daniel Gillies and Claire Holt helped carry the show through seasons three and four, calling them “enjoyable to watch. Khushi Khan, writing for the Smart Moves Journal Ijellh, linked Klaus's denial and aggression to his pursuit of power.
