= Joseph Morgan (actor) =

English actor (born 1981)

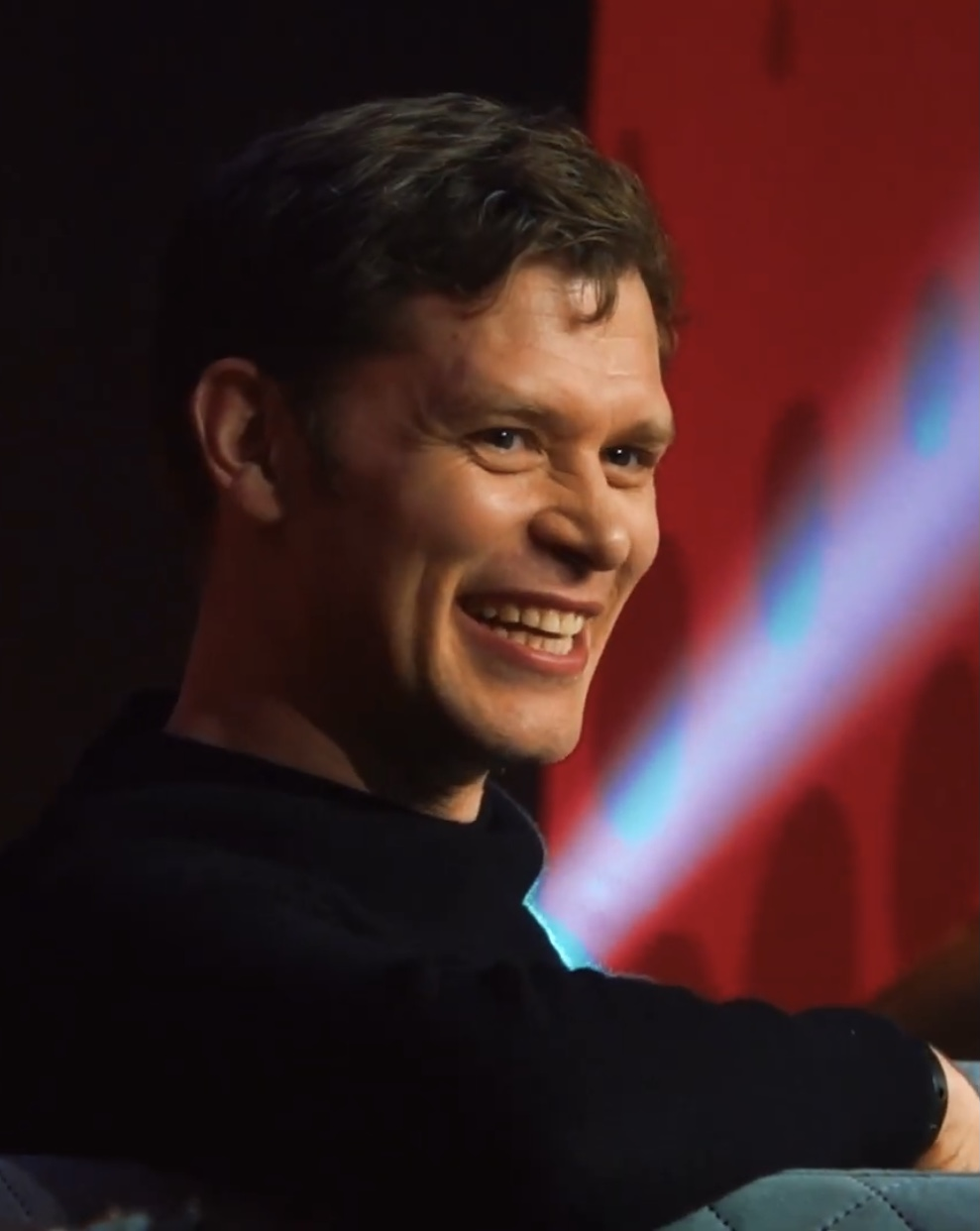
- Morgan in 2022
- Born: Joseph Martin; 16 May 1981 (age 45); London, England
- Education: Royal Central School of Speech and Drama
- Occupation: Actor
- Years active: 2002–present
- Spouse: Persia White (m. 2014)

Joseph Martin Morgan (born 16 May 1981) is an English actor. His accolades including one People's Choice Awards, TV Guide Awards alongside eight nominations for Teen Choice Awards. After studying at Gower College Swansea, he starred in the first series of the Sky One's Hex, portraying Troy and has appeared in supporting roles in films Master and Commander: The Far Side of the World (2003) and Alexander (2004) and the BBC Two television series The Line of Beauty (2006).

Morgan came in attention after playing Klaus Mikaelson on The CW's supernatural television series The Vampire Diaries (2011). He later starred in its spinoff series The Originals (2013–2018) reprising his role as the protagonist. He has portrayed CJack60/Elliot in the Peacock series Brave New World, and Brother Blood in the HBO Max series Titans. Morgan starred as James Ackerson in the Paramount+ series Halo (2024).

== Early life ==
Morgan was born in London, England, but lived in Swansea, Wales for 11 years. He is the oldest child in his family. He was a student at Morriston Comprehensive School and then studied a BTEC Performing Arts course at Gorseinon College (now Gower College Swansea), before moving back to London to study at the Central School of Speech and Drama.

== Career ==
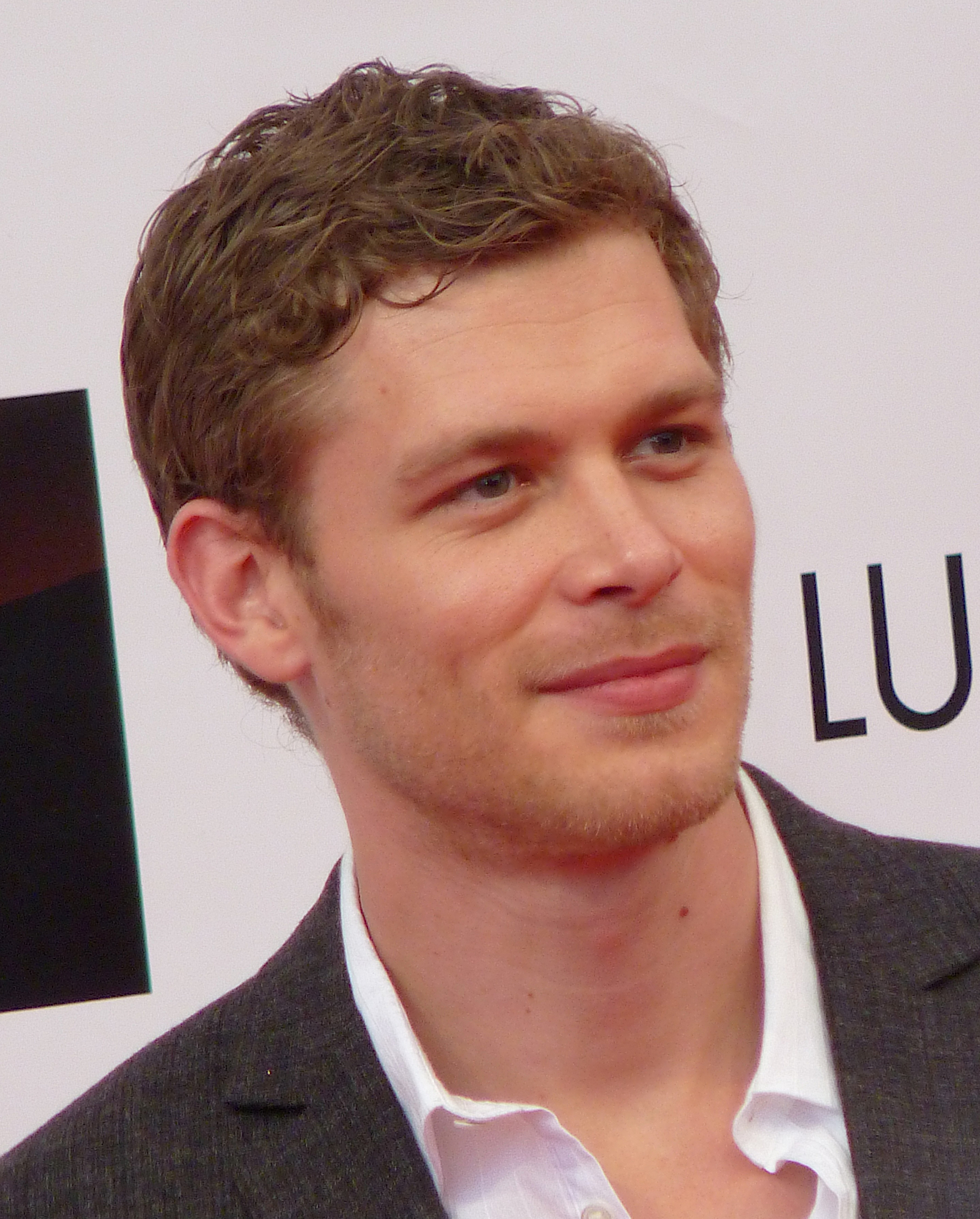
Morgan in 2012

Morgan's first acting audition was for Harry Potter and the Chamber of Secrets, where he auditioned for the role of Tom Riddle. Morgan starred in the first series of the Sky One television series Hex, as Troy and has appeared in supporting roles in films such as Master and Commander: The Far Side of the World (2003) and Alexander (2004) and the BBC Two television series The Line of Beauty. He has also appeared in the television series Doc Martin and Casualty and co-starred in Mansfield Park (2007) alongside Billie Piper. In 2010, he played the title role in the mini-series Ben Hur which first aired on CBC television in Canada and ABC TV in America, on 4 April 2010.

Morgan played Klaus Mikaelson in The CW's supernatural drama The Vampire Diaries, a television adaptation of the book series of the same name as well as in its spin-off The Originals. His work garnered him several nominations for Teen Choice Awards and a People's Choice Award. He also appeared as Lysander in the 2011 film Immortals, alongside Henry Cavill. BuddyTV ranked him number 84 on its list of "TV's Sexiest Men of 2011".

In 2020, Morgan starred in Peacock's science fiction drama Brave New World as CJack60/Elliot. In 2022, Morgan was cast as Brother Blood in the fourth season of the HBO Max series Titans. He also reprised the role of Klaus in the final season of Legacies, a spin-off series of The Originals.

Morgan joined the cast for season 2 of Halo, which aired in February 2024, alongside fellow newcomer Cristina Rodlo. He plays James Ackerson, an operative of the secretive Office of Naval Intelligence, of the United Nations Space Command (UNSC).

== Personal life ==
Morgan met actress Persia White on the set of The Vampire Diaries. They began dating in 2011 and became engaged in 2014. They married on 5 July 2014 in Ocho Rios, Jamaica.

He has been a vegan since 2014.

Morgan is a supporter of the charity Positive Women.

== Filmography ==
=== Film ===
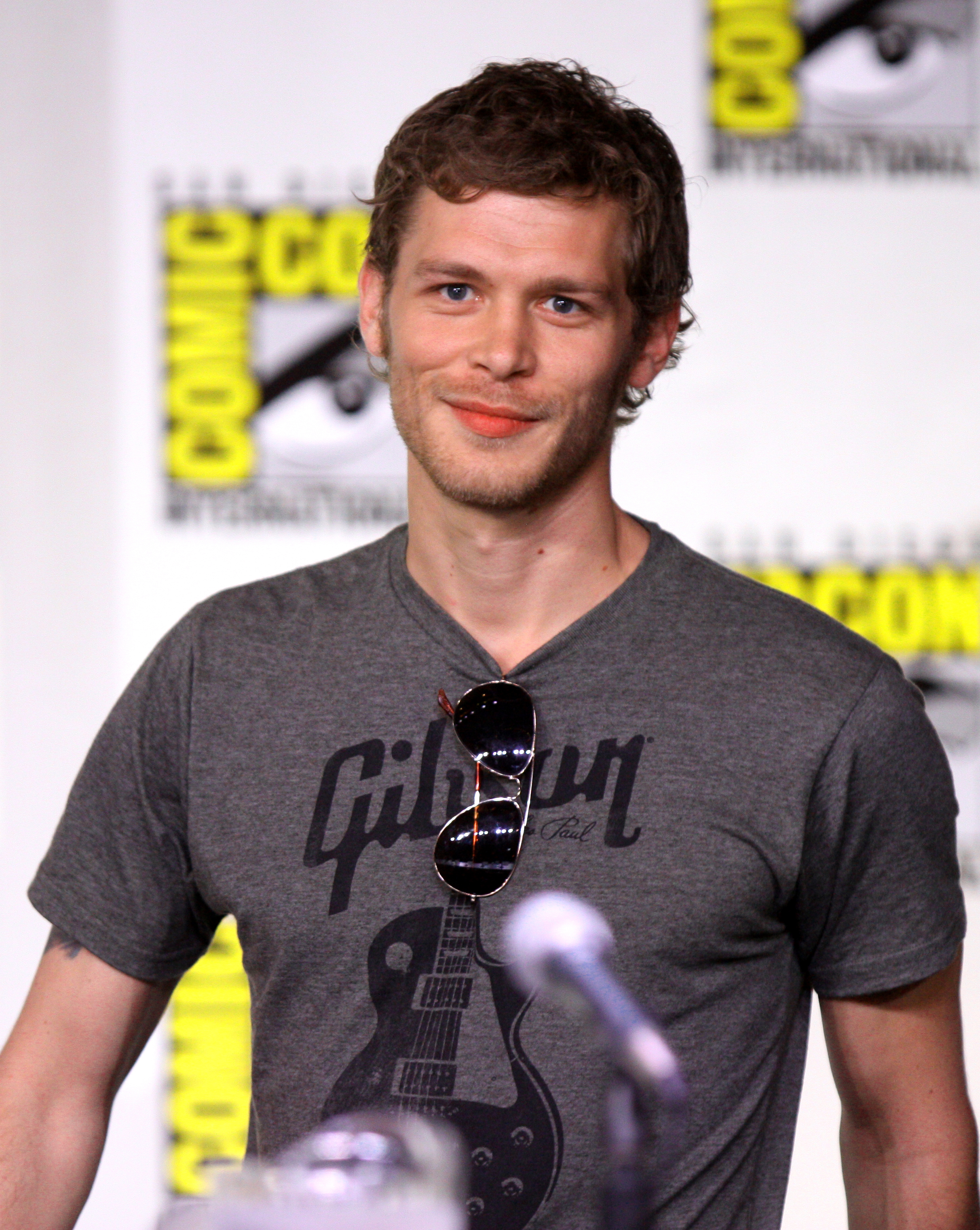
Morgan at the 2011 Comic Con in San Diego

Year	Title	Role	Notes
2003	Eroica	Matthias	
2003	Master and Commander: The Far Side of the World	William Warley, Captain of the Mizzentop	
2004	Alexander	Philotas	
2006	Kenneth Williams: Fantabulosa!	Alfie	
2007	Mansfield Park	William Price	
2007	Mister Lonely	James Dean	
2011	Angels Crest	Rusty	
2011	The Grind	Paul	
2011	Immortals	Lysander	
2011	With These Hands	George	Short film; also writer, director and producer
2013	Revelation	—N/a	Short film; also writer, director and producer
2013	Open Grave	Nathan	
2014	Armistice	A.J. Budd	
2014	500 Miles North	James Hogg	
2015	Desiree	Eric Ashworth	
2017	Carousel	Kit	Short film; also writer, director and producer
TBA	Herbert West: Reanimator	Herbert West	Also executive producer

=== Television ===
Year	Title	Role	Notes
2002	Spooks	Reverend Parr	1 episode
2003	Henry VIII	Thomas Culpeper	1 episode
2004	Hex	Troy	5 episodes
2005	William and Mary	Callum	3 episodes
2006	The Line of Beauty	Jasper	1 episode
2007	Silent Witness	Matthew Williams	2 episodes
2007	Doc Martin	Mick Mabley	5 episodes
2008–2009	Casualty	Tony Reece	8 episodes
2010	Ben Hur	Judah Ben-Hur	Miniseries
2011–2016	The Vampire Diaries	Klaus Mikaelson	Recurring role (season 2); main role (seasons 3–4); special guest (seasons 5, 7)
2013–2018	The Originals	Klaus Mikaelson	Main role
2019	Animal Kingdom	Jed	Recurring role (season 4)
2020	Brave New World	CJack60	Main role
2022	Legacies	Klaus Mikaelson	Special guest star (season 4)
2022–2023	Titans	Sebastian Sanger / Brother Blood	Main role (season 4)
2024	Halo	James Ackerson	Main role (season 2)

=== As a director ===
- The Originals (2016–2018), 3 episodes: "Behind the Black Horizon", "Keepers of the House", "Ne Me Quitte Pas"

== Awards and nominations ==
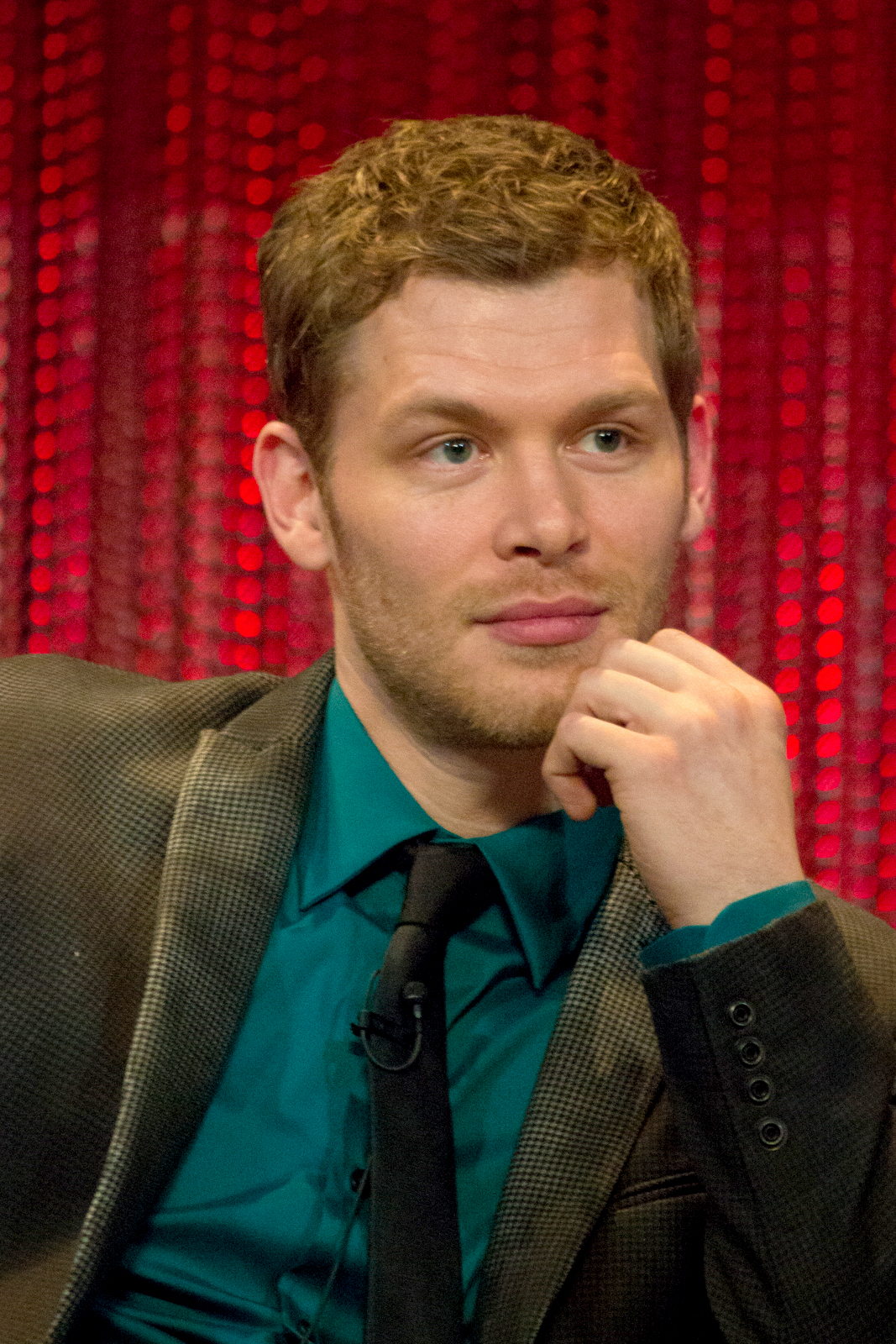
Joseph Morgan at PaleyFest 2014

Year	Award	Category	Work	Result	Ref.
2011	Teen Choice Awards	Choice TV Villain	The Vampire Diaries	Nominated	
2012	Teen Choice Awards	Choice TV Villain	The Vampire Diaries	Nominated	
2013	Teen Choice Awards	Choice TV Villain	The Vampire Diaries	Nominated	
2013	TV Guide Award	Choice TV Villain	The Vampire Diaries	Won	
2014	People's Choice Awards	Favorite Actor In A New TV Series	The Originals	Won	
2014	Teen Choice Awards	Choice TV Actor: Sci-Fi/Fantasy	The Originals	Nominated	
2014	MTV Millennial Awards	El Mejor Chupasangre (En: Best Vampire)	The Originals	Nominated	
2015	Teen Choice Awards	Choice TV Actor: Sci-Fi/Fantasy	The Originals	Nominated	
2016	Teen Choice Awards	Choice TV: Liplock (with Leah Pipes)	The Originals	Nominated	
2017	Teen Choice Awards	Choice Sci-Fi/Fantasy TV Actor	The Originals	Nominated	
2018	Teen Choice Awards	Choice Sci-Fi/Fantasy TV Actor	The Originals	Nominated	
