= The Vampire Diaries season 3 =

The Vampire Diaries
- Season 3
- Season 3 DVD cover
- Showrunners: Kevin Williamson; Julie Plec
- Starring: Nina Dobrev; Paul Wesley; Ian Somerhalder; Steven R. McQueen; Kat Graham; Zach Roerig; Candice Accola; Michael Trevino; Matt Davis; Joseph Morgan
- No. of episodes: 22

Release
- Original network: The CW
- Original release: September 15, 2011 – May 10, 2012

Season chronology
- ← Previous; Season 2 Next → Season 4

The Vampire Diaries, an American supernatural drama, was officially renewed for a third season by the CW on April 26, 2011. The season aired from September 15, 2011, to May 10, 2012, and consisted of 22 episodes. The plot focused on the story of Klaus' origin, his relation with his family and revealed more about the Original family. The third season opened to generally positive reviews. The season takes a gap from the last season and begins with Elena Gilbert's 18th birthday, with all series regulars returning with the exception of Sara Canning, whose character, Jenna Sommers, was killed off in the previous season. Joseph Morgan's character Klaus became a series regular after previously appearing in a recurring role.

== Cast ==
=== Main ===
- Nina Dobrev as Elena Gilbert / Katherine Pierce
- Paul Wesley as Stefan Salvatore
- Ian Somerhalder as Damon Salvatore
- Steven R. McQueen as Jeremy Gilbert
- Kat Graham as Bonnie Bennett
- Zach Roerig as Matt Donovan
- Candice Accola as Caroline Forbes
- Michael Trevino as Tyler Lockwood
- Matt Davis as Alaric Saltzman
- Joseph Morgan as Niklaus Mikaelson

=== Recurring ===
- Claire Holt as Rebekah Mikaelson
- Susan Walters as Carol Lockwood
- Torrey DeVitto as Meredith Fell
- Marguerite MacIntyre as Liz Forbes
- Daniel Gillies as Elijah Mikaelson
- Alice Evans as Esther
- Sebastian Roché as Mikael
- Persia White as Abby Bennett Wilson
- Kayla Ewell as Vicki Donovan
- Malese Jow as Anna
- Nathaniel Buzolic as Kol Mikaelson
- Casper Zafer as Finn Mikaelson
- Jack Coleman as Bill Forbes

=== Guest ===
- Robert Ri'chard as Jamie Wilson
- Cassidy Freeman as Sage
- Kimberly Drummond as Mindy
- David Gallagher as Ray Sutton
- Taylor Kinney as Mason Lockwood
- Zane Stephens as Tony
- Daniel Newman as Daniel Warren
- Kelly Hu as Pearl
- Arielle Kebbel as Lexi Branson
- Jasmine Guy as Sheila Bennett
- Stephen Martines as Frederick
- Dawn Olivieri as Andie Starr
- Cherilyn Wilson as Sofie
- Lauren Cohan as Rose
- Sara Canning as Jenna Sommers

== Episodes ==
| No. overall | No. in season | Title | Directed by | Written by | Original release date | Prod. code | U.S. viewers (millions) |
|---|---|---|---|---|---|---|---|
| 45 | 1 | "The Birthday" | John Behring | Kevin Williamson & Julie Plec | September 15, 2011 | 2J6001 | 3.10 |
Elena's eighteenth birthday arrives and Caroline holds a party. Klaus and Stefan hunt for werewolves so Klaus can create more hybrids. Damon returns Elena's necklace to her for her birthday. Stefan returns home to warn Damon to stop tracking them by killing Andie. Stefan later calls Elena, but does not say anything and she promises she will find him. Jeremy continues to see Vicki and Anna's ghosts. Alaric moves out. Caroline is jealous when Tyler brings a date to the party, and the two end up sleeping together. As Caroline leaves, Carol shoots her with vervain.
| 46 | 2 | "The Hybrid" | Joshua Butler | Al Septien & Turi Meyer | September 22, 2011 | 2J6002 | 2.52 |
Elena and Alaric head to Tennessee and are followed by Damon. Klaus continues to try to create hybrids but fails when the hybrids end up bleeding to death or went crazy and Klaus had to kill them himself. Apparently so because Elena is still alive. Stefan meets up with Damon and tells him to protect Elena. Damon tells Elena that he is wrong about his brother and that Stefan can still be saved. Matt tries to connect with Vicki's ghost through Jeremy. Tyler realises his mother had captured Caroline, who is still being held captive. Tyler then shows his mother he is a werewolf as it was a full moon that night, showing that he was also a monster. Bill, Caroline's dad goes to see Caroline.
| 47 | 3 | "The End of the Affair" | Chris Grismer | Caroline Dries | September 29, 2011 | 2J6003 | 2.74 |
Klaus and Stefan arrive in Chicago, where they knew each other during one of Stefan's previous periods as a Ripper in the 1920s. It is revealed that Klaus knew Stefan in the 1920s. Stefan met Klaus and Rebekah in a bar where Stefan fell in love with Rebekah and become like a brother to Klaus. Klaus and Rebekah had to leave and Klaus compelled Stefan to forget them. Klaus then daggers Rebekah when she chooses Stefan. In present day, he removes the dagger keeping her demobilized as she has what Gloria (a powerful witch) needs to help Klaus create hybrids. It is revealed that what Gloria needs is the necklace Stefan had given Elena. Damon gets a tip on Stefan and Klaus' whereabouts from Katherine so he and Elena follow the trail. They go to Stefan's old apartment, where Elena sees Stefan's list of victims. While there, Stefan and Klaus arrive. Stefan sees Elena hiding in his closet, but does not tell Klaus. Tyler tries to rescue Caroline, who is being tortured by her father, who believes he can change her urge to feed on blood by burning her in sunlight every time she feels the urge.
| 48 | 4 | "Disturbing Behavior" | Wendey Stanzler | Brian Young | October 6, 2011 | 2J6004 | 2.63 |
In Chicago, Klaus uses Gloria the witch to find out why his hybrids are not turning out the way he planned and Gloria discovers that Stefan is hiding the fact that the doppelgänger is still alive. She tortures Stefan, but Katherine saves him. Back in Mystic Falls, Damon finds out Bill is impervious to compulsion and wants control of the Council. He temporarily kills Alaric but Alaric comes back to life. Damon then tries to kill Bill but Caroline saves her father by giving him her blood and has a fight with Damon. Meanwhile, Bonnie returns to Mystic Falls and Jeremy tells her about seeing his ex-girlfriends as ghosts. Stefan also tries to find out what Klaus and his sister Rebekah are running from. The answer turns out to be Mikael. Katherine steals Elena's necklace that can contact the Original Witch and teams up with Damon. Klaus brings Stefan back to Mystic Falls to find out what he is hiding.
| 49 | 5 | "The Reckoning" | John Behring | Michael Narducci | October 13, 2011 | 2J6005 | 2.89 |
A senior prank night takes a deadly turn when Klaus finds out that Elena is still alive. Klaus threatens Elena by feeding Tyler his blood and kills him. He tells Bonnie that if she does not find a way to create hybrids, Tyler dies. He also tells Stefan to feed on Elena. Stefan tries to stop his urge, but Klaus makes him turn off his emotions and feed on her. Klaus finds out that Elena's blood is needed to create more hybrids. Meanwhile, Katherine and Damon go on a road trip to find a way to kill Klaus. Katherine remembers that Pearl told her about Mikael, the vampire hunter who was also a vampire. Matt, in an attempt to connect with Vicki, commits suicide. In a vision he sees her, and she tells him she can come back to life and has a message for Bonnie. Elena is in the hospital while a nurse, compelled by Klaus, takes her blood. Klaus is waiting to abduct Elena, but he flees when Damon tells him that Mikael is coming. Damon then saves Elena. Moments later, Stefan returns. Jeremy and Katherine find Mikael's tomb and watch as he opens his eyes.
| 50 | 6 | "Smells Like Teen Spirit" | Rob Hardy | Julie Plec & Caroline Dries | October 20, 2011 | 2J6006 | 3.03 |
Elena and her friends begin their senior year of high school and she remembers that it has been one year since she met Stefan. Elena is frustrated by her helplessness, so she convinces Alaric to teach her about protecting herself from vampires. Mikael wakes up and bites Katherine. Bonnie and Jeremy are having issues since Jeremy keeps seeing Anna. Klaus' sister, Rebekah, moves in with the Salvatores and attends school. Matt continues to see the ghost of Vicki, and she convinces him to perform a ritual that allows her to come and go from his world as she pleases. She says a witch from the other side promised her that if she killed Elena she can come back forever. The gang attends a bonfire, where Elena, Damon, and Alaric try to capture Stefan. They learn Tyler is sired to Klaus since Klaus essentially made him who he is. Rebekah sets her sights on Tyler. Elena saves Stefan from a fire after Vicki tries to kill Elena in Alaric's van. Jeremy and Anna realize he can feel her. Vicki is eventually restored back to the other side by Bonnie and Matt while Damon goes home, where Mason Lockwood appears in front of him.
| 51 | 7 | "Ghost World" | David Jackson | Rebecca Sonnenshine | October 27, 2011 | 2J6007 | 3.28 |
Mason, in ghost form, chains Damon up and tortures him. Damon tells Bonnie about Mason torturing him. Elena realizes she needs Lexi to help bring Stefan back and asks Jeremy to contact her. As Bonnie tries to send the ghosts away but instead gives them physical form, Jeremy kisses Anna and Elena sees them. Bonnie is reunited with Grams who tells her that she needs to restore balance of nature. Damon and Alaric see Mason at the Grill who says he wants an apology and to help Tyler. Stefan sees Lexi who tries to help him find his humanity by working with Elena. Mason tells Damon that he knows where to find a weapon that can kill Klaus, so they search for it buried underneath the Lockwood estate. The tomb vampires return and attack the founding families. Anna took the necklace that sends the vampires back but gives it back to Jeremy. Bonnie sends all the ghosts away. Just before that, Mason shows Damon a secret cave containing the story of the Originals but disappears before he can tell Damon what was inside. Lexi disappeared before Stefan turns back on his humanity and Elena decides to live her life while she waits for Stefan to decide he wants to hope for the future again. Bonnie realizes the necklace was not destroyed and Alaric finds mysterious cave drawings.
| 52 | 8 | "Ordinary People" | J. Miller Tobin | Story by : Nick Wauters; Teleplay by : Julie Plec & Caroline Dries | November 3, 2011 | 2J6008 | 3.51 |
With help from Elena and Bonnie, Alaric tries to decipher the meaning behind his recent discovery. From the writings on the cave wall, he deciphers that Mikael is Papa Original, as Damon puts it, the father of Elijah, Rebekah and their other siblings. Elena and Rebekah engage in a mean-girl power struggle, until Rebekah reveals some of her family's ancient secrets and the violent past she shares with Klaus and Elijah. She reveals how the family became vampires. They were once neighbors to a village of werewolves and one night, Klaus and their brother, Henrik, snuck out to see the men change into wolves when it went wrong, and Henrik was killed. The family was distraught and the loss made Mikael obsessed with making the family invulnerable. His wife, a witch, the Original witch, aided them in becoming vampires but nature found ways of ensuring that they had weaknesses. Rebekah also tells Elena that it was Mikael who killed their mother when he found out about her infidelity to him but it is later on deciphered from the writings on the cave wall that it was actually the hybrid, Klaus, who killed his mother, in a fit of temper and rage. This new revelation causes Rebekah to lose faith in her brother. Damon tries a reckless new approach to make a breakthrough with Stefan by releasing him from his imprisonment and they're both surprised by an unlikely ally, Mikael, who has been freed by Katherine.
| 53 | 9 | "Homecoming" | Joshua Butler | Evan Bleiweiss | November 10, 2011 | 2J6009 | 3.17 |
On the night of the Homecoming dance, Rebekah opens up to Elena about why the evening is so important to her, leaving Elena with conflicting emotions, Elena then stakes Rebekah leaving her unable to attend the Homecoming dance, Meanwhile, Damon and Elena team up with Mikael to come up with a plan to kill Klaus. They leave Stefan behind, afraid of him betraying them. Tyler warns Caroline that Klaus is prepared for whatever they plan to do, but vervains her to keep her out of it. Damon and Tyler fight, but Bonnie keeps them from killing each other. Mikael tries to lure Klaus out of the house by threatening and then killing Elena, revealed in the end to be Katherine. Damon reveals he has the White Oak stake and tries to stake Klaus. However Klaus is saved by Stefan as he pushes Damon out of the way. Klaus then stakes Mikeal leaving him to burn to death, revealing Stefan has now earned his freedom from compulsion. Tyler tells Caroline it is better being sired to Klaus because he does not have to turn any more. Stefan is revealed to be working with Katherine. Katherine had woken Stefan in order to save Damon from Klaus' hybrids, who were ordered to kill him in case of his death. Stefan managed to care enough to save him, thanks to Katherine convincing him. Stefan is finally able to trap Klaus in a conflicting position by taking his daggered family from him.
| 54 | 10 | "The New Deal" | John Behring | Michael Narducci | January 5, 2012 | 2J6010 | 3.32 |
Bonnie has a dream about the witches' massacre house, where she finds the coffins of the Originals. One coffin opens and she sees the body of Klaus with the Original Witch's necklace. Back in reality, Stefan asks Bonnie for help in hiding the coffins from Klaus. Bonnie, with help from the dead witches, can make the coffins invisible. She informs Stefan that the coffin she saw opening in her dream is the key to tormenting Klaus but it is sealed with a spell. Klaus wants Elena and Damon to find Stefan in order to get his coffins back but when they refuse, he gets a hybrid to run over Jeremy who has been off vervain due to Tyler's influence and has been compelled by Klaus. Alaric pushes Jeremy out of the way and gets run over. His ring brings him back to life but does not heal him; he needs vampire blood to heal him. Alaric meets Dr. Meredith Fell (Torrey DeVitto), who is intrigued with his amazing ability to heal. Stefan reveals to Damon that he stopped the plan to kill Klaus to save Damon's life. Stefan then reveals his plan to torment Klaus in revenge for what Klaus turned him into and refuses to return the coffins, despite Klaus' attempts to kill Jeremy. Elena makes a deal with Klaus to spare Jeremy's life in return for Rebekah's daggered body. When Elena reveals to Klaus that Rebekah wants him dead because he killed their mother, Klaus keeps the dagger in her. Elena asks Damon to compel Jeremy to leave Mystic Falls and move away with family friends so he can have a normal life away from the supernatural. Elena thanks Damon for everything and Damon admits that because Stefan saved him, he cannot feel guilty for wanting what he wants (Elena, his brother's girl). He then says "if I'm going to feel guilty, I'll feel guilty about this" and kisses Elena.
| 55 | 11 | "Our Town" | Wendey Stanzler | Rebecca Sonnenshine | January 12, 2012 | 2J6011 | 2.86 |
Although Caroline is in no mood to celebrate her eighteenth birthday, Elena, Bonnie and Matt surprise her with a funeral to celebrate the old Caroline Forbes. Bonnie disagrees with Elena making Jeremy leave town by compelling him to. Damon and Stefan disagree on the best way to handle Klaus, and a reckless Stefan decides to test his theory by taking things to dangerous extremes and beheading one of Klaus' hybrids. Bonnie is concerned when Elena tells her about Jeremy's new plans. At a Founder's meeting, Alaric once again runs into Dr. Fell, who is in the middle of an argument with her ex-boyfriend, the medical examiner. Klaus asked Tyler to bite Caroline to punish Stefan. Tyler refuses to go along with Klaus' latest demand, and is surprised when Klaus seems to accept his decision. Stefan tries to behead another hybrid but is stopped by Damon. Tyler went to meet Caroline where she was having her birthday party and told her that he loves her and kisses her but accidentally bites her. Stefan kidnaps Elena and threatens to drive off Wickery Bridge and make her a vampire so Klaus cannot make any hybrids. Klaus gives in and Stefan stops the car. Stefan and Elena fight about his methods and he reveals he does not care about what she thinks of him any more. Klaus goes to save Caroline after Tyler tells him what he did. Klaus tells Caroline of the joys of being a vampire and lets her decide if she wants to be saved. She tells him she does not want to die, so he feeds her his blood to save her. Jeremy left Mystic Falls as he was compelled by Damon and Caroline wakes to find a bracelet left by Klaus. Elena goes back to Wickery Bridge and says good-bye to the Elena that was supposed to die with her parents. Dr. Fell's ex-boyfriend is found dead in the woods with a stake in his heart although he is not a vampire.
| 56 | 12 | "The Ties That Bind" | John Dahl | Brian Young | January 19, 2012 | 2J6012 | 2.71 |
Bonnie realizes she needs to find her mother, Abby, to get the sealed coffin open. Tyler gets Bill to come and help him resist the sire bond. Klaus negotiates with Stefan to control the coffins of his family members. Elena and Bonnie go to see Abby and meet Jamie, a surrogate son of Abby's. Abby returns and tells them she is the one that desiccated Mikael. Damon investigates Dr. Meredith Fell and the death of her boyfriend. She then vervains him and drains some of his blood. Tyler learns to break the sire bond, he must turn and own the pain of being a werewolf. Abby tells Bonnie she did not come back because she had a chance at a new, normal life. Abby offers to help Bonnie but drugs her as Jamie shoots Stefan, revealing that he has been compelled. They kidnap Bonnie and Jamie is compelled to shoot himself if she does not give up the location. Elena tricks Jamie into freeing her and she knocks him out as she saves Stefan. Elena tells Stefan about her kiss with Damon. Klaus gets to the coffins, but Damon hides the big, sealed coffin. Alaric discovers a secret about Meredith: she uses vampire blood to treat her patients. Bill is transported to the hospital with animal bites by Tyler and she uses Damon's blood to save him. Abby tells Bonnie she will help her if she can get her magic back. Bill tells Tyler he must turn until there's no more pain to break the sire bond. Alaric kisses Meredith. Stefan punches Damon and Damon reveals he pulled the dagger out of Elijah, as Elijah kills one of the hybrids.
| 57 | 13 | "Bringing Out the Dead" | Jeffrey Hunt | Turi Meyer & Al Septien | February 2, 2012 | 2J6013 | 2.74 |
Klaus and Elijah fight, but stop as Klaus reveals Mikael is dead. Elena and Alaric are shocked when they learn of Elena's fingerprints on the wooden stake that killed medical examiner Brian Walters. Elena suspects Stefan, but he denies it. Stefan and Bonnie take Abby to the sealed coffin for her to figure out to open it. Caroline discovered someone stabbed Bill, killing him and turning him into a vampire. Along with the lively company of Elijah; Damon, Stefan and Klaus agree to consult a truce over dinner, with Damon trying to keep Stefan on good behavior. Bill decides not to complete the transition leaving Caroline distraught. Elena and Alaric suspect Meredith of finding and using their weapons to murder the coroner and Bill. Elena goes to comfort Caroline, and Matt shows up as well. Elijah and Klaus tell Damon and Stefan of Tatia, the original Doppelgänger. It was Tatia's blood used to turn them into vampires. Abby and Bonnie manage to break the seal. Klaus negotiates to bring Elena with him if they would leave. Elena and Matt arrive back home to find Alaric wounded, and to save him Elena, being a supernatural doppelgänger, had to kill him, so that he could come back to life. Klaus threatens to burn Stefan but everything takes a turn when the daggers are pulled out of Kol (Nathaniel Buzolic), Finn (Casper Zafer), and Rebekah (Claire Holt), who are Klaus's siblings. Caroline says good-bye to her father and Matt stays with Elena while they wait for Alaric to wake up. Stefan tells Damon that he loves Elena and Damon replies "so do I". Sheriff Forbes reveals the attacker is not Meredith as Alaric wakes back up. Bonnie and Abby are out cold as the sealed coffin is revealed to be open. Esther, the supposedly deceased mother of the original family, is revealed to have been in the coffin and wants to have her family back.
| 58 | 14 | "Dangerous Liaisons" | Chris Grismer | Caroline Dries | February 9, 2012 | 2J6014 | 3.08 |
Matt and Elena leave the hospital, where Rebekah tries to attack her before Elijah saves her. Elena is surprised to receive an invitation to a formal ball and a meeting with Esther. When Damon and Stefan hear the party is being hosted at Klaus's newly renovated mansion, they both insist on attending the event with her. Tyler calls Caroline and apologizes, saying he is still working on fixing himself. Caroline and Matt also receive invitations to the ball from Klaus and Rebekah, respectively. Despite telling Damon and Stefan she would not go to the ball, Elena shows up anyway. The ball commences with a dance, Elena with Damon, Caroline with Klaus, Matt with Rebekah. Elena then dances with Stefan and then convinces him to help her get to Esther. Elena learns that Esther intents to kill the originals by linking their lives together and then sacrificing Finn by his own will. Then she must decide who she can trust with her new information. Caroline discovers a more sensitive and romantic side of Klaus no one would have suspected. Elena gets all the Originals to drink and link themselves. Elena reaches out to Stefan but he says that if he feels again all he feels is pain. Finally, after an evening of violence and dashed hopes, Damon finds a new way to cope by sleeping with Rebekah.
| 59 | 15 | "All My Children" | Pascal Verschooris | Evan Bleiweiss & Michael Narducci | February 16, 2012 | 2J6015 | 2.90 |
After Elena finds out about Damon's latest indiscretion, she second guesses helping to kill the Originals and is frustrated with her friends for not agreeing with her. Elijah confronts her and reveals he knows she lied. He then leaves Elena in a cave. Meanwhile, Bonnie and her mother, Abby, find themselves playing a part in a ritual to appease the spirits of nature (by killing all the Original vampires with a spell requiring 2 generations of Bennett witches). Rebekah keeps Elena in the cave as Elijah goes to Stefan and Damon. Elijah tells them they can either stop Esther from completing the ritual by killing either Bonnie or Abby or Rebekah kills Elena. This they turn to Meredith and Alaric for help in killing Kol which ends up dagger the others linked to him. Elena escapes from Rebekah's watch and hides in the cave where no vampires can enter. Klaus finds out about the ritual as well. Rebekah tries to set Elena on fire but Elena reasons with her before she can. Klaus, Elijah, and Kol find Esther and Finn about to complete the ritual. Damon and Stefan find Bonnie and Abby and decide the only solution is for Damon to turn Abby, thus preventing her to be a witch anymore. Stefan reveals he has not had human blood since he almost drove Elena off the bridge. Elijah writes Elena a letter of apology and realizes they are not as good as they think they are. Kol flees, Elijah says he is leaving, and Esther and Finn have fled their family. Rebekah realizes the White Oak tree is still out there. Alaric wakes to find weapons and case files and Meredith shoots him.
| 60 | 16 | "1912" | John Behring | Julie Plec & Elisabeth R. Finch | March 15, 2012 | 2J6016 | 2.64 |
In 1912, Zachariah Salvatore, a council member is murdered in the same way they have been in present day. Flash forward, Alaric has been put into jail by the Sheriff after Meredith said he came at her with a knife and she had to shoot him. The present-day murders in Mystic Falls remind Damon of a similar crime spree a century earlier. In flashbacks to 1912, Stefan and Damon attend Zachariah's funeral and learn he was not the first council member murdered. Rebekah searches for the White Oak tree in town and she needs the Salvatores to find it. Damon recalls a beautiful vampire, named Sage (Cassidy Freeman). Elena questions Meredith, who reveals she knows more about Alaric's past than Elena does. Elena and Matt break into Meredith's apartment and find a secret box of files on the Council members. Sage shows Damon a whole new way to exist: a woman is not only a prey, but also a pleasure. Matt and Elena find a Gilbert journal that belonged to the original Jonathan Gilbert's granddaughter, but Meredith came home before they could search more and she catches them. Rebekah and Damon follow Stefan as Damon feeds on a girl, trying to force him into feeding on a woman in order to learn how to fight his urges. Elena and Matt find Stefan feeding on the woman but Matt pulls her away. Elena and Matt go back to her house, where Matt gives her back the Gilbert journal. Alaric is released from jail after the coroner's office sends an error about time of death. In 1912, Damon convinces Stefan to drink human blood, but Stefan kills the woman and turns into a Ripper. In present time, Damon pledges to help Stefan in a way he did not in the past. Stefan reveals Samantha Gilbert confessed to the murders in 1922, but Damon says he already had killed her. Meredith comes to explain herself to Alaric, saying that it was him that committed the murders all because of the Gilbert ring.
| 61 | 17 | "Break On Through" | Lance Anderson | Rebecca Sonnenshine | March 22, 2012 | 2J6017 | 2.69 |
Meredith cannot find anything wrong with Alaric and he believes he is going crazy because of the ring so he gives it back to Elena. Elena and Damon fight about how to teach Stefan to feed on human blood. Caroline brings Abby some blood, but Abby is not handling being a vampire well after losing her connection to the earth. Sage returns to Mystic Falls to find Finn, the love of her life. Stefan tells her that Samantha Gilbert went crazy and killed herself. Damon seduces Rebekah with Sage's help. Bonnie says she can reverse the damage done to Alaric with a spell. Damon and Sage find the way to kill the originals: the old Wickery Bridge was made of white oak tree. Alaric attacks Meredith, but luckily Stefan and Elena arrive in time to save Meredith and Stefan manages to control his blood lust. Sage finds out that the Originals are linked and that Finn will be killed as well, so she betrays Damon and Rebekah burns the wood. Bonnie heals Alaric and forgives Elena for her part in her mother's death. Bonnie's mother leaves after losing control and attacking her surrogate son, Jamie. Damon finds another way to kill the Originals.
| 62 | 18 | "The Murder of One" | J. Miller Tobin | Caroline Dries | March 29, 2012 | 2J6018 | 2.44 |
Damon and Stefan make plans to destroy Klaus with their new weapon. Klaus and Rebekah convince Finn to cooperate with their plans to break the link when they reunite him with Sage. Rebekah gets carried away with her own plans out of revenge against Damon for using her to steal her memories of the remaining white oak wood. She stakes Damon with a dagger, then takes him to Klaus' mansion, chains him to the ceiling and cuts him to bleed out his protective vervain. Klaus coerces Bonnie into breaking Esther's linking spell. Bonnie is unsure if she can perform the unlinking spell, but Klaus threatens her mother and shows her that he has Kol watching Jeremy. Stefan lures Finn out of the bar where he was having tequila with Sage, and fails to stake him, but Elena and Matt manage to use Matt's stake to kill Finn. As Finn expires, Bonnie successfully breaks the linking spell making Finn the only Original to die. At the mansion, Rebekah manipulates Damon's hallucinations so he believes he and Elena are about to kiss after she saves Damon and urges him to drink her blood to recover. But then Damon realizes how desperate Rebekah is for attention and love, and that she is actually torturing him for violating these feelings rather than for tricking her to access her memories. Stefan is attacked by Sage, who is upset over Finn's demise. Sage is about to end Stefan when she coughs up blood and dies. Stefan, Elena, and Caroline realize that if an Original is killed, their entire vampire bloodline dies. Stefan goes to negotiate with Klaus and finds Damon bloody and half-conscious. To Damon's disappointment he brings eight of the stakes with him in exchange for his brother. Klaus compels Damon to admit there are actually eleven stakes in total. After failing to use his own stake to kill Klaus Stefan hands it over and promises to bring the other two. Tired of revenge, Rebekah releases Damon as a sign of good faith and leaves with the eight stakes. Caroline and Elena puzzle over the vampire bloodlines and realize that Tyler is a part of Klaus', and he would die if Klaus were killed. Stefan and Elena share a conversation about their feelings and Elena admits she does not know how to feel about her love for both Stefan and Damon. Damon goes to retrieve the last white oak stake but finds that Alaric's vampire hating alter ego has hidden it and Alaric can not even guess where.
| 63 | 19 | "Heart of Darkness" | Chris Grismer | Brian Young & Evan Bleiweiss | April 19, 2012 | 2J6019 | 2.21 |
Stefan tells Elena he believes she has feelings for Damon. He sends them on a trip together: first, to make sure Jeremy is safe in Denver and to see if his special abilities can reveal from which Original they are descended and second, to find out if Elena has feelings for Damon. While they are gone, Stefan will try to get the location of the final white oak stake out of Alaric's alter-ego. Damon and Elena find Jeremy and ask him to talk to Rose on the other side, but they are interrupted by Kol, whom Damon neutralizes with a stake. Damon and Elena take Jeremy to a motel where he speaks to Rose who sired Katharine who in turn sired the Salvatore brothers. She tells them she was sired by Mary Porter and that she'll find out where Mary is. Meanwhile, Stefan fails at trying to get the location of the stake out of Alaric until Klaus comes by and snaps Alaric's neck. Back in the motel, Damon and Elena give in to their passion and kiss. Meanwhile, Stefan is forced to beat up Alaric to trigger his evil alter-ego, who, after some persuasion, tells Stefan that the last white oak stake is in the cave, where no vampire can get it. Meanwhile, Damon, Elena and Jeremy go to the house where Mary lives. Damon and Elena go inside and find Mary staked on the wall. Kol has murdered Mary before Damon and Elena talk to her. Kol then beats Damon up with a metal baseball bat to get even with him. Damon later asks Elena about the kiss, and she admits that Stefan thinks she loves him and was testing her feelings. Damon becomes upset and tells her he is not going to make this decision easy for her, that she must decide completely on her own. Caroline is thrilled when Tyler returns to town, but Tyler soon suspects that something has been going on between Caroline and Klaus, when he finds the picture Klaus drew for Caroline. Elsewhere, Matt has his hands full trying to keep Rebekah busy organizing the school's upcoming 1920s Decade Dance so Caroline can spend some romantic time with Tyler. Esther shows up at Klaus' house where she confronts Rebekah and dies after undergoing a strange fit. At the end of the episode it is revealed that Esther tricked Rebekah into giving her body to her and she wants alter-ego Alaric to work with her.
| 64 | 20 | "Do Not Go Gentle" | Joshua Butler | Michael Narducci | April 26, 2012 | 2J6020 | 2.22 |
Alaric finds an unexpected ally, Esther, to guide him on his dangerous new path of killing vampires, while Damon and Meredith try to figure out what their next move should be to bring the real Alaric back from his alter-ego form. At the school's 1920s Decade Dance, Bonnie asks Jamie to go with her, and, at Caroline's suggestion, Elena asks Stefan to be her date. Caroline is pleasantly surprised when Tyler shows up at the dance determined to sweep her off her feet, but Klaus does his best to come between them and tells her that he believes Caroline will eventually come to him, even if she is not ready at the moment to let go of her "small town boy [and her] small town life" because he knows that eventually "it won't be enough" for her. The dance takes a deadly turn when Damon and Stefan realize they need the help of Matt and Jeremy to protect Elena because the two Salvatore brothers are immobilized on one side of a boundary Esther created. They asked Bonnie to undo the spell that could prove devastating for everyone. Finally, Esther turns Alaric into an Original vampire to kill Klaus and other Originals. Esther also uses Alaric's ring to render the last White Oak stake indestructible so that it can be used multiple times on all the Originals. However, the real Alaric kills Esther and decides not to complete the transition. Stefan, Elena, Damon, Jeremy, Meredith, Bonnie, Caroline, Matt and Tyler mourn Alaric's last moments before he isolates himself to die. Elena finds comfort with Stefan, while Damon stays with Alaric until his last breath. Alaric seems to have died, but Esther compels Bonnie to give Alaric some blood to complete the transition to an Original.
| 65 | 21 | "Before Sunset" | Chris Grismer | Story by : Charlie Charbonneau & Daphne Miles; Teleplay by : Caroline Dries | May 3, 2012 | 2J6021 | 2.54 |
Klaus acts on his intentions to leave town with Elena, but finds resistance from a surprising new enemy, Alaric the new Original vampire hunter. Bonnie calls on Abby to help her with a difficult spell that will stop Alaric's heart, the same desiccation spell Abby used on Mikael. Abby warns Bonnie that this will make her subject to temptation she might not be able to resist. Alaric forces Elena to come to the school after he captures and tortures Caroline and tries to persuade her to kill Caroline, as Elena had previously expressed her interest in killing vampires. When Elena tries unsuccessfully to save Caroline and is held captive by Alaric, the Salvatore brothers and Klaus rush to save her. Klaus reveals that it is his bloodline to which the Salvatore brothers and Caroline are linked. As Caroline is escaping, Klaus grabs her and makes sure that Caroline gets home safely. A stunned Caroline agrees to let Klaus, Damon and Stefan save Elena, thanks Klaus, and leaves. Klaus goes to save Elena, taking on Alaric, but Alaric quickly turns the tables and is ready to stake him, but just as Alaric is ready to kill Klaus, Elena correctly assumes that she is Alaric's lifeline and that if she dies, so does he. Klaus escapes with Elena, intending to bleed her dry before he leaves town because he wants to kill Alaric. Tyler, Stefan, and Damon use the desiccation spell on Klaus, "killing" him without killing Tyler. Damon and Stefan have a surprisingly candid conversation about the future: if Elena chooses one brother, the other leaves town. Alaric outs both the Sheriff and the Mayor in front of the Council for failing to protect the town from vampires as both their children are vampires. Elena collapses at the end of the episode.
| 66 | 22 | "The Departed" | John Behring | Story by : Brett Matthews & Elisabeth R. Finch; Teleplay by : Julie Plec | May 10, 2012 | 2J6022 | 2.53 |
Jeremy takes Elena to the hospital where Meredith takes care of her. Elena dreams of simpler times when her parents, Grayson and Miranda, and Aunt Jenna were still alive and her biggest concern was her relationship with Matt. Stefan and Damon leave Mystic Falls together on a mission, but soon split up when Elena needs one of them. Elijah returns and asks for Klaus' body in return for luring Alaric away. Alaric convinces Jeremy and Matt to help him kill Klaus so Elena can live a happy life, but Jeremy tricks Alaric. Caroline and Tyler are forced to make a life-changing decision and flee from Mystic Falls at the urging of their parents. Stefan kisses Elena before going to deal with Alaric. Alaric surprises Damon at the storage locker where Klaus' body is stored. Alaric kills Klaus (who was revealed to have made Damon's, Stefan's, Caroline's, Abby's and Tyler's bloodline). Matt was taking Elena out of town and she decides to go back to say good-bye to Stefan, saying that he came into her life at the right moment, but maybe if she had met Damon first, it would have been different. Caroline says good-bye to Tyler as Rebekah and Elijah mourn Klaus. Bonnie made a secret deal to reincarnate Klaus in the body of Tyler so that her friends would not die, however no one else knows this, as they all believe that Klaus was lying about being the head of their bloodline. Elena and Matt get into a car crash (while this is happening Elena is having flashbacks to when she and her parents were dying in the car). It is then shown in a flash back that Damon and Elena met the night of the car crash involving Elena and her parents, where he tells her that she wants "a love that consumes you, you want passion, an adventure, and even a little danger." But after meeting her, Damon compelled her saying that "No one can know I'm in town yet." When Stefan comes to save her and Matt, she signals him to save Matt instead of her. Elena then drowns, which made Alaric go down with her. He then says goodbye to Jeremy in ghost form. At the end of the episode Dr. Fell reveals to Damon that Elena was not suffering from a concussion, but a bleeding in the brain and that she did what she had to do to save her, by giving her vampire blood. The episode ends with Elena waking up as a vampire.

== Production ==
On April 26, 2011, the CW officially renewed The Vampire Diaries for a third season. On May 19, 2011, with the reveal of the CW's 2011-12 schedule, it was announced the series would stay on Thursday's at 8:00 pm Eastern/7:00 pm Central as a lead-in to The Secret Circle which is also produced by Kevin Williamson. Kevin Williamson, Julie Plec, Leslie Morgenstein and Bob Levy are executive producers for the series.

The third season premiered on Thursday, September 15, 2011.

=== Casting ===
The series stars Nina Dobrev as Elena Gilbert and Katherine Pierce, Paul Wesley as Stefan Salvatore, Ian Somerhalder as Damon Salvatore, Steven R. McQueen as Jeremy Gilbert, Kat Graham as Bonnie Bennett, Candice Accola as Caroline Forbes, Zach Roerig as Matt Donovan, Michael Trevino as Tyler Lockwood, Matt Davis as Alaric Saltzman and Joseph Morgan as Klaus.

7th Heaven's David Gallagher was cast as werewolf Ray Sutton who has a run-in with Klaus in Tennessee. Australian actress, Claire Holt has been cast as Rebekah the sister of Klaus and Elijah, a beautiful vampire who had the pleasure of Stefan's company back in the early days when he was feasting on human blood. Sebastian Roché has also been cast as Mikael a vampire hunter, who is more specifically after his son Klaus. He feeds on vampires and is hunting Klaus. It is later revealed that he is the father of the Originals and Klaus's stepfather. When his plan to kill Klaus backfires, Mikael is killed by Klaus instead. Heroes star Jack Coleman was cast as Bill, a former resident of Mystic Falls and the father of resident vampire Caroline, who first believes his daughter has become a monster, but later accepts her.

Alice Evans joined the cast as the original witch Esther, Klaus' mother. She was first seen in a flashback in episode eight. Daniel Gillies will also return first appearing in a flashback during episode eight as Klaus' brother, Elijah. Persia White has been cast as Bonnie's mother, Abby Bennett. On November 10, 2011, it was announced that Paul Wesley's wife Torrey DeVitto was cast as Meredith Fell (based on Meredith Sulez from the source novel), a young doctor who is fascinated by Alaric, when she notices how quickly he recovers from an injury. She uses vampire blood to cure people and starts dating Alaric. On November 16, 2011, it was announced that Robert Ri'chard was cast as Jamie a new love interest for resident witch Bonnie. On November 22, 2011, it was announced that Daniel Newman was cast as Daniel Warren, appearing in one episode. Australian actor Nathaniel Buzolic has been cast to play Klaus and Elijah's brother Kol and English actor Caspar Zafer has been cast as their other brother Finn. On January 13, 2012, it was announced that Cassidy Freeman was cast as Sage. On March 31, 2012, Sara Canning was confirmed to return as Jenna Sommers in a flashback in the last episode of the season, "The Departed". On April 9, 2012, Jason MacDonald and Erin Beute were confirmed as Elena's parents, will appear in a flashback in the last episode of the season. Lauren Cohan re-appeared in the episode Heart of Darkness, as ghost Rose, to contact Jeremy and find Mary, who turned Rose into a vampire.

=== Storylines ===
Season three begins in the aftermath of Jenna's death and the ceremony which leads to the creation of Klaus being the first hybrid. This has heavily affected Alaric, Elena, and Jeremy. Stefan is on a ripper binge where he can not control his urges for human blood, and he continues to become a darker character. In trying to help Stefan, Elena and Damon spend time together and they begin to realize that they have feelings for each other. They both feel guilt over this and do not speak about it, but it is a silent truth between them.

Jeremy is still having trouble with his ghosts; they are trying to convey an important message to him. He and Bonnie are becoming more distant as his past ghosts distract him from his everyday life.

Klaus is intent on creating an army of hybrids (half-vampire, half-werewolf) that are sired to him. At the beginning of the season, Klaus enlists Stefan to help him but Stefan eventually leaves. Alaric becomes a vampire hunter and targets the Originals.

The season also focuses on how the Original family of vampires came to be vampires by their father, Michael Mikaelson, asking Esther to make them stronger than their neighbors who were werewolves. It also delves deeper into the physiology of the family specifically the siblings and shows the reason behind their motto "Always and Forever" and how bonds formed between some of the siblings.

== Reception ==
=== Critical response ===
Based on 10 reviews, the 3rd season currently holds a 90% on Rotten Tomatoes with an average rating of 8.7 out of 10. The site's critics consensus reads, "A bloody delight, The Vampire Diaries continues its winning run with its trademark twists, shocking deaths, and consistent character development."

=== Ratings ===
| No. | Title | Air date | 18–49 rating (Live + SD) | Viewers (millions) increase | Total 18-49 increase | Total viewers (millions) | Ref |
|---|---|---|---|---|---|---|---|
| 1 | "The Birthday" | September 15, 2011 | 1.5 | 1.1 | 2.0 | 3.98 | |
| 2 | "The Hybrid" | September 22, 2011 | 1.2 | 1.00 | 1.7 | 3.52 | |
| 3 | "The End of the Affair" | September 29, 2011 | 1.3 | 1.05 | 1.8 | 3.79 | |
| 4 | "Disturbing Behavior" | October 6, 2011 | 1.2 | 1.05 | 1.7 | 3.68 | |
| 5 | "The Reckoning" | October 13, 2011 | 1.4 | 1.4 | 1.2 | 3.76 | |
| 6 | "Smells Like Teen Spirit" | October 20, 2011 | 1.3 | 1.6 | 1.7 | 3.88 | |
| 7 | "Ghost World" | October 27, 2011 | 1.5 | 1.31 | 2.1 | 4.59 | |
| 8 | "Ordinary People" | November 3, 2011 | 1.6 | 1.12 | 2.2 | 4.63 | |
| 9 | "Homecoming" | November 10, 2011 | 1.4 | 2.0 | 1.8 | 4.78 | |
| 10 | "The New Deal" | January 5, 2012 | 1.5 | 0.88 | 1.9 | 4.20 | |
| 11 | "Our Town" | January 12, 2012 | 1.2 | 1.43 | 1.8 | 4.29 | |
| 12 | "The Ties That Bind" | January 19, 2012 | 1.2 | 1.13 | 1.7 | 3.84 | |
| 13 | "Bringing Out the Dead" | February 2, 2012 | 1.2 | 1.37 | 1.8 | 4.11 | |
| 14 | "Dangerous Liaisons" | February 9, 2012 | 1.3 | 1.17 | 1.8 | 4.25 | |
| 15 | "All My Children" | February 16, 2012 | 1.4 | 1.04 | 1.9 | 3.94 | |
| 16 | "1912" | March 15, 2012 | 1.2 | 1.32 | 1.8 | 3.96 | |
| 17 | "Break on Through" | March 22, 2012 | 1.3 | 1.03 | 1.8 | 3.72 | |
| 18 | "The Murder of One" | March 29, 2012 | 1.2 | 1.02 | 1.7 | 3.46 | |
| 19 | "Heart of Darkness" | April 19, 2012 | 1.0 | 1.32 | 1.6 | 3.53 | |
| 20 | "Do Not Go Gentle" | April 26, 2012 | 1.1 | 1.01 | 1.6 | 3.23 | |
| 21 | "Before Sunset" | May 3, 2012 | 1.1 | 0.88 | 1.7 | 3.42 | |
| 22 | "The Departed" | May 10, 2012 | 1.2 | 0.98 | 1.8 | 3.51 | |

== DVD and Blu-ray release ==
The Vampire Diaries - The Complete Third Season
| Set Details | | Special Features |
| 22 Episodes; 5 DVD discs or 4 Blu-ray discs Set; DVD: English (Dolby Digital 5.1); Blu-ray: English (DTS-HD Master Audio 5.1); Audio Commentaries | | The Vampire Diaries: Stefan's Descent into Darkness (Featurette); The Original Vampires: The Beginning (Featurette); Second Bite: Bloopers; Exclusive bonus features for Blu-ray Disc version: The Producer's Pages (The Writer's Pack, The Producer's Spells and Sound FX, Score and Suspense); Favorite Scenes - The Series' Most Heart-Stopping Moments; Digital copy of all episodes of season |
Release Dates
| Region 1 | Region 2 | Region 4 |
| September 11, 2012 | August 20, 2012 | October 3, 2012 |
