= Dangerous Liaisons (The Vampire Diaries) =

- The Vampire Diaries episode
- Episode no.: Season 3 Episode 14
- Directed by: Chris Grismer
- Written by: Caroline Dries
- Cinematography by: Dave Perkal
- Editing by: Tyler Cook
- Production code: 2J6014
- Original air date: February 9, 2012

Guest appearances
- Claire Holt as Rebekah Mikaelson; Daniel Gillies as Elijah Mikaelson; Alice Evans as Esther; Nathaniel Buzolic as Kol Mikaelson

Episode chronology
← Previous "Bringing Out the Dead"	Next → "All My Children"
- The Vampire Diaries season 3

"Dangerous Liaisons" is the fourteenth episode of the third season of the American supernatural teen drama television series The Vampire Diaries, and the 58th of the series. It aired on The CW on February 9, 2012. The episode was written by co-executive producer Caroline Dries and directed by Chris Grismer.

== Plot ==
Rebekah (Claire Holt) attacks Elena (Nina Dobrev) but Elijah (Daniel Gillies) stops her before she kills her. Esther (Alice Evans) organizes a ball as a celebration for her family's reunion and as Elena is in her house talking to Stefan and Damon she gets an invite from Esther. Rebekah invites Matt (Zach Roerig) while Klaus (Joseph Morgan) sends a dress to Caroline (Candice Accola) and invites her as his date.

Damon (Ian Somerhalder) and Stefan (Paul Wesley) do not agree with Elena going to the ball and she tells them that she will not go but she eventually does because she wants to know what Esther wants from her. Finn (Casper Zafer) introduces himself to Elena and tells her that his mother would like to see her alone. Damon does not want to let Elena out of his sight, so Elena asks Stefan's help. Stefan snaps Damon's neck and Elena meets Esther.

Esther explains to Elena why she is not dead even though Klaus killed her many years ago. She also tells Elena her plan and that the real reason she wanted all her children together was to link them as one so she will be able to kill them and "fix" the evil she created years ago. To be able to start the ritual, Esther needs Elena's blood. Elena agrees to help her since it is the only way to kill Klaus.

In the meantime, Rebekah asks for Kol's (Nathaniel Buzolic) help to hurt Matt so that she can get revenge on Elena for stabbing her, but spending time with Matt makes her change her mind while Klaus confesses to Caroline that he likes her and keeps flirting with her all night. He reveals his passion for drawing and painting but Caroline keeps asking him to free Tyler (Michael Trevino) from the sire bond. Klaus asks her to leave and when she gets home, she finds a drawing sent to her by Klaus.

The ball ends and Esther is now able to complete the spell with Finn's help. She links all her children together and Finn tells her that he is ready to die. Elena tells Stefan Esther's plan on their way home and he is glad that Klaus will be dead. Elena tries to make Stefan care again but Stefan says he does not want to care because if he does the only thing he feels is pain and he leaves.

Rebekah tries to talk to Matt the next day but he rejects her. Damon, who is also hurt with Elena's behavior, sees that Rebekah is hurt from Matt's rejection and the two of them end up at his bedroom having sex.

== Music ==
In "Dangerous Liaisons" one can hear the songs:

- "Up in Flames" by She Wants Revenge
- "Short Change Hero" by The Heavy
- "Give Me Love" by Ed Sheeran
- "Devotion" by Hurts
- "Wrap My Mind Around You" by Trent Dabbs

== Reception ==
=== Ratings ===
In its original American broadcast, "Dangerous Liaisons" was watched by 3.08 million; up by 0.34 from the previous episode.

=== Reviews ===
"Dangerous Liaisons" received positive reviews.

Dhalyn Warren from Fanbolt gave the episode an A rating saying that overall she loved the episode and it went by so fast. "This week’s episode of The Vampire Diaries featured a killer party! Literally. Beautiful gowns, dancing, not to mention a few snaps of the neck! The Original Family definitely knows how to throw a party, but we all know what happens when there’s an event in Mystic Falls. Dire consequences."

Carrie Raisler from The A.V. Club gave the episode a B+ rating saying that the episode is a "very fine" one and the Originals are the characters responsible for that. "It’s a bit hard to believe [The Originals], all of whom fit into the world of Mystic Falls so perfectly, only just arrived on the scene and are already capable of carrying the majority of an episode all by themselves. TVD doesn’t get enough credit for consistently creating characters that are interesting out of the gate and then using them wisely, therefore ingratiating them to the audience quickly."

Diana Steenbergen from IGN rated the episode with 9/10. "One thing The Vampire Diaries has made a point of emphasizing in the past is that Elena likes to make her own decisions, and this episode was another example of that. [...] The Season 3 version of Damon may be more in touch with his feelings, but he is still Damon and still has a tendency to act recklessly [...] he didn't take out his anger by compelling or killing some poor, innocent girl the way he had done in the past. For Damon, picking the fight with Kol and hooking up with Rebekah was actually progress."
