= The Departed (The Vampire Diaries) =

- The Vampire Diaries episode
- Episode no.: Season 3 Episode 22
- Directed by: John Behring
- Story by: Brett Matthews; Elisabeth R. Finch
- Teleplay by: Julie Plec
- Cinematography by: Dave Perkal
- Editing by: Nancy Forner; Tyler Cook
- Production code: 2J6022
- Original air date: May 10, 2012

Guest appearances
- Claire Holt as Rebekah Mikaelson; Daniel Gillies as Elijah Mikaelson; Marguerite MacIntyre as Liz Forbes; Torrey DeVitto as Meredith Fell; Sara Canning as Jenna Sommers

Episode chronology
← Previous "Before Sunset"	Next → "Growing Pains"
- The Vampire Diaries season 3

"The Departed" is the twenty-second and final episode of the third season of the American supernatural teen drama television series The Vampire Diaries, and the 66th of the series. It aired on The CW on May 10, 2012, and garnered 2.53 million viewers. The episode's teleplay was written by series co-developer Julie Plec based on a story by Brett Matthews and Elisabeth R. Finch, while John Behring served as director. During the episode, Elena remembers when life was simpler while the rest of her friends attempt to stay away from Alaric.

== Plot ==
In the third-season finale, Elena Gilbert (Nina Dobrev) recovers in the hospital from her fall in the previous episode. Jeremy brings her back home, where Caroline Forbes (Candice Accola), Bonnie Bennett (Kat Graham), Jeremy Gilbert (Steven R. McQueen), Matt Donovan (Zach Roerig) and Tyler Lockwood (Michael Trevino) take care of her. In the harsh reality of the present situation, Elena longs for simpler times when her parents, Grayson (Jason MacDonald) and Miranda Gilbert (Erin Beute), and aunt Jenna Sommers (Sara Canning) were still alive, and her biggest concern was her relationship with Matt. In a conversation with Matt, Elena tells him that Stefan was there at a time in her life when she had nothing, but that when she is with Damon, she feels a passion for him that consumes her.

As this is happening, Damon Salvatore (Ian Somerhalder) and Stefan Salvatore (Paul Wesley) transport a neutralized Klaus (Joseph Morgan) away from Mystic Falls. Jeremy calls them and tells them about Elena's injury and her being in the hospital. Since one of them has to continue on to dispose of Klaus, only Stefan can return to Mystic Falls. Alaric Saltzman (Matt Davis) tries to convince Jeremy to tell him the location of Klaus, believing that Jeremy will also want to get rid of all vampires to protect his sister. Jeremy instead leaks false information to Alaric from Damon. When Elijah Mikaelson (Daniel Gillies) comes back into town, he strikes a deal with Elena, Bonnie, and the Salvatores, promising that in exchange for Klaus, he will revive Klaus generations later. Damon and Bonnie go to retrieve Klaus, but Alaric ambushes Damon. Rebekah (Claire Holt) arrives and tries to save Klaus, but Alaric manages to stake the neutralized Klaus. Damon, Stefan, Caroline and Tyler immediately worry because Klaus is the originator of their bloodline. An hour later, however, they're still alive which confuses Elijah and Rebekah, as they were positive that Klaus originated their bloodline and were sure it wasn't Kol Mikaelson (Nathaniel Buzolic). Unbeknownst to them, Bonnie created a spell to transfer Klaus into Tyler's body, meaning Klaus is still alive. She did this to save her friends and her mother (Persia White) who also stems from the same bloodline.

Matt forces Elena to leave Mystic Falls with him to keep her away from the vampire attacks that have recently put her in harm's way. On the way, Elena realizes she loves Stefan and between her love for him and for Damon, she chooses Stefan, claiming that perhaps if she had met Damon first, things would be different (however, in a flashback it is revealed she did meet Damon first although he compelled her to forget the encounter). Rebekah, enraged and desolate, decides to kill Alaric by killing Elena and causes them to drive off a bridge. Alaric dies in Damon's arms after Elena drowns, but appears to Jeremy as a ghost to say goodbye. Damon realizes Alaric's death means Elena must have died and rushes to the hospital where Meredith Fell (Torrey DeVitto) reveals that when Elena was in the hospital earlier in the day, she had suffered from cerebral hemorrhaging so Meredith had given Elena vampire blood to heal and save her. The consequences of the vampire blood treatment and Elena's drowning are then revealed as Elena opens her eyes in the hospital, in transition to becoming a vampire.

== Development ==
The episode marks a pivotal point in the series; where Elena begins transition marks a change in the series' dynamic. The plot to turn Elena had been in the works since the series began, where executive producers Kevin Williamson and Julie Plec had signed on to the project and agreed that at some point, she would be turned. Initially, this plot was to be used by the end of the second season.

== Reception ==
The episode's initial airing attracted 2.53 million viewers. The episode received critical acclaim, with most reviewers attributing success to the final act. Diana Steenbergen of IGN praised the episode and the writers for clearing up a couple story lines and making all of them come to a head. She also praised Dobrev's performance in this episode, addressing her behaviour as another reason the final revelation from Meredith was more shocking and believable. Similarly, Mandi Bierly of Entertainment Weekly review praised the writer's skills in creating the more unexpected final twist.

Several reviewers also addressed the dynamic of the show may change now with the character of Elena being transitioned. Keshaunta Moton of Poptimal refers to the upcoming changes as "huge" and notes the change as something that'll affect her relationship with other characters. Other reviewers, like Matt Roush of SeattlePi and Ben Lee of Digital Spy, refer to the finale as a "game-changer" and one to set up a completely new storyline for the fourth season.
