= The Reckoning (The Vampire Diaries) =

- The Vampire Diaries episode
- Episode no.: Season 3 Episode 5
- Directed by: John Behring
- Written by: Michael Narducci
- Cinematography by: Dave Perkal
- Editing by: Lance Anderson
- Production code: 2J6005
- Original air date: October 13, 2011

Guest appearances
- Claire Holt as Rebekah Mikaelson; Malese Jow as Anna; Sebastian Roché as Mikael Mikaelson; Kayla Ewell as Vicki Donovan

Episode chronology
← Previous "Disturbing Behavior"	Next → "Smells Like Teen Spirit"
- The Vampire Diaries season 3

"The Reckoning" is the fifth episode of the third season of the American supernatural teen drama television series The Vampire Diaries, and the 49th of the series. It aired on The CW on October 13, 2011. The episode was written by co-producer Michael Narducci and directed by supervising producer John Behring.

== Plot ==
Elena (Nina Dobrev), Caroline (Candice Accola), Bonnie (Kat Graham), Tyler (Michael Trevino) and Matt (Zach Roerig) along with other senior students are at the school when Klaus (Joseph Morgan) arrives and gets Elena. He explains that because she is not dead, he cannot create the hybrid army he always wanted and now he wants Bonnie to fix this. Klaus feeds Tyler his blood and kills him, saying that if Bonnie does not find how to fix the mistake that was created by Elena staying alive, Tyler will wake up in transition but he will die.

Damon (Ian Somerhalder) is on the road with Katherine but pulls over and demands to know where they are going. Katherine reveals that Jeremy (Steven R. McQueen) is unconscious in the trunk of the car. She explains that her old friend, Pearl (Kelly Hu), knew a vampire hunter who knows how to kill Klaus. Pearl never told Katherine who the vampire hunter was but she is sure she told her daughter, Anna (Malese Jow). Damon reminds her that both of them are dead; she explains that Jeremy is the key to contact them since he can see and talk to Anna’s ghost.

Stefan (Paul Wesley) tries to save Elena by telling Klaus that she means nothing to him. Klaus compels Stefan to obey him and then asks him to kill the two students in front of Elena. Meanwhile, Rebekah (Claire Holt) is with Caroline and Tyler and is looking at the pictures on Caroline’s phone. In one of them, she sees that Elena is wearing her necklace and shows it to Klaus but Elena tells them that Katherine stole it. As a reaction to the news, Klaus gives Bonnie twenty minutes to find the solution, or Stefan will feed on Elena.

Bonnie and Matt try to contact Jeremy to help them with contacting the dead witches but as Katherine has Jeremy's phone, they do not get an answer. Matt has the idea that if he dies and comes back, he will be able to talk to Vicki and find out the answer Klaus needs. He jumps in the swimming pool and drowns; when Bonnie finds him, she starts CPR while Matt sees and talks to Vicki. When he comes back, he tells Bonnie that the doppelganger has to die in order for the transition to complete successfully. They do not want to tell Klaus but he overhears their conversation.

The time for Stefan runs out. Knowing he will not be able to resist Klaus’ compulsion, he asks Elena to run. Elena tries to convince him that he can resist it because he loves her but with no result, so she runs away and Stefan starts chasing her. Klaus finds Elena and takes her to Stefan. Klaus is impressed that Stefan did not kill her and compels Stefan to turn off his humanity as it is what holds him back.

Tyler wakes up and after few minutes begins to feel unwell. Klaus arrives with Elena’s blood, saying that as the Original Witch said that Elena has to die, then it is exactly the opposite that has to happen. He knows that the Original Witch hates him and she would never tell him the truth. He gives Tyler Elena’s blood to drink and Tyler completes his transition to hybrid successfully.

Meanwhile, Anna refuses to help and Damon, trying to make her talk, hits Jeremy. Anna reveals the name of the vampire hunter: Mikael (Sebastian Roché), who is also a vampire. She warns that they should not wake him because he will kill everyone. Damon sees a text from Bonnie about Klaus being in Mystic Falls and he goes back, leaving Jeremy with Katherine to find Mikael.

To be able to make more hybrids, Klaus takes more of Elena’s blood. Damon tells Klaus that he and Katherine found Mikael, have awakened him and that by now, he knows where Klaus is. Klaus runs away with Elena’s blood and Damon takes Elena home. Stefan also gets back home telling them that Klaus asked him to keep a watch on Elena till he comes back. The episode ends with Katherine and Jeremy finding Mikael chained in a tomb.

== Feature Music ==
In "The Reckoning" we can hear the songs:

- "10,000 Lovers" by Ida Maria
- "Please Ask for Help" by Telekinesis
- "Will Do" by TV on the Radio
- "Torch Song" by Shady Bard

== Reception ==
=== Ratings ===
In its original American broadcast, "The Reckoning" was watched by 2.89 million; up by 0.26 from the previous episode.

=== Reviews ===
"The Reckoning" received positive reviews.

Carrie Raisler from The A.V. Club gave the episode an A− rating saying that the episode was full of twists and surprises and the best episode of the season so far. "Character dynamics were shifted in ways likely to resonate for the rest of the season, if not beyond. [...] One great thing about The Vampire Diaries is its willingness to let characters truly evolve and transform, while still managing to maintain the core characteristics that defined them in the first place. If any other show suddenly made their romantic lead a psychotic killer, it might be worrisome. With this show, I’m simply happy to be taken along for the ride."

Diana Steenbergen of IGN rated the episode with 8.5/10 saying that it was a twisty-turny episode that "delivered some shocking developments, although it occasionally relied a little too heavily on characters making leaps in logic. The episode felt a bit disjointed at times, but it was so quick moving on so many levels that it is hard to complain about that too much."

Caroline Preece of Den of Geek gave a good review to the episode saying that season 3 exploded back into life, with one of its best-ever episodes."Counting the interesting and important things that happen in this episode would be a long job, but when wondering what's been resolved or tied up you might realise how much more could lie ahead. The Reckoning is not only an outstanding hour of television, but it could signal many more just like it in the weeks ahead."
