= All My Children (The Vampire Diaries) =

- The Vampire Diaries episode
- Episode no.: Season 3 Episode 15
- Directed by: Pascal Verschooris
- Written by: Evan Bleiweiss; Michael Narducci
- Cinematography by: Dave Perkal
- Editing by: Nathan Easterling
- Production code: 2J6015
- Original air date: February 16, 2012

Guest appearances
- Claire Holt as Rebekah Mikaelson; Torrey DeVitto as Meredith Fell; Daniel Gillies as Elijah Mikaelson; Nathaniel Buzolic as Kol Mikaelson; Alice Evans as Esther; Persia White as Abby Bennett Wilson

Episode chronology
← Previous "Dangerous Liaisons"	Next → "1912"
- The Vampire Diaries season 3

"All My Children" is the fifteenth episode of the third season of the American supernatural teen drama television series The Vampire Diaries, and the 59th of the series. It aired on The CW on February 16, 2012. The episode was written by Evan Bleiweiss and co-producer Michael Narducci, and directed by producer Pascal Verschooris.

== Plot ==
Elijah (Daniel Gillies) finds evidence that Esther (Alice Evans) was casting a spell during the ball and he believes that Elena (Nina Dobrev) lied to him. He kidnaps Elena who tells him that Esther wants to kill them all. Elijah takes Elena into the tunnels and asks Rebekah (Claire Holt) to watch her and kill her if Stefan (Paul Wesley) and Damon (Ian Somerhalder) do not manage to stop Esther in time.

Elijah tells Damon and Stefan to stop Esther from completing her plan otherwise Elena will die. In the meantime, Esther asks for Bonnie (Kat Graham) and Abby's (Persia White) help to complete the spell, Esther needs to channel power from all the dead witches of the Bennett bloodline. Once the spell is cast, the Original vampires will become humans again and Finn (Casper Zafer) is willing to sacrifice himself for his mother' cause. When Finn dies, all will die since they are linked as one.

Stefan and Damon try to kill Kol (Nathaniel Buzolic), thinking that since the Originals are linked, if they kill him then all the Originals will die. They stab him and everyone collapses except Klaus (Joseph Morgan) who is a hybrid and the dagger does not affect him. Klaus finds Alaric (Matt Davis), Stefan and Damon while they are carrying Kol and removes the dagger. While Rebekah is down, Elena gets an opportunity and runs away getting to the cave where vampires cannot get in and protects herself.

Damon and Stefan try to find another way to stop Esther and they decide that they have to break the Bennett bloodline so Esther will not be able to channel their power. They attack Bonnie and Abby and Damon turns Abby into a vampire just in time to stop Esther from completing her spell. Esther and Finn disappear, Rebekah lets Elena go and all the Original siblings, except Rebekah, decide to leave town leaving Klaus behind.

Stefan asks Damon why he turned Abby when he was the one supposed to do it and Damon says because he can see that Stefan is trying to get back to his caring self. When Damon asks him how long it has been since he last fed on human blood, Stefan admits that he has not fed on human blood since the day he tried to drive Elena off the bridge.

Elijah sends Elena a message apologizing for kidnapping her while Rebekah tells Klaus the old white oak tree has grown back and it can be used by someone to kill them. The episode ends with Alaric finding that Meredith (Torrey DeVitto) has vampire weapons, like the ones that were used to kill Brian and Bill. Meredith sees him and shoots him telling him that he was not supposed to see that.

== Music ==
In "All My Children" one can hear the songs:

- "Rubicon" by Ume
- "Guarded" by Kevin Daniel
- "Teardrops on My Pillow" by Dum Dum Girls
- "Fire Escape" by Civil Twilight
- "Poison & Wine" by The Civil Wars

== Reception ==
=== Ratings ===
In its original American broadcast, "All My Children" was watched by 2.90 million; down by 0.18 from the previous episode.

=== Reviews ===
"All My Children" received mixed reviews.

Carrie Raisler from The A.V. Club gave the episode a C+ rating saying that this episode was "all about moments, mostly because when you look beyond the moments, everything else kind of falls apart." Raisler continues: "Last week showed the tremendous potential of the Original family, showcasing the family members' entertaining dysfunction in all its glory and then immediately giving them a central conflict in their mother’s plan to kill them all. It was intriguing, smart, fun, and very well-executed. All of this great build-up ultimately just made tonight’s easy resolution and scattering of the Originals like leaves to the wind without any sort of resolution that much more disappointing."

Diana Steenbergen from IGN rated the episode with 8/10 saying that after last week's revelation of Esther's plan, she is now moving forward very quickly to put it into motion. "The main problem with Esther moving so quickly on her plan to kill the Originals was that there wasn't enough time for tension in this storyline to build. I wasn't at all surprised when the spell fizzled out."
