= The New Deal (The Vampire Diaries) =

- The Vampire Diaries episode
- Episode no.: Season 3 Episode 10
- Directed by: John Behring
- Written by: Michael Narducci
- Cinematography by: Dave Perkal
- Editing by: Sean Albertson
- Production code: 2J6010
- Original air date: January 5, 2012

Guest appearances
- Claire Holt as Rebekah Mikaelson; Torrey DeVitto as Meredith Fell

Episode chronology
| ← Previous "Homecoming" | Next → "Our Town" |
- The Vampire Diaries season 3

"The New Deal" is the tenth episode of the third season of the American supernatural teen drama television series The Vampire Diaries, and the 54th of the series. It aired on The CW on January 5, 2012. The episode was written by co-producer Michael Narducci and directed by supervising producer John Behring.

== Plot ==
Bonnie (Kat Graham) tells Elena (Nina Dobrev) that every night she has the same dream; four coffins and Klaus (Joseph Morgan) is in one of them. Later on, Bonnie goes to the house of the witches that she sees in her dream to check it out and she finds Stefan (Paul Wesley). Meanwhile, Klaus gets back to Mystic Falls looking for Rebekah (Claire Holt) and Stefan. He tells Elena and Damon (Ian Somerhalder) what Stefan did and demands to tell him where he is but they tell him that they have no idea where Stefan or Rebekah are.

Alaric (Matt Davis) worries about Jeremy (Steven R. McQueen) when he finds out that he got fired from the Grill a week ago. Along with Elena, they try to talk to him but he is not listening to them. Jeremy starts hanging out with Tyler (Michael Trevino) despite Elena and Alaric's attempts to convince him that Tyler is dangerous because he is sired to Klaus. When they ask Tyler about the siren bond he tells them that he is loyal to Klaus but he can still make his own decisions.

Klaus asks Damon once again to tell him where Stefan is. When Damon says he cannot find him, Klaus calls Jeremy and asks him to do what he told him to do. Jeremy takes off his ring and stands in the middle of the street while a car comes towards him in high speed. Alaric pushes him out of the way just in time and the car hits him instead. Elena sees that Klaus' hybrid, Tony (Zane Stephens), was driving the car and since Alaric wears his ring is going to be fine. When she asks Jeremy who was on the phone, Elena realizes that Klaus compelled Jeremy.

Stefan asks Bonnie's help to hide the coffins so Klaus will not find them and asks her not to tell anyone. When Elena tells her that Klaus tried to kill Jeremy because they do not tell him where Stefan is, Bonnie tells her about the house. Elena and Damon go to find him but Stefan refuses to give them the coffins back. Elena leaves and Damon stays back to deal with Stefan who tells him why he stopped him from killing Klaus and reveals him where the coffins are and why he took them.

Alaric gets back to life but he is not completely healed and Elena calls an ambulance. A hybrid comes and compels the paramedics to not take Alaric and tells Elena that if she lets him come in the house, he could heal Alaric with his blood. Jeremy comes, kills the hybrid and along with Elena take Alaric to the hospital.

Elena, not having other choice, decides to give Rebekah's body to Klaus in order to save Jeremy's life. Klaus accepts the new deal but before he leaves with his sister, Elena tells him that Rebekah knows that he was the one who killed their mother and not Mikael. Knowing that Rebekah knows, Klaus puts the dagger back in her heart so she will not wake up.

At the end of the episode, Elena asks Damon to compel Jeremy to leave town and never return to Mystic Falls. Before Damon leaves, he kisses Elena while Stefan tells Bonnie that he cannot open one of the coffins. Bonnie says it is sealed with magic and they need to open it to find the answer of how to kill Klaus.

== Music ==
In "The New Deal" one can hear the songs:

- "Holding On and Letting Go" by Ross Copperman
- "Come On Let's Do It OK!" by The Trigger Code
- "Teenage Blood" by Apex Manor
- "Shook Down" by Yuck

== Reception ==
=== Ratings ===
In its original American broadcast, "The New Deal" was watched by 3.32 million; up by 0.15 from the previous episode.

=== Reviews ===
"The New Deal" received positive reviews.

Carrie Raisler from The A.V. Club gave the episode a B+ rating saying that the episode was fantastic and "it calmed any fears the fall season finale instilled."

Diana Steenbergen from IGN rated the episode with 8.5/10 saying that the episode "didn't disappoint. It moved the main storyline forward in surprising directions and had all the trademark twists and turns we have come to expect."

Robin Franson Pruter of Forced Viewing rated the episode with 3/4 stating that despite the fact that the episode started poorly, there were enough good scenes at the end of it to lift it to a positive rating.
