= Ghost World =

Ghost World or Ghostworld may refer to:

== Art & literature ==
- Ghost World, a trilogy of novels by Susan Price published from 1987 to 1993
- Ghostworld (novel), a 1993 novel by Simon R. Green
- Ghost World (comics), a comics story by Daniel Clowes first published from 1993 to 1997

== Film, theatre, and television ==
- "Ghostworld", a season 6 episode of The Real Ghostbusters
- Ghost World, a 1993 stage play by James McLure
- Ghost World (film), a 2001 film by Terry Zwigoff, based on the graphic novel
- "Ghost World" (The Vampire Diaries), a 2011 episode of The Vampire Diaries

== Music ==
- Ghost World (album), a 2025 album by Alison Wonderland
- "Ghostworld", a 1986 song by Models from Models' Media
- "Ghost World," a 2000 song by Aimee Mann from Bachelor No. 2 (influenced by Clowes' comic book story)
- Ghost World, a 2020 EP by Lauren Aquilina

== See also ==
- or
- or
- Spirit world (disambiguation)
