= The End of the Affair (disambiguation) =

The End of the Affair is a 1951 novel by Graham Greene.

The End of the Affair may also refer to:

- The End of the Affair (1955 film), a film directed by Edward Dmytryk
- The End of the Affair (1999 film), a drama film directed by Neil Jordan
- The End of the Affair (opera), a 2004 chamber opera
- "The End of the Affair" (The Vampire Diaries), an episode of the television series The Vampire Diaries
