= The Birthday (The Vampire Diaries) =

- The Vampire Diaries episode
- Episode no.: Season 3 Episode 1
- Directed by: John Behring
- Written by: Kevin Williamson; Julie Plec
- Cinematography by: Michael Negrin; John Peters
- Editing by: Sean Albertson
- Production code: 2J6001
- Original air date: September 14, 2011

Guest appearances
- Dawn Olivieri as Andie Star; Malese Jow as Anna; David Gallagher as Ray Sutton; Cherilyn Wilson as Samara; Kayla Ewell as Vicki Donovan

Episode chronology
| ← Previous "As I Lay Dying" | Next → "The Hybrid" |
- The Vampire Diaries season 3

"The Birthday" is the first episode of the third season of the American supernatural teen drama television series The Vampire Diaries, and the 45th of the series. It aired on The CW on September 14, 2011. The episode was written by series developers Kevin Williamson and Julie Plec, and directed by supervising producer John Behring.

== Plot ==
Stefan (Paul Wesley) is now with Klaus (Joseph Morgan) after promising him that he will do whatever Klaus tells him to do as exchange for saving his brother. The two of them try to find werewolves and track down one of them, Ray (David Gallagher). When they get to his house, two women are there. Klaus forces them to tell him where Ray is and then orders Stefan to kill both of them.

Caroline (Candice Accola) organizes a birthday party for Elena (Nina Dobrev) despite Elena's wish not to have a party. Elena tries, with the help of Caroline's mother, to follow Klaus’ victims so she will find where Stefan is. Damon (Ian Somerhalder) also tries to track down where Stefan and Klaus are with the help of Alaric (Matt Davis) but they do not tell Elena about their progress.

Jeremy (Steven R. McQueen), since the moment Bonnie (Kat Graham) brought him back to life, keeps seeing the ghosts of Anna (Malese Jow) and Vicki (Kayla Ewell) but does not tell anyone about it. Later, at the birthday party, he tells Matt (Zach Roerig) that he sees things he should not see but does not clarify what. When the two of them head back home, Matt hears him calling Vicki's name and realizes what Jeremy was talking about earlier.

Caroline and Tyler (Michael Trevino) grew closer during the summer but they are not together, as Caroline declines Tyler's proposal to be together. Tyler arrives with a date to Elena's birthday party, something that makes Caroline jealous and she ends up kissing him. The two of them go to Tyler's place and after having sex, Caroline tries to sneak out. Tyler's mother, Carol (Susan Walters), who suspects that Caroline must be a vampire, catches her on her way out and when Caroline tries to get her bag she burns out from vervain. Carol shoots her with more vervain injections and Caroline collapses.

Damon and Alaric go to the werewolf's house after their last clues about where Stefan and Klaus might be, and find the two girls dead with their heads ripped off. Damon explains to Alaric that Stefan was the one who killed them as that is his signature and that is why he got his nickname, "The Ripper".

Meanwhile, Klaus and Stefan find Ray and they torture him to tell them where the rest of his pack is. When Ray finally does, Klaus feeds him his blood and kills him to turn him into a hybrid. In the meantime, Klaus finds out that Damon still follows them, trying to find Stefan. Stefan overhears, and tells Klaus that he will handle his brother. Stefan finds Andie (Dawn Olivieri) in the TV news studio and when Damon gets there, Stefan tells him to stop searching for him. To make it clear, he compels Andie to jump off the roof. Andie dies, Stefan returns to Klaus and Damon goes home where Elena waits for him. Elena finds out that Damon was hiding things from her about Stefan. When she asks for an explanation, Damon tells her that she should forget about Stefan and that the victims they were tracking all this time were not Klaus’ but Stefan's; this is why he did not want to tell her.

Stefan calls Elena, but when she picks up the phone, he does not speak. Elena realizes that is Stefan and tells him to hold on, that everything is going to be fine and that she loves him.

== Feature Music ==
In "The Birthday" we can hear the songs:

- "A Drop in the Ocean" by Ron Pope
- "What You Know" by Two Door Cinema Club
- "Make It Without You" by Andrew Belle
- "Are We There Yet?" by Ingrid Michaelson
- "Barton Hollow" by The Civil Wars
- "Hello" by Martin Solveig
- "You Make Me Feel..." by Cobra Starship
- "Starpusher" by Location Location
- "Hawk Eyes" by The Kicks
- "Anna Sun" by Walk the Moon

== Reception ==
=== Ratings ===
In its original American broadcast, "The Birthday" was watched by 3.10 million; slightly up by 0.24 from the previous episode.

=== Reviews ===
"The Birthday" received positive reviews.

Carrie Raisler from The A.V. Club gave the episode an A rating stating that "the season three premiere lived up to any and all expectations and even surpassed what I thought was possible for the next chapter in this crazy saga. “The Birthday” was a metaphorical grab bag of everything the show does well."

Diana Steenbergen of IGN rated the episode with 8.5/10 saying that the season is going to be sure "full of shocking twists and turns, although the season premiere largely focused on grounding the characters in their storylines."

Caroline Preece from Den of Geek gave a good review to the episode saying that the most exciting part "was the potential for Stefan the ripper and all that could entail. Viewers might be excited about showrunner's assurances of an Elena/Damon romance, but the suggestion of what the kinder, gentler brother could actually be capable of is more than a little intriguing."
