= Disturbing Behavior (The Vampire Diaries) =

- The Vampire Diaries episode
- Episode no.: Season 3 Episode 4
- Directed by: Wendey Stanzler
- Written by: Brian Young
- Cinematography by: Dave Perkal
- Editing by: Sean Albertson; Tyler Cook
- Production code: 2J6004
- Original air date: October 6, 2011

Guest appearances
- Marguerite MacIntyre as Liz Forbes; Claire Holt as Rebekah Mikaelson; Malese Jow as Anna; Jack Coleman as Bill Forbes

Episode chronology
← Previous "The End of the Affair"	Next → "The Reckoning"
- The Vampire Diaries season 3

"Disturbing Behavior" is the fourth episode of the third season of the American supernatural teen drama television series The Vampire Diaries, and the 48th of the series. It aired on The CW on October 6, 2011. The episode was written by executive story editor Brian Young and directed by Wendey Stanzler.

== Plot ==
Stefan (Paul Wesley) and Klaus (Joseph Morgan) take Rebekah (Claire Holt) for shopping and when Stefan gets out of the store, he sees Katherine (Nina Dobrev). When he asks her what she is doing there, Katherine tells him that she knows the necklace Klaus is looking for, it is the one that he gave to Elena. Stefan says that he will make sure Klaus will not find out about it.

Liz (Marguerite MacIntyre) tells Damon (Ian Somerhalder) about Bill (Jack Coleman) and what he did to Caroline (Candice Accola) and that she wants him to erase his memory. They get to the basement, and when Damon makes sure that Bill does not have any more vervain in his system, he compels him to forget everything about Caroline being a vampire.

Elena, Caroline and Bonnie (Kat Graham) are cooking for the Founder’s Party when Elena feels her necklace burning her. That is because Gloria (Charmin Lee) casts a spell trying to find out where the necklace is. When Bonnie tries to catch it, she feels the magic and she tries later to find out what is going on with it. She discovers that the necklace has its own magic while Gloria hides from Klaus what she felt when she was doing the spell and asks for more time.

Stefan goes back later alone to check what Gloria really saw and she confesses that she heard three girls talking about him. She explains that the reason she did not tell Klaus is because she wants the necklace for herself and asks Stefan where is it. Stefan denies to tell her and she uses her magic to paralyze him and then torture him. Stefan does not talk but Gloria manages to see Elena through his mind and she finds out that she is the doppelganger who was supposed to be dead and that is why Klaus cannot make hybrids. As soon as she finds out, Katherine appears and kills her.

Katherine asks Stefan what his plan is and why he stays with Klaus. He explains that in the ‘20s, Klaus and Rebekah were running from someone they feared and he wants to know who. Katherine wants to help him find out but Stefan says he is alone on this and leaves. He returns to Klaus and tries to make Rebekah tell him who is after them but Rebekah realizes that something is not right and tells Klaus. Klaus decides to bring Stefan back to Mystic Falls to see what he is hiding.

Jeremy (Steven R. McQueen) sees Anna (Malese Jow) who tells him that he should not help Vicki come back because every time Vicki talks to him, she feels something bad. Later on, Bonnie asks his help to find out more about the necklace but as they start reading the old books something sets them on fire. Jeremy decides to talk to Bonnie about his visions who gets upset for not telling her sooner.

At the Founder’s Party, Bill appears at the end of the council meeting and wants to take over the council. Damon’s compulsion seems like it did not work since Bill remembers everything. Damon tells that to Elena and Alaric informing them that he has to kill Bill. Both tell him not to do it but Damon breaks Alaric’s neck (after seeing him wearing his Gilbert ring) and leaves to kill Bill. Elena calls Caroline and tells her about it. Caroline fights with Damon and takes her father away to save him.

Katherine returns to Mystic Falls. Pretending to be Elena, she manages to take the necklace from Bonnie and then goes to Damon offering him a road trip. Damon accepts despite not knowing where they will go.

In the end, Klaus talks to Stefan about his suspicion that he was hiding something and he was determined to find out. Klaus proceeds to open the truck's garage to reveal that he had brought Stefan back to Mystic Falls.

== Feature Music ==
In "Disturbing Behavior" we can hear the songs:

- "Human" by Civil Twilight
- "Wanna Be Sure" by Aidan Hawken
- "Phenomena" by Yeah Yeah Yeahs
- "Floating (Time Isn't Working My Side)" by Portugal. The Man
- "Go Outside" by Cults
- "Ready 2 Go" by Martin Solveig

== Reception ==
=== Ratings ===
In its original American broadcast, "Disturbing Behavior" was watched by 2.63 million; down by 0.11 from the previous episode.

=== Reviews ===
"Disturbing Behavior" received positive reviews.

Carrie Raisler from The A.V. Club gave the episode a B+ rating. "The crazy whip-quick plotting The Vampire Diaries is known for was back in full force tonight. [...] The truly crazy thing is how, as the show has progressed, they’ve increasingly managed to weave so many genuine character moments throughout these intricate plots."

Diana Steenbergen from IGN rated the episode with 8/10. "[The show] picked up the pace again this week with an episode that went back to multiple-storylines and lots of twists. You have to admire a show that has this many characters and manages to make each compelling. "Disturbing Behavior" shifted quickly from plot to plot, and each one was as interesting as the others."
