= Our Town (The Vampire Diaries) =

- The Vampire Diaries episode
- Episode no.: Season 3 Episode 11
- Directed by: Wendey Stanzler
- Written by: Rebecca Sonnenshine
- Cinematography by: Dave Perkal
- Editing by: Lance Anderson
- Production code: 2J6011
- Original air date: January 12, 2012

Guest appearances
- Marguerite MacIntyre as Liz Forbes; Torrey DeVitto as Meredith Fell

Episode chronology
← Previous "The New Deal"	Next → "The Ties That Bind"
- The Vampire Diaries season 3

"Our Town" is the eleventh episode of the third season of the American supernatural teen drama television series The Vampire Diaries, and the 55th of the series. It aired on The CW on January 12, 2012. The episode was written by story editor Rebecca Sonnenshine and directed by Wendey Stanzler.

== Plot ==
Elena (Nina Dobrev) and Bonnie (Kat Graham) are preparing a party for Caroline’s (Candice Accola) birthday while Elena tells Bonnie that she asked Damon (Ian Somerhalder) to compel Jeremy (Steven R. McQueen) to leave town. Bonnie is surprised and does not agree with that but she eventually says goodbye to Jeremy without telling him that Damon compelled him.

Caroline does not want to have a birthday party since now she is a vampire and dead and stuck being seventeen. They all go to the old tomb to have a "funeral" instead so they will give Caroline the opportunity to say goodbye to her old life and be able to accept the new one to start over.

Stefan (Paul Wesley) asks Klaus (Joseph Morgan) to remove his hybrids from the town otherwise he will start killing them one by one. When Klaus threatens him that if he does that he will kill everyone starting from Damon, Stefan answers back that if he does that, he will never see his family again. To prove Klaus that he is not bluffing, Stefan kills one of the hybrids in front of him. When Stefan leaves, Klaus calls Tyler (Michael Trevino) asking him to bite Caroline but Tyler refuses to do it.

Later on, at the fundraiser, Klaus makes a deal with the town council to leave him and his hybrids alone and in return he will not harm anyone. Damon does not agree with that but there is nothing he can do. He stops Stefan from killing one more hybrid and warns him to back off since Klaus will never stop and as many hybrids as they kill, Klaus will make more.

Tyler goes to Caroline’s party and apologizes to her saying that he loves her and he wants them to be together. He kisses her but while kissing her he bites her against his will since is what Klaus told him to do. Matt (Zach Roerig) finds her and takes her home.

Stefan kidnaps Elena and drives her towards the bridge where her parents died. He calls Klaus telling him again to remove his hybrids from town otherwise he will kill Elena. When Klaus tells him that he would never do that, Stefan agrees but he says that he could turn her into a vampire and that way Klaus will still be unable to make more hybrids. Stefan forces Elena to drink his blood and continues driving in high speed towards the bridge with Klaus on the phone. Klaus realizes that Stefan is serious and agrees to remove the hybrids. Stefan stops in time, saving Elena’s life but she is terrified and cannot believe what Stefan was willing to do.

Klaus gets there a little bit later saying that Tyler told him what happened and agrees to save Caroline if Liz (Marguerite MacIntyre) supports him. Liz agrees and Klaus saves Caroline.

In the meantime, Alaric (Matt Davis) meets Doctor Meredith Fell (Torrey DeVitto) at the fundraiser, who treated his injuries at the hospital after the car accident. She tells him that she is a member of the council as she is a member of the founding families. Later on, he sees her fighting with a guy named Brian (David Colin Smith) and defends her. Brian tells him to be careful with her because she has a "psycho case".

At the end of the episode, Brian is found murdered in the woods with a stake in his heart even though he is not a vampire.

== Music ==
In "Our Town" one can hear the songs:

- "Between" by Courrier
- "Keep Running" by Gemma Hayes
- "Goodbye Horses" by The Airborne Toxic Event
- "False Alarm" by Trent Dabbs
- "Up in Flames" by Coldplay
- "You Are" by The Daylights
- "Punching in a Dream" by The Naked and Famous

== Reception ==
=== Ratings ===
In its original American broadcast, "Our Town" was watched by 2.86 million; down by 0.46 from the previous episode.

=== Reviews ===
"Our Town" received positive reviews.

Carrie Raisler from The A.V. Club awarded the episode with a B+. "The Vampire Diaries has done a really meticulous job over the past few seasons developing a core of strong characters. [...] And while I still have concerns about what seems like the ultimate futility of Klaus vs. Stefan, "Our Town" was so stuffed with wonderful character moments that it allowed me to turn off the "what if" part of my brain and simply enjoy these people."

Diana Steenbergen of IGN rated the episode with 8/10 stating that the episode was not light in action "...there was a decapitation, a stabbing and a ripped out heart – and those were just Klaus's hybrid casualties. [...] [the episode] was slightly disjointed with a few unrelated storylines going on, but thoroughly entertaining nonetheless."
