= The Ties That Bind (The Vampire Diaries) =

- The Vampire Diaries episode
- Episode no.: Season 3 Episode 12
- Directed by: John Dahl
- Written by: Brian Young
- Cinematography by: Dave Perkal
- Editing by: Nathan Easterling
- Production code: 2J6012
- Original air date: January 19, 2012

Guest appearances
- Jack Coleman as Bill Forbes; Torrey DeVitto as Meredith Fell; Robert Ri'chard as Jamie; Persia White as Abby Bennett Wilson; Daniel Gillies as Elijah Mikaelson

Episode chronology
| ← Previous "Our Town" | Next → "Bringing Out the Dead" |
- The Vampire Diaries season 3

"The Ties That Bind" is the twelfth episode of the third season of the American supernatural teen drama television series The Vampire Diaries, and the 56th of the series. It aired on The CW on January 19, 2012. The episode was written by executive story editor Brian Young and directed by John Dahl.

== Plot ==
Bonnie (Kat Graham) has a new dream where she sees herself ready to open the fourth coffin of Klaus’ family but Klaus (Joseph Morgan) stops her the last moment and locks her inside of it. A woman comes and opens it and Bonnie recognizes her mother, Abby (Persia White). She talks to Elena (Nina Dobrev) about it and tells her that the witches are trying to send her a message and that her mother can help them open the coffin. Bonnie and Elena start searching for Abby and when they find her, they drive at her place to meet her. Stefan (Paul Wesley) calls Elena asking her if they found Abby but Elena lies to him so he will not follow them. Stefan knows that Elena is lying and gets on his way to Abby’s house as well. In the meantime, a hybrid appears at Abby’s house.

Bonnie and Elena knock the door but no one answers until Jamie (Robert Ri'chard) appears and lets them in. He explains that he is the step son of Abby and when Abby gets home, Elena leaves to let Bonnie alone with her mother. Bonnie asks her help but Abby, after she used all of it to entomb Mikael few years ago, does not have her magic anymore. Outside the house, Elena runs into Stefan and they fight because Elena lied. Jamie- compelled by Klaus' hybrid- shoots Stefan with wooden bullets and ties up Elena. Bonnie hears the gunshot and tries to get out to check what happened but Abby drugs her and gets her into her car.

Elena manages to untie herself, knock Jamie down and helps Stefan remove the wooden pieces from his chest. She also tells him that she kissed Damon (Ian Somerhalder) while Abby takes Bonnie to the hybrid. Bonnie does not want to say where the coffins are but Abby convinces her to do it to save her life while at the same time she writes her a message telling her to warn her friends about it. Later on, Abby tells Bonnie that she is willing to help her if she gets her magic back and Bonnie is the only one who can help her with that.

Back in Mystic Falls, Klaus gets into the witch house where he finds Damon. He manages to make the witches reveal the coffins to him but the fourth one is missing. Damon tells Klaus that he is the one who took it and witches do not know where it is.

In the meantime, Tyler (Michael Trevino) apologizes once again to Caroline, this time for biting her, and he tells her that he called her father, Bill (Jack Coleman), to help him break the sire bond to Klaus. To do that, Bill tells him that he has to turn into a wolf until he manages to make the transition painless. That way, he will not feel like he owes Klaus and he will not be sired to him anymore.

Alaric (Matt Davis) starts dating Meredith (Torrey DeVitto). Damon, who believes that she might be the one who killed Brian, goes to the hospital to warn her but she injects him with vervain and takes his blood. When Alaric finds out, he asks her for explanations and she reveals to him that when she cannot do anything as a doctor, she uses vampire blood to help her patients.

The episode ends with Stefan coming back home and being mad at Damon for kissing Elena and for letting Klaus take the coffins. Damon says that he managed to hide the fourth one and also reveals that he took the dagger out of the chest of one of the siblings. Back at Klaus’ place, Elijah (Daniel Gillies) wakes up and Klaus is surprised to see him.

== Music ==
In "The Ties That Bind" one can hear the songs:

- "Money Saves" by Delta Spirit
- "Lonely Boy" by The Black Keys
- "Code Red" by The Boxer Rebellion
- "Rewind" by Diane Birch

== Reception ==
=== Ratings ===
In its original American broadcast, "The Ties That Bind" was watched by 2.71 million; down by 0.15 from the previous episode.

=== Reviews ===
"The Ties That Bind" received positive reviews.

Carrie Raisler from The A.V. Club gave the episode a B rating saying that the episode returned to the more typical twists and turns of the show. "If last week was more about the evolution of character with a little plot momentum thrown in, tonight was just the opposite. Ticking off plot boxes was more the focus [...] The reason these plot grinding episodes don’t feel like complete drags is they are all cleverly rooted in character motivations, which keeps the entire affair from careening off into the deep end of the plot churning pool."

Diana Steenbergen of IGN rated the episode with 8/10 pointing out that "...unfortunately, a lot of Damon's coolest stuff this week happened off screen [...] Finding out that Damon had decided to free Elijah was the best surprise of the night."

Robin Franson Pruter ofForced Viewing rated the episode with 3/4 saying that it was a solid episode. "This episode isn’t extraordinary. Nothing big happens in it. One test of a TV series is how well its ordinary episodes, the ones without those major plot twists that get everyone talking, stand up to repeat viewing. "The Ties That Bind" does well. [...] [The episode] might not be full of memorable events, but it holds up solidly as a middle of the season episode. It illustrates that The Vampire Diaries, and good television in general, is not just about plot."

Caroline Preece of Den of Geek gave a good review to the episode even though she pointed out that after last week's high, it was probably inevitable that the latest episode would be a little bit of a disappointment. "...the real talking point is Elijah's surprise return. He couldn't be more welcome, and his presence should make for a cracking episode when it returns."
