= Too Much Romance... It's Time for Stuffed Peppers =

2004 film

- Directed by: Lina Wertmüller
- Written by: Lina Wertmüller; Elvio Porta; Umberto Marino
- Starring: Sophia Loren; F. Murray Abraham
- Cinematography: Giuseppe Lanci
- Music by: Lilli Greco; Lucio Gregoretti
- Release date: 2004
- Country: Italy
- Language: Italian

Too Much Romance... It's Time for Stuffed Peppers (Italian: Peperoni ripieni e pesci in faccia) is a 2004 Italian comedy-drama film written and directed by Lina Wertmüller.

== Plot ==
Maria and Jeffrey are a married couple in their seventies. Their marriage is in crisis. However, Maria tries to get the family together in order to celebrate grandmother Assunta's birthday.

== Cast ==
- Sophia Loren as Maria
- F. Murray Abraham as Jeffrey
- Casper Zafer as Francesco
- Carolina Rosi as Miriam
- Silvia Abascal as Nelly
- Elio Pandolfi as Melino
- Angela Pagano as Assunta

== Production ==
The film was shot in Sorrento Peninsula. It had a troubled production, with the original producer Adriano Ariè dying during the shootings.

== Release ==
The film premiered at the 2004 Capri Hollywood International Film Festival. It had a limited theatrical release in June 2006.

== See also ==
- List of Italian films of 2004
