= The Hybrid (The Vampire Diaries) =

- The Vampire Diaries episode
- Episode no.: Season 3 Episode 2
- Directed by: Joshua Butler
- Written by: Al Septien; Turi Meyer
- Cinematography by: Dave Perkal
- Editing by: Joshua Butler
- Production code: 2J6002
- Original air date: September 22, 2011

Guest appearances
- Malese Jow as Anna; David Gallagher as Ray Sutton; Jack Coleman as Bill Forbes; Kayla Ewell as Vicki Donovan

Episode chronology
← Previous "The Birthday"	Next → "The End of the Affair"
- The Vampire Diaries season 3

"The Hybrid" is the second episode of the third season of the American supernatural teen drama television series The Vampire Diaries, and the 46th of the series. It aired on The CW on September 22, 2011. The episode was written by co-executive producers Al Septien and Turi Meyer, and directed by Joshua Butler.

== Plot ==
Elena (Nina Dobrev) asks Damon (Ian Somerhalder) what he knows about Stefan (Paul Wesley) but Damon tells her that Stefan is gone. Elena tries to convince him that since Stefan called her is a sign that he is not gone. When Damon refuses to help her, she goes to Alaric (Matt Davis) and she finds out what Stefan and Klaus (Joseph Morgan) are doing; tracking werewolves.

Carol (Susan Walters) puts vervain into Tyler's (Michael Trevino) coffee to test if he is a vampire and she is relieved when she sees that it does not affect him. She then calls Bill (Jack Coleman) for help while Tyler meets Elena to help her gather information about werewolves. Tyler shows her a location in Tennessee where werewolves might be and Elena asks Alaric to go with her at the Smokey Mountains otherwise she will go alone leaving him no choice. The two of them start their trip and while being on the road, Damon appears since Alaric called him and told him about Elena's plan.

Stefan and Klaus are still at Tennessee reaching at Ray's pack at the Smokey Mountains with Ray (David Gallagher) still being dead. Klaus introduces himself to the pack and explains what he wants from them. When Ray wakes up, he makes him complete his transformation and then Klaus makes the rest of the werewolves hybrids as well. After the transformation, something is not right and all the new hybrids eventually die with Klaus not understanding what went wrong. In the meantime, Ray runs away and Stefan goes to find him but Ray bites him and runs away again.

Elena, Alaric and Damon run into Ray and Ray attacks Damon. The three of them manage to knock him down and tie him up on the tree to protect themselves. Ray starts to transform sooner than what they thought and they start running to get out of the mountains the sooner as possible. Ray (as wolf) gets to them and Damon makes him chase him to keep Elena and Alaric safe. The two start fighting when Stefan arrives and kills Ray. Stefan asks Damon again to stop searching for him, take Elena home and make her forget about him.

Matt (Zach Roerig) and Tyler talk while Tyler drinks from the coffee Matt brought him. He feels the same weird taste he felt in the morning and Matt tells him that it is the taste of vervain. Tyler realizes that his mother was testing him and he asks her why. When he realizes that she knows about Caroline (Candice Accola) but not about him being a werewolf, he takes her to the Lockwood old property to see him while he transforms into a wolf. When Tyler gets back to his human form, Carol promises him that she will make sure nothing will happen to Caroline. She calls Bill to tell him not to hurt Caroline but he disagrees.

Jeremy (Steven R. McQueen) tells Matt that he saw Vicki (Kayla Ewell) again asking him to help her. He convinces Matt to help him contact her to find out what she needs. When Vicki appears again, she tells Jeremy that she can come back but she needs his help to do it. Right after, Anna (Malese Jow) appears to tell Jeremy not to bring Vicki back.

The episode ends with Damon visiting Elena to tell her that he was wrong about Stefan and that he will help her bring him back and Caroline waking up tied up in a basement. She calls for help and when Bill appears it is revealed that he is her father.

== Feature Music ==
In "The Hybrid" we can hear the songs:

- "Echo" by Jason Walker
- "Still New" by Smith Westerns
- "Got it All" by Portugal. The Man
- "Parade" by Delta Spirit
- "A Heavy Abacus" by The Joy Formidable

== Reception ==
=== Ratings ===
In its original American broadcast, "The Hybrid" was watched by 2.52 million; down by 0.58 from the previous episode.

=== Reviews ===
"The Hybrid" received positive reviews.

Carrie Raisler from The A.V. Club gave the episode a B+ rating saying that the episode "took this new maturity [that existed in the premiere episode] and used it to tell stories in a very familiar Vampire Diaries fashion, with excellent results. Season three is off to quite the start."

Diana Steenbergen from IGN rated the episode with 7.5/10 saying that with the second episode of the season, the show got a little more settled into their storylines.
