= Smells Like Teen Spirit (The Vampire Diaries) =

- The Vampire Diaries episode
- Episode no.: Season 3 Episode 6
- Directed by: Rob Hardy
- Written by: Julie Plec; Caroline Dries
- Cinematography by: Dave Perkal
- Editing by: Nathan Easterling
- Production code: 2J6006
- Original air date: October 20, 2011

Guest appearances
- Claire Holt as Rebekah Mikaelson; Malese Jow as Anna; Sebastian Roché as Mikael Mikaelson; Kayla Ewell as Vicki Donovan; Taylor Kinney as Mason Lockwood

Episode chronology
← Previous "The Reckoning"	Next → "Ghost World"
- The Vampire Diaries season 3

"Smells Like Teen Spirit" is the sixth episode of the third season of the American supernatural teen drama television series The Vampire Diaries, and the 50th of the series. It aired on The CW on October 20, 2011. The episode was written by series co-developer Julie Plec and co-executive producer Caroline Dries, and directed by Rob Hardy.

== Plot ==
Elena (Nina Dobrev) starts training with Alaric (Matt Davis) to be able to protect herself from vampires, while Rebekah (Claire Holt) moves in with Stefan Salvatore (Paul Wesley) and Damon (Ian Somerhalder) as Klaus (Joseph Morgan) left the town and left her behind.

Damon, Elena, Caroline (Candice Accola) and Alaric try to find a way to capture Stefan, and Tyler (Michael Trevino) joins them. When he hears what they are planning to do he does not agree as it is not in Klaus’ interest. Damon realizes that Tyler is sired to Klaus and he knocks him down so he will not destroy their plan. Caroline takes Tyler home while the rest continue with their plan.

Matt (Zach Roerig) keeps seeing Vicki (Kayla Ewell) who tries to convince him to do a spell ritual to bring her back. Jeremy (Steven R. McQueen) sees Matt talking alone and he realizes that he still sees Vicki. Anna (Malese Jow) tells Jeremy that Matt should not listen to Vicki and not bring her back because something bad will happen. Jeremy informs Bonnie (Kat Graham) about it and Bonnie tries to find Matt before he tries to do the ritual.

Meanwhile, Matt completes the ritual while Vicki guides him on what to do. They are both happy that the ritual has worked, but Vicki reveals that she had a deal with the witch from the other side to kill Elena on her return, as Elena is the key for Klaus to create more hybrids. Matt tries to stop Vicki but without success, so he calls Bonnie to tell her what he did. Bonnie finds him and they try to reverse the spell so Vicki can go back to the other side.

At the bonfire party, Elena pretends to be drunk to fool Stefan while Damon keeps Rebekah occupied. Elena manages to lead Stefan away from the others and Alaric shoots him with vervain. They put him in the car and try to leave, but Vicki sets the car on fire with Elena and Stefan trapped inside. Alaric manages to get Elena out, then Elena helps Stefan get out before the car explodes. Bonnie manages to send Vicki back before she does anything else.

Meanwhile, Katherine tries to wake Mikael (Sebastian Roché). She manages to do it and she asks him if he really knows how to kill Klaus. Mikael says that he does, that he will kill Klaus and asks Katherine to unchain him. When she does, Mikael tells her that he does not feed on human blood; when she asks what he feeds on, he grabs her and begins feeding on her.

The episode ends with Jeremy and Anna realizing that they now can feel each other's touch, while Mason Lockwood appears at the Salvatore house and hits Damon.

== Featured songs ==
In this episode, the following songs are used:

- "Take Your Time" by Cary Brothers
- "Satellite" by The Kills
- "Rave On" by Cults
- "Brick by Brick" by Arctic Monkeys
- "My Body" by Young the Giant
- "Black Iron Lung" by The Gods Of Macho
- "This Too Shall Pass" by OK Go

== Reception ==
=== Ratings ===
In its original American broadcast, "Smells Like Teen Spirit" was watched by 3.03 million; up by 0.14 from the previous episode.

=== Reviews ===
"Smells Like Teen Spirit" received mixed reviews.

Carrie Raisler from The A.V. Club gave the episode an A− rating. "At a certain point, you’d think The Vampire Diaries would stop being able to pull off so many surprises. [...] Yet somehow, they all work. If you ever think you know what’s coming next, just accept it: You don’t. This is a very, very good thing."

Diana Steenbergen of IGN rated the episode an 8/10, saying that it had a lot of action. "Even though some of the storylines felt like they took a step forward only to take a step backward again, it was fun to watch all the back and forth. And there was one heck of a surprise return at the end."

Caroline Preece from Den of Geek gave a mixed review to the episode saying that the ghosts took the center stage this week. "After last week's standout episode pushed Vampire Diaries forward a few thousand steps, this week it's back to school, keeping with the nostalgic teen drama of the season, but losing some of the momentum that made last week so much fun."
