= Homecoming (The Vampire Diaries) =

- The Vampire Diaries episode
- Episode no.: Season 3 Episode 9
- Directed by: Joshua Butler
- Written by: Evan Bleiweiss
- Cinematography by: Dave Perkal
- Editing by: Nathan Easterling
- Production code: 2J6009
- Original air date: November 10, 2011

Guest appearances
- Claire Holt as Rebekah Mikaelson; Sebastian Roché as Mikael Mikaelson

Episode chronology
← Previous "Ordinary People"	Next → "The New Deal"
- The Vampire Diaries season 3

"Homecoming" is the ninth episode of the third season of the American supernatural teen drama television series The Vampire Diaries, and the 53rd of the series. It aired on The CW on November 10, 2011. The episode was written by Evan Bleiweiss and directed by Joshua Butler.

== Plot ==
Stefan (Paul Wesley) calls Klaus (Joseph Morgan) to inform him that Mikael (Sebastian Roché) is dead. Klaus is not sure if he can believe him so he asks to talk to Rebekah (Claire Holt) who confirms what Stefan has told him. When Klaus hangs up the phone, it is revealed that Elena (Nina Dobrev) stabbed Mikael with the dagger as part of their plan to make Klaus come back to Mystic Falls and as soon as they are sure Klaus is coming, Elena removes the dagger so Mikael will wake up.

Caroline (Candice Accola) organizes the "Homecoming Party" and it is where they plan to kill Klaus when he comes back. Elena, Stefan and Damon (Ian Somerhalder) work with Mikael and Damon wants to make sure that no one will interfere to ruin their plan. Damon lets Mikael bite Stefan so he will be unconscious while Elena stabs Rebekah with the dagger so they will be sure that none of them will tell Klaus what they are planning.

The gym that the party was going to take place is flooded, and the party moves to Tyler's (Michael Trevino) home. It is revealed later that Klaus wanted the party to happen there as a celebration of his father's death and Tyler made sure that it would happen. Tyler does not know about the plan but as soon as Klaus tells him that if anyone tries to harm him, his hybrids will kill everyone. Tyler, being sure that Damon and Elena are planning something, injects Caroline with vervain and asks Matt (Zach Roerig) to take her home so she will be safe.

Elena and Damon arrive at the party and make sure that everything goes according to plan. Mikael, since Damon is the only one of the two who can enter the house, gives the stake to him so he can stake Klaus. Klaus gets a message that someone named Mikael wants to talk to him and they meet at the door, but Klaus does not exit the house. Mikael, to make him come out, takes Elena as a hostage and tells Klaus that he will kill her if he will not come out and fight him as a man instead of having his hybrids do his job.

Klaus calls Mikael‘s bluff but Mikael stabs Elena and she collapses. Right at that moment, Damon comes from behind and tries to stab Klaus but Stefan appears and stops him. Elena, who is revealed to be Katherine, gets up and throws wolfsbane to the hybrids to stop them from attacking Damon. Klaus takes the opportunity to grab the stake and stakes Mikael, killing him. Damon is furious with Stefan for not letting him kill Klaus and when he asks why, Klaus tells him that Stefan did it to earn his freedom. Klaus releases Stefan from his compulsion and Stefan is free to go.

Back at home, Damon is furious at how they did not manage to kill Klaus after planning everything accurately. Katherine calls to say goodbye and when they hang up, it is revealed that Stefan is with her and that she was the one who woke him up and helped him get to the party. Klaus told her, thinking that she was Elena, that if they kill him his hybrids will kill Damon anyway and that is why Stefan did not let Damon kill Klaus, to save him.

The episode ends with Klaus trying to reach Rebekah to tell her that Mikael is dead and it is time for a family reunion but Rebekah is not answering. Stefan calls him to tell him that now that he is free, he will get revenge on him for taking everything away from him. Stefan took all the coffins that contain Klaus’ siblings and when Klaus threatens him, Stefan tells him that if he kills everyone he loves, he will never see his siblings again.

== Music ==
In "Homecoming" one can hear the songs:

- "Don't Stop" by Only Children
- "Free Like You Make Me" by Cary Brothers
- "You Wanna Freak Out" by My Morning Jacket
- "First Light" by My Morning Jacket

== Reception ==
=== Ratings ===
In its original American broadcast, "Homecoming" was watched by 3.17 million; down by 0.34 from the previous episode.

=== Reviews ===
"Homecoming" received mixed reviews.

Diana Steenbergen from IGN rated the episode with 9/10 saying that the episode was full of the show trademark's twists; betrayals and double crosses. "The Vampire Diaries tends to be so quick moving that you really need to be paying attention to make sure you catch everything, and the mid-season finale "Homecoming" was no different."

Robin Franson Pruter from Forced Viewing rated the episode with 2/4 saying that the episode suffered from a curious flatness and that it was something we have seen before. "[The episode] takes place during a big party at the Lockwood mansion, during which various schemes play out. Some are thwarted, revealing other, trickier schemes. It's all reminiscent of Masquerade from Season 2. I didn't get the sense that the episode was breaking any new ground."

Carrie Raisler of The A.V. Club gave the episode a B− rating saying that even though "the episode had all the elements of a classic episode—scheming, plotting, double crossing, twists, lies, and, of course, a party—his time, those many parts just didn't come together to create a satisfying whole."
