= Tirant lo Blanc (film) =

- Theatrical release poster
- Directed by: Vicente Aranda
- Screenplay by: Vicente Aranda
- Based on: Tirant lo Blanch by Joanot Martorell
- Produced by: Enrique Viciano
- Starring: Casper Zafer; Esther Nubiola; Leonor Watling; Victoria Abril
- Cinematography: José Luis Alcaine
- Edited by: Teresa Font
- Music by: José Nieto
- Production companies: Carolina Films; DeAPlaneta; Future Films; Talent Films
- Distributed by: Arclight Films
- Release date: 7 April 2006
- Running time: 127 minutes
- Countries: Spain; United Kingdom
- Language: English
- Budget: €15 million
- Box office: €1,5 million

Tirant lo Blanc (also known as The Maidens' Conspiracy) is a 2006 historical adventure film directed by Vicente Aranda and starring Casper Zafer, Esther Nubiola, Leonor Watling and Victoria Abril. The script was written by Aranda based on Tirant lo Blanch, a Catalan language chivalry romance dating to 1490, written by Joanot Martorell. It presents a highly fictionalized alternate history narrative of the events leading to the Fall of Constantinople.

== Plot ==
In 1401, Tirant lo Blanc, a famous knight, arrives with his small but battle-hardened troops of Almogavars, to the port of Constantinople. The emperor's only son has recently been killed by the Turks and the Byzantine emperor is too old to lead his army in battle. Constantinople is under threat of an Ottoman invasion and therefore it is in desperate need of a skillful military leader. Upon arrival, Tirant is received by the emperor who makes him commander in chief of the Imperial army.

After he is presented to the empress, Tirant catches a glimpse of the breasts of the emperor's only surviving child, nosebleed-prone daughter Carmesina. A fanciful teenager who has just turned nubile, the beautiful Carmesina is also quickly smitten by the brave and handsome Tirant. Carmesina confides her love for Tirant to her guardian Ines, nicknamed the 'Placid Widow', whose late husband was an ally of the anti-pope. The Placid Widow immediately puts down Carmensina's romantic dreams. As brave and skilful military leader as Tirant might be, he is neither of royal blood nor has a fortune of his own to aspire to marry the heiress of the empire. Carmesina's friends and confidantes, her maidens: Pleasure-of-My-Life and Estefania, think otherwise. Scared of a possible Ottoman invasion, Pleasure-of-My-Life, the daughter of the court's poet, encourages Carmesina's interest in Tirant as she is to inherit the throne and he is going to defend it. Estefania, another lady-in-waiting, supports Tirant's affair with Carmesina because she has fallen in love with Tirant's right-hand man Diafebus. Meanwhile, the Empress contemplates that Constantinople stands no chance against an Ottoman onslaught and sees her daughter's marriage to the Sultan as the sole way to accommodate him.

In his first battle against the troops of Ottoman sultan Mehmed II, Tirant scores a triumph, but he returns to the Byzantine court with a wound in one shoulder and with the Ottoman threat still looming over Constantinople. Pleasure-of-My-Life tries to consolidate Tirant's romance with the princess awakening Carmesina's desire for him. She tells the princess about a sensual dream in which Carmesina was involved with Tirant while Estefania was having sex with Diafebus. Meanwhile, the Placid Widow wants Tirant for herself, but he rebuffs her sexual advances. Estefania, now engaged to Diafebus, and Pleasure-of-My-Life let Tirant secretly enter Carmesina's bedchamber. The princess is half sleep and Tirant begins to caress her. When Carmesina becomes aware of Tirant's presence, she screams awakening the court. Tirant flees through a window of the tower with the help of a rope. The rope is too short and he is forced to jump from a great height breaking one of his legs. The next day, Tirant tries to hide what had occurred, simulating a fall from a horse, but he breaks his other leg and ends up bedridden.

Meanwhile, the Empress begins an affair with Hippolytus, a young member of Tirant's entourage. The couple barely escapes being found together in bed by the emperor. An Ottoman emissary arrives at the Byzantine court to ask for Carmesina's hand in marriage for Mehmed. The Emperor asks for a day before he can gives his consent, but Carmesina takes matters on her own hands. In broad daylight, she goes to Tirant's tent and has sex with the bedridden hero. When Carmesina refuses to marry Mehmed because she has been with Tirant, war breaks out. In the decisive battle, Tirant kills the sultan, but he returns from the battlefields badly wounded and dies on the way back. Carmesina dies of grief. After the death of the emperor of Byzantium, Hippolytus marries the Empress and becomes the new ruler. Diafebus and Estefania sail away from Constantinople after Tirant's death.

== Production and cast ==
The film was shot in English. It was filmed in Madrid, Istanbul, Palermo, Granada, Huelva, Barcelona and Valencia. The title sequence features four paintings by Paolo Uccello: Saint George and the Dragon in National Gallery, London, and three versions of The Battle of San Romano.

- Casper Zafer as Tirant lo Blanc
- Esther Nubiola as Carmesina
- Leonor Watling as Pleasure-of-My-Life
- Ingrid Rubio as Estefania
- Jane Asher as the Empress
- Charlie Cox as Diafebus
- Sid Mitchel as Hippolytus
- Rafael Amargo as the Grand Turk Mehmed II
- José Antonio Marín as Melchor
- Jay Benedict as the Turkish Ottoman Ambassador
- Victoria Abril as Ines, the 'Placid Widow'
- Giancarlo Giannini as the Emperor
- Rebecca Cobos as Eliseo

== See also ==
- List of historical drama films

== Sources ==
- Majarín, Sara (2013). Una vida de cine: Pasión, Utopía, Historia: Lecciones de Vicente Aranda. Editorial Zumaque S.L. ISBN 9788494011016.
