= Ordinary People (The Vampire Diaries) =

- The Vampire Diaries episode
- Episode no.: Season 3 Episode 8
- Directed by: J. Miller Tobin
- Story by: Nick Wauters
- Teleplay by: Julie Plec; Caroline Dries
- Cinematography by: Dave Perkal
- Editing by: Lance Anderson
- Production code: 2J6008
- Original air date: November 3, 2011

Guest appearances
- Claire Holt as Rebekah Mikaelson; Daniel Gillies as Elijah Mikaelson; Sebastian Roché as Mikael Mikaelson; Alice Evans as Esther

Episode chronology
← Previous "Ghost World"	Next → "Homecoming"
- The Vampire Diaries season 3

"Ordinary People" is the eighth episode of the third season of the American supernatural teen drama television series The Vampire Diaries, and the 52nd of the series. It aired on The CW on November 3, 2011. The episode's teleplay was written by series co-developer Julie Plec and co-executive producer Caroline Dries based on a story by consulting producer Nick Wauters, while J. Miller Tobin served as director.

== Plot ==
Alaric (Matt Davis) and Damon (Ian Somerhalder) bring Elena (Nina Dobrev) to the tunnel cave to show her the drawings they found and as it seems the drawings are connected to the Original family. The name of Mikael is also carved and they figure out that Mikael is the father of the Originals. Alaric takes pictures of the drawings to study them and put everything together.

Elena goes to Rebekah (Claire Holt) to ask her about her family's story. When Rebekah denies saying anything, Elena tells her that they are going to wake Mikael (Sebastian Roché) and Rebekah finally starts talking. Many years ago, when she and her family were still humans, they moved to Mystic Falls and were living in peace with their neighbors, the werewolves. One day, a werewolf killed their younger brother and that ended their friendship.

Mikael and Esther (Alice Evans), wanting to protect the rest of their children, used magic to turn them into vampires. Esther was a witch and the one who cast the spell despite the warnings not to do it. Rebekah tells Elena that with every strength they gained, they also gained a weakness and that is why vampires cannot walk in the sun or get into a house if they are not invited in. The oak tree that was used for the spell and gave them life, it could now take it away. As the only thing that could kill them, the Original family burned the tree down.

As vampires, they were craving for blood and when Klaus (Joseph Morgan) made his first kill, his werewolf gene was triggered. Esther tried to fix it by putting the curse on Klaus so his werewolf nature to stay hidden. The revelation of Klaus being the son of a werewolf hurt their father's pride and it led him to kill half of the village, including Esther's lover, as well as Esther herself for her betrayal. This results to be the beginning of the war between the vampires and the werewolves that is present to this day. Rebekah, Klaus, and Elijah (Daniel Gillies) buried their mother and promised to stay together always and forever.

In the meantime, Damon frees Stefan (Paul Wesley) and they go to a bar to hang out. Damon lets Stefan feed on the people and the two of them have fun together. While being at the bar, Mikael finds them and asks where he can find Klaus. Stefan denies to tell him but when Mikael threatens to kill Damon, Stefan says that he can bring Klaus back to Mystic Falls for him.

Alaric manages to figure out what every symbol on the wall means with Bonnie's (Kat Graham) help and they go back to the cave with Elena. The story reveals that Klaus was the one who killed Esther and not Mikael but he lied about it so he will not lose his siblings. Elena tells Rebekah the truth but Rebekah says that Klaus is still her brother and she warns Elena that if she goes after her brother, she will kill her.

The episode ends with Elena telling Damon that if there is someone who can help Stefan come back and stop being the Ripper, it will be him because Stefan loves his brother.

== Music ==
In "Ordinary People" one can hear the songs:

- "Shake It Loose" by The Kicks
- "Losing Ground" by Trent Dabbs
- "Turn It On" by The Cadillac Black
- "Get Your Buzz On" by The Cadillac Black
- "I'm Rockin'" by The Cadillac Black
- "Put Your Hands Up" by Nadine Coyle
- "Don't Stop (Color on the Walls)" by Foster the People
- "We Don't Eat" by James Vincent McMorrow

== Reception ==
=== Ratings ===
In its original American broadcast, "Ordinary People" was watched by 3.51 million; up by 0.23 from the previous episode.

=== Reviews ===
"Ordinary People" received positive reviews.

Carrie Raisler from The A.V. Club gave the episode an A− rating stating that the core of the show is family. "What’s happening in season three is so impressive because it feels like the show is only just now beginning to mine the depths of this emotional core, and yet it is already so strong. I can’t imagine how great it will be once the writers really dig deep."

Diana Steenbergen of IGN rated the episode with 8.5/10 saying that this episode was a more subdued one than usual. "The Vampire Diaries large supporting cast was mainly sidelined this episode, and the focus was on the theme of family. In this, Stefan and Damon became the heart of the episode, and Paul Wesley and Ian Somerhalder took it and ran with it."
