= Bringing Out the Dead (The Vampire Diaries) =

- The Vampire Diaries episode
- Episode no.: Season 3 Episode 13
- Directed by: Jeffrey Hunt
- Written by: Turi Meyer; Al Septien
- Cinematography by: Dave Perkal
- Editing by: Nancy Forner
- Production code: 2J6013
- Original air date: February 2, 2012

Guest appearances
- Claire Holt as Rebekah Mikaelson; Marguerite MacIntyre as Liz Forbes; Daniel Gillies as Elijah Mikaelson; Torrey DeVitto as Meredith Fell; Jack Coleman as Bill Forbes; Nathaniel Buzolic as Kol Mikaelson; Alice Evans as Esther; Persia White as Abby Bennett Wilson

Episode chronology
← Previous "The Ties That Bind"	Next → "Dangerous Liaisons"
- The Vampire Diaries season 3

"Bringing Out the Dead" is the thirteenth episode of the third season of the American supernatural teen drama television series The Vampire Diaries, and the 57th of the series. It aired on The CW on February 2, 2012. The episode was written by co-executive producers Turi Meyer and Al Septien, and directed by Jeffrey Hunt.

== Plot ==
Damon (Ian Somerhalder) and Stefan (Paul Wesley) have hidden the fourth coffin in the cave under the Lockwood property where vampires cannot get in to keep it safe. Stefan gets Bonnie (Kat Graham) and Abby (Persia White) there and asks them to open it.

Elijah (Daniel Gillies) is mad at Klaus (Joseph Morgan) for stabbing him. Klaus tells him that Mikael is dead and he needs his help to destroy Stefan because he took the coffins and he still has the fourth one. Elijah finds a note from Damon in his pocket and the two meet arranging a dinner for Klaus and Stefan to talk.

At the dinner, Stefan and Damon ask Klaus to leave Mystic Falls and let them and Elena (Nina Dobrev) live in peace. In exchange, they will give him the fourth coffin. Klaus does not agree since he wants Elena with him so he will be able to make more hybrids. Damon gets a text from Bonnie who informs him that they are close to open the coffin. Stefan refuses Klaus' offer and Klaus threatens to kill him if Damon will not bring him the coffin.

Damon leaves to get the coffin and Klaus asks Elijah to go with him to make sure nothing will go wrong. A while later, Elijah returns showing Klaus that he removed all the daggers from their siblings who are now awake and mad at Klaus. Klaus tries to run away but he cannot. Elijah tells Damon and Stefan that they are free to go.

Meanwhile, Liz (Marguerite MacIntyre) goes to Elena's house to inform her that they found only her fingerprints on the stake that Brian was killed with. Liz knows that Elena did not kill him but they have to find out who would try to frame her. Damon suspects Meredith (Torrey DeVitto) but Alaric (Matt Davis) and Elena say that it is not her.

Elena goes with Caroline (Candice Accola) to see her father but Meredith tells them that she discharged him the previous night. Caroline finds Bill dead in a hospital's storage room but since he had vampire blood in his system, he wakes up in transition. Elena takes the knife to Alaric who confirms that is one of those he uses to hunt vampires, while Caroline takes her father home. Bill refuses to drink human blood to complete his transformation and dies.

Later on, Elena returns home with Matt (Zach Roerig) to find Alaric has been stabbed. Elena kills him so he can come back to life, while Liz tells her that Meredith has an alibi, so she cannot be the one who committed the murders.

In the meantime, Bonnie and Abby managed to open the fourth coffin but when Stefan and Damon get to the tunnels, they find them both unconscious and the person who was inside the coffin gone. At the end of the episode it is revealed that Esther (Alice Evans), the mother of the Originals, was the person who was inside. She goes to Klaus' house and everyone is surprised to see her. Klaus thinks she is there to kill him but Esther tells him that she forgives him and that she wants them to be a family

== Music ==
In "Bringing Out the Dead" one can hear the songs:

- "Hate and Love" by Jack Savoretti
- "Lullaby" by Sia
- "With Wings" by Amy Stroup

== Reception ==
=== Ratings ===
In its original American broadcast, "Bringing Out the Dead" was watched by 2.74 million; slightly up by 0.03 from the previous episode.

=== Reviews ===
"Bringing Out the Dead" received positive reviews.

Dhalyn Warren from Fanbolt gave the episode an A+ rating saying that the episode was "fantastic" and "perfect". "After the disappointing episode that premiered two weeks ago, “Bringing Out the Dead” definitely showed us why TVD is one of the best shows on television. [...] I have to say, I couldn’t find anything bad about this episode."

Carrie Raisler from The A.V. Club gave the episode an A− rating characterizing it as a plot-heavy, twist-ridden, rollercoaster of a good time. "The most surprising thing is how easily the show is able to churn up an episode full of absolute madness and then casually drop in a pitch-perfect emotional scene in the middle of the carnage. It’s an impressive feat." Raisler continues saying that the status quality for the season has shifted. "Avoiding the traditional “one season, one big bad” model for supernatural shows has been a stroke of genius for TVD, especially because it often seems that just as I get weary of a storyline, the writers immediately roll out the next one, alleviating any fears. [...] Giving [Klaus] an entire family to mix with and create new agendas with is a fascinating turn, and one I’ve been waiting on for quite a while."

Diana Steenbergen from IGN rated the episode with 8.5/10 saying that the title "was right on the nose and Bringing Out the Dead was exactly what happened. [...] If the clan of Originals will be working together again, things are not looking good for the rest of the residents of Mystic Falls, so we have the fallout from that to look forward to."
