= The End of the Affair (The Vampire Diaries) =

- The Vampire Diaries episode
- Episode no.: Season 3 Episode 3
- Directed by: Chris Grismer
- Written by: Caroline Dries
- Cinematography by: Dave Perkal
- Editing by: Nathan Easterling
- Production code: 2J6003
- Original air date: September 29, 2011

Guest appearances
- Marguerite MacIntyre as Liz Forbes; Claire Holt as Rebekah Mikaelson; Sebastian Roché as Mikael Mikaelson; Jack Coleman as Bill Forbes

Episode chronology
← Previous "The Hybrid"	Next → "Disturbing Behavior"
- The Vampire Diaries season 3

"The End of the Affair" is the third episode of the third season of the American supernatural teen drama television series The Vampire Diaries, and the 47th of the series. It aired on The CW on September 29, 2011. The episode was written by co-executive producer Caroline Dries and directed by Chris Grismer.

== Plot ==
Katherine (Nina Dobrev) calls Damon (Ian Somerhalder) and tells him that she knows where Stefan (Paul Wesley) and Klaus (Joseph Morgan) are. Damon gets Elena and go to Chicago to find Stefan. At Chicago, Damon takes Elena to Stefan's old apartment and shows her all the names of Stefan's victims back in the 1920s when he was "The Ripper". He leaves her there while he goes to search for Stefan and Elena reads Stefan's journal.

Klaus and Stefan get to a bar at Chicago to meet a witch named Gloria (Charmin Lee), who can help Klaus find out what went wrong when he tried to make hybrids. While being at the bar, Stefan sees a picture of his and Klaus from the 1920s but he does not remember about it. He realizes that he and Klaus knew each other and he asks Klaus how. In flashbacks, we can see that the two men were friends and Stefan also had a relationship with Klaus’ sister, Rebekah (Claire Holt). Klaus takes Stefan to his old apartment and when Elena hears them, she hides in the closet. Stefan sees her while being there but he covers her so Klaus will not know she is there.

In the meantime, Damon goes to the bar and Gloria tells him that Stefan and Klaus were there but they left and will be back later. Damon gets back to the apartment to get Elena and go at the bar. He tells her that he will keep Klaus occupied so she can inject Stefan with vervain to weaken him and be able to take him back home. Stefan and Klaus return to the bar but Elena is not able to inject Stefan who tells her to go back home and forget about him. Inside the bar, Damon and Klaus get into a fight but Gloria stops Klaus before he kills Damon. She also tells Klaus that to find answers to his questions about the hybrids, they have to contact the Original Witch and Rebekah is the only one who can help them with that.

Back in Mystic Falls, Bill (Jack Coleman) still keeps Caroline (Candice Accola) tied up and tortures her claiming that he does it to "fix" her. Despite Caroline trying to explain that she is not hurting anyone and that she learned how to control her urges, Bill keeps saying that she needs to be "fixed". On his way out the basement, Liz (Marguerite MacIntyre) waits for him while pointing a gun on him. With Bill unable to do anything, Tyler (Michael Trevino) unties Caroline and along with Liz, they take her back home.

In another flashback to the 1920s, it is revealed that Klaus compelled Stefan to forget about him and Rebekah, after an attack from someone who hunts Klaus and Rebekah down for years. Klaus tells Rebekah that they found them and they have to run but when Rebekah refuses to go with him but wants to stay with Stefan, he stabs her with the dagger and puts her in the coffin. When he grabs her, Rebekah's necklace falls without her noticing it. Stefan sees the necklace and picks it up while it is revealed that is the same necklace he gave to Elena when they first met. When Stefan got the necklace, Katherine was also at the bar and saw him picking it up.

Back in present, Klaus removes the dagger from Rebekah's heart so she will wake up. When she does, Klaus also compels Stefan to remember him and Rebekah from the ‘20s and he reunites with her. Klaus tells her that they need to contact the Original Witch and Rebekah starts searching for her necklace, saying that it is the thing that they need to make the contact possible.

The episode ends with Elena and Damon getting back home and Damon talks with Katherine again. He asks where she is but she refuses to tell him. When they hang up, it is revealed that Katherine is in Chicago.

== Feature Music ==
In "The End of the Affair" we can hear the songs:

- "Shelter" by Birdy
- "Kale" by Nerves Junior
- "Blood Call" by The Elliots
- "We Come Out At Night" by Snake!Snake!Snakes!
- "You Should Know" by Pink Frost
- "My Sweet Hunk O' Trash" by Gloria's 1920s Band
- "Run Wild" by Ume
- "Distance" by Christina Perri
- "St. James Infirmary" by Gloria's 1920s Band

== Reception ==
=== Ratings ===
In its original American broadcast, "The End of the Affair" was watched by 2.74 million; up by 0.22 from the previous episode.

=== Reviews ===
"The End of the Affair" received positive reviews.

Carrie Raisler from The A.V. Club gave the episode and A− rating saying that it was another great episode that "signals just how much season three is shaping up to be potentially something really special. Not only are the performances strong, the writing excellent, and the overall arc of the season intriguing, but all of the plots are so much more emotionally complicated than they have been in the past."

Diana Steenbergen from IGN rated the episode with 8/10 saying that the episode gave plenty of information and some surprising twists. "[The episode] was extremely flashback heavy and the scenes in the 1920s contained an unexpected amount of information [...] This particular episode, with its potentially game-changing revelations, benefited by focusing in on half the usual number of characters."

Caroline Preece from Den of Geek gave a good review to the episode saying that the episode had its great moments. "It's another strong instalment, but things need to move quickly if it can hold the attention of those hoping for more of the promised relationship drama. Rebecca looks like a solid addition to the Stefan saga, but now they need to think of something for Elena and Damon to do."
