= Ghost World (The Vampire Diaries) =

- The Vampire Diaries episode
- Episode no.: Season 3 Episode 7
- Directed by: David Jackson
- Written by: Rebecca Sonnenshine
- Cinematography by: David Perkal
- Editing by: Sean Albertson; Tyler Cook
- Production code: 2J6007
- Original air date: October 27, 2011

Guest appearances
- Malese Jow as Anna; Taylor Kinney as Mason Lockwood; Arielle Kebbel as Lexi Branson; Kelly Hu as Pearl; Stephen Martines as Frederick; Jasmine Guy as Sheila Bennett

Episode chronology
| ← Previous "Smells Like Teen Spirit" | Next → "Ordinary People" |
- The Vampire Diaries season 3

"Ghost World" is the seventh episode of the third season of the American supernatural teen drama television series The Vampire Diaries, and the 51st of the series. It aired on The CW on October 27, 2011. The episode was written by story editor Rebecca Sonnenshine and directed by David Jackson.

== Plot ==
Damon (Ian Somerhalder) wakes up tied up in a chair and with the fire poker sticking out of his chest thinking that Stefan (Paul Wesley) is the one who did this to him. When Stefan says that it was not him, Damon is sure that it was Mason (Taylor Kinney) who wants to avenge his death. Damon goes to Bonnie (Kat Graham) to inform her about it and asks her to fix it.

Elena (Nina Dobrev), after reading Stefan’s journals, believes that the only person who can tell her how to help Stefan get his humanity back is his friend Lexi (Arielle Kebbel). She asks for Jeremy’s (Steven R. McQueen) help to contact her but Jeremy does not know how to do it since he has never had an emotional connection with her and because of that he does not know how to call her ghost.

Bonnie hopes that the ghost who haunted Damon was Vicki (Kayla Ewell) but Matt (Zach Roerig) reassures her that Vicki is gone. Bonnie realizes that if Mason can physically interact with their world, then every ghost can do it. She goes with Caroline (Candice Accola) to the place where she brought Jeremy back to life to cast a spell asking for help. While she does it, her grandmother, Sheila (Jasmine Guy), appears. After the spell, ghosts not only can interact but also everyone is able to see them in town; Elena can see Anna (Malese Jow), Damon and Alaric (Matt Davis) can see Mason and Stefan can see Lexi.

Sheila explains to Bonnie that by bringing Jeremy back she cracked the door to the Other Side and the Original Witch took advantage of it. The ghosts also did the same and now they can come and go in free will. Bonnie has to close the door again and to do it she has to destroy Elena’s necklace, since it is from where the Original Witch draws power. They try to find the necklace but they cannot and the girls believe that Anna took it because she does not want to leave Jeremy.

Mason asks an apology from Damon and Damon refuses to give it. He kind of does it when Mason mentions that he knows a way to kill Klaus (Joseph Morgan). Mason asks Damon to meet him at the old Lockwood cell, to come alone and bring a shovel, while Lexi meets Stefan and offers her help. Stefan refuses it so she knocks him down and locks him up. She then finds Elena and takes her to him to show her how to help Stefan find his humanity.

Elena asks Bonnie to not close the door yet to give Lexi the time she needs to help Stefan but the other ghosts want to take revenge on the members of the founding families and they start killing people. Anna still refuses that she took the necklace but when Elena tells her that by staying she only holds Jeremy back, she gives the necklace back and Bonnie starts the ritual to destroy it along with her grandmother.

Damon and Mason are in the tunnels of the old Lockwood property trying to find the hidden secret of how they can kill Klaus. They reach at a cave but Damon cannot get in since it is protected with a spell and no vampires can enter. Mason finds something but before he manages to tell Damon what, he disappears. Lexi also disappears letting Elena know what to do with Stefan. Anna sees her mother again and they disappear together.

Elena tells Stefan that she did not give up on him but she will not love a ghost for the rest of her life so if he does not want to lose her, he should try to help himself. Bonnie is mad at Jeremy for being with Anna all this time and she breaks up with him. She then sees that the necklace in the fireplace is still untouched. Damon calls Alaric to help him with what it is in the cave and Alaric finds some drawings on the walls but he has no idea what they mean.

== Featured music ==
In "Ghost World" we can hear the songs:

- "In Front of You" by the Quiet Kind
- "This Woman's Work" by Greg Laswell (When the Ghosts, Mason, Frederick and the tombs vampires, Lexi, Anna and Pearl and then Bonnie's grandmother: Sheila disappeared and move on)
- "Fever Dreams" by Nurses
- "Come On, Come On" by Michael Johns and The Ontic
- "Hitchhiker" by Empires
- "Changing" by The Airborne Toxic Event

== Reception ==
=== Ratings ===
In its original American broadcast, "Ghost World" was watched by 3.28 million; up by 0.25 from the previous episode.

=== Reviews ===
"Ghost World" received positive reviews.

Carrie Raisler from The A.V. Club gave the episode a B rating saying that the whole "ghost era" went out in style and the writers managed to connect the storyline with the rest of characters, not just Jeremy, very well. "The Vampire Diaries used to be a show I enjoyed but wasn’t emotionally invested in, but sometime around the end of last season, it turned the corner and really began to develop these characters enough to make them emotionally compelling and not just fun quipping plot devices."

Diana Steenbergen from IGN rated the episode with 9/10. "All of the ghosts' disappearances were handled well, from the heartfelt reunion of Anna and Pearl, or Mason, Grams and Lexie leaving after accomplishing what they needed to do, to the tomb vampires vanishing just in time before they overwhelmed Caroline."
