= Casper Zafer =

English actor

Caspar Zafer
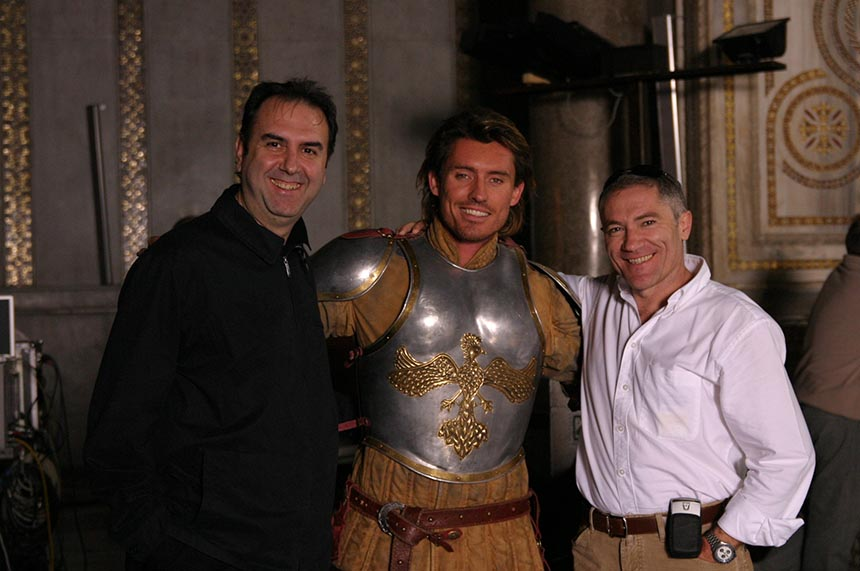
- Caspar Zafer as Tirant lo Blanc in the middle
- Born: 26 October 1974 (age 50); Ukraine
- Occupation: Actor
- Years active: 1999–present
- Height: 6 ft 1 in (1.85 m)

Caspar Zafer (born 26 October 1974) is an English actor. He played the oldest Original vampire in the TV series, The Vampire Diaries and The Originals. He was the oldest brother in the show, and one of the strongest vampires in the verse.

== Career ==
Zafer was born on 26 October 1974 and spent much of his childhood and early life in the Middle East. He trained in theatre at The Oxford School of Drama. From 2001 to 2002 he performed in the television series Dream Team. Following this the movie La Femme Musketeer he held the role of Gaston Athos. Following years he had engagements in different television- and movie productions including Too Much Romance... It's Time for Stuffed Peppers starring alongside Sophia Loren and F. Murray Abraham in 2004, True True Lie and Tirant lo Blanc in 2006 where he played the lead. Following this he starred in numerous films until moving to U.S. TV In 2012 where he had the role from the original vampire Finn Mikaelson in the television series The Vampire Diaries. He starred in The Originals on the CW, reprising his role as Finn Mikaelson in his original body.

== Rowing ==
Zafer is also a world record holder in Ocean rowing. In August 2014 he won the Great Pacific Race along with three others in their boat Uniting Nations. They became the first four-man crew to row 2400 miles from Mainland United States (Monterey) to Wakiki Hawaii. They are also the fastest crossing the Pacific in 43 days.

== Filmography ==
Year	Title	Role
2004	Too Much Romance... It's Time for Stuffed Peppers	Francesco
2005	Nature Unleashed: Tornado	Daniel
2006	True True Lie	Guy
2006	Tirante el Blanco	Tirante
2007	Two Families	Rocco
2014	Coffee Sex You	Michael Scott

== Television ==
Year	Title	Role	Notes
2001–2002	Dream Team (TV series)	Andrei Belanov	
2002	The Hound of the Baskervilles	Warder 1	TV film
2004	La Femme Musketeer	Gaston	2 episodes
2012	The Vampire Diaries	Finn Mikaelson	4 episodes
2015–2016	The Originals	Finn Mikaelson	7 episodes
