= John Behring =

American television director, cinematographer

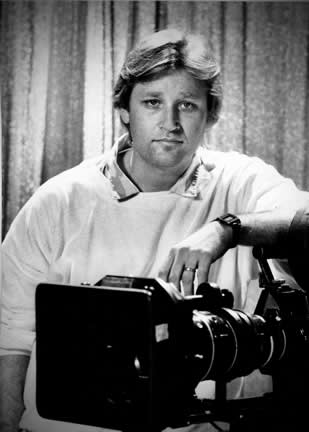
- Born: Canton, South Dakota, U.S.
- Occupations: Television director, cinematographer, and producer
- Years active: 1988–present
- Spouse: Shari (1974-present)
- Children: 3
- Website: johnbehring.tv

John Behring (born in Canton, South Dakota) is an American television director, cinematographer, and producer.

He has directed numerous episodic television dramas including Law and Order, Blue Bloods, Gotham, Lethal Weapon, Law and Order SVU, Arrow, The Flash, Grimm, Legends, Ghost Whisperer, CSI: NY, The 100, One Tree Hill, The Client List, V, Charmed, Dawson's Creek, Life, Crash, Surface, Dark Blue, Hellcats, The Vampire Diaries, and Trauma, among others. He also directed eleven episodes of the series NUMB3RS for which he also served as Supervising Producer for three seasons from 2006 to 2008.

Behring received his bachelor's and master's degree from the University of South Dakota before working for television station WISN-TV in Milwaukee, Wisconsin. He then began shooting local and national television commercials before moving to Los Angeles. Working in commercials for many years, Behring began shooting main titles and opening sequences for television shows in the early 1990s.

Behring's directorial debut was the CBS Schoolbreak Special "My Indian Summer" in 1995. His first episodic drama as a director was the series The Lazarus Man starring Robert Urich in 1996. Since then, he has directed more than 130 episodes of various television series'.

Behring was married in 1974 to his wife Shari, and has three children: Marisa, Chuck, and fellow director Andi.
