= No Exit (The Vampire Diaries) =

- The Vampire Diaries episode
- Episode no.: Season 5 Episode 14
- Directed by: Michael Allowitz
- Written by: Brian Young
- Production code: 2J7514
- Original air date: February 27, 2014

Guest appearances
- Olga Fonda (Nadia); Michael Malarkey (Enzo); Rick Cosnett (Wes Maxfield)

Episode chronology
← Previous "Total Eclipse of the Heart"	Next → "Gone Girl"
- The Vampire Diaries season 5

"No Exit" is the 14th episode of the fifth season of the American series The Vampire Diaries and the series' 103rd episode overall. "No Exit" was originally aired on February 27, 2014, on The CW. The episode was written by Brian Young and directed by Michael Allowitz.

== Plot ==
Enzo (Michael Malarkey) and Damon (Ian Somerhalder) turn people to vampires so that Damon can feed on them since now, after Wes' (Rick Cosnett) injection, he craves vampire blood and not human. The two of them try to leave the last victim's house when Wes appears with travelers who spell the house so vampires will not be able to get out. Wes informs them that he wants to make one last test; how long can Damon last before he attacks his friends to feed on.

Katherine (Nina Dobrev), still pretending to be Elena, tries to get closer to Stefan (Paul Wesley) so they can be back together. When Caroline (Candice Accola) arrives and tells them about Damon, Stefan wants to find him and Katherine offers to go with him. Caroline warns him that it is weird for him to be so close to "Elena" after everything that happened but he reassures her that they are just friends. Before Stefan and Katherine go, Caroline gets a phone call from Tyler (Michael Trevino) who tells her that he worries about Matt (Zach Roerig), who has vanished for two days, and that Nadia (Olga Fonda) was compelling him. Katherine hears Caroline's conversation with Tyler and she calls Nadia to ask if everything is fine. When Nadia tells her that Matt found out that she is not Elena, Katherine asks her to kill him. Caroline leaves to go to Tyler's while Katherine and Stefan leave to find Damon.

Caroline gets to Tyler's and they try to find out why Nadia would compel Matt and what she wants from him. The two of them feel awkward because of what happened between Caroline and Klaus (Joseph Morgan). At the same time, Matt tries to convince Nadia that she does not have to kill him and all he has to do is convince his friends that he is fine. Matt returns home with Nadia and acts like everything is fine. He tells Tyler and Caroline that Nadia is not compelling him and that they just have fun together but Caroline is not really supportive of that. They both depart, leaving Matt and Nadia alone.

Katherine and Stefan are on the road in search of Damon and Katherine tries to seduce Stefan. She breaks the car so they can stay at a hotel she had seen till the car is ready. While there, Enzo calls Stefan to inform him about the situation he and Damon are in but Katherine answers who asks him to text her the address. Stefan goes to get the car and Katherine calls Nadia to tell her that she plans to lead Stefan on killing Damon to save her. Stefan gets back and before they leave the hotel, Katherine gets closer to him and kisses him. He kisses her back but he stops because "Elena" has just broken up with Damon and it is not right.

Enzo chains Damon on a chair in an attempt to prevent him of attacking him. Wes shoots Enzo to make him bleed, so Damon will not be able to resist. Damon breaks the chains and attacks Enzo who tries to tell him to stop. Damon chokes at Enzo's blood and Wes appears to tell him that it is because he had travelers put a spell on it. He offers for Enzo to go with him so he will not be killed by Damon since the spell will not last forever. Enzo does not want to go but Damon convinces him to do it because if he stays he will kill him. Enzo leaves with Wes and Damon stays alone, trapped in the house.

Nadia checks that finally the vervain is out of Matt's system so she can compel him again but before she makes him forget, Matt tries to warn Caroline about Katherine taking over Elena's body. He kisses Nadia who kisses him back and while they are kissing, he tries to text Caroline. He manages to write "Help K" and send it to Caroline before Nadia sees him and stops him. She is hurt by his behavior and trying to fool her, so she compels him and starts to exit the house. Caroline, who got the text, meets Nadia at the door and asks her what is she planning and they start fighting. Tyler gets there in time to stop Nadia from killing Caroline and he fights Nadia who runs away.

Katherine and Stefan arrive at the house where Damon is but Damon warns them to not get into the house because they will not be able to get out and he will attack them. They tell him that they are not afraid of him and they both enter the house. Katherine, to help Damon fight his urge, cuts her hand with a glass and provokes him with her blood telling him that he can fight it. Damon starts feeding on her, Stefan tells him to stop and Katherine kicks a stake towards Stefan telling him that Damon is going to kill her. Stefan, instead of taking the stake, he takes a piece of glass and cuts himself to distract Damon. Damon leaves Katherine and Stefan snaps his neck.

Katherine and Stefan bring Damon back to Mystic Falls and Katherine arranges immediately to meet Nadia. Katherine is happy because, despite her plan to kill Damon not working, she had a moment with Stefan. She stops smiling when Nadia tells her that she was bitten by Tyler Lockwood.

Damon wakes up chained on the Salvatore house's basement. Stefan is there and Damon tries to warn him that because of his cravings, one day he will kill him but Stefan tells him that they will find a solution. Damon points to Stefan that "Elena" provoked him to feed on her and then she kicked a stake towards him so he will kill him. Stefan does not believe that Elena would want that, he locks Damon up and gets upstairs where Caroline is. The two of them discuss what happened between Stefan and "Elena" and Caroline also tells him about Nadia and Matt and the text he sent to her. From Matt's text, who used "K" and not "E", they put the pieces together and they realize that Katherine is in Elena's body.

== Feature music ==
In the "No Exit" episode we can hear the songs:

- "Radioactive" by Imagine Dragons
- "You Belong Here" by Leagues
- "Fleur Blanche" by Örsten
- "Poisonous Spider" by Company

== Reception ==
=== Ratings ===
In its original American broadcast, "No Exit" was watched by 2.03 million; down by 0.13 from the previous episode.

=== Reviews ===
"No Exit" received mixed to negative reviews with many hoping that now that Katherine's secret was revealed, the show will "kick in".

Carrie Raisler from The A.V. Club gave a B rate to the episode saying that it was a filler episode: "this path to realization [finding out that Katherine is in Elena's body] basically creates a filler episode, a way to move the story to the place it needs to be for the inevitable big confrontation in the future [...] Katherine taking over Elena’s life was an incredibly inspired storyline, and watching it unfold has been delightful, but sooner or later, someone had to figure out what was going on. To spend an episode almost solely focused on making that happen is a good thing."

Alyse Wax of Fearnet writes, "I miss the bad-assery this show used to have. Julie Plec took it all with her and stuffed it into The Originals. [...] All of the awesome, violent, supernatural drama has been replaced with standard who's-sleeping-with-who nonsense, ever since the original vampires got their own show. I guess Klaus really took the bad-assery with him. Well, now everyone knows that 'Elena' is really Katherine, so hopefully the crazy shit will kick in."

Caroline Preece from Den of Geek gave a negative review saying that season five of the show has been the worst by far. "[The show] stopped being a fast-paced, well-written vampire show and became a long-running soap that happened to have mythical creatures in it. That’s not what any of us signed up for but, with the Katherine storyline presumably on its way out now that Stefan and Caroline have figured out the deceit and Nadia has a dreaded werewolf bite to contend with, maybe the next half-arsed arc will be better? Let’s hope so because, since we all know how fantastically entertaining this show can be at its best, there is always a glimmer of hope that it can return to form."

Stephanie Hall from K Site TV said that overall the episode left her a feeling that this was an off week of the show. ""No Exit" was an uncharacteristically odd episode of The Vampire Diaries that primarily served to stall the impending solutions of this run of episodes' two most pressing issues: Katherine and Damon. While it did bring our heroes a step closer to solving both of these problems, the ways in which it did so were not delivered with as much metaphoric bang as could be hoped."

Matt Richenthal of TV Fanatic rated the episode with only 1.3/5 saying that it was one boring hour of television and that the writers recycles scenes and stories from previous episodes/seasons. "We knew from the moment Katherine inhabited Elena's body that she would eventually be found out. What other alternative possibly existed? So we've been waiting and waiting and waiting for that moment for weeks and that's exactly what tonight's episode felt like."

== Notes ==
- The episode was dedicated to Sarah Jones, who lost her life on February 20, 2014 on a train accident while being on set.
