= The Vampire Diaries season 5 =

The Vampire Diaries
- Season 5
- Season 5 DVD cover
- Showrunner: Julie Plec
- Starring: Nina Dobrev; Paul Wesley; Ian Somerhalder; Steven R. McQueen; Kat Graham; Candice Accola; Zach Roerig; Michael Trevino
- No. of episodes: 22

Release
- Original network: The CW
- Original release: October 3, 2013 – May 15, 2014

Season chronology
- ← Previous; Season 4 Next → Season 6

The Vampire Diaries, an American supernatural drama, was renewed for a fifth season by the CW on February 11, 2013. The fifth season premiered on October 3, 2013, followed by the series premiere of the spin-off series The Originals.

== Cast ==
=== Main ===
- Nina Dobrev as Elena Gilbert / Katherine Pierce / Amara
- Paul Wesley as Stefan Salvatore / Silas / Tom Avery
- Ian Somerhalder as Damon Salvatore
- Steven R. McQueen as Jeremy Gilbert
- Kat Graham as Bonnie Bennett
- Candice Accola as Caroline Forbes
- Zach Roerig as Matt Donovan / Gregor
- Michael Trevino as Tyler Lockwood / Julian

=== Recurring ===
- Olga Fonda as Nadia Petrova
- Rick Cosnett as Wes Maxfield
- Michael Malarkey as Enzo St. John
- Shaun Sipos as Aaron Whitmore
- Penelope Mitchell as Liv Parker
- Chris Brochu as Luke Parker
- Marguerite MacIntyre as Liz Forbes
- Kendrick Sampson as Jesse
- Janina Gavankar as Qetsiyah/Tessa
- Caitlin McHugh as Sloan
- Raffi Barsoumian as Markos

=== Special guest ===
- Jasmine Guy as Sheila Bennett

=== Special appearance ===
- David Anders as John Gilbert
- Sara Canning as Jenna Sommers
- Daniel Gillies as Elijah Mikaelson
- Bianca Lawson as Emily Bennett
- Joseph Morgan as Klaus Mikaelson

=== Guest ===
- Rick Worthy as Rudy Hopkins
- Matt Davis as Alaric Saltzman
- Kayla Ewell as Vicki Donovan
- Claire Holt as Rebekah Mikaelson
- Jason MacDonald as Grayson Gilbert
- Hayley Kiyoko as Megan King
- Nathaniel Buzolic as Kol Mikaelson
- Heather Hemmens as Maggie James
- Arielle Kebbel as Lexi Branson

== Episodes ==
No. overall	No. in season	Title	Directed by	Written by	Original release date	Prod. code	U.S. viewers (millions)
90	1	"I Know What You Did Last Summer"	Lance Anderson	Caroline Dries	October 3, 2013	2J7501	2.59
With her relationship with Damon still intact, Elena begins her freshman year of college with Caroline at Whitmore College, excited about the chance to have a normal human experience, but their good time ends badly when their roommate is brutally murdered by what seems to be another vampire. Damon is left to take care of Jeremy, who has trouble adjusting back into school after telling everyone he faked his own death. After an altercation at school, he is expelled. Bonnie, still dead doesn't want anyone to know that she is dead and has Jeremy masquerade as her. Katherine has trouble adjusting to being human again and needs Damon's help after Silas comes after her and also her other enemies who are after her as she is vulnerable. Matt says goodbye to Rebekah after their summer traveling together and runs into an old friend named Nadia. Stefan is still in the locker underwater and is hallucinating while fighting the urge to turn off his humanity.
91	2	"True Lies"	Joshua Butler	Brian Young	October 10, 2013	2J7502	2.14
Underwater, Stefan has hallucinations of Damon telling him to turn off his humanity in order to get out. At Whittemore, Elena and Caroline try to figure out how Megan knew Elena's father and why her murder was covered up by the school. The autopsy report reveals that a mysterious professor covered up the true cause of death. Jeremy and Matt go on the run with Katherine with Silas on their tail. Caroline bonds with Jesse over their bad relationships. Elena, under the control of Silas, ties Damon up and attempts to kill him, but by focusing on the negative feeling she's had about Stefan all summer she returns to normal before she can carry out Silas' wishes. She finds out the truth about Stefan and temporarily drops out of college to go look for him. Elena tells Damon that even though Stefan will be there she will still love him. Elena, Damon and Sheriff Forbes find Stefan's safe, but instead of Stefan, they find a dead body, meaning Stefan was very hungry and could have turned off his humanity.
92	3	"Original Sin"	Jesse Warn	Melinda Hsu Taylor & Rebecca Sonnenshine	October 17, 2013	2J7503	2.93
Stefan finally surfaces after three months being locked in a safe underwater in the quarry. When Elena tells Damon that she had a dream about Stefan in a bar, Katherine says she had them too. Damon and Elena, alongside Katherine go to a bar to search for Stefan where they find the waitress who was bitten by Stefan. Qetsiyah has Stefan hostage and tells her version of how Silas became immortal. Qetsiyah reveals that she was originally to marry Silas and made the spell for him, when he betrayed her to take the immortality spell with the woman he really loved, Qetsiyah's handmaiden, Amara, she created the cure and killed Amara. Qetsiyah continues to divulge her plans of destroying Silas by using Stefan to make him weaker. Nadia uses magic on Matt to contact Gregor (whom she killed to fool Silas) and uses him to get information about Katherine's whereabouts from Elena. Nadia kidnaps Katherine and goes to Silas to give her but she realizes that he is using her. When Damon finds Stefan, Qetsiyah warns him that Stefan and Elena are destined and he is just in the way. Qetsiyah performs a spell on Stefan, connecting him to Silas and ridding Silas of his psychic powers. When Stefan awakes following Qetsiyah's spell, he is suffering from amnesia.
93	4	"For Whom the Bell Tolls"	Michael Allowitz	Brett Matthews & Elisabeth R. Finch	October 24, 2013	2J7504	2.63
When Damon tries to remind Stefan about him and his past, Stefan has a problem with restraining. While Elena tries to help Stefan remember how they met and their past, Matt looks for help from Jeremy regarding his missing blocks of time and unusual circumstances upon waking up. Matt gets upset about Bonnie's lack of response to the people that need her, causing Jeremy to leave quickly. Jeremy is forced to tell Damon the truth about Bonnie. When Elena finally convinces Stefan to restrain himself, he tries to kiss her but she rejects him, citing her relationship with Damon, making him jealous and hungry. With all of this Stefan decides to turn his humanity off and feed from humans, he goes to the graveyard where he meets Caroline and Jesse and ends up attacking Jesse. Caroline is able to get Stefan under control and he trusts her. Back at the Salvatore mansion, Stefan burns his journals and tells Damon and Elena that he doesn't trust them and doesn't want to be around them. Elena finally learns that Bonnie is dead when Damon is forced to tell her. At an emotional gathering to ring the bell for Bonnie, she is able to speak to her friends with Jeremy relaying her words. Tyler returns when Damon, Elena, Caroline, Matt and Jeremy are honoring Bonnie's death. The mysterious professor, Wes, realizes that Jesse has vampire blood in his system and gives him an injection in an attempt to kill him.
94	5	"Monster's Ball"	Kellie Cyrus	Sonny Postiglione	October 31, 2013	2J7505	2.07
Elena tries to move on after the revelation of Bonnie's death. Damon and Jeremy develop a plan to return Bonnie to the living by using Silas who is trying to make himself mortal and commit a suicide; a life for a life. But the only way they could bring back Bonnie is by killing Stefan, that's what Silas' offer is. After a public meal Nadia reveals to Katherine that she is responsible for her mother's death in Paris when Klaus' minions came for her. Katherine attacks Nadia in the restaurant and escapes. At the Monster's Ball, Damon kills Stefan to temporarily restore psychic powers to Silas in order to get in Qetsiyah's mind and find the location of a supernatural marker. Believing that Silas is Stefan, Qetsiyah dance with Silas and once his powers are restored he compels Qetsiyah to reveal where the marker is. Qetsiyah divulges that she doesn't know the location of the marker, as the Travelers hid it after they killed her and move it constantly, she is instead looking for an amulet that amplifies her powers. Stefan revives from his most recent snapped-neck and snaps Damon's neck, rushing to save Qetsiyah from Silas. Retaliating, Qetsiyah crushes Silas' heart, though it won't kill him, it will cause him to rot from the inside out. A tense conversation with Wes and Elena ends with him telling her to pack her bags, drop out of school and return to Mystic Falls, stating that they won't see each other again. Nadia shocks Katherine by telling her that Katherine did in fact killed her mother when she became a vampire as Nadia is Katherine's daughter. With revenge on his mind, Tyler decides to go after Klaus and ends his relationship with Caroline, seemingly for good, in the process. Damon and Elena use Katherine to bring Silas back as a witch, but despite being drained of blood, Katherine revives.
95	6	"Handle with Care"	Jeffrey Hunt	Caroline Dries & Holly Brix	November 7, 2013	2J7506	2.59
Katherine, who needs desperate help, goes after Caroline and asks for help. The two collude and go after professor Wes, of whom Caroline is suspicious, and try to find out his motives against vampires. Elena who thinks Stefan is in danger goes to save him from Qetsiyah but ends up trapped as well. Damon and Jeremy help Silas find the anchor of the other side. Qetsiyah reveals to Damon that the anchor is not an object; in fact, it is Silas's lost love Amara. Silas is able to free Amara but she attacks him and takes the cure. Damon and Jeremy decide to take Amara to use her as leverage against Silas. Katherine replaces Elena and goes to a secret community where vampires are not allowed, the same community that professor Wes is part of. When they are done with Wes, Caroline compels him to think that Elena and she are not vampires. Qetsiyah brings Stefan's memories back when he frees Elena from the trap. Katherine starts suffering from being returned to life as her hair starts to grey.
96	7	"Death and the Maiden"	Leslie Libman	Rebecca Sonnenshine	November 14, 2013	2J7507	2.72
Now that he got his memories back Stefan is on a mission to kill Silas so he could get his revenge. Katherine realizes she is dying from having the cure taken from her. When Bonnie meets Amara, Amara shows that she can both see and touch her which she explains is because she is the anchor to the other side. Damon and Elena realize that the only way they could get Bonnie back is by turning her as the anchor to the other side. That's why Damon goes to Qetsiyah and ask if she can do the spell. Qetsiyah reveals that the only way the spell can be done is by getting Amara with Elena and Katherine together and getting a drop of their blood. Katherine tells Qetsiyah that she will give her blood only if Qetsiyah helps her stop Katherine from aging, which Qetsiyah agrees. When Qetsiyah starts the spell, Silas shows up. Qetsiyah is wounded and Amara is taken by Stefan to lure Silas. Before Silas can kill her, Stefan stops him and kills him. Amara stabs and kills herself. Qetsiyah is able to return Bonnie and make her the anchor and then decides to kill herself. As she passes over to the Other Side, she reveals to Bonnie that by being the anchor, she will feel every death of every supernatural. Nadia tries to get on with Katherine who doesn't want to have anything to do with her.
97	8	"Dead Man on Campus"	Rob Hardy	Brian Young & Neil Reynolds	November 21, 2013	2J7508	2.67
With Bonnie back, Elena and Caroline decide to throw a party, but Bonnie has problems by being the connection to the other side when supernatural creatures die and use her to move on. Jesse, who is a new vampire has problems and asks Caroline for help. Even after killing Silas, Stefan has some trouble remembering everything that happened the past summer. At the party, Elena sends Damon to take some questions from Wes about his vampire tests. Katherine uses Stefan and Nadia to find out Gregor's (in Matt's body) motives even when Silas is dead. Gregor reveals that his mission was to kill Silas and then go after Katherine and kill her. Katherine stabs Matt with a special knife and Gregor's spirit is forced to leave his body. Wes reveals to Damon that Jesse was created to feed only from other vampires. Damon is attacked by Jesse and Elena is forced to kill him in order to save Damon. Caroline is somewhat understanding, but nevertheless disappointed, believing Elena's relationship with Damon is affecting her judgement. A desperate Katherine decides to jump out of the clock tower and kill herself but is saved by Stefan. While Bonnie and Jeremy make out Jesse appears, having to go through Bonnie. Bonnie finally tells Jeremy what it means to be the Anchor to the Other Side. In the end, Bonnie says it's worth it and they have sex. Wes reveals to Damon more about the blood tests and an organization named 'Augustine' which Damon remembers from his past. Wes escapes his bonds and captures Damon. In the final scene, Damon is seen stuck in a cage with his initials carved on the walls.
98	9	"The Cell"	Chris Grismer	Melinda Hsu Taylor	December 5, 2013	2J7509	2.36
Flashback to the 1953, Damon is vervained. As Damon is caged in the present, Wes reveals his plans to use him as his next test object. Stefan decides to look after Katherine, who is even more desperate now that she is dying. Elena asks for help from Aaron to find Wes. Back in 1953, Damon is experimented on by Dr. Whittemore. Caroline brings the safe Stefan spend three months under water in, so he could deal with his problems. Wes is forced to vervain Elena and reveal the truth about vampires to Aaron in order to secure him. When Elena is trapped by Wes in a cage she meets Damon, who tells her about The Whittemore family and how he survived. Damon reveals to Elena that with him was a man named Enzo. Katherine comes up with the perfect idea that can help Stefan move on from his fear from the safe: Katherine got into the safe with him. While Katherine works with Stefan through his real problem, Elena dumping him, Damon shares his past to Elena. Enzo and Damon had come up with a plan to escape. Enzo gave Damon his daily ration of blood for a year and then at a party, Damon attacked the rest of the humans at the party. A candle set the place on fire and Damon abandoned Enzo to die. Aaron confronts Elena about his family's deaths, and Damon reveals that as a part of his revenge, he killed all of the Whitmore family except one, preferring to wait for more generations to be born so he could continue his revenge. Caroline overhears Katherine and Stefan having sex. Aaron shoots Damon while Elena is taken away and meets Enzo, who is still locked up after all these years.
99	10	"Fifty Shades of Grayson"	Kellie Cyrus	Caroline Dries	December 12, 2013	2J7510	2.44
Damon manages to escape his cage while Katherine wakes up with Stefan to find her gray hair falling out. While Elena is trapped by Wes, who is continuing his research, Damon decides to ask Stefan for help in getting Elena back. Damon comes up with a plan where they will offer to exchange Aaron to save Elena; if Wes doesn't give them Elena back they will kill Aaron. Wes reveals to Elena that her father was a doctor practicing on vampires and using their blood to help other people. Katherine continues to struggle with aging and enlists Matt to help her, who then calls Nadia. Damon is shocked when he meets his old friend Enzo who is not too pleased to see him. Though Damon saves Enzo from Wes, the latter remains indignant with him, saying Damon will always be a monster. When Wes is on his way to turn Elena into a vampire ripper like Jesse, Stefan is able to save her. Later on Damon ends his relationship with Elena when she tries to overlook his gritty past with the Whitmores. Damon feels Elena should not have to make excuses for him, and sees her attempted resolve as only an indication of her changing. Nadia returns to Mystic Falls and tries to convince Katherine in becoming a traveler so she could live longer, which Katherine declines when she thinks Stefan has feelings for her. Aaron tells Wes to leave him alone as he steals a vial from the lab. Katherine realizes that she was wrong about Stefan and decides to accept the deal, but just when she does she collapses.
100	11	"500 Years of Solitude"	Chris Grismer	Julie Plec & Caroline Dries	January 23, 2014	2J7511	2.72
Nadia is trying to save her dying mother, Katherine, and comes up with a frightening plan. Elena and Stefan are forced to help Nadia to enact her plan after Nadia threw Matt in the safe which Stefan spent the summer locked in. Bonnie, Caroline and Jeremy search for Matt's location, but the returning Rebekah saves him. Katherine, who continues to fight for her life, remembers her time in Bulgaria back in 1492. Klaus also returns and confronts Caroline to admit her feelings for him; this later results in them sleeping together. After Nadia leads them, Elena and Stefan are trapped in a house full of travelers who are doing an unknown ritual. However, Elena and Stefan are able to escape, and later Elena goes to Katherine to forgive her for all the bad things that she did to her. Tyler returns as well and he catches up with the group. Upon her speech, Katherine attacks Elena and finish the ritual, officially becoming a traveler in Elena's body.
101	12	"The Devil Inside"	Kellie Cyrus	Brett Matthews & Sonny Postiglione	January 30, 2014	2J7512	2.42
In order to give Katherine permanent control over Elena's body, Nadia's friend Mia plans to cast a spell for which she needs to use Katherine's corpse. However Damon has already buried it himself, in the tomb where Katherine was supposed to have been buried alive in the 1800s. Katherine compels Matt to give her personal information about Elena so that she can impersonate her at Tyler's welcome home party, and hopefully learn the whereabouts of her corpse. Caroline reveals to Katherine (posing as Elena) that she slept with Klaus, which Tyler overhears and becomes extremely angry and hurt. Enzo brings Aaron Whitmore to Damon, who tells him to complete his killing streak and kill him (just like his parents and grandparents), however Damon declines. Katherine and Nadia are able to find Katherine's corpse, and then complete the spell. Later, Katherine (possessing Elena) breaks up with Damon, which angers Damon and causes him to attack Aaron in the final scene.
102	13	"Total Eclipse of the Heart"	Darren Genet	Rebecca Sonnenshine & Holly Brix	February 6, 2014	2J7513	2.16
Katherine has her sights set on getting back Stefan and Wes on the other hand continues with his experiments. Stefan is uncomfortable with Damon's newly forged friendship with Enzo, who continues to hunt and is now looking for Wes. In order to find Wes' location, Damon and Enzo confront Bonnie and want her to find a witch to make a spell to find Wes' location, and just to make sure Bonnie does that Enzo keeps Jeremy as a hostage. Katherine then asks Nadia to search information about Enzo and who he is so she compels Matt but Tyler overhears it. When Nadia found out that Tyler has overheard her conversation with Matt, she gets angry and attacks him. Jeremy is saved by Stefan and Katherine just in time, and when Damon and Enzo meet Wes they are attacked by a group of travellers. Later it is revealed that Wes injected Damon with something and now Damon starts feeding on other vampires.
103	14	"No Exit"	Michael Allowitz	Brian Young	February 27, 2014	2J7514	2.03
As Damon's behavior escalates from destructive to deadly, Stefan begins to regret their last conversation and decides to track Damon down and intervene. Katherine, masquerading as Elena, decides to accompany him in hopes of sparking a relationship. Dr. Wes enlists the Travelers to set a trap to keep Enzo and Damon trapped in a house until Damon has to feed on Enzo. Enzo calls Stefan for help, but Katherine picks up and decides to try and pit Stefan and Damon against each other. Matt comes back with Nadia and tries to warn Caroline and Tyler, but Nadia compels him before he can. Caroline and Tyler confront Nadia, but don't get any answers from her or Matt. Elena and Stefan find Damon and Damon attacks Katherine (in Elena's body), forcing Stefan to have to break him apart. He then takes Damon back to their basement and chains him up. Later, when Stefan tries to comfort a dejected Caroline, their conversation leads to them figuring out Katherine has taken over Elena's body.
104	15	"Gone Girl"	Lance Anderson	Melinda Hsu Taylor	March 6, 2014	2J7515	2.19
Nadia is hallucinating from the werewolf bite back to her search for her mother and Katherine reaches out to Wes to try and save her. Stefan and Caroline tell everyone about Katherine being a passenger in Elena's body. Tyler tells them that he bit Nadia so they have to come up with a plan to lure Katherine out, but Katherine figures out they know it's her. For the second time, Bonnie and Jeremy must turn to Liv for help to locate Elena/Katherine. Damon baits Tyler, feeds on him, knocks him out, and takes off to seek revenge on Dr. Wes. Katherine goes to find Wes, but instead finds him dead after Damon killed him. Stefan takes Nadia back to the house and Bonnie comforts her, telling her she'll go to the Other Side, as Katherine comes to say good-bye to her daughter. She gives Nadia a dream about what their life could have been like, had she not been taken away. Katherine tries to run, but she's stabbed and killed with the traveler's knife by Stefan. Caroline and Tyler talk and come to a new understanding. Katherine's spirit goes to Bonnie and reveals she injected herself with a combination of werewolf venom and the ripper virus. She then fails to go to the other side and goes to hell instead.
105	16	"While You Were Sleeping"	Pascal Verschooris	Caroline Dries	March 20, 2014	2J7516	2.28
Elena has a nightmare about having her body taken over and wakes up to find her dorm empty. Stefan explains they had to lock her in her dorm after she'd been infected by the virus. Her first instinct is to call Damon but at the same time, Damon is trying to figure out how to tell Elena that he killed Aaron and also infected with the same virus. Elena calls Damon while they are both trapped, but he doesn't tell her. While going through Dr. Wes' files, Caroline discovers that Dr Wes combined the werewolf venom from Nadia's blood with the vampire killing virus, and is surprised when Enzo appears, claiming to have an antidote for the virus, but needs Stefan in order for her to get it. Bonnie works with Liv on teaching her spells. Elena reads her diary that Katherine wrote in and hallucinates Stefan with Katherine and stopping him from doing anything else. Damon shows up in her hallucination but she snaps out of it as blood drips from her nose. Stefan, Caroline, and Enzo go to see the Travelers who have the antidote for Damon's virus and are working on one for Elena's. They want to find another Stefan doppelgänger. They perform a spell on Stefan as well as drain some blood. Elena continues to hallucinate and imagines Aaron being dead. Luke, Elena's 'friend' shows up and she almost turns him, but instead compels him to find Bonnie. Bonnie and Liv show up where Elena is unraveling and stabs her, telling her to drop the seal on the dorm. Damon shows up and gives her Stefan's blood and tells Elena about killing Aaron. Enzo shows up with the antidote for both of them. Caroline and Enzo volunteer to do what the Travelers want and kill the other doppelgänger, because they only want one alive. Luke shows up in Liv's dorm room, revealing they have ulterior motives behind everything (Liv already knows magic and Luke wasn't being compelled). At the end of the episode Elena and Damon both agree they're bad for each other, end things, but then they sleep together.
106	17	"Rescue Me"	Leslie Libman	Brett Matthews & Neil Reynolds	March 27, 2014	2J7517	1.73
A new Doppelgänger of Stefan Salvatore is introduced as Tom Avery, an EMT, and Caroline and Enzo are on their way to kill him in Atlanta. Elena goes to Parent-Teacher Conferences, but Damon shows up as his primary contact. Tom Avery disappeared, so the Travelers dig deeper in Stefan's mind for visions of him. Damon tells Elena he saw Jeremy with Liv at the Grill. Enzo and Caroline follow a lead to a witch named Hazel, but Enzo kills her. Her ghost shows up to Bonnie and gives her a message for Luke about hiding the doppelgänger. Caroline and Enzo find Tom Avery in the witches house, but Caroline can't find it in her to kill him and instead, she snaps Enzo's neck and leaves with Tom. Liv tries to kill Elena but is stopped by Damon. Caroline sets Tom free, but Enzo kills him to find the girl who was kind to him in captivity, Maggie. Damon tortures Liv into talking, saying the Travelers want there to be only one of each doppelgänger left. Jeremy, Matt and Tyler make a deal with her and Luke to spare Elena. Jeremy then moves out of Damon's house. At the camp, Caroline returns to the Travelers camp to get Stefan. The Travelers perform a ritual and go to the other side and their leader appears coming out from Bonnie.
107	18	"Resident Evil"	Paul Wesley	Brian Young & Caroline Dries	April 17, 2014	2J7518	1.66
Stefan and Elena start having dream/visions about alternate versions of themselves together, trying to draw them closer together. Damon finds this unsettling as do Elena and Stefan. Caroline's Mother and town folk have been possessed by the Travellers. Damon and Enzo find out that Markos (The Travellers Leader) is the cause for the visions. While Markos and Damon have little chat, Markos stops the visions. A passenger enters Tyler's body.
108	19	"Man on Fire"	Michael Allowitz	Melinda Hsu Taylor & Matthew D'Ambrosio	April 24, 2014	2J7519	1.81
Stefan helps Elena with their studies, distracting her from her entire situation with Damon. Bonnie is concerned as the destruction of the Other Side might affect her and her friends. Enzo continues to seek information about where to find his former girlfriend Maggie James, learning that she was killed by a vampire in 1960 much in the same way that Stefan does when he is in ripper mode. Enzo quickly accuses Stefan of the murder and threatens Luke so Liv will work for him. Enzo captures Elena, Bonnie and Stefan. Flashback to 1960, Stefan met Maggie, who is trying to find Damon to kill him. Enzo thinks back to when Maggie wanted to become a vampire to help him escape, but he tells her to leave and forget about him. Damon goes to rescue Stefan, Elena, and Bonnie by admitting he killed Maggie after she tried to kill him. Enzo then turns his humanity off, attacks Liv, then takes Elena. Elena escapes from Enzo and then Stefan kills him. The Travelers turn Sloan into a vampire, but then take away the magic keeping her as a vampire. She then dies, as Markos says he wants to make all of Mystic Falls magic free. Stefan doesn't let Damon know of Enzo's death.
109	20	"What Lies Beneath"	Joshua Butler	Elisabeth R. Finch & Holly Brix	May 1, 2014	2J7520	1.84
When Tyler turns up at the Salvatore house with the news that Markos' plan to break the witches' curse by draining Stefan and Elena's Blood, Damon suggests they hide out in the remote cabin once owned by Caroline's father and have Luke hide them with magic. Once there, it becomes obvious to Caroline that Stefan and Elena are keeping a secret, possible that they're back together, so Caroline comes up with a game designed to expose the truth. When Ghostly Enzo realizes he can physically interact with people in the real world, he quickly hopes for revenge. Matt and Jeremy takes charge of Tyler's plan to find out where Markos is from the Traveler inside him, and Bonnie continues to keep the truth about the Other Side from Jeremy, despite warnings from Grams.
110	21	"Promised Land"	Michael Allowitz	Rebecca Sonnenshine	May 8, 2014	2J7521	1.50
With the other side collapsing around them, everyone must work together to survive. With Stefan and Elena captured by Markos and being drained of blood, their saviour comes from an unlikely source. Enzo, who is determined to find a way back from the other side permanently, continues tormenting Bonnie to make her do the spell she's promised to bring him back, not knowing that she's lied and has no way of doing it. with the help of Jeremy and Matt, Damon takes and hides the bodies of all those who the travelers are occupying, trying to gain some leverage over Markos. This comes to no avail as Markos makes it clear that there are more travelers amongst them who they haven't yet seen. On their way back to Mystic Falls, Elena and Stefan are picked up by Maria. She reveals it was she who helped them escape. On entering the town, they are abruptly stopped by Liv and Luke who are determined to kill Elena or Stefan to stop the spell, killing Maria in the process. In a last ditch attempt to gain control of the situation, Damon releases Julian who is occupying Tyler's body, but it all comes too late. The spell to rid the world of all magic gets set into motion. Elena, Damon, and Stefan's daylight rings start to fail as does Liv and Luke's magic against them, giving them the opportunity to escape, and they take refuge to stay alive with the help of Matt. Everyone regroups to discuss ways to out run the spell in order to stay alive. Stefan and Caroline are left with Julian who is still occupying Tyler's body. Stefan breaks the news that Maria is dead and Julian, who is angry and determined to make someone pay, lashes out and rips Stefan's heart out killing him.
111	22	"Home"	Chris Grismer	Caroline Dries & Brian Young	May 15, 2014	2J7522	1.61
After the only traveler who would be willing to help them is sucked into oblivion, and with her the only chance of bringing Stefan back, Damon, Elena, Enzo, Bonnie and Caroline form a new plan for bringing back Stefan. Liv chants a resurrection spell after her brother has his neck snapped by Caroline while Matt and Jeremy cause a gas leak under the Mystic Grill. Bonnie and Enzo search for a dead traveler who resides on the other side, who turns out to be Silas. In order to bring back Stefan and Enzo, Bonnie agrees to help Silas to also return. Just as the plan comes together, oblivion starts claiming more souls, and Bonnie refuses to help Silas not be sucked away. Damon and Elena drive into the Mystic Grill, causing an explosion, killing every traveler gathered there. Bonnie waits in the woods for her Grams, who arrives and informs her that she will not pass through her as she has found peace by ensuring that Bonnie will find hers. Later, after Luke, Enzo, Tyler, Stefan and Elena have passed back through to the living, Luke tries to convince Liv to stop casting the spell. Tyler realizes that he is no longer a hybrid nor a triggered werewolf as he no longer heals. Lexi realizes that each passing weakens Bonnie further, reducing her chances of surviving to take Damon back to the living world and so after stopping Markos from travelling back through Bonnie, she disappears and finds peace. Alaric and Damon arrive and Bonnie pulls Alaric back through while Luke begins to perform a spell that counters Liv's spell, thus when Bonnie tries to help Damon though, she is unable to return him to the realm of the living. Bonnie reveals to Jeremy that there was never a way to save her and Damon says goodbye to Elena despite her not being able to hear him. Elena is heartbroken pleading Damon not to leave her alone. Damon says goodbye to Elena. Bonnie and Damon then stand looking into a bright white light holding hands.

== Production ==
=== Development ===
The series was renewed for a fifth season on February 11, 2013. The first writers meeting held on April 15, 2013. Filming began on July 10, 2013, and finished on April 10, 2014.

=== Casting ===
Within the first three episodes, four new characters were introduced: Nadia, a girl with a mission of revenge who has traveled around the world, Jesse, an upper-class boy who goes to college, Actors Olga Fonda and Kendrick Sampson were cast in the roles of Nadia and Jesse, respectively. On August 2, 2013, it was announced that Janina Gavankar would play Tessa.

== Reception ==
=== Critical response ===
Based on 13 reviews, the fifth season holds a 100% on Rotten Tomatoes with an average rating of 8.56 out of 10. The site's critics' consensus reads, "After a floundering fourth season, Vampire Diaries redeems itself with scorching twists that remind viewers that nothing is sacred."

=== Ratings ===
No.	Title	Air date	18–49 rating (Live + SD)	Viewers (millions) increase	Total 18–49 increase	Total viewers (millions)	Ref
1	"I Know What You Did Last Summer"	October 3, 2013	1.2	1.35	2.0	3.94	
5	"Monsters Ball"	October 31, 2013	0.9	1.53	1.7	3.67	
14	"No Exit"	February 27, 2014	0.9	1.35	1.5	3.74	
15	"Gone Girl"	March 6, 2014	1.0	1.31	1.6	'3.50'	
