= List of The Vampire Diaries episodes =

The Vampire Diaries is an American supernatural-fantasy horror television series. The series is based on a book series of the same name by L. J. Smith and was developed for television by Kevin Williamson and Julie Plec. The series ran from September 10, 2009, to March 10, 2017, on the CW. The first season was released on both DVD and Blu-ray formats in the United States and Canada on August 31, 2010.

The Vampire Diaries follows the life of Elena Gilbert (Nina Dobrev) who lives in Mystic Falls, a fictional town heavily charged with supernatural history. She falls for a handsome century-old vampire named Stefan Salvatore (Paul Wesley). Their lives grow more and more complicated as Stefan's vicious older vampire brother Damon Salvatore (Ian Somerhalder) also returns to town with a vendetta against his brother and the descendants of the town's founders. However, Damon quickly becomes their greatest ally in their fight against evil.

During the course of the series, 171 episodes of The Vampire Diaries aired over eight seasons.

== Series overview ==
Season	Episodes	Originally released	
Season	Episodes	First released	Last released
1	22	September 10, 2009	May 13, 2010
2	22	September 9, 2010	May 12, 2011
3	22	September 15, 2011	May 10, 2012
4	23	October 11, 2012	May 16, 2013
5	22	October 3, 2013	May 15, 2014
6	22	October 2, 2014	May 14, 2015
7	22	October 8, 2015	May 13, 2016
8	16	October 21, 2016	March 10, 2017

== Episodes ==
=== Season 1 (2009–10) ===
No. overall	No. in season	Title	Directed by	Written by	Original release date	Prod. code	U.S. viewers (millions)
1	1	"Pilot"	Marcos Siega	Teleplay by : Kevin Williamson & Julie Plec	September 10, 2009	296766	4.91
2	2	"The Night of the Comet"	Marcos Siega	Kevin Williamson & Julie Plec	September 17, 2009	2J5001	3.78
3	3	"Friday Night Bites"	John Dahl	Barbie Kligman & Bryan M. Holdman	September 24, 2009	2J5002	3.81
4	4	"Family Ties"	Guy Ferland	Andrew Kreisberg & Brian Young	October 1, 2009	2J5003	3.53
5	5	"You're Undead to Me"	Kevin Bray	Sean Reycraft & Gabrielle Stanton	October 8, 2009	2J5004	3.52
6	6	"Lost Girls"	Marcos Siega	Kevin Williamson & Julie Plec	October 15, 2009	2J5005	3.88
7	7	"Haunted"	Ernest Dickerson	Story by : Andrew Kreisberg; Teleplay by : Kevin Williamson & Julie Plec	October 29, 2009	2J5006	4.18
8	8	"162 Candles"	Rick Bota	Barbie Kligman & Gabrielle Stanton	November 5, 2009	2J5007	4.09
9	9	"History Repeating"	Marcos Siega	Bryan M. Holdman & Brian Young	November 12, 2009	2J5008	4.10
10	10	"The Turning Point"	J. Miller Tobin	Story by : Barbie Kligman; Teleplay by : Kevin Williamson & Julie Plec	November 19, 2009	2J5009	3.57
11	11	"Bloodlines"	David Barrett	Story by : Sean Reycraft; Teleplay by : Kevin Williamson & Julie Plec	January 21, 2010	2J5010	3.68
12	12	"Unpleasantville"	Liz Friedlander	Barbie Kligman & Brian Young	January 28, 2010	2J5011	3.71
13	13	"Children of the Damned"	Marcos Siega	Kevin Williamson & Julie Plec	February 4, 2010	2J5012	3.99
14	14	"Fool Me Once"	Marcos Siega	Brett Conrad	February 11, 2010	2J5013	3.51
15	15	"A Few Good Men"	Joshua Butler	Brian Young	March 25, 2010	2J5014	3.33
16	16	"There Goes the Neighborhood"	Kevin Bray	Bryan Oh & Andrew Chambliss	April 1, 2010	2J5015	2.80
17	17	"Let the Right One In"	Dennis Smith	Story by : Brian Young; Teleplay by : Julie Plec	April 8, 2010	2J5016	3.48
18	18	"Under Control"	David Von Ancken	Barbie Kligman & Andrew Chambliss	April 15, 2010	2J5017	3.15
19	19	"Miss Mystic Falls"	Marcos Siega	Bryan Oh & Caroline Dries	April 22, 2010	2J5018	3.33
20	20	"Blood Brothers"	Liz Friedlander	Kevin Williamson & Julie Plec	April 29, 2010	2J5019	3.39
21	21	"Isobel"	J. Miller Tobin	Caroline Dries & Brian Young	May 6, 2010	2J5020	3.31
22	22	"Founder's Day"	Marcos Siega	Bryan Oh & Andrew Chambliss	May 13, 2010	2J5021	3.47

=== Season 2 (2010–11) ===
No. overall	No. in season	Title	Directed by	Written by	Original release date	Prod. code	U.S. viewers (millions)
23	1	"The Return"	J. Miller Tobin	Kevin Williamson & Julie Plec	September 9, 2010	2J5251	3.28
24	2	"Brave New World"	John Dahl	Brian Young	September 16, 2010	2J5252	3.05
25	3	"Bad Moon Rising"	Patrick Norris	Andrew Chambliss	September 23, 2010	2J5253	3.57
26	4	"Memory Lane"	Rob Hardy	Caroline Dries	September 30, 2010	2J5254	3.18
27	5	"Kill or Be Killed"	Jeff Woolnough	Mike Daniels	October 7, 2010	2J5255	3.47
28	6	"Plan B"	John Behring	Elizabeth Craft & Sarah Fain	October 21, 2010	2J5256	3.62
29	7	"Masquerade"	Charles Beeson	Kevin Williamson & Julie Plec	October 28, 2010	2J5257	3.55
30	8	"Rose"	Liz Friedlander	Brian Young	November 4, 2010	2J5258	3.63
31	9	"Katerina"	J. Miller Tobin	Andrew Chambliss	November 11, 2010	2J5259	3.50
32	10	"The Sacrifice"	Ralph Hemecker	Caroline Dries	December 2, 2010	2J5260	3.46
33	11	"By the Light of the Moon"	Elizabeth Allen	Mike Daniels	December 9, 2010	2J5261	3.16
34	12	"The Descent"	Marcos Siega	Elizabeth Craft & Sarah Fain	January 27, 2011	2J5262	3.55
35	13	"Daddy Issues"	Joshua Butler	Kevin Williamson & Julie Plec	February 3, 2011	2J5263	3.22
36	14	"Crying Wolf"	David Von Ancken	Brian Young	February 10, 2011	2J5264	2.78
37	15	"The Dinner Party"	Marcos Siega	Andrew Chambliss	February 17, 2011	2J5265	3.07
38	16	"The House Guest"	Michael Katleman	Caroline Dries	February 24, 2011	2J5266	2.98
39	17	"Know Thy Enemy"	Wendey Stanzler	Mike Daniels	April 7, 2011	2J5267	2.73
40	18	"The Last Dance"	John Behring	Michael Narducci	April 14, 2011	2J5268	2.81
41	19	"Klaus"	Joshua Butler	Kevin Williamson & Julie Plec	April 21, 2011	2J5269	2.70
42	20	"The Last Day"	J. Miller Tobin	Andrew Chambliss & Brian Young	April 28, 2011	2J5270	2.68
43	21	"The Sun Also Rises"	Paul M. Sommers	Caroline Dries & Mike Daniels	May 5, 2011	2J5271	2.84
44	22	"As I Lay Dying"	John Behring	Turi Meyer & Al Septien & Michael Narducci	May 12, 2011	2J5272	2.86

=== Season 3 (2011–12) ===
No. overall	No. in season	Title	Directed by	Written by	Original release date	Prod. code	U.S. viewers (millions)
45	1	"The Birthday"	John Behring	Kevin Williamson & Julie Plec	September 15, 2011	2J6001	3.10
46	2	"The Hybrid"	Joshua Butler	Al Septien & Turi Meyer	September 22, 2011	2J6002	2.52
47	3	"The End of the Affair"	Chris Grismer	Caroline Dries	September 29, 2011	2J6003	2.74
48	4	"Disturbing Behavior"	Wendey Stanzler	Brian Young	October 6, 2011	2J6004	2.63
49	5	"The Reckoning"	John Behring	Michael Narducci	October 13, 2011	2J6005	2.89
50	6	"Smells Like Teen Spirit"	Rob Hardy	Julie Plec & Caroline Dries	October 20, 2011	2J6006	3.03
51	7	"Ghost World"	David Jackson	Rebecca Sonnenshine	October 27, 2011	2J6007	3.28
52	8	"Ordinary People"	J. Miller Tobin	Story by : Nick Wauters; Teleplay by : Julie Plec & Caroline Dries	November 3, 2011	2J6008	3.51
53	9	"Homecoming"	Joshua Butler	Evan Bleiweiss	November 10, 2011	2J6009	3.17
54	10	"The New Deal"	John Behring	Michael Narducci	January 5, 2012	2J6010	3.32
55	11	"Our Town"	Wendey Stanzler	Rebecca Sonnenshine	January 12, 2012	2J6011	2.86
56	12	"The Ties That Bind"	John Dahl	Brian Young	January 19, 2012	2J6012	2.71
57	13	"Bringing Out the Dead"	Jeffrey Hunt	Turi Meyer & Al Septien	February 2, 2012	2J6013	2.74
58	14	"Dangerous Liaisons"	Chris Grismer	Caroline Dries	February 9, 2012	2J6014	3.08
59	15	"All My Children"	Pascal Verschooris	Evan Bleiweiss & Michael Narducci	February 16, 2012	2J6015	2.90
60	16	"1912"	John Behring	Julie Plec & Elisabeth R. Finch	March 15, 2012	2J6016	2.64
61	17	"Break On Through"	Lance Anderson	Rebecca Sonnenshine	March 22, 2012	2J6017	2.69
62	18	"The Murder of One"	J. Miller Tobin	Caroline Dries	March 29, 2012	2J6018	2.44
63	19	"Heart of Darkness"	Chris Grismer	Brian Young & Evan Bleiweiss	April 19, 2012	2J6019	2.21
64	20	"Do Not Go Gentle"	Joshua Butler	Michael Narducci	April 26, 2012	2J6020	2.22
65	21	"Before Sunset"	Chris Grismer	Story by : Charlie Charbonneau & Daphne Miles; Teleplay by : Caroline Dries	May 3, 2012	2J6021	2.54
66	22	"The Departed"	John Behring	Story by : Brett Matthews & Elisabeth R. Finch; Teleplay by : Julie Plec	May 10, 2012	2J6022	2.53

=== Season 4 (2012–13) ===
No. overall	No. in season	Title	Directed by	Written by	Original release date	Prod. code	U.S. viewers (millions)
67	1	"Growing Pains"	Chris Grismer	Caroline Dries	October 11, 2012	2J6651	3.18
68	2	"Memorial"	Rob Hardy	Jose Molina & Julie Plec	October 18, 2012	2J6652	2.91
69	3	"The Rager"	Lance Anderson	Brian Young	October 25, 2012	2J6653	2.87
70	4	"The Five"	Joshua Butler	Brett Matthews & Rebecca Sonnenshine	November 1, 2012	2J6654	3.27
71	5	"The Killer"	Chris Grismer	Michael Narducci	November 8, 2012	2J6655	3.02
72	6	"We All Go a Little Mad Sometimes"	Wendey Stanzler	Evan Bleiweiss & Julie Plec	November 15, 2012	2J6656	2.84
73	7	"My Brother's Keeper"	Jeffrey Hunt	Caroline Dries & Elisabeth R. Finch	November 29, 2012	2J6657	2.86
74	8	"We'll Always Have Bourbon Street"	Jesse Warn	Charlie Charbonneau & Jose Molina	December 6, 2012	2J6658	2.42
75	9	"O Come, All Ye Faithful"	Pascal Verschooris	Michael J. Cinquemani & Julie Plec	December 13, 2012	2J6659	2.81
76	10	"After School Special"	David Von Ancken	Brett Matthews	January 17, 2013	2J6660	2.95
77	11	"Catch Me If You Can"	John Dahl	Brian Young & Michael Narducci	January 24, 2013	2J6661	2.71
78	12	"A View to a Kill"	Brad Turner	Rebecca Sonnenshine	January 31, 2013	2J6662	2.56
79	13	"Into the Wild"	Michael Allowitz	Caroline Dries	February 7, 2013	2J6663	2.50
80	14	"Down the Rabbit Hole"	Chris Grismer	Jose Molina	February 14, 2013	2J6664	2.31
81	15	"Stand by Me"	Lance Anderson	Julie Plec	February 21, 2013	2J6665	2.91
82	16	"Bring It On"	Jesse Warn	Elisabeth R. Finch & Michael Narducci	March 14, 2013	2J6666	2.41
83	17	"Because the Night"	Garreth Stover	Brian Young & Charlie Charbonneau	March 21, 2013	2J6667	2.65
84	18	"American Gothic"	Kellie Cyrus	Evan Bleiweiss & Jose Molina	March 28, 2013	2J6668	2.46
85	19	"Pictures of You"	J. Miller Tobin	Neil Reynolds & Caroline Dries	April 18, 2013	2J6669	2.14
86	20	"The Originals"	Chris Grismer	Julie Plec	April 25, 2013	2J6670	2.24
87	21	"She's Come Undone"	Darnell Martin	Michael Narducci & Rebecca Sonnenshine	May 2, 2013	2J6671	2.17
88	22	"The Walking Dead"	Rob Hardy	Brian Young & Caroline Dries	May 9, 2013	2J6672	2.28
89	23	"Graduation"	Chris Grismer	Caroline Dries & Julie Plec	May 16, 2013	2J6673	2.24

=== Season 5 (2013–14) ===
No. overall	No. in season	Title	Directed by	Written by	Original release date	Prod. code	U.S. viewers (millions)
90	1	"I Know What You Did Last Summer"	Lance Anderson	Caroline Dries	October 3, 2013	2J7501	2.59
91	2	"True Lies"	Joshua Butler	Brian Young	October 10, 2013	2J7502	2.14
92	3	"Original Sin"	Jesse Warn	Melinda Hsu Taylor & Rebecca Sonnenshine	October 17, 2013	2J7503	2.93
93	4	"For Whom the Bell Tolls"	Michael Allowitz	Brett Matthews & Elisabeth R. Finch	October 24, 2013	2J7504	2.63
94	5	"Monster's Ball"	Kellie Cyrus	Sonny Postiglione	October 31, 2013	2J7505	2.07
95	6	"Handle with Care"	Jeffrey Hunt	Caroline Dries & Holly Brix	November 7, 2013	2J7506	2.59
96	7	"Death and the Maiden"	Leslie Libman	Rebecca Sonnenshine	November 14, 2013	2J7507	2.72
97	8	"Dead Man on Campus"	Rob Hardy	Brian Young & Neil Reynolds	November 21, 2013	2J7508	2.67
98	9	"The Cell"	Chris Grismer	Melinda Hsu Taylor	December 5, 2013	2J7509	2.36
99	10	"Fifty Shades of Grayson"	Kellie Cyrus	Caroline Dries	December 12, 2013	2J7510	2.44
100	11	"500 Years of Solitude"	Chris Grismer	Julie Plec & Caroline Dries	January 23, 2014	2J7511	2.72
101	12	"The Devil Inside"	Kellie Cyrus	Brett Matthews & Sonny Postiglione	January 30, 2014	2J7512	2.42
102	13	"Total Eclipse of the Heart"	Darren Genet	Rebecca Sonnenshine & Holly Brix	February 6, 2014	2J7513	2.16
103	14	"No Exit"	Michael Allowitz	Brian Young	February 27, 2014	2J7514	2.03
104	15	"Gone Girl"	Lance Anderson	Melinda Hsu Taylor	March 6, 2014	2J7515	2.19
105	16	"While You Were Sleeping"	Pascal Verschooris	Caroline Dries	March 20, 2014	2J7516	2.28
106	17	"Rescue Me"	Leslie Libman	Brett Matthews & Neil Reynolds	March 27, 2014	2J7517	1.73
107	18	"Resident Evil"	Paul Wesley	Brian Young & Caroline Dries	April 17, 2014	2J7518	1.66
108	19	"Man on Fire"	Michael Allowitz	Melinda Hsu Taylor & Matthew D'Ambrosio	April 24, 2014	2J7519	1.81
109	20	"What Lies Beneath"	Joshua Butler	Elisabeth R. Finch & Holly Brix	May 1, 2014	2J7520	1.84
110	21	"Promised Land"	Michael Allowitz	Rebecca Sonnenshine	May 8, 2014	2J7521	1.50
111	22	"Home"	Chris Grismer	Caroline Dries & Brian Young	May 15, 2014	2J7522	1.61

=== Season 6 (2014–15) ===
No. overall	No. in season	Title	Directed by	Written by	Original release date	Prod. code	U.S. viewers (millions)
112	1	"I'll Remember"	Jeffrey Hunt	Caroline Dries	October 2, 2014	2J7851	1.81
113	2	"Yellow Ledbetter"	Pascal Verschooris	Julie Plec	October 9, 2014	2J7852	1.67
114	3	"Welcome to Paradise"	Michael Allowitz	Brian Young	October 16, 2014	2J7853	1.83
115	4	"Black Hole Sun"	Kellie Cyrus	Melinda Hsu Taylor & Neil Reynolds	October 23, 2014	2J7854	1.66
116	5	"The World Has Turned and Left Me Here"	Leslie Libman	Brett Matthews	October 30, 2014	2J7855	1.58
117	6	"The More You Ignore Me, the Closer I Get"	Garreth Stover	Chad Fiveash & James Stoteraux	November 6, 2014	2J7856	1.59
118	7	"Do You Remember the First Time?"	Darren Genet	Rebecca Sonnenshine	November 13, 2014	2J7857	1.54
119	8	"Fade Into You"	Joshua Butler	Nina Fiore & John Herrera	November 20, 2014	2J7858	1.68
120	9	"I Alone"	Kellie Cyrus	Brian Young & Holly Brix	December 4, 2014	2J7859	1.49
121	10	"Christmas Through Your Eyes"	Michael Allowitz	Caroline Dries	December 11, 2014	2J7860	1.82
122	11	"Woke Up with a Monster"	Paul Wesley	Melinda Hsu Taylor	January 22, 2015	2J7861	1.63
123	12	"Prayer for the Dying"	Jeffrey Hunt	Brett Matthews & Rebecca Sonnenshine	January 29, 2015	2J7862	1.47
124	13	"The Day I Tried to Live"	Pascal Verschooris	Chad Fiveash & James Stoteraux	February 5, 2015	2J7863	1.61
125	14	"Stay"	Chris Grismer	Brian Young & Caroline Dries	February 12, 2015	2J7864	1.52
126	15	"Let Her Go"	Julie Plec	Julie Plec	February 19, 2015	2J7865	1.41
127	16	"The Downward Spiral"	Ian Somerhalder	Brian Young & Caroline Dries	March 12, 2015	2J7866	1.30
128	17	"A Bird in a Gilded Cage"	Joshua Butler	Neil Reynolds	March 19, 2015	2J7867	1.59
129	18	"I Never Could Love Like That"	Leslie Libman	Story by : Matthew D'Ambrosio; Teleplay by : Chad Fiveash & James Storeaux	April 16, 2015	2J7868	1.35
130	19	"Because"	Geoffrey Wing Shotz	Melinda Hsu Taylor	April 23, 2015	2J7869	1.37
131	20	"I'd Leave My Happy Home for You"	Jesse Warn	Brett Matthews & Rebecca Sonnenshine	April 30, 2015	2J7870	1.21
132	21	"I'll Wed You in the Golden Summertime"	Michael Allowitz	Brian Young	May 7, 2015	2J7871	1.32
133	22	"I'm Thinking of You All the While"	Chris Grismer	Julie Plec & Caroline Dries	May 14, 2015	2J7872	1.44

=== Season 7 (2015–16) ===
No. overall	No. in season	Title	Directed by	Written by	Original release date	Prod. code	U.S. viewers (millions)
134	1	"Day One of Twenty-Two Thousand, Give or Take"	Pascal Verschooris	Caroline Dries	October 8, 2015	3J5701	1.38
135	2	"Never Let Me Go"	Chris Grismer	Brian Young	October 15, 2015	3J5702	1.40
136	3	"Age of Innocence"	Michael Allowitz	Melinda Hsu Taylor & Holly Brix	October 22, 2015	3J5703	1.20
137	4	"I Carry Your Heart with Me"	Jeffrey Hunt	Neil Reynolds	October 29, 2015	3J5704	1.24
138	5	"Live Through This"	Kellie Cyrus	Rebecca Sonnenshine	November 5, 2015	3J5705	1.34
139	6	"Best Served Cold"	Darren Genet	Caroline Dries	November 12, 2015	3J5706	1.32
140	7	"Mommie Dearest"	Tony Solomons	Chad Fiveash & James Stoteraux	November 19, 2015	3J5707	1.10
141	8	"Hold Me, Thrill Me, Kiss Me, Kill Me"	Leslie Libman	Brett Matthews	December 3, 2015	3J5708	1.31
142	9	"Cold as Ice"	Geoffrey Wing Shotz	Brian Young	December 10, 2015	3J5709	1.18
143	10	"Hell Is Other People"	Deborah Chow	Holly Brix & Neil Reynolds	January 29, 2016	3J5710	1.23
144	11	"Things We Lost in the Fire"	Paul Wesley	Melinda Hsu Taylor	February 5, 2016	3J5711	1.09
145	12	"Postcards from the Edge"	Pascal Verschooris	Rebecca Sonnenshine	February 12, 2016	3J5712	1.05
146	13	"This Woman's Work"	Garreth Stover	Chad Fiveash & James Stoteraux	February 19, 2016	3J5713	1.01
147	14	"Moonlight on the Bayou"	Jeffrey Hunt	Caroline Dries & Brett Matthews	February 26, 2016	3J5714	1.12
148	15	"I Would for You"	Mike Karasick	Brian Young	March 4, 2016	3J5715	1.06
149	16	"Days of Future Past"	Ian Somerhalder	Melinda Hsu Taylor	April 1, 2016	3J5716	1.07
150	17	"I Went to the Woods"	Julie Plec	Story by : Julie Plec & Neil Reynolds; Teleplay by : Neil Reynolds	April 8, 2016	3J5717	1.03
151	18	"One Way or Another"	Rashaad Ernesto Green	Story by : Penny Cox; Teleplay by : Rebecca Sonnenshine	April 15, 2016	3J5718	1.02
152	19	"Somebody That I Used to Know"	Chris Grismer	Story by : Matthew D'Ambrosio; Teleplay by : Holly Brix	April 22, 2016	3J5719	1.02
153	20	"Kill 'Em All"	Kellie Cyrus	Chad Fiveash & James Stoteraux	April 29, 2016	3J5720	1.05
154	21	"Requiem for a Dream"	Paul Wesley	Brett Matthews & Neil Reynolds	May 6, 2016	3J5721	0.90
155	22	"Gods and Monsters"	Michael A. Allowitz	Brian Young	May 13, 2016	3J5722	1.04

=== Season 8 (2016–17) ===
No. overall	No. in season	Title	Directed by	Written by	Original release date	Prod. code	U.S. viewers (millions)
156	1	"Hello, Brother"	Michael A. Allowitz	Julie Plec & Kevin Williamson	October 21, 2016	T27.13301	0.98
157	2	"Today Will Be Different"	Pascal Verschooris	Melinda Hsu Taylor	October 28, 2016	T27.13302	0.90
158	3	"You Decided That I Was Worth Saving"	Michael Karasick	Chad Fiveash & James Stoteraux	November 4, 2016	T27.13303	0.94
159	4	"An Eternity of Misery"	Rob Hardy	Brett Matthews & Neil Reynolds	November 11, 2016	T27.13304	1.00
160	5	"Coming Home Was a Mistake"	James Thompson	Celine Geiger	November 18, 2016	T27.13305	0.92
161	6	"Detoured on Some Random Backwoods Path to Hell"	Paul Wesley	Alan McElroy	December 2, 2016	T27.13306	1.05
162	7	"The Next Time I Hurt Somebody, It Could Be You"	Tanya Hamilton	Shukree Hassan Tilghman	December 9, 2016	T27.13307	0.98
163	8	"We Have History Together"	Ian Somerhalder	Matthew D'Ambrosio	January 13, 2017	T27.13308	0.95
164	9	"The Simple Intimacy of the Near Touch"	Geoff Shotz	Neil Reynolds & Penny Cox	January 20, 2017	T27.13309	0.86
165	10	"Nostalgia's a Bitch"	Kellie Cyrus	Brett Matthews	January 27, 2017	T27.13310	0.94
166	11	"You Made a Choice to Be Good"	Carol Banker	Melinda Hsu Taylor & Celine Geiger	February 3, 2017	T27.13311	0.92
167	12	"What Are You?"	Darren Genet	Chad Fiveash & James Stoteraux	February 10, 2017	T27.13312	1.11
168	13	"The Lies Will Catch Up to You"	Tony Solomons	Neil Reynolds	February 17, 2017	T27.13313	0.99
169	14	"It's Been a Hell of a Ride"	Pascal Verschooris	Brett Matthews & Shukree Hassan Tilghman	February 24, 2017	T27.13314	1.04
170	15	"We're Planning a June Wedding"	Chris Grismer	Story by : Jen Vestuto & Melissa Marlette; Teleplay by : Melinda Hsu Taylor	March 3, 2017	T27.13315	1.14
171	16	"I Was Feeling Epic"	Julie Plec	Julie Plec & Kevin Williamson	March 10, 2017	T27.13316	1.15

== Special ==
No.	Title	Aired between	Original release date	US viewers (millions)
1	"Forever Yours"	"We're Planning a June Wedding" "I Was Feeling Epic"	March 10, 2017	1.07
Retrospective of the series featuring interviews with past and present cast members and guest stars, a conversation with the executive producers, Julie Plec and Kevin Williamson, behind-the-scenes footage from the final season and special moments from the past eight years.

== Ratings ==
The Vampire Diaries : U.S. viewers per episode (millions)

Season	Episode number																							Average
Season	1	2	3	4	5	6	7	8	9	10	11	12	13	14	15	16	17	18	19	20	21	22	23	Average
1	4.91	3.78	3.81	3.53	3.52	3.88	4.18	4.09	4.10	3.57	3.68	3.71	3.99	3.51	3.33	2.80	3.48	3.15	3.33	3.39	3.31	3.47	–	3.66
2	3.28	3.05	3.57	3.18	3.47	3.62	3.55	3.63	3.50	3.46	3.16	3.55	3.22	2.78	3.07	2.98	2.73	2.81	2.70	2.68	2.84	2.86	–	3.17
3	3.10	2.52	2.74	2.63	2.89	3.03	3.28	3.51	3.17	3.32	2.86	2.71	2.74	3.08	2.90	2.64	2.69	2.44	2.21	2.22	2.54	2.53	–	2.81
4	3.18	2.91	2.87	3.27	3.02	2.84	2.42	2.81	2.95	2.71	2.71	2.56	2.50	2.31	2.91	2.41	2.65	2.46	2.14	2.24	2.17	2.28	2.24	2.64
5	2.59	2.14	2.93	2.63	2.07	2.59	2.72	2.67	2.36	2.44	2.72	2.42	2.16	2.03	2.19	2.28	1.73	1.66	1.81	1.84	1.50	1.61	–	2.23
6	1.81	1.67	1.83	1.66	1.58	1.59	1.54	1.68	1.49	1.82	1.63	1.47	1.61	1.52	1.41	1.30	1.59	1.35	1.37	1.21	1.32	1.44	–	1.54
7	1.38	1.40	1.20	1.24	1.34	1.32	1.10	1.31	1.18	1.23	1.09	1.05	1.01	1.12	1.06	1.07	1.03	1.02	1.02	1.05	0.90	1.04	–	1.14
8	0.98	0.90	0.94	1.00	0.92	1.05	0.98	0.95	0.86	0.94	0.92	1.11	0.99	1.04	1.14	1.15	–							0.99

Audience measurement performed by Nielsen Media Research
