= Rescue Me (The Vampire Diaries) =

- The Vampire Diaries episode
- Episode no.: Season 5 Episode 17
- Directed by: Leslie Libman
- Written by: Brett Matthews; Neil Reynolds
- Production code: 2J7517
- Original air date: March 27, 2014

Guest appearances
- Michael Malarkey (Enzo); Raffi Barsoumian (Markos); Caitlin McHugh (Sloan); Penelope Mitchell (Liv Parker); Chris Brochu (Luke Parker)

Episode chronology
← Previous "While You Were Sleeping"	Next → "Resident Evil"
- The Vampire Diaries season 5

"Rescue Me" is the 17th episode of the fifth season of the American series The Vampire Diaries and the series' 106th episode overall. "Rescue Me" was originally aired on March 27, 2014, on The CW. The episode was written by Brett Matthews and Neil Reynolds and directed by Leslie Libman.

== Plot ==
The episode starts with Stefan (Paul Wesley) having a vision of Tom saving a woman's life during a spell that Sloan (Caitlin McHugh) casts in order to link Stefan to Tom so they will find him. From the spell, Stefan can "see" that Tom works at the Atlanta Metropolitan Hospital, something that will help Caroline (Candice Accola) and Enzo (Michael Malarkey) find Tom easier and kill him.

Elena (Nina Dobrev) wakes up next to Damon (Ian Somerhalder) after their break-up sex. She realizes that it is Jeremy's (Steven R. McQueen) parent-teacher conference and she tries to sneak out without waking up Damon. Damon though is already awake and Elena reassures him that they are still broken up and what happened the previous night was a mistake before she leaves.

Caroline and Enzo are already in Atlanta trying to find Tom when Sloan calls to tell them that the person's name they are looking for is Tom and where he works. Caroline gets mad at Sloan because she broke their deal and used Stefan again to link him to Tom, something that could lead Stefan to lose his memories. Sloan makes it clear that she does not care about Stefan's brain but about his blood and she reminds Caroline that as long as Tom is alive, Stefan and Elena's blood is useless to her. She threatens Stefan's life if Caroline fails to kill Tom.

At Mystic Grill, Damon tries to get over his breakup with Elena by drinking while Matt (Zach Roerig) and Tyler (Michael Trevino) see him and figure out that something is wrong between him and Elena. The three of them talk when Liv (Penelope Mitchell) walks into the bar and meets with Jeremy. They are surprised seeing them together, Damon leaves and Tyler tries to hear what Liv and Jeremy talk about but he cannot hear anything.

Elena is on the phone with Bonnie (Kat Graham) while waiting in the line to the guidance counselor at Jeremy's school and tells her about her break up with Damon. They also realize that Jeremy was neither home or with Bonnie and they wonder where he was. Elena has to hang up because it is her turn to go to the guidance counselor while Bonnie spots Luke (Chris Brochu) sitting across the room. The counselor informs Elena that she is not Jeremy's primary contact when Damon appears and tells her that she asked him to take care of Jeremy while she was at Whitmore. The two of them spend the day together attending classes and with Damon trying to make her change her mind about their breakup.

Back in Atlanta, Caroline and Enzo find the hospital where Tom works but a doctor informs them that Tom has been missing for four months and no one knows where he is. Caroline calls Sloan and asks to talk to Stefan because their info was bad and they could not find Tom. She asks Stefan if he remembers any small details from his vision that could help them but he does not, so Sloan stars a new spell on Stefan despite Caroline's warnings not to. Stefan sees Tom talking to a girl named Hazel (Gena Shaw), who asks him to buy him dinner for saving her friend's life and Tom accepts. Hazel gives him the address and Stefan is able to tell the address to Caroline.

Caroline and Enzo find the address and Hazel but they cannot get into the house if someone does not invite them in. They see Hazel in a trance and they realize that she is a witch. Enzo kills her so they can enter the house. They find Tom in a coma and realize that Hazel was keeping him in that state to hide him for the last four months. Caroline wakes him and while she has to kill him, she instead snaps Enzo's neck and tells Tom that she is there to save him. The two of them go for a lunch where Caroline compels Tom to tell her everything about his life and she learns how Hazel kidnapped him. On their way back to the car, Enzo appears and kills Tom.

In the meantime, at the Whitmore Bonnie talks to Luke when Hazel appears to pass through the anchor. Hazel asks Bonnie to inform Luke that she failed before she passes and Bonnie, confused, asks Luke about Hazel and to tell her the truth. Luke admits that he is Liv's twin brother and witch and that they were trying to keep the travelers away from Tom and that he and his sister are trying to find out why the travelers need Elena and Stefan's blood.

Back at the Mystic Grill, Liv tells Jeremy that she needs his help to fight the travelers since he is a hunter and they cannot control his mind. She tells him some more details about the travelers and asks his help again so they can find why they need the blood of Elena and Stefan. While talking, Liv gets a text from Luke who informs her about Hazel and she leaves in a hurry. Jeremy calls Bonnie to ask about Elena and when Bonnie tells him that she is at school, he says that Elena might be in danger.

Liv finds Elena at school and attacks her. Liv and her coven did everything they could to protect her but since now she is dangerous they have to kill her. Damon gets there in time and stops her. Damon ties her and threatens to kill her if she will not tell him what she wants. Liv says that now that there is only one male doppelganger, the travelers will come for Elena to use her. Jeremy arrives and asks Damon to free Liv because she knows more than she admits about the travelers and that he will not let her hurt Elena. Damon unwillingly does it because Elena says that she trusts her brother.

Caroline goes back to the traveler's camp and tells Stefan what happened and realizes that Stefan let her go on purpose knowing that she would never hurt Tom or anyone because that's just who she is.

At the Salvatore house, Elena tells Damon that she will go back to Whitmore and that they should stay away from each other because they are bad for each other. Jeremy joins them just to inform them that he will move in with Tyler and Matt. Elena tries to change his mind but when she realizes that he took his decision she lets him leave.

Caroline and Stefan are sleeping back at the traveler's camp but wake up when they hear the travelers changing and walk there to investigate what is going on. They watch the travelers drink Elena and Stefan's blood and then Sloan sets one of them on fire, something that leads everyone to burn since they are linked. They all die and Stefan and Caroline run away not knowing what the ritual was about.

The episode ends with the dead travelers appear at Whitmore where Bonnie is and they pass through her. Bonnie tries to get away from them because they are too many and the pain is unbearable but she cannot. After the last traveler passes through her, Bonnie collapses and a man comes from the Other Side through her to the outside world.

== Feature music ==
In the "Rescue Me" episode we can hear the songs:

- "Girls Chase Boys" by Ingrid Michaelson
- "Do I Wanna Know?" by Arctic Monkeys
- "Weekend warrior" by Eytan and The Embassy
- "Shake" by The Head and the Heart
- "Far From Yesterday" by Amy Stroup
- "Walking Backwards" by Leagues

== Reception ==
=== Ratings ===
In its original American broadcast, "Rescue Me" was watched by 1.73 million; down by 0.55 from the previous episode.

=== Reviews ===
"Rescue Me" received good reviews.

Stephanie Flasher from TV After Dark gave an A− rating to the episode saying: "All in all, this was a good episode of The Vampire Diaries and too bad we have to struggle through another hiatus."

Carrie Raisler of The A.V. Club gave a B− rating to the episode saying that "the entire episode is basically the setup to get him [Markos] to Mystic Falls, using the blood of the last two doppelgangers to do so."

Ashley Dominique from Geeked Out Nation gave a B rating to the episode stating the positive and the negative things about the episode. As bottom line she says: ""Rescue me" was filled with more whining and bickering than one would have liked and a lot of circling about what the travelers where up to. In the end, we learned it was up to no good."

Caroline Preece from Den of Geek gave a positive review to the episode commenting on a possible new love triangle between Stefan, Caroline and Enzo. "There’s certainly room for someone like that in The Vampire Diaries, evident in the gradually lessening body count of the last few seasons, and the emerging love triangle between Caroline, Stefan and Enzo, despite being yet another love triangle, feels fresher than any of the revolving love connections the show is currently dealing with."

Stephanie Hall from KSiteTV gave a good review to the episode saying that it was an emotionally powerful episode for almost every character. "t hearkened back to the good ole days when these characters’ internal problems drove the dramatic world in which they lived, instead of them being on defense against a big bad force. [...] As a whole, I am quite fond of "Rescue Me""

Leigh Raines of TV Fanatic rated the episode with 4/5, same as Rebecca Serle from Vulture saying that it was a good episode and "she had a blast" with it.
