= What Lies Beneath (The Vampire Diaries) =

- The Vampire Diaries episode
- Episode no.: Season 5 Episode 20
- Directed by: Joshua Butler
- Written by: Elisabeth R. Finch; Holly Brix
- Production code: 2J7520
- Original air date: May 1, 2014

Guest appearances
- Michael Malarkey (Enzo); Raffi Barsoumian (Markos); Chris Brochu (Luke Parker)

Episode chronology
← Previous "Man on Fire"	Next → "Promised Land"
- The Vampire Diaries season 5

"What Lies Beneath" is the 20th episode of the fifth season of the American series The Vampire Diaries and the series' 109th episode overall. "What Lies Beneath" was originally aired on May 1, 2014, on The CW. The episode was written by Elisabeth R. Finch and Holly Brix and directed by Joshua Butler.

== Plot ==
The episode starts with Tyler (Michael Trevino) waking up on the Traveler's camp where he finds himself chained up. Maria (Tamara Austin), Julian's wife, the traveler who is inside his body, is with him and kisses him, believing he is Julian. Tyler pretends to be him so he can find out what is going on. He then hears Maria saying that Markos (Raffi Barsoumian) found a way to remove the magic from Mystic Falls and that he is now on the search for the doppelgangers. Tyler shifts and runs to the Salvatore house to tell them Markos' plan.

At the Salvatore house, Damon (Ian Somerhalder) tries to locate Enzo (Michael Malarkey) with the help of Luke (Chris Brochu) to no avail. Stefan (Paul Wesley) joins them and tries to convince Damon to stop looking for Enzo, because the reason Luke cannot find him is probably because Enzo does not want to be found. Tyler interrupts them to tell them Markos' plans and that he is after the doppelgangers, so Damon and Stefan decide to go with Elena (Nina Dobrev), Caroline (Candice Accola) and Luke at a place where Luke will cloak them with a spell and Markos will not be able to find them.

The four of them along with Luke go to Caroline's father's cabin in the woods to hide. Luke works on the spell while Caroline sees Elena and Stefan acting weird and she thinks that the two of them are back together and want to hide it, but the thing they are hiding is Enzo's death. Caroline plans a game night where she hopes to make them admit they are back together. Damon agrees, since he can also see the way they act and also believes they hide something, but not a romantic relationship. At the same time, Enzo's ghost is at the cabin and wants to make sure that Damon will find out about his death.

In the meantime, Bonnie (Kat Graham) and Jeremy (Steven R. McQueen) try to have a romantic weekend with just the two of them, but Jeremy gets a text from Matt (Zach Roerig) and they have to go home. Jeremy leaves and Bonnie's grandmother, Sheila (Jasmine Guy), appears to her, warning her that she has to tell Jeremy the truth about the Other Side falling apart and not giving him hope that she will find a way to stay alive. While they talk, Sheila knocks over a lamp, something a ghost should not be able to do.

The games at the Forbes' cabin start and Damon suggests to play "Never Have I Ever" where Caroline takes the opportunity to "ask" if Elena and Stefan are back together while Damon asks about where Enzo really is. Things get awkward, Stefan does not answer the question and keeps saying that he did not lie about Enzo, while Elena prefers to leave and go take a bath. Enzo follows her and when she gets into the tub, he pushes her under the water. Elena tries to get on top. At the brief moment she does, she manages to shout out to Damon, who rushes into the bathroom but cannot see anyone. Elena tells him that someone was pushing her under the water, but she couldn't see anyone. Damon believes that it's the ghost of Caroline's father, but doesn't understand why he would try to hurt Elena, so she finally tells him the truth about Enzo.

In the meantime, Stefan calls Bonnie to ask if people from the other side can interact with the real world and Bonnie tells him about Sheila. Caroline overhears their conversation and also now knows that Enzo is dead. They all try to figure out why Enzo would try to drown Elena, since something like that would not work and they realize it was just a distraction. They rush outside to find Luke, but he is gone, neaning he is no longer protecting them with the clogging spell and travelers can find them. They split up to find Luke and leave the cabin. Caroline and Damon are mad at Elena and Stefan respectively for not telling them about Enzo.

Stefan and Damon find Luke tied up in the barn. As they try to untie him, Enzo sets the barn on fire and stakes Stefan in the back. Then he does the same to Damon and wants to keep them there so they will burn. Stefan manages to remove the stake and Damon forces him to take Luke and get out of the burning barn, while he tries to convince Enzo that he will find a way to bring him back to life since they did it in the past with Jeremy and Bonnie. Enzo frees him and Damon gets out before he gets burned.

Meanwhile, Matt, Tyler and Jeremy want to find out where Markos is. The only way to find that out is to ask the traveler who is inside Tyler body. They tied Tyler up and call Julian. Julian takes over but he does not want to tell them anything. He changes his mind when Matt and Jeremy start to torture him and he tells them that he doesn't know where Markos is, but he knows that Markos does not like troubles, so he will probably go on to make him permanent in Tyler's body. The only way to prevent that is for Jeremy and Matt to go and get Julian's body from where the travelers hide them when they possess others.

Jeremy and Bonnie go to where Julian told them and start to be searching for his body amongst the others. While they are searching, Maria appears with other travelers and they get Julian's body, so Jeremy and Bonnie have to go back home without it. They try to explain to Tyler what happened when he starts seeing things and is in pain. At the same time, the travelers burn Julian's body and chant, indicating that they started the spell for making Julian permanent in Tyler's body. Julian takes over again saying: "I assume you did not find my body" while everyone looks at him terrified to the idea that Tyler is gone for ever.

The episode ends at the Forbes cabin, where Damon, Stefan, Elena, Caroline and Luke prepare to leave but the travelers have already found them and they manage to capture Elena and Stefan.

== Feature music ==
In the "What Lies Beneath" episode we can hear the songs:

- "Chemical" by Kerli
- "River" by together PANGEA
- "Turn It Around" by Lucius

== Reception ==
=== Ratings ===
In its original American broadcast, "What Lies Beneath" was watched by 1.84 million; slightly up by 0.03 from the previous episode.

=== Reviews ===
"What Lies Beneath" received positive reviews.

Ashley Dominique of Geeked Out Nation gave the episode an A− rating. "In "What Lies Beneath" our crew did everything they possibly could to rival against the travelers, while dealing with Enzo's ghost doing it's [sic] best to kill them all."

Stephanie Flasher from TV After Dark gave the episode a B+ rating saying: "Overall, this episode was quite entertaining. It had a nice story that was amusing yet had an climatic build up to keep the audience engaged."

LaToya Ferguson of The A.V. Club gave the episode a B rating. "There are a couple of things TVD can do that will make me forget all of my worries about the show. When the show goes back to its horror roots, it’s easy to momentarily forget all the bad that has been going on. Also, put any of these characters in cabin, and I’m predisposed to not hate the episode. Luckily, “What Lies Beneath” does both these things and is a better episode for it."

Matt Richenthall from TV Fanatic rated the episode with 3.4/5. "This outing did a solid job furthering Caroline's obvious crush on Stefan; evolving Damon as someone worthy of being loved; and scaring the crap out of anyone who enjoys a good ghost story." Richenthal also commented on the villain Markos and the Travelers stating that they are boring: "A series such as TVD needs a strong villain - and Markos is a complete snooze. He has no personality. He hasn't done anything remotely frightening. He's simply existing in the show's universe and saying he wants his people to have a home."

Caroline Preece of Den of Geek gave a good review to the episode saying that the show is built in secrets. "This week’s episode was an episode that addressed these secrets and, as a handy by-product, actually provided some relief to the audience." Preece also comments on the love triangle between Stefan, Elena and Damon and the possibility of something new to start between Stefan and Caroline: "I admire the show’s restraint with [the love triangle], having another pairing develop over multiple seasons while we were all distracted with the ‘epic-ness’ of the central trio’s dysfunction. I like it, and look forward to seeing it play out."

Josie Kafka from Doux Reviews gave a positive review to the episode saying that there was nothing particularly wrong with it. "The most interesting parts of this episode were the emotional beats. Elena and Stefan seem to have a solid friendship in the works, which is a nice change from the awkwardness of months past. Caroline’s sudden jealousy didn’t seem too sudden: Candice Accola did a good job of conveying Caroline’s confused reactions to her own surprising interest in Stefan. Is that a love-interest, or just Caroline struggling to find somebody to love? By TVD standards, she has been single for a very, very long time."

Stephanie Hall of K Site TV also gave good review to the episode saying that it was an episode of hidden truths. ""What Lies Beneath" tapped into the relatable character drama that made The Vampire Diaries an initial success and used the grand mythology to enhance the otherwise seemingly simple stakes that several of the characters were facing."

== Notes ==
- The episode takes its title from the 2000 movie What Lies Beneath.
