= Promised Land (The Vampire Diaries) =

- The Vampire Diaries episode
- Episode no.: Season 5 Episode 21
- Directed by: Michael Allowitz
- Written by: Rebecca Sonnenshine
- Production code: 2J7521
- Original air date: May 8, 2014

Guest appearances
- Michael Malarkey (Enzo); Raffi Barsoumian (Markos); Penelope Mitchell (Liv Parker); Chris Brochu (Luke Parker)

Episode chronology
← Previous "What Lies Beneath"	Next → "Home"
- The Vampire Diaries season 5

"Promised Land" is the 21st episode of the fifth season of the American series The Vampire Diaries and the series' 110th episode overall. "Promised Land" was originally aired on May 8, 2014, on The CW. The episode was written by Rebecca Sonnenshine and directed by Michael Allowitz.

== Plot ==
Damon (Ian Somerhalder) has captured a traveler and interrogates him to tell him where Markos (Raffi Barsoumian) is, so he can find Stefan (Paul Wesley) and Elena (Nina Dobrev). However, the only thing the traveler tells him is, that it doesn't matter if he finds Markos, since he has whatever he needs and it's too late to do anything. Meanwhile, Stefan and Elena are tied up and being drained by Markos, who needs their blood for his spell. A woman appears and frees Stefan, who goes and frees Elena and they escape.

Stefan calls Damon to tell him that they escaped but he does not know where they are and that they will try to find their way back home safe. They are walking down the road discussing when a car appears. The driver turns out to be Maria (Tamara Austin), one of the travelers, but also the one who freed Stefan. She picks them up. Elena and Stefan wonder why she is helping them and Maria tells them that her husband, Julian, is inside Tyler's (Michael Trevino) body permanently. That means when Markos finishes the spell, Julian will die, since Tyler's body is a hybrid. She wants to find her husband and run away.

Enzo (Michael Malarkey) keeps bothering Damon to keep his promise and bring him back to life. He also pesters Bonnie (Kat Graham), since she is the one who is able to do it. Bonnie asks Damon to make Enzo stop, but instead he tells her that since she is working on a spell with Liv (Penelope Mitchell) to keep her alive when the Other Side collapses, they should include Enzo to the spell as well and save him too.

Caroline (Candice Accola) comes to Bonnie with an idea of how to save Tyler: they can kill his body so the traveler will go, Tyler passes to the Other Side and then they bring him back with the spell that will also bring Bonnie back. Bonnie cannot lie anymore and admits to Caroline that there is no spell and that she lied about it, something that Enzo also hears and is mad about. He demands from Bonnie to find a way and when she tells him to give up he says he will never give up as long as the Other Side still exists and he is there.

Meanwhile, Damon tries to make Markos appear, so he steals all the travelers' bodies from the cave, leaving a note to Markos to come find him. Markos then comes to the Salvatore house, where he explains his plan to Damon and tells him threatening to destroy the bodies will not work, since the bodies are not essential to his plan. To prove this, he kills one of the travelers. Damon tries to attack him but Markos knocks him out. He tells him that he is not strong enough to kill him, since he is full of doppelganger blood and he channels the power of all the travelers. Julian, who is chained at the basement, hears the two talking and tells Damon that Markos does not know he is there and they should take advantage of that.

Elena, Stefan and Maria arrive at Mystic Falls but Liv and Luke (Chris Brochu) ambush them and cause their car to crush by using magic. Maria dies and Elena and Stefan try to get away from them. Liv and Luke want to kill at least one of them so the travelers will not be able to complete the spell that will strip away all the magic from Mystic Falls. In the meantime, the travelers started the spell and Liv and Luke start losing their magic power. Elena and Stefan's rings also stop working and they start getting burned by the sun. They run and hide to avoid the sun and head to find Damon, Caroline and the rest. Maria's spirit appears to Bonnie to pass to the other side and asks Bonnie to tell Julian that she tried to save him.

Back at the Salvatore house, Julian tries to help Damon to take Markos by surprise and attacks him by biting him. Markos pushes him away while Julian's fangs disappear because of the spell that the travelers already started. Damon's ring stops working as well and the wound of the gunshot that killed him appears on his chest. Damon and Julian run away to get out of the range of the spell so they will not die.

Caroline tries to pack their things and leave the dorm. While Bonnie should be doing the same, she just sits without doing anything. Caroline asks her why she is not helping and Bonnie says that she might have found a way to bring them back to life but she needs Enzo's help. Enzo finds Maria at the Other Side and he asks her if she knows the spell that the travelers used to bring Markos back. Maria says she does and is willing to help them, but with the Other Side falling apart, Maria is drawn away by the force that draws away the people from the Other Side. Enzo and Bonnie lose their only chance to manage to bring the ones they need back into life.

Jeremy (Steven R. McQueen) finds Damon running in the street and picks him up. They go and find Stefan, Elena, Caroline and Matt (Zach Roerig). Matt and Jeremy decid to go back to Mystic Falls while the rest should try to get as far away as they can. Damon and Elena leave with Jeremy's car while Stefan and Caroline stay behind to wait for Bonnie. Julian appears and asks about Maria. Stefan tells him that Maria is dead, and Julian starts a fight with Stefan where he ends up killing him by ripping his heart out. Julian says that that is the way to stop the spell and leaves, while Caroline is in shock crying over Stefan's body.

The episode ends with Stefan appearing to Bonnie so he can pass to the Other Side. Bonnie is aghast seeing him and cannot believe he is dead. Stefan asks her if she found a way to bring them all back. Bonnie tells him she did, but lost it and then Stefan passes through her to the Other Side.

== Feature music ==
In the "Promised Land" episode we can hear the songs:

- "Don't Let Me Go" by Raign
- "I'll Be Honest" by The Privates
- "Future Bolt" by Hotpipes
- "Bad Blood" by Bastille
- "Cherry Licorice" by The Felice Brothers
- "The Truth in You" by The Garden District
- "Torture" by Rival Sons

== Reception ==
=== Ratings ===
In its original American broadcast, "Promised Land" was watched by 1.50 million; down by 0.34 from the previous episode.

=== Reviews ===
"Promised Land" received positive reviews.

Stephanie Flasher of TV After Dark gave an A rating to the episode saying that "despite being the season's penultimate episode, "Promised Land" very much had the feeling of a season finale with drama, suspense and an epic cliffhanger."

Ashley Dominique from Geeked Out Nation gave an A− rating to the episode. "The stakes got grave and desperate as the travelers took hold of Mystic Falls in "Promised Land". All of this setting up an extremely tension filled finale."

Carrie Raisler of The A.V. Club gave the episode a B+ rating focusing on Stefan's death and saying: "It hurts me to spend all that time debating something that only took up about one minute of actual episode space—especially because everything else here was so good. This episode was downright hilarious at times, light and breezy and snappy in a way the show hasn’t been in quite a while, and it was an absolute pleasure to watch. [...] It’s well-plotted, well-written, tight stuff. Right up until that insane ending. Which all might be a big misdirect."

Leigh Raines of TV Fanatic rated the episode with 4/5 saying that the end left her pretty speechless. "We all know that death doesn't exactly stick when it comes to The Vampire Diaries but the other side is disintegrating slowly before our eyes. Bonnie and Enzo's plan to use Maria is now kaput since Maria vanished into the darkness. Now what?"

Liane Bonin Starr from HitFix gave a good review to the episode and saying that the end was shocking and the season finale will be explosive. Starr also praises Trevino's portrayal as Julian: "It's still a little unnerving to see Caroline talking to Julian when he's inhabiting Tyler's body. Kudos to Michael Trevino for making Julian distinct as a character, and making his reaction to Maria's death — yanking out Stefan's heart — both wrenching and utterly believable."

Stephanie Hall of K Site TV also gave a good review to the episode saying: ""Promised Land" served as an amazing set up for the finale, ensuring that everything that could go wrong at this point did go wrong. For all of the drama that took place, there was a surprising amount of comedy that was utilized in the beginning of the episode in order to create a more radical shift in tone once the Travelers began their spell. It left off with quite an unexpected cliffhanger that further compels the audience to tune in next week to see how this will all play out."
