= The Cell (The Vampire Diaries) =

- The Vampire Diaries episode
- Episode no.: Season 5 Episode 9
- Directed by: Chris Grismer
- Written by: Melinda Hsu Taylor
- Production code: 2J7509
- Original air date: December 5, 2013

Guest appearances
- Michael Malarkey (Enzo); Rick Cosnett (Professor Wes Maxfield); Trevor St. John (Dr. Whitmore); Shaun Sipos (Aaron)

Episode chronology
← Previous "Dead Man on Campus"	Next → "Fifty Shades of Grayson"
- The Vampire Diaries season 5

"The Cell" is the ninth episode of the fifth season of the American series The Vampire Diaries and the series' 98th episode overall. "The Cell" was originally aired on December 5, 2013, on The CW. The episode was written by Melinda Hsu Taylor and directed by Chris Grismer.

== Plot ==
Damon (Ian Somerhalder) is still locked up by Wes (Rick Cosnett) who wants him to be his next object of investigation since he has lost his last one. Elena (Nina Dobrev) worries that Damon did not show up and she goes to find Aaron (Shaun Sipos) in hopes that he knows where Wes is. She finds him mourning Jesse's (Kendrick Sampson) death and he tells Elena that everyone around him die, friends and family, including his aunt Sara, his last family member, a few months ago.

Aaron wants to help Elena find Wes and he takes her to the Whitmore house, where he reveals that his last name is Whitmore and he is basically also owner of the college. Elena sees a picture of her dad along with others in the house and she wonders about it. Wes appears and tells her that her father was member of the Augustine community. While they are talking, he injects her with vervain. He locks her up in the cell next to Damon's where she wakes up confused.

Aaron does not know what is going on so he asks Wes for explanations. Wes admits that his real work is to study vampires and that Elena is a vampire, which is why he did what he did to her. He also tells Aaron about the Augustine community and that his father was also a member of it. He says that it is his legacy to continue what his father was trying to do, but when he tells him that his parents were killed by vampires and not animals, Aaron freaks out more. He hits Wes, takes a gun and leaves.

As Elena wakes up, she asks Damon what is going on and he informs her that he has been there before. Damon starts narrating her about what happened to him and what Augustine members did to him while the story plays out via flashbacks:

Back in 1953, Joseph Salvatore (Judd Lormand) calls Damon to come home to Mystic Falls. The reason he did it is because he was paid from the Augustine members. He shoots Damon up with vervain but before Damon passes out he stabs him in the neck. A man named Dr. Whitmore (Trevor St. John) appears, who informs Damon he will be his doctor from now on. Dr. Whitmore is Aaron's grandfather. From that moment Damon becomes an object for scientific study, which means getting tortured by Dr. Whitmore in order for the humans to find out vampires' strength and abilities.

Damon was captive for five years before he managed to escape. What kept him sane was another vampire who was also captured ten years before Damon, named Enzo (Michael Malarkey). Damon and Enzo were brutally tortured for five years. Everyday Dr. Whitmore would cut them open and remove organs, cut out pieces of their eyes, all for the purpose of Science. The two became friends, and Enzo even took Damon's torture when he thought Damon couldn't handle it anymore. Enzo was the one who helped Damon plan their escape, a plan that would set in practice the one day that the people who keep them take them out of their cells. When Dr Whitmore takes Damon out he attacks everyone. After killing them, he tries to free Enzo as well but the bars of the cage are covered in vervain and he cannot free him. So Damon shuts off his emotions so he can leave Enzo behind. He is afraid to try more since if he stays they will either capture him again or he will get burned by the fire that was started in the room. Damon leaves Enzo behind, believing he died in the fire.

After Damon finishes his narration about what happened, Elena starts saying how it will be okay because Stefan will rescue them. Then Damon tells her Stefan doesn't even know about the place. He never told him because he didn't want Stefan to feel more guilty than he already did. Shortly thereafter Aaron arrives in the basement to accuse Elena of killing his parents and Megan. Damon tells him that he was the one who killed his parents as well as every member of his family. Damon was following through with a revenge scheme that required him to kill every member of the Whitmore family, save one from each generation. This survivor who would be allowed to grow and start a new family; then, Damon would repeat the process.

Damon admits that his last victim was a woman named Sara few months ago. Sara was Aaron's aunt and the last family he had left. Elena gets upset hearing that since few months ago she and Damon were together and happy and she cannot believe that he did that. Aaron, hearing the news about his aunt, shoots him in the head and Damon drops unconscious.

Meanwhile, in Mystic Falls, Stefan (Paul Wesley) watches Katherine so she will not try to kill herself again but Katherine is tired of his PTSD and calls Caroline (Candice Accola) to come and help Stefan get over it. Caroline arrives with the safe that Stefan was locked in during the whole summer. Her plan is to lock him inside the safe again to face his fears.

Stefan gets into the safe but the plan is not working, so Katherine has another idea. In a moment where Stefan is unconscious, she gets into the safe with him. When Stefan wakes up, he is worried that he will kill her. Katherine does not worry about that at all and she tries to make him focus on what really bothers him - the breakup with Elena. He prefers the physical pain over the emotional one. This works and Stefan calms down while coming very close to Katherine. The moment they are about to kiss, Caroline opens the safe. They draw away but a little bit later, when Stefan goes to thank her, they end up having sex.

At the end of the episode, Damon wakes up in his cell after the shooting and he asks for Elena. Elena though is not in her cell. Elena was taken upstairs and is strapped to an exam table. Next to her there is another vampire, also strapped to another exam table. He introduces himself as Enzo (Michael Malarkey) and when Elena hears his name she looks surprised since according to Damon, Enzo was killed in the fire 60 years ago.

== Featured music ==
In "The Cell" we can hear the songs:

- "My Superman" by Santigold
- "I Need You" by Buddy Stewart
- "A Girl Like You" by Eddie Robbins
- "No Other One" by Buddy Stuart
- "Oo-Wee" by The Hearts
- "Walkin' After Midnight" by Patsy Cline
- "Yes Yes" by The Colourist
- "Creeplife" by Deap Vally
- "A New Pair Of Shoes" by Buddy Stuart

== Reception ==
=== Ratings ===
In its original American broadcast, "The Cell" was watched by 2.36 million; down by 0.31 from the previous episode.

=== Reviews ===
Stephanie Flasher from TV After Dark gave an A− rate to the episode saying that it was "quite a revealing" one. ""The Cell" was a good episode. Worth watching because reveals parts of Damon's past critical to the plot line."

Leigh Raines of TV Fanatic rated the episode with 4/5 saying that the episode was "full of dark moments of the Salvatore brothers facing their own psychological issues." She also praised Katherine's character: "In an episode full of PTSD, Panic Attacks, and miserable flashbacks, there's nothing like a little Katherine Pierce humor to lighten the mood. [...] I really need to give our Katerina props for her epic performances as of late. Whoever is writing for her character deserves a raise."

Thedude35 from Bitch Stole my Remote gave a good review to the episode stating: "After a season that has been surprisingly mediocre so far, ‘The Cell’ reminds me why I fell in love with this show in the first place. There's suspense, torture, some sexual tension and surprises at every turn. What more could we ask for?"

Stephanie Hall of KSiteTV also gave a good review to the episode stating that the flashbacks were a nice addition to the reveal of information. "Balancing the primary information-heavy storyline with the secondary emotional one, "The Cell" was a well-rounded hour that managed to jump start one intriguing plot and seemingly end an appropriate one. An interesting episode in a different capacity than the few weeks prior, this one felt low-key in all the right ways. "The Cell" perfectly set the scene for future emotional payoffs and twisted new problems."

Carrie Raisler of The A.V. Club gave the episode a C rate criticizing the story of Damon about being an Augustine vampire: "To be more specific, everything the show is doing with Damon right now is completely baffling" and that the story leaves many questions to the viewers. "This was actually a fairly streamlined episode of TVD, with most of the action happening either in the dungeons of Whitmore or back at the Salvatore mansion, where Katherine and Caroline team up to attempt to cure Stefan of his PTSD issues."
