= Fifty Shades of Grayson =

- The Vampire Diaries episode
- Episode no.: Season 5 Episode 10
- Directed by: Kellie Cyrus
- Written by: Caroline Dries
- Production code: 2J7510
- Original air date: December 12, 2013

Guest appearances
- Olga Fonda (Nadia); Michael Malarkey (Enzo); Rick Cosnett (Professor Wes Maxfield); Shaun Sipos (Aaron); Kayla Madison (young Elena); Jason MacDonald (Grayson Gilbert)

Episode chronology
← Previous "The Cell"	Next → "500 Years of Solitude"
- The Vampire Diaries season 5

"Fifty Shades of Grayson" is the tenth episode of the fifth season of the American series The Vampire Diaries and the series' 99th episode overall. "Fifty Shades of Grayson" was originally aired on December 12, 2013, on The CW. The episode was written by Caroline Dries and directed by Kellie Cyrus.

== Plot ==
Damon (Ian Somerhalder) escapes from his cell and returns to the Salvatore house looking for Elena (Nina Dobrev). Instead, he discovers Katherine who just ran from Stefan's (Paul Wesley) bedroom because she found more grey hair and panicked. Damon asks her if she has seen Elena. Katherine says she has not, and not so innocently mentions her tryst with Stefan the previous night.

Damon tells Stefan he cannot find Elena and they both head to the university to find Aaron (Shaun Sipos) since he is the only one who can help them track her down. Aaron is surprised seeing Damon alive since he shot him in the head back in Wes' prison cell. Aaron tries to run with no luck, and the two brothers use him as leverage to get Elena back. Aaron calls Wes (Rick Cosnett) and tells him that Damon and Stefan will kill him if he does not give them Elena. Wes agrees to the exchange and tells Aaron to meet him at his classroom.

But Wes sets a trap instead. He releases Enzo (Michael Malarkey), sending him to the classroom to deal with his own unresolved business with Damon. Before Wes sends him, he injects Enzo with poison telling him not to come back for the antidote unless he kills Damon.

Damon, Aaron and Stefan arrive at Wes' classroom but they find only Enzo. Stefan calls Wes but Wes refuses to come and threatens to kill Elena if they hurt Aaron. Stefan retorts that the threat goes both ways. Damon volunteers to kill Aaron when Stefan tells him about the phone call and Aaron, to save his life, reveals he has Augustine files in his dorm room. But Enzo, who wants them to listen to what happened to him after Damon failed to save him several decades ago, becomes quite aggravated and demands that Damon stay to listen when Aaron and Stefan leave for the dorm.

Enzo is still mad at Damon for leaving him behind and after a while they start fighting. He throws Damon through a window but Damon tells him he will not fight him back. Enzo informs him about the poison and that he has to kill him but the poison acts quickly on him and he collapses. Damon takes him back to the lab and injects him with everything that writes "antidote" on it. One of them works and Enzo wakes up. Damon explains him how he was able to leave him behind and the price he paid for it but Enzo does not care and he tells him that he will always be a monster.

Meanwhile, Stefan and Aaron arrive at the dorm and Aaron attempts to kill Stefan with one of the vampire weapons he has there. Stefan realizes his intentions and he stops him but before he kills him Aaron tells him the rest of Damon's story and how Damon killed all his family members for generations just to revenge. Stefan, after hearing Damon's revenge plan, lets Aaron live saying that not all vampires are like his brother. Stefan turns to leave but Aaron gives him all Wes' files before he goes.

In the meantime, Wes keeps Elena in the basement of her father's old medical practice. She wakes up and Wes informs her about her father's experiments and Elena stars having some memories of her as a little girl (Kayla Madison) with her father (Jason MacDonald). Despite the tortures she remembers that her father was doing all these to help people, for example to use the vampire blood as a cure to many diseases.

Wes prepares to inject Elena with the serum that will make her crave for vampire blood instead of human blood, but before can do it, Stefan arrives and saves her. Elena gets her father's journal before they leave and Aaron comes later on the basement finding Wes unconscious. He wakes him up and tells him that he is not helping people with this research and he is also furious at him because he sold him out to the Salvatore brothers without caring for his life. He tells him that he does not want to see him again and he leaves taking with him the syringe that contains the serum that Wes was going to inject Elena with.

Back at home, Elena reads her father's journal while Damon comes in and is mad at her because she defends him all the time, no matter what he has done in the past and how horrible it was. He tells her that he cannot change and he does not want to change her so he breaks up with her.

In the meantime, Katherine decides to solve her problem by working out and he asks Matt's (Zach Roerig) help. Matt calls Nadia (Olga Fonda) who is mad at Katherine for trying to kill herself without saying goodbye. Katherine asks about forgiveness and Nadia has a plan that might help Katherine; to put her spirit into another body like a traveler does. Katherine declines her offer because she likes her current body and Stefan likes it as well. Nadia realizes that the forgiveness Katherine asked was about Stefan and not her and she leaves disappointed. Before she leaves, she meets Matt and asks him to hold on to the traveler's knife in case Katherine changes her mind.

Katherine does change her mind after a conversation she has with Stefan that makes her think that there is yet hope for a relationship with him and at the end of the episode she calls Nadia to tell her she has changed his mind. She wants to make the exchange, but before she gets out of the house she has a heart attack and collapses.

== Featured music ==
In the "Fifty Shades of Grayson" episode we can hear the songs:

- "The Love Club" by Lorde
- "Where It Ends, Where It Begins" by Sacco
- "Fitzpleasure" by Alt-J
- "Slave" by Yeah Yeah Yeahs
- "All I Want" by Kodaline

== Reception ==
=== Ratings ===
In its original American broadcast, "Fifty Shades of Grayson" was watched by 2.44 million; slightly up by 0.08 from the previous episode.

=== Reviews ===
"Fifry Shades of Grayson" received mixed reviews.

Cindy McLennan of Television Without Pity" gave an A− rate to the episode.

Stephanie Flasher of TV After Dark also gave and A− rated to the episode saying that it was a great episode for a midseason finale and it was a game changer. "The episode had everything TVD fans have come to expect from the supernatural drama. There was a little something for everyone; suspense, drama, sorrow, heart break and even a little humor."

Thedude35 of Bitch Stole My Remote gave a good review to the episode saying that it was not bad for a midseason finale. "Besides a clever, laugh out loud title, ‘Fifty Shades of Grayson’ brings us some humour to break up the torture, death threats and broken hearts a-plenty."

Jen from TV Overmind said that the episode was a little bit "overwhelming" and "predictable" for a midseason finale. "I was expecting a bigger cliffhanger than just Katherine collapsing from a heart attack. That ending seemed less effective especially since we saw that she’ll be just barely hanging on in the hospital in the preview for the next episode in January. The little amount of time she’ll have left will probably be just enough time for Nadia, Matt, and Stefan (her only friends in Mystic Falls) to save her life. At least let’s hope they can save her, otherwise I’d be very disappointed."

Carrie Raisler from The A.V. Club gave a C− rate to the episode stating: "...it’s become readily apparent that the show is in the midst of a good, old-fashioned slump."

Matt Richenthal of TV Fanatic rated the episode with 2.1/5 saying that it was a little bit of disappointment. "The Vampire Diaries has become a victim of its own success. Especially on a midseason finale, fans expect violence. They expect shocks. They look forward to twists and turns and one doozy of a cliffhanger. But The Vampire Diaries Season 5 Episode 10 offered up none of the above."

Mike from No White Noise gave the episode 1.5/4 saying that the episode was not particularly awful but "it was sort of like, “Sure. That satisfied the requirements for one hour.”"
