= Monster's Ball (The Vampire Diaries) =

- The Vampire Diaries episode
- Episode no.: Season 5 Episode 5
- Directed by: Sonny Postiglione
- Written by: Kellie Cyrus
- Production code: 2J7505
- Original air date: October 31, 2013

Guest appearances
- Olga Fonda (Nadia); Janina Gavankar (Qetsiyah / Tessa); Rick Cosnett (Professor Wes Maxfield); Kendrick Sampson (Jesse); Shaun Sipos (Aaron)

Episode chronology
| ← Previous "For Whom the Bell Tolls" | Next → "Handle with Care" |
- The Vampire Diaries season 5

"Monster's Ball" is the fifth episode of the fifth season of the American series The Vampire Diaries and the series' 94th episode overall. "Monster’s Ball" was originally aired on October 31, 2013, on The CW. The episode was written by Sonny Postiglione and directed by Kellie Cyrus.

== Plot ==
After Professor Wes Maxfield (Rick Cosnett) killed Jesse (Kendrick Sampson) at the end of the last episode, this episode starts with him performing experiments on Jesse for unknown reasons and it seems that this is not the first one.

Meanwhile, Elena (Nina Dobrev) attempts to deal with Bonnie's (Kat Graham) death by distracting herself with her research about Megan's death and why Professor Maxfield covered the reason she died. While she ponders how to get the information she needs, she sees someone at Megan's grave. She approaches the stranger and asks him his name and if he knew Megan, but the man seems reluctant to answer her questions. It is later revealed that the man's name is Aaron (Shaun Sipos) and Professor Wes is his guardian. Wes asks Aaron to stay away from Elena and then, on an encounter with Elena at the Whitmore Historical Ball, he tells her to leave college and go back to Mystic Falls with her friends as there are people at Whitmore who are watching her.

Tyler (Michael Trevino) returns for Bonnie's funeral and spends some time with Caroline (Candice Accola) who still tries to convince him to cease what he is doing and come to college. Tyler informs her that he cannot let Klaus get away with what he did to his mom, Carol, and that he will hunt him down and kill him. Caroline tries to change his mind with no such luck. The two part ways, ending their relationship.

Nadia (Olga Fonda) still has Katherine captured and Silas (Paul Wesley) commences to try to find them but is unable to without his mental power. Katherine consistently asks Nadia what she wants from her and Nadia reveals to her that she is her daughter whom she left behind in 1492 and the only reason she became a vampire was to find her.

In the meantime, Damon (Ian Somerhalder) tells Jeremy (Steven R. McQueen) his plan about how they can bring Bonnie back to life. Because someone has to die to bring another back, Damon says that they should take advantage of the fact that Silas wants to die to be with his true love, Amara, so that Bonnie comes back. They have to work with Silas to do so and Bonnie does not agree with the idea.

Damon meets Silas to inform him about his plan and Silas agrees but own his terms; he wants Damon to "kill" his brother. By "killing" Stefan, the link between the two of them will be broken and Silas will have his mental power back. Damon just has to keep Stefan "dead" as long as Silas will be pretending to be Stefan so he can get the information he needs from Quetsiyah's (Janina Gavankar) head.

The plan goes well until the moment Stefan escapes from Damon before he "kills" him again and lets Quetsiyah know that she is talking to Silas and not him. Quetsiyah becomes enraged, reaches into his heart and twists it whilst making a spell causing it to stop. The spell turns Silas cold and grey and unable to move or do anything, but not dead. Damon and Elena find him and take him back to the Salvatore house.

Katherine arrives at the Salvatore home after Damon calls her and she is happy to see that Silas is gone, unbeknownst to the real reason Damon called her, to use her to bring Silas back. Silas starts to wake up after feeding on Katherine and while Katherine should be dead after this, she also wakes up with Elena and Damon not knowing why.

== Featured music ==
In the "Monster's Ball" episode we can hear the songs:

- "Au Revoir" by OneRepublic
- "The Waves That Rolled You Under" by Young Summer
- "Never Tear Us Apart" by Cary Brothers
- "Most Wanted" by Cults
- "You Don't Know" by Brooke Annibale

== Reception ==
=== Ratings ===
In its original American broadcast, "Monster's Ball" was watched by 2.07 million; down 0.56 from the previous episode.

=== Reviews ===
"Monster's Ball" received positive reviews.

Carrie Raisler of The A.V. Club gave a B rate to the episode saying that it still feels like the show hasn’t shifted gears from its season five premiere. "This episode was perfectly fine, in a season five that’s been full of fine so far. What I’m waiting for, and what I hope this Katherine story is going to bring, is the thing that elevates it beyond the fine to the fabulous."

Christopher Monigle from Star Pulse gave a good review to the episode but he stated that this season "is either on a path towards brilliance or going completely off the rails." and that too many plots might not be good for the show. "On the surface the amount of plot and movement through five episodes is exciting. TVD hasn’t lost the knack for break-neck pacing and crazy reveals. I don’t want TVD to lose its identity. Throwing as much plot into a story can trigger something bad."

Matt Richenthal from TV Fanatic rated the episode with 3.7/5. "The Vampire Diaries treated viewers to a trick-filled installment on Halloween night, one filled with multiple storylines, a lot of exposition and at least one mother of a surprise."

Stephanie Flasher from TV After Dark gave an A rate to the episode saying that it had a very similar feel to the earlier seasons of the series. "”Monster’s Ball” was everything a TVD fan could ask in an episode centered on a ball, dance, gala or any social gathering of that matter. It fully took advantage of most of the characters being together. There was romance, dancing, family, friendship, heartbreak and it wouldn’t be TVD if we didn’t have some doppelganger hi-jinx every now and then."

Stephanie Hall of KSiteTV gave a good review to the episode stating that the episode was fill of emotion. "Though not the most surprising or action packed episode of The Vampire Diaries, "Monster's Ball" was full of enough emotion to overshadow these minor missing elements. This season has so far done well to balance the Silas story with the characters' average life struggles by gearing an episode towards one or the other. "Monster's Ball," on the other hand, beautifully balanced both."

Tyler Olson from Crimson Tear though, rated the episode with 2/5 saying that the episode was "disappointing" and that "The only real saving grace in Monster's Ball was Katherine Pierce".
