= Resident Evil (The Vampire Diaries) =

- The Vampire Diaries episode
- Episode no.: Season 5 Episode 18
- Directed by: Paul Wesley
- Written by: Brian Young; Caroline Dries
- Production code: 2J7518
- Original air date: April 17, 2014

Guest appearances
- Marguerite MacIntyre as Elizabeth Forbes; Michael Malarkey as Enzo; Raffi Barsoumian as Markos; Penelope Mitchell as Liv Parker; Chris Brochu as Luke Parker

Episode chronology
← Previous "Rescue Me"	Next → "Man on Fire"
- The Vampire Diaries season 5

"Resident Evil" is the 18th episode of the fifth season of the American series The Vampire Diaries and the series' 107th episode overall. "Resident Evil" was originally aired on April 17, 2014, on The CW. The episode was written by Caroline Dries and Brian Young and directed by Paul Wesley. The episode is Wesley's debut as director in the series.

== Plot ==
The episode starts with Elena (Nina Dobrev) having a dream/vision about her and Stefan (Paul Wesley) meeting for the first time. She wakes up and feels that what she saw was weird. Elena goes to a cafe with Caroline (Candice Accola) where Elena has another vision. She talks to Caroline about it, and Caroline explains that now that Elena has broken up with Damon (Ian Somerhalder), the universe is trying to get her and Stefan back together. Stefan calls Caroline to tell her that he has visions as well, and they realize that something is not right.

Liv (Penelope Mitchell) agrees to work with Tyler (Michael Trevino) and Matt (Zach Roerig), but she cannot trust them not being possessed by travelers. So, she tells them that they have to stab themselves with the traveler's knife to prove it. Matt does not like the idea, but he does it since he does not have a choice. After it is proven that none of them are possessed, Liv explains that the travelers are probably taking over Mystic Falls by getting into people's bodies, and their job is to find them and stab them with the traveler's knife to kill them.

Bonnie (Kat Graham) tries to call Jeremy (Steven R. McQueen), but he is not answering. When she hangs up the phone, her Grams (Jasmine Guy) appears to warn her that something is not right on the other side. Grams thinks that the travelers tried to overwhelm Bonnie so that someone can pass through her. Grams leaves, and Bonnie heads to Jeremy's where she finds him there with Liv. She wants to know what is going on, but Jeremy says he cannot tell her and that she has to trust him.

Caroline cannot reach her mom and asks Matt to help her find her while she calls Enzo (Michael Malarkey) to inform him and Damon that there is something going on with Elena and Stefan. She tells them about the visions and that the travelers must have something to do with it since now there is only one pair of doppelgangers because of them. Damon does not really feel comfortable hearing about the visions, and he suggests finding a witch to stop them.

Matt goes to sheriff Forbes's (Marguerite MacIntyre) office to find her, but when he gets there, he realizes that something is wrong. He calls Tyler, asking him to bring the traveler's knife. Sheriff Forbes, possessed by a traveler, comes in and hears the end of the conversation. She does not like it, and stabs Matt in the neck, killing him and sending him to the other side. Before he passes through Bonnie to get there, Matt tells her that the Sheriff has been taken over and to inform Jeremy about it.

At the other side, Matt sees Kol (Nathaniel Buzolic), the Original that Jeremy killed. Matt wonders why he can see him, and Kol tells him that the other side is messed up because someone got out. Matt then starts looking for Vicki (Kayla Ewell). He finds her, and Vicki tells him that he has to go back to his body before she disappears again. Kol approaches Matt and tells him exactly the same thing, that he has to return to his body and tell the others what is going on to the other side so they can stop it, otherwise everything will fall apart.

Elena and Caroline go to Damon's to discuss the visions "problem". Elena and Damon have a talk alone, where she asks him to be friends, but Damon changes the subject to her visions with Stefan. Elena says that it is like those visions happen in an alternate universe, and they are happy together. Damon gets the opportunity to remind her about the prophecy that the doppelgangers should be together. The conversation is interrupted by Luke (Chris Brochu), who is there to help them, since his sister is busy.

Tyler runs into sheriff Forbes. Realizing that she is possessed, he stabs her to kill the traveler inside her. Caroline takes her mother home and gives her some of her blood to heal her from the stabbing, and waits for her to wake up.

Luke explains that he cannot stop Elena and Stefan's visions because Marcos (Raffi Barsoumian), the leader of the travelers, is back, and he is the one who causes them. Marcos tries to draw Elena and Stefan together, and Elena says that the travelers need their blood. Elena has another vision where she and Stefan celebrate their anniversary, but she can also see the address of "their" home. Elena's vision stops, and she says that she knows where Marcos is.

Damon and Enzo go to the address and find Marcos. Damon asks him what he wants and what is going on, and Marcos explains that the doppelganger legend is not real. He was the one who cast a spell 1500 years ago, promising true love. This is so the doppelgangers would get together, and the travelers could have their blood. Marcos explains to Damon that the witches put a curse on the travelers, so they will not be able to gather together. The only way to do it is by possessing other bodies. They need the doppelgangers' blood, but they do not intend to harm them. In a matter of good faith, he says he will stop the visions, and he does.

There is one more vision where Stefan and Elena are happy with 2 children. But Marcos ends the visions in the middle of this one as Elena gets back to reality.

Elena and Stefan are free from the visions, and they talk about them, feeling a little sad that it ended since they were so happy in them. They know that those were not real but what they felt for each other was, and it was not the result of the doppelganger curse since that curse was fake. They both agree that they will always love each other. She later meets Damon to thank him for stopping the visions, but Damon tells her that he cannot be friends with her and does not want to see her again because it is hard for him. Elena walks away.

In the meantime, Jeremy and Bonnie are at the Sheriff's office waiting for Matt to come back to life. When Matt comes back, he remembers what happened on the other side, though that had never happened before. He tells them about Vicki and asks Bonnie to tell him what is going on, but she doesn't know.

The episode ends with Caroline talking to Tyler, saying she is worried about her mom not waking up yet. Tyler tells her to give her some time. They hang up the phone, and it is revealed that Tyler is with Marcos and tells him that "they are in". He also gives him the only travelers' knife that was left, and Marcos destroys it.

== Feature music ==
In the "Resident Evil" episode we can hear the songs:

- "Mad World" by Sara Hickman
- "Woman" by Wolfmother
- "Warm/Happy" by The Lonely Forest
- "It Was Blue" by Angus Stone
- "Outro" by M83

== Reception ==
=== Ratings ===
In its original American broadcast, "Resident Evil" was watched by 1.66 million; down by 0.07 from the previous episode.

=== Reviews ===
"Resident Evil" received mixed reviews.

Stephanie Flasher from TV After Dark gave the episode a B rating saying that it was a good one with a very nostalgic feeling to it. "This week’s cliffhanger was very predictable with Tyler possessed. However, Paul did a wonderful job directing the episode. And it was a pleasant surprise seeing Kol and Vicki pop up on the ‘other side.’"

Carrie Raisler of The A.V. Club gave the episode a B− rating and she compares the true love curse to the Sun and Moon curse, both of them turning out to be fake. "Both involve an evil mastermind perpetrating false information to bring together the supernatural forces necessary to complete a long-simmering, nefarious plan. But while the Sun and Moon curse reveal was electrifying and downright brave, the doppelganger prophecy twist just seems limp and sad in comparison." Raisler also comments on Wesley's directorial debut saying: "[Wesley is] doing a fine job with a tricky episode that had not only regular action, but also visions and a significant look at the Other Side as well. His transitions from the regular action to the visions were especially impressive."

Stephanie Hall from K Site TV gave a good review to the episode saying: "It was an interesting episode that held my attention better than some others this season despite its seemingly fragmented storylines and the fact that the Travelers are simultaneously making more and less sense. In addition, it’s always a nice surprise when a few familiar faces pop up." Hall also praised Wesley's work as director of the episode: "This marked an impeccable directorial debut for Paul Wesley, hopefully his first time directing of many. [...] If you didn’t know beforehand that this episode was directed by a first-timer, you certainly would not have guessed it afterwards. Paul Wesley did an amazing job capturing this episode, to say the least. Not only was it one of the most visually beautiful episodes of the series, but it’s also impressive to see the way he distinguished reality from the visions and from the Other Side with their color schemes and the level of enthusiasm that permeated the different performances."

Jen of TV Over Mind also gave a good review to the episode and praised Wesley for his directional debut: "Paul Wesley deserves a round of applause for this incredible episode that served as his directorial debut on The Vampire Diaries. Seriously, it was very impressive for numerous reasons including how it dealt with the mythical doppelganger prophecy and the mythology of the Travelers."

Ashley Dominique of Geeked Out Nation gave a C+ rating to the episode saying: "No one seemed to be looking for the truth or working together to piece all the information they had on a clear picture about the travelers and Marcos' intentions."

Matt Richenthal from TV Fanatic rated the episode with only 1.1/5 saying that the episode was boring and a horrid hour of television. "Overall, very little happened. We discovered that Markos does want the Travelers to take over Mystic Falls; that Jeremy has to be better at communicating with his girlfriend; that Paul Wesley is a strong director; that Ezno is BY FAR the best part of TVD at this point; and that Tyler has been taken over by a Passenger. But around and around we go with the Elena/Damon/Stefan nonsense. When the characters themselves are bored, doesn't that pretty much say it all?"
