= While You Were Sleeping (The Vampire Diaries) =

- The Vampire Diaries episode
- Episode no.: Season 5 Episode 16
- Directed by: Pascal Verschooris
- Written by: Caroline Dries
- Production code: 2J7516
- Original air date: March 20, 2014

Guest appearances
- Michael Malarkey (Enzo); Caitlin McHugh (Sloan); Penelope Mitchell (Liv Parker); Shaun Sipos (Aaron Whitmore); Chris Brochu (Luke Parker)

Episode chronology
← Previous "Gone Girl"	Next → "Rescue Me"
- The Vampire Diaries season 5

"While You Were Sleeping" is the 16th episode of the fifth season of the American series The Vampire Diaries and the series' 105th episode overall. "While You Were Sleeping" was originally aired on March 20, 2014, on The CW. The episode was written by Caroline Dries and directed by Pascal Verschooris.

== Plot ==
Elena (Nina Dobrev) wakes up in her body after three weeks since the day Katherine has taken over it and, she is trapped at the college dorms. Stefan (Paul Wesley), Bonnie (Kat Graham) and Caroline (Candice Accola) asked Liv (Penelope Mitchell) to cast a spell and seal her there since they can find out the antidote of the ripper/werewolf virus that Katherine injected her body with before she died. Stefan is there with her while Bonnie is with Liv trying to teach her how to practice magic and Caroline is at Wes' laboratory trying to find the antidote. Meanwhile, Damon (Ian Somerhalder) is also locked up and chained at the Salvatore house's basement, waiting for the antidote. Jeremy (Steven R. McQueen) and Matt (Zach Roerig) guard him and bring him some vampire blood every few hours.

Caroline runs into Enzo (Michael Malarkey) who tells her that he was working with the travelers and they have the antidote but to give it to them, Stefan has to meet with the travelers. Caroline calls Stefan and agrees to meet them, leaving Elena alone. Elena and Damon are on the phone talking about those three weeks and Damon tries to fill Elena in. He tells her that he killed Wes but he does not tell her that he also killed Aaron (Shaun Sipos). Elena starts having the symptoms of the virus and she hallucinates, nose bleeding and coughing blood. In her hallucinations she sees Katherine hitting on Stefan while she tries to tell him that Katherine has taken over her body.

Stefan finds Caroline and Enzo where they agreed to meet. The travelers are also there and inform Caroline and Stefan that they managed, with the help of Enzo, to find an antidote for the ripper virus but they need something in exchange to hand it over to them. The travelers need Stefan to help them find his doppelganger by linking him to Stefan. Stefan hesitates at first since when Tessa did that to him in the past and linked him to Silas, he had lost his memories. Sloan (Caitlin McHugh) tells him that they will be careful and that will not happen again and he agrees to do it, even though Caroline disagrees.

Elena's hallucinations continue and this time she sees Aaron where she realizes that he is dead. She believes that she is the one who killed him and starts getting crazy. She calls Damon to ask him if it is true that Aaron is dead and if she killed him. Damon does not know what to tell her. Elena believes that everyone is lying to her and hangs up on Damon. Damon knows that Elena is not fine and she will hurt herself and he wants to go to her. He calls Matt and manages to capture him, throwing his ring away. He threatens Jeremy that if he will not let him go to Elena he will kill Matt and Jeremy releases him.

Luke (Chris Brochu), a college student, finds Elena and tries to help her. Elena does not remember him and she realizes that she met her when Katherine was in her body. She compels him and feeds him her blood to turn him so she can feed but she sees marks on his neck and realizes that Katherine was feeding on him. She stops and asks him to find Bonnie and Liv so they can break the seal and she can get out. Luke does exactly what she tells him and when Bonnie and Liv arrive, Elena asks them to undo the seal. Bonnie tries to explain her that it is better for her to stay there but Elena throws a stake at Liv and she tells her that if she will not break the seal so she can heal her, she will die.

In the meantime, Stefan does what the travelers ask him to do and they locate his doppelganger in Atlanta while Enzo leaves with the antidote to take it to Damon and Elena. Caroline tries to make Sloan stop the ritual after they found out what they wanted but she wants to continue until they kill the doppelganger. Caroline puts a knife on her throat making her stop and release Stefan.

Damon meet with Elena who is going crazy since she believes that she killed Aaron. Damon tells her that he was the one who killed him because he thought that she had broken up with him when Enzo appears with the antidote. They take it and they return home. Enzo returns to Stefan, Caroline and the travelers. Stefan wakes up after the ritual and Caroline informs him that they found the doppelganger but to make the travelers stop, she agreed to find him with Enzo and kill him.

In the meantime, Bonnie escorts Liv to her dorm and tells her that if she does not want to do magic, they can stop. Liv though says that she wants to continue and they agree to meet the next day to continue the lessons. Liv enters her room and she finds Luke waiting for her. It is revealed that Luke is her brother and that the two of them know more things that they let others believe, plus that Liv already knows how to practice magic.

The episode ends with Elena and Damon fighting over their relationship and how much one depends on another. They decide to break up because their love makes them something else of what they really are but they end up in bed together because they cannot fight what they feel for each other.

== Feature music ==
In the "While You Were Sleeping" episode we can hear the songs:

- "Fire Breather" by Laurel
- "Avant Gardener" by Courtney Barnett
- "Alive" by Empire of the Sun

== Reception ==
=== Ratings ===
In its original American broadcast, "While You Were Sleeping" was watched by 2.28 million; up by 0.09 from the previous episode.

=== Reviews ===
"While You Were Sleeping" received good reviews.

Stephanie Flasher from TV After Dark gave an A− rate to the episode saying that it was good with a nice pace and good plot development while a new character (Luke) was introduced.

Carrie Raisler from The A.V. Club gave a B rate to the episode saying that it was an entertaining one.

Leigh Raines of TV Fanatic rated the episode with 3.5/5 commenting that "it was interesting to see werewolf venom break Elena apart differently than it has everyone else. We've only seen it in the form of a bite, so normally the audience is treated with the picture of a nasty skin rash and then the rest follows." Rebecca Serle of Vulture rated the episode with 4/5.

Sydney Bucksbaum from Zap2It gave a good review to the episode saying that it was fantastic. "Not only were we introduced to new, nefarious characters, we also are getting a new doppelgänger, a new hot ship (Caroline and Enzo! Give in to your chemistry! Do it!) and the promise of some really cool mythology down the road about doppelgängers that we've never heard of before. This is why everyone loves spring break."

Alyse Wax of Fearnet also gave a good review to the episode stating: "Finally, we are back to some good times in Mystic Falls. [...] I like where we are going. We have some more doppelgänger drama - but this time with Stefan’s doppelganger. We have a new faux-ally who is plotting a downfall. I like that the set up with Liv and Luke was slow; they were around for a bunch of episodes and their "turn" felt more natural."

Caroline Preece from Den of Geek also gave a good review to the episode saying that it gave the fans something to get excited about. "The episode leaves us in a promising place, then, and I’m excited to see where it’s going for the first time in a long time. Crucially, though, that has nothing to do with the main trio, and everything to do with the new additions. Enzo, Liv and Luke – welcome to the family."

Stephanie Hall from KSiteTV gave a good review to the episode saying that it was interesting, but not necessarily exciting. "What it lacked in intensity and grand shock value, it made up for in the subtle ways in which it reimagined topics that we have become familiar with over the past several years. Overall, "While You Were Sleeping" was an average episode, filled with a mix of what the series does well and what it has struggled with, especially this season."

Shannon Vestal of Buzzsugar said that the episode was good because it introduced us to another new character and the next potential drama. "I love it and want to find out more about these mysterious foes, especially if it means we don't have to deal with the Travelers anymore."
