= Original Sin (The Vampire Diaries) =

- The Vampire Diaries episode
- Episode no.: Season 5 Episode 3
- Directed by: Jesse Warn
- Written by: Melinda Hsu Taylor; Rebecca Sonnenshine
- Production code: 2J7503
- Original air date: October 17, 2013

Guest appearances
- Olga Fonda (Nadia); Janina Gavankar (Qetsiyah / Tessa)

Episode chronology
| ← Previous "True Lies" | Next → "For Whom the Bell Tolls" |
- The Vampire Diaries season 5

"Original Sin" is the third episode of the fifth season of the American series The Vampire Diaries, and the series' 92nd episode overall. "Original Sin" was originally aired on October 17, 2013, on The CW. The episode was written by Melinda Hsu Taylor and Rebecca Sonnenshine and directed by Jesse Warn.

The episode received mixed reviews with some of the reviewers criticizing the amnesia storyline.

== Plot ==
Elena and Katherine (Nina Dobrev) both have the same dream about Stefan (Paul Wesley). They see him enter a bar, attack someone, let them go and then, when he gets out, he burns in the sun. After the dream, Elena and Damon (Ian Somerhalder) try to find where the bar they saw in the dream is so they can find Stefan. Katherine goes with them on the road trip because they cannot leave her behind while Silas is looking for her.

Stefan is found and saved by Qetsiyah (Tessa in present time played by Janina Gavankar) who is later revealed that she is a powerful witch from Silas' past. Stefan asks her to tell him who she is and Tessa tells him the story of her and Silas when they first met in Ancient Greece two thousand years ago. Silas was in love with Amara (the progenitor of the Petrova doppelgängers) and he wanted them to live together forever. He pretended to be in love with Qetsiyah so she could make them an immortality spell which she does thinking that it would be for the two of them. Silas stole it and drank it with Amara, abandoning Qetsiyah the day of their wedding. Qetsiyah found out what happened, so she created the Cure, gave it to Amara and then killed her. She tried to force Silas to take it too but he refused, so Qetsiyah locked him in the tomb for 2000 years with the Cure hoping he would take it. Qetsiyah was watching him all these years from the Other Side (she admits that she created the Other Side too) but got frustrated when Silas was freed and the Hunters (who she sent) failed to kill him. She managed to escape from the Other Side when Bonnie (Kat Graham) dropped the veil and now she tries to kill Silas by herself, but she needs Stefan for her plan.

In the meantime, Silas still looks for Katherine and Nadia (Olga Fonda) tries to convince him that she is on his side and wants to help him find her. Nadia goes to Matt (Zach Roerig) and with a ritual brings back her friend Gregor, whom she killed in the previous episode, into Matt's body. Gregor, as Matt, calls Elena so they can find out where Katherine is.

Elena, Damon and Katherine get to the bar where Stefan was but while they are talking to the bar tender, Nadia appears. Elena distracts her so Katherine can escape but Nadia reaches her and leads her to her car where Silas waits for her. When Silas asks Nadia to give him Katherine, she denies because she wants some things in return, things that Silas is not willing to discuss so he starts controlling Nadia's mind to kill herself.

Damon, following the bar tender's hints, finds where Stefan is kept and encounters Tessa. Tessa explains to him why she needs Stefan and that she will not let Damon take him until she finishes what she needs to do. Tessa wants to link Stefan to Silas to weaken his mind power because that is the only way to face him and kill him. Tessa does the spell, Stefan is unconscious and Silas cannot control Nadia's mind anymore, the exact moment he asks her to kill herself, making Nadia run away with Katherine. Tessa tells Damon about the doppelgängers, that Stefan is meant to be with Elena no matter what, and that Damon does not have a chance to be with her. Tessa then tries to make a deal with Damon; leave Stefan with her so he can live alone with Elena, but Damon declines it.

At the end of the episode it is revealed why Silas wants Katherine. Katherine's blood is now the Cure since she took it and Silas wants her so he can drain her blood and get rid of the Cure once and for all, while Tessa wants Katherine so that she can take the Cure and kill Silas herself. Back at the Salvatore house, Stefan wakes up with amnesia. He cannot remember anything, including who Damon and Elena are.

== Featured music ==
In the "Original Sin" episode we can hear the songs:

- "Dear Mr. President" by Fitz and the Tantrums
- "Breathing Underwater" by Metric
- "Way Out" by Bass Drum of Death
- "Hello Lover" by Empires
- "Hard Times" by J Roddy Walston and the Business
- "Satellite Call" by Sara Bareilles

== Reception ==
=== Ratings ===
In its original American broadcast, "Original Sin" was watched by 2.93 million; up 0.79 from the previous episode.

=== Reviews ===
"Original Sin" received mixed reviews.

Matt Richenthal of TV Fanatic rated the episode with 4.4/5 saying that Qetsiyah was "awesome" and that "she was the driving force behind an episode that managed to be both very focused and very scattered. [...] The hour told just one story, but what a bat $hit crazy story it is...." He also commented on the amnesia plot, saying that it's "dumb, stupid, ridiculous and awful'.

Crystal Bell from Wet Paint stated that it was one of the best episodes of the show. "It was a fast-paced thrill-ride, full of twists and turns."

Michael from No White Noise gave the episode 2.5/4 saying that this was "the most fun episode to watch".

Eric Goldman from IGN rated the episode with 8/10 saying that it was a pretty focused episode. He praised Paul Wesley's acting "[Paul Wesley] does deadpan well" and stated that he and Janina Gavankar were very fun. "What was especially amusing was the show getting pretty meta here about its central love triangle."

Stephanie Hall of KSiteTV gave a good review to the episode saying that "season five has been on a roll and "Original Sin" was no exception". About Gavankar's character she stated that "she is crazy but also sympathetic" but she expected her to be more "wild and eccentric". She closed her review saying: "...the way [Qetsiyah] was presented was excellent. She was threatening and extensively powerful as a witch, while also believable and grounded in real human emotions. Janina Gavankar embodied this role exceptionally well, and luckily Qetsiyah's plan is far from over."

Alyse Wax from Fear Net also criticized the amnesia story: "I was so into it the story until Stefan woke up and said, “I’m sorry, I have no idea who you people are.” Amnesia is one of the laziest storytelling tricks."

TheDude35 from Bitch Stole My Remote said that it was a great episode and that "finally someone has explained the doppelgänger situation" and he loves when "questions get answered every once in a while".

Christopher Monigle from Star Pulse didn't like the episode saying that it was "a convoluted mess" and that "[Original Sin] is another reason to worry about the quality of the show". He closes his review: "I sort of wish this episode never happened, but it's early in the season. The writers failed to pull together the different parts of last year's central narrative together and far from resolving it this season. Hopefully, something was learned from that failure last season, and this ends by episode ten."
