= Handle with Care (The Vampire Diaries) =

- The Vampire Diaries episode
- Episode no.: Season 5 Episode 6
- Directed by: Jeffrey Hunt
- Written by: Caroline Dries; Holly Brix
- Production code: 2J7506
- Original air date: November 7, 2013

Guest appearances
- Janina Gavankar (Qetsiyah / Tessa); Rick Cosnett (Professor Wes Maxfield); Shaun Sipos (Aaron)

Episode chronology
← Previous "Monster's Ball"	Next → "Death and the Maiden"
- The Vampire Diaries season 5

"Handle with Care" is the sixth episode of the fifth season of the American series The Vampire Diaries and the series' 95th episode overall. "Handle with Care" was originally aired on November 7, 2013, on The CW. The episode was written by Caroline Dries and Holly Brix and directed by Jeffrey Hunt.

Nina Dobrev received positive reviews about her portrayal of three different characters, Elena, Katherine and Amara.

== Plot ==
Silas (Paul Wesley) is a mortal witch again and now he cannot wait to die so he can be with his one true love again. In order to do that, he has to first destroy the Other Side that Qetsiyah (Janina Gavankar) created to trap deceased supernatural beings. He has to destroy it so he will not get trapped there when he dies. He explains to Damon (Ian Somerhalder) and Elena (Nina Dobrev) that to do that, they have to first find the anchor that Qetsiyah bonded to the Other Side and destroy it and that this anchor is in New Jersey. Silas, Damon and Jeremy (Steven R. McQueen) leave for New Jersey while Elena stays behind since Silas does not want her with them. Before they go, Elena makes sure to remind Silas that he has to bring Bonnie (Kat Graham) back to life before he dies and he promises that he will.

Stefan wakes up at Tessa's cabin and seems confused. Tessa explains to him what happened and also tells him that he had a text she could not resist reading, and from it she knows Silas is mortal again and she can finally kill him. Tessa reminds Stefan that Silas knows where the anchor is due to his mind reading power so she has to kill him before he tries to destroy it. But when she tries to leave the cabin she cannot because Silas cast a spell on it. Tessa and Stefan are trapped in the cabin until the sundown.

Elena does not know where Stefan is and tries to find him. She keeps calling him until Tessa answers his phone while he is in another room. Tessa tells Elena she slept with Stefan. Elena does not understand why Stefan prefers to be with Tessa, and Damon is forced to tell her what he and Silas did to him in order Silas get his power back so he can read Tessa's mind. Elena decides to go to Tessa’s house to check up on Stefan and when she walks through the front door she also falls victim to the spell.

Silas, Damon and Jeremy arrive in New Jersey and start searching for the anchor but Silas does not know exactly where it is or what it looks like. While they are searching, Tessa calls Damon and demands he kill Silas before Silas can destroy the anchor, otherwise she will kill Elena. Damon, even though he promised Elena to bring Bonnie back, decides to do what Tessa asks of him so Elena won’t die. On his way to do it, Damon is attacked by two travelers who tell him they don’t want him to kill Silas yet. Damon kills both of them, then calls Tessa back to ask why the travelers would stop him since they hate Silas. Tessa tells him they want Silas because he is the only source of the cure now, and reveals to him that the anchor is not an object but a person - a person Silas won’t be able to hurt.

Silas finds the anchor and is surprised to discover it is his true love, Amara, as he had believed she was dead. Qetsiyah had imprisoned her in stone for 2,000 years. He feeds her blood, to awaken her. As she revives, Amara is confused how he is still alive. He explains everything to her and when Amara hears that Silas took the cure, she stabs him and drains him because she does not want to live one more day. Damon finds Amara alone and confused and when he realizes that she is not immortal anymore, he captures her and takes her back to the Salvatore house to protect her, since she is the one thing keeping the Other Side - and Bonnie - existing. If Amara dies, the Other Side will be destroyed and Bonnie will never come back to life.

Back in the cabin, Stefan is trying to cook something and he is very cozy with Tessa despite Elena's presence. Elena cannot understand why Stefan is acting that way. Stefan, in a moment where Tessa is not close enough to hear him, tells Elena he is trying to help her and he will not let Tessa kill her. He stabs Tessa at sundown and he and Elena manage to escape and return home. Damon and Jeremy are there too and Damon tells Elena and Jeremy that they have to protect Amara from now on.

In the meantime, Katherine celebrates the fact that she is still alive, when she is surprised to discover a gray lock of hair. She does not know where to go for help since Damon does not want her and Stefan does not remember her, so she goes to Elena and Caroline's dorm room. Caroline (Candice Accola) is packing to leave when she realizes that the woman she is talking to is not Elena but Katherine.

Katherine offers to help her discover what the professor is doing in exchange for letting her stay with her. They go to Maxfield's (Rick Cosnett) laboratory, tie him to a chair and start draining him to get the vervain out of his system. Once they can compel him, Maxfield tells them of a secret society on campus, and how the members were going to invite Elena to be a member until they began to suspect she was a vampire. Maxfield does not realize he is talking to Katherine and not Elena who tells Caroline it won't be very difficult to prove that Elena is not a vampire.

Katherine shows up to the society party and enters the house without an invitation. This convinces the society members that Elena is not a vampire. Katherine sees Aaron (Shaun Sipos) there and while they are talking, she loses one of her teeth. She does not know what is happening to her and leaves the party immediately.

Back at the laboratory, Caroline compels Maxfield to tell her about the secret society and why he covered Megan's death. He reveals that the name of the society is “Augustine” and that he covered the real reason of Megan's death because the vampire who killed her was Augustine. Before Caroline gets the chance to ask for more details, a member of the society knocks on the door. Caroline compels Maxfield to forget everything that happened over the last few hours and that she and Elena are vampires.

Later, when Maxfield is alone, Katherine comes back and reveals to him that she is not Elena and asks for his help. She wants him to help her discover what is happening to her because she believes she is dying and she wants him to stop it; if he will not help her then she’ll reveal to the whole campus what he has been doing in his laboratory (experimenting on vampires).

The episode ends with Tessa and Stefan, where Tessa gives Stefan all his memories back to make him suffer after he betrayed her to help Elena.

== Featured music ==
In the "Handle with Care" episode we can hear the songs:

- "Spark" by Fitz and the Tantrums
- "The Walker" by Fitz and The Tantrums
- "Keep Your Eyes Peeled" by Queens of the Stone Age
- "Stars" by The Delta Riggs
- "Shine" by Wild Belle
- "Elephant" by Tame Impala
- "Bitter Rivals" by Sleigh Bells

== Reception ==
=== Ratings ===
In its original American broadcast, "Handle with Care" was watched by 2.59 million; up 0.52 from the previous episode.

=== Reviews ===
"Handle with Care" received positive reviews.

Stephanie Flasher of TV After Dark gave an A− to the episode saying that it was a good episode.

Carrie Raisler from The A.V. Club gave a B− rate to the episode saying that the episode "while intermittently entertaining" it was "lacking any clear purpose or focus."

Mario of Nad's Reviews gave a B rate to the episode stating that it was "an average episode that finally moves the story along, but at the unfortunate price of character development." Mario praised Dobrev's acting: "That woman astounds at every turn".

Christopher Monigle from Star Pulse said that "the episode was mostly entertaining and worthwhile though it’s just a transitional episode. Plot-wise, nothing’s accomplished. I stopped expecting the characters to succeed early in the season four years ago when a coin-wielding Elijah arrived in Mystic Falls. [...] The sense that the show’s going off the rails and won’t recover persists, but the character work tonight was terrific, except for the Bonnie/Jeremy scenes."

Stephanie Hall of KSiteTV gave a good review to the episode saying that it was "an enjoyable hour". ""Handle With Care" brought back the show's missing cleverness that I mentioned last week and also brought about new and exciting forces for the character's to confront in the coming weeks." Hall also praised Dobrev of playing three different characters.

Mike from Coollado rated the episode with 3/4 and said that this was the best episode of The Vampire Diaries in a very long while. "I can't exactly explain why I liked this episode the most this season. I think it's just that it was quite fun and entertaining. The dialogue was something else, in that it was refreshing and not at all contrived."

Despite the positive reviews, Matt Richenthal of TV Fanatic rated the episode with 2.3/5 saying that the episode it wasn't the "best installment or the best coherent of The Vampire Diaries, but it was sure the funniest".
