= Gone Girl (The Vampire Diaries) =

- The Vampire Diaries episode
- Episode no.: Season 5 Episode 15
- Directed by: Lance Anderson
- Written by: Melinda Hsu Taylor
- Production code: 2J7515
- Original air date: March 6, 2014

Guest appearances
- Olga Fonda (Nadia); Rick Cosnett (Wes Maxfield); Penelope Mitchell (Liv Parker)

Episode chronology
| ← Previous "No Exit" | Next → "While You Were Sleeping" |
- The Vampire Diaries season 5

"Gone Girl" is the 15th episode of the fifth season of the American series The Vampire Diaries and the series' 104th episode overall. "Gone Girl" was originally aired on March 6, 2014, on The CW. The episode was written by Melinda Hsu Taylor and directed by Lance Anderson.

== Plot ==
Nadia (Olga Fonda) has hallucinations of her past while she was searching for her mother Katherine (Nina Dobrev), after Tyler (Michael Trevino) bit her. Katherine is there for her and tells her that she will not leave her side and that she will find a way to save her life but not by asking Klaus (Joseph Morgan) for help. Instead, she calls Wes (Rick Cosnett) who takes a sample of the werewolf toxin from Nadia's wound and promised to create an antidote.

Meanwhile, Stefan (Paul Wesley) and Caroline (Candice Accola) inform everyone that Katherine has taken over Elena's body and they try to find a way to bring Katherine to them before she realizes that she knows. Tyler says that he bit Nadia and they all figure out that Katherine must be with her daughter and that they have to find something that Elena could not say no to. Katherine finds excuses for everything, and the persistence of everyone trying to see her makes her figure out that they have figured out her identity. She tests this by calling Damon (Ian Somerhalder), who falls into her trap and practically begs her to come over to the Salvatore house, which she realizes he would not do to Elena, as the previous day he tried to kill her. Katherine confirms her suspicions but the phone call also makes Stefan realize that she knows that they know.

Bonnie (Kat Graham) and Jeremy (Steven R. McQueen) go to college to find Liv (Penelope Mitchell) and ask her help. They need her to do a spell to find Katherine's location. Liv agrees to help but her interest on Jeremy makes Bonnie get jealous.

Tyler watches over Damon who knows what buttons to push to make him enter the cell. The two of them argue and when Tyler gets close enough, Damon grabs him and feeds on him. Damon gets his strength back, breaks the chains and escapes. Damon heads to find Wes to ask him for the antidote of the ripper virus, but Wes refuses to help him, leading Damon to kill him. Meanwhile, Katherine takes Nadia to a church to keep her safe while waiting for Wes, but because Wes is taking a long time with the cure, Katherine leaves to find him. When she gets to his laboratory, she finds him dead.

Stefan calls Katherine revealing her that they know and tells her that they have Nadia at the Salvatore house and if she wants she can run away to survive or come and see her daughter for a last time. Katherine chooses the latter and shows up at the Salvatore house. Everyone is there and they let her in with Nadia to say goodbye. Katherine apologizes to Nadia, tells her that she loves her and Nadia dies happy. Katherine stands and tries to get away but Damon is blocking the door. She seems to accept that there is no way out this time and she asks who has the traveler knife to stab her. She says goodbye to everyone in her own way leaving Stefan last. She kisses him and Stefan stabs her. Katherine collapses and leaves Elena's body.

Stefan and Damon watch over Elena waiting for her to wake up. Meanwhile Caroline and Tyler discuss her sleeping with Klaus. Matt takes Nadia's body to bury it despite Stefan's suggestion to throw her in a ditch. Bonnie is praying to her father at a church when Katherine appears, ready to cross over to the other side via Bonnie. Before she does, she takes the time to reveal to Bonnie that she had already accepted her death sentence before showing up at the Salvatore house, but that did not mean she would cooperate. When Katherine went to Wes' laboratory earlier, she found out that Wes never intended to help Nadia. He had instead extracted werewolf venom from Nadia's wound and used it to enhance the ripper virus. Katherine then injected herself with the virus so that when Elena wakes up, she will be doubly infected.

The episode ends with Elena waking up to resume her life while Katherine prepares to embark into the afterlife; However, when Katherine touches Bonnie nothing happens. She asks Bonnie what is happening but Bonnie does not know. A wind whips up in the church, the doors open and a dark abyss appears. Bonnie says to Katherine that it is not her decision to let her pass to the other side or not and that she cannot help her. Katherine is dragged, screaming, into the darkness.

== Feature music ==
In the "Gone Girl" episode we can hear the songs:

- "White Collar Whiskey" by Emily Wolfe
- "Good Mistake" by Mr. Little Jeans

== Reception ==
=== Ratings ===
In its original American broadcast, "Gone Girl" was watched by 2.19 million; up by 0.16 from the previous episode.

=== Reviews ===
"Gone Girl" received positive reviews.

Carrie Raisler from The A.V. Club gave an A− rate to the episode. "The Vampire Diaries has a strange relationship with death. People die all of the time—largely because they are killed by one of the main characters—and often these deaths are treated with such blithe disinterest that the death becomes almost startling in its inconsequence. But once in a while, the show remembers the finality of death. And when it does, it always knocks the emotion of it out of the park."

Ashley Dominique from Geeked Out Nation gave an A− rate to the episode saying that it "marked the loss of one of the Petrova women in a strong send off."

Stephanie Flasher of TV After Dark gave a B+ rate to the episode saying that it was a good one and pointing the pros of it: "Nina and Olga's performances were phenomenal; Good story development; Enticing cliffhanger; More character developed with Liv."

Matt Richenthal of TV Fanatic rated the episode with 4.1/5 saying that the episode was extremely well done. "We got to hang out with our favorite heroes and heroines and listen to them playfully banter with each other (don't worry, Caroline used a calculator) and not-so-playfully taunt each other (You're a joke, Damon/Says the guy pining for the girl who slept with Klaus.) The Katherine-Nadia farewell was touching, perfectly acted and expertly made viewers feel sympathy for the vampire who was about to finally die." About the ending scene, where Katherine is taken away, Richenthal says that it was awesome the way it was done.

Stephanie Hall from KSiteTV gave a good review to the episode saying that it was easily one of the best of the season. "A significantly more intriguing and monumental episode than last week, "Gone Girl" served as an appropriate sendoff for Katherine and appears to have rejuvenated the underdeveloped virus storyline. It contained more heart than plot, which allowed the audience to truly dwell in the drama and absorb every emotion running through the characters."

Shannon Vestal from Buzzsugar gave a good review to the episode saying that finally, after years of waiting, Katherine is dead. "We thought she was going to die a few episodes ago, but this week, she really, truly dies — and she has a spectacularly appropriate farewell. [...] Maybe now with Katherine gone, we can move on to new, more exciting things, hopefully!"

Christopher Monigle of Starpulse gave a good review saying that season five is rounding into form and that "Gone Girl" is split in two parts. "The first half of the episode concerns the plan to corner Katherine and kill her. [...] The first half of the episode is typical TVD fare: planning, bad execution, a brutal murder by Damon. The second half slows down. The writing and acting become thoughtful rather than reactive. TVD executes slow, thoughtful bits very effectively and movingly, and Nadia’s was very well written and delicately acted."

Alyse Wax from Fearnet also gives a good review saying that it was a very enjoyable episode. "First off, Damon going Dr. Mengele on Wes was a scene of epic beauty. It was swift, it was violent, it was slick. I would not have minded seeing a little more of Damon’s “playtime” with Wes. Katherine going to hell was an obvious choice, but I liked the way they did it. The comedy of her slapping Bonnie’s shoulders, trying to get it to work, then just getting swallowed up by darkness."

Jen from TVovermind says that this was the best episode of the season so far. "It was a pretty great episode, raising even more questions. Will this revolving door of recurring characters ever slow down? It seems we no sooner get used to one new face, and suddenly they’re killed off only to introduce even more new characters."
