= My Brother's Keeper (The Vampire Diaries) =

- The Vampire Diaries episode
- Episode no.: Season 4 Episode 7
- Directed by: Jeffrey Hunt
- Written by: Caroline Dries: Elisabeth R. Finch
- Cinematography by: Dave Perkal
- Editing by: Joel T. Pashby
- Production code: 2J6657
- Original air date: November 29, 2012

Guest appearances
- Susan Walters as Carol Lockwood; Grace Phipps as April Young; Phoebe Tonkin as Hayley Marshall; David Alpay as Atticus Shane; Alyssa Diaz as Kimberley

Episode chronology
← Previous "We All Go a Little Mad Sometimes"	Next → "We'll Always Have Bourbon Street"
- The Vampire Diaries season 4

"My Brother's Keeper" is the seventh episode of the fourth season of the American supernatural teen drama television series The Vampire Diaries, and the 73rd of the series. It aired on The CW on November 29, 2012. The episode was written by co-executive producer Caroline Dries and Elisabeth R. Finch, and directed by Jeffrey Hunt.

== Plot ==
The Miss Mystic Falls pageant is back, and Elena and Caroline help April find a dress to wear. Meanwhile, Caroline calls Stefan and he tells her about Elena's feelings for Damon, which Caroline disapproves of. Klaus shows up shortly afterwards, questioning his trust in him. Damon and Stefan's relationship is strained, but nonetheless, they still search for the cure. Caroline and Elena are suspicious of Shane, who Damon decides to confront. Ever since awakening as a hunter, Jeremy has been having nightmares of killing Elena, and Stefan uses criminals to provide vampires to complete Jeremy's tattoo. Hayley and Tyler work to break the sire bond of Klaus's hybrids.

Caroline is stressed by a favor she owes Klaus, which is a date. Klaus makes her jealous of Hayley and Tyler's friendship, but also charms her and she asks if he ever wanted to be human again. Jeremy's hunter instinct develops to the extent where he grows a hatred for vampires and attacks Stefan. Damon asks why Shane showed up in Mystic Falls in the first place and reveals his vampirism to him. Jeremy arrives at the pageant and attacks Elena, nearly killing her, but she is rescued by Stefan and Matt.

Stefan reveals to Elena he provided vampires for Jeremy to kill and she replies she doesn't want her humanity back if it costs her brother his. Matt moves into her house and Elena decides to stay in the Salvatore House for safety. Stefan then decides to leave, unable to stay in the same house as Elena. It is eventually revealed that Shane and Hayley are working together to break the sire bond with Klaus's hybrids.

Caroline and Stefan begin to believe that Elena is sired to Damon. Later, Elena moves into the boarding house. She and Damon talk for a bit before they stand up and begin to dance by the fireplace. After a moment or so of dancing and holding each other close, they kiss. The two make out in the living room for a while before they go upstairs to Damon's bedroom and have sex for the very first time. The episode ends with Damon and Elena cradling each other's faces in a loving kiss.

== Reception ==
=== Ratings ===
When the episode aired on November 29, 2012, the episode was viewed by 2.86 million American viewers.
