= Michael A. Allowitz =

American television director and producer

- Born: 1964 (age 61–62); United States
- Other names: Michael Allowitz; Mike Allowitz
- Occupations: Television director, producer
- Years active: 1988–present
- Spouse: Natalie Karp
- Children: 3

Michael A. Allowitz (born 1964) is an American television director and producer. He is well known for his work on The CW's The Vampire Diaries and The Originals.

== Career ==
He was an assistant director on films such as The Prom (1992), Saints and Sinner, Slums of Beverly Hills, Cruel Intentions, and Bring It On Again. He was first assistant director on TV series such as The Comeback, In Treatment. He directed 11 episodes of The Vampire Diaries such as "Christmas Through Your Eyes". He also served as director on The Originals, Containment, Freakish and The Flash. From 2017 – 2021 he has directed 11 episodes of Dynasty.
