= The Vampire Diaries season 6 =

The Vampire Diaries
- Season 6
- Season 6 DVD cover
- Showrunner: Julie Plec
- Starring: Nina Dobrev; Paul Wesley; Ian Somerhalder; Steven R. McQueen; Kat Graham; Candice Accola; Zach Roerig; Michael Trevino; Matt Davis; Michael Malarkey
- No. of episodes: 22

Release
- Original network: The CW
- Original release: October 2, 2014 – May 14, 2015

Season chronology
- ← Previous; Season 5 Next → Season 7

The Vampire Diaries, an American supernatural drama, was renewed for a sixth season by The CW on February 13, 2014, and it premiered on October 2, 2014. A majority of the episode titles for this season are named after songs released in 1994 & 1903. The Vampire Diaries was renewed for a seventh season on January 11, 2015, by The CW.

== Cast ==
=== Main ===
- Nina Dobrev as Elena Gilbert
- Paul Wesley as Stefan Salvatore
- Ian Somerhalder as Damon Salvatore
- Steven R. McQueen as Jeremy Gilbert
- Kat Graham as Bonnie Bennett
- Candice Accola as Caroline Forbes
- Zach Roerig as Matt Donovan
- Michael Trevino as Tyler Lockwood
- Matt Davis as Alaric Saltzman
- Michael Malarkey as Enzo St. John

=== Recurring ===
- Jodi Lyn O'Keefe as Jo Laughlin
- Chris Wood as Kai Parker
- Penelope Mitchell as Liv Parker
- Marguerite MacIntyre as Liz Forbes
- Chris Brochu as Luke Parker
- Annie Wersching as Lily Salvatore
- Emily Chang as Ivy
- Gabrielle Walsh as Monique
- Tristin Mays as Sarah Nelson
- Marco James as Liam Davis

=== Special guest ===
- Colin Ferguson as Tripp Cooke

=== Guest ===
- Drew Stephenson as Colin Phelps
- Jayson Warner Smith as Dean
- Christopher Cousins as Joshua Parker
- Chris William Martin as Zach Salvatore (flashback)
- Jason MacDonald as Grayson Gilbert (flashback)
- Erin Beute as Miranda Sommers-Gilbert (voice only)

== Episodes ==
No. overall	No. in season	Title	Directed by	Written by	Original release date	Prod. code	U.S. viewers (millions)
112	1	"I'll Remember"	Jeffrey Hunt	Caroline Dries	October 2, 2014	2J7851	1.81
Four months later, Elena is having a horrible time coping with Damon's death as she returns to Whitmore College for her sophomore year. She is taking drugs that Luke has given her in order to see Damon, but she soon develops side effects that make her violent. Caroline has dropped out of college to find a way to reverse the spell that the Travellers had put on the Mystic Falls border. Tyler adjusts to being human as he begins attending Whitmore while his feelings for Liv grow. Matt gets really worried after Jeremy continues to cope with Bonnie's death by having sex with random girls and drinking. Alaric, after returning, is adjusting to his life as a vampire and works as a professor at Whitmore. Stefan has decided to live a normal life and started working as a mechanic after giving up on finding a way to get Bonnie and Damon back. Elena asks Alaric how he copes with being a vampire and asks him to compel her into forgetting about Damon.
113	2	"Yellow Ledbetter"	Pascal Verschooris	Julie Plec	October 9, 2014	2J7852	1.67
Knowing she needs to come to terms with the loss of Damon, Elena turns to Alaric to help her move on with her life. So that Alaric can compel her to forget she ever loved Damon, Elena has to admit the moment she first realized she loved him. Caroline and Enzo try to convince Stefan not to give up on Damon, but Stefan is determined to start a new life away from everything that reminds him of Damon. Matt worries about Jeremy who is spending time with Sarah, a mysterious girl supposedly from new York, who has recently arrived in Mystic Falls. Elsewhere, Tripp (leader of the community protection program) makes an interesting confession to Matt about his connection to the town. Lastly, with the Other Side destroyed and gone for good, Damon and Bonnie reluctantly band together to uncover the mystery of where they are and how they are going to get back home. Bonnie and Damon discover they are trapped in a time loop, and discover someone is in the house with them.
114	3	"Welcome to Paradise"	Michael Allowitz	Brian Young	October 16, 2014	2J7853	1.83
Still reeling from Enzo murdering his girlfriend Ivy, Stefan compels his boss at the auto repair shop to give him a few days off so that he can hunt him down. Elena seems over the top ecstatic since Alaric compelled her to forget all of her Damon memories. Stefan appears at Whitmore College, surprising Elena, who has just invited Liam to the party at the swimming hole. In the parallel dimension, while Bonnie and Damon are discussing the mysterious crossword puzzle incident during grocery shopping, more strange things happen—food items missing from shelves; the merry-go-round is activated; Damon's car appears in the parking lot, all which lead Damon to discover someone named Kai. In the other world, Stefan attempts to confront Enzo, but Enzo thwarts him and kills a vampire hunter who had followed them into the woods. Kai reveals that he has been following Damon and Bonnie, right before he announces that he wants to kill Damon just as Damon takes a drink of bourbon laced with vervain. Bonnie saves Damon by regaining her magic, and she and Damon capture Kai, who later admits that he faked the attempted killing of Damon to motivate Bonnie to regain her magic. Jeremy's latest fling Sarah disappears. In a diner, Tripp Fell stabs Enzo with a syringe filled with vervain, which Enzo shakes off, right before Stefan stakes him.
115	4	"Black Hole Sun"	Kellie Cyrus	Melinda Hsu Taylor & Neil Reynolds	October 23, 2014	2J7854	1.66
When Damon and Bonnie realize that uncovering a time from Damon's past may provide clues to finding their way back home, Damon is forced to relive one of the worst days of his life. After an awkward run-in with Jo at the hospital, Alaric steps in to help Jeremy get his life together and cope with the loss of Bonnie. In Savannah, Stefan attempts to show Elena what it is like to start over and create a new identity, while unsuspecting Matt finds himself in a disturbing situation when Tripp lets him in on a dark secret. Lastly Stefan, who is desperate to regain some normalcy in his life, is stunned when Ivy shows up as a vampire.
116	5	"The World Has Turned and Left Me Here"	Leslie Libman	Brett Matthews	October 30, 2014	2J7855	1.58
Kai tells Bonnie and Damon to prepare for the eclipse that can bring them back home. Bonnie soon discovers that Kai knew nothing about the spell and kills him. He never was dead, but he needed a Bennett to help him go back home, so he tries to kill Bonnie and Damon once they were close to coming back home. While Bonnie is bleeding on the ground, Damon fights Kai, but Bonnie uses her magic to make sure Damon goes back home. Elena and Liam go to Whitmore College Corn Maze. While there, Tyler accidentally runs over the entire corn maze with a truck due to someone running out in the middle of the street, so Elena and Tyler have to make sure no one dies because then Tyler would unlock his werewolf curse. Stefan tells Caroline to teach Ivy the vampire ropes. Ivy breaks Caroline's neck and Ivy decides to go feed, but did not know how to compel. Ivy gets captured at the end by Tripp. Stefan and Damon reunite.
117	6	"The More You Ignore Me, the Closer I Get"	Garreth Stover	Chad Fiveash & James Stoteraux	November 6, 2014	2J7856	1.59
Damon believes if he sees Elena, all her memories of him will be restored, but Elena does not want to meet him. Alaric asks Elena to see if Jo knows about vampires, and she discovers that Jo is a witch and knows Elena and Alaric are vampires. Tripp captures Damon and try to drive him and Enzo over the Mystic Falls borders. Alaric tries to stop Tripp from crossing the Mystic Falls borders but gets dragged across it himself. While looking for Damon, Enzo, and Alaric, Elena decides she wants her memories back. When they cross the border, Enzo, Damon, and Alaric slowly start to die and get magic stripped off of them. Jo was following Alaric and rescues him, but he comes back alive as human. Stefan rescues Damon and Enzo and later on meets Caroline, who tells him she does not want to be friends anymore. The episode ends with Elena and Damon meeting in her dorm.
118	7	"Do You Remember the First Time?"	Darren Genet	Rebecca Sonnenshine	November 13, 2014	2J7857	1.54
Damon and Elena try to get back her memories with no luck, Elena gives up and crosses the border but Damon grabs her in time that she does not die. Elena only remembers bits and pieces but not enough to love Damon again. Damon decides to let Elena go while dropping her off at her dorm. Stefan and Caroline need to get Tripp back from Enzo before the people who want Tripp back kill Caroline's mom. Enzo secretly turns Tripp into a vampire without Caroline or Stefan knowing. Tripp crosses the Mystic Falls border and dies, while Caroline gets her mom back. Caroline sees that they hurt her mom and along with Stefan, they take Sheriff Forbes to the hospital and while waiting for her, Stefan and Caroline talk about what Enzo said earlier (that Caroline loved Stefan and how he did not notice). They talk and Stefan apologizes for not knowing, which gets Caroline mad. Liam tells Elena that he is close to knowing how the girl who was in the maze recovered so quickly, which makes Elena alarmed since it was her blood that made the girl healed.
119	8	"Fade Into You"	Joshua Butler	Nina Fiore & John Herrera	November 20, 2014	2J7858	1.68
As Caroline and Elena host Thanksgiving at their dorm, Elena seeks ways to confess her vampirism to Liam. Stefan, Damon and Alaric go to Portland to contact the Gemini coven concerning the ascendant whilst trying not to give Elena hope. Kai takes Bonnie to the same location and tells her his parents called him an abomination and tried all they could to keep their home hidden. Damon and Alaric tease Stefan about Caroline's feelings for him prompting Stefan to kick Bonnie's Teddy bear into the air and uncloaking a house. Liam apologizes to Elena for false accusations after Jo had altered Lady Whitmore's medical track. Kai agrees to let Bonnie leave unharmed with his car if she has one last dinner with him. In a surprising turn of events it is revealed that Kai is Jo's twin brother, Luke and Liv are both siblings to them and stem from the same family. Kai killed his four siblings targeting Luke and Liv to be the Covens leader. While searching for answers, Damon meets Kai's father, Joshua, who casts another cloaking spell on him. As Damon wakes Joshua demands to know how he got out the trap of repeated hell and if Kai also knows the how to escape. The twins explain that there can not be two leaders in the coven and on their 22nd birthday one of them has to die. Joshua explains that he can not help Damon bring out Bonnie because if Kai escapes, he will be a problem to the world. He starts a spell to kill Jo and then tries to kill Damon but Stefan arrives in time to fend him off with a magic knife Jo spelled in 1994 while at the same time, Elena saves Jo with her blood much to Liam's shock whom she compels afterwards. Kai explains the logic of his exile to Bonnie, reveals the same spelled knife and sucks out its magic. He then tells Bonnie he does not need her anymore but needs her blood and stabs her. Tyler vows to protect Liv and Stefan tries to make peace with Caroline who hands him a gift. Elena and Damon discuss their relationship. Finally Bonnie recovers from the stab and discovers Kai took the car and left her there.
120	9	"I Alone"	Kellie Cyrus	Brian Young & Holly Brix	December 4, 2014	2J7859	1.49
Damon compels Alaric to do whatever he has to do to get the ascendant from Jo. After obtaining it, Liv sends Damon and Elena back to 1994 while Elena wonders why Jo agreed to give them the ascendant which is the only thing that is protecting her from her brother. Arriving in 1994, Damon and Elena page Bonnie and are able to speak to her and tell her that they are bringing her home. In their conversation Bonnie tells them that Kai stabbed her to get her blood and fears that Kai might be free. Back in the Mystic Falls, Stefan meets a girl claiming to be Sarah, the daughter of their uncle, but it is revealed that she is actually an impostor who goes by the name Monique. Stefan knows about the real Sarah and where she is all these years since he has been watching over her whole life. He compels Monique to forget she ever knew Sarah and to leave Mystic Falls, because he does not want Damon, or anyone else, to know about Sarah. Enzo suspects that Stefan hides something and kills Monique because Stefan refuses to tell him. Kai kills a cab driver and once he arrives in Mystic Falls he finds Liv. He steals some of her magic and tries to kill her but Tyler comes in time and saves her. In the process, Liv is forced to bring Damon and Elena back to the present without Bonnie. Jo finds out that the ascendant is gone and confronts Alaric, being the only other person who knew where she kept it, but Alaric swears he did not take it. Jo tells him that it might be possible that he took it but he does not remember because he was compelled to forget. Kai finds Damon and Elena in the cemetery and destroys the ascendant and afterwards he goes to Tyler and asks him to help him merge with Jo to keep Liv alive.
121	10	"Christmas Through Your Eyes"	Michael Allowitz	Caroline Dries	December 11, 2014	2J7860	1.82
Seen in flashbacks ranging from 2007 to 2009, high school students Elena, Bonnie and Caroline are decorating the school Christmas tree and enjoying a simpler time. In the present day, Kai kidnaps Jo and with Liv and Luke's help, he locates the knife where Jo had hidden her magic and forces Jo to take it back by stabbing her, but she tells him that for that to work she has to be willing to do it because she put it there also willingly. Luke leaves saying that he does not want to be a part of Jo's murder. Jo tells Kai that she may bleed out if he does not do anything and that all his efforts will be vain, so he leaves to go fetch some bandages and leaves Liv with the mission to find a way to give Jo her magic back. The sheriff is brought to the hospital where it is revealed that she has a tumor on her brain, and Stefan says to Caroline that she will die because vampire's blood cannot heal her. Jeremy and Matt trap Enzo with the intent of killing him but Matt wants to kill him slowly, which Jeremy finds a little harsh but Matt is determined. Liv tries to convince Jo to take her magic telling her that she may be able to beat Kai in the merge because of how well she has done without magic for 18 years. Kai comes back and tries to kill Liv which forces Jo to take back her magic. Damon and Alaric came to the rescue to find out that Jo has her magic back. They trick Kai and send him out of border where Alaric puts a gun on his temple but Jo comes out and asks him not to kill him because she might be able to beat him in the merge, and that she needs a little time to get strong. They chained him in Mystic Falls where he cannot use any magic but after a while, Kai drains the magic from the travelers' spell, something that also breaks the spell surrounding Mystic Falls. Matt brings Enzo past the border of Mystic Falls but Enzo cannot die due to Kai absorbing all the magic. Enzo turns on Matt telling him that he will let him live if he helps him take away all things that makes Stefan happy. Damon and Stefan come back to their home in Mystic Falls, and when Elena arrives, Damon cannot see her because of Kai's cloaking spell. Kai kidnaps Elena.
122	11	"Woke Up with a Monster"	Paul Wesley	Melinda Hsu Taylor	January 22, 2015	2J7861	1.63
Kai has captured Elena and holds her as hostage in the Mystic Grill after killing the owner. He plans to practice his new found abilities on Elena to master his new magic. Caroline and Stefan start to look for a doctor who could cure Liz, and get to Duke. On the way Stefan goes to the art exhibition held by his niece, the true Sarah Nelson, but he is followed by Enzo. Kai brings Elena to high school and melts her daylight ring. Elena manages to escape Kai and phones Damon who comes with Liv to save her. However, Liv is abducted by her brother, Luke who comes to take her home. Needing a witch to perform a cloaking spell, Jo steps in to help Damon and they both enter the building. They manage to save Elena but Jo is becoming weaker and Kai spots them all. After learning from a doctor that her mom has no treatment, Caroline decides to inject her blood to another cancer patient. The aftermath is a well-looking person who seems to have defeated the tumor. The patient is feeling alright again so Caroline and Stefan rush back to Mystic Falls. In the school, Kai tricks Damon to stab Elena and goes after Jo. Alaric and Jeremy come in to save Jo just in time and they decide to keep Kai under sedative. Once back home, Caroline reveals to her mother that only vampire blood can heal her and puts some in her tea. The episode ends with the patient slowly dying in a brutal way, just while Liz is drinking Caroline's blood, with whom she now believes can be saved.
123	12	"Prayer for the Dying"	Jeffrey Hunt	Brett Matthews & Rebecca Sonnenshine	January 29, 2015	2J7862	1.47
Caroline is woken up by Colin, the patient she gave her blood to. Stefan and Caroline learn that he has become a vampire. Liv and Luke's father arrives to celebrate their birthday. They propose him to avoid the merge because none of them wants the other to die. In the hospital, Caroline and Stefan realize that Colin is a vampire but is not cured of his cancer. The tumor expanded and while he is a vampire, he can still feel the pain of the tumor growing. Caroline's mom realises that she will go through the same as Caroline fed her her blood. Jo suggests a full blood transfusion but it fails. Tyler, who now knows the twins are ready for the merge (as they are 22 years old), tries to wake Kai up, but is stopped by Damon. Kai helps Liz taking all the magic from her body but with the condition that the merge is set for that night. Liz is having a heart attack and Elena is helping her. Mr Parker deceives the twins and begins to merge them, but Tyler comes just in time and hits him. Luke promises Liv he will come back and go and look for Kai. Kai and Jo begin the merge, although she is not ready yet. Luke stops the merge and convinces Kai to do it with him. Damon compels a doctor to save Liz's life, but she dies. Caroline arrives in that moment and cries on her mother's body. Before dying, Liz has a vision in which she sees her daughter with a bloody face, and then mysteriously wakes up. After the merge, Jo witnesses Luke and Kai fainting. While Jo is crying and holding her brother in her arms, he dies and she realizes that Kai has won the merge.
124	13	"The Day I Tried to Live"	Pascal Verschooris	Chad Fiveash & James Stoteraux	February 5, 2015	2J7863	1.61
It is Bonnie's birthday, and Jeremy doesn't want to celebrate but is convinced by Damon and Elena to do so. The three of them attempt to piece the broken ascendant back together in attempt to send Bonnie a message, but they have a disturbing realization. Bonnie can't take the solitude anymore and is planning to commit suicide. With Kai's help, Jeremy enters the world to try to stop Bonnie, who is in the garage and starting to poison herself with gas from the car. While saying goodbye to her friends via video, Bonnie realizes that she can't give up yet but is too weak to open the garage door and save herself. Jeremy manages to open the door, and Bonnie survives. Stefan uncovers a secret about his great-niece Sarah Salvatore while Enzo wants to interfere with help from Matt for an alternate motive. Caroline is trying to cope with the hardships in her life, especially her mother's illness, so Stefan keeps a close eye on her. Lastly, Jeremy contemplates leaving Mystic Falls for good and realizes it might be time to move on with his life.
125	14	"Stay"	Chris Grismer	Brian Young & Caroline Dries	February 12, 2015	2J7864	1.52
With help from Elena and Damon, Jeremy graduates high school months earlier and is leaving town to go to art school. Caroline, on the other hand has Stefan help her surprise her mother with a vacation while the sheriff is with Damon attempting to solve an old unsolved case: the Gilberts' accident. Elena and Jeremy get stoned together while bonding and talking about their old memories. Matt is still being blackmailed by Enzo, but he is starting to develop feelings for Sarah. Enzo calls Matt and threatens to kill Jeremy, who he has pinned down, unless Matt takes Sarah to a certain tunnel. Matt reluctantly goes on a walk with Sarah to the tunnel, and Enzo purposely hits Matt with a car. While Sarah panics, Enzo tells her to stay calm and gives Matt some of his blood. As Jeremy leaves, it is revealed that he lied and instead of going to art school, he is going to go hunt vampires and Alaric is the only one who knows about it. Liz realizes that the events surrounding the Gilberts' accident were natural and that she had been hoping for a supernatural reason so she could have someone to blame. Stefan and Caroline are setting up Liz's room together and the two of them kiss on the porch. Liz's condition rapidly deteriorates and she has to go back to the hospital, where she lies unconscious. Caroline rushes to the hospital and is upset because she didn't get to say goodbye, but Stefan helps her by suggesting that she goes inside her mom's mind, which is what she does and with that the Sheriff dies.
126	15	"Let Her Go"	Julie Plec	Julie Plec	February 19, 2015	2J7865	1.41
Bonnie has her magic back thanks to Damon's message and is planning to return home that night. Kai is dying because he merged with Luke instead of Jo. He tells Jo that unless she gives him her magic, they and the rest of the coven will die and the prison worlds will collapse. Damon is struggling to write Liz a eulogy and is having flashbacks to his mother's funeral. He also tells Caroline that it will only get harder for her later after everyone expects her to move on. Before Liz's funeral, Caroline tries to ask Stefan how he feels about her, but he responds by saying that he'll talk to her about it later. The funeral takes place: Damon gives the eulogy, Caroline sings, and the police honor Liz one last time. The moving display prompts Matt to get an application to join the police for both himself and Tyler, who has been drinking heavily since his breakup with Liv. Jo decides to give Kai her magic, and as this is taking place, Bonnie's prison world shifts in and out of the Salvatore home in 1903, when the aurora borealis was taking place. Right before she is about to return home, she sees a woman who asks her who she is, but before she can learn more, she returns to the normal world. Kai feels healthy after receiving Jo's magic, but before he leaves, he tells her that she is pregnant. Alaric proposes to her, telling her that he had already been planning to propose before the news, and she accepts. After Liz's funeral, Caroline returns home, but Elena follows her and confronts her after realizing that Caroline plans to turn off her humanity to stop her pain and prevent what Damon warned her about. Caroline decides to go through with it anyway and breaks Elena's neck. Stefan realizes that what he feels for Caroline could turn into something deeper and goes to her house, but he sees Elena lying on the ground. Damon reunites with Bonnie, and when Bonnie shows him the video she accidentally took while she was escaping, Damon realizes that the woman Bonnie saw was his mother.
127	16	"The Downward Spiral"	Ian Somerhalder	Brian Young & Caroline Dries	March 12, 2015	2J7866	1.30
After switching off her humanity, Caroline makes out with Liam outside of a bar and feeds off of him. She tells Bonnie and Elena that she will avoid killing anyone if they give her a year to live freely without her pain, and they initially agree. Kai refuses to give Damon information about his mother unless he helps Kai apologize to Bonnie in order to alleviate Kai's guilt. Caroline invites Liam and Enzo to a rave, and Elena, Bonnie, and Stefan come to confront Caroline. Damon calls Bonnie, but after she refuses to talk to Kai, Damon and Kai show up and Kai attempts to apologize to her. Bonnie is coping with traumatic memories from her time in the prison world and is furious with Damon for forcing her to see Kai, who she believes is lying. After using her magic to punish Damon by forcing him to endure the wounds that Kai inflicted on her, she realizes that her experiences have changed her and finally calls Jeremy, telling him that she needs time to work things out. Stefan admits his feelings to Caroline and begs her to switch on her humanity; for a moment Caroline wavers and he knows that there is a chance to bring back the old Caroline. Kai reveals that Damon's mother is a vampire and was imprisoned by the Gemini coven after she faked her own death and went on a worldwide killing spree. In retaliation for Stefan's attempt to break through to her, Caroline kidnaps Sarah Salvatore and compels Liam to perform 'surgery' on her in the form of removing her organs. She tells Stefan that she will spare Sarah's life if Stefan turns off his humanity. Elena manages to stop Liam from cutting out Sarah's heart just as Stefan agrees to Caroline's demands and shuts off his humanity.
128	17	"A Bird in a Gilded Cage"	Joshua Butler	Neil Reynolds	March 19, 2015	2J7867	1.59
After the previous night, Sarah is being kept in the hospital. Alaric and Jo contemplate baby names. Jo tells Alaric to be a father for 18 years and then he can run around killing vampires. Kai and Bonnie take Damon and Elena to the 1903 prison world to get the Salvatore's mother. Bonnie says she will find the ascendant but ends up hurting Kai so he can feel the pain she felt. When they are about to go back to real time, Kai gets left behind because Bonnie wants him to feel loneliness. With both of their humanities off, Caroline and Stefan feed on a girl and afterwards have sex. After Bonnie interrupts Damon and Elena's make out session, she forgives him and gives him the Cure to Vampirism.
129	18	"I Never Could Love Like That"	Leslie Libman	Story by : Matthew D'Ambrosio; Teleplay by : Chad Fiveash & James Storeaux	April 16, 2015	2J7868	1.35
Caroline and Stefan have still switched off their humanity. They are terrorizing and killing the people at Whitmore's. Matt and Tyler are being tortured by them, Matt ends up in the hospital. Elena and Damon are having a pleasant morning. They're enjoying breakfast made by Lily. Damon has come up with a plan to bring Stefan and Caroline back which involves Lily (the Salvatore's mother) convincing Stefan to turn his humanity back on and then Stefan can convince Caroline to switch it back on too. Enzo has taken Sarah from the hospital and tries to bring her to the Salvatore house, but when he sees Lily, he runs away in shock. Turns out that when Enzo was living in South Hampton, he was suffering from consumption until he met Lily, who fed him with vampire blood so then after he died (of consumption) he became a vampire. In the present day, Lily tells Damon that she will help him to bring back Stefan but in return he has to give her the ascendant so she can bring her "other family" back. When Lily and Damon go to the school bar, she says just the right words to get Stefan to flip his switch (even though Damon told her exactly what to say). Now Stefan has to track down Caroline and get her to flip the switch, too. Back at the hospital, Matt refuses Elena's blood. Once he's stitched up by conventional medicine, he talks to Elena about how much he hates vampires and doesn't want to rely on them. Damon finds Elena outside of the hospital and they talk about life and how Elena misses being human and she's sad because she is a vampire and she will never be able to create a family. Finally, Jo explains how bad it is that Damon gave Lily the ascendant because Lily's "family members" are all siphoners, just like Kai, but were turned into vampires. Siphoners do not have magic of their own so must siphon it from other sources. They retain that ability even after transition, and they have an infinite amount of magic to siphon from themselves. This was considered as an aberration of nature and they are perceived to be ruthless and dangerous, so the Gemini Coven locked them inside the prison world in 1903.
130	19	"Because"	Geoffrey Wing Shotz	Melinda Hsu Taylor	April 23, 2015	2J7869	1.37
Stefan with Damon and Elena's help, tries to switch Caroline's humanity back on. Caroline still believes Stefan has no humanity while they're locked inside a room and being tortured. Elena is convinced that Caroline will turn her feelings on by reading a letter her mom had written before she had died, but she doesn't care and oblige Stefan to burn it down. Elena is upset because she didn't expect Caroline to do that and finds help in Damon, with whom she shares her ideal future. Bonnie is set to have a meeting with Lily at the Mystic Grill. Matt tries and help her friend by taking time with Lily, but soon Enzo arrives and has a chat with her. Lily explains to him that she didn't abandon him, but she left him because she was locked in the prison world the night she had turned him into a vampire. Before Bonnie arrives, the two leave. Bonnie takes the Ascendant right before Lily can take it. Stefan provokes visions of Liz in Caroline's mind and then she wakes up realizing the whole torture was a vision. Stefan enters in her mind again sharing a real memory of Liz giving him the letter that now is burned down, and Caroline turns her feelings on again when she understands she made an irreparable mistake. Guiltstricken over what they did, she tells him she just needs to be by herself. Lily wants the Ascendant and forces Damon to find it or she will burn the cure. Bonnie doesn't want to give him the Ascendant and convinces Damon that the cure is not the right solution for Elena. While Damon thinks the cure is being burned up, Elena shows up with the cure. Lily left it for Elena to find so that his real punishment would be Elena knowing he had the cure and didn’t offer it to her. Lily leaves the house and turns back into a ripper. She breaks down afterwards and calls Enzo for help. The episode ends with Damon telling Elena he will take the cure with her, if she wants to take it.
131	20	"I'd Leave My Happy Home for You"	Jesse Warn	Brett Matthews & Rebecca Sonnenshine	April 30, 2015	2J7870	1.21
Jo and Alaric celebrate their last night before the marriage. He and Damon discuss Damon's proposal to Elena of becoming human with her. Matt fights with Tyler, asking why he isn't enthusiastic about becoming a cop. Tyler says that he is too afraid to become a werewolf again. Enzo finds Stefan on the phone to Caroline's voice-mail, begging her to come home. He tells Stefan that his mother is potentially turning into a ripper again and that he needs to intervene. Alaric finds Matt alone and Matt confronts him, urging him to take Jo and leave for their own good. Stefan finds his mother and stops her from feeding on someone. They talk and Stefan realizes that she can't be helped the easy way and prepares to vervain her, however, Lily notices that he is lying and vervains him instead, feeding on a waitress and terrifying all the customers at the bar. Enzo arrives at the bar and tells Stefan Damon's plan. Lily finds Bonnie and Jo and threatens Bonnie as she is the reason she can't get her people back. After stabbing Bonnie, Lily finds out Jo is pregnant with twins, so her coven will try to take the babies and make them merge, rendering Kai useless. Damon is with Elena and she takes the cure on the porch, telling him she loves him. As human, Alaric's compulsion is gone and she gains her memories back. Stefan then calls Damon to let him know that Lily is free and now would be a bad time to take the cure. As he's telling Damon this, Lily snaps his neck, leaving Elena shocked. Elena stabs her in the eye with a brooch and runs into The Grill. She hides in the tunnels and Lily leaves, angry. Alaric goes to the hospital to check on Jo and Bonnie and tells her to go somewhere the coven can't find them. Stefan and Damon find Lily and lock her up in the cell in the Salvatore house. Damon finds Elena in front of the fireplace and she confronts him, telling him that she had asked him before to take the cure with him and he had refused, saying that to be human would be to have the most miserable life in existence. Elena says that she isn't going to let him take the cure until everyone has tried to talk him out of it, to ensure that to be human is what he wants and that he isn't doing it just to keep Elena. The episode ends with Kai making dinner for the six vampire/witch hybrids, saying that today is the day that they're getting out of the prison world.
132	21	"I'll Wed You in the Golden Summertime"	Michael Allowitz	Brian Young	May 7, 2015	2J7871	1.32
Bonnie has nightmares about Kai and Lily. Bonnie, Elena and Jo prepare for the wedding. Jo freaks out over her lost slippers and her wedding coordinator who was unavailable at the last minute. Caroline offers to help Jo as wedding coordinator. Stefan takes Damon to his home where he stayed while Damon was trapped in prison world, to know whether he really wants to become human or not. Enzo brought an MP3 player for Lily to listen and while Bonnie came to Lily's locked cell, Lily squeezed Bonnie's throat, leaving bruises. Lily broke out of the locked room at the mansion and an unseen force gripped Bonnie and Matt's throat, making them faint. Stefan came back alone & talked with Caroline about their complicated status. In the barn which is prepared for the wedding, Elena is approached by Damon who said he had thought this through and he chose to be human not for her, but for them and he would grasp any chance to be with her and they kissed. The wedding begins and while Alaric and Jo are exchanging vows, Kai appears and attacks. Jo is killed, Elena is knocked unconscious, the wedding guests are attacked by debris, and chaos ensues.
133	22	"I'm Thinking of You All the While"	Chris Grismer	Julie Plec & Caroline Dries	May 14, 2015	2J7872	1.44
In the aftermath of the wedding massacre, Jo is dead but Alaric survives. Kai casts a spell linking Elena and Bonnie's lives, rendering Elena unconscious while Bonnie is alive and tries to force Damon to choose Bonnie or Elena. Damon chooses to rip off Kai's head, killing him for good but leaving Elena unconscious and semi-dead for the duration of Bonnie's life. In a series of visions or dreams, Elena and her friends and family say their goodbyes. Liv, dying, urges Tyler to end her life and turn back into a werewolf so that he might live. Stefan pledges to Caroline that he will wait for her. Enzo and Lily discover that Kai had indeed brought Lily's "family" of vampire witches out of the 1903 prison world with him and to modern-day Mystic Falls. At the end, time flashes an unknown amount forward. Matt, a police officer, is seen cruising through a destroyed Mystic Falls at night while Damon stands on the clock tower, watching the town.

== Production ==
=== Development ===
Season 6 was officially announced on February 13, 2014.

=== Casting ===
The regular lineup returned from Season 5.

It was announced, right after the finale of Season 5, that Matthew Davis's character, Alaric Saltzman, who left the show at the end of Season 3 after being killed, would return as a regular for Season 6. On May 16, 2014, it was revealed that Michael Malarkey, who portrays Enzo St. John, would become a series regular in season 6.

On July 12, 2014, Gabrielle Walsh was confirmed to have been cast in the guest role of Sarah; two days later on July 14, Colin Ferguson was cast in the guest role of Tripp; and on July 16, Emily Chang was revealed to have been cast in the role of Ivy.

On April 6, 2015, Nina Dobrev announced her departure from the series at season's end on her Instagram page. There was immediate speculation as to whether the series would continue without Dobrev, but the continuation was confirmed. It was also announced that Michael Trevino would also vacate the role of Tyler Lockwood after season 6.

== Critical response ==
Based on 16 reviews, the sixth season holds an 81% on Rotten Tomatoes with an average rating of 7.71 out of 10. The site's critics' consensus reads, "The sixth season of The Vampire Diaries attempts to give Elena the fondest farewell amid the murderous melodrama."
