= Welcome to Paradise (The Vampire Diaries) =

- The Vampire Diaries episode
- Episode no.: Season 6 Episode 3
- Directed by: Michael Allowitz
- Written by: Brian Young
- Production code: 2J7853
- Original air date: October 16, 2014

Guest appearances
- Colin Ferguson (Tripp Fell); Penelope Mitchell (Liv Parker); Chris Brochu (Luke Parker); Emily C. Chang (Ivy); Gabrielle Walsh (Monique); Marco James (Liam Davis); Chris Wood (Kai Parker)

Episode chronology
← Previous "Yellow Ledbetter"	Next → "Black Hole Sun"
- The Vampire Diaries season 6

"Welcome to Paradise" is the 3rd episode of the sixth season of the American series The Vampire Diaries and the series' 114th episode overall. "Welcome to Paradise" was originally aired on October 16, 2014, on The CW. The episode was written by Brian Young and directed by Michael Allowitz.

== Plot ==
Stefan (Paul Wesley) wants to return to Mystic Falls to find Enzo (Michael Malarkey) to kill him because Enzo killed Ivy (Emily C. Chang). Stefan goes to the car garage where he works and asks his boss, Dean (Jayson Warner Smith), for few days off. When Dean denies it, Stefan tells him the whole truth, compels him and asks him to bury Ivy.

Elena (Nina Dobrev) organizes a party outside Mystic Falls and she invites everyone, including one of the volunteers, Liam (Marco James), from the hospital. Stefan arrives at the college and Elena invites him as well. Stefan refuses to go but when he hears that Enzo will be there too, he changes his mind. In the meantime, Matt (Zach Roerig) invites one of the Community Protection Squad members, Jay (Matthew Barnes), to the party. At the party, Elena, Caroline (Candice Accola), Matt and Tyler (Michael Trevino) meet to remember the old times and celebrate but none of them seem to have fun.

Later on, Liam kisses Elena while Caroline compels a girl to bring some ice at the party. Jeremy (Steven R. McQueen) talks with the girl a little bit later and realizes that the moment she entered Mystic Falls, the compulsion wore off, which means everyone who was compelled and then entered the borders, including Sarah (Gabrielle Walsh) who was attacked by Elena, remembers everything. Jeremy finds Elena and Caroline and tells them about Sarah and that they have to find her before it is too late. They search for her but they cannot find her anywhere.

Stefan finds Enzo and attacks him. While the two fight, Jay comes and tries to kill Stefan but Enzo kills him first. Despite saving his life, Stefan still wants to kill him when Caroline appears to stop him and ask what is wrong. She finds out about Enzo killing Ivy and tells Stefan that killing Enzo will not bring her back. She then asks him to stay but he does not listen to her and leaves, while Elena listens to their conversation. From that conversation Elena realizes that Caroline has feelings about Stefan and when she asks her later about it, Caroline does not deny it. In the meantime, Enzo takes Jay's body to Matt's truck telling him and Tyler that Jay was a vampire hunter and now he has to bury him.

Damon (Ian Somerhalder) and Bonnie (Kat Graham) are still in the 1994 and Damon does not believe there is a way for them to get out since he does not believe that someone else is there with them despite all the signs. Bonnie tries to convince him that he is wrong and to have hope but they end up fighting. After the fight, Bonnie leaves Damon alone who gets back to the supermarket to get some bourbon and finds Kai (Chris Wood) there. Damon asks who he is and what he wants. Kai says he wants to kill him the exact moment Damon drinks the bourbon and realizes that there is vervain in it. Just when Kai is about to kill Damon, Bonnie arrives and saves him using her magic.

Bonnie and Damon take Kai to the house and tie him up and when he wakes up they ask him why he wants to kill Damon. Kai says that this was never his intention but he did it on purpose to give Bonnie a motivation to get her magic back. Kai also informs them that Bonnie's magic will take them out of there.

The episode ends with Enzo getting into a bar and Tripp (Colin Ferguson) is also there. Tripp attacks Enzo by injecting him with vervain. Enzo can fight vervain and attacks him back but before he kills him, Stefan arrives and shoots him with wooden stakes. Stefan introduces himself to Tripp as one of the members of the founding families and tells him that Enzo killed Jay. When Stefan moves on to kill Enzo, Tripp stops him by telling him that he has his own way to do it.

== Feature music ==
In the episode "Welcome to Paradise" we can hear the songs:

- "Something to Believe" by Cartel
- "Say Anything" by Ashley Nite
- "I Swear" by All-4-One
- "Bad Habit" by The Kooks
- "Run" by The Maine

== Reception ==
=== Ratings ===
In its original American broadcast, "Welcome to Paradise" was watched by 1.83 million; up by 0.16 from the previous episode.

=== Reviews ===
"Welcome to Paradise" received mixed reviews.

Stephanie Flasher from TV After Dark gave the episode a B− rating saying that the episode was a nice change of pace from the previous ones. Flasher also praises Michael Allowitz's job saying that his directing was exceptional and captured emotion in each scene. "Nice episode with a few surprising reveals in Bonnie and Damon land and nice to see the gang all together at the swimming hole. Nice cliffhanger to keep viewers interested and likely to tune in next week."

Rebecca Jane Stokes of Den of Geek rated the episode with 4/5 saying that the show nailed it this week.

Ashley Dominique from Geeked Out Nation rated the episode with 7/10. "Despite a number of events moving the plot forward, "Welcome to Paradise" still managed to come off slow. That said, this season has managed to set up some interesting plot lines if they can keep the focus on them not relationships."

Leigh Raines of TV Fanatic rated the episode with 3/5 saying that it made her feel sad and compared to last week's, it was not as much enjoyable.

Caroline Preece from Den of Geek gave a good review to the episode saying that the episode reminded her the old Vampire Diaries. "The final cliff-hanger may have been designed to show Stefan as slipping into his old Ripper ways, but it actually reminded me a lot of the old Vampire Diaries. This used to be a show that had its characters firmly planted in a grey area that felt both dangerous and sympathetic, with no easy way to differentiate between good and evil people. It feels like we’re there again, but now with characters we know so much better."

Staphanie Hall of K Site TV gave a mixed review to the episode saying that the episode felt like a season one episode in both good and bad way. "On the bright side, it was simple, easy to follow, entertaining, and emotional. On the bad side, the teen party storyline has been beaten to death, and this episode added nothing new to the topic."
