= The World Has Turned and Left Me Here =

- The Vampire Diaries episode
- Episode no.: Season 6 Episode 5
- Directed by: Leslie Libman
- Written by: Brett Matthews
- Production code: 2J7855
- Original air date: October 30, 2014

Guest appearances
- Colin Ferguson (Tripp Fell); Penelope Mitchell (Liv Parker); Jodi Lyn O'Keefe (Jo Laughlin-Parker); Emily C. Chang (Ivy); Marco James as (Liam Davis); Chris Wood (Kai Parker)

Episode chronology
← Previous "Black Hole Sun"	Next → "The More You Ignore Me, the Closer I Get"
- The Vampire Diaries season 6

"The World Has Turned and Left Me Here" is the 5th episode of the sixth season of the American series The Vampire Diaries and the series' 116th episode overall. "The World Has Turned and Left Me Here" was originally aired on October 30, 2014, on The CW. The episode was written by Brett Matthews and directed by Leslie Libman.

== Plot ==
Tripp (Colin Ferguson) calls Stefan (Paul Wesley) to thank him for turning in Enzo (Michael Malarkey) and informs him that he is trying to get out of him all the information he knows about vampires. Enzo told him that there is a vampire in Savannah, where Stefan is, and that leads Stefan to get back to Mystic Falls with Ivy (Emily C. Chang) to avoid the vampire hunters. Stefan arrives at Caroline's (Candice Accola) dorm and asks her help with Ivy. Caroline tries to keep Ivy in the dorm but Ivy snaps her neck and gets away. When Caroline wakes up, she tries to reach Stefan while she is out searching for Ivy, but he is not answering his phone.

Ivy finds a guy and attacks him but she manages to stop feeding on him before she kills him. She tries to compel him but she does not know how to do it. To make sure that she will not kill him, she asks him to run away. In the meantime, Stefan listens Caroline's messages and comes back. When Caroline asks him where he has been all day, he admits that he was on his way out of town. Caroline is shocked that he would leave town leaving Ivy with her. Angry, she asks him to leave and then Ivy calls for her help.

Elena (Nina Dobrev) invites Liam (Marco James) to the annual "Homecoming Corn Maze" party as her date. She also convinces Alaric (Matt Davis) and Jo (Jodi Lyn O'Keefe) to go since they both need it but they have no idea that Elena planned it this way to set them up. With everyone being in the corn maze, the guy that Ivy attacked jumps in front of Tyler's (Michael Trevino) car and Tyler, on his attempt to avoid him, drives through the corn maze injuring many people, including the guy who jumped in front of him. Tyler is terrified and calls Elena to tell her that he was the one driving the car and he needed her to heal the person he injured. Elena tells him that there are many injured people and Tyler does not know what to do.

Jo and Alaric try to help those who got injured while Liam and Elena do the same. Liam finds a girl who is badly injured and asks Elena's help. Elena tells him that she can handle it and he should go to help others. When Liam leaves, she feeds the girl her blood healing her and then compels her to forget about it. On their way out, Liam sees the girl alive and well and gets suspicious of what happened. When he asks Elena about it, Elena denies to tell him the truth and kisses him as a distraction.

Meanwhile, Liv (Penelope Mitchell) finds Tyler and tries to help him. When they find out that there is nothing they can do to save him, Tyler is desperate since his curse will be activated again, but Liv decides to kill the guy before he bleeds to death, so she will be the one who killed him and not Tyler. Back at the hospital, Jo confess her feelings to Alaric but Alaric compels her to forget about him. The compulsion though does not work on her and Jo kisses him before she leaves. Caroline is on her way to find Ivy but Tripp gets to her before Caroline. He shoots her with vervain and takes her away while Caroline watches from her car in shock.

Back in 1994, Damon (Ian Somerhalder) tries to convince Bonnie (Kat Graham) that it is fine to take Kai (Chris Wood) with them because they will kill him the moment they go back but Bonnie does not agree to free him. When she realizes that Kai does not know the spell, she kills him and tries to find the spell on her own in her grandmother's Grimoire. Bonnie finds the spell and she and Damon get ready to get back home but Kai, who did not die, appears and shoots Bonnie with an arrow. Damon and Kai start to fight and when Bonnie realizes that she will not make it, she uses her magic to at least send Damon back leaving herself behind with Kai.

The episode ends with Stefan going to the Salvatore crypt and talking alone about his dead family and Damon. While he is there, Damon appears telling him he is alive and back and the two brothers reunite.

== Feature music ==
In the episode "The World Has Turned and Left Me Here" we can hear the songs:

- "Sun Goes Out" by Daniel Ellsworth & The Great Lakes
- "Move Up" by The TVC
- "Wasted" by Tiësto (vocals by Matthew Koma)
- "Wait" by M83
- "Follow Me" by Jessarae

== Reception ==
=== Ratings ===
In its original American broadcast, "The World Has Turned and Left Me Here" was watched by 1.58 million; down by 0.08 from the previous episode.

=== Critical reception ===
"The World Has Turned and Left Me Here" received positive reviews.

Stephanie Flasher from TV After Dark gave the episode an A− rating saying that the episode was pretty solid and "took viewers on emotional journey filled with ups, downs and some shocking twists. Also it had a nice cliffhanger with the fate of several characters in question."

Natalie Woods of TV and film review rated the episode with 9/10 saying that she was impressed with it. "I feel like it’s still a new show. This season, opposed to the last, seems to be getting back to its roots and has felt more like the first couple of seasons which concentrated on the main characters instead of crazy newbies like the Travelers and Doppelgängers. With those two behind us, the show has revitalized and is much easier to watch."

Rebecca Jane Stokes from Den of Geek rated the episode with 4/5 saying: "my heart was otherwise engaged to the fullest. That’s because the Delena drama is moving forward. [...] Now that this engine is clearly moving forward, it feels like the entire season has picked up speed."

Ashley Dominique of Geeked Out Nation rated the episode with 6.9/10 saying that the episode "made some strange moves to make multiple small plot progressions. However, we did finally see someone make it out of the loop."

Caroline Preece of Den of Geek gave a good review to the episode saying that it was another great one that "continues its winning streak with another episode that harks back to the show's early, great days." Preece pointed out that the writes having Liv put down the injured guy so Tyler's curse will not be activate, was "brilliant".

Jen from TV Overmind gave a good review to the episode stating that the writers did not disappoint with the brothers reunion scene and it could not have been better.
