= Black Hole Sun (The Vampire Diaries) =

- The Vampire Diaries episode
- Episode no.: Season 6 Episode 4
- Directed by: Kellie Cyrus
- Written by: Melinda Hsu Taylor; Neil Reynolds
- Production code: 2J7854
- Original air date: October 23, 2014

Guest appearances
- Colin Ferguson (Tripp Fell); Marguerite MacIntyre (Liz Forbes); Jodi Lyn O'Keefe (Jo Laughlin-Parker); Emily C. Chang (Ivy); Gabrielle Walsh (Monique); Chris Wood (Kai Parker); Chris William Martin (Zach Salvatore)

Episode chronology
← Previous "Welcome to Paradise"	Next → "The World Has Turned and Left Me Here"
- The Vampire Diaries season 6

"Black Hole Sun" is the 4th episode of the sixth season of the American series The Vampire Diaries and the series' 115th episode overall. "Black Hole Sun" was originally aired on October 23, 2014, on The CW. The episode was written by Melinda Hsu Taylor and Neil Reynolds and directed by Kellie Cyrus.

== Plot ==
Back in the present, Stefan wants to leave Mystic Falls to continue his life, but Elena wants him to prove to her that he is indeed happy and then she will accept his decision. While sitting in a snack/bar, Stefan proposes to her in front of everyone, showing her how they can get new identities and new lives and start over. When Elena leaves, Stefan gets into a fight with a guy letting him beat him up. Elena comes back to take her jacket and stops the fight, compels the guy and sends him home. When she tells Stefan that she does not agree with his coping methods and asks for explanations, Stefan tell her that everyone has their own to move on. He tells her what she asked Alaric (Matthew Davis) to do and that she removed all her good memories about Damon just because she could not handle his death. Elena does not want to believe him and when she gets home, she asks Alaric if it is true. Alaric gives her a diary of hers where she wrote everything about her decision and when he asks her if she want her memories back, she tells him no.

In the past, Bonnie and Damon discover that Kai killed several of his younger brothers and sisters and that’s why he is trapped with them. It is a jail that his family, a coven of witches, created for him. He himself doesn’t have magic, but he has the ability to siphon magic from other witches, at least temporarily. He knows how they can escape using Bonnie’s magic. Bonnie doesn’t want to let Kai back into their world because he will kill more of his family. But he threatens to steal all of her magic and kill her if she doesn’t bring him back as well. Damon just wants to get back.

Under pressure from Kai, Damon finally tells the story of why the day of the eclipse was so horrible for him. In flashbacks, we see that he had come back to visit Stefan, tried to live a less murderous life, but ended up killing all of the boarders in the Salvatore house, including Sarah’s mother, who was the pregnant girlfriend of Zach Salvatore, the human who owned the Salvatore family home at this time.

Back in the present, Matt (Zach Roerig) decides to probe Tripp (Colin Ferguson) to find out how much he knows about vampires. When Matt tells him that Jay (Matthew Barnes) told him before he died that he was tracking a vampire, Tripp decides to trust him and tells him all he knows while leading him to the place where he keeps Enzo (Michael Malarkey). He says that Enzo was the one who killed Jay but he wants to make him talk and reveal where his other vampire friends are before he kills him. Jeremy (Steven R. McQueen) returns to the Salvatore house and finds Sarah (Gabrielle Walsh) there. Sarah tells him that she knows about his vampire sister and she also shows him a picture she found in the house of her parents. Sarah asks for explanations and if he knows them. Jeremy recognizes Zach in the picture and tells her that her father is Zach Salvatore. Sarah explains that her mother was killed while she was pregnant and at first, they thought the baby was going to die too, but the doctor did an emergency C-section. She had to stay in an incubator for three months, but she survived. The hospital didn’t know who her father was. (Stefan had compelled Zach to forget all about his girlfriend and the baby, so he never stepped forward to claim her.)

== Feature music ==
In the episode "Black Hole Sun" the songs are:

- "Black Is the Color" by Lucette
- "St. Louis Who" by The Lexingtons
- "Harlem" by Cathedrals
- "Fell on Black Days" by Soundgarden
- "Wild Ones" by Jessarae
- "Figure It Out" by Royal Blood
- "The Power of Love" by Gabrielle Aplin

== Cultural references ==
The title of the episode refers to a sun during an eclipse, which is part of what Bonnie and Damon need to get back home, but is also a reference to the same title song of the American rock band Soundgarden commonly associated with grief over Nirvana singer Kurt Cobain’s death. Greg Prato of Allmusic called the song "one of the few bright spots" of the summer of 1994 when "the world was still reeling from Nirvana leader Kurt Cobain's suicide the previous April". He said, "The song had a psychedelic edge to it (especially evident in the verse's guitar part), as the composition shifted between sedate melodicism and gargantuan guitar riffs. The lyrics were classic Chris Cornell—lines didn't exactly make sense on paper but did within the song." In the episode, during his flashback scene with Stefan, Damon held up the front-page news saying "Kurt Cobain found dead".

== Reception ==
=== Ratings ===
In its original American broadcast, "Black Hole Sun" was watched by 1.66 million; down by 0.17 from the previous episode.

=== Reviews ===
"Black Hole Sun" received positive reviews.

Stephanie Flasher from TV After Dark gave the episode a B+ rating saying that the episode "had viewers on the edge of their seats with anticipation to find out what comes next. The episode had several unexpected reveals and three cliffhangers bringing back for the next episode."

Rebecca Jane Stokes of Den of Geek rated the episode with 5/5 saying that the show brings it on with the new vampires and serial killers added to it.

Leigh Raines from TV Fanatic rated the episode with 4.5/5 saying that the first three episodes left us with tons of questions and in this episode the writers deliver many answers.

Ashley Dominique of Geeked Out Nation rated the episode with 8.5/10 saying that "all the story lines started to come together in "Black Hole Sun" for a truly satisfying episode. Add in all the new tidbits of information this episode threw at us, that wasn't much to dislike."

Stephanie Hall from K Site TV gave a good review to the episode saying that "[the episode] was better and more impressive than last week's episode, more comparable to the first two of this season in both quality and its ability to generate excitement. Although there were numerous storylines at work this week, the episode did not feel fragmented or jumpy [...] the solid writing allowed the uniting themes of the storylines to be more apparent here than in other episodes."

Caroline Preece of Den of Geek gave a good review to the episode saying that the season continues to thrill with its refreshed, revived feel. "The 90s twist is the best thing about a season with lots of great things, and we got to immerse ourselves in it even more during Black Hole Sun."

Jen from TV Overmind gave a good review to the episode saying that this season is on fire. "The rapid pacing of the storylines definitely helps to keep the suspense fresh, much like the early seasons. [...] Overall the Bonnie and Damon storyline is my favorite to watch. The mystery of figuring out where they are and why they were sent there is great, but their friendship is fun to see develop. They always borderline hated each other but played nice for Elena's sake and now they're actually finding that they care about each other."
