= Fade into You (The Vampire Diaries) =

- The Vampire Diaries episode
- Episode no.: Season 6 Episode 8
- Directed by: Joshua Butler
- Written by: Nina Fiore; John Herrera
- Production code: 2J7858
- Original air date: November 20, 2014

Guest appearances
- Penelope Mitchell (Liv Parker); Chris Brochu (Luke Parker); Jodi Lyn O'Keefe (Jo Laughlin-Parker); Marco James (Liam Davis); Chris Wood (Kai Parker); Christopher Cousins (Joshua Parker)

Episode chronology
← Previous "Do You Remember the First Time?"	Next → "I Alone"
- The Vampire Diaries season 6

"Fade into You" is the 8th episode of the sixth season of the American series The Vampire Diaries and the series' 119th episode overall. "Fade Into You" was originally aired on November 20, 2014, on The CW. The episode was written by Nina Fiore and John Herrera and directed by Joshua Butler.

== Plot ==
Caroline (Candice Accola) organizes a "friendsgiving dinner" for the Thanksgiving Day and she invites everyone except Stefan (Paul Wesley). Jo (Jodi Lyn O'Keefe) is the first to arrive and when Elena (Nina Dobrev) asks her where Alaric (Matt Davis) is, Jo tells them that Alaric had to make an unplanned trip with Damon (Ian Somerhalder) and Stefan. Elena calls Alaric only to find out that Bonnie (Kat Graham) is probably alive and they had to make this trip to find a way to save her.

Liam (Marco James) arrives at the "friendsgiving dinner" and apologizes to Elena. Liv (Penelope Mitchell) also arrives but she does not seem to be in a very good mood and Tyler (Michael Trevino) tries to understand what is wrong. Luke (Chris Brochu) gets to the dinner last bringing a video of him and Liv from their fourth birthday for everyone to see. He plays it and when Jo hears it, she recognizes her voice and reveals that she is Liv and Lukas' sister.

Jo tells everyone the story of her family and what her brother Kai (Chris Wood) did eighteen years ago. The leaders of their coven, the Gemini coven, come from twins. Her and Kai should be the ones to follow the leadership but Kai was born without his own magic and he had to consume it from others. When their father realized that Kai would not be the best person to lead the coven, they kept having kids until another set of twins was born. When Kai found out, he killed his four other siblings and was after Liv and Lucas too. Jo protected them with her magic and agreed to merge with him for the leadership to save their lives. Jo, though, hid her magic and Kai was not able to merge with her. Their father, with the help of Sheila Bennett, used the power of the eclipse to send him away in his prison of 1994. When Elena asks why Liv is so upset about being the leader of the coven, Jo and Luke clarify that after the merge, the weaker of the twins dies.

In the meantime, Damon, Stefan and Alaric get to Portland to investigate about the Gemini coven. They find the house but no one seems to be there. Alaric finds pictures of Jo inside the house and in one of the pictures, Damon recognizes Kai. A man appears who introduces himself as the father of Kai, Joshua Parker (Christopher Cousins), and when he shakes hands with Damon, he makes them and the house disappear so Alaric and Stefan cannot see them. He uses his powers on Damon to knock him out and takes him into the house. When Damon wakes up, Joshua wants to know how Damon met Kai and if Kai can get himself out of his prison. Damon tells him everything and that they need the ascendant to get Bonnie out of there, but Joshua does not want to give it to him.

Joshua realizes that since Kai has the ascendant and while being trapped with a Bennett witch, he will finally find his way out. To make sure that he will not merge with Jo, he casts a spell to kill her. Meanwhile, outside the house, Alaric is on the phone with Jo. She informs him that the ascendant is with her and that her father will not allow them to open Kai's world. While they are talking, Jo collapses due to her father's spell. Elena and Liam try to help her while she gives Stefan and Alaric directions how to get into the house. Stefan gets into the house in time to save Damon and Elena is forced to heal Jo by using her blood in front of Liam. Liam is confused and asks for explanations, Elena tells him the truth but she immediately compels him to forget everything about it.

In 1994, Kai brings Bonnie to Portland and offers to cook Thanksgiving dinner to her. They make a deal that after that, everyone will take their separate ways. During the dinner Kai tells Bonnie the whole story about his family and how they locked him up there. He also reveals to her that all this time he was wondering where his sister's magic went when they tried to merge but he figured it out when Bonnie put her magic away for safety. He finds the knife where Jo put her magic and he consumes it. Bonnie reminds him that since she does not have her magic, he cannot do the spell since he needs a Bennett witch. Kai tells her that after seeing the spell twice, he knows that he only needs Bennett's blood so he stabs her with the knife. Later on, Bonnie wakes up to realize that Kai left to go back to Mystic Falls leaving her alone in Portland.

== Feature music ==
In the episode "Fade Into You" we can hear the songs:

- "When You Fall In Love" by Andrew Ripp
- "Runaway Train" by Soul Asylum
- "Mr. Jones" by Counting Crows
- "Full Moon Song" by Peter Bradley Adams
- "When I Get Older" by Wild Party

== Reception ==
=== Ratings ===
In its original American broadcast, "Fade Into You" was watched by 1.68 million; up by 0.14 from the previous episode.

=== Reviews ===
"Fade Into You" received mixed reviews.

Stephanie Flasher from TV After Dark gave the episode a B rating saying that it was a rather satisfying one. "It brings some truths to light while leaving viewers intrigued so they're sure tune in for the next episode." Flasher praised the writers, Nina Fiore and John Herrera, of the episode saying that they managed to say "four separate stories, in different locations and different decades altogether into one eye opening, question answering episode" as well as the director Joshua Butler, for whom she stated that he did a great job.

Rebecca Serle of Vulture rated the episode with 5/5 saying that it was probably the darkest episode we've seen this show go but also straight-up delightful. "Just when you think you have The Vampire Diaries figured out, it goes in a direction so unforeseen, you find yourself checking your TV Guide to make sure you’re on the right channel."

Leigh Raines from TV Fanatic rated the episode with 4.5/5. "For the most part, it was all about the magic this week, something I've kind of noticed lately in the world of Julie Plec. This is not a complaint by any means; I find this whole storyline fascinating. It's just that from watching both The Vampire Diaries and The Originals, it feels like the witches have suddenly taken a much more central role."

Sara Ditta of Next Projection rated the episode with 6.4/10 saying that it was a plot-heavy episode with many reveals about characters the viewers are not invested in, but there were some solid moments on it. "Overall, it was an episode designed to reveal a lot of plot behind a storyline that we aren’t particularly invested in since there aren’t many direct connections to our main characters. While Alaric is dating Jo now and Bonnie is stuck with Kai, the narrative is mainly focused on drama within this family of witches."

Rebecca Jane Stokes from Den of Geek rated the episode with 3/5 saying that it had many cliches. "I was really, really into the whole Jo and Kai being twins deal, though it was hardly revelatory if you’ve been paying attention and have read a book. The Gemini coven? Clearly there were going to be twins involved. Not sure how I feel about this whole twins-fusing together, strong one absorbing the weak one’s strength, but I’ll go for it for now."

Jen of TV Overmind gave a good review to the episode saying that everything makes more sense now and the balance between the cheesy romances and the darker aspects has never been so right since the early seasons. "While it’s predictable that the new witches this season are all related, they have such a twisted family history that it could rival that of the Mikaelsons. Ever since we lost the Original family to their spin-off show, it’s a welcome change to introduce an equally troubled serial killer and his family’s complicated past."
