= I Alone (The Vampire Diaries) =

- The Vampire Diaries episode
- Episode no.: Season 6 Episode 9
- Directed by: Kellie Cyrus
- Written by: Brian Young; Holly Brix
- Production code: 2J7859
- Original air date: December 4, 2014

Guest appearances
- Penelope Mitchell (Liv Parker); Jodi Lyn O'Keefe (Jo Laughlin-Parker); Gabrielle Walsh (Monique); Chris Wood (Kai Parker)

Episode chronology
← Previous "Fade Into You"	Next → "Christmas Through Your Eyes (The Vampire Diaries)"
- The Vampire Diaries season 6

"I Alone" is the 9th episode of the sixth season of the American series The Vampire Diaries and the series' 120th episode overall. "I Alone" was originally aired on December 4, 2014, on The CW. The episode was written by Brian Young & Holly Brix and directed by Kellie Cyrus.

In the episode, Liv sends Damon and Elena back to 1994 to save Bonnie but Kai's return to Mystic Falls ruins their plans since Liv is forced to bring them back to present before they get Bonnie. Stefan meets the girl who appears as his relative Sarah, but since Stefan knows the real Sarah, he knows that she is lying. He makes her tell him the truth and then compels her to forget everything about Sarah and Mystic Falls. Enzo who suspects that Stefan is hiding something, he kills the girl. In the meantime, Kai firstly attacks Liv but later he meets Tyler telling him that he wants to save Liv's life and he is asking for his help.

The episode received mixed reviews from the critics.

== Plot ==
After Damon (Ian Somerhalder) compels Alaric (Matt Davis) to do whatever he has to do to get the ascendant from Jo (Jodi Lyn O'Keefe), Alaric has no choice. After obtaining it, Damon compels him again to forget everything and along with Elena (Nina Dobrev) they meet Liv (Penelope Mitchell), who sends them back to 1994 to find Bonnie (Kat Graham) and bring her home. While searching for Bonnie, Elena wonders why Jo agreed to give Damon the ascendant which is the only thing that is protecting her from Kai (Chris Wood), but Damon manages to avoid the truth.

Damon and Elena page Bonnie and are able to speak to her and tell her that they are bringing her home. In their conversation Bonnie tells them that Kai stabbed her to get her blood leaving her in Portland, and that she fear Kai might be free. While waiting for Bonnie to get back in Mystic Falls, Damon tells Elena the truth of how he got the ascendant, something that makes her furious, accusing him that he would do anything to make her fall in love with him again, no matter who gets hurt. Damon confesses to her that Bonnie kept him alive while the two of them were stuck in 1994 and she was the one giving him hope, explaining that this is the reason he wants to save Bonnie, not only to make her fall in love with him again.

Back in present time, Kai kills a cab driver and once he arrives in Mystic Falls finds Liv. He steals some of her magic and tries to kill her but Tyler (Michael Trevino) comes in time and saves her. Seeing that Kai is free, Tyler wants to take Liv inside the borders of Mystic Falls where no magic works to protect her from Kai. That forces Liv to bring Damon and Elena back to the present before Bonnie gets to them and she is left behind again. They try to convince her to send them back but Liv leaves with Tyler. A little bit later, Kai finds Elena and Damon at the cemetery and destroys the ascendant while he crosses the border and gets to Mystic Falls, with Elena and Damon not be able to do anything to stop him.

Jo finds out that the ascendant is gone and confronts Alaric, being the only other person who knew where she kept it, but Alaric swears he did not take it. Jo tells him that it might be possible that he took it but he does not remember because he was compelled to forget. Alaric tells her that Damon is his friend and would never do that to him, so Jo makes him to cross the border so they can see if Alaric is compelled.

Meanwhile, Stefan (Paul Wesley) meets Matt's (Zach Roerig) friend who claims to be Sarah (Gabrielle Walsh), the daughter of their uncle. Later, it is revealed that she is actually an impostor who goes by the name of Monique. Stefan knew about the real Sarah and where she was all these years, since he has been watching over her whole life, so the moment he saw Monique, he knew she was lying. He compels Monique to forget she ever knew Sarah and to leave Mystic Falls, because he does not want Damon, or anyone else, to know about Sarah. Enzo (Michael Malarkey) suspects that Stefan hides something and kills Monique because Stefan refuses to tell him. That makes Matt go to Jeremy (Steven R. McQueen) and ask him to help him kill Enzo.

At the end of the episode, Alaric, now knowing the truth about Damon compelling him, confronts him and even though Damon tries to apologize he hits him and leaves when he finds out Kai is already free. In the meantime, Bonnie returns to Mystic Falls of 1994 but she does not find Elena and Damon there and starts crying. In present day, Kai gets to Tyler's home and tells him that he wants to save Liv's life, asking for his help.

== Feature music ==
In the episode "I Alone" we can hear the songs:

- "Lost" by Kris Allen
- "Compass" by Zella Day
- "The Woods" by Israel Cannan
- "Stepping Stone" by Fly Golden Eagle
- "Hey Jealousy" by Gin Blossoms
- "Dirty White Boots" by Lenny Kravitz
- "Trick Of The Light" by Lonely the Brave
- "Mother & Father" by Broods

== Reception ==
=== Ratings ===
In its original American broadcast, "I Alone" was watched by 1.49 million; down by 0.19 from the previous episode.

=== Reviews ===
"I Alone" received mixed reviews.

Stephanie Flasher from TV After Dark gave the episode a B+ rating saying that the episode had a little bit of something for everyone and the writers Brian Young and Holly Brix took viewers on an emotional journey filled with ups and downs.

Ashley Dominique of Geeked Out Nation rated the episode with 7.1/10 stating that the episode moved the plot with the Gemini Coven forward, readjusting the tensions within our characters.

Jen from TV Overmind rated the episode with 7/10 saying that the episode left her feeling a little uneasy about the second half of the season and the next week's midseason finale.

Leigh Raines of TV Fanatic rated the episode with 3.5/5 stating that the episode was a full hour of good intentions but with poor planning.

Sara Ditta from Next Projection rated the episode with 5.7/10 saying that the only characters with any real spark in the episode were Enzo and Kai. "While neither the plot nor characters developed significantly in this episode, the show's baddies brought some fun moments in an episode that mostly sets up next week's midseason finale."

Caroline Preece of Den of Geek gave a good review to the episode saying that the show delivered yet another fantastic hour of television. "There are shows, like The Vampire Diaries, that start off pretty terribly before going on to become sizeable hits. They burn hot and bright for a couple of seasons before the complacency sets in and eventually drives even the most enthusiastic fans away. Vampire Diaries was a textbook example of this, and to see it get back to its early quality in its sixth year is fantastic."
