= Do You Remember the First Time? (The Vampire Diaries) =

- The Vampire Diaries episode
- Episode no.: Season 6 Episode 7
- Directed by: Darren Genet
- Written by: Rebecca Sonnenshine
- Production code: 2J7857
- Original air date: November 13, 2014

Guest appearances
- Colin Ferguson (Tripp Fell); Penelope Mitchell (Liv Parker); Marguerite MacIntyre (Liz Forbes); Chris Brochu (Luke Parker); Jodi Lyn O'Keefe (Jo Laughlin-Parker); Marco James (Liam Davis); Chris Wood (Kai Parker); Brody Wellmaker (tiktoker/actor)

Episode chronology
← Previous "The More You Ignore Me, the Closer I Get"	Next → "Fade Into You"
- The Vampire Diaries season 6

"Do You Remember the First Time?" is the 7th episode of the sixth season of the American series The Vampire Diaries and the series' 118th episode overall. "Do You Remember the First Time?" was originally aired on November 13, 2014, on The CW. The episode was written by Rebecca Sonnenshine and directed by Darren Genet.

== Feature music ==
In the episode "Do You Remember the First Time?" we can hear the songs:

- "Another Love" by Tom Odell
- "The Hardest Part" by Nina Nesbitt
- "MSK" by Yellowcard
- "Belong" by Cary Brothers
- "Two Weeks" by Grizzly Bear
- ”Budapest” by George Ezra
- "Concrete Angel (Acoustic)" by Christina Novelli

== Reception ==
=== Ratings ===
In its original American broadcast, "Do You Remember the First Time?" was watched by 1.54 million; slightly down by 0.05 from the previous episode.

=== Reviews ===
"Do You Remember the First Time?" received positive reviews.

Stephanie Flasher from TV After Dark gave a B+ rating to the episode saying that it was a nice one, especially for the fans of Damon and Elena. "Bittersweet trip down the couple's history and an epic rain kiss. Finally, Caroline and Stefan have the feelings conversation and Alaric gets his groove back now that he's a human again. And the music was good."

Rebecca Jane Stokes of Den of Geek rated the episode with 4/5 saying that it was a sweet episode and that Stefan finally found out about Caroline's feelings. "The show did what it does best this week. It married romance and longing with the deliberate if piecemeal doling out of key plot points."

Ashley Dominique from Geeked Out Nation rated the episode with 7.9/10 saying that the episode "forced Damon and Elena to explore the new status of their relationship in another slow drawn out episode. However, it was made interesting by not relying on flashbacks, but let them be in the moment."

Sara Ditta of Next Projection rated the episode with 7.2/10 saying that the episode "satisfied because of its tempered tone. The drama wasn’t taken overboard, and viewers could relate to each of our main characters who tried to grasp on to friendships and relationships that had already fallen apart."

Leigh Raines from TV Fanatic rated the episode with 3.5. "All in all, a decent episode, with minor developments but not enough."

Caroline Preece of Den of Geek gave a good review to the episode saying that the show has improved greatly since it stopped paying attention only to Damon and Elena's relationship. "The Damon/Elena storyline is still a frustrating mess, but it’s also not the only thing on the show anymore – and that gives viewers no longer interested in Elena’s love life a reason to come back. Just that simple thing is what fans have been asking for and, now that we have it, it’s glorious."
