= I'll Remember (The Vampire Diaries) =

- The Vampire Diaries episode
- Episode no.: Season 6 Episode 1
- Directed by: Jeffrey Hunt
- Written by: Caroline Dries
- Production code: 2J7851
- Original air date: October 2, 2014

Guest appearances
- Colin Ferguson (Tripp Fell); Penelope Mitchell (Liv Parker); Marguerite MacIntyre (Elizabeth Forbes); Chris Brochu (Luke Parker); Jodi Lyn O'Keefe (Jo Laughlin-Parker); Emily C. Chang (Ivy); Gabrielle Walsh (Monique); Marco James (Liam Davis)

Episode chronology
← Previous "Home"	Next → "Yellow Ledbetter"
- The Vampire Diaries season 6

"I'll Remember" is the 1st episode of the sixth season of the American series The Vampire Diaries and the series' 112th episode overall. "I'll Remember" was originally aired on October 2, 2014, on The CW. The episode was written by Caroline Dries and directed by Jeffrey Hunt.

== Plot ==
The episode starts with a couple camping outside the Mystic Falls when on their way to the car, they are attacked by a vampire.

Everyone tries to continue their lives after Damon (Ian Somerhalder) and Bonnie’s (Kat Graham) death. Elena (Nina Dobrev), Tyler (Michael Trevino), Liv (Penelope Mitchell) and Luke (Chris Brochu) are back to college where Alaric (Matt Davis) is now a professor and Matt (Zach Roerig) has joined the Community Protection Squad in Mystic Falls.

Caroline (Candice Accola) tries to find a way to break the spell that keeps them away from Mystic Falls while she believes Stefan (Paul Wesley) tries to find a way to bring Damon and Bonnie back when in reality he lives in Savannah where he works as a mechanic and he is in a relationship with a girl named Ivy (Emily C. Chang) ignoring Caroline's phone calls and voice mails. When Elena calls him to ask him how the research for bringing Damon and Bonnie back is going, Stefan tells her that he gave up because there is no way to do it, he said his goodbye and moves on with his life.

Sheriff Forbes (Marguerite MacIntyre) gets a phone call about two people submitted to the hospital with marks on their necks and tries to find the vampire who attacked them. It is later revealed that the vampire who attacked them was Elena as a result of the herbs Luke has been giving her so she can see Damon and talk to him. She tells Luke that the herbs make her thirsty and he attempts to stop supplying her with them but without any luck.

On her way to meet Caroline, Elena runs into Sarah (Gabrielle Walsh) whose car broke down just outside Mystic Falls. Elena stops to help her and she ends up attacking her. Caroline gets there and realizes that the vampire her mother is looking for is Elena. Sarah manages to escape and she runs into the protective area where Elena and Caroline cannot enter. Elena explains to Caroline why she is feeding on people again and about the herbs Luke has been giving her so she can see Damon.

Sarah gets in Mystic Falls asking for help and Matt sees her and gets to her first. She tells him about a girl attacking her and when Tripp (Colin Ferguson) gets there Matt covers the story till Liz also gets there to tell him to get Sarah to the hospital. Later, Matt takes Sarah outside the protective area to meet Caroline, so she can compel Sarah to forget about the attack.

Tyler tries to control his anger issues so he will not kill someone and triggers his werewolf curse again. Alaric warns him to be very careful and even though Tyler says he has it under control, when Caroline tells him about Luke giving Elena herbs that make her see Damon, he attacks Luke and almost kills him. Alaric breaks them up and demands to know why Tyler attacked Luke. Liv meets Tyler to ask him to leave her brother alone, Tyler apologizes and tells her that he is also trying to deal with the new reality.

Elena, after the phone call she had with Stefan, makes a final attempt to say goodbye to Damon but she cannot do it. Not knowing what else she can do to deal with Damon’s death, she goes to Alaric who since he was created with the Original spell he is an Original vampire, and asks him to compel her forget that she ever loved Damon.

The episode ends with Damon and Bonnie having breakfast but it is unknown where they are.

== Feature music ==
In the episode "I'll Remember" we can hear the songs:

- "Hunger of the Pine" by alt-J
- "Shine" by Collective Soul
- "Light a Fire" by Rachel Taylor
- "Young Chasers" by Circa Waves
- "From the Wreckage Build a Home" by The Wind and The Wave
- "Doses & Mimosas" by Cherub
- "Penny" by Maudlin Strangers
- "Just One of the Guys" by Jenny Lewis
- "Sorry" by Clooney

== Reception ==
=== Ratings ===
In its original American broadcast, "I'll Remember" was watched by 1.81 million; up by 0.20 from the previous episode.

=== Reviews ===
"I'll Remember" received mixed reviews.

Stephanie Flasher from TV After Dark gave the episode a B+ rating saying that overall it was a great episode to kick off the sixth season. ""I'll Remember" was a nice episode to refresh viewers on last season, while updating us on where everyone stands and how they're dealing or not dealing. There was just enough of a tease in each storyline to intrigue viewers about the new season."

Carrie Raisler of The A.V. Club gave the episode a C+ rating stating that these are not the types of episodes at which the show excels. "But the season six opener has one big thing going for it: That weird, wonderful final scene. After an episode full of grief and denial, initial confusion and then eventual recentering, seeing it end on a nonsensical scene where Damon and Bonnie appeared to be in full domestic bliss, making breakfast together and eating blueberry pancakes like it was the most normal thing in the world, was a welcome breath of fresh air."

Leigh Raines from TV Fanatic rated the episode with 4.5/5 saying that it is only the first episode of the season and there are already so many questions.

Ashley Dominique of Geeked Out Nation rated the episode with 7.6/10 saying that the episode felt like a complete reset. "[The episode] felt like the fresh start the series needed. Unfortunately, the episode also failed to indicate in danger for our characters other than a no magic Mystic Falls."

Rebecca Jane Stokes from Den of Geek rated the episode with 3/5 saying that the sixth season was the partial re-boot the series needed.

Stephanie Hall of K Site TV gave a good review to the episode. "Even while including supernatural elements, this episode returned The Vampire Diaries to its days of simple, human problems, such as struggling with emotions, desiring normality, and deciding to move on. Its lack of complexity did not reduce the quality, but rather, the opposite is true. It contained solid character-based drama that set up mostly intriguing storylines for the season."

Caroline Preece from Den of Geek gave a mixed review saying that it was not the most exciting episode of the show, but it was a premiere that set up a lot of things to come.
