= The More You Ignore Me, the Closer I Get (The Vampire Diaries) =

- The Vampire Diaries episode
- Episode no.: Season 6 Episode 6
- Directed by: Garreth Stover
- Written by: Chad Fiveash; James Stoterau
- Production code: 2J7856
- Original air date: November 6, 2014

Guest appearances
- Colin Ferguson (Tripp Fell); Jodi Lyn O'Keefe (Jo Laughlin-Parker); Emily C. Chang (Ivy); Gabrielle Walsh (Monique)

Episode chronology
← Previous "The World Has Turned and Left Me Here"	Next → "Do You Remember the First Time?"
- The Vampire Diaries season 6

"The More You Ignore Me, the Closer I Get" is the 6th episode of the sixth season of the American series The Vampire Diaries and the series' 117th episode overall. "The More You Ignore Me, the Closer I Get" was originally aired on November 6, 2014, on The CW. The episode was written by Chad Fiveash and James Stoterau and directed by Garreth Stover.

== Plot ==
Tripp (Colin Ferguson) crosses the Mystic Falls border with yet another group of vampires (causing them to die because of the anti-magic spell placed over Mystic Falls), including Ivy (Emily C. Chang). Damon (Ian Somerhalder), having recently returned from Kai's magical purgatory, informs Stefan (Paul Wesley) of the nature of his whereabouts and return. Damon makes Stefan promise to hide from the others that Bonnie (Kat Graham) was trapped with him, where she sacrificed herself in order to bring him back to life. Stefan informs Caroline (Candice Accola) of Damon's secret, and Caroline tells Elena (Nina Dobrev).

Damon also is informed by Stefan that Elena, the love of his life, has compelled away all of her positive memories of him after accepting his loss. Damon attempts to meet with Elena, but Elena refuses and attempts to avoid Damon altogether. Alaric (Matt Davis), who originally altered Elena's memories of Damon with his powers of compulsion, tries to convince Elena to be recompelled to remember her feelings for Damon now that he has returned, but Elena refuses. Elena makes Alaric promise not to compel back her memory until she asks him to. Alaric accepts her terms and asks her a favor: to find out why Jo (Jodi Lyn O'Keefe) cannot be compelled (after attempting to compel their date from her memory the night before).

Matt (Zach Roerig) informs Caroline and Alaric about Enzo (Michael Malarkey) being captured and held hostage by Tripp who is using him in order to get information about the other vampires that used to inhabit Mystic Falls. They begin to question how Tripp was able to incarcerate Enzo before Stefan confesses that he turned Enzo in while he was in a vengeful state. Caroline and Stefan attempt to save Enzo, only to find that the warehouse in which Matt informed them Enzo was being held had been abandoned.

Sarah (Gabrielle Walsh) goes to Tripp's office in search of information regarding her familial history, only to find that Matt is also in the office. She enlists his help in her search after telling him her most recent discovery: Zach Salvatore was her biological father. While they are searching the files in Tripp's office, they receive a call from Caroline. They learn that Caroline's attempt at finding Enzo failed. In the midst of their snooping, Sarah and Matt find Ivy's phone in the drawer of Tripp's desk. Since Caroline's name is in her phone as the most recently dialed number, they come to the conclusion that Tripp and his followers are aware of her vampirism. Matt and Sarah return to the Salvatore house, where Matt tells her about Damon and Stefan and their vampirism, but he advises her not to dig deeper into her history because she will not find the family that she is looking for in Mystic Falls.

At the hospital, Elena stalks Jo in a desperate attempt to discover her secret. Jo, after Liam (Marco James) tells her about Lady Whitmore and her miraculous recovery at the corn maze the night before, discovers Elena and Alaric's true identity. She warns Elena about the missing blood from the hospital, but Elena continues her interrogation only to discover that Jo is a witch. Jo ends the conversation immediately, promising not to ask questions about Elena if Elena agrees to do the same.

Meanwhile, Damon goes to Elena's dorm room in a reminiscent mood. Jeremy meets him there, asking him about Bonnie and her whereabouts. Damon continues his lie, telling him that she was not with him and that she had found peace. While Damon is still in Elena's dorm, Elena calls him. She invites him to meet with her face to face, but before they are able to meet at the dorm, Damon is kidnapped by Tripp. Elena calls Alaric, informing him of Damon's capture. Alaric immediately leaves to rescue him when he is caught off guard by Jo. Jo states that Alaric and her need to have a conversation. Alaric asks Jo to stay away from him for her own safety after telling her the truth about his species and the mission ahead of him. Tripp drives to Mystic Falls, where he plans to kill Damon and Enzo by crossing the magical border. Alaric and Stefan await Tripp's arrival at the first entry to Mystic Falls, while Elena and Caroline close off the second one. Elena confesses to Caroline that if they are able to rescue Damon from Tripp's hold, she will have Alaric restore her memories of her love for Damon.

Tripp plans to enter Mystic Falls on the road that Stefan and Alaric are blocking. Alaric attempts to stop him from driving across the border by removing him from the vehicle, but Tripp continues to drive, dragging Alaric through with him. Damon and Enzo are stuck in the trunk of Tripp's vehicle, so Stefan decides to cross the border in one final attempt to save his brother. The three of them manage to cross back over the border, but Alaric is unable to follow them as the mortal wound that Esther Mikaelson gave him returns. Jo arrives and provides medical care to Alaric, ignoring his pleas to take him back across the border. Esther's spell is stripped away, rendering Alaric human once again, but thanks to Jo, Alaric survives.

The episode ends as Stefan attempts to apologize to Caroline, but he is rejected and informed that they are no longer friends; Elena is finally reunited with Damon.

== Featured music ==
In the episode "The More You Ignore Me, the Closer I Get" we hear the songs:

- "Unbreakable" by Jamie Scott
- "Last Night Of Summer" by The Garden District
- "Last Summer" by David Gray
- "I Don't Wanna Be In Love" by Dark Waves
- "Lucille" by John the Conqueror
- "Why Don't You Love Me (Like You Used To Do?)" by Hank Williams III

== Reception ==
=== Ratings ===
In its original American broadcast, "The More You Ignore Me, the Closer I Get" was watched by 1.59 million; slightly up by 0.01 from the previous episode.

=== Reviews ===
"The More You Ignore Me, the Closer I Get" received mixed reviews.

Stephanie Flasher from TV After Dark gave the episode a B− rating saying: "Despite the writers disregard of following the series mythology, "The More You Ignore Me, the Closer I Get" was a solid, but somewhat predictable episode with yet again another obstacle for Elena and Damon to overcome."

Leigh Raines of TV Fanatic rated the episode with 4/5 saying that the potential reunion of Damon and Elena was a bit intense: "The way they spoke through the door, mirroring hand movements, Elena's trembling as she reached for the knob, a truly emotional Damon...the writers were looking to tug at viewers' heartstrings."

Rebecca Jane Stokes from Den of Geek rated the episode with 2/5 saying that the writers tried to breathe life back to something that was never dead, referring to Damon and Elena's relationship. "Damon and Elena together are their own living, breathing, walking, talking (sort of) conflict. You never had to worry about getting bored with them as a couple because they are so fundamentally different as characters. Elena's decision to try to avoid Damon and keep Alaric from helping her remember him is a weak ploy to try to make something already interesting even MORE interesting."

Jen of TV Overmind gave a good review to the episode saying that Jo was a surprise and "her actions have changed the course of the season in my mind."

Caroline Preece from Den of Geek gave a mixed review to the episode stating that the storyline between Elena and Damon has been done to death by now but the rest of the episode kept up with the generally elevated quality of season six. "Damon and Elena's love story had hit a dead end and now the writers are desperately trying to dig a new road for them to go down."
