= Home (The Vampire Diaries) =

- The Vampire Diaries episode
- Episode no.: Season 5 Episode 22
- Directed by: Chris Grismer
- Written by: Caroline Dries; Brian Young
- Production code: 2J7522
- Original air date: May 15, 2014

Guest appearances
- Marguerite MacIntyre (Elizabeth Forbes); Michael Malarkey (Enzo); Raffi Barsoumian (Markos); Penelope Mitchell (Liv Parker); Chris Brochu (Luke Parker); Jasmine Guy (Sheila Bennett); Arielle Kebbel (Lexi Branson); Matthew Davis (Alaric Saltzman)

Episode chronology
← Previous "Promised Land"	Next → "I'll Remember"
- The Vampire Diaries season 5

"Home" is the 22nd and last episode of the fifth season of the American series The Vampire Diaries and the series' 111th episode overall. "Home" was originally aired on May 15, 2014, on The CW. The episode was written by Caroline Dries and Brian Young and directed by Chris Grismer.

== Plot ==
Caroline (Candice Accola) cries over Stefan's (Paul Wesley) dead body at the Whitmore dorm, while Damon (Ian Somerhalder) and Elena (Nina Dobrev) arrive. Stefan watches them from the other side while he starts to be pulled from existence, as the other side continues to crumble. He tries to hold on and Lexi (Arielle Kebbel) appears, saving him.

Damon meets Bonnie (Kat Graham) and is furious when he learns that they lost the only traveler who could help them with the spell and tells her to find another way, because his brother is on the Other Side, along with other people they all care about, such as Alaric (Matthew Davis) and her grandmother, Sheila (Jasmine Guy). Enzo (Michael Malarkey) appears with a new plan, which requires a witch.

Liv (Penelope Mitchell) and Luke (Chris Brochu) try to get as far away as they can to save themselves. However, Elena appears in the middle of the road, forcing Luke to stop the car, while Caroline stands behind the car. They get out and Elena informs them that Stefan is dead and the spell has stopped, but that they need their help to bring him back. Liv says that it's better that one of the doppelgangers is dead so they can all live, and Elena explains that if they bring Stefan back, they will kill the travelers. Liv still does not want to help, so Caroline snaps Luke's neck, sending him to the other side. Liv, not having any other choice, agrees to help them. In the meantime, Enzo takes Bonnie to meet the traveler who will teach her the spell. It turns out to be Silas, but he will only help if they bring him back to life too.

Back in Mystic Falls, Liz (Marguerite MacIntyre) helps to evacuate the town while Markos (Raffi Barsoumian) is observing. He explains that he is not afraid of Damon or Stefan coming to save the town, simply because they cannot cross the line where the spell starts. To prove his point, he uses Julian (Tyler) (Michael Trevino) to show what will happen to any supernatural creature if they try to enter the town. They push Julian into the spell's limits and he first loses his werewolf nature, then the vampire one and returns to the last state he was as human, dead from the broken neck that Klaus caused. Tyler's spirit appears to Bonnie and passes through her to the Other Side, not before she tells him that they can bring him back.

Damon explains that for his plan to bring everybody's loved ones back, they will have to kill many travelers so they can pass through Bonnie and their friends can pass through her in the other direction, like Markos did. Liz will have to gather all the travelers at one place. Matt (Zach Roerig) and Jeremy (Steven R. McQueen) will cause a gas leak, head out of town and then get the place where the travelers are gathered to explode. At the same time, Liv will start the resurrection spell. Jeremy worries about what will happen to Bonnie when everything is in motion, but Bonnie reassures him that everything will be fine.

In the meantime, Stefan and Lexi go to the Grill and catch up on news. She points out to him about Caroline and how she feels about him, but Stefan insists they are friends. Liz and Markos walk into the Grill and hear them talking. Stefan realizes that Liz is trying to gather the travelers in one place and figures that his friends are planning something.

Damon tells Elena the last part of the plan where someone has to trigger the explosion and that it will be him. Elena tries to talk him out of it because it is a suicide mission, but Damon asks her to respect his choice and promises that he will be back with the others from the Other Side.

Jeremy and Matt navigate the caves under the city, trying to find the gas line. Liz successfully gathers the travelers at the Grill and tries to find a way to leave before Markos figures out that something is going on. Markos suspects something, so Liz stays for a drink to convince him nothing is happening. Matt and Jeremy find the gas line, break it to cause the leak and leave.

Bonnie waits for Grams so she can tell her to come back with the others. Grams appears to tell her that she does not want to go back because she found her peace knowing that she helped Bonnie to find hers and that she is not the only one to know how to sacrifice herself for others. The two of them say goodbye and Grams leaves for peace. As they wait, oblivion tries to suck in Enzo and Silas. Bonnie saves Enzo and pretends to help Silas before letting him get sucked into oblivion in revenge for Silas' murder of her father.

At 7 pm, Liv starts chanting the spell while her brother watches from the Other Side, encouraging her. Liz is still at the Grill with Markos, who does not let her go. Knowing that she has to leave so the plan can be completed, she pretends to smell gas and she leads Markos to the storage room to investigate. When he turns his back to her to check where the leak comes from, she hits him and messages Damon to start. Markos gets up and stops her before she leaves.

Damon is right outside the city limits where the spell starts when he receives Liz's text. He gets into the car to drive to the city, when Elena joins him and tells him that she will go with him. Damon tries to talk her out of it, but Elena has made her choice and asks him to respect it as she respected his. They take off and they manage to crash into the Grill while they are still vampires and the building explodes. Dozens of travelers approach Bonnie to pass through her to the other side, including Markos.

Elena and Damon find Bonnie, who tells them to pass through her to the Other Side, find their bodies and come back as fast as they can. Elena finds her body, in addition to Alaric, who warns her to rush back to Bonnie because her brother needs her, and he will find Damon. Damon tries to help a trapped Liz at The Grill, where Alaric finds him and helps. The others, Stefan, Tyler, Enzo and Lexi, start to gather next to Bonnie ready to get out of the Other Side.

Meanwhile, Liv keeps chanting and Luke notices that the spell is too much for her and is hurting her. He rushes to Bonnie where everyone is gathered and tells her that they have to do it now because Liv is in danger. Stefan says that not everyone is still there but Luke touches Bonnie and passes through. He runs to Liv and asks her to stop the spell but she says that she promised to help them, so she continues.

Enzo does not want to wait any longer, so he also touches Bonnie to come back to life, and Tyler follows him. He sees Caroline waiting and he hugs her but he notices he feels different. He cuts himself and he realizes that he is not healing, meaning that he is no longer a hybrid. Bonnie tries to convince Lexi and Stefan to pass before it is too late but they want to wait for Damon, Elena and Alaric. Elena arrives but she does not want to go without Damon so Bonnie touches her forcing her through. Bonnie cannot hold on for long and she falls, with Stefan catching her; and he passes through.

Bonnie tells Lexi to pass too, but she refuses, seeing that Bonnie gets weaker with every passing soul. She says that she prefers to wait so her best friend gets his brother back before she passes. Markos shows up and tries to pass through Bonnie but Lexi holds him back long enough for the oblivion to suck him away. Lexi realizes Bonnie is dying in the process and gave up her place for Damon so Stefan gets a chance to have his brother back, thus also lets herself find peace and leave before the oblivion gets her.

Damon and Alaric arrive and Alaric goes through first. Damon asks where Elena is and Bonnie assures him she is safe. At the same time, Luke cannot let his sister die and chants a spell making her stop. Damon tries to pass through Bonnie after the spell has stopped but it no longer works, leaving him trapped in the Other Side. Elena tries desperately to find Liv so she can start the spell again, but Bonnie tells her that it is too late and Elena collapses. Damon is watching and Bonnie leaves them alone to say their goodbyes.

Bonnie calls Jeremy to tell him that there was never a way for her to come back and to also say goodbye. Jeremy runs to find her while Alaric finds Elena crying over Damon and hugs her. They hear Jeremy screaming for Bonnie and they try to get to him. Stefan sits with Caroline and is devastated after losing both Lexi and Damon. He knows Lexi must be the reason Markos did not make it back and says that Damon is gone, now that he had everything and was happy. Caroline stays with him to comfort him.

The episode ends with Bonnie and Damon holding hands waiting for the oblivion to suck them in.

== Feature music ==
In the episode "Home" we can hear the songs:

- "Wings" by Birdy
- "Be Alright" by Lucy Rose
- "Finished Sympathy" by Glasvegas
- "Buried Alive" by Yeah Yeah Yeahs
- "Love Is Just A Way To Die" by I Am Strikes
- "Walking" by Ash Grunwald
- "No Rest for the Wicked" by Lykke Li

== Reception ==
=== Ratings ===
In its original American broadcast, "Home" was watched by 1.61 million; up by 0.11 from the previous episode.

=== Reviews ===
"Home" received positive reviews.

Carrie Raisler from The A.V. Club gave the episode an A− rating comparing the death of Stefan in the previous episode to Damon's in this one: "The strange thing about the difference between the two is that although Stefan’s death was obviously impermanent, emotionally at the time it felt a lot more final than Damon (and potentially Bonnie’s) deaths here. [...] the way that Stefan died — so suddenly, so forcefully, so without one last goodbye — felt oddly more final than the little death tour Damon gets to do here."

Rebecca Serle of Vulture rated the episode with 5/5 saying that the season finales of The Vampire Diaries never disappoint. "The season finales of this show never disappoint. They are always intense, irrevocable, and devastating. But there is also something so unifying about them. I know we throw a lot of shade at this show. It’s ridiculous sometimes, and we like to laugh. But the community The Vampire Diaries has created is extraordinary."

Josie Kafka from Doux Reviews rated the episode with 4/4 saying that the fictional streaming TV Show Oh? Wow! Thing! from M.T. Anderson’s dystopian YA novel Feed sums up her reaction to the finale. "But it’s not just about how this episode ended. Getting there was more than half the fun. There were many excellent conversations, especially Damon’s speech to Elena that she couldn’t hear. Damon risking a half-sacrifice was impressive, but I was most touched by his willingness to stick around to help Sheriff Forbes, who has always been a friend to him."

Matt Richenthal of TV Fanatic rated the episode with 4.6/5 focusing his review on Damon's death. "A truly shocking and emotional hour of television, The Vampire Diaries Season 5 concluded with an absolute stunner. A heartbreaking loss. A goodbye for which viewers were not prepared." Richenthal states that he is not "buying" Damon's death but he writes: "Killing off Damon may be exactly what The Vampire Diaries needs. It certainly has fans talking now. It will have them tuning in this fall. It's silly to get angry at a show for axing a character you liked; that person is fictional, he or she is there to serve a story and it may be in the best interests of that story for the person to die. But it is not silly to get angry at a show for playing with your emotions. For constantly faking you out when it comes to death, something TVD has been guilty over for awhile now. Death has to mean something."

Ashley Dominique from Geeked Out Nation gave the episode a B+ rating. "The season finale of The Vampire Diaries introduced conflicts that were too quickly resolved, but delivered on the emotional aspects as they dealt with the dissolution of the other side in "Home"."

Stephanie Hall of K Site TV gave a good review to the episode saying that the season was "enjoyable, highly unpredictable, mind-blowing, heartfelt and heart wrenching". For the episode specifically, Hall stated: "Starting no less intense than last week’s episode ended, "Home" was a gripping hour of television, fittingly capping off the season, while still ensuring that we’d have plenty to ponder over the summer hiatus. [...] The episode itself, along with what it set up, made me more excited about the series’ potential than any other episode this season has. Part of what makes this episode shine is that after being one step behind the big bads all season, "Home" turned the tables and put the protagonists on the offense."

Thedude35 from Bitch Stole My Remote gave a good review to the episode saying that the season ended with a bang. "One thing I cannot deny about The Vampire Diaires: boy do they know how to do a season finale cliffhanger." He also comments on the goodbye scene between Elena and Damon praising it: "Well that is quite the goodbye that Damon and Elena have. I’ll give her one thing – Elena is a master at crying. And Damon is a master at the moving, “profess my love even though she can’t hear me” type of speeches."

Jen from TV Over Mind also gave a good review saying: "Longtime fans are no strangers to jaw-dropping season finales on The Vampire Diaries but I think you can all agree that this one is the most memorable so far. The conflicting emotions alone are enough to torture us until it returns in the fall."
