= Yellow Ledbetter (The Vampire Diaries) =

- The Vampire Diaries episode
- Episode no.: Season 6 Episode 2
- Directed by: Pascal Verschooris
- Written by: Julie Plec
- Production code: 2J7852
- Original air date: October 9, 2014

Guest appearances
- Colin Ferguson (Tripp Fell); Emily C. Chang (Ivy); Gabrielle Walsh (Monique)

Episode chronology
| ← Previous "I'll Remember" | Next → "Welcome to Paradise" |
- The Vampire Diaries season 6

"Yellow Ledbetter" is the 2nd episode of the sixth season of the American series The Vampire Diaries and the series' 113th episode overall. "Yellow Ledbetter" was originally aired on October 9, 2014, on The CW. The episode was written by Julie Plec and directed by Pascal Verschooris.

== Plot ==
Damon (Ian Somerhalder) and Bonnie (Kat Graham) are back in Mystic Falls after the collapse of the Other Side. They wander around the streets, but find no one else there. At this point, they discover a newspaper and realize that they are back in 1994, the day a solar eclipse took place (May 10).

Elena (Nina Dobrev), after her decision to let Alaric (Matt Davis) erase Damon from her memory, puts away everything that reminds her of him. She tells everyone her plan and asks them not to tell her anything about her relationship with Damon after Alaric has compelled her. Alaric and Elena start going through her memories and Alaric erases one by one, ultimately searching for the moment where Elena knew she loved Damon.

In the meantime, Jeremy (Steven R. McQueen) is hanging out with Sarah (Gabrielle Walsh) at Matt's (Zach Roerig) house. Matt does not like this idea because Sarah was attacked by Elena, but Jeremy tells him that everything is fine because Caroline (Candice Accola) compelled Sarah to forget about the attack.

Damon and Bonnie are stuck in 1994 and they try to find a way to get back to present. Bonnie tells Damon that since magic brought them there, then magic can take them back. Because Bonnie cannot practice magic anymore, she has to try to get her powers back. Their second day, they discover that they are living the same day as the day before (May 10) and they have been living the same day over and over again for the last four months.

Alaric informs Caroline that Stefan (Paul Wesley) stopped looking for a way to bring back Damon and Bonnie. She finds out that Enzo (Michael Malarkey) wants to try to find a way to help Damon and Bonnie. She finds Enzo to see what he knows. The two of them head to Stefan's place and Stefan is surprised seeing them there. The two of them have dinner with Stefan and his girlfriend, Ivy (Emily C. Chang).

During the dinner, Caroline and Enzo discover that Stefan has lived there for over two months while everyone thought he was finding a way to save Damon and Bonnie. Enzo causes a scene in front of Ivy, forcing Caroline to compel her. While fighting, Stefan snaps Enzo's neck. At the time, Caroline was on the phone with Alaric, who was asking her to help figure out when exactly Elena fell in love with Damon. Caroline says that she did while she was still with Stefan, and realizes that Stefan heard her. Caroline apologizes, but while they talk she discovers that Stefan never heard any of her messages and she leaves. Enzo joins her in the car, but when he sees that she is crying, he goes back to the house and kills Ivy in front of Stefan. He promises Stefan that he will make his life a living hell, just like Damon promised him in the past.

Alaric tells Elena that she has not been honest and that is why they cannot find the moment she fell in love with Damon. Once she tells him that it was when she was still with Stefan, Alaric is able to erase the memory from her head, making her now believe that Damon was a monster.

Tripp (Colin Ferguson) tells Matt that Sarah stole the car she came to Mystic Falls in. Matt tries to tell Jeremy. Sarah tells them that she is in Mystic Falls to find her father, so Jeremy takes her to the Salvatore house where no one lives and they will not find her. Matt calls Tripp to inform him that Sarah is looking for her father and during their conversation, it is revealed that Tripp is from a founding family, the Fells. That makes Matt suspicious of Tripp knowing about the supernatural things going on there. When they hang up, it is also revealed that Tripp knows about vampires and that he is hunting them down, then bringing them to Mystic Falls to kill them.

The episode ends with Damon and Bonnie discovering that they are not alone like they had previously thought. It is shown that someone solved the crossword puzzle she was trying to solve for the last four months.

== Feature music ==
In the episode "Yellow Ledbetter" we can hear the songs:

- "Everybody Hurts" by R.E.M.
- "Little Miss Can't Be Wrong" by Spin Doctors
- "Whatta Man" by Salt-N-Pepa
- "All The Glitter's Gone" by Romans
- "Now You Know" by The TVC
- "I Got Something For You" by Tim Murdock
- "Hello Goodbye" by The Young Lions
- "All Through The Night" by Sleeping at Last
- "Salvation" by Gabrielle Aplin

== Reception ==
=== Ratings ===
In its original American broadcast, "Yellow Ledbetter" was watched by 1.67 million; down by 0.14 from the previous episode.

=== Reviews ===
"Yellow Ledbetter" received mixed reviews.

Stephanie Flasher from TV After Dark gave the episode a B rating saying that overall it was a nice follow up from the season premiere but the choice of the writer of the episode, Julie Plec, to remove Elena's memories was bold. "All and all this episode was a fairly good episode to follow up with the season six premiere. However, it seemed rather counter-productive to make Damon seen as a monster in Elena's mind, but definitely resets the show in a way."

Leigh Raines from TV Fanatic rated the episode with 4/5, same as Rebecca Serle of Vulture, while Rebecca Jane Stokes from Den of Geek rated it with 3/5 stating that after this episode, Damon and Bonnie need their own spin-off.

Ashley Dominique of Geeked Out Nation rated the episode with 6.9/10 saying that it was a downside for the audience to be dragged through Elena's experience of losing her memories for Damon and totally unnecessary. "Enzo's return to TVD isn't enough to make up for the borderline memory lane episode. Despite the interesting elements introduced, none of them was progressing at a speed to keep them entertaining."

Caroline Preece of Den of Geek gave a good review to the episode saying that the show remembers how to be great again. "Yellow Ledbetter was a fantastic episode of a show that has had very few fantastic episodes in the last couple of years [...] Last week’s premiere may have felt a little more like business as usual, but Yellow Ledbetter proved that something significant has changed over the summer, and season six could potentially take the show back to the heights of seasons one and two."

Stephanie Hall from K Site TV also gave a good review saying that the episode was impressive and praising the writing of Julie Plec, saying that it was "snarky and wonderful".
