= Chris Brochu =

American actor (born 1989)

- Born: Christopher M. Brochu; June 25, 1989 (age 37); Washington, D.C., U.S.
- Occupations: Actor, musician, singer-songwriter
- Years active: 2007–present
- Known for: The Vampire Diaries
- Relatives: Doug Brochu (brother)

External image
- Brochu in 2019.

Christopher M. Brochu (born June 25, 1989) is an American actor and singer-songwriter. He is best known for his role as Luke Parker in The Vampire Diaries (2014–2015).

== Early life ==
Brochu was born in Washington, D.C. to Nita and Michael Brochu. He has an younger brother, Doug Brochu, and a younger sister, actress Kaitlyn "Kate" Brochu.

== Career ==
He was in the films Soul Surfer, where he played "Timmy Hamilton", and in Lemonade Mouth, where he played the rude and popular lead singer of the band Mudslide Crush, "Ray Beech". He sang "And the Crowd Goes" and "Don't Ya Wish U Were Us?" along with his friend, Scott Picket (played by Nick Roux). He is also known for the role of the witch Luke Parker on the TV show The Vampire Diaries.

== Filmography ==
=== Film ===
Year	Title	Role	Notes
2007	Pose Down	Brian Deck (Teen)	Direct-to-video
2008	Solar Flare	Riley Cassano	
2011	Soul Surfer	Timmy Hamilton	
2014	Dawn Patrol	Ben	
2018	Baja	Todd Meyer	
2019	Peace	Asch	
2021	Zero Contact	Sam Hart	

=== Television ===
Year	Title	Role	Notes
2007	Unfabulous	Guy 1	Episode: "The Two Timer"
2007	Zoey 101	Preppy Guy No. 1	Episode: "Logan Gets Cut Off"
2009	The Mentalist	Young Jane	Episode: "Throwing Fire"
2011	Truth Be Told	Kenny Crane	TV movie
2011	Lemonade Mouth	Ray Beech	TV movie
2011	Melissa & Joey	Roman Maizes	Recurring role (season 1)
2012	Awake	Chris Chapman	Episode: "Ricky's Tacos"
2012	NCIS: Los Angeles	Navy Petty Officer S. Allen	Episode: "Free Ride"
2013	CSI: New York	Jason Riley	Episode: "Civilized Lies"
2014	High School Possession	Mase Adkins	TV movie
2014–2015	The Vampire Diaries	Lucas "Luke" Parker	Recurring role (seasons 5–6)
2016	Shameless	Dylan Wallace	2 episodes
2016	Notorious	Preston Mann	2 episodes
2017	Once Upon a Date	Anthony Dunbrook	TV movie
2019	The Magicians	Derek	Episode: "The Side Effect"
2019	Dynasty	Dale	Episode:"Miserably Ungrateful Men"
2020	The Rookie	Crispin Bowers	Episode: "Hand-Off"
2023	Station 19	Brenton	Episode: "Never Gonna Give You Up"
2024	The Big Cigar	Dennis Hopper	Miniseries; 3 episodes

== Discography ==
=== Featured singles ===
List of singles, with selected chart positions
Title	Year	Album
"We Burnin' Up" (Adam Hicks featuring Chris Brochu)	2011	—N/a

=== Other appearances ===
Song	Year	Album
"And the Crowd Goes"	2011	Lemonade Mouth
"Don't Ya Wish U Were Us?"	2011	Lemonade Mouth

=== Music videos ===
List of music videos, showing year released and director
Title	Year	Director	Notes
"And the Crowd Goes"	2011	Patricia Riggen	Scenes from Lemonade Mouth
"Don't Ya Wish U Were Us?"	2011	Patricia Riggen	Scenes from Lemonade Mouth
"We Burnin' Up"	2011	—N/a	Adam Hicks's music video; featured video
"Fade In / Fade Out"	2019	Stephen Wayne Mallett	Nothing More's music video
