= Emily Chang (actress) =

American actress

- Born: Emily C. Chang; June 11, 1980 (age 46); Baton Rouge, Louisiana, US
- Education: University of Chicago, NYU's Tisch School of the Arts
- Occupations: Actress, writer, producer
- Years active: 2004–present
- Awards: New York Emmy Award
- Website: therealemily.com

Emily Chang (born August 11, 1980) is an American actress. She is known for playing the "Ba-zing!" girl in a 2012 commercial for Ruffles and the character Ivy in the television series The Vampire Diaries.

== Early life ==
Chang was born in Baton Rouge, Louisiana, and raised in Randolph, New Jersey. Her parents immigrated to America from Taiwan. Chang attended the University of Chicago and New York University.

== Career ==
Chang was a founding member of the Asian-American spoken word group I Was Born with Two Tongues, along with Denizen Kane. She worked as a host and spokesperson for ImaginAsian Entertainment, hosting the television series The Lounge from 2004 to 2007. She starred as Kay Ho in the independent film Colin Hearts Kay, which won the Audience Award in 2010 at both the Brooklyn Film Festival and The New York United Film Festival, where it also won Best Narrative Feature. In 2010, Chang won a New York Emmy Award for the documentary series On the Frontlines: Doing Business in China, along with her co-host James Fallows, of The Atlantic Monthly.

Chang has appeared in numerous commercials, including spots for Cablevision, WebMD, Carmax, Harrah's, Verizon, Honda, and Huntington Bank. Chang became best known as "Katie" ("the ba-zing girl") in a 2012 Ruffles Ultimate commercial, landing a spot in Complex magazine's "10 Hottest Women from Commercials."

Chang's television appearances include a recurring role on The Vampire Diaries plus guest roles on How I Met Your Mother, Brothers & Sisters, 90210, Ringer, and Community. She also played Phyllis Moss on NCIS and had a recurring role as Kathy Baker on The Young and the Restless. In Total Recall, Chang appeared as newscaster Lien Nguyen.

Chang has also written, produced, and starred in several short films, including "The Humberville Poetry Slam," which was a finalist for the Golden Reel Award and the Linda Mabalot New Directors/New Visions Award at the Los Angeles Asian Pacific Film Festival. Chang's short film "Mouthbreather," directed by Rules of Engagement writer/producer Gloria Calderon Kellett, was an official selection of the 2012 L.A. Comedy Shorts Film Festival and the 2012 Newport Beach Film Festival.

Chang won the Best Actress Award at the San Diego 48 Hour Film Project Film Festival, for her role as Suzy in the short film One Mistake. She completed the short film Parachute Girls in 2016, which she wrote, produced and starred in alongside Lynn Chen and Drew Powell.

== Filmography ==
=== Film ===
- Babysplitters (2020)
- Grass (2017)
- Take the 10 (2017)
- Parachute Girls (2016)
- Someone I Used to Know (2013)
- Cruel Will (2013)
- Total Recall (2012)
- Layover (2012)
- Shanghai Hotel (2011)
- Colin Hearts Kay (2010)

=== Television ===
- It's Always Sunny In Philadelphia (2019)
- Hawaii Five-0 (2018)
- The Bold Type (2017)
- New Girl (2016)
- The Vampire Diaries (2014)
- How I Met Your Mother (2014)
- Community (2014)
- Intelligence (2014)
- Days of Our Lives (2014)
- Bones (2013)
- NCIS (2012)
- The Young and the Restless (2012)
- Body of Proof (2012)
- Ringer (2012)
- 90210 (2011)
- Brothers & Sisters (2011)
