= Chris Wood (actor) =

American actor

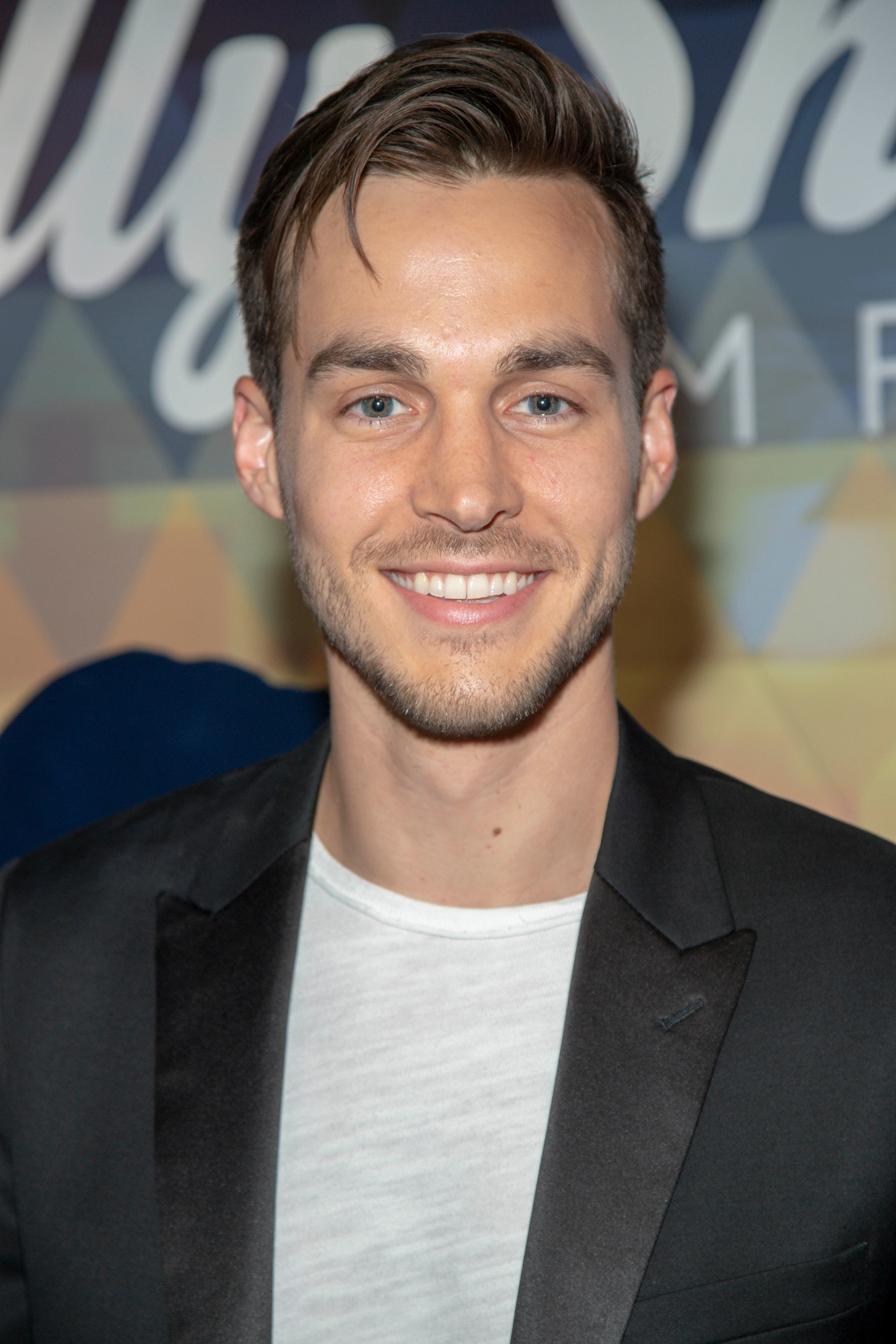
- Wood in 2019
- Born: Christopher Charles Wood; April 14, 1988 (age 38); Dublin, Ohio, U.S.
- Education: Elon University (BFA)
- Occupation: Actor
- Years active: 2010–present
- Spouse: Melissa Benoist (m. 2019)
- Children: 1

Christopher Charles Wood (born April 14, 1988) is an American actor. He is known for his role as Kai Parker in the sixth season of the CW's television series The Vampire Diaries in 2014, after previously appearing on The CW's The Carrie Diaries in the role of writer Adam Weaver in 2013. He also starred in the 2016 CW television series Containment in the starring role of Atlanta police officer Jake Riley. From 2016 to 2018, he played Mon-El on the CW superhero series Supergirl. In 2021, Wood voiced He-Man in Masters of the Universe: Revelation. In 2022, he played Russell Hammond in the Broadway musical Almost Famous.

== Early life ==
Wood was born in Dublin, Ohio. He attended Elon University in Elon, North Carolina, where he graduated in 2010, with a Bachelor of Fine Arts degree in Music Theater. He has been friends with actor Grant Gustin since college.

== Career ==
Wood began his professional career in the 2010–2011 national tour of Spring Awakening as Melchoir Gabor. Between 2011 and 2012, he worked in regional theater productions of The Little Mermaid and Damn Yankees.

In 2013, Wood made his first television appearances with the TV movie Browsers and the TNT series Major Crimes. In August of the same year, it was announced Wood had joined the cast for the second season of The CW's The Carrie Diaries as Adam Weaver in a recurring role.

In 2014, Wood joined the sixth season of The Vampire Diaries in a recurring role, playing the villain Malachi "Kai" Parker. He left the series in 2015 to pursue other projects but returned to the role on two occasions. He reprised the role for three episodes during The Vampire Diaries eighth and final season in 2017 and again in 2020 in a two-episode guest arc in the second season of the spinoff series Legacies.

In February 2015, Wood was cast in the pilot for the drama series Containment, portraying Jake Riley, a police officer trapped inside a quarantine zone. The series was picked up to order by The CW in May. Upon reading the pilot script, he said "I was just really drawn to the concept of this confined storyline. The characters are put in life-or-death situations that are very real—not every show has that element of stakes at that level." The series consisted of 13 episodes, running from April 19 to July 16, 2016, with The CW confirming in May Containment would not return for a second season. In that April it was also announced Wood had been cast in a 2-episode guest arc on the second season of the PBS period drama Mercy Street, reuniting with Carrie Diaries costar AnnaSophia Robb.

On July 20, 2016, it was announced Wood had joined the cast of Supergirl as a series regular in an undisclosed role, his fourth project with The CW. In August, executive producers confirmed he would be playing Mon-El in the show's upcoming second season. After being cast, Wood sat down with executive producer Greg Berlanti, who explained the character using musical theater references and as "a romantic sort of quietly good soul under this more frat boy exterior" Wood left the series at the end of the third season in 2018. He would briefly reprise the role for the 100th episode,"It's a Super Life" in 2020, and in 2021 for the series finale, "Kara."

In 2019, Wood wrote, directed, and produced his first short film The Stew, a comedy about a toxic marriage, starring Supergirl costar Melissa Benoist as the wife and Carlos Valdes as the husband. The Stew premiered on January 26, 2019 at the Vancouver Short Film Festival. In August of the same year, Wood's film was selected to screen at 2019 HollyShorts Film Festival, showing on opening night.

In February 2020, it was announced Wood had been cast as Leo Steadman in the pilot for Thirtysomething(else), a follow up series to the ABC drama Thirtysomething. In June, the network announced the series had not been picked up to air. Also in February 2020, Wood joined the voice cast for Kevin Smith's Masters of the Universe: Revelation series as Prince Adam/He-Man. The first series was released in two parts in July and November 2021.

Wood made his Broadway debut on November 3, 2022 in the production of Almost Famous playing Russell Hammond. The show closed on January 8, 2023 after mixed reviews and average audiences and grosses, playing a total of 30 previews and 77 shows. In March 2023, Wood released his second short film, Snowshoe, on YouTube. In addition to writing, directing, and producing the short, Wood starred opposite longtime friend Grant Gustin. Wood shot the film in one long continuous take in Whistler, British Columbia in March 2021.

In January 2024, Wood reprised the voice role of Prince Adam/He-Man in Masters of the Universe: Revolution, a sequel series to 2021's Masters of the Universe: Revelation.

In December 2024, it was announced Wood had been cast in Duo, an in development series for NBC. The project received a script commitment from the network, which is set to be written by Wood. He is also credited as a co-executive producer.

== Personal life ==
Wood began dating Supergirl co-star Melissa Benoist in 2017. They announced their engagement in February 2019 and married on September 1, 2019 in Ojai, California. They have one child, a son, born in 2020.

Wood played baseball throughout his childhood until the end of high school, having considered pursuing the sport professionally at one point. He is a supporter of the New York Yankees.

== Advocacy ==
Wood is an advocate for mental health causes. After his father's passing in 2011 due to a heart disease stemming from complications exacerbated by untreated and undiagnosed mood disorders, Wood turned his attention to the stigma and lack of resources surrounding mental health he felt hindered his father receiving help sooner. In 2016, he began an ambassadorship with Mental Health America, speaking at that year's annual conference. Wood has since partnered with Mental Health America on multiple occasions and served on the Board of Directors from June 2019 to 2021.

In October 2017, Wood founded IDONTMIND to promote open conversations on mental health, provide free education and resources, and raise funds for mental health programs. The first campaign launched by Wood raised $115,000 for National Alliance on Mental Illness through a line of minimalistic tee shirts bearing the organization's name. From 2018 to 2022, he ran IDONTMIND as a program of Mental Health America. Wood spearheaded the "Our Future in Mind" Summit with Mental Health America in November 2021, featuring conversations with fellow advocates Rainn Wilson, Zelda Williams, Tati Gabrielle and others on mental health. In March 2023, Wood registered IDONTMIND as a 501(c)3 nonprofit.

Wood has openly discussed his own struggles with mental health including anxiety, depression, and ADHD.

== Filmography ==
=== Film ===
Year	Title	Role	Notes
2019	The Stew	Writer, Director	Short film
2019	Jay and Silent Bob Reboot	Blunt-Fan	Cameo
2022	Clerks 3	Auditioner 9	Cameo
2023	Snowshoe	Kevin	Short film; Writer, Director

=== Television ===
Year	Title	Role	Notes
2013	Browsers	Justin	Television film
2013	Major Crimes	Brandon North	Episode: "Poster Boy"
2013–2014	The Carrie Diaries	Adam Weaver	6 episodes
2014	Girls	Paul	Episode: "Beach House"
2014–2017	The Vampire Diaries	Kai Parker	19 episodes
2016	Comedy Bang! Bang!	Perry Daffodil	Episode: "Tony Hale Wears a Blue Flannel Shirt and Fuchsia Sneakers"
2016	Containment	Jake Riley	Main role; 13 episodes
2016	Mercy Street	Cap. Lance Van Der Berg	2 episodes
2016–2021	Supergirl	Mon-El	Main role; 47 episodes
2017	The Flash	Mon-El / Tommy Moran	Episode: "Duet"
2020	Legacies	Kai Parker	2 episodes
2021–2024	Masters of the Universe: Revelation	Prince Adam / He-Man, Sailor	Main voice role; 14 episodes
TBD	Duo	Unknown	Main role; Writer; Co-Executive Producer; In development

=== Stage ===
Year	Title	Role	Venue	Ref
2010–2011	Spring Awakening	Melchior Gabor	Second National Tour	
2011	The Little Mermaid	Prince Eric	Music Theatre Wichita	
2012	Damn Yankees	Joe Hardy	Paper Mill Playhouse; 5th Avenue Theatre	
2018	Terms of Endearment	Flap Horton	Geffen Playhouse	
2022	Almost Famous	Russell Hammond	Bernard B. Jacobs Theatre	

== Awards and nominations ==
Year	Award	Category	Work	Result	Ref.
2015	Teen Choice Awards	Choice TV Villain	The Vampire Diaries	Nominated	
2017	Teen Choice Awards	Choice Action TV Actor	Supergirl	Nominated	
2017	Teen Choice Awards	Choice Liplock (with Melissa Benoist)	Supergirl	Nominated	
2017	Teen Choice Awards	Choice TV Ship (with Melissa Benoist)	Supergirl	Nominated	
