= Jodi Lyn O'Keefe =

American actress and model (born 1978)

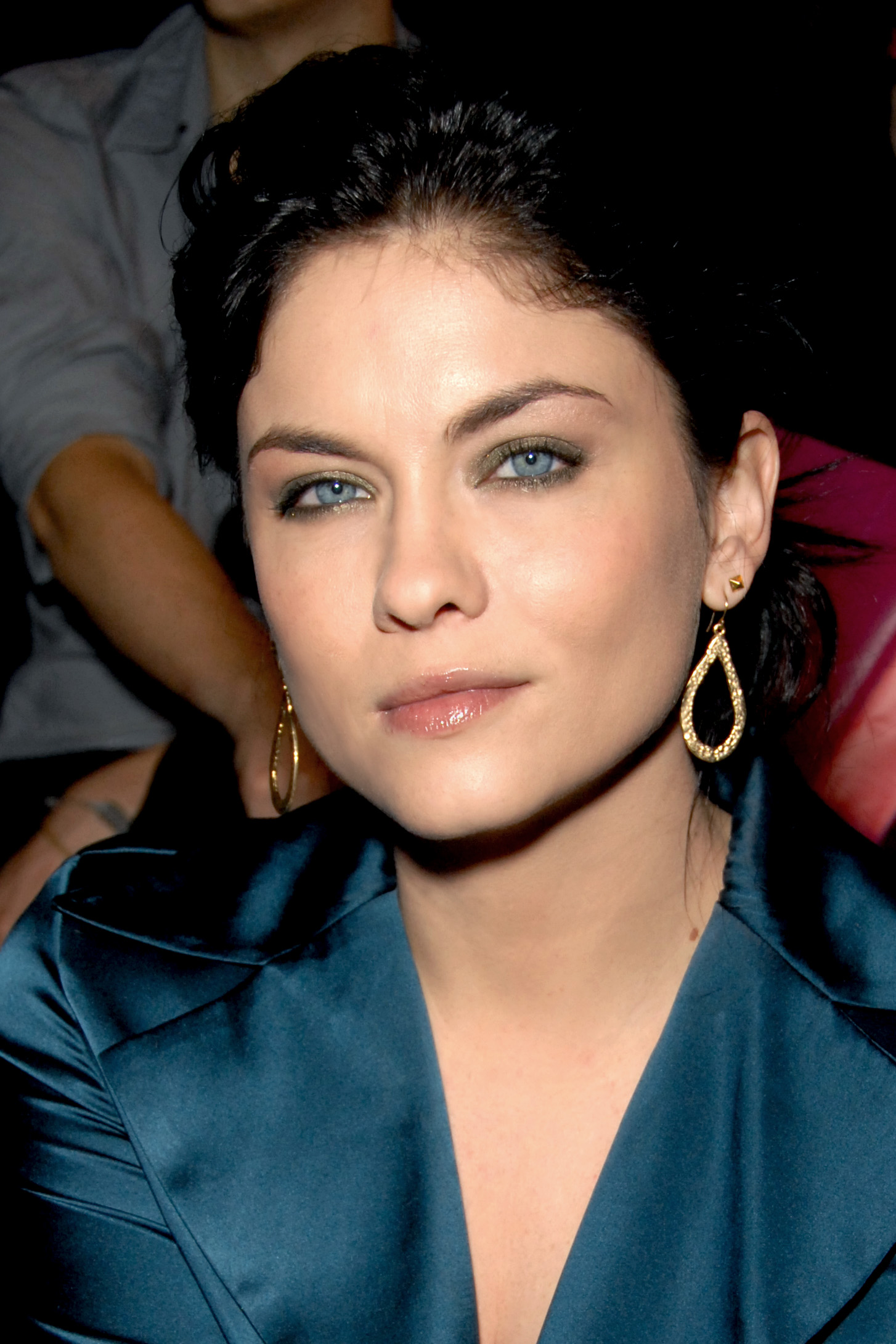
- O'Keefe at Los Angeles Fashion Week, Smashbox Studios, Culver City on March 9, 2008
- Born: October 10, 1978 (age 48); Cliffwood Beach, New Jersey, U.S.
- Other name: Jodi O'Keefe
- Occupations: Actress, model, fashion designer
- Years active: 1995–present
- Partner: Douglas Little

Jodi Lyn O'Keefe (born October 10, 1978) is an American actress, model and fashion designer. She came to prominence as Cassidy Bridges on the television series Nash Bridges (1996–2001) and played Gretchen Morgan on Prison Break (2007–2009), Jo Laughlin on The Vampire Diaries (2014–2017), and Lionel Davenport on Hit the Floor (2014–2018). Her film credits include Halloween H20: 20 Years Later (1998) and She's All That (1999).

== Early life ==
O'Keefe was born in the Cliffwood Beach section of Old Bridge Township , New Jersey.

She graduated from St. John Vianney High School.

== Career ==
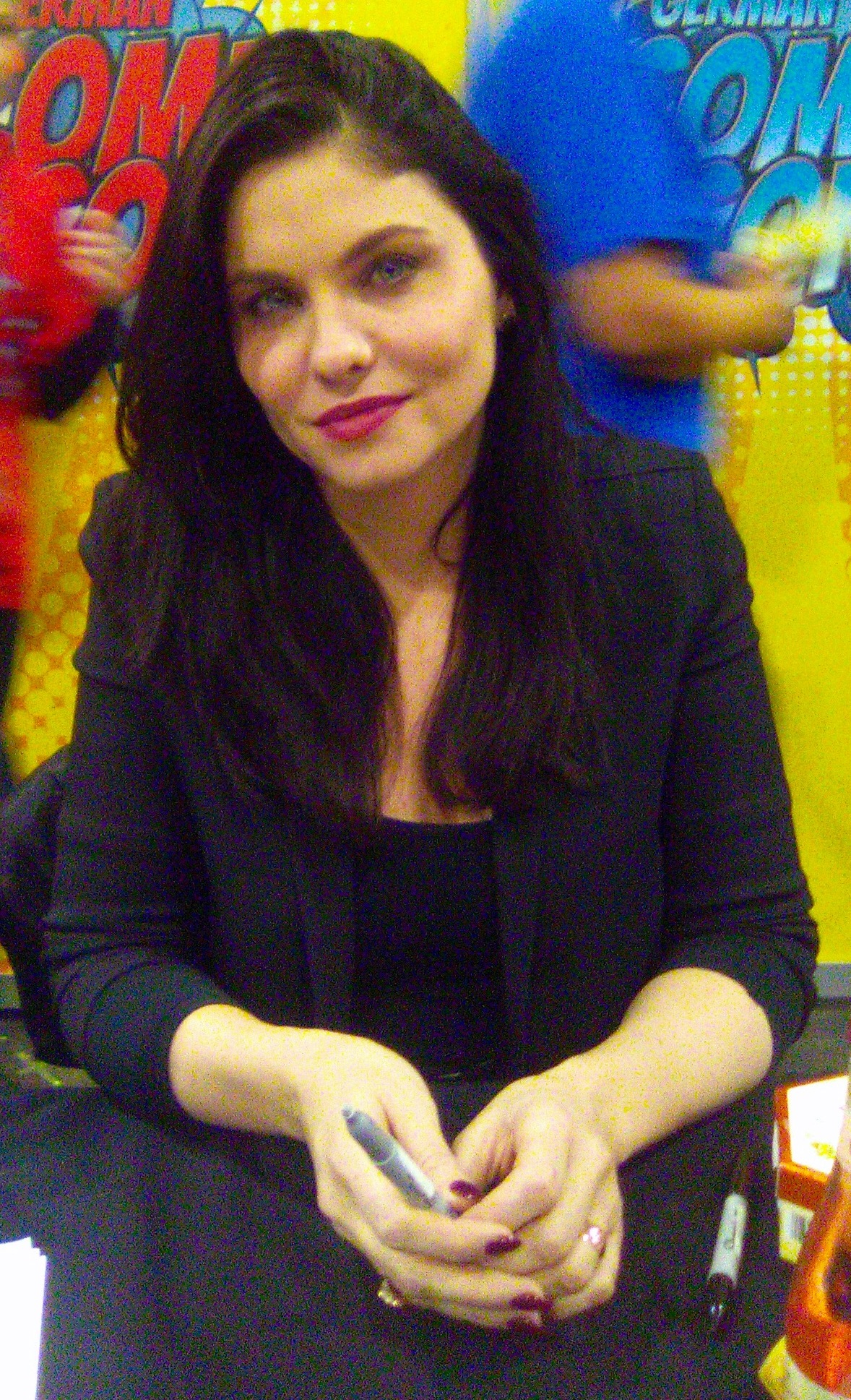
O'Keefe in 2016

O'Keefe started her career as a model at the age of eight, and she modeled for a jeans company. Midway through her junior year of high school, O'Keefe left school to star on the soap opera Another World, playing Marguerite "Maggie" Cory. She then got a role on Nash Bridges playing Cassidy, the daughter of Don Johnson's title character. She and her mother moved to Hollywood so O'Keefe completed her schooling by mail.

Her film debut was in 1998, in Halloween H20: 20 Years Later and later starred in such films as The Crow: Salvation, Whatever It Takes and Devil in the Flesh 2. In 1999, she co-starred in the teen film She's All That (1999) as Taylor Vaughan alongside Freddie Prinze Jr. and Rachael Leigh Cook. In 2004 she was in the music video "Let Me Go" by 3 Doors Down.

O'Keefe kept on filming both movies and Nash Bridges until the series ended in 2001. Later films have included Out for Blood, in which she played a vampire named Layla Simmons and Venice Underground. On the small screen, she has appeared in various shows including Dharma & Greg, Boston Legal, Two and a Half Men, Charmed, The Evidence, The Big Bang Theory, and Tru Calling.

In 2007, O'Keefe starred in the series Prison Break; in its third and fourth seasons. She said that she "truly loved" playing Gretchen Morgan, because it "challenged" her, and because Gretchen was the "polar opposite of her" and "was badass".

In 2014, O'Keefe was cast in a recurring role in VH1's TV series Hit the Floor, and appeared in the film Merry ExMas. That year, she had the recurring role of Jo in the sixth season of The CW series The Vampire Diaries. She reprised her role of Jo in the first season of Legacies.

In 2009, she appeared in the video game Command & Conquer: Red Alert 3 - Uprising.

On June 22, 2011, she started a clothing line, Queen George Clothing. In 2012, she launched a jewelry line, Q.

== Filmography ==
=== Film ===
Year	Film	Role	Notes
1998	Halloween H20: 20 Years Later	Sarah Wainthrope	
1999	She's All That	Taylor Vaughan	
2000	The Crow: Salvation	Lauren Randall	
2000	Whatever It Takes	Ashley Grant	
2000	Devil in the Flesh 2	Debbie Strand / Tracy Carlay	also known as Teacher's Pet
2003	Red Rover	Kylie Logan	
2004	Out for Blood	Layla Simmons	also known as Vampires: Out for Blood
2004	Mummy an' the Armadillo	Jackie	
2005	Venice Underground	Tyler	
2013	The Frozen Ground	Chelle Ringell	
2014	Merry ExMas	Ashley Williams	
2018	Edge of Fear	Gina	

=== Television ===
Year	Series	Role	Episodes
1995	Another World	Maggie Cory #4	6 episodes
1996–2001	Nash Bridges	Cassidy Bridges	Main role
1999	Happy Hour	Herself	1 episode
2002	Dharma & Greg	Simone	Episodes: "She's with the Band", "Mission: Implausible"
2002	George Lopez	Campbell Powers	Episodes: "Who's Your Daddy?", "The Wedding Dance"
2003	The Pool at Maddy Breaker's	Maddy Breaker	Television movie
2004	Tru Calling	Candace Aimes	Episode: "Reunion"
2004	The Help	Becky Wiggins	Episode: "Maggie Chicken"
2004	Charmed	Spider Demon	Episode: "Spin City"
2004	Two and a Half Men	Gail	Episode: "Last Chance to See Those Tattoos"
2004–2005	Boston Legal	Nora Jacobs	4 episodes
2005	Eve	Rita's Stepmother	Episode: "If the Shrew Fits"
2005	Adopted	Rachel Rabinowitz	Television movie
2005	Three Wise Guys	Mary Ann Davidson	Television movie
2005–2011	Two and a Half Men	Isabella	3 episodes
2006	Halloween: 25 Years of Terror	Herself	1 episode
2006	The Evidence	Officer Jackie Kazaris	Recurring role, 5 episodes
2006	Criminal Minds	Agent Amanda Gilroy	Episode: "P911"
2006	The 12th Man	Lindsay	Television movie
2007	CSI: NY	Melodee Constanza	Episode: "The Ride In"
2007	Raines	Angelina Billings	Episode: "Closure"
2007	The Call	Jenna "Kinky" Kincaid	Unsold television pilot
2007–2009	Prison Break	Gretchen Morgan	Main role (seasons 3–4), 32 episodes
2009	The Big Bang Theory	Mikayla, The Prostitute	Episode: "The Vegas Renormalization"
2009	Prison Break: The Final Break	Gretchen Morgan	Television movie
2010	Lost	Ava	Episode: "Recon"
2010	Soul Fire Rising	Lilith Reborn	3 episodes
2010	Class	Kylie Burch	Television movie
2011	Law & Order: LA	Jenn Mackie	Episode: "Angel's Knoll"
2011	Exposed	Emily Bennett	Television movie
2012	The Finder	Lisa	Episode: "A Cinderella Story"
2012	Castle	Kristina Coterra	Episode: "Cloudy with a Chance of Murder"
2012	A Nanny's Revenge	Gina Wright	Television movie; also known as The Avenger
2013	The Exes	Employee	Episode: "Toy Story"
2013	Stalkers	Julia Winston	Television movie; also known as Whisper of Fear
2014	Wall Street	Riley Simms	Television movie
2014–2017	The Vampire Diaries	Josette "Jo" Laughlin	Recurring role (seasons 6–7); guest role (season 8); 22 episodes
2014–2018	Hit the Floor	Lionel Davenport	Main role
2016	Lucifer	Ronnie Hillman	Episode: "The Would-Be Prince of Darkness"
2018	Legacies	Josette "Jo" Laughlin	Episode: "Mombie Dearest"
2021	Hip Hop Family Christmas	Vivian	Television film

=== Video games ===
- 2009 Command & Conquer: Red Alert 3: Uprising as Kelly Weaver
