= Penelope Mitchell =

Australian actress (born 1991)

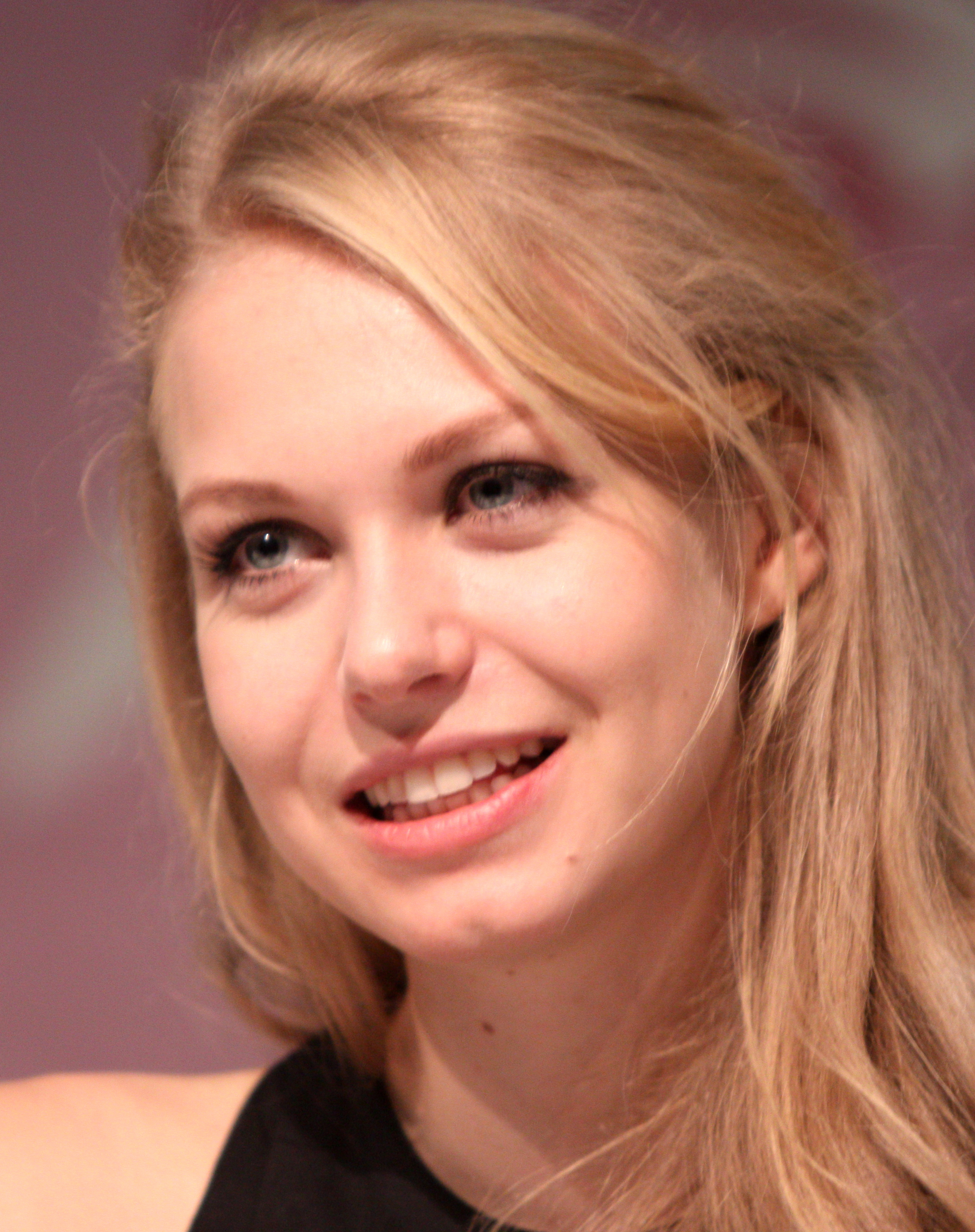
- Mitchell in 2013
- Born: 24 July 1991 (age 35); Melbourne, Victoria, Australia
- Occupation: Actress
- Years active: 2009–present

Penelope Mitchell (born 24 July 1991) is an Australian actress, best known for playing the roles of Letha Godfrey in the American horror television series Hemlock Grove, and Liv Parker in The Vampire Diaries.

== Early life ==
Born in Melbourne, Victoria to a French-born artist mother and an Australian entrepreneur father, Mitchell spent most of her childhood in Australia with her two older brothers. She studied ballet from age 4 to 16.

Mitchell finished in the top 1% of her graduating year, with an International Baccalaureate diploma. She attended Melbourne University, with the intention of becoming a lawyer. Mitchell completed her undergraduate degree in Arts (Media Communication), before moving to Los Angeles to pursue acting.

Mitchell is the granddaughter of Lester Mitchell, MBE, and Heather Mitchell, OBE, prominent agriculturalists and political activists. Heather Mitchell was the first female president of the National Farmers' Federation and co-founder of Landcare Australia with former Victorian Premier Joan Kirner.

She is a cousin of actress Radha Mitchell.

== Career ==
She began acting a few years before she landed her role on Hemlock Grove, appearing on shows including Toon Time, an Australian kids show, the ABC (Australia) show Next Stop Hollywood, which followed six Australian actors (including Mitchell) who move to Hollywood to audition for pilots, and an episode of Australian police drama Rush.

In the United States, Mitchell is known for her roles in the television series The Vampire Diaries and Hemlock Grove, as well as the films Hellboy and Zipper. She also appeared in the UPtv film The Time Capsule, and was later cast as Renée Picard in the television series Star Trek: Picard.

== Filmography ==
Film roles
Year	Title	Role	Notes
2011	The Fat Lady Swings	Sherry	Short film
2011	Nightshift of the Vampire	Sofia	Short film
2011	The Grace of Others	Grace	Short film
2011	Meth to Madness	Zoe	Short film
2012	The Wishful	Lula Doe / Princess Lula	Short film
2012	6 Plots	Jules Freeman	a.k.a. Six Graves
2012	Green Eyed	Sarah	Short film
2013	The Joe Manifesto	Sue	
2014	The Fear of Darkness	Skye Williams	
2015	Zipper	Laci/Jennifer	
2015	The Curse of Downers Grove	Tracy	
2015	The Waiting Game	Erica	Short film
2015	Curve	Ella Rutledge	
2017	Gnaw (Apartment 212)	Jennifer	
2018	The Midwife's Deception	Jina	
2018	Between Worlds	Billi	
2018	Look Away	Lily	
2019	Hellboy	Ganeida the Witch	
2020	Becoming	Lisa Corrigan	
2022	The Hyperions	Vista Mandulbaum	
2022	R.I.P.D. 2: Rise of the Damned	Jeanne	
2023	Muzzle	Mia	
2023	What You Wish For	Alice	
2024	Sting	Heather Miller	
2024	Oh, Canada	Sloan / Amy	

Television roles
Year	Title	Role	Notes
2009	Rush	Sarah	1 episode
2011	Offspring	Chrissy	Episode: "Cheating on Your Test"
2013	Hemlock Grove	Letha Godfrey	Main cast (season 1)
2014–15	The Vampire Diaries	Olivia 'Liv' Parker	Recurring role (seasons 5–6)
2018	The Time Capsule	Lauren	Television film
2022	Star Trek: Picard	Renée Picard	Recurring role (season 2)

Music video roles
Year	Title	Artist	Notes
2015	Lonely Town	Brandon Flowers	
