= Michael Malarkey =

British-American actor and musician (born 1983)

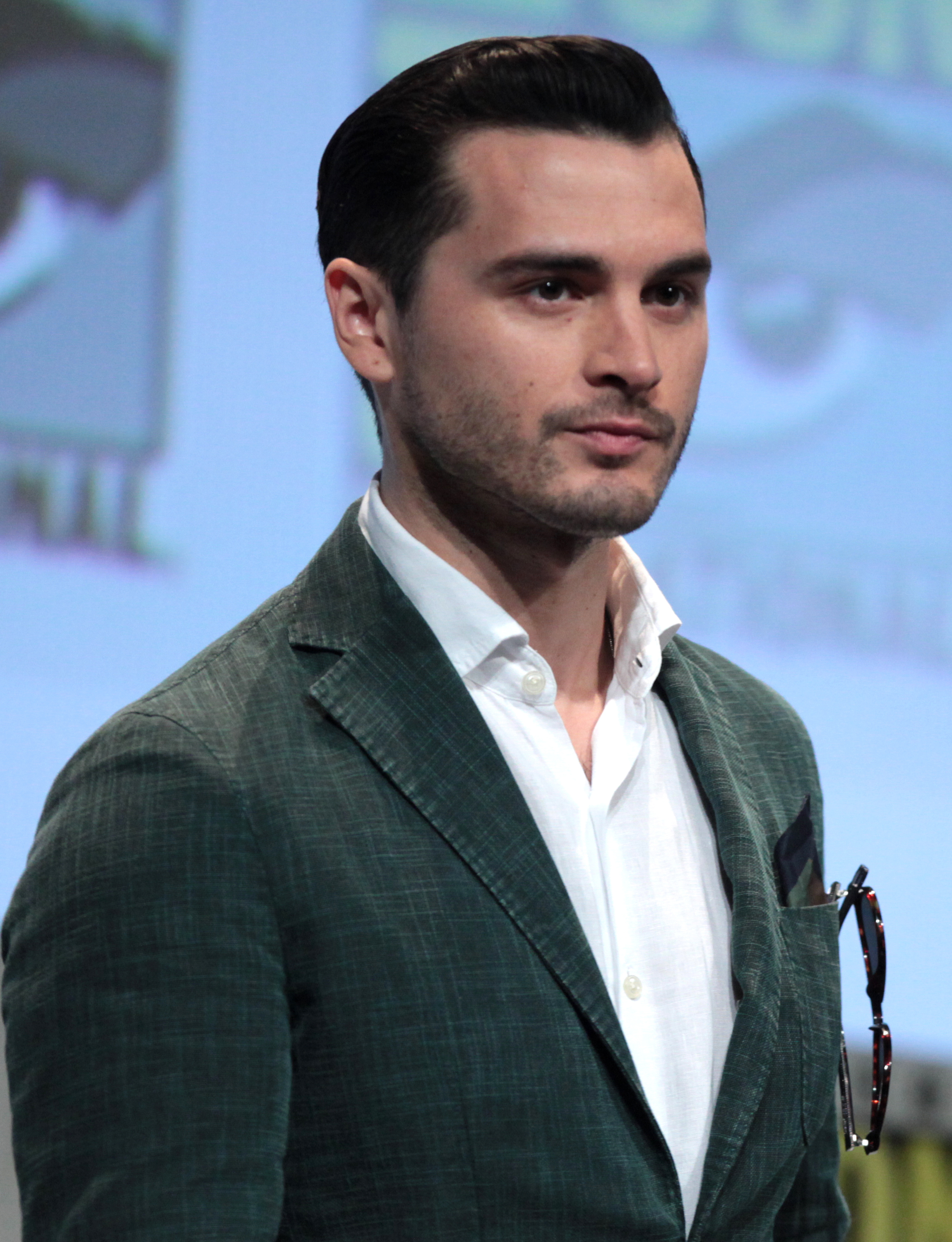
- Malarkey in 2015
- Born: 21 June 1983 (age 43); Beirut, Lebanon
- Education: London Academy of Music and Dramatic Art
- Occupations: Actor; musician
- Years active: 2009–present
- Known for: Enzo St. John on The Vampire Diaries; Captain Michael Quinn on Project Blue Book
- Spouse: Nadine Lewington (m. 2009)
- Children: 2

Michael Karim Malarkey (born 21 June 1983) is a British-American actor and musician. He is best known for playing the role of Enzo St. John in the series The Vampire Diaries.

== Early life ==
Malarkey was born in Beirut, Lebanon, to Jim Malarkey, an Irish American, and Nadia Bushrui, who has Palestinian and Italian origins. His grandfather was the famous Palestinian-Lebanese poet, Suheil Bushrui, the first Arab national to be appointed to the Chair of English at the American University of Beirut, a position he held from 1968 to 1986. He is the oldest of three brothers and was raised in Yellow Springs, Ohio. In 2006, Malarkey travelled to England to study at the London Academy of Music and Dramatic Art.

== Career ==
=== Acting ===
Malarkey had his beginnings on the London stage appearing in various theatre productions including lead roles in Spring Storm by Tennessee Williams and Beyond the Horizon by Eugene O'Neill at Royal National Theatre, an adaptation of The Great Gatsby in the role of Jay Gatsby and in the Original London Company of Million Dollar Quartet in the role of singer Elvis Presley.

Malarkey also appeared in several film and television projects including recurring roles in series' Raw for RTÉ, Mr. Sloane with Nick Frost and in the leading role for The CW pilot The Selection before landing the role of Lorenzo "Enzo" St. John in season 5 of the television series The Vampire Diaries as a recurring character. After gaining popularity with the viewing public, Malarkey's role was upgraded to a series regular starting in Season 6 and through the end of Season 8.

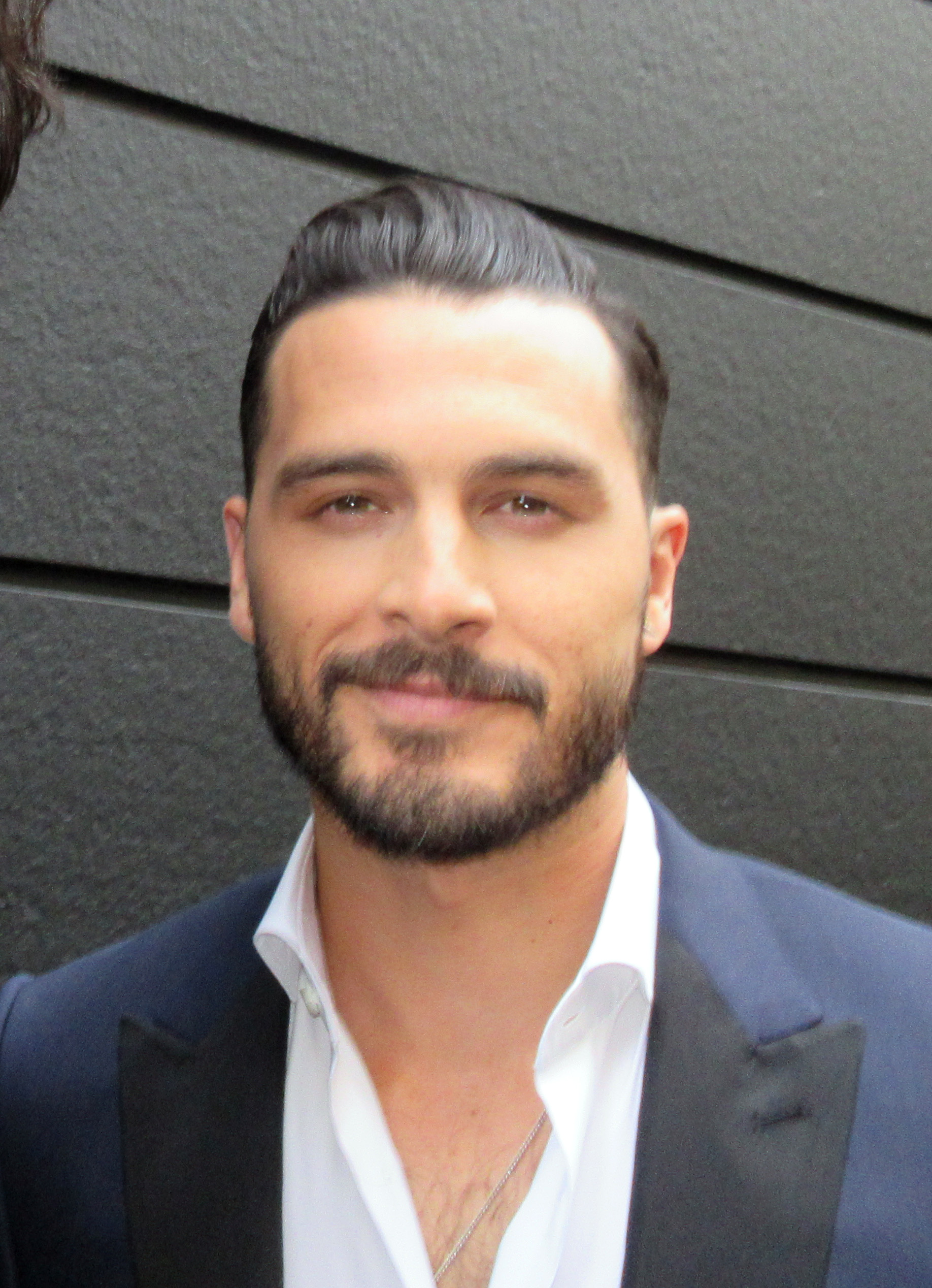
Malarkey in 2019

In 2017, he appeared as "Dizel" in an episode of Amazon Prime Video's Jean-Claude Van Johnson. In the following year, it was announced Malarkey was cast as "Sam Foster" in Crackle's crime drama series The Oath.

In 2019, Malarkey played the role of "Cinch Barton" in the thriller film A Violent Separation. That same year he starred as Captain Michael Quinn in Project Blue Book for The History Channel.

In September 2021, it was reported that Malarkey had a recurring role as Deputy Harvey on the second season of ABC's crime drama TV series Big Sky. He then appeared in Westworld and Quantum Leap in 2022 and in the third season of Law & Order: Organized Crime in 2023.

In February 2024, it was announced that Malarkey had joined the main cast for the second season of Netflix's conspiracy thriller series The Night Agent.

=== Music ===
After finishing high school, Malarkey joined a local hardcore band called Shadyside. He became the frontman when the lead singer left the band. Malarkey spent five years with the group touring and recording in Nashville while simultaneously learning guitar.

As a solo artist, after two EPs in 2014 and 2015, he released his debut full-length record, Mongrels on 8 September 2017 accompanied by music videos for singles "Uncomfortably Numb" and "Mongrels". The next year, he released another EP, Captain Solitaire. In January 2020, Malarkey released his second album, Graveracer.

== Personal life ==
Malarkey has been married to English actress Nadine Lewington since 2009; they have two sons, born in 2014 and 2019. They appeared together in one episode of Project Blue Book.

== Filmography ==
Film roles
Year	Title	Role	Notes
2009	Good Morning Rachel	Peter	Short film
2012	Ghost in the Machine	Cowboy	Short film
2013	Impirioso	Bruno	
2015	Oliver's Landing	Milo	Short film
2019	A Violent Separation	Cinch Barton	
2024	Degenerate	Freddy	Original title Dead Money

Television roles
Year	Title	Role	Notes
2011	Curiosity	Milton Long	Episode: "What Sank Titanic?"
2012	Dark Matters: Twisted But True	Sam, Alter, Frank Geyser	2 episodes
2013	Raw	Anthony	4 episodes
2013	The Selection	Prince Maxon	Unsuccessful The CW pilot
2013–2017	The Vampire Diaries	Lorenzo "Enzo" St. John	Recurring role (season 5); main role (seasons 6–8)
2014	Mr. Sloan	Craig	2 episodes
2017	Jean-Claude Van Johnson	Dizel	Episode: "What Year Do You This This Is?"
2017	Slavi's Show	Himself	Talk show
2018–2019	The Oath	Sam Foster	Recurring role
2019–2020	Project Blue Book	Captain Michael Quinn	Main role
2021	Big Sky	Deputy Harvey	Recurring
2022	Westworld	Emmett	3 episodes
2022	Quantum Leap	Cole	Episode: "July 13th, 1985"
2023	Law & Order: Organized Crime	Seamus O’Meara	3 episodes
2025	The Night Agent	Markus	Main role (season 2)
2026	Tracker	Adam Shevlin	Recurring (season 4)

=== Music video ===
Year	Title	Artist	Ref(s)
2019	"Now You're Gone"	Tom Walker	

=== Video games ===
Year	Title	Role
2014	Dragon Age: Inquisition	Havel/Dwarf/Herald's Rest Patron (voices)

== Theatre ==
- 2009: Inches Apart as Lee (Theatre 503, London – Winner of Theatre 503/Old Vic New Voices Award)
- 2010: Spring Storm as Arthur (The National Theatre, London)
- 2010: Beyond the Horizon as Robert (The National Theatre, London)
- 2011: Million Dollar Quartet (musical) as Elvis Presley (Original London Company – Noël Coward Theatre, West End)
- 2012: The Intervention as Jed (Assembly Rooms, Edinburgh)
- 2012: The Great Gatsby as Jay Gatsby (Wilton's Music Hall, London)

== Discography ==
Studio albums

- Mongrels (2017)
- Graveracer (2020)

EPs

- Feed the Flames (2014)
- Knots (2015)
- Captain Solitaire (2018)
- Strays (2022)
- Future Tense (2024)

Singles

- "Feed the Flames" (2014)
- "Dancing in the Grey" (2015)
- "Scars" (2017)
- "Mongrels" (2017)
- "Dog Dream" (2017)
- "I Just Want You" (2017)
- "Captain Solitaire" (2018)
- "To Be a Man (Mahogany Sessions)" (2018)
- "Graveracer" (2019)
