= Bad Moon Rising (The Vampire Diaries) =

- The Vampire Diaries episode
- Episode no.: Season 2 Episode 3
- Directed by: Patrick Norris
- Written by: Andrew Chambliss
- Cinematography by: Paul M. Sommers
- Editing by: Sean Albertson
- Production code: 2J5253
- Original air date: September 23, 2010

Guest appearances
- Taylor Kinney as Mason Lockwood; Courtney Ford as Vanessa Monroe; Tiya Sircar as Aimee Bradley

Episode chronology
← Previous "Brave New World"	Next → "Memory Lane"
- The Vampire Diaries season 2

"Bad Moon Rising" is the third episode of the second season of the American supernatural teen drama television series The Vampire Diaries, and the twenty-fifth of the series. It aired on The CW on September 23, 2010. The episode was written by executive story editor Andrew Chambliss and directed by Patrick Norris.

== Plot ==
Elena (Nina Dobrev), Stefan (Paul Wesley) and Damon (Ian Somerhalder) try to find out why the Gilbert device affected the Lockwood family as well and they ask for Alaric's (Matt Davis) help since he might know something from Isobel's research. Alaric mentions that Isobel also studied the lycanthropes but Damon says that if werewolves existed he would have met them by now. To find out more about it, Alaric, Elena and Damon leave for Duke University where Isobel's research results are while Stefan stays behind to help Caroline (Candice Accola) adjust to her new life as a vampire.

Meanwhile, Tyler (Michael Trevino) follows his uncle into the abandoned dungeon because he wants to know what he is hiding but he only finds scratches on the wall.

Stefan meets Bonnie (Kat Graham) to ask for her help with Caroline. He asks her to make a ring for her so she can be able to walk in the sun but Bonnie does not seem willing to do it. Stefan convinces her to do it but Bonnie promises him that if Caroline hurts anyone she will reverse the spell. They go to Caroline's and Bonnie spells a ring for her so Caroline can walk free outside during the day.

Damon tries to make Elena forgive him for trying to kill her brother by telling her that he had seen Jeremy (Steven R. McQueen) wearing the ring and he knew that he would be fine, but Elena does not believe him. They arrive at Isobel's office where her assistant Vanessa (Courtney Ford) is waiting for them. She acts friendly when they come and tells them about Isobel's research but when she gets out of the room she returns with a crossbow and shoots Elena. Damon jumps in front of Elena just in time and the arrow hits him while Alaric disarms Vanessa. Elena helps Damon take out the arrow. He says that he will kill Vanessa for what she did but Elena forbids him to do it. In the meantime, in the next room Vanessa tells Alaric that Katherine and Damon are dead and they cannot be standing in front of her.

Stefan tries to teach Caroline how to hunt animals to feed so she will not have to feed on people but all Caroline is thinking about is Matt (Zach Roerig) and that she wants to be with him at the swimming hole party that Tyler is throwing. Stefan agrees to let her go to the party and he goes with her. As soon as she gets there, she sees Amiee (Tiya Sircar), talking and flirting with Matt and she causes a scene. She compels Amiee to go and find a single man to flirt with. Matt does not like her being rude and he leaves her while Stefan points her out that Matt was right.

Meanwhile, Mason (Taylor Kinney) is back at the dungeon and tries to chain himself up since it is full moon and he will be turned into a werewolf. While he is trying to do it, Tyler arrives with Aimee and Mason runs away to his car so the two kids will not see him. He gets to his car and tries to chain himself to a tree but he cannot. A little further, Caroline and Matt make up but when Matt hurts his finger and bleeds, Caroline loses control and attacks him.

In the meantime, back at Duke, the three find out about the old Aztec legend "The curse of the sun and the moon" where an Aztec shaman cursed both vampires and werewolves to be slaves of the sun and servants of the moon respectively. They also find out that a werewolves' bite is fatal to vampires. Elena calls Stefan immediately to inform him about it so he knows to be careful around Mason and Tyler. Stefan realizes that Caroline is not at the party anymore and runs to find her. He gets to her and Matt just right in time to pull her away from Matt before she kills him.

Stefan tells Caroline that they have to run because there is a werewolf in the woods. They drive the werewolf away from Matt but they run into Tyler who slows them down and gives Mason the opportunity to attack Caroline. Stefan pushes him away but it is Tyler's order that makes him go away. Tyler later finds Mason's car and Mason arrives naked. Tyler tells him that it was him who attacked Caroline and Mason confirms it.

Elena asks Vanessa about her resemblance to Katherine and why she looks like her but Vanessa doesn't have much info to give her about that. On their way to the car to get back home, Damon gives Elena a book he found at Isobel's office with the title "Petrova", telling that it is Katherine's real name. Elena takes the book but she is still mad at Damon and at his question if he lost her friendship forever, Elena answers him by thanking him for the book. Then Later when they arrive at Elena's house, she asks Damon if he truly knew that Jeremy was wearing the ring when Damon tried to kill him and Damon answered "No" Elena then goes on saying "The answer to your question, about our friendship, yes you have lost me forever."

Caroline and Stefan get back to Matt and Caroline compels him to forget what happened. Stefan tells her that he will make sure to give Matt vervain jewellery to protect him and also to drink so she will not be able to bite him again. The two of them have a conversation where Stefan tells her that leaving Elena would be the right thing to protect her but he cannot. Later, when Caroline sees Amiee flirting again with Matt, she causes a scene despite the fact that she promised Matt not to do it again, forcing him to break up with her since that is the only way she can protect him.

The episode ends with Katherine appearing at Caroline's bedroom and telling her that the two of them are going to have so much fun together.

== Feature music ==
In "Bad Moon Rising" we can hear the songs:

- "Under My Bed" by Meiko
- "Changes" by Stars
- "Ashes and Wine" by A Fine Frenzy
- "In Your Skin" by Lifehouse
- "Fantasy Friend Forever" by The Asteroid Galaxy Tour
- "Send a Little Love Token" by The Duke Spirit
- "Breathe Again" by Sara Bareilles

== Reception ==
=== Ratings ===
In its original American broadcast, "Bad Moon Rising" was watched by 3.57 million; up by 0.52 from the previous episode.

=== Reviews ===
"Bad Moon Rising" received good reviews.

Matt Richenthal of TV Fanatic rated the episode with 4.4/5. "Overall, "Bad Moon Rising" was an action-packed episode that shed light on the Lockwoods and werewolves in general. I'd have been content with it even before Katherine showed up and told Caroline they were gonna have "so much fun together.""

The TV Chick gave the episode a B+ rate. "I liked it very much, but I wasn’t edge of my seat or anything. But, I’m glad we learned a little bit more about the werewolf lore as every writer has a different story for their supernatural beings. I’m also loving the development of Caroline’s character. She’s getting really awesome. I am most interested to see what the deal with the doppelganger situation is though. There are so many interesting places that they could take this storyline."

Josie Kafka from Doux Reviews rated the episode with 3/4 saying that the episode was full of great scenes and great lines while Robin Franson Pruter of Forced Viewing rated it with only 2/4 saying that the episode failed to deliver engrossing drama. "This episode is not horribly flawed. It’s just mediocre, and we’ve come to expect better than that from the series. The biggest problem with the episode is the large amount of exposition it must convey.

Diana Steenbergen from IGN rated the episode with 7.5/10 saying that the werewolves are finally here. "The "revelation" may not be surprising to the audience, but it's a relief that it is finally out there; hopefully this plotline will move forward a bit quicker now. The fact that werewolf bites are deadly to vampires adds some danger for our town vampires, turning the tables on them as they become the prey."

Den of Geek gave a good review to the episode stating: "All in all I think that this episode really showed us that The Vampire Diaries has hit its stride. Now it’s time for them to keep the flame alive, which they should be able to do, given that they have a talented cast, great writers and an interested audience. Not to mention the reappearance of Katherine, which I know has me begging next Thursday night to come a little bit faster!"
