= Plan B (The Vampire Diaries) =

- The Vampire Diaries episode
- Episode no.: Season 2 Episode 6
- Directed by: John Behring
- Written by: Elizabeth Craft; Sarah Fain
- Cinematography by: Paul M. Sommers
- Editing by: Sean Albertson
- Production code: 2J5256
- Original air date: October 21, 2010

Guest appearances
- Marguerite MacIntyre as Liz Forbes; Taylor Kinney as Mason Lockwood

Episode chronology
← Previous "Kill or Be Killed"	Next → "Masquerade"
- The Vampire Diaries season 2

"Plan B" is the sixth episode of the second season of the American supernatural teen drama television series The Vampire Diaries, and the twenty-eighth of the series. It aired on The CW on October 21, 2010. The episode was written by consulting producers Elizabeth Craft and Sarah Fain, and directed by John Behring.

== Plot ==
The episode starts with the scenes switching between Elena (Nina Dobrev) with Stefan (Paul Wesley) and Katherine with Mason (Taylor Kinney) waking up together. Elena and Stefan talk about how to keep hiding from Katherine and she keeps feeding Stefan with her blood, meanwhile Katherine tries to make Mason tell her where he hid the moonstone, however he tells her that it is safe and that he will give it to her later that night.

Jeremy (Steven R. McQueen) pays a visit to Damon (Ian Somerhalder) because he wants to help, as he says, and tells Damon what he has learnt about werewolves from Tyler (Michael Trevino) and that Mason is looking for a moonstone. Alaric (Matt Davis) arrives with more information from Isobel's research that says that moonstones can be used to seal a curse and they wonder if Mason wants it so he can reverse the werewolf curse.

Everyone is at the preparations for the Masquerade Ball and Elena gets the chance to fill Bonnie (Kat Graham) in on everything around Katherine and what she was doing all this time with Caroline (Candice Accola) and her fake fights with Stefan. Meanwhile, Mason looks surprised to see Stefan alive and he asks him what they did to Sheriff Forbes (Marguerite MacIntyre). Stefan reassures him that Liz is fine and Mason leaves. While walking away, Mason bumps into Bonnie who gets a vision of him and "Elena". She tells Stefan about it and he figures out that Bonnie did not see Elena kissing Mason but Katherine.

Stefan informs Damon about the connection between Mason and Katherine and they are sure that Katherine is using him for something and they need to find out what. Jeremy offers his help and says that he can take the moonstone from Tyler, but Tyler gave the moonstone to Mason because he doesn't want to have anything to do with curses and supernatural anymore. Stefan and Damon ask for Bonnie's help so they can "kidnap" Mason and make him tell them Katherine's plan and where the moonstone is. Even though at first Bonnie does not want to help, she eventually agrees to do it.

In the meantime, Caroline is at the basement with her mom and tries to explain to her about her new life. Liz listens to her and even though she is negative with Caroline at the beginning, Liz ends up telling her that she doesn't have to compel her because she will never do anything to hurt her. Caroline believes her but she knows that Liz will never trust Damon and Stefan, so she compels her to forget everything and think that she has been sick with the flu for the past couple of days.

Damon and Bonnie arrive at the Salvatore house with Mason and Damon ties him up to question him while Bonnie tries to read his mind with her powers to find out where the moonstone is. She tells Damon that the moonstone is in a well and heads out when Mason wakes up. On her way out, she runs into Caroline and tells her that she is going to the old well at the Lockwood property. Caroline wants to go with her and Bonnie texts Stefan where he can find the moonstone. He heads there and Elena follows him.

Damon starts questioning Mason about Katherine but he refuses to say anything, leading Damon to torture him. After a while, Mason tells Damon where the moonstone is, but Damon wants to know why Katherine wants it. Mason says she wants it to reverse the werewolf curse because she loves him, something that makes Damon burst out laughing. He tells Mason that Katherine is just using him and when he realizes that Mason does not know anything more that could help him, he kills him.

In the meantime, Stefan gets to the well with Elena and he jumps in to search for the moonstone, but the water is full of vervain and he starts screaming for help. Caroline and Bonnie find them, and they help Elena to get down to Stefan. She ties the unconscious Stefan to the chain and tells Caroline to pull him up while she is searching for the moonstone. She finds it and Caroline pulls her up where she gives Stefan her blood to help him heal faster.

Stefan returns home where Damon tries to get rid of Mason's body. He texts Carol (Susan Walters) from Mason's phone to tell her that he left town and then calls Katherine despite Stefan's warning not to. Katherine is surprised and when Damon reveals to her that Mason is dead and they have the moonstone, she reassures him that she has a Plan B.

Alaric and Jenna (Sara Canning) are having dinner when Elena get home. Katherine calls and asks for Elena telling her that she knows about her fake fights with Stefan because she had warned Jenna off of vervain and could control her and Jenna has been informing her about everything. In the background, Jenna stabs herself while under Katherine's compulsion and collapses. Alaric and Elena take her to the hospital and the doctor informs them that she will be fine.

Elena, after what happened with Jenna, goes to Stefan to tell him that they were fools to ignore Katherine's orders and to fool her. They cannot be together because they put the ones they love in danger and she breaks up with him.

The episode ends with Katherine compelling Matt (Zach Roerig) to attack Tyler and won't step back until Tyler kills him because as she says she needs a werewolf and since Mason is gone, she needs a new one.

== Feature music ==
"Plan B" features the following songs:

- "This = Love" by The Script
- "Tighten Up" by The Black Keys
- "Science of Fear" by The Temper Trap
- "Wires" by Athlete

== Reception ==
=== Ratings ===
In its original American broadcast, "Plan B" was watched by 3.62 million; up by 0.15 from the previous episode.

=== Reviews ===
"Plan B" received positive reviews.

Matt Richenthal of TV Fanatic rated the episode with 4.8/5 saying that the episode was dark, shocking and exciting. "Did anyone actually expect Damon to kill Mason?!? Shades of this vampire's humanity appeared to be coming out after he realized Mason was just like him (only less dashing and intelligent), seduced by Katherine's charms and being manipulated. But that's what makes Damon such an intriguing character."

Diana Steenbergen from IGN rated the episode with 8.5/10 praising Candice Accola's acting: "Every episode I find myself having more good things to say about Candice Accola's portrayal of Caroline. While this week has the very sad (and real) breakup of Stefan and Elena, it is Caroline's time spent with her mother that is the most heartbreaking. [...] The journey Accola is taking Caroline through this season continues to be one of the more compelling storylines on the show."

Josie Kafka of Doux Reviews rated the episode with 3.9/4 thanking the writers (Elizabeth Craft and Sarah Fain) for their work on the episode. "Elizabeth Craft and Sarah Fain have worked on some great shows, but I never loved their episodes on Angel or Dollhouse. So I was both nervous and excited when I saw that this was their first VD episode. And then I forgot all about both nerves and excitement, as I was too busy hooting with merriment and then, at the end, gasping a "No they didn’t!" at the unanswering TV screen. And then doing it again, five minutes later."

Alyse Wax from Fearnet gave a good review to the episode saying that it was good and brutal. "I don’t think I have ever seen such intense torture on network television. I honestly did not see it coming that Jenna would be compelled to stab herself. It was an intense episode, with lots of darkness, and not too much mushy-gushy stuff."

Reagan from The TV Chick gave a B+ rate to the episode saying that it was another great one with a lot of information and several touching moments. "I can’t wait for the masquerade ball and to see who else will crop up this season (surely we’re not going to fight only Katherine and it’s still early in the season). [...] My score’s a little lower because I really think they killed off Hot Uncle Mason a little early."

Despite the positive reaction, Robin Franson Pruter of Forced Viewing rated the episode with 2/4 saying that the episode had a few good scenes but was hampered by excessive violence. "The violence in this episode is unrelenting and largely unmotivated. I felt bad for Mason. [...] The torture scenes that follow are out of character for Damon and extreme enough to make even Dick Cheney uncomfortable. [...] The violence wouldn’t bother me so much if it was 1) in character; 2) in service of good-storytelling; or 3) socially responsible. Damon is erratic but not a sadist."
