= Brave New World (The Vampire Diaries) =

- The Vampire Diaries episode
- Episode no.: Season 2 Episode 2
- Directed by: John Dahl
- Written by: Brian Young
- Cinematography by: Paul M. Sommers
- Editing by: Nicholas Erasmus
- Production code: 2J5252
- Original air date: September 16, 2010

Guest appearances
- Taylor Kinney as Mason Lockwood; B. J. Britt as Carter

Episode chronology
← Previous "The Return"	Next → "Bad Moon Rising"
- The Vampire Diaries season 2

"Brave New World" is the second episode of the second season of the American supernatural teen drama television series The Vampire Diaries, and the twenty-fourth of the series. It aired on The CW on September 16, 2010. The episode was written by story editor Brian Young and directed by John Dahl.

== Plot ==
Caroline (Candice Accola) wakes up in the hospital after Katherine (Nina Dobrev) killed her and she is hungry. She asks for food from the nurse but she sends her back to bed. Caroline smells blood from the next room and without knowing what is happening to her, she takes the blood bag to her room and starts drinking.

Bonnie (Kat Graham) and Elena prepare the school carnival and talk about Caroline. Elena doesn't want to talk about vampires or Damon (Ian Somerhalder) especially after he killed Jeremy (Steven R. McQueen). Meanwhile, Stefan (Paul Wesley) gives Jeremy a jewel that contains vervain and explains him that it will protect him from compulsion. He also tells him how a vampire dies but asks him to forget about Damon and not try to seek revenge.

Mrs. Lockwood (Susan Walters) calls Damon at her place to inform him that she will take over as acting Mayor now that her husband is dead until someone else replaces him and she wants Damon to take the lead on the Council. Damon accepts her offer when Tyler (Michael Trevino) and Mason (Taylor Kinney) return home. Damon overhears what they say and is trying to figure out what they are but he only learns about Tyler's strange anger issues.

Back in the hospital, Caroline discovers that her skin burns in the sunlight. Matt (Zach Roerig) shows up to visit her and tells her that she will get released from the hospital next morning. Caroline is terrified to have to go out during the day and tries to convince him that she has to be released that night. Matt notices her strange behavior especially when he tries to open the curtains and Caroline jumps to the other side of the room demanding that he close them. Matt leaves and Caroline continues drinking from the blood bag completing her transformation. She also discovers that the vervain necklace that Elena gave her burns her skin and throws it away. The nurse, who enters at that moment, takes the necklace to give it back to her but Caroline attacks her and drinks from her, after she compels her.

At the carnival, Bonnie and Elena try for everything to be fine and they ask Carter (B. J. Britt), a carnival employee, to help them with the karaoke speakers. Damon tries to talk to Jeremy like nothing happened between them but when Jeremy threatens to expose what he is, Damon shows him how easily can take off the ring from Jeremy's finger and kill him again.

Mason is looking for something at his brother's office when Tyler gets in and asks him what he is searching for. Mason explains that he needs an old family heirloom, a moonstone. Tyler says that he does not know where it might be and they should ask his mom about it. They both leave to attend the carnival and when they get there, the Salvatores watch them trying to figure out their nature. They watch them challenge each other to an arm wrestling contest that Mason wins easily. Damon volunteers Stefan to be the next opponent and Stefan loses telling Damon that Mason is not a vampire, but he is stronger than a normal human. Damon compels Carter to pick a fight with Tyler in order to finally find out what the Lockwoods are.

Back at the hospital, Caroline can now leave thanks to the compelled nurse who prepared her papers. Caroline also compelled her with a story about the bite on her neck and leaves to go check on Elena and Bonnie at the carnival. At the carnival, she finds Damon and tells him that she remembers everything he did to her when they first met. Damon is confused because that cannot be happening unless she is turning into a vampire. Caroline delivers Katherine's message and when Damon approaches her she flings him down onto his back and leaves.

Meanwhile, Stefan follows Carter and sees him picking a fight with Tyler in the parking lot. Mason intervenes to stop them, he vaults over a car and leaps ten feet into the air before he lands on all fours. Tyler notices his glowing yellow eyes before Mason turns to Carter. They both leave the scene and Stefan runs to check on Carter who does not know why he got into the fight. Back home, Tyler asks Mason what happened to his eyes during the fight but Mason refuses to admit anything and he tells Tyler that it was nothing. Tyler sneaks away and opens the secret safe at his dad's office where he finds, among documents and other things, the moonstone Mason is looking for and takes it.

Damon, after his meeting with Caroline, discusses with Elena and Stefan what they should do. Damon says that they have to kill her because her knowledge will endanger them, but Elena and Stefan do not agree. They start looking for Caroline who is wandering the carnival and she is hungry. She finds Carter, who's bleeding after his encounter with Tyler and Mason, and attacks him. In another part of the carnival, Matt tells Bonnie that Caroline has been acting crazy all day. She says it's normal for her to be emotional after almost dying but Matt says it was more than that.

Stefan and Elena keep searching for Caroline. Stefan smells blood and they head in that direction. Damon finds Caroline first who is confused and she now feels guilty for killing Carter. Damon promises that he will help her and when he is ready to stake her, Stefan arrives and stops him. Damon tries to stake her again, but this time Elena gets between them and tells him to stop. He does, but he tells Elena that anything that happens now is on her.

Bonnie arrives at the scene and realizes that Caroline is a vampire. Stefan takes Caroline away to help her and tell her how she can control her hunger and he promises that he will not let anything happen to her. Caroline asks him why Katherine turned her, but he doesn't know. Outside, Bonnie attacks Damon because she blames him for everything bad that has happened. She uses her powers to light a fire and starts burning him. Elena manages to stop her and they leave.

Damon returns home and finds Jeremy waiting for him with a stake in his hand. He came to kill him but changed his mind and warns Damon not to drink from the whiskey bottle since he put vervain in it. He shows Damon a stake and says he came there to kill him, but then throws it away. Damon asks him why he changed his mind. Jeremy says his father and his uncle hated vampires because they were taught to, but he realizes that killing Damon wouldn't solve anything. Damon says his father felt the same way. Jeremy leaves.

Matt sneaks into Caroline‘s room and tells her that even though she was acting crazy today, he loves her. They hug. Her face starts to change, but she does the breathing exercise Stefan showed her and it changes back to normal.

The episode ends with Stefan trying to give Elena a normal ending to her day making her wish come true. He takes her back to the now closed carnival and then jumps with her to the top of the Ferris Wheel where they admire the view and kiss.

== Feature music ==
In "Brave New World" we can hear the songs:

- "Geraldine" by Glasvegas
- "Animal" by Neon Trees
- "All This Time" by OneRepublic
- "Currency of Love" by Silversun Pickups
- "The Ladder" by Andrew Belle

== Reception ==
=== Ratings ===
In its original American broadcast, "Brave New World" was watched by 3.05 million; down by 0.23 from the previous episode.

=== Reviews ===
"Brave New World" received positive reviews.

Steve Marsi of TV Fanatic rated the episode with 4/5 praising the acting of the secondary characters of the show: "There's a new vampire in Mystic Falls, one quite unlike any we've seen to date. Katherine is gone, for now, but her presence still looms. The Lockwoods are definitely not human. Bonnie has some serious powers and will not hesitate to unleash them. "Brave New World" fleshed out all of these components as brilliantly as we've come to expect, thanks to surprisingly strong acting from a CW series. Katerina Graham, Michael Trevino and particularly Candice Accola were terrific Thursday night."

Diana Steenbergen from IGN rated the episode with 8/10 saying that the episode takes the time to set up new storylines for the season but disagrees on how slow the Lockwood story evolves. "A lot of time this episode is spent with the Lockwood family "secret", which may be unknown to the characters on the show, but is pretty clearly about werewolves. It is obvious enough that the show needs to get that storyline moving much quicker; it is the only point in this episode where things bog down."

Robin Franson Pruter of Forced Viewing rated the episode with 3/4 saying that Candice Accola shines as a new vampire. "The Vampire Diaries had a good run of five straight four-star episodes, but no show can maintain that level of quality for every episode. "Brave New World" settles in place as a good, if not extraordinary, effort. [...] Ultimately, there's nothing really poorly done with this episode. It's just not extraordinary. What's impressive is that it manages not to be a letdown after the previous group of exceptional episodes.

Josie Kafka of Doux Reviews rated the episode with 3.5/4. "I groaned quite a few times during this episode. "Oh, I can't believe they're doing that. It's so cliché, and it's been done before" [...] And then, moments (well, sometimes minutes) later, I realized that I should sit back and trust the man who brought us the Scream franchise. It's not Vicky Donovan, 2.0. It's not Token Black Guy and Racially Appropriate Relationship. It's The Vampire Diaries, and it's damn good."

The TV Chick gave a B+ rate to the episode saying: "I liked it a lot, but I want to leave room for more awesomeness ahead. It definitely opened up some interesting paths for us (Damon the head of the council, werewolf madness, Caroline and Stefan's Mr. Myagi/Ralph Macchio relationship). I can't wait to see where the writers take us this season because this show is always action packed."

Meg of Two Cents TV gave a good review to the episode, also praising Accola for her acting, naming her the MVV (most-valued-vamp) of the episode. "This was a good follow-up to the premiere. The supporting characters (Tyler, Caroline, Jeremy) really brought their A game tonight. I'm also glad the show is giving Caroline more depth. I really hope she sticks around!"

Den of Geek gave a good review to the episode saying: "All in all, Brave New World really made me look forward to where the story is taking us and what the future holds for our favourite residents of Mystic Falls. In my opinion this season is off to a great start. They're throwing new elements at us, as well as new foes."
