= The Return (The Vampire Diaries) =

- The Vampire Diaries episode
- Episode no.: Season 2 Episode 1
- Directed by: J. Miller Tobin
- Written by: Kevin Williamson; Julie Plec
- Cinematography by: Paul M. Sommers
- Editing by: Joshua Butler
- Production code: 2J5251
- Original air date: September 9, 2010

Guest appearances
- Marguerite MacIntyre as Liz Forbes; David Anders as John Gilbert; Taylor Kinney as Mason Lockwood

Episode chronology
← Previous "Founder's Day"	Next → "Brave New World"
- The Vampire Diaries season 2

"The Return" is the first episode of the second season of the American supernatural teen drama television series The Vampire Diaries, and the twenty-third of the series. It aired on The CW on September 9, 2010. The episode was written by series developers Kevin Williamson and Julie Plec and directed by producer J. Miller Tobin.

== Plot ==
The episode starts from exactly where the last episode of the first season ends. Elena (Nina Dobrev) walks in the door and she hears a noise in the kitchen that makes her go check what is happening. She finds John (David Anders) lying on the floor and she immediately calls 911. Katherine is standing right behind her and John warns her about it. Elena grabs the knife and tries to see who is in the house but Katherine leaves before the two meet. Elena rushes to Jeremy's (Steven R. McQueen) and finds him unconscious in his bed.

The paramedics take John away when Stefan (Paul Wesley) arrives and checks Jeremy to see if he is a vampire. Stefan says that he is still a human and he assumes that Jeremy did not take enough pills to really kill himself and Anna's blood healed him. He warns Jeremy not to try it again since the vampire blood exits his system very quickly and he could easily end up killing himself for real.

Bonnie (Kat Graham) gets to the hospital and finds Matt (Zach Roerig) waiting outside Caroline's (Candice Accola) room. Matt tells her about the accident and how Tyler (Michael Trevino) lost control because of sound he said he was hearing. Damon (Ian Somerhalder) also arrives at the hospital and checks on Liz (Marguerite MacIntyre) who asks him to find out why Mayor Lockwood was affected by the vampire device, something that led to his death.

Elena gets to the hospital and asks Bonnie if she can do a spell to save her life but Bonnie is not trained enough to do something that difficult. Damon shows up and offers to give Caroline his blood to heal her. Elena has her doubts about it but she finally agrees after Bonnie's urge. Damon tries to bring up the kiss when he stays along with Elena but Elena has no idea what he is talking about. Jenna (Sara Canning) arrives and when Elena cannot remember talking to her either, Damon figures out that Katherine is back in town.

Katherine arrives at the Gilbert house to find Stefan who's there to keep an eye on Jeremy. She tries to kiss him but Stefan realizes that is not Elena and pushes her away. The two of them fight a little before Elena and Damon walked in and Katherine disappears. They try to figure out why Katherine is back and what she is up to and Damon also admits that he kissed Katherine thinking she was Elena, something that makes Stefan upset. Elena stops them before they get into a fight.

Mason Lockwood (Taylor Kinney) is back in town for his brother's funeral; he has been away for years. Tyler seems surprised to see him and Damon asks Liz if he is also in the council. Liz tells him that Mason is not a believer of the supernatural.

Stefan and Elena go to the hospital to talk to John and find out more about Katherine. Elena gives John his ring back and asks him about Katherine but John says that he has never talked directly to her, only via Isobel, so he doesn't know anything. He also points out that he hates the fact seeing Elena with a vampire and Elena just leaves the room telling him that his hatred will kill him. Stefan stays behind and threatens John to kill him and turn him into the thing he hates the most, a vampire (he forces him to drink his blood), if he will not leave town and get out of Elena's life within 24 hours.

Katherine arrives at the Mayor's wake and Bonnie walks right over to her. Thinking she is Elena, she tells her about Damon giving his blood to Caroline to heal her but when she touches her she realizes that she is not Elena. She walks away to call Elena but Katherine follows her and introduces herself. Bonnie try to cause her a headache using her powers but Katherine has been around for a long time and Bonnie's spell is too weak yet to work on her. Katherine attacks her and Stefan gets there asking Katherine to let her go and she does.

Stefan and Katherine talk and Stefan wants to know why she is back. The two of them get out of the house and walk away to talk alone just the moment Elena arrives with Jeremy and Jenna. Elena has a talk with Damon about "their" kiss and she says that he is hurt because he thought he kissed her but Damon does not admit it. Jeremy finds Tyler drinking and pays his respects for his father's death. The two of them share some memories of dead parents before Mason walks in and chases Jeremy out. Later, in a moment of grief, Tyler smashes his father's office and when his mother tries to stop him he attacks her. Mason gets there in time to hold him back.

Stefan and Katherine are now away from the house and Stefan still tries to get out of Katherine the reason she is back. She says she is back because of him but Stefan tells her that he was never in love with her since she was compelling him. When he tells her he hates her, she stabs him in the stomach and runs off. Elena finds Stefan and helps him with his wound while asking for Katherine. Damon also arrives and tries to provoke Stefan over his kiss with "Elena" but Stefan, even though he is angry at Damon, he tells him that they have to be united now that Katherine is here and they should not let her drive them apart because that's exactly what she is trying to do.

John is ready to leave and he says goodbye to Jeremy while he tries to explain him that he grew up learning to hate vampires, just like his father did. Jeremy wonders why the ring did not protect his father's life and John explains him that the ring cannot protect you from accidents but only if death comes from a supernatural cause.

Damon gets back home and finds Katherine waiting on the couch. She says she is here to say goodbye but Damon knows she is not leaving before she gets what she wants, something they still try to figure out. Katherine tries to seduce him and they end up kissing. Damon stops just to ask her if she ever loved him and he can forget everything so they can start over but Katherine tells him that she never loved him and it was always Stefan. She leaves, leaving Damon heartbroken.

Damon goes to Elena drunk and sad and he tries to prove to her that she feels something for him but she is in denial. He kisses her against her will and Elena pushes him back telling him that she cares about him but she loves Stefan and it will always be Stefan. Jeremy walks in to defend his sister but Damon, even more hurt, turns to Jeremy. He remembers that Jeremy wanted to be a vampire and knowing that he has Anna's blood in his system, he snaps his neck and leaves, leaving Elena behind crying over Jeremy's body.

Elena sees that Jeremy is wearing his father's ring and she knows that he will come back but she doesn't know if he will come back as a vampire or not. Stefan comes after Damon leaves and he tries to tell her that Damon must have seen the ring that's why he killed Jeremy but Elena is sure that he did not. She now hates him and believes that there is nothing good left in him. Jeremy wakes up and when Stefan checks on him, he says that he is still a human.

The episode ends at the hospital, where Katherine pays a visit to Caroline. Caroline believes that she is Elena but Katherine introduces herself and wants to give a message to Stefan and Damon via Caroline---Game On. Katherine, knowing that Caroline has Damon's blood in her system, smothers Caroline to death with a pillow and leaves after giving Caroline a message to pass to the Salvatore Brothers.

== Feature music ==
In "The Return" we can hear the songs:

- "Wonderful Life" by Hurts
- "Breakeven" by Piano Tribute Players
- "How to Save a Life" by Piano Tribute Players
- "Out of Our Hands" by Gemma Hayes
- "Come Home" by OneRepublic
- "The River Has Run Wild" by Mads Langer

== Reception ==
=== Ratings ===
In its original American broadcast, "The Return" was watched by 3.28 million; down by 0.19 from the previous episode.

=== Reviews ===
"The Return" received positive reviews.

Matt Richenthal from TV Fanatic rated the episode with 4.2/5. "On "The Return," viewers were welcomed back to Mystic Falls with a slow three-quarters of an episode, as the show caught us up on events from the finale, moved pieces and characters around and laid the groundwork for what was to come." Richenthal, praised Somerhalder's acting once again: "We praised Ian Somerhalder's work every week on season one, but it must be highlighted again. [...] ...and, man, did Somerhalder sell his character's pain well."

Josie Kafka of Doux Reviews rated the episode with 3.5/4 saying that it looks like it will be a great season. "The Season Two premiere was top-notch, and set up plenty of meaty, angsty, delicious goodness for the rest of the season."

Diana Steenbergen of IGN rated the episode with 9/10. "This episode was packed from start to finish, complete with more than one shocking twist at the end. If this episode is an indication, we can put aside any fears that the second season of the show will be less fun than the first."

Robin Franson Pruter from Forced Viewing rated the episode with 4/4. "When a series has a phenomenal season finale, it leaves the audience eagerly anticipating the next season’s premiere. The expectations of the viewers are very high. Nearly always, then, the season premiere ends up being a disappointment. [...] The Vampire Diaries‘ accomplishment, then, in creating a season opener that does not merely measure up to the previous season finale but surpasses it, is a prodigious one." Franson Pruter closes her review with: "The Return succeeds because it does more than just resolve the conflicts left over from the season finale; it heightens and builds on those conflicts to begin the narrative of the new season. I would count this episode as one of the best of the series) and certainly among the best season premieres of all time."

Popsugar of Buzzsugar gave a good review to the episode stating: "Even if it wasn't quite as crazy as I had hoped, it's setting the groundwork for what'll surely be a thrilling arc" while Alyse Wax of Fearnet said that the last 10 minutes saved the episode from being a total loss: "The action picked up, those ends began to unravel, and intrigue returned to Mystic Falls. I am officially ready for the season to unspool."

Lucia from Heroine TV also gave a good review to the episode saying: "Overall, I loved “The Return,” and it has raised the stakes for the show. All worries about a decline in season two should be assuaged with this episode, as the episode had me reeling. I had high hopes for Katherine, and was not one bit disappointed. Nina Dobrev's performance was truly impressive. This premiere sets so many things in motion, and it is clear that there will not be a dull moment this year."

Tiffany Vogt of The TV Watchtower gave a good review to the episode saying "It is nearly impossible to spot any flaws in this episode. It was a jaw-dropping adrenaline rush from the second it started and one did not dare exhale until after it was done — and even then, one still felt a bit breathless. [...] This episode tested boundaries — the boundaries of love, of friendship, of abilities. While Damon, Stefan, Elena and Katherine were amidst their self-discoveries, Bonnie too was discovering what her limits were. She discovered she would do anything to save Caroline, including let Damon feed her his blood, and she learned that while she can hurt some vampires, she is not strong enough to tangle with Katherine — yet."

Den of Geek gave a good review to the episode saying that the episode didn't disappoint and that the show knows how to begin with a bang. "Personally, I was pretty impressed with the amount they managed to squeeze in here. I thought that the writing was exceptional, and there were quite a few memorable scenes for us as well. The heart to heart between Damon and Stefan was my favourite. [...] For the most part I was pleased with the premiere of the second season."
