= The Vampire Diaries season 2 =

The Vampire Diaries
- Season 2
- Season 2 DVD cover
- Showrunners: Kevin Williamson; Julie Plec
- Starring: Nina Dobrev; Paul Wesley; Ian Somerhalder; Steven R. McQueen; Sara Canning; Katerina Graham; Candice Accola; Zach Roerig; Michael Trevino; Matt Davis
- No. of episodes: 22

Release
- Original network: The CW
- Original release: September 9, 2010 – May 12, 2011

Season chronology
- ← Previous; Season 1 Next → Season 3

The Vampire Diaries, an American supernatural drama, was officially renewed by The CW for a full 22-episode season on February 16, 2010. The first episode premiered on September 9, 2010, at 8 p.m. ET. The season picks up immediately after the events of the season one finale. All the series regulars returned. The second season focuses on the return of Elena Gilbert's (Nina Dobrev) doppelgänger, Katherine Pierce, the introduction of werewolves, the sun and moon curse, and the arrival of the original vampires. Tyler Lockwood's (Michael Trevino) uncle, Mason Lockwood (Taylor Kinney), arrives in town searching for the moonstone, a family heirloom. Tyler later learns of his family's werewolf curse. Meanwhile, Caroline Forbes (Candice Accola) is killed by Katherine while having Damon Salvatore's (Ian Somerhalder) blood in her system, turning her into a vampire. The arrival of the original vampires, Elijah (Daniel Gillies) and Klaus Mikaelson (Joseph Morgan), also bring about complications. Klaus is a vampire-werewolf hybrid, but his werewolf side had been forced into dormancy by witches, as nature would not stand for such an imbalance in power. Therefore, Klaus arrives in town with plans to break the curse and unleash his werewolf side by channelling the power of the full moon into the moonstone, sacrificing a vampire and a werewolf, and drinking the blood of the doppelgänger. It became available on DVD and Blu-ray on August 30, 2011.

== Cast ==
=== Main ===
- Nina Dobrev as Elena Gilbert / Katherine Pierce
- Paul Wesley as Stefan Salvatore
- Ian Somerhalder as Damon Salvatore
- Steven R. McQueen as Jeremy Gilbert
- Sara Canning as Jenna Sommers
- Kat Graham as Bonnie Bennett
- Candice Accola as Caroline Forbes
- Zach Roerig as Matt Donovan
- Michael Trevino as Tyler Lockwood
- Matt Davis as Alaric Saltzman

=== Recurring ===
- Susan Walters as Carol Lockwood
- Daniel Gillies as Elijah Mikaelson
- Marguerite MacIntyre as Liz Forbes
- Taylor Kinney as Mason Lockwood
- David Anders as John Gilbert
- Bryton James as Luka Martin
- Randy J. Goodwin as Jonas Martin
- Michaela McManus as Jules
- Lauren Cohan as Rose
- Dawn Olivieri as Andie Starr
- Joseph Morgan as Klaus Mikaelson
- Gino Anthony Pesi as Maddox

=== Guest ===
- Tiya Sircar as Aimee Bradley
- Lisa Tucker as Greta Martin
- Trent Ford as Trevor
- Maiara Walsh as Sarah
- Mia Kirshner as Isobel Flemming
- Trevor Peterson as Slater
- B. J. Britt as Carter
- Courtney Ford as Vanessa Monroe
- Simon Miller as George Lockwood
- Natashia Williams as Lucy Bennett
- Bree Condon as Alice
- James Harvey Ward as Cody Webber
- Ahna O'Reilly as Jessica Cohen
- Arielle Kebbel as Lexi Branson
- Bianca Lawson as Emily Bennett (voice only)
- Malese Jow as Anna
- Kayla Ewell as Vicki Donovan (uncredited)

== Episodes ==
No. overall	No. in season	Title	Directed by	Written by	Original release date	Prod. code	U.S. viewers (millions)
23	1	"The Return"	J. Miller Tobin	Kevin Williamson & Julie Plec	September 9, 2010	2J5251	3.28
Picking up where the first season left off, Elena arrives home to discover the fates of Uncle John and Jeremy. Jeremy has not transitioned into a vampire, because he did not take enough drugs to die and Anna's blood overcame the overdose. Damon, Bonnie, and Elena agree that Caroline needs Damon's blood to survive. Damon realizes that Katherine has returned and is impersonating Elena. Tyler is surprised when his uncle, Mason Lockwood, arrives in town to console him. Katherine and Damon nearly sleep together, but Katherine tells Damon, "it will always be Stefan". Distraught, Damon goes to see Elena, who resists his attempt to kiss her. Angry that Elena also loves Stefan, Damon snaps Jeremy's neck. Jeremy survives because he is wearing a Gilbert ring, which protects the wearer from death from supernatural causes. Katherine goes to the hospital and smothers Caroline with a pillow. Before Caroline dies, Katherine gives her a message for the Salvatore brothers: "Game on."
24	2	"Brave New World"	John Dahl	Brian Young	September 16, 2010	2J5252	3.05
Caroline has become a vampire and awakens in the hospital craving blood. Tyler catches Mason searching for a moonstone, which is a family heirloom. At the carnival, Damon compels a boy named Carter to pick a fight with Tyler to provoke one of Tyler's bursts of anger. Mason breaks up the fight using his supernatural abilities, proving that he is a werewolf. Caroline confronts Damon about his abusive treatment, and he realizes that she is a vampire. He alerts Elena and Stefan, while a ravenous Caroline drains Carter. Stefan promises Caroline he will guide her journey as a vampire. Tyler retrieves the moonstone Mason has been seeking. Matt notices Caroline's erratic behavior but admits that he loves her.
25	3	"Bad Moon Rising"	Patrick Norris	Andrew Chambliss	September 23, 2010	2J5253	3.57
Elena, Damon, and Alaric head to Isobel's old office at Duke University, where it is revealed that vampires and werewolves used to roam freely until a shaman uttered a curse to limit their powers, after which the werewolves were servants of the moon and vampires became the slaves of the sun. Stefan teaches Caroline how to control herself and hunt animals. Bonnie makes Caroline a daylight ring so that she will not be burned by the sun. In werewolf form, Mason encounters Stefan and Caroline. Tyler saves them by shouting at the werewolf; he later finds Mason in the woods and realises what has happened. Unable to control herself, Caroline feeds on Matt. She compels him to forget it, but ends their relationship to keep him safe from her. Damon tells Elena Katherine's real name, Katerina Petrova, to aid Elena with her research. Alaric reaffirms his romantic interest in Jenna, and Caroline finds Katherine in her bedroom.
26	4	"Memory Lane"	Rob Hardy	Caroline Dries	September 30, 2010	2J5254	3.18
Katherine tells Stefan that she will kill Elena unless he ends his relationship with her, and as a result, Elena realizes that Caroline is working for Katherine. Elena and Katherine finally meet, but Katherine ignores Elena's questions. Damon stabs Mason with a silver knife, but Mason says it is only a myth that silver hurts werewolves. They are now enemies. Katherine remembers how in 1864, after Stefan and Damon were shot in an attempt to save her, she had kissed Stefan, declaring her love and saying they would be together again one day. Stefan and Elena stage a fake break-up to prevent Katherine from hurting anybody.
27	5	"Kill or Be Killed"	Jeff Woolnough	Mike Daniels	October 7, 2010	2J5255	3.47
At the Mystic Falls picnic, Mason Lockwood tells Sheriff Liz Forbes that Stefan and Damon are vampires. Liz and her fellow police officers shoot Stefan and Damon. Caroline and Elena reach the Salvatore's before Liz can kill them, but Caroline's identity as a vampire is exposed to her mother. Liz rejects Caroline as her daughter, and Stefan drinks Elena's blood to gain strength. Caroline confesses to Elena that Katherine had threatened to kill Matt if Caroline didn't spy on Elena and Stefan for her; Elena forgives Caroline. Jeremy and Tyler start to bond when Tyler learns that Jeremy knows about the curse. Tyler almost kills a girl, feeling for a second that he wants her to die. He then tells Mason that he wants nothing to do with the curse, and gives him the moonstone. It is revealed that Mason is working for Katherine, who wants the moonstone, and that they are lovers.
28	6	"Plan B"	John Behring	Elizabeth Craft & Sarah Fain	October 21, 2010	2J5256	3.62
Liz accepts Caroline, and Caroline compels her mother to forget that she is a vampire. Bonnie incapacitates Mason by giving him an aneurysm. Damon then questions and tortures Mason who, believing that Katherine loves him, refuses to talk. Telling Mason that Katherine is using him, Damon eventually kills him. Bonnie has a vision of the moonstone's location in a well. Stefan discovers that the well is full of vervain, which burns him. Caroline and Bonnie help Elena rescue Stefan and retrieve the moonstone. Katherine compels Jenna to stab herself. Fearful of what else Katherine might do, Elena breaks up with Stefan for good. Needing another werewolf, Katherine compels Matt to attack Tyler, so that Tyler will kill Matt and become a werewolf.
29	7	"Masquerade"	Charles Beeson	Kevin Williamson & Julie Plec	October 28, 2010	2J5257	3.55
Stefan, Damon, Bonnie, Jeremy, Alaric, and Caroline plan to kill Katherine at the Lockwoods' masquerade ball. Katherine is visited by Lucy, a witch who is to help her retrieve the moonstone. Under Katherine's compulsion, Matt fights Tyler. Caroline breaks up the fight, but Sarah, who is also compelled, stabs Tyler, and he accidentally breaks her neck. Tyler's eyes turn yellow, showing that the curse has been triggered. Stefan and Damon try to kill Katherine, but they stop when Jeremy tells them that every time they stake her, Elena is wounded. Katherine reveals that she had Lucy put a spell on Elena and herself, which linked them. Lucy, who is Bonnie's cousin, lifts the spell and incapacitates Katherine, who collapses. Damon traps Katherine in the underground tomb. As Elena heads home she is intercepted by a masked stranger.
30	8	"Rose"	Liz Friedlander	Brian Young	November 4, 2010	2J5258	3.63
A vampire named Trevor takes Elena to an abandoned house, where she meets Rose, another vampire. When Tyler witnesses Caroline's abilities, she reveals that she is a vampire. Elena overhears Rose and Trevor arguing about a vampire named Elijah. Using a spell, Bonnie locates Elena. Elena tries to extract information from Rose, who tells her that Elijah is one of the "original" vampires. Rose and Trevor are using Elena, the Petrova doppelgänger who is the key to breaking the curse, as a bargaining chip. Elijah arrives, and Rose offers him Elena in exchange for their pardon. Elijah agrees but kills Trevor. Elena tries to stall Elijah by saying that she knows where the moonstone is, but he compels her to tell him its location. Stefan and Damon arrive to fight with Elijah and stake him. Elena's vervain necklace remains at the house. Later that night, Damon is in Elena's bedroom with her vervain necklace in his hand. He tells her that he loves her but doesn't deserve her, and that Stefan does. Then he compels her to forget what he said. In the abandoned house, Elijah pulls the wooden stake out of his chest.
31	9	"Katerina"	J. Miller Tobin	Andrew Chambliss	November 11, 2010	2J5259	3.50
In Bulgaria in 1490 Katherine gives birth to a baby girl only to have her father take the baby away. Back in the present, Elena offers Katherine blood for the truth. Elena learns that as a descendant of Katherine, she is a doppelgänger from the Petrova line. Katherine reveals that she became a vampire so that she could not be used to break the curse. Katherine came to Mystic Falls to try to save herself from Klaus by offering him what he needed to lift the curse: the current doppelgänger, a witch, a werewolf, a vampire, and the moonstone. Bonnie meets a warlock named Luka and his father. Damon and Rose seek information about Klaus from Rose's vampire friend, Slater, but a healed Elijah overhears them. Elijah compels Slater to stake himself. It is revealed that Luka and his father are working for Elijah.
32	10	"The Sacrifice"	Ralph Hemecker	Caroline Dries	December 2, 2010	2J5260	3.46
Elena and Rose go to ask Slater about Klaus, but they find his staked corpse. Elena uses information from Slater's computer to get Klaus's attention, saying she wants to surrender. Caroline and Tyler discover Mason's journal and the video diary that he used to document his transformations. Bonnie plans to lift the spell from the tomb and incapacitate Katherine so that Stefan can grab the moonstone, but Jeremy goes ahead with the plan alone and is captured by Katherine, who feeds on him. Stefan saves Jeremy but is trapped himself. Three vampires confront Damon, Rose, and Elena. Elijah kills the three vampires and then departs. Back home, a trapped Stefan makes Damon promise to protect Elena. Elijah informs Luka's father that Damon and Stefan will protect Elena, which is Elijah's goal.
33	11	"By the Light of the Moon"	Elizabeth Allen	Mike Daniels	December 9, 2010	2J5261	3.16
As the full moon approaches, Caroline helps Tyler prepare for his transformation. Stefan asks Katherine to prove that there is good in her, and she advises him to ask Isobel for help in finding Klaus. Bonnie seeks Luka's help to destroy the moonstone; they cast a spell, but Luka gives the moonstone to his father. Jules, a friend of Mason, arrives in Mystic Falls looking for him. Damon and Alaric try to trick her into having a drink mixed with wolfsbane. She reveals that she is a werewolf and tells Damon that he has been marked. Elijah makes a deal with Elena: she has to keep herself safe from Klaus (so that Elijah can use her as bait to kill Klaus) and in return, Elijah will protect her friends and family and free Stefan from the tomb. Caroline reunites with Tyler. At the Salvatore mansion, Jules, in wolf form, tries to attack Damon but instead bites Rose's shoulder, which becomes infected.
34	12	"The Descent"	Marcos Siega	Elizabeth Craft & Sarah Fain	January 27, 2011	2J5262	3.55
Stefan tries to contact Isobel and gets in touch with John Gilbert, who comes home. While Damon tries to get Jules to tell him how to cure the werewolf bite, he asks Elena to keep an eye on Rose, who becomes delirious and mistakes her for Katherine. Caroline and Matt confess their love for each other. Tyler's reaction to Caroline's generosity surprises her. Rose escapes from the Salvatore house and goes on a killing spree. Damon finds her and brings her back to the Salvatore's house, he then stakes her, while giving her a peaceful death by giving her a dream about her old home. He confesses to a stranger that he misses being human. He lets her go, but bites her soon after. Jules informs Tyler that she knows that he and Mason are werewolves. She tells him that more werewolves are coming.
35	13	"Daddy Issues"	Joshua Butler	Kevin Williamson & Julie Plec	February 3, 2011	2J5263	3.22
Tyler is furious that Caroline has kept Mason's death secret from him. Jenna becomes upset over the revelation that John is Elena's biological father. Jules meets her wolf-lover Brady and tells him she wants to leave town and take Tyler with them. Caroline asks Stefan to reason with Tyler, while Jules takes Caroline hostage. Jules tells Stefan to bring Tyler to her in exchange for Caroline. Stefan tries to make peace, but he fails, and Damon offers his "bloodier" method. Jules then calls on her wolf friends, and although Damon and Stefan are outnumbered, they kill most of the wolves. Tyler releases Caroline from the cage, but watches as Jules has Caroline at gunpoint. As Stefan and Damon are about to get staked, Jonas, on Elijah's behalf, incapacitates the remaining wolves. Tyler tries to apologize to Caroline, but she tells him they are no longer friends. Tyler tells Jules and Brady that Mason was probably killed because he found the moonstone. John says that he returned to protect Elena, and that the only way to kill an Original is with a dagger dipped in ash from a white oak as old as the Originals. John is shown to be still working with Katherine and trying to get her out of the tomb.
36	14	"Crying Wolf"	David Von Ancken	Brian Young	February 10, 2011	2J5264	2.78
Stefan and Elena spend a weekend at the Gilbert lakehouse, unaware that they've been followed by Tyler and Brady. Jenna worries that Alaric isn't being honest about his past. Jules and Brady explain the sun and moon curse to Tyler and lure him into helping them. Bonnie performs a hypnosis spell on Luka in order to get information. Luka reveals that Elijah plans to kill Klaus by making him vulnerable after he sacrifices Elena. He also reveals that Klaus has his sister, so he and his father are working for Elijah to help him kill Klaus. Jules and her friends torture Damon for information about the moonstone, but Elijah intervenes, kills most of the wolves, and saves Damon. Brady finds Stefan and shoots him with a wooden bullet, leaving Tyler to guard him. When Tyler learns that Elena has to die for the curse to be broken, he lets Stefan go. Stefan kills Brady to save Elena. Meanwhile, Jeremy and Bonnie confess their feelings for each other and kiss. Realising that Elena knew about Elijah's real plan for her, Stefan tells her that she is behaving like a martyr. Tyler tells Matt that he has feelings for Caroline but knows that Caroline loves Matt. The episode ends with Jules and Tyler leaving town.
37	15	"The Dinner Party"	Marcos Siega	Andrew Chambliss	February 17, 2011	2J5265	3.07
Elena reads one of Jonathan Gilbert's journals about a night when Stefan attacked him and killed two of the Fells. Stefan admits that he had been brutal and inhuman until Lexi showed him the path of love and humanity. Damon invites Elijah to the boarding house for a dinner party, intending to kill him. Jonathan Gilbert's journal reveals that if a vampire uses the dagger to kill an Original, both will die. After Stefan sends a warning, Alaric stabs and kills Elijah, but the body later disappears. Elena reads in the journal that if the dagger is removed, the Original will come back to life. John blackmails Alaric into returning his ring. Elijah shows up at the lake house telling Elena that the deal is off, but Elena threatens to kill herself and become a vampire so that she will no longer be useful to him. Elijah calls her out on a bluff, but Elena stabs herself. Elijah begs Elena to let him heal her, and she agrees, but then stabs him with the dagger, killing him again. Damon returns home to find Katherine there. Elijah's compulsion on her has worn off with his death, and she says she intends to help them.
38	16	"The House Guest"	Michael Katleman	Caroline Dries	February 24, 2011	2J5266	2.98
Discovering that Katherine is free, Elena is upset. Stefan and Bonnie try to persuade Jonas and Luka to work with them, but Jonas wants Elijah alive again. He performs a ritual that puts Luka in the boarding house in invisible form. Luka tries to remove the dagger from Elijah's body, but Katherine stops him. Luka then stakes Katherine, but Damon uses a flamethrower to prevent the removal of the dagger. Luka is fatally burned, and Jonas vows to avenge him by killing Elena. Bonnie tells Elena about her relationship with Jeremy and is surprised by Elena's positive response. Jonas appears at the Grill, looking for Elena. Bonnie tries to stop him, but he disables her; Matt intervenes, but Jonas stabs him. Caroline sees Matt dying and forces him to drink her blood to save his life. Jonas attacks Elena, but she proves to be Katherine, and she bites him. Alaric tells Jenna that he loves her. Bonnie reveals that Jonas has restored her powers and told her how to kill Klaus. Caroline tells Matt that she is a vampire, but he takes the news badly. Isobel shows up at Elena's house and tells Jenna that she is Elena's mother.
39	17	"Know Thy Enemy"	Wendey Stanzler	Mike Daniels	April 7, 2011	2J5267	2.73
Elena and Alaric become angry with John when Isobel's arrival devastates Jenna. Alaric is abducted by Maddox, a warlock from Klaus's inner circle. Meanwhile, Bonnie works with Jeremy and Damon to find the spell they need to gather the power of the witches killed in the massacre. Damon takes them to the site where the witches were burned. Matt demands to know what happened to Vicki. After Caroline tells him and then compels him to forget, it is revealed that Matt's involvement was a setup by Sheriff Forbes to find out everything about the vampires. Matt has drunk vervain, so the compulsion does not work. Isobel kidnaps Elena and then receives a phone call from Maddox, who tells her that she has finished what Klaus compelled her to do and is free to let Elena go. Isobel apologizes to Elena for being a disappointment as a mother, removes her necklace, and burns to death in the sun. Stefan and Damon realize that Bonnie is their new secret weapon since she now has tremendous power. Jeremy is upset because, if Bonnie uses too much power, she will die. Katherine, who had been set up by Isobel and taken by Maddox, wakes up to see Klaus take control of Alaric's body.
40	18	"The Last Dance"	John Behring	Michael Narducci	April 14, 2011	2J5268	2.81
Klaus (in Alaric's body) compels Katherine to tell him how the others plan to kill him. He then finds out that Bonnie has obtained power that could threaten his life. At the school dance, Jeremy confronts Bonnie about why she wants to kill herself for Elena, and Damon overhears. Jeremy goes to Stefan for help, and Stefan tells Elena about Bonnie's plans. Elena finally guesses who "Alaric" really is. Bonnie fights Klaus with her powers and appears to die. As Elena grieves, Damon tells her that Klaus must believe Bonnie is dead, but her death was faked. Realizing that Bonnie intends to endanger herself to defeat Klaus, Elena pulls the dagger out of Elijah's heart.
41	19	"Klaus"	Joshua Butler	Kevin Williamson & Julie Plec	April 21, 2011	2J5269	2.70
After Elena removed the dagger, Elijah wakes, and Elena makes another deal with him. In a flashback to 1492 England, Katherine meets Elijah and Klaus for the first time. Elijah and Klaus were raised as brothers, but Klaus was the result of their mother's affair with a man from a werewolf bloodline. Elijah's father hunted down the man and had him and his family killed, beginning the schism between werewolves and vampires. As a vampire/werewolf hybrid, Klaus can only be killed by a witch. The sun and moon curse was fake – the real curse is that Klaus's werewolf side had been forced into dormancy by witches. Jenna finally finds out about the vampires from Stefan and Klaus/Alaric. Elsewhere, Katherine is being held captive by Klaus. Damon finds her and gives her a vial of vervain to protect her from further compulsion. At the end of the episode, Maddox and Greta (Luka's sister) perform a ritual to release Klaus's spirit from Alaric's body and put it back into his own.
42	20	"The Last Day"	J. Miller Tobin	Andrew Chambliss & Brian Young	April 28, 2011	2J5270	2.68
Elijah tells Elena that the way to break the curse involves sacrificing a vampire and a werewolf. Maddox injures Carol Lockwood to make Tyler return to town, after which he and Greta kidnap Caroline and Tyler. Damon forces Elena to drink his blood so she will "survive" the sacrifice. Alaric returns as himself and gives the message from Klaus that the ritual will happen that night. Jenna forgives him. Damon realizes that if Klaus doesn't have a werewolf, he will be unable to complete the ritual, and Elena will have another month. He rescues Caroline and Tyler from the tomb and kills Maddox. Klaus takes Elena from the boarding house to begin the ritual. Damon informs Klaus that he has rescued the vampire and werewolf he needs for the ritual, but Klaus says he has backups. At the site of the ritual, Elena realizes that Klaus has turned Jenna and is using her as the vampire. Katherine makes Damon aware of a wolf bite he got from Tyler during his transformation.
43	21	"The Sun Also Rises"	Paul M. Sommers	Caroline Dries & Mike Daniels	May 5, 2011	2J5271	2.84
Matt and Caroline are in the Lockwood cellar while Tyler, in wolf form, attacks them, and they hide. Meanwhile, Greta the witch feeds Jenna her blood, completing Jenna's transformation into a vampire. Elijah is revealed to be seeking revenge on Klaus for killing his family and burying their bodies at sea. Klaus begins the ritual and kills Jules, the werewolf. Stefan offers to switch places with Jenna, but Klaus refuses and kills her. Bonnie performs a spell that can bring someone back to life by joining two people's souls, binding John and Elena. At the ritual grounds, Klaus drains Elena's blood and begins to transform. However, Bonnie uses her powers to weaken him while Damon kills Greta. Before Elijah can rip out his heart, Klaus says he didn't bury the bodies at sea and if he is killed, Elijah will never find them. Elijah listens to him and flees with Klaus. When Elena comes back to life, John dies. At Jenna's and John's funeral, Damon reveals to Stefan that he was bitten by Tyler and asks him to not tell Elena.
44	22	"As I Lay Dying"	John Behring	Turi Meyer & Al Septien & Michael Narducci	May 12, 2011	2J5272	2.86
Two days later, Damon apologizes to Elena for feeding her his blood. He then tries to kill himself by taking off his ring and walking into the sunlight but is stopped by Stefan. When Klaus awakens after successfully transforming into a wolf, he honors the deal with Elijah to reunite him with his family - by staking Elijah. Klaus shows Stefan the cure for a werewolf bite is his blood (Note: Klaus' blood is not the only cure to a werewolf bite, as seen on episode 22 of season 6 when Kai Parker siphoned off Tyler Lockwood's werewolf bite magic-toxin. Special Gemini witches, specifically siphon witches can use their siphoning abilities to their advantage to siphon off werewolf magic from the toxin and neutralise it, thus healing a werewolf bite.) by biting Katherine and feeding her his blood. Klaus tells Stefan he will trade a vial of his blood if Stefan becomes a ripper again and leaves Mystic Falls with him. After Stefan drinks human blood, Klaus gives Katherine the cure for Damon. Sheriff Forbes, trying to kill Damon, accidentally frees him from his cell. She tracks Damon down but she misses her shot and kills Jeremy instead. Bonnie begs the witches to bring Jeremy back saying that she loves him. They do but warn of "consequences." Elena finds a delirious Damon, brings him home, and kisses him after he confesses his love. Katherine interrupts with Klaus's cure for the werewolf bite. Klaus tests Stefan, asking him to kill someone. Jeremy finds Anna and Vicki at the Gilbert home, both dead vampires.

== Production ==
On February 16, 2010, The CW officially renewed The Vampire Diaries for a full 22-episode second season. It premiered on Thursday September 9, 2010, at 8 pm ET. The season finale aired on May 12, 2011.

=== Casting ===
On July 9, 2010, Entertainment Weekly announced Taylor Kinney would join the cast in a recurring role as Tyler's uncle Mason, a werewolf who comes to town after his brother dies. Katherine sends Mason to Mystic Falls to get the moonstone for her. He succeeds, but Damon and Stefan find out that he works with Katherine, and Damon kills him. Mason has been described as a "cool" uncle, sexy and athletic. Lauren Cohan joined the cast as Rose, a 500-year-old vampire and possible love interest for Damon. She kidnaps Elena to hand her over to Elijah, but Elena is saved by Stefan and Damon. She then becomes their ally and even starts a small romantic relationship with Damon. She dies after being bitten by werewolf Jules.

Michaela McManus joined the cast in a guest role as a werewolf who comes to town looking for answers about Mason's death. She helps Tyler deal with the discovery that he is a werewolf, but is later killed during the sacrifice. Bryton James portrays warlock Luka Martin in season two. He befriends Bonnie, but it is later revealed that he and his father work for Elijah. When he tries to save Elijah invisibly, Damon burns him to death. His father Jonas Martin, played by Randy J. Goodwin in season two, is introduced as a friend of Elijah. He is a warlock who, in order to save his daughter Greta, is willing and able to help defeat Klaus. He is later killed by Katherine, who is protecting the Salvatore brothers.

Gino Anthony Pesi portrays Maddox at the end of season two, a warlock who works for Klaus. Matt shoots him to death when he tries to overcome Damon. On February 18, 2011, it was announced that British actor Joseph Morgan had signed on to play original vampire Klaus.

== Storylines ==
The second season focuses mainly on the arrival of Elena's doppelgänger Katherine Pierce and on her reasons for returning to Mystic Falls. It also introduces werewolves. Tyler's werewolf uncle, Mason Lockwood, arrives after the death of Tyler's father and tells Tyler about the so-called "Lockwood curse" in their family. To activate the werewolf gene, the person must kill someone. Katherine turns Caroline into a vampire, so as to have a spy against Stefan and Elena. Katherine's main reason for returning to Mystic Falls is to find the moonstone, with the help of Mason, who is killed by Damon. Katherine calls in a favor from a witch named Lucy to get the stone. Lucy casts a spell so that when Katherine is hurt, it also affects Elena.

When Lucy finds out that another Bennett is at the party and that Katherine had deceived her, she puts a spell on the moonstone, injuring Katherine. Damon then leaves her in the original tomb where she is trapped until the spell has been removed from the tomb. She tells him that her reason for not killing Elena is that she is in danger. Elena is later kidnapped by a masked individual and held hostage by vampires Rose and Trevor, who have been on the run from the Originals (the first generation of vampires). Rose reveals to Elena that she is the Petrova doppelgänger and needs to be sacrificed to break the sun and moon curse. Katherine was also a Petrova doppelgänger, who used Trevor to help her escape from the Originals and Rose to turn her into a vampire to save herself. Elena is rescued by Stefan and Damon by stabbing Elijah with a sharp wooden pole and they escape.

Klaus, one of the original vampires, arrives and is now hunting Elena. His brother Elijah has made a deal with Elena to protect her loved ones, because he wants to use her as bait to lure Klaus and kill him. Jules, a friend of Mason, tells the Lockwoods that Mason never came back to Florida and is missing. Alaric is suspicious of Jules and calls Damon to the Grill (local town hangout). Jules reveals that she is a werewolf. Damon tells Jules she won't find Mason and to leave town. Jules breaks into the Salvatore mansion in wolf form and attacks Damon, but Rose pushes him out of the way, getting bitten on the shoulder instead (werewolf bites are lethal to vampires). As Rose succumbs to the effects of the bite, Damon stakes her in a glorious dream they share, giving her a peaceful death.

Uncle John returns to Mystic Falls and comes as an unpleasant surprise to Elena, Damon, Jenna, and Alaric. John reveals to Damon that the only way to kill an Original is with a dagger dipped in white ash wood. A boy named Luka settle in the town with his father (they are both warlocks) and reveals that they are working for Elijah because Klaus has his sister Greta and they want him (Luka) dead as well. Luka becomes friends with Bonnie and tells her that Klaus will be weakened by the sacrificial ritual, meaning that Elena has to die so that Elijah can kill him and free his sister. John gives Damon the special dagger to kill Elijah.

Elena finds out that if a vampire uses the dagger, that vampire will die. Stefan warns Damon and Alaric stabs Elijah, but he pulls the dagger out and tells Elena their deal is off. Elena stabs herself in the stomach, and Elijah begs her to let him heal her. She stabs him with the dagger and leaves it in him. Elijah's death means that Katherine is no longer compelled to stay in the tomb. She helps kill the Martin witches. When Isobel returns to town, Katherine double-crosses the Salvatores by kidnapping Elena and stealing the moonstone for Klaus in exchange for her freedom. But it is revealed that Klaus wanted Katherine and compelled Isobel to get her and the moonstone.

Klaus enters Alaric's body and compels Katherine to stay in Alaric's house. Bonnie and Jeremy find the site of the a witch massacre and Bonnie channels all the power. Alaric/Klaus blends with Stefan, Damon, and Elena and finds out that Bonnie has her powers. Damon tells Bonnie to put on a protection spell and make Alaric/Klaus believe that she is dead. Elena does not want Bonnie to die, so she pulls the dagger out of Elijah's heart. After Elijah comes to life, Elena learns the full history of Klaus. The Aztec curse is fake and there is a curse on Klaus, as he is a vampire born in a werewolf bloodline. There is a ritual that involves killing a vampire and a werewolf and a Petrova doppelganger, that will unearth the werewolf side of Klaus making him a hybrid.

Elena realizes that the real curse is on Klaus, who therefore wants to kill her. But Elijah says he has an elixir that can save Elena from dying. Elena believes Elijah, but Damon says that there is another way to save her life and feeds her his blood. Stefan tries to stop him, but he stabs in the chest with the wooden dagger. Elena then cries that she will be a vampire against her will. Maddox kidnaps Tyler and Caroline. Damon frees them and is bitten. Then he goes to Klaus to tell him that he does not have a werewolf and witch, as he killed Maddox. Klaus says that he has backups. Klaus takes Elena from Stefan. Elena sees Jenna, who thinks she is dead, but Greta tells her she is transitioning. Damon asks Katherine about the vampire, and she says that Jenna is the backup vampire. He then checks his arm and sees that Tyler has bitten him.

In the season's finale, Klaus is working on the ritual out in the woods and is near completion when he is about to kill Elena, but Stefan tries to work a deal with him. Klaus agrees to have Stefan work for him in exchange for Damon's protection. Elena is "killed" in the ritual but is shown to have survived. Regardless, Klaus's werewolf side is unleashed and he becomes the first hybrid, half vampire half werewolf. Bonnie arrives and subdues Klaus with her powers, giving Elijah the opportunity to strike, but Klaus talks him down offering to help find their siblings. Elena's survival is revealed as John had Bonnie cast a spell that had him die in Elena's place. The next morning John succumbs and dies. At his funeral, Elena reads a note from John saying he will always love her and she will always be his daughter, even if she becomes a vampire. Damon also shows where he was bitten and walks away.

== Reception ==
=== Critical response ===
Based on 12 reviews, the second season currently holds a 100% on Rotten Tomatoes with an average rating of 8.07 out of 10. The site's critics consensus reads, "The sophomore season of Vampire Diaries is top shelf guilty pleasure, balancing wild twists and cliffhangers without going off the rails."

Ken Tucker of Entertainment Weekly wrote, "The throbbing red heart of The Vampire Diaries remains the tension between Damon and Paul Wesley's Stefan, and their mutual attraction to whomever Dobrev is embodying at the time." Mark A. Perigard of the Boston Herald said, "The triangle – quadrangle? – becomes more twisted by episode's end. It leads to shocking violence against outsiders that deepens the tragedy and the mythology at the core of the show. "Game on" just might be the two most chilling words uttered this season." Matt Roush of TV Guide commented, "The Vampire Diaries is the sort of show where 'never say die' is written into the mythology – a good thing for several of the opening hour's apparent victims. I don't know how much longer The Vampire Diaries can keep churning stories at this feverish rate, but if this is your sort of guilty pleasure, you'd be crazy not to bite."

=== Ratings ===
No.	Title	Air date	18–49 rating (Live + SD)	Viewers (millions) increase	Total 18-49 increase	Total viewers (millions)	Ref
02	"Brave New World"	September 16, 2010	1.4	0.91	1.9	3.96	
03	"Bad Moon Rising"	September 23, 2010	1.4	0.92	1.9	4.49	
04	"Memory Lane"	September 30, 2010	1.2	0.95	1.8	4.13	
06	"Plan B"	October 21, 2010	1.7	1.04	2.2	4.66	
07	"Masquerade"	October 28, 2010	1.7	0.85	2.2	4.40	
08	"Rose"	November 4, 2010	1.6	1.12	2.1	4.75	
09	"Katerina"	November 11, 2010	1.6	1.01	2.0	4.51	
10	"The Sacrifice"	December 2, 2010	1.6	1.07	2.1	4.53	
11	"By the Light of the Moon"	December 9, 2010	1.3	0.97	1.7	4.13	
12	"The Descent"	January 27, 2011	1.6	1.10	2.1	4.65	
16	"The House Guest"	February 24, 2011	1.3	1.13	1.8	4.11	
17	"Know Thy Enemy"	April 7, 2011	1.2	1.14	1.7	3.87	
18	"The Last Dance"	April 14, 2011	1.3	1.06	1.8	3.87	
19	"Klaus"	April 21, 2011	1.2	1.35	1.8	4.05	
20	"The Last Day"	April 28, 2011	1.2	1.34	1.8	4.02	
21	"The Sun Also Rises"	May 5, 2011	1.3	1.07	1.8	3.91	
22	"As I Lay Dying"	May 12, 2011	1.4	1.02	1.9	3.88	

=== Accolades ===
For its second season The Vampire Diaries won five Teen Choice Awards, one People's Choice Award, and a nomination in Saturn Awards.

== Home media ==
The Vampire Diaries Season 2 was made available on DVD and Blu-ray on August 30, 2011. In region B, it was released on August 22, 2011.
