= Kill or Be Killed (The Vampire Diaries) =

- The Vampire Diaries episode
- Episode no.: Season 2 Episode 5
- Directed by: Jeff Woolnough
- Written by: Mike Daniels
- Cinematography by: Paul M. Sommers
- Editing by: Nicholas Erasmus
- Production code: 2J5255
- Original air date: October 7, 2010

Guest appearances
- Marguerite MacIntyre as Liz Forbes; Taylor Kinney as Mason Lockwood; Tiya Sircar as Aimee Bradley; Maiara Walsh as Sarah

Episode chronology
← Previous "Memory Lane"	Next → "Plan B"
- The Vampire Diaries season 2

"Kill or Be Killed" is the fifth episode of the second season of the American supernatural teen drama television series The Vampire Diaries, and the twenty-seventh of the series. It aired on The CW on October 7, 2010. The episode was written by co-producer Mike Daniels and directed by Jeff Woolnough.

== Plot ==
The episode starts with a flashback from a year ago where Mason (Taylor Kinney) is at a bar and when he leaves, a man named Jimmy follows him. Jimmy accuses Mason of hitting on his girlfriend and the two of them start to fight. During the fight, Jimmy hits his head and dies and Mason has triggered the werewolf curse. Back to the present, Mason warns Tyler (Michael Trevino) that any death that comes from his hands, even if it's an accident, it will trigger the curse and he has to be careful. Mason asks for the moonstone now that he told Tyler everything and Tyler takes him to his father's secret safe but the moonstone is not there. Tyler does not tell Mason that he already found it.

Elena (Nina Dobrev) tells Jeremy (Steven R. McQueen) about the Lockwoods because she promised not to hide anything from him anymore but she asks him to not get involved. When Jeremy leaves, Stefan (Paul Wesley) appears in Elena's room and they plan their fight of the day so Katherine keeps believing that they are not together.

Liz (Marguerite MacIntyre) gets ready for the Mystic Falls' Historical Society Volunteer Day and wants to spend some time with Caroline (Candice Accola). Liz senses that there is something different about Caroline the past few days but Caroline says she is fine and leaves.

Stefan approaches Mason to apologize on Damon's (Ian Somerhalder) behalf for trying to kill him and to offer a truce, but Mason declines. Stefan insists and "threatens" Mason, who finally shakes hands with Stefan. Damon rejoins Stefan to ask what he was doing with Mason and says that despite the truce, Damon still wants to kill him. Stefan also admits that he does not trust Mason and that he will try to kill them in the first chance he gets. Meanwhile, Mason wants to expose the Salvatore brothers and he tells Liz about them. Liz does not believe him and Mason offers to prove it to her.

In the meantime, Jeremy is at the Grill and sees Tyler from afar. He approaches him and they start to talk when Aimee (Tiya Sircar) and Sarah (Maiara Walsh) rejoin them. Tyler wants to relax a little from everything that is happening, so he invites all three of them at his house to have some drinks. At the house, the girls want to see Jeremy's drawings and Tyler gets upset when he sees that Jeremy draws wolves. He asks him to go with him at the office to show him something and when they are alone he demands to know why he keeps drawing wolves. Jeremy admits to him that he knows what he is and Tyler tells him about the curse and the moonstone that his uncle is desperately looking for. The two of them get interrupted by the girls and Sarah takes the moonstone. Tyler tries to get it back and as they "fight", Sarah falls down the stairs. Tyler looks horrified thinking that he has killed her and triggered the curse when Sarah wakes up.

Back at the park, Elena and Stefan pretend to have another fight so that Caroline can report to Katherine. Meanwhile, Liz watches Damon from afar as he is drinking a lemonade that is full of vervain and he chokes, knowing now that Mason was telling the truth. She frantically calls the Council to arrange an ambush for the Salvatore brothers but Caroline sees her from afar leaving the park and she confronts her for leaving "their" day once more for work.

Stefan and Damon decide to kill Mason and they follow him to the woods, without knowing that it's a trap. Liz arrives with two deputies and shoot them in the chest. They carry them down to the old Lockwood slave quarters where Liz asks Mason to leave because he is not part of the Council and he can't be there after she promises that she will kill the Salvatores. On his way out, he runs into Elena and Caroline who are tracking down Damon and Stefan. He threatens to kill Elena but Caroline manages to knock him out so, the two of them leave to get to Stefan and Damon.

Caroline and Elena get at the entrance of the crypt when Caroline stops realizing that if she gets in to save the Salvatores, her mother will find out that she is a vampire. Elena gets in and tells Liz that she can't kill them when Caroline changes her mind and comes to help. She bites the two deputies while Liz is watching in shock. Damon feeds on the deputies and get his strength back, Stefan refuses to drink human blood and Liz sits in silence. Caroline begs her to keep their secret otherwise Damon will kill her. Liz asks to be killed but Damon does not do it because she is his friend and they take her at the Salvatore house to lock her at the basement till her system is vervain-free and they will be able to compel her.

Meanwhile, Stefan gets to Damon's blood bag stash and when Elena asks him what he is doing, he explains that if he drinks human blood in small doses he might be able to control it. His diet makes him weak and despite the fact that he could die earlier, he also cannot protect Elena from Katherine. Elena is horrified by his words and leaves to find Caroline. Caroline confesses to Elena that Katherine made her spy on her and Stefan and report back to her, otherwise she would kill Matt (Zach Roerig). Caroline falls asleep and Elena, on her way out, runs into Damon who tells her that Stefan did not drink the human blood.

Elena gets back inside and goes to Stefan telling him that if he wants to try again on human blood, she wants to be there for him. She cuts her hand offering him her blood and Stefan drinks a few drops hungrily before they kiss.

Mason gets back home and tries to contact Liz to ask her if everything is fine when Tyler gets in and confesses him that he almost killed someone earlier. Tyler says that his wolf nature wished for a moment that Sarah had died and because he does not want to feel that again, he gives him the moonstone.

The episode ends with Mason meeting Katherine at her car in the woods. Another flashback takes us back to when Mason killed Jimmy and Katherine appears to console him. Her look when he hugs her reveals that she was behind everything and she was the one who made Jimmy attack Mason so Mason would kill him and trigger the curse. Back in the present, Mason gives the moonstone to Katherine and they start kissing.

== Feature music ==
In "Kill or Be Killed" we can hear the songs:

- "Yeah Yeah Yeah" by New Politics
- "I Need to Know" by Kris Allen
- "Obsession" by Sky Ferreira
- "The Fellowship" by The Smashing Pumpkins
- "Counting Sleep" by Trent Dabbs
- "Superhuman Touch" by Athlete
- "Sometimes" by The Rifles
- "Cool Kids" by Fast Romantics
- "Punching in a Dream" by The Naked and Famous
- "Steady Love" by Title Tracks
- "Colors" by The Pass

== Reception ==
=== Ratings ===
In its original American broadcast, "Kill or Be Killed" was watched by 3.47 million; up by 0.29 from the previous episode.

=== Reviews ===
"Kill or Be Killed" received positive reviews.

Emma Fraser of TV Overmind gave an A+ rate to the episode saying that it deserves a hearty round of applause for such excellent story telling. "Tyler in the end gives up the moonstone to Mason and despite not finding out what it does, finding out who wanted it was a shocking and unexpected twist; Katherine! It really shouldn't be that shocking considering that we know that Katherine is capable of anything and was the one who gave up the stone back in 1864. What she wants with it is unknown but to see that she is romantically entangled with Mason and was the one who provoked the bar fight that led to Mason's transformation was a surprising and welcome move."

Robin Franson Pruter from Forced Viewing rated the episode with 4/4 saying that it was a satisfying episode that successfully blended the story action and character interaction. "Although this episode is relatively free of major plot developments—no one dies, for instance—events are still moving quickly through the episodes. The rapid pace of the plot, however, doesn't create the sense that the story is rushed, because of episodes like this one, which, as a whole, successfully balances action with emotional conflict. It moves the plot while focusing on the characters and their relationships."

Matt Richenthal of TV Fanatic rated the episode with 4.9/5 saying that he didn't see coming Katherine being involved with Mason. "Throughout the episode, I was impressed by how the show had depicted Mason as neither good nor evil. Even when he plotted to help kill Stefan and Damon, it was out of self defense, not pure malevolence. But now there's no doubt about what side he's on."

Reagan from The TV Chick gave an A− rate to the episode saying that it was another excellent one while Meg from Two Cents TV also gives a good review to the episode saying that the show isn't afraid to break with tradition or spill some secrets; "With "Kill Or Be Killed," the show deftly sidesteps some clichés and hands us an episode of fun, twisty reveals."

Diana Steenbergen from IGN rated the episode with 8.5/10 saying: "The twist ending this episode is completely unexpected as we learn that the two storylines of Mason looking for the moonstone and Katherine returning to Mystic Falls are connected. There was a hint of this last week when we saw Katherine in a flashback with the moonstone, but the revelation that she is pulling the strings on Mason is a surprise, and a good one. Devious as she is, we see that she was even the reason behind him becoming a werewolf."

Josie Kafka of Doux Reviews rated the episode with 3.5/4 saying that the episode was about friendships and about the ending she wrote: "I figured out that the guy who tried to beat up Mason was acting under compulsion as it was happening, and it was just a short logical leap to suspecting Katherine was behind it. I didn't expect that she was looking for the moonstone, though."

Shannon Vestal from Buzzsugar gave a good review to the episode saying that Caroline and Mason had the spotlight on them this week and they each do a lot with their time.
