= Founder's Day =

Founder's Day, Founders Day, or Founders' Day and variations may refer to:

- Founder's Day (Rome), better known as the Parilia, a festival in ancient Rome eventually taken to honor the city's founding
- Founders' Day (Ghana), a public holiday in Ghana
- Founder's Day (Music Festival) an annual campus festival at Vassar College
- Founders' Day (Scouting), a Scouting commemoration associated with Scouts' Day
- Founders Day (South Africa), an observance and former public holiday in South Africa
- "Founder's Day" (The Vampire Diaries), a 2010 episode of the TV series The Vampire Diaries
- Founders Day, a 2023 American slasher film directed by Erik Bloomquist.
- Founders' Day, a former public holiday in Rhodesia
- Founder's Day, a holiday of the American Revolution
- Founder's Day, an annual event at many Indian private boarding schools, such as The Doon School
