= Memory Lane (The Vampire Diaries) =

- The Vampire Diaries episode
- Episode no.: Season 2 Episode 4
- Directed by: Rob Hardy
- Written by: Caroline Dries
- Cinematography by: Paul M. Sommers
- Production code: 2J5254
- Original air date: September 30, 2010

Guest appearances
- Taylor Kinney as Mason Lockwood; Simon Miller as George Lockwood

Episode chronology
← Previous "Bad Moon Rising"	Next → "Kill or Be Killed"
- The Vampire Diaries season 2

"Memory Lane" is the fourth episode of the second season of the American supernatural teen drama television series The Vampire Diaries, and the twenty-sixth of the series. It aired on The CW on September 30, 2010. The episode was written by supervising producer Caroline Dries and directed by Rob Hardy.

== Plot ==
The episode starts with a scene from 1864 where Katherine (Nina Dobrev) and Stefan (Paul Wesley) dance at the Founder's party. While they are dancing, Stefan sees that Damon (Ian Somerhalder) talks with Elena and they leave together. He runs after them and the scene jumps to the present where Elena is now playing pool with Damon. Katherine appears to tell him that now he knows how she feels watching him with Elena. Stefan wakes up with "Elena" lying next to him but he jumps up when he realizes that it is Katherine and she got into his dream.

Damon tries to find a way to prove that Mason (Taylor Kinney) is a werewolf and tells Alaric (Matt Davis) to tell Jenna (Sara Canning) to hold a barbecue party and invite Mason. At the barbecue, Damon plans to stab Mason with a silver knife since according to the stories, silver can harm werewolves. Mason is ready to leave for the barbecue when Tyler (Michael Trevino) asks him to tell him about werewolves. Mason does not want to tell him because he believes there is no need for him to know and he leaves.

Stefan tries to find out from Katherine why she is in Mystic Falls and Katherine says that she is back for him. Stefan does not believe her and to make her tell him the real reason, he injects her with vervain and chains her at the basement. Katherine tells him that she loves him and she knows that he loves her too but Stefan believes that his love was forced after compulsion even though Katherine denies that she ever compelled him. She narrates him what happened back in 1864, the day humans captured her and what led to that day.

1864: George Lockwood (Simon Miller) arrives in Mystic Falls and Katherine knows that he is a werewolf and the one who told the other Founders about vampires. To protect herself, she asks for his help to fake her own death, otherwise she'll reveal his secret. George agrees to do it and also asks something in return, something that Katherine does not reveal to Stefan. After the Founder's party, Stefan escorts Katherine to her room and confesses his love to her. Katherine seems surprised and moved and when Stefan leaves, she goes into her room. Damon waits for her there but Katherine compels him to leave her alone because she is tired.

Katherine arranges the details for the staging of her death with George. He would be the one to take her out of the church and escape, before they burn them alive, and that is what happened. Katherine did not want Stefan and Damon to save her. In the present day, Stefan is furious with her and how she could kill 26 other vampires, who were also her friends, to just save herself and for the fact that he and Damon died for nothing. Katherine reassures him that they did not die for nothing but for love.

Present day: Stefan asks Katherine one more time why she is back in Mystic Falls, but she keeps saying that she is back for him. She threatens that if he will not break up with Elena, then she will kill her. Stefan attempts to stake her but he stops.

Back at the barbeque, Caroline (Candice Accola) talks to Elena and tries to convince her not to worry about Stefan and that everything is fine. Elena though is worried since she has been calling him all day and he has not called her back. Meanwhile, Damon talks using wolf/dog innuendos all the time to see Mason's reaction. Mason understands that Damon knows about him - he was aware that he knew before the barbeque - and when they are alone he tells Damon that he does not want to hurt him and that he is not in Mystic Falls to cause trouble. Mason reassures him that they are not enemies and wants to be friends. The two men shake hands to put aside the rivalry that existed between their ancestors and to make a new start.

The barbeque ends and Elena leaves with Caroline, despite her friend's efforts to convince her not to, for Stefan's home. Caroline damages the tire of the car before they leave and on their way there, they have to pull aside. Caroline does everything she can to prevent Elena from getting to Stefan and that makes Elena realize that something is wrong. Elena eventually gets to the Salvatore house and she meets, for the first time, Katherine, who had managed to unchain herself and hearing Elena, staked Stefan in the leg.

Meanwhile, Damon follows Mason after the barbeque and stabs him with a silver knife. It is revealed that silver doesn't affect the werewolves and that it was just a myth. Mason removes the knife and tells Damon that now he has an enemy, before he gets into the house. Tyler sits there waiting for him and starts asking him again about werewolves. To make Mason tell him about them, he says that he might know where the moonstone, that Mason is looking for since the day he came back, is. The two men start arguing and Mason reveals the curse to Tyler and tells him that to trigger it he has to kill someone; then he will become a werewolf.

Stefan and Elena go to the Grill and run into Caroline who apologizes to Elena for her earlier behaviour. Elena reassures her that everything is fine and she sits with Stefan and talk about their relationship. They end up breaking up and Elena leaves. Caroline hears the whole conversation between them, as does Damon who sits at the bar. Later, Stefan gets into Elena's bedroom and it is revealed that the breakup was fake so that Caroline would inform Katherine about it. Elena figured out that Caroline's behavior was weird because Katherine asked her to keep Elena away from Stefan that day and they wanted to make sure that Katherine believes she and Stefan were done.

The episode ends with a last flashback where Katherine gets out of the church and gives George the moonstone he had asked for in return for helping her. Before she leaves in the carriage that awaits for her, she runs to dead Stefan - after he was shot in his attempt to free her - and tells him that she loves him and they will be together again, while she ignores Damon completely who is lying right next to Stefan.

== Feature music ==
In "Memory Lane" we can hear the songs:

- "Breathe Again" by Sara Bareilles
- "Time of our Lives" by Tyrone Wells
- "Together Faraway" by Ballas Hough Band
- "We Radiate" by Goldfrapp
- "Rock On" by Collide
- "Hammock" by Howls
- "(Quartet for Strings in C Major) Emperor" by Joseph Haydn

== Reception ==
=== Ratings ===
In its original American broadcast, "Memory Lane" was watched by 3.18 million; down by 0.39 from the previous episode.

=== Reviews ===
"Memory Lane" received positive reviews.

Josie Kafka of Doux Reviews rated the episode with 4/4 saying: "I think “Memory Lane” was possibly the most artfully constructed episode of television I have seen in a long, long time. [...] A beautiful structural symmetry permeated every scene, as did allusions to past episodes and intimations of future twists. If it weren't so damn interesting, too, I could write about the interlocking parallels for ages."

E. Reagan from The TV Chick said that the episode was excellent and her favorite episode of the season so far. "Seriously loved this episode. It gets an A from me. I love how they’re developing Katherine’s character because she is legit badass. However, she really loves Stefan. [...] I can’t wait to see where they are going to take the whole Katherine/Elena thing."

Matt Richenthal of TV Fanatic rated the episode with 4/5 saying: "Overall, a somewhat slow episode that gave us more background into Katherine and moved certain pieces into place. It's Stefan/Elena vs. Katherine/Caroline, with Damon caught in between, and a newly-angered werewolf stewing on the sidelines. Call it a game of cat-and-mouse, or just call it the set stage for whatever The Vampire Diaries has in store next week. We can't wait to find out."

Diana Steenbergen from IGN rated the episode with 7.5/10 saying that Nina Dobrev once again did an excellent job shifting back and forth between the characters (Elena/Katherine). "What I like best about Dobrev's performance is that she is able to be menacing. Katherine's threat to Stefan that she will attack Elena's friends and family, and then Elena herself, is convincing enough that Stefan should have killed her right then and there."

Robin Franson Pruter of Forced Viewing rated the episode with 3/4 saying that it was a solid, character-focused episode that revealed Katherine's version of past events. "I’ve always maintained that The Vampire Diaries is, overall, a well-written show. Yes, it has its flaws, but, on the whole, I’ve found the writing above average. This episode challenges me to consider just how sophisticated the writing is. [...] Overall, however we interpret Katherine’s narrative, "Memory Lane" depicts the greatest strengths of the show—the rich complexity of its characters and the Byzantine relationships between them."

The reviewer of Den of Geek gave a good review to the episode saying: "All in all, tonight's episode provided us with further insight into the mind of Katherine and the lengths that she will go to get what she wants. The question is, are our characters prepared to deal with a ruthless Katherine? Things in Mystic Falls are becoming more and more interesting. I find myself being taken along on a captivating, emotional roller coaster."

Popsugar from Buzzsugar gave a good review to the episode saying that it was satisfying. "Between all of the flashbacks, sexual tension, and one tricky twist I didn't see coming, it's an incredibly satisfying episode."
