= Masquerade (The Vampire Diaries) =

- The Vampire Diaries episode
- Episode no.: Season 2 Episode 7
- Directed by: Charles Beeson
- Written by: Kevin Williamson; Julie Plec
- Cinematography by: Paul M. Sommers
- Editing by: Joshua Butler
- Production code: 2J5257
- Original air date: October 28, 2010

Guest appearances
- Natashia Williams as Lucy; Tiya Sircar as Aimee Bradley; Maiara Walsh as Sarah

Episode chronology
← Previous "Plan B"	Next → "Rose"
- The Vampire Diaries season 2

"Masquerade" is the seventh episode of the second season of the American supernatural teen drama television series The Vampire Diaries, and the twenty-ninth of the series. It aired on The CW on October 28, 2010. The episode was written by series developers Kevin Williamson and Julie Plec, and directed by Charles Beeson.

== Plot ==
Caroline (Candice Accola) is at the Salvatore house and tells Damon (Ian Somerhalder) and Stefan (Paul Wesley) that she met Katherine (Nina Dobrev) at the Grill. Katherine wants to deliver a message to the Salvatore brothers; bring her the moonstone at tonight's Masquerade Ball otherwise she will rip the town apart. The brothers agree that they have to kill Katherine and they start making their plan of how to do it.

Jenna (Sara Canning) gets back home after her "accident" with the knife and Elena and Jeremy (Steven R. McQueen) take care of her while Matt (Zach Roerig) helps them. Jeremy follows Elena in the kitchen and asks her what they will do about Katherine and Elena says nothing since now she will do whatever Katherine wants and she will stay away from Stefan. Jeremy does not believe that Katherine will stay away and leaves to go to the Salvatore house.

Bonnie (Kat Graham) arrives at the Salvatore house as well, where she finds Damon, Stefan, Jeremy, Caroline and Alaric (Matt Davis) getting ready for their plan against Katherine. Alaric shows them everything about his weapons and how to kill a vampire but they need Bonnie's help so they can trap Katherine with a spell in a room at the Lockwood house so Damon and Stefan can kill her. Bonnie hesitates at first but agrees to help under the condition that no one will get hurt.

In the meantime, Katherine gets ready for the Ball when Lucy (Natashia Williams) appears, a witch that Katherine called to help her get the moonstone back. She knows that Damon and Stefan will not give it without putting up a fight and she wants to be covered and she will take Lucy as her "plus one" at the Ball. After she will get the moonstone, she will need Lucy's help to break the curse.

Back at the Gilbert house, Matt heads to the Ball and he acts weird when he tells Elena that he has something to do but he can't tell her what. Elena tells him that she will stay home because she does not want to run into Stefan, having no idea what they all plan to do. Alaric gets there a little bit later since he has to keep an eye on Elena so she will not leave the house and get to the Ball.

At the Ball, Katherine arrives with Lucy and she runs into Matt. Matt is surprised seeing "Elena" there since she told him that she wouldn't come. Katherine compels him again to be sure that he knows what to do with Tyler (Michael Trevino) and when she is reassured that he does, she tells him to go. Stefan and Damon also arrive and look around to see if Katherine is there, while Jeremy and Bonnie find a room to prepare it with the spell.

After preparing the room, Jeremy and Bonnie return to the party when Bonnie gets a weird vibe. She follows her feeling and gets to Lucy asking her if they know each other. Lucy says no and leaves and Bonnie tries to ignore her feeling telling Jeremy that they have to tell Stefan and Damon that the room is ready.

Elena wonders why all her friends are at the Ball and asks Alaric what is going on but he does not want to tell her. He eventually does when she says that she will go to the Ball and Alaric has to stop her. Elena says she will stay home but she sneaks out telling Alaric and Jenna that she is going to sleep.

At the Ball, Katherine asks Stefan for a dance and while they are dancing she demands to give her the moonstone. Stefan says that he will if she follows him someplace where they will be alone, it's either his way or none. Aimee (Tiya Sircar) interrupts them and Katherine kills her to show Stefan that she is not playing; he should give her the moonstone or people will start dying. Stefan freaks out and wants to stop the whole thing but Damon convinces him that they have to finish it and they go to the room waiting and texting Jeremy that it is his turn.

Meanwhile, Lucy catches up Katherine worrying of the involvement of another witch and Katherine tells her that there is nothing to worry about. Jeremy interrupts them asking to talk to his sister and when Lucy leaves, he tells Katherine to meet Damon and Stefan by the lake for the switch and he walks away while texting Caroline to be ready. As soon as he gets out of sight, Elena pulls him aside and asks what is going on.

Katherine, suspecting that the Salvatores are up to something, turns to Caroline and demands to tell her what is going on. Caroline pretends that she does not know but under Katherine's threats, she tells her that they are planning to kill her, that Bonnie has the moonstone and that she is upstairs. Katherine gets upstairs with Caroline and falls into the trap imprisoning herself into the room where Damon and Stefan are waiting for her.

Meanwhile, Jeremy and Bonnie fill Elena in who thinks they are crazy before she bursts into pain exactly the same moment Damon fires a stake at Katherine's back. Bonnie figures out that Elena is linked to Katherine and tells Jeremy to run and tell Damon and Stefan to stop because they are hurting Elena. Jeremy gets to the room just in time to stop Damon from killing Katherine and in extent, Elena. Damon looks surprised and Katherine explains that she also has a witch on her side.

Bonnie realizes that the woman she saw earlier is a witch and tries to find her so she can break the link between Elena and Katherine. She finds her and asks her undo the spell but Lucy tries to walk away making Bonnie grab her arm. Lucy senses that Bonnie has the moonstone and asks her to give it to her telling her that she can trust her.

Meanwhile, Tyler and Matt are at Tyler's father office drinking along with Sarah (Maiara Walsh). Matt tries to get Tyler drunk and then starts doing things that get him mad. The two of them start to fight and Caroline, who overhears them, gets there and break them up. Matt says that he has to "finish" it, Tyler is confused of what is wrong with him and Caroline to manage stop Matt, she hits him. Sarah, who is revealed to be under compulsion as well, attacks Tyler and stabs him in the shoulder. Tyler pushes her back to defend himself and Sarah hits her head and dies, making Tyler trigger the curse and become a werewolf.

Back at the room, Lucy joins the three vampires having the moonstone in her possession. She informs Katherine that the spell on the room has been broken and she is free to go. She gives her the moonstone while first made it clear that after that she will not ask her for any more favors. Katherine agrees and takes the moonstone but she struggles under a power while Lucy tells her that she should have told her that there was a Bennett witch involved. Lucy tells Damon and Stefan that she has lifted the spell that binds Elena to Katherine, apologizes for her involvement and leaves.

Katherine wakes up in the tomb where Damon thought she had been all these years. Damon is standing outside and tells her that death would be very kind and that is why they entomb her. Katherine yells at him that he can't do this because they need her and because Elena is in danger. Elena is the doppelgänger and has to be protected. Damon says that he will protect her and closes the tomb's door trapping Katherine inside.

Stefan finds Elena in the Lockwood garden by the lake and tells her that Katherine is gone but Elena still doesn't change her mind about the two of them getting back together until she can be sure that everyone she cares about is safe. She walks away and gets to her car at the parking lot, but before she gets in a mysterious figure with a mask on his face grabs her and takes her away.

== Feature music ==
In "Masquerade" we can hear the songs:

- "On Melancholy Hill" by Gorillaz
- "Head over Heels" by Digital Daggers
- "People Change" by For King & Country
- "Fire in Your New Shoes" by Kaskade ft. Martina of Dragonette
- "Brave" by Tawgs Salter
- "Love My Way" by Cruel Black Dove
- "Under The Stars" by Morning Parade
- "Teeth" by Lady Gaga

== Reception ==
=== Ratings ===
In its original American broadcast, "Masquerade" was watched by 3.55 million; down by 0.07 from the previous episode.

=== Reviews ===
"Masquerade" received positive reviews.

Reagan from The TV Chick gave an A+ rate to the episode saying that it was awesome and action packed. "Loved this episode. Awesome on like 9 million levels. [...] We’ve now opened so many doors with Tyler being a werewolf, Bonnie getting into her power, Lucy as a reoccurring character, and of course the doppelganger business. I also like that Elena didn’t get right back together with Stefan. This show just keeps getting better, and I can’t wait to see where they take us next!"

Diana Steenbergen from IGN rated the episode with 9/10 stating that Dobrev continues her excellent work as both the evil Katherine and the sweet, earnest Elena and closes the review: "It is somewhat surprising that Katherine has been defeated this early in the season, but I am not complaining. The Vampire Diaries moves quickly, and it is better to move on before Katherine becomes one of those tiresome villains who can never be defeated. Although the show is wise to keep her alive; she hints that Elena is still in danger and that she has some information. I'm sure we will be getting back to Katherine and her information sooner or later."

Counter to Steenbergen, Matt Richenthal of TV Fanatic rated the episode with 3.5/5 saying that the episode was mediocre and a bit slow. "Not my favorite episode of The Vampire Diaries overall. But, as I said above, I'll take a disappointing installment over almost anything else on TV any day of the week."

Robin Franson Pruter from Forced Viewing rated the episode with 3/4. "Overall, there were enough good moments and developments in this episode for me to give it a positive star-rating. It’s entertaining to watch. However, it’s not as good as it should have been for such an important episode, and it’s not among the best of the series."

Tiffany of Den of Geek gave a good review to the episode saying that it made her have her hopes up. "All I can say is that next week better be one fantastic episode. They have my hopes up. This show is really picking up steam and I don't want it to have a midseason slump that kills the momentum they have going for them. There are some wonderful storylines going this season. I, for one, can not get enough of The Vampire Diaries."
