= Katerina (The Vampire Diaries) =

- The Vampire Diaries episode
- Episode no.: Season 2 Episode 9
- Directed by: J. Miller Tobin
- Written by: Andrew Chambliss
- Cinematography by: Paul M. Sommers
- Editing by: Lance Anderson
- Production code: 2J5259
- Original air date: November 11, 2010

Guest appearances
- Lauren Cohan as Rose; Trent Ford as Trevor; Daniel Gillies as Elijah Mikaelson; Bryton James as Luka Martin; Trevor Peterson as Slater; Randy J. Goodwin as Jonas Martin

Episode chronology
← Previous "Rose"	Next → "The Sacrifice"
- The Vampire Diaries season 2

"Katerina" is the ninth episode of the second season of the American supernatural teen drama television series The Vampire Diaries, and the 31st of the series. It aired on The CW on November 11, 2010. The episode was written by executive story editor Andrew Chambliss and directed by producer J. Miller Tobin.

== Plot ==
The episode starts with a flashback to Bulgaria in 1490 where Katerina (Nina Dobrev) gives birth to a baby girl but her father takes it away immediately because the pregnancy brought shame to the family.

Back to the present, Damon (Ian Somerhalder) and Stefan (Paul Wesley) call Elena to their home to inform her about what Rose (Lauren Cohan) told them. Rose tries to convince them that Klaus is really dangerous and Elijah (Daniel Gillies) is nothing in front of him but the Salvatores try to calm Elena down by saying that nothing of these might be true. Rose warns them again and Elena leaves for High School rejecting Stefan's offer to go with her for protection.

Jeremy (Steven R. McQueen) asks Bonnie (Kat Graham) to play pool with him after school and Bonnie agrees. Their conversation gets interrupted by a new student, Luka (Bryton James), who asks for directions for the school's office. Later on, Bonnie gets to the Grill but Jeremy is not there yet so she sits with Luka who introduces his father Jonas (Randy J. Goodwin ) to her. Jonas gets weird by asking about Bonnie's family from Salem. Jeremy arrives and Bonnie gets the chance to get away but before she leaves, she touches Luka's shoulder and she gets a strange feeling about him.

Elena wants to know if what Rose said about Klaus is true and plans to go talk to Katherine. She asks Caroline's (Candice Accola) help by asking her to not tell Stefan where she is. Caroline does not agree with Elena's plan but she promises to keep her secret. They arrive at the tomb where Katherine is locked and Caroline opens the door. Elena reassures her that she will be safe and Caroline leaves.

Elena asks Katherine about Klaus and even if Katherine is not willing to start talking, she changes her mind when Elena offers her some blood she brought with her. Katherine starts saying her story, which started back in England in 1492. Her father had kicked her out of the house after she gave birth to her little girl and she traveled to England where she met Klaus but when she found out why he wanted her around, she ran away to save her life.

1492: Katerina runs in the woods and tries to hide from Elijah and his loyal followers. Trevor (Trent Ford) appears and misleads them to the opposite direction and helps Katerina escape. He tells her to go to a cottage not far away from where she will be safe. Katerina gets there and finds Rose who is upset by Trevor's actions and tells Katerina that she will turn her back to Klaus that night.

Present: Katherine tells Elena that Klaus wanted to sacrifice her to break the vampire curse and that is exactly what he wants to do now to Elena. The doppelganger was created because the curse was bound with Petrova blood and only with Petrova blood will break. Elena wonders why the Originals want to break the curse since they are already able to walk in the sun and Katherine explains that whoever breaks the curse first binds the other species to stay cursed forever and that's why the Originals want to break the curse before werewolves do it.

Meanwhile, Caroline tries to keep Stefan busy so he won't go out searching for Elena by telling him that she told Tyler (Michael Trevino) about her being a vampire. Stefan is mad at her because she put herself in danger and also because Damon will kill her if he finds out. Caroline does everything to keep Stefan with her but he can figure out that she is doing it to cover Elena. He asks her where Elena is but Caroline keeps her promise to Elena and does not tell him. Stefan leaves upset to find Elena.

At the Salvatore house, Damon asks Rose how they can get in touch with Klaus. Rose says that she got in touch with Elijah via Slater (Trevor Peterson), a vampire who lives in Richmond. Damon does not waste any time and they immediately leave to find Slater. They meet him at a cafe that is built in a way that does not allow the sun burn the vampires but Trevor's contacts stop to Elijah and he does not know how to reach Klaus. Outside the cafe, Elijah listens to the whole conversation between Damon, Rose and Slater and he is not happy with what is happening. He throws some coins at the cafe's windows breaking them, something that lets the sun pass through and the vampires start burning. Slater manages to run away and Damon covers Rose and takes her out of the reach of the sun. Rose is upset because she knows Klaus is behind this and he will kill them all.

Back at the tomb, Katherine continues her story; 1492: Katerina stabs herself because she prefers to die than go back to Klaus. Rose does not let her die and gives her her blood to heal her when Trevor arrives and tells Rose that he loves Katerina and he wants to help her run away. While Rose tries to talk sense to him, Katerina gets the opportunity and suicides, triggering her own transformation to a vampire since she knows that as a vampire she would be useless to Klaus.

Katerina wakes up a little later and Rose and Trevor realize that she used both of them to achieve her goal; become a vampire. Rose tries to stake her but Katerina gets away. Back on the present, Elena is shocked that Katherine killed herself and ruined Rose and Trevor's lives but Katherine says that everything she did was to protect herself, something she will always do. Elena guesses that Katherine's return was to hand her over to Klaus something that Katherine does not deny. Elena asks what else is needed to break the curse and Katherine says: a doppelganger (Elena), a vampire (Caroline), a werewolf (Mason but since Damon killed him, she turned Tyler), a witch (Bonnie) and the moonstone.

Luka gets back to the Grill to apologize to Bonnie for his father's earlier behavior and he also reveals that he and his father are warlocks who just try to fit to their new home. Bonnie believes him and the two of them start talking and getting closer, while Jeremy watches from afar.

Stefan figures out where Elena is and gets to the tomb. He tells Elena that whatever Katherine told her is a lie because she is a liar and that he will do everything to protect her. Katherine interrupts him to tell him that Elena is doomed and he cannot do anything about it. She finishes her story by telling them that when she run away, Klaus went to her home and killed everyone she loved. She reassures them that Klaus will do the same to Elena's family and friends if he cannot get to her. Katherine offers them the moonstone but Stefan accuses her that she only gives it to them to trade it with her freedom but Katherine points out that her being trapped in the tomb makes her the safest vampire in town when Klaus comes to kill everyone since he won't want to get into a tomb where he will not be able to get out.

Damon and Rose are back at the Salvatore house and they end up kissing and have sex. Later, while they talk, Slater calls Rose to tell her that he doesn't want to be involved in their plans but he tells her that if they want to destroy the curse they will have to get the moonstone and a witch. He hangs up the phone and it's revealed that Elijah is there with him who compelled him to say those things to Rose. Elijah also compels Slater to stake himself, something that Slater does and dies.

The episode ends with Jonas entering the room asking Elijah if it was necessary to kill Slater and Elijah says that it was.

== Feature music ==
In "Katerina" we can hear the songs:

- "Amen Omen" by Ben Harper
- "Precious Stone" by Pete Yorn
- "You Always Get What You Want" by Atomic Tom
- "A Moment Changes Everything" by David Gray
- "Puritan Heart" by Matt Duncan
- "Light Love" by Free Energy
- "Trap of Mirrors" by The Pass

== Reception ==
=== Ratings ===
In its original American broadcast, "Katerina" was watched by 3.50 million; down by 0.13 from the previous episode.

=== Reviews ===
"Katerina" received positive reviews.

Reagan from The TV Chick gave an A rating to the episode. "I loved getting the background on Katherine. I feel like it really puts a lot of the pieces together for why a lot of things happened the way they did... I'm really excited to see where Luka and Dr. Martin fit into all of this. I also can't wait for more Katherine. She is super fly."

Diana Steenbergen from IGN rated the episode with 8/10 stating: "There may not be a lot of action in The Vampire Diaries this week, but there is more than enough information handed out [...] More specifically, the history of the vampires who are trying to find [Katherine]." Steenbergen also praised Dobrev's work on portraying multiple characters on the show with this week having to portray Katherine as well before she became a vampire. "It is a credit to Dobrev's portrayal that she can give Katherine so much nuance after the character has been painted as such a villain up to this point."

Matt Richenthal of TV Fanatic rated the episode with 4.4/5 saying that the episode was not the most action-packed one but it was a necessary installment and an essential information dump. Richenthal also praised Dobrev's work on the episode. "The Vampire Diaries introduced viewers to the Long Island Iced Tea of curse-breaking spells last night. But instead of a mixture of ingredients that simply lead to a hangover, the recipe Katherine described to Elena could result in the sacrifice of almost every Mystic Falls resident we know and love. Welcome to the latest twist in the most shocking show on television."

Robin Farson Pruter from Forced Viewing rated the episode with 3/4 saying that it was an exposition-heavy episode that explores the history of Katherine, Klaus and The Originals. "Mostly, this episode is about unfolding information, and the writers make a solid effort to undercut the tedium of that process." Farson Pruter also praises Dobrev: "Dobrev’s double duty in [the last scene], as Katherine and Elena, is so well done, their demeanors are so different, that it’s easy to forget that we’re watching the same actress play two roles."

Josie Kafka from Doux Reviews rated the episode with 3.75/4.
