= Founder's Day (The Vampire Diaries) =

- The Vampire Diaries episode
- Episode no.: Season 1 Episode 22
- Directed by: Marcos Siega
- Written by: Bryan Oh; Andrew Chambliss
- Cinematography by: Paul M. Sommers
- Editing by: Joshua Butler
- Production code: 2J5021
- Original air date: May 13, 2010

Guest appearances
- Malese Jow as Anna; David Anders as John Gilbert; Marguerite MacIntyre as Liz Forbes; Mike Erwin as Charlie

Episode chronology
← Previous "Isobel"	Next → "The Return"
- The Vampire Diaries season 1

"Founder's Day" is the twenty-second and season finale episode of the first season of the American supernatural teen drama television series The Vampire Diaries. It aired on The CW on May 13, 2010. The episode was written by co-producer Bryan Oh and executive story editor Andrew Chambliss, and directed by co-executive producer Marcos Siega.

== Plot ==
Everybody gets ready for the Founder's Day parade and gets dressed up in period outfits, including Elena (Nina Dobrev), something that makes her look like Katherine even more. Damon (Ian Somerhalder) tells Stefan (Paul Wesley) that he does not need to worry since he will not steal his girlfriend.

Anna (Malese Jow) shows up in Jeremy's (Steven R. McQueen) room to tell him that John (David Anders) was the one who killed her mother and she wants to leave town. She gives Jeremy a vial with her blood telling him that she could turn him to go with her if he wanted to but Jeremy changed his mind since the first time he asked her to turn him.

Elena is shocked by the news Stefan told her; that John is her birth father. Elena wonders if she has to confront him and ask him if it is true while she is also worried if Jeremy will ever forgive her. She tries to talk to him but Jeremy tells her to go to hell, something that Damon catches from afar. He follows Jeremy and aggressively tries to tell him not to treat Elena that way. Stefan interferes, apologizing to Jeremy for everything that happened, but Jeremy still does not feel like forgiving Elena.

Tyler (Michael Trevino) tries to make up with Matt (Zach Roerig) but Matt is still mad at him. Caroline (Candice Accola) tries to talk Matt into forgiving Tyler but he cuts her off. Meanwhile, Damon thanks Bonnie (Kat Graham) for removing the spell from the Gilbert device that could have killed him.

While the parade is in progress, John explains to Mayor Lockwood (Robert Pralgo) the plan of how they will use the device to find the vampires, who plan to attack the town in the night, and kill them. When the device is activated, it will produce a high pitched sound that humans will not be able to hear and it will force the vampires to reveal themselves. The council's team will inject them with vervain and gather them all together at the old Gilbert office, where they will burn them. Sheriff Forbes (Marguerite MacIntyre) enters and she does not agree with John's plan to use the town as a bait since their children will be among the crowd. John asks to talk alone to the Sheriff. He knocks her out and handcuffs her to the ventilation pipes while at the same time, the tomb vampires plan their attack when Anna shows up.

Anna comes to Damon to inform him that the tomb vampires are already in the town planning to attack when the fireworks go off and their target is the founding families. She only met with them earlier to find out their plan. Damon figures out that John is planning to use the device but because he still thinks that the device will not work, he runs to find Alaric (Matt Davis) and ask for his help. He also tells Elena and Stefan about the vampires being there and asks Stefan to take Elena out of town. The two of them run to find Jeremy while Damon leaves to find John.

The Mayor gets into the Grill looking for Tyler. He asks him to go home but when Tyler ignores him, his father becomes aggressive. Matt and Caroline interfere taking Tyler's side and the Mayor, calmer, politely asks Tyler to go home and take his friends with him, handing him over his car keys. Anna also finds Jeremy at the Grill and tries to explain to him everything that is going on.

Back at the celebration, the Mayor gives a speech about the 150th anniversary of their town and gives the signal for the fireworks to start, while the vampires wait to start their attack and John waits to activate the device. Damon walks into the old Gilbert office to confront John, but John activates the device and Damon collapses. John injects him with vervain. At the same time, the vampires outside start to collapse too with the council's team finding them and injecting them with vervain. Stefan collapses too but Alaric gets there in time to direct the deputy to another vampire and help Elena take Stefan away. Anna does not have the same luck, since they find her and take her away while she is with Jeremy and before she manages to completely tell him what is going on. Mayor Lockwood also collapses because of the sound and is taken away.

Tyler, Matt and Caroline are on their way home when John activates the device. Tyler hears the noise and loses control of the car, which crashes into a gate. The paramedics get to the scene and examine the unconscious Tyler. His pulse is steady but when the paramedic tries to examine his eyes, they don't look human. Tyler wakes up and his eyes are back to normal. Caroline, who seemed perfectly fine before, collapses.

John deactivates the device since the deputies have found all the vampires, while Alaric, Stefan and Elena realize what is going on and that Bonnie did not remove the spell from the device. They wonder where Damon is and Elena asks Alaric to find Jeremy and take him home while she and Stefan run to find Damon. They run into John who has already put a fire on the basement of the old Gilbert office to burn the vampires.

Meanwhile, at the basement, Damon spots the Mayor among the prisoners and wonders why he is there. Damon can see that vervain did not affect him, which means that he is not a vampire, but he cannot understand what he is. The Mayor tries to get away from Damon but he gets closer to the leader of the tomb vampires who breaks his neck. At the same time, Mrs. Lockwood finds Sheriff Forbes and frees her from the handcuffs informing her that the deputies have taken her husband and she doesn't know why or where they took him.

John dares Stefan to try and save his brother since he is certain that he will not make it out alive. Elena attempts to follow Stefan and John stops her. Elena tells him that as her father should care about the people she loves and cares about, something that surprises John. John's surprise makes Elena sure that he is her father and she leaves to help Damon.

Bonnie stops Stefan right before he enters the burning building warning him that the fire will kill him but Stefan gets in anyway. Bonnie then stops Elena but when she sees that Elena will go in anyway, she starts chanting while holding her to prevent her from getting in. The spell calms the fire long enough for Stefan to get to Damon and help him get out. Elena and Stefan meet a little later at the Grill where Elena reassures Stefan that she loves him and not Damon, even though she cares about him.

Damon goes to Jeremy's room to inform him about Anna's death and that he wanted to help her but he could not. He knows that Jeremy must be in pain and he offers to take the pain away like he did before but this time it will be his choice. Jeremy tells him that even if he erased his memory the pain is still there and compelling him again will not take the pain away now either. Jeremy asks if what Anna told him, that vampires can turn off their humanity and do not feel, is true and Damon says that it is. Vampires can turn off their humanity and that makes life easier but not better. Damon leaves and Jeremy drinks Anna's blood that she brought him earlier. He then finds a bottle of Elena's old painkillers and takes them.

At the hospital, Sheriff tells Matt and Tyler that Caroline is bleeding internally and the doctors are taking her into surgery while she also tells Tyler about his father and that he should call his mother to tell her. Meanwhile back in town, Bonnie runs into Stefan and explains to him that she only saved him and Damon because of Elena. Bonnie promises Stefan that if Damon will not change and he hurts one more person, she will take him down even if that means she will have to take Stefan down as well.

Elena comes home and finds Damon on his way out. The two of them have a talk with Damon opening up and thanking her for saving him today. They end up kissing when Jenna (Sara Canning) opens the door and sees them. Jenna orders Elena to come inside and she closes the door behind her asking Elena what is she doing but Elena does not want to talk about it.

John is in the kitchen when Elena shows up. John tries to tell her how he met Isobel and how turning her into a vampire changed her completely when Elena grabs a knife and cuts off his fingers, severing him from his ring. John realizes that this is not Elena but Katherine but it is too late to do anything and Katherine stabs him in the stomach.

The episode ends with real Elena coming back home talking with Stefan on the phone and telling him that someone took her clothes from her locker. She gets into the house to check on Jeremy before she leaves for the hospital to see Caroline when she hears a noise from the kitchen and she heads there.

== Feature music ==
In "Founder's Day" we can hear the songs:

- "Bury Me Alive" by We Are the Fallen
- "It Is What It Is" by Lifehouse
- "Every Time You Go" by Ellie Goulding
- "Bloodstream" by Stateless
- "You've Changed" by Sia
- "True Faith" by Anberlin

== Reception ==
=== Ratings ===
In its original American broadcast, "Founder's Day" was watched by 3.47 million; up by 0.16 from the previous episode.

=== Reviews ===
"Founder's Day" received positive reviews.

Matt Richenthal from TV Fanatic rated the episode with 4.9/5. "Wow. What a season finale! Producers had promised us a bunch of cliffhangers and they delivered. [...] Indeed, it was a stunning conclusion to what had been a somewhat meandering, disappointing episode. But that all changed with the thrust of Katherine's knife."

Josie Kafka of Doux Reviews rated the episode with 4/4. "I really didn’t see the Elena/Katherine fake-out coming. I was surprised that Elena kissed Damon, but it was so very darn sexy that I thought maybe she just got caught up in the moment. Even when she grabbed the knife, I still wasn’t sure. It wasn’t until she cut off all of Sark’s fingers that I realized Elena would probably not have the nerve to do something so gory with her aunt and brother in the house."

Diana Steenbergen from IGN rated the episode with 9/10 saying that the show has turned into one of the better guilty pleasures on TV and that the cliffhangers are plentiful at the end of the hour. "One of the great things about The Vampire Diaries is the pacing. The storylines move at breakneck speed; a conflict is introduced one week, it is resolved the next and a new conflict crops up. The big ticket items this week are Elena finding out who her father really is, Bonnie admitting that she did not remove the power of Johnathan Gilbert's device, and Damon's newfound humanity. Each storyline is suitably addressed in the hour, and as usual, new problems present themselves by the end." Steenbergen also praised Somerhalder, saying that is the best part of the show: "He is ridiculously entertaining as Damon, the sometime evil Salvatore brother. Damon has a bit of an advantage on poor Stefan, since it is so much fun to watch the snarky, obnoxious behavior Damon dishes out to everyone."

Robin Franson Pruter of Forced Viewing rated the episode with 4/4 saying that the episode was satisfying on every level. "An exciting, engrossing end to the first season, "Founder’s Day" stands as a paragon of the serialized drama season finale. [...] We, the viewers, are left staring at the screen in mute astonishment, until it dawns on us that we’ll have to wait three months in breathless anticipation of the next season’s premiere." Franson Pruter also commented on Dobrev's acting as Elena/Katherine saying that she was impressed: "I’m really impressed with Nina Dobrev in this episode. As much as I was fooled along with Damon and Jenna by Katherine’s masquerade during the porch scene, watching this episode again, I can see Dobrev using gestures and expressions we will come to associate with Katherine."

Meg of Two Cents TV gave a good review to the episode saying that it was amazing and the season was eventful and incredible. "Holy crap! Holy crap! I’m still reeling from the last five minutes of tonight’s season finale. It’s (finally!) Founder’s Day in Mystic Falls, and with it comes murder, mutilation, mayhem, and one helluva cliffhanger!"

Jen Yamato from HitFix gave a good review to the episode saying that the season finale went out with a bang. "Completing an incredibly strong 22-episode run, "The Vampire Diaries" ended its first season not just with a bang, but with an explosive, fiery, violent, sexy bang that tied up some story threads and created other deliciously unexpected ones. This was an episode that gave a lot to fans, a tense piece of storytelling that offered plenty of hints and foreshadowing and delivered on clues dropped throughout the season."

Popsugar of Buzzsugar also gave a good review to the episode stating: "I can barely express my grief that The Vampire Diaries is over for the season — but what an insane season finale! Also causing me grief? The three, and possibly more, deaths that we witness on Founder's Day!"

Mark O. Estes from TV Overmind gave a good review to the episode saying that the show "killed it tonight" leaving him can't wait for the new season.
