= Rose (The Vampire Diaries) =

- The Vampire Diaries episode
- Episode no.: Season 2 Episode 8
- Directed by: Liz Friedlander
- Written by: Brian Young
- Cinematography by: Paul M. Sommers
- Editing by: Nicholas Erasmus
- Production code: 2J5258
- Original air date: November 4, 2010

Guest appearances
- Lauren Cohan as Rose; Trent Ford as Trevor; Daniel Gillies as Elijah Mikaelson

Episode chronology
← Previous "Masquerade"	Next → "Katerina"
- The Vampire Diaries season 2

"Rose" is the eighth episode of the second season of the American supernatural teen drama television series The Vampire Diaries, and the 30th of the series. It aired on The CW on November 4, 2010. The episode was written by story editor Brian Young and directed by Liz Friedlander.

== Plot ==
The man who kidnapped Elena (Nina Dobrev) meets Trevor (Trent Ford), the vampire who asked him to kidnap her, and transports her into his car. Right after Elena is in Trevor's car, Trevor kills the man and leaves with the unconscious Elena.

Damon (Ian Somerhalder) talks with Caroline (Candice Accola) about Tyler (Michael Trevino) and how she covered him killing Sarah in the previous episode, something that triggered the curse and will now turn him into a werewolf to the next full moon. Damon warns her to stay away from him and not let him know about her being a vampire or other vampires because a bite of his can kill them. Caroline says she will stay away from Tyler and leaves for school.

Jeremy (Steven R. McQueen) runs into Stefan (Paul Wesley) and thinks that Elena slept over at his house since she did not sleep at her bed the previous night. Stefan tells him that Elena was not with him and they realize that she is missing. Stefan tells Damon who tells Stefan about what Katherine said before he locked her in the tomb; that Elena is in danger but he did not believe her. Stefan wants to talk to Katherine but Damon says they'll find another way to find Elena because Katherine will negotiate her freedom and that is something they do not want.

Trevor takes Elena, who wakes up, in an abandoned house. She asks him what he wants from her but he does not answer when Rose (Lauren Cohan) appears and is shocked on how much Elena resembles Katherine. Elena thinks they confused her with Katherine and that is why they took her and she tries to tell them. Rose already knows but she reassures her that they know who she is. Elena overhears the two of them talking about a guy named Elijah (Daniel Gillies) and the deal they want to have with him; give him Elena in exchange for their freedom.

Back in Mystic Falls, Stefan asks Bonnie to undo the tomb spell so Katherine can get out but Bonnie doesn't want to do it. Instead, she tries another spell to find Elena's location. The spell works and Stefan and Damon leave to find her while Jeremy stays behind with Bonnie, whose nose started bleeding after the spell but she hides it and no one sees it.

At High School, Tyler tries to talk to Caroline and asks her how does she know about him, but Caroline pretends that she doesn't know what he is talking about. Tyler does not believe her and he later goes to her house to confront her. He thinks she is also a werewolf and he will not leave until she admits it. Eventually, Caroline reveals herself as a vampire and she tells him that he must not tell anyone. Tyler admits that he is scared the day the full moon will come and he will have to turn into a wolf and Caroline tries to comfort him.

Jeremy and Bonnie are at the Gilbert house waiting for news and Bonnie tries a new spell. She tries to send Elena a message but during the spell, her nose bleeds again. As soon as she completes it, she collapses. Jeremy manages to recover her and she asks him not to tell anyone about what happened.

Meanwhile, Elena wants to know who Elijah is and keeps asking Rose and Trevor about him. Rose explains that he is one of the Originals from which she and Trevor are running away for 500 years. The Originals want them dead because they helped Katherine escape and now they just want Elena to deliver her to Elijah in exchange for their lives/freedom. Elena is valuable to them because her blood (a doppelganger's blood) can break the vampire/werewolf curse. While Rose talks to Elena, Trevor is not sure if it is a good idea that they called Elijah to come and when he arrives, Trevor freaks out, something that makes Elena realize that they are afraid of him. Rose manages to calm him down and leaves to meet Elijah.

Rose meets Elijah and tells him that Katherine survived back in 1864 and that there is also a human doppelganger of hers. Elijah seems unwilling to believe her but he does when he sees Elena. Trevor apologizes for his betrayal to Elijah who forgives him but he still kills him. Elena is terrified of him and tries to negotiate with him by telling him that she knows where the moonstone is. When she refuses to tell him unless he lets her free, Elijah tears off her vervain necklace and compels her to tell him.

In the meantime, Stefan and Damon have arrived and they enter the house to save Elena. They distract Elijah and take Elena and Rose to safety. They attack him and Damon manages to impale him on the front door with a wooden stake and kills him. Elena is relieved, hugs Stefan and thanks Damon while Rose runs away. They all return home, Elena reunites with Jeremy and Bonnie and the Salvatore brothers agree to set aside the fights and protect Elena together.

Rose appears at the Salvatore house to offer her help because, as she says, Elijah might be dead but the rest of the Originals will come for Elena because they all work for him; Klaus. In the meantime, Damon pays a visit to Elena to give her back her vervain necklace but before he does it, he admits to her that he loves her and then compels her to forget about it. He leaves the room and Elena stays behind with the necklace, wondering what happened.

The episode ends with Elijah coming back to life and unimpaling himself from the door looking mad.

== Feature music ==
In "Rose" we can hear the songs:

- "Ocean Wide" by The Afters
- "We Rule the World" by Dragonette
- "Wolf Like Me" by TV on the Radio
- "Blood" by Editors
- "In My Veins" by Andrew Belle
- "Love Song" by Cruel Black Dove
- "I Was Wrong" by Sleepstar

== Reception ==
=== Ratings ===
In its original American broadcast, "Rose" was watched by 3.63 million; up by 0.08 from the previous episode.

=== Reviews ===
"Rose" received positive reviews.

Matt Richenthal of TV Fanatic rated the episode with 5/5 saying that it was bloody fantastic. "The episode "Rose" had it all, from a brotherly road trip to a whirlwind of a fight to an outpouring of information to an entirely new direction for our favorite characters...and that was all before Damon caused every living room in American to fill up with dust when he finally told Elena the words he needed to say...just once."

Diana Steenbergen from IGN rated the episode with 9/10 saying: "Every element of what the show does best is on display in "Rose": quick-paced storytelling, an ever-expanding mythology and likable characters with unexpected relationships."

Reagan of The TV Chick gave a B+ rating to the episode saying that it was a good, solid one. "We definitely found out a ton more information as far as the curse goes. We also met some new pertinent characters. Most importantly, we found out about the Original Vampires. I also really liked finding out that Katherine was the Petrova Doppelganger. [...] I’m looking forward to finding out more about all of this."

Josie Kafka from Doux Reviews rated the episode with 3.5/4 even saying that it was not one of the best episodes. "This was not the best episode ever, and it had some glaring inconsistencies, but the Massive Information Dump pretty much set up the rest of the season and contributed a huge amount of (relevant) lore to the world of the Vampire Diaries."

The review from Den of Geek was positive with the reviewer saying that it was a pretty good episode with a good set-up which will allow the next one to start with a bang. "While I was shocked to find out that Elena is the key to the sun and moon curse, I wasn't expecting to find out that Katherine was once a doppelganger herself. I am interested to see where this news takes us in episodes to come."

Despite the positive reviews, Robin Franson Pruter of Forced Viewing rated the episode with 2/4 saying that it was an uneven episode introduces major storyline and characters. "Overall, this episode is a mixed bag. Too much of the episode is weak for me to give it a positive judgment, but two strong closing scenes—one relationship-related, one plot/threat-related—and the beginning of a new relationship (Caroline/Tyler, which, at this point, is merely friendship) keep the episode on the cusp of being good."
