= Randy J. Goodwin =

American actor

- Born: Ivan Jerome Goodwin; December 24, 1967 (age 58); Omaha, Nebraska
- Occupation: Actor
- Years active: 1996–present
- Spouse: Lisa Stellato (m. 2000; div. 2005) Mimi Goodwin (m. 2005; div. 2015)
- Children: 4

Randy J. Goodwin (born as Ivan Jerome Goodwin on December 24, 1967), is an American actor. He is perhaps best known for his role as "Kennedy Winslow" on Fast Track and "Max Ellis" on the show Abby, as well as his recurring roles on Girlfriends as "Davis Hamilton" and The Vampire Diaries as "Dr. Jonas Martin".

== Career ==
Goodwin was a member of GBT Academy of the Arts Advisory Board, serving as an actor and writer. Goodwin is set to direct his first full-length feature film in April 2013, a Christian film entitled The Job, written by Steve Lee and Randy Goodwin, with Goodwin set to star as well..

== Filmography ==
=== Film ===
Year	Title	Role	Notes
1999	Michael Jordan: An American Hero	Ahmad Rashad	TV movie
2000	Down 'n Dirty	Nick Gleem	
2000	Livin' for Love: The Natalie Cole Story	Marvin Yancy	TV movie
2001	The Old Settler	Bucket	
2001	Neurotic Tendencies	-	TV movie
2002	Home of the Brave	Sgt. Mike	TV movie
2003	L.A. Sheriff's Homicide	Welton Swancy	TV movie
2004	The Soluna Project	Tim	TV movie
2005	Flip the Script	Jamal	
2005	Bow	Sam	TV movie
2007	Towelhead	Mr. Bradley	
2011	Annie Claus is Coming to Town	Barry	
2016	The Holy Man	Lester Bunin	
2019	Ernesto's Manifesto	Daniel	
2020	The Call	Principal	
2021	The Job	Lance 'The Dance' Foster	

=== Television ===
Year	Title	Role	Notes
1996	Secret Service Guy	Morgue	Episode: "Throw Kessler from the Train"
1997-98	Fast Track	Kennedy Winslow	Main cast
1998	Hyperion Bay	-	Episode: "Pilot"
1998	Martial Law	Beckwith	Episode: "Cop Out"
1999	Nash Bridges	Agent Cornwell	Episode: "Shoot the Moon"
1999	The Pretender	Dr. Allen Covney	Episode: "Risque Business"
1999-00	Linc's	Dante Harrison	Recurring cast: season 2
2000	The Steve Harvey Show	Reggie Carmichael	Episode: "Moonlighting"
2000-04	Girlfriends	Davis Hamilton	Recurring cast: season 1, guest: season 4
2001	The Geena Davis Show	Russell Moore	Episode: "There's a New Bride in Town"
2001	PBS Hollywood Presents	Bucket	Episode: "The Old Settler"
2001	Emeril	Eric	Episode: "Blind Dates"
2002	24	Newman	Episode: "6:00 p.m.-7:00 p.m."
2003	Wanda at Large	Morris	Episode: "Unaired Pilot"
2003	CSI: Crime Scene Investigation	Myles Rueben	Episode: "Grissom Versus the Volcano"
2003	Coupling	Neil	Episode: "Dressed"
2003	Abby	Max Ellis	Main cast
2004	Yes, Dear	The Doctor	Episode: "Mama Said Knock You Out"
2004	NCIS	Diego Clare	Episode: "UnSEALeD"
2004	Strong Medicine	Dr. Jason Harris	Episode: "Like Cures Like"
2004	Kevin Hill	Victor Martin	Episode: "Gods and Monsters"
2005	CSI: Miami	Jason Whitney	Episode: "Sex & Taxes"
2006	Cuts	Nick	Episode: "Codebreakers"
2007	Insatiable	Jack Dudleigh	Episode: "Pilot"
2007-08	Big Shots	Oliver Davenport	Recurring cast
2010-11	The Vampire Diaries	Dr. Jonas Martin	Recurring cast: Season 2
2012	The Mentalist	Agent Bernie Westeroff	Episode: "My Bloody Valentine"
2013	The Client List	Pastor Mason Duncan	Episode: "Heaven's Just a Sin Away" & "When I Say I Do"
2013	Love Thy Neighbor	Lionel	Episode: "What’s Love Got To Do With It"
2014	Dog with a Blog	Barry Barnes	Episode: "The Kids Find Out Stan Blogs"
2014	General Hospital	Agent Bob Massicotte	Episode: "Episode #1.13191" & "#1.13200"
2014	Luna	Agent Robert Colt	Episode: "Pilot"
2015	Best Friends Whenever	Vance Carroway	Episode: "A Time to Rob and Slam"
2017	Grey's Anatomy	Eric Young	Episode: "Who Is He (And What Is He to You)?"
2019	The Rookie	Jeff Turner	Episode: "Standoff"
2020	9-1-1	Skydiving Pilot	Episode: "Seize the Day"
2021	NCIS	Clark Anderson	Episode: "False Start"
2021	Dynasty	Brady Lloyd	Recurring cast: season 4
2022	All American: Homecoming	Xavier Sims	Episode: "Just a Friend"
2023	Star Trek: Picard	Jae Hwang	Episode: "Disengage"

=== Video games ===
Year	Title	Role	Notes
1999	Fleet Command	Petty Officer 1st Class Lawrence Ingram, USN Operation Specialist	
