= Taylor Kinney =

American actor (born 1981)

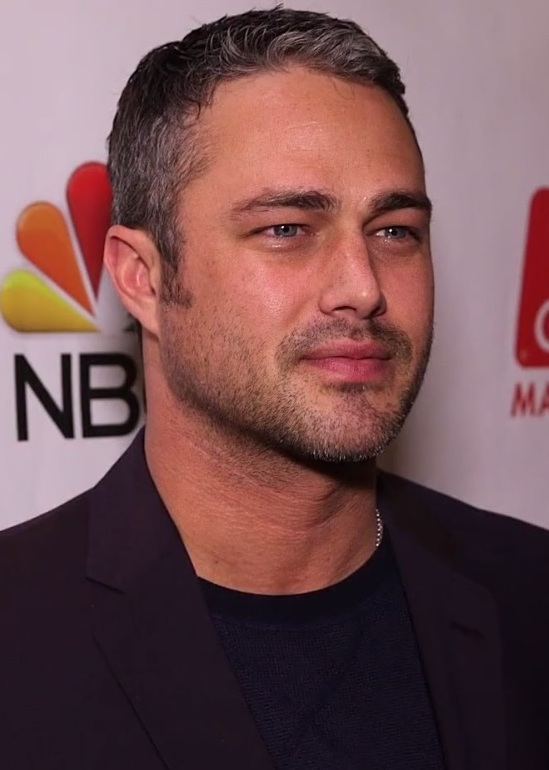
- Kinney in 2016
- Born: July 15, 1981 (age 45); Lancaster, Pennsylvania, U.S.
- Education: West Virginia University
- Occupation: Actor
- Years active: 2006–present
- Spouse: Ashley Cruger (m. 2024)

Taylor Jackson Kinney (born July 15, 1981) is an American actor. He played Jared in Zero Dark Thirty, Phil in The Other Woman, and Chicago Fire Department captain Kelly Severide in the drama series Chicago Fire. He also played Craig, one of Fiona's love interests, in the series Shameless.

== Early life and education ==
Taylor Jackson Kinney was born in Lancaster, Pennsylvania on July 15, 1981.

In 2000, he graduated from Lancaster Mennonite School. Kinney studied Business Management at West Virginia University in Morgantown, West Virginia.

== Career ==
Kinney played Luke Gianni on Fashion House (2006) on MyNetworkTV, and played Glenn Morrison on Trauma on NBC. Kinney had a recurring role on the supernatural drama The Vampire Diaries, joining the cast during the second season as Mason Lockwood. In 2011, Kinney was featured in Lady Gaga's music video for the song "You and I".

In 2012, Kinney landed a starring role on Chicago Fire, a drama series that follows the lives of firefighters and paramedics. Kinney plays Lieutenant Kelly Severide on Rescue Squad 3 opposite former House star Jesse Spencer. Also in 2012, Kinney appeared on the big screen in Kathryn Bigelow's acclaimed war drama Zero Dark Thirty. In 2012, he guest starred on Shameless as Craig, the former high school crush of the lead character Fiona (played by Emmy Rossum).

== Personal life ==
Kinney began dating singer Lady Gaga in July 2011. They first met in Nebraska while working on the music video for her song "You and I", and started dating soon afterwards. They became engaged in February 2015, but ended up calling off their engagement in July 2016.

In 2024, Kinney married model Ashley Cruger.

== Filmography ==
=== Film ===
Year	Title	Role	Notes
2007	White Air	Frank	
2007	Furnace	Bill Jamison	
2010	Scorpio Men on Prozac	May's Lover	
2011	Prodigal	Brad Searcy	Short film
2012	Least Among Saints	Jesse	
2012	Stars in Shorts	Brad Searcy	
2012	Zero Dark Thirty	Jared	
2014	The Other Woman	Phil Hampton	
2015	Consumed	Eddie	
2015	Rock the Kasbah	Private Barnes	
2016	The Forest	Aiden	
2018	Here and Now	Jordan	

=== Television ===
Year	Title	Role	Notes
2006	Fashion House	Luke Gianni	Main role; 35 episodes
2007	What About Brian	Jared	Episode: "What About Secret Lovers..."
2008	Bones	Jimmy Fields	Episode: "Player Under Pressure"
2009–2010	Trauma	Glenn Morrison	Main role; 18 episodes
2010–2011	The Vampire Diaries	Mason Lockwood	Recurring role; 10 episodes
2011	A Mann's World	France	Television film
2011	Five	Tommy	Television film
2011	CSI: NY	Jason Locke	Episode: "Identity Crisis"
2011	Rizzoli & Isles	Jesse Wade	Episode: "Don't Hate the Player"
2012	Dating Rules for My Future Self	Dave	Recurring role
2012	Shameless	Craig Heisner	Recurring role; 2 episodes
2012	Castle	Darren Thomas	Episode: "Once Upon a Crime"
2012	Breakout Kings	Perry	Episode: "SEALd Fate"
2012–present	Chicago Fire	Lieutenant/Captain Kelly Severide	Lead role; 231 episodes
2014–present	Chicago P.D.	Lieutenant/Captain Kelly Severide	Recurring role; 10 episodes
2015–present	Chicago Med	Lieutenant/Captain Kelly Severide	Recurring role; 8 episodes

=== Music videos ===
Year	Title	Artist	Role	Notes
2011	"You and I"	Lady Gaga	Love Interest	

== Awards and nominations ==
Year	Award	Category	Work	Result
2015	People's Choice Awards	Favorite Dramatic TV Actor	Chicago Fire	Nominated
2016	People's Choice Awards	Favorite Dramatic TV Actor	Chicago Fire	Won
2017	People's Choice Awards	Favorite Dramatic TV Actor	Chicago Fire	Nominated
