= Zach Roerig =

American actor (born 1985)

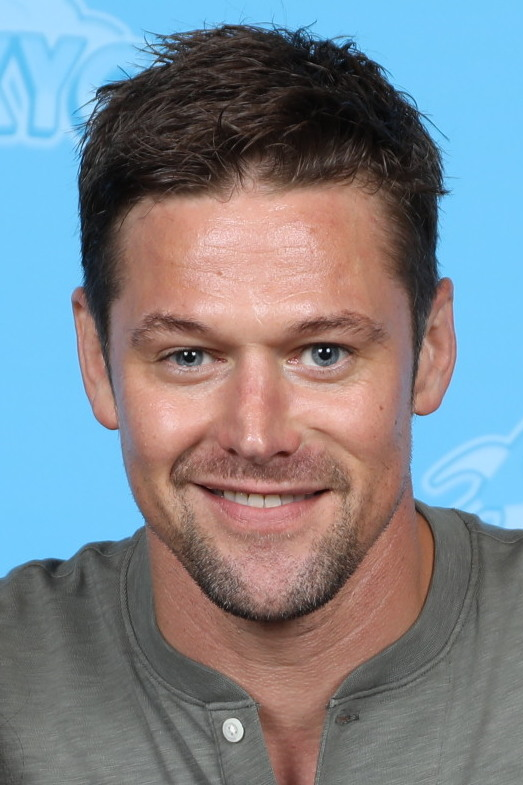
- Roerig in 2023
- Born: Zachary George Roerig; February 22, 1985 (age 41); Montpelier, Ohio, U.S.
- Occupation: Actor
- Years active: 2004–present
- Partner: Arielle Kebbel (2025–2026)
- Children: 1

Zachary George Roerig (/rɔːrɪɡ/; born February 22, 1985) is an American actor. He is known for playing Casey Hughes on As the World Turns (2005-2007), Hunter Atwood on One Life to Live (2007), Cash on Friday Night Lights (2008-2009), Matt Donovan on The Vampire Diaries (2009-2017), and Sergeant Will Mosley on Dare Me (2019-2020).

== Early life ==
Roerig was born in Montpelier, Ohio, to Andrea and Daniel Roerig. He has a younger sister who was born in 1989. Roerig attended the Barbizon Modeling and Acting School in Cleveland and went on to participate in the International Modeling and Talent Association where he signed with his late talent manager. He graduated from Montpelier High School where he was both a football player and a wrestler. While he was growing up, Roerig worked for his father and grandfather at Fackler Monuments making gravestones. Shortly after graduating high school, Roerig moved to New York City to pursue his acting career.

== Career ==
Roerig played the role of Casey Hughes on As the World Turns from January 18, 2005, to May 2, 2007. Casey was the son of legacy couple Tom and Margo Hughes and, during his time, Casey was part of a popular couple with Alexandra Chando. After his departure, Roerig accepted a role on the soap One Life to Live, as Hunter Atwood. He departed again later that year. Roerig then made a few appearances on Friday Night Lights as Cash the cowboy.

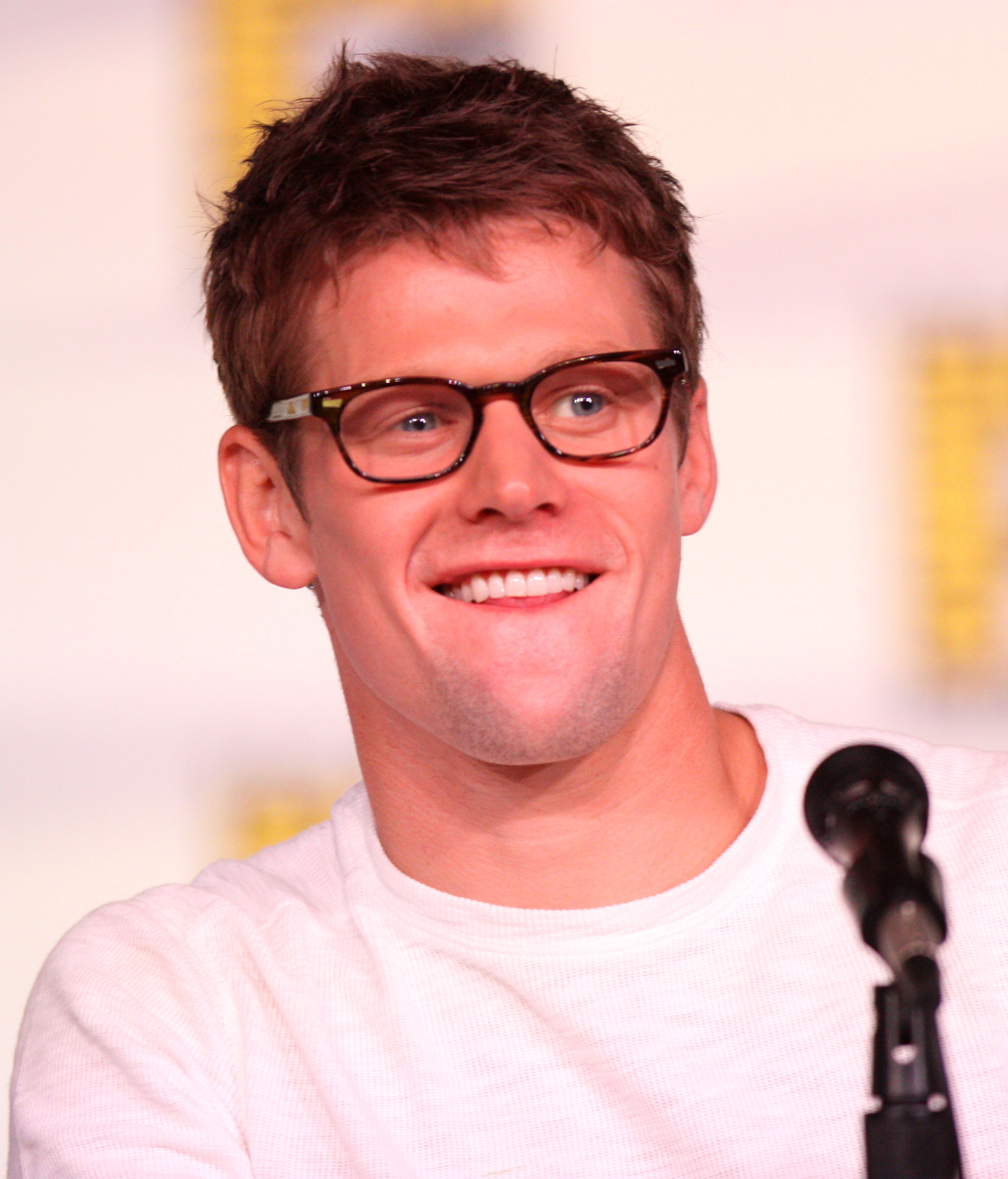
Roerig at the 2012 San Diego Comic-Con

In March 2009, Roerig was cast as Matt Donovan in The CW fantasy supernatural drama The Vampire Diaries, an adaptation of L. J. Smith's novel series of the same name. He was in the show for eight seasons until it ended in 2017. He has also made guest appearances on its spin-offs The Originals and Legacies.

In 2017, Roerig appeared as Pulse (Augustus) in the first season of Fox superhero series The Gifted, a television spin off of the X-Men feature film series. In that same year, he co-starred in the third installment of horror film series The Ring and in the comedy drama The Year of Spectacular Men. Roerig was cast as Ray Mott, a younger version of the character played by Ed Harris in the Vietnam War drama film The Last Full Measure, released in January 2020. He also starred in the USA Network drama pilot Dare Me, which was later picked up to series in 2019. The series is based on Megan Abbott's novel of the same name.

Roerig had joined the cast of the upcoming Netflix comedy drama series Boots as Sergeant Knox, which premiered on October 9, 2025.

== Personal life ==
Roerig has a daughter who was born in January 2011.

In June 2013, Roerig filed legal papers in Georgia, seeking full custody of his daughter after her mother, Roerig's ex-girlfriend Alana Turner, was incarcerated in a federal prison.

On May 24, 2020, he was arrested for driving under the influence in Montpelier, Ohio, and was arraigned on June 4 of the same year.

On April 14, 2025, he announced his relationship with his The Vampire Diaries co-star Arielle Kebbel. They ended their relationship in February 2026.

== Filmography ==
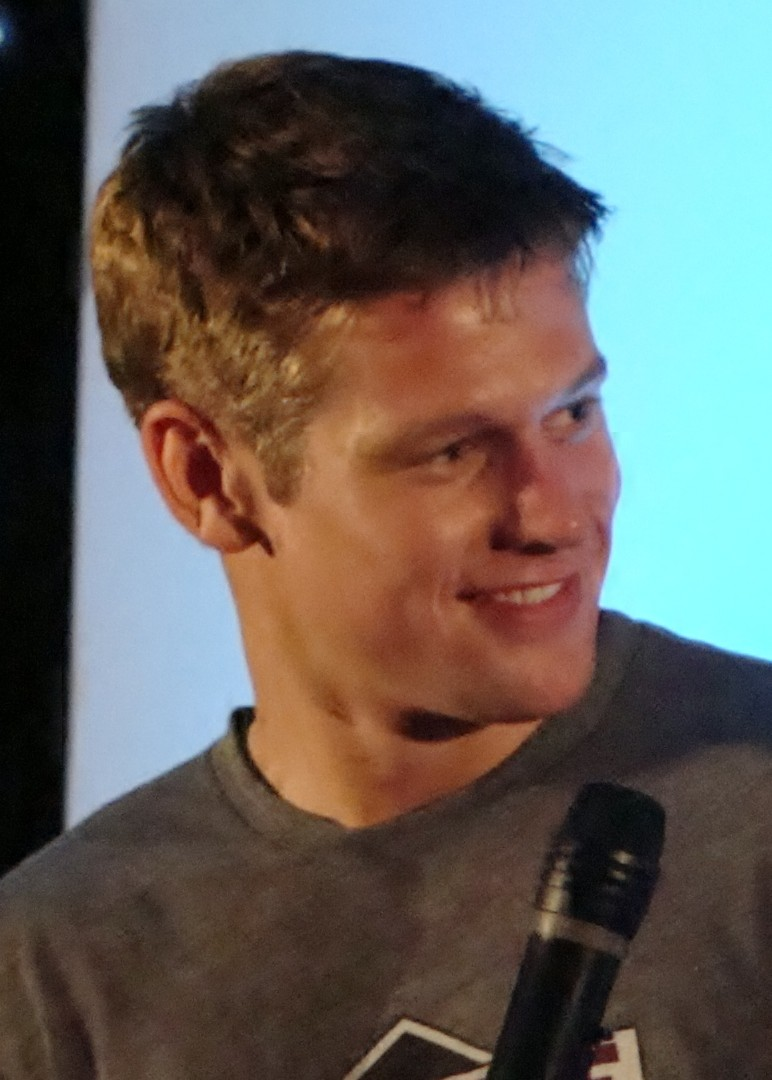
Roerig in 2011

=== Film ===
Year	Title	Role	Notes
2007	Tie a Yellow Ribbon	Teenage Joe	
2008	Assassination of a High School President	Matt Mullen	
2008	Dear Me	Adam	
2014	Field of Lost Shoes	Jack Stanard	
2017	Rings	Carter	
2017	The Year of Spectacular Men	Mikey	
2018	The Outer Wild	Laird	
2019	The Last Full Measure	Young Ray Mott	
2021	A Christmas to Savour	James	
2025	Day of Reckoning	John Dorsey	

=== Television ===
Year	Title	Role	Notes
2004	Law & Order	Rollerblade Messenger	Episode: "All in the Family"
2005–2007	As the World Turns	Casey Hughes	Role held: January 18, 2005 – May 2, 2007
2006	Reba	Man at wedding	Episode: "Two Weddings and a Funeral"
2006	Split Decision	Grady Love	Television film
2007	Guiding Light	Alex	Season 55, episode 154
2007	One Life to Live	Hunter Atwood	15 episodes
2008	The Prince	Taft	Television film
2008–2009	Friday Night Lights	Cash	6 episodes
2009–2017	The Vampire Diaries	Matt Donovan	Main role
2016	The Originals	Matt Donovan	Episode: "Behind the Black Horizon"
2017	The Gifted	Pulse/Gus	2 episodes
2018	Legacies	Matt Donovan	2 episodes
2019	God Friended Me	Aiden	Episode: "Two Guys, a Girl and a Thai Food Place"
2019–2020	Dare Me	Sergeant Will Mosley	Main role
2022	Step Up: High Water		7 episodes
2025	The Waterfront	Troy	1 episode
2025	Boots	Sgt. Knox	2 episodes
