= Death and the Maiden =

Death and the Maiden may refer to:

== Drama ==
- Death and the Maiden (play), by Ariel Dorfman
- Death and the Maiden (film), an adaptation by Roman Polanski
- Prinzessinnendramen: Der Tod und das Mädchen I-V (Princess Dramas: Death and the Maiden I-V), five theatrical plays by Elfriede Jelinek

== Literature ==
- Death and the Maiden, poem by Matthias Claudius, set to music by Schubert
- Death and the Maiden (novel), a 1947 novel by Gladys Mitchell
- "Death and the Maiden", a 1960 short story by Ray Bradbury
- Death and the Maiden, a 1994 novel by P. N. Elrod
- Batman: Death and the Maidens, a graphic novel by Greg Rucka
- Death and the Maiden, a 1939 mystery novel by Q. Patrick
- "Death and the Maiden" was the original title of the early draft of Where Are You Going, Where Have You Been?, a 1966 short story by Joyce Carol Oates

== Music ==
- "Death and the Maiden" (song), composed by Franz Schubert in 1817
- Death and the Maiden Quartet, an 1824 string quartet by Franz Schubert
- Death and the Maiden Ballet, a 1938 ballet by Nikos Skalkottas
- "Death and the Maiden" (Cradle of Filth song), from the 2017 album Cryptoriana – The Seductiveness of Decay
- "Death and the Maiden" (The Verlaines song)
- "Death and the Maiden Retold", a song by The Imagined Village from their self-titled debut album

== Television ==
- "Death and the Maiden" (The Vampire Diaries), an episode of the television series The Vampire Diaries
- "Death and the Maiden", an episode of the television series Foundation.
- "Death and the Maiden", an episode of the television series CSI: Crime Scene Investigation.

== Visual arts ==
- Death and the Maiden (motif), a common motif in Renaissance art
- Death and the Maiden (Baldung), a 1517 painting by Hans Baldung
- Death and the Maiden (Schiele), a 1915 painting by Egon Schiele
- Death and the Maiden, a sketch by Edvard Munch
- Death and the Maiden, a painting by Pierre Puvis de Chavannes
- Death and the Maiden, a 1908 painting by Marianne Stokes

== See also ==
- Egon Schiele: Death and the Maiden, a 2016 Austrian film
- Girl and Death (disambiguation)
