= Dominae =

Studio album by Ejecta
- Released: November 4, 2013
- Recorded: 2012–13; Shout It Out Loud Music, Atomic Heart Studios (New York City); Gary's Electric (Brooklyn, New York); Driftless Studio
- Genre: Synth-pop
- Length: 36:07
- Label: Copyright Control, Driftless Recordings, Happy Death
- Producer: Joel Ford

Ejecta chronology
Dominae (2013)	The Planet (2015)

Singles from Dominae
- 1. "Jeremiah (The Denier)" Released: August 20, 2013; 2. "Afraid of the Dark" Released: September 17, 2013; 3. "It's Only Love" Released: October 10, 2013

Dominae is the debut studio album of American electronic duo Ejecta (now Young Ejecta), consisting of Neon Indian singer Leanne Macomber and producer Joel Ford of Ford & Lopatin. The record consists of ten retro 1980s-style synthpop songs dealing with love, death and early adulthood struggles. Taking seven years to write, it was recorded in New York and Texas, beginning in the summer of 2012 and lasting 14 months, and released on November 4, 2013 by Driftless Recordings, Happy Death and Copyright Control. All the tracks were written by Macomber and produced by Ford, who also did co-writing. Critical reviews were positive upon release, with the record going as so far to rank number six on Gorilla vs. Bear's "40 Best Albums of 2013".

== Production and composition ==
Leanne Macomber was a singer for the Texas electronic music band Neon Indian, and was also in duo called Fight Bite. Joel Ford was in an electronic music duo with Daniel Lopatin, named Ford & Lopatin. The two first met in 2009 when they were touring, and decide to start working on music together, thus forming Ejecta. Macomber wrote all the songs of Dominae, with Joel Ford handling production and co-writing on "It's Only Love" and "Jeremiah". Macomber described the writing process as "the initial vomit. For better or worse I just go with whatever flows out. These songs we're not written as a body of work." She said the oldest-written song from the album was "Mistress", which as of November 2013 was seven years old, and the last was "Tempest", which was finished while wrapping up production.

Recording sessions of Dominae began in the summer of 2012, and lasted 14 months in five different "studios". According to Ford, "We worked in bedrooms, on laptops, in really nice studios, in awesome “project” studios. We used super nice, really expensive gear and really terrible broken equipment—anything that worked at the time. After switching studios and taking a break to do an unrelated session in LA, I lost some files and had to rebuild one of the sessions. I was so heartbroken, but the track ended up sounding amazing and different then we had originally planned."

Dominae is a ten-track retro 1980s-style synthpop album that lasts for a total of 36 minutes and seven seconds. Ejecta said they were influenced by romantic pop ballads, "cheap and glittery one-hit-wonders" and "fringe electronic movements," calling their influences a "schizophrenic combination of your dad's radio and your drunk cousin's record collection—from Gainsbourg to Death in June." They described their sound as electronic musically and Macomber's songwriting as pop. Artists that inspired Ejecta while making the album included Broadcast, OMD, Orbital, Cocteau Twins and the Human League. Ford said their style was "stuffed somewhere between the past and the future".

== Track information ==
Dominae opens with "Mistress", which writer Lee Wakefield of The 405 said it was Macomber's "seductive croon softening a somewhat gloomy declaration." "It's Only Love" is the second song on the album. In the words of The Guardian critic Michael Cragg, it is "Built around a bubbling bassline and swathes of crystalline synth riffs," and "slinks around icily for the verses before unfurling into a dainty but naggingly catchy chorus, Macomber's hushed voice the perfect match for Ford's intricate production." The third track is "Beast", which deals with the rush of getting to know someone, followed by two-minute and 30-second "Inside".

"Afraid of the Dark", the fifth track, is a disco song that Polari Magazine's Andrew Darley said has rising-up warm synths that represent "the sound of someone, broken by love, who is building up strength to protect themselves in future." "Jeremiah (The Denier)" is the sixth song, which Clash writer said had "a sun bleached feel, an atmosphere of late nights on the beach with the sand still warm underfoot." "Eleanor Lye", track eight, deals with the death of a close friend. Earbuddy's Alex Daniel noted that in the chorus, the vocals are "washed in reverb, and while this makes most bands of this ilk sound cheesy, it adds an emotional layer to Ejecta's music that's sometimes missing otherwise." He opined that the chorus made “Eleanor Lye” "an easy highlight of the album." On the ninth song on the record, "Small Town Girl", Macomber sings over an "aggressive drumbeat [...] how she desires to see her former flame six feet under, as she searches for a spot to dig his grave." Dominae closes with "Tempest", which is less driving and a "little bit dreamier" unlike the album's other tracks. Macomber said she and Ford "thought it would be an unusual song for the album, but ultimately I'm glad we kept it." She explained about writing the song: "I had literally just run into my ex-boyfriend or something and was crying the whole time I wrote that song, so it really lends itself to a stark, simple—I'm just very exposed in the song."

== Title ==
When discussing the title Dominae, Macomber described it as "a word that evokes a pleasure pain dichotomy. To my ear it's very pleasant. Submission and power. It comes from a Latin title that was used in early Europe, I believe, for a female lord (a lady, I suppose, though we don't have that kinda thing over here). The lady would naturally refer to herself in the third person in an edict like so: Dominae says no more lute playing on Tuesdays before dinner!"

== Release and promotion ==
Following up to the release of Dominae, three singles came out from the album, which were "Jeremiah (The Denier)", released on August 20, 2013, "Afraid of the Dark" on September 17, 2013, and "It's Only Love" on October 10. On September 18, 2013, it was announced that the album would be released on November 4. It was issued North America by Driftless Recordings, and in the United Kingdom by Happy Death and Copyright Control.

== Critical response ==
Professional ratings
Review scores
Source	Rating
The 405	8/10
Earbuddy	6.8/10
HVV Mag (de)	7/10
Loud and Quiet	4/10
Mojo	3/5 stars
Pitchfork	7/10
Polari Magazine	5/5 stars
PopMatters	7/10
The Skinny	4/5 stars

Dominae was met with mostly positive reviews from critics upon release. It earned a five-star review from Polari Magazine, where writer Andrew Darley, praising the musical and lyrical content, described it as an "accomplished album" where the group "have captured the cruelty and kindness of falling in love." A reviewer for Mojo awarded the album three stars out of five, and called it "a clutch of slow-burning, sweetly-scented '80s synth pop tunes". Earbuddy's Alex Daniel gave a liking review of Dominae, but said that it didn't feel like a dance record nor was it "psychedelic enough to appeal to a trance crowd." He also opined about Macomber's involvement being the main focus of the album, criticizing it for making it seem more like a Leanne Macomber solo project than a collaboration between her and Ford. On the negative side, James West of Loud and Quiet gave Dominae a four out of ten, calling their music "the sort of rubbery synthpop that the Basildon pair pretty much pioneered." He considered it a "sugary re-revival of foppish electro: the same well-versed nostalgia that spawned La Roux and Little Boots in 2009." He also thought that there was a "niggling feeling that nothing on ‘'Dominae’' is ear-worming enough to make them as successful just four years on."

Macomber said about the record's positive reception: "We're really happy with the piece itself. I'm not sure it's healthy to Google yourself too much. I'm ecstatic when people tell me they love it, but it still feels like a miracle that anyone gives the slightest shit about something I made."

== In other media ==
"Afraid of the Dark" was used in "Death and the Maiden", the seventh episode of the fifth season of The Vampire Diaries.

== Track listing ==
All tracks are written by Leanne Macomber.

No.	Title	Length
1.	"Mistress"	3:32
2.	"It's Only Love" (Additional writing by Joel Ford)	3:26
3.	"Beast"	3:31
4.	"Inside"	2:30
5.	"Afraid of the Dark"	4:24
6.	"Jeremiah" (Additional writing by Ford)	3:33
7.	"Silver"	4:41
8.	"Eleanor Lye"	4:37
9.	"Small Town Girl"	3:40
10.	"Tempest"	2:13
Total length:		36:07

== Personnel ==
Credits from liner notes:

- Leanne Macomber – songwriter, vocals
- Joel Ford – songwriter, producer
- Josh Bonati – mastering
- Leonard Greco – artwork photography

== Accolades ==
Publication	Country	Accolade	Year	Rank
Gorilla vs. Bear	United States	40 Best Albums of 2013	2013	6
