= Wally Neuzil =

Austrian nurse and muse

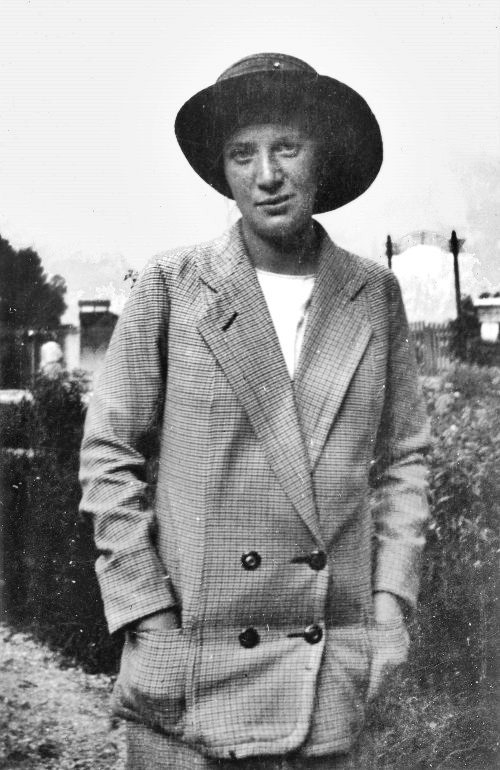
- Neuzil at Lake Traunsee near Gmunden in July 1913 (Wien Museum)
- Born: Walburga Neuzil; 18 August 1894; Tattendorf, Lower Austria, Austria-Hungary
- Died: 25 December 1917 (aged 23); Sinj, Dalmatia, Austria-Hungary
- Occupations: Nurse; Model
- Partner: Egon Schiele (1911–1915)

Walburga "Wally" Neuzil (18 August 1894 – 25 December 1917) was an Austrian nurse who was the lover and muse of the artist Egon Schiele between 1911 and 1915.

== Early life ==
Neuzil was born in Tattendorf, a small village of about 800 people Lower Austria in 1894, the second child of Thekla Pfneisl, a day labourer, and Josef Neuzil, an elementary school teacher. Thekla and Josef married in March 1895, and had three more daughters (Berta, Antonia and Mari) before Josef's death at a hospital in Mödling in 1902 (1905 in some sources). After her husband's death, Thekla had two more children, sons named Johann and Ernst.

In 1906, Thekla and her five daughters (Wally had an older sister named Anna) relocated to Vienna, some 30 kilometres to the north of Tattendorf. Neuzil's mother derived a small pension because of her status as a widow of a government official, but this was barely enough to meet the needs of her family and records indicate that they had a peripatetic existence living in the poorer parts of Vienna. In contemporary records, Neuzil is registered variously as a sales assistant, cashier, or storefront model. It was rumored that she was a prostitute because she worked as an artist's model.

== Relationship with Egon Schiele ==
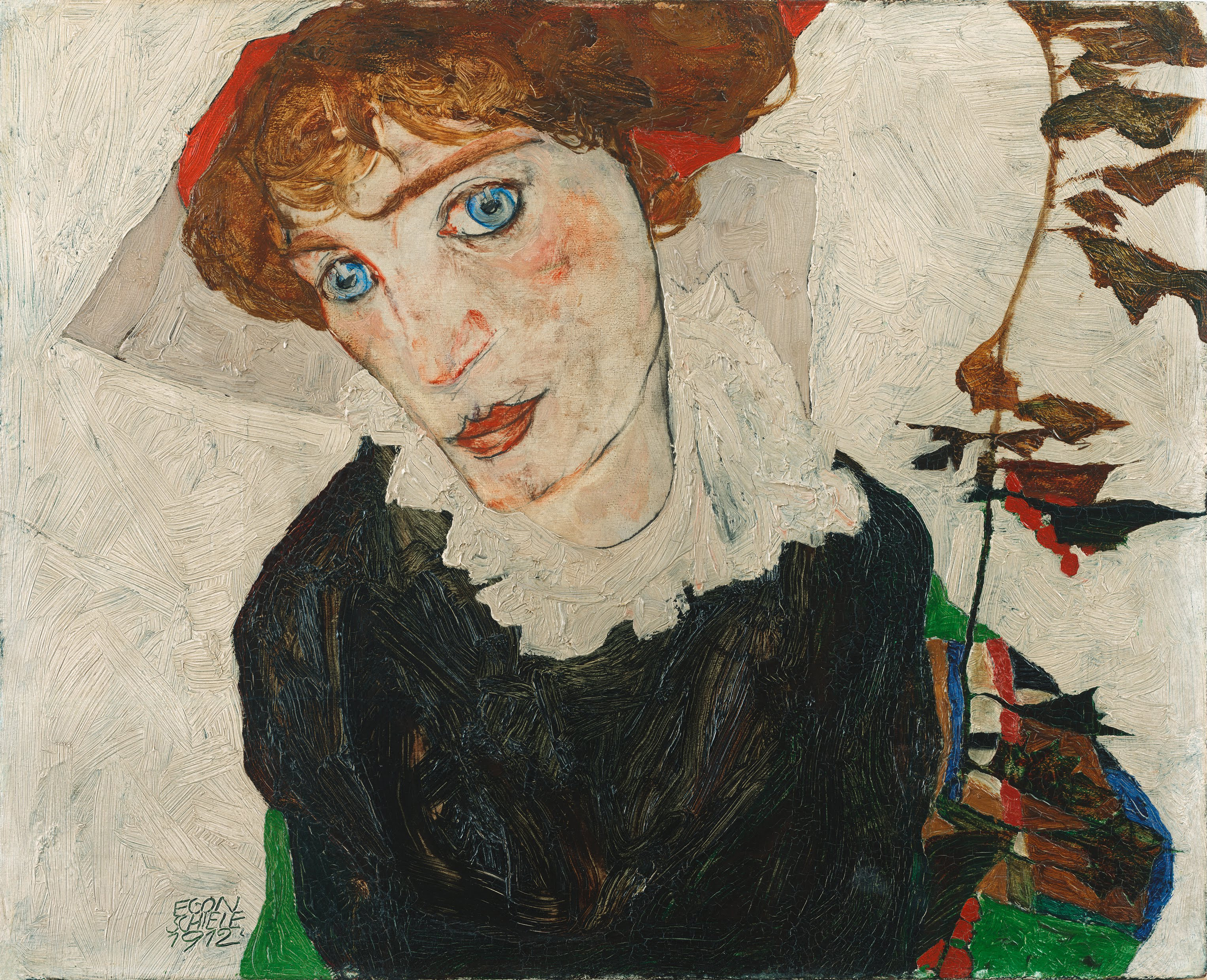
Portrait of Wally (1912)

Neuzil met the Austrian artist Egon Schiele in 1911; she was 17 and he was 21. The circumstances under which they met are unknown, although it has been suggested that they were introduced by Klimt, of whom Schiele was a protégé and Neuzil was a model. According to Wally Neuzil Society, it is somehow a common myth that the painter Gustav Klimt 'donated' his model Wally to Schiele: Klimt did not work with young models at this time and there is no work by Klimt known showing Wally Neuzil.

Schiele and Neuzil became lovers, and Neuzil soon moved into Schiele's Vienna home, and over the next four years modelled regularly for his paintings; they were also lovers for much of this period. Neuzil featured in several of Schiele's most well-known paintings, including Portrait of Wally (1912), Wally Neuzil in Black Stockings (1912), and Wally in Red Blouse with Raised Knees (1913).

After struggling to fit into Viennese society, Neuzil and Schiele moved to his mother's hometown of Krumau (now Český Krumlov) in Bohemia. However, their lifestyle choices, including their unmarried status and Schiele's alleged employment of local girls as models, led to criticism from locals and the couple soon moving to Neulengbach, near Vienna, in 1912.

Low on money while living in Neulengbach and with Schiele unable to buy paint and canvas, Wally was dispatched by train to Vienna to try and sell Schiele's paintings to art collectors.Many of these paintings featured Wally as a subject in suggestive poses, hence it has been theorized the reason Schiele asked Wally to sell them instead of himself was that that male buyers would find it tiltillating to see the model and be more inclined to buy the art.

While living in Neulengbach Schiele was dogged by similar rumours as in Krumau, and was arrested for seducing a twelve-year-old girl; while this charge was dropped, Schiele was charged with exhibiting erotic art in a place accessible to children. Schiele wrote how Neuzil was the only one of his friends and acquaintances who continued to offer him support during the twenty-four days he spent in prison.

In 1914, Schiele set up a studio in Hietzing in Vienna's suburbs, where he first met the sisters Edith and Adéle Harms.

Around this time, Schiele wrote in a letter to Arthur Roessler that he was "planning to marry, advantageously, not Wally" ("habe vor zu heiraten, günstigst, nicht Wally"). In 1915, Schiele became engaged to Edith, and informed Neuzil of his intentions at the Café Eichberger. Evidence at the time suggested Schiele intended to carry on some relationship with Neuzil despite his marriage; a letter he wrote to Neuzil mentioned them continuing to holiday together without Edith. However, Neuzil ended the relationship immediately after Schiele announced his engagement, and the two did not see each other again, although a letter by an acquaintance of both Neuzil and Schiele suggested he continued to offer her some financial support as late as 1915. After Neuzil's departure, Schiele painted Death and the Maiden in response to the end of their relationship.

== Later life ==
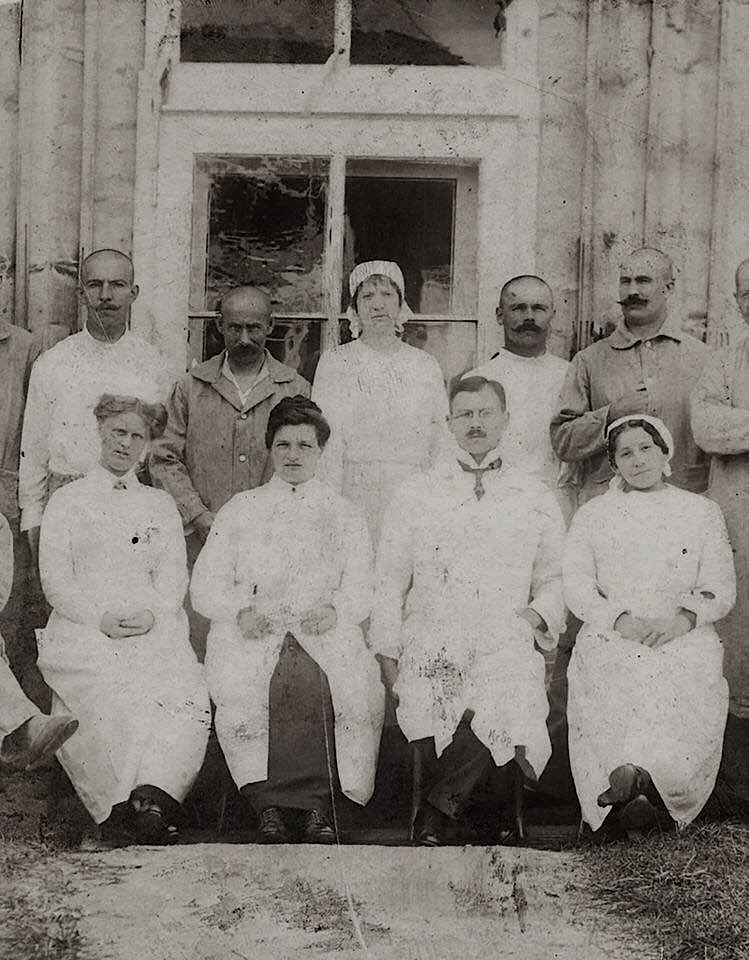
Neuzil in Sinj during WWI (back row in the middle)

Following the end of her relationship with Schiele, Neuzil trained as a nurse and found employment in various military hospitals in Vienna. By 1917, she was working in Sinj in Dalmatia, where she died of scarlet fever on 25 December 1917 at the age of 23.

Neuzil was buried at St. Francis Cemetery (Croatian: Groblje Sv. Frane) on December 27, 1917, alongside an Austrian officer named Franz Schön who had died in 1914.

== Legacy ==
Schiele died in 1918 during the Spanish flu pandemic, three days after the death of his wife Edith and their unborn child.

In 1978 director Clive Donner cast David Bowie and Charlotte Rampling in a film to be called Wally, centered around Schiele and his relationship with Neuzil, however due to absence of funding the project never materialized.

Portrait of Wally is currently on display at the Leopold Museum in Vienna. It was subject to a protracted legal battle in 1998 following its display on loan in the US after The New York Times reported that the painting had been improperly acquired by the museum via Nazi looting of Jewish-owned art during the Holocaust. In 2010, the Leopold Museum reached a $19 million settlement with the family of Lea Bondi Jaray, an art dealer who had originally owned the painting before being forced to sell it and flee Austria in 1939 following the Anschluss and subsequent Aryanisation of Austria.

In 2017, Neuzil's grave was located in Sinj. In Neuzil's hometown of Tattendorf, a square is named after her. The same year the Wally Neuzil Society was founded in Cambridge who has as its stated purpose to carry out research on Neuzil and to maintain her grave in Sinj.

== In popular culture ==
In 1980, Excess and Punishment, a biographical film about Schiele, was released. In it, Neuzil was portrayed by Jane Birkin.

A fictionalized version of Wally, and her relationships with Egon Schiele and Gustav Klimt, is prominently featured in the novel Anima Rising by Christopher Moore.
