= Mini-LP =

Short vinyl record album or LP

A mini-LP or mini-album is a short record album or LP, usually retailing at a lower price than an album that would be considered full-length. It is distinct from an EP due to containing more tracks and a slightly longer running length. A mini-LP is not to be confused with the Japanese CDs issued in a "mini LP sleeve" or "paper jacket".

Its running time is shorter than the typical album but longer than a single album. It is sometimes synonymous with extended play, especially in East Asia music market. However, some music distributors may classify mini albums with 7 or more songs as an album. In the United States, The Recording Academy's rules for Grammy Awards state that an album must comprise a minimum total playing time of 15 minutes with at least five distinct tracks or a minimum total playing time of 30 minutes with no minimum track requirement. In the United Kingdom, the criteria for the UK Albums Chart is that a recording counts as an "album" if it either has more than four tracks or lasts more than 25 minutes.

== East Asia music market ==
In South Korea, a mini album (Korean: 미니앨범) is a promotional term for a release that has a longer running time and more tracks than a single album but is shorter than a "full album" (정규앨범), also known as a studio album. A mini album can also be called an EP. In some instances, a mini album is also called a full album, although it only has 6 or 7 tracks. An example would be Face by Jimin. This also applies to Japanese releases by South Korean artists.

In some cases, artists have used the chronological placement of a mini album in their discography as part of the title of the release. For example, 2NE1 1st Mini Album and Strawberry Milk's The 1st Mini Album.

== History ==
Mini-LPs became popular in the early 1980s with record companies targeting consumers who were reluctant to buy full-length and full-priced albums. Several mini-LPs had been released in the late 1970s, including John Cooper Clarke's Walking Back to Happiness, which used the 10-inch format. The format was usually 12-inch or 10-inch vinyl, with a playing time of between twenty and thirty minutes, and around seven tracks. They were often used as a way of introducing new acts to the market or as a way of releasing interim albums by established acts between their main albums. Epic Records introduced the 10-inch Nu-Disk format in the early 1980s (an example being Cheap Trick's 1980 release Found All the Parts), but they found it difficult to merchandise, and 12-inch mini-LPs became more common. Notable mini-LPs of the early 1980s included U2's Under a Blood Red Sky, which reached number 2 on the UK Albums Chart in 1983, and The Honeydrippers' Volume 1, which reached number 4 on the Billboard 200 in 1984.

Independent record labels often released mini-LPs by artists before releasing full-length albums. In 1987, 4AD took this approach with both Pixies debut Come on Pilgrim and the second album by Throwing Muses, The Fat Skier.

In 1997, Aphex Twin released the Come to Daddy EP, which he considers to be an album/mini-album rather than an EP. It reached number 37 on the US Billboard Heatseekers Albums chart.

In 2018, Kanye West spearheaded an effort to release five mini-albums from five different artists in five weeks. He led the release of Daytona by Pusha T, Ye by Kanye West, Kids See Ghosts by Kids See Ghosts (a project consisting of Kanye West and Kid Cudi), Nasir by Nas and K.T.S.E. by Teyana Taylor.

Other examples include King Crimson's Vrooom (1994), Robyn's Body Talk Pt. 1 and Pt. 2 (2010), Young Ejecta's The Planet (2015) and Yes' From a Page (2019), with more recent examples including Itzy's Born to Be (2024), Hannah Grae's Hell Is a Teenage Girl (2023) and Nothing Lasts Forever (2024), and Exotic Birds of Prey by Shabazz Palaces (2024).
