= Gerhard Rodax =

Austrian footballer (1965–2022)

Personal information
- Date of birth: 29 August 1965
- Place of birth: Tattendorf, Austria
- Date of death: 16 November 2022 (aged 57)
- Place of death: near Traiskirchen, Austria
- Height: 1.81 m (5 ft 11 in)
- Position: Striker

Senior career*
| Years | Team | Apps | (Gls) |
| 1983–1990 | Admira Wacker | 192 | (85) |
| 1990–1991 | Atlético de Madrid | 27 | (9) |
| 1992–1993 | Rapid Wien | 43 | (12) |
| 1995–1996 | Admira Wacker | 11 | (0) |
| Total | | 273 | (106) |

International career
| 1985–1991 | Austria | 20 | (3) |
- * Club domestic league appearances and goals

Gerhard Rodax (29 August 1965 – 16 November 2022) was an Austrian professional footballer who played as a striker.

== Club career ==
Rodax was born in Tattendorf. He started his professional career at Admira Wacker and stayed with them for seven years, becoming Austrian Football Bundesliga top goalscorer in 1990. That earned him a contract at Spanish side Atlético Madrid, but he lasted just over one season with them and returned to Austria to join Rapid Wien where he finished his career in 1993 at 28 years of age. In the 1995–96 season he made a short comeback at Admira.

== International career ==
Rodax made his debut for Austria in 1985 and was a participant at the 1990 FIFA World Cup, where he scored in the 2–1 win over the USA in Florence.

Rodax won 20 international caps, scoring three goals. His last international was a May 1991 friendly match against Sweden.

== Death ==
Rodax died near Traiskirchen on 16 November 2022, at the age of 57.

== Career statistics ==
Scores and results list Austria's goal tally first, score column indicates score after each Rodax goal.

List of international goals scored by Gerhard Rodax
| No. | Date | Venue | Opponent | Score | Result | Competition | Ref. |
|---|---|---|---|---|---|---|---|
| 1 | 4 October 1989 | Ta' Qali National Stadium, Ta' Qali, Malta | Malta | 2–1 | 2–1 | Friendly | |
| 2 | 28 March 1990 | La Rosaleda Stadium, Málaga, Spain | Spain | 3–2 | 3–2 | Friendly | |
| 3 | 19 June 1990 | Stadio Comunale, Florence, Italy | United States | 2–0 | 2–1 | 1990 FIFA World Cup | |

== Honours ==
Atlético Madrid

- Copa del Rey: 1991

Individual

- Austrian Football Bundesliga top scorer: 1990
