= Girl and Death =

Girl and Death may refer to:

- A Girl and Death, 1892 fantasy poem by Maxim Gorky
- "A Girl and Death", 1986 ballet by Mikael Tariverdiev based on Gorky's poem
- The Girl and Death, 2012 Dutch film directed by Jos Stelling
- "A Girl and Death", the third episode from Three Stories (1997 film)

== See also ==
- Death and the Maiden (disambiguation)
