= The Planet (album) =

Studio album (mini-album) by Young Ejecta
- Released: January 27, 2015
- Recorded: 2014
- Genre: Synth-pop
- Length: 24:04
- Label: Driftless Recordings
- Producer: Joel Ford

Young Ejecta chronology
Dominae (2013)	The Planet (2015)	Ride Lonesome (2020)

Singles from The Planet
- 1. "Welcome to Love" Released: November 4, 2014; 2. "Your Planet" Released: November 24, 2014; 3. "Into Your Heart" Released: January 6, 2015

The Planet is the first mini-album by American synthpop duo Young Ejecta (Leanne Macomber and Joel Ford). The second overall studio album by the group and the first to be released under Young Ejecta, which had been changed from simply Ejecta due to a conflict with another DJ named Ejeca, the six-track record contains influences of minimalist electronic music, euro disco and 1970s pop music. On October 8, 2014, the band announced they had finished producing the album. Three singles spawned from the record: "Welcome to Love", "Your Planet" and "Into Your Heart". “Welcome to Love” was used in the closing credits scene of season 7 episode 10 of Orange Is The New Black.

== Critical reception ==
Professional ratings
Aggregate scores
Source	Rating
Metacritic	77/100
Review scores
Source	Rating
The 405	7.5/10
Allmusic	4/5 stars
Earbuddy	7.5/10
Exclaim!	8/10
Paste	7.2/10
Pitchfork Media	6.5/10
Popmatters	5/10 stars
Under the Radar	8/10 stars

Reviews of The Planet' were favorable. Andrew Darley of The 405 said that Young Ejecta achieved in proving they had an "ability in producing emotionally intelligent pop music with a knowing sense of enchanting melodies". Exclaim! Scott Simpson scored the album an eight of ten, writing that it "works more than well enough as its own insular world, and is hopefully but a taste of more to come (Driftless)". SLUG Magazine writer Allison Shephard called The Planet "good for those who aren’t ready for the full-on interstellar adventure and experienced explorers alike", while Fast Forward Weekly critic Brock Thiessen described it as "hardly a big, bold addition to the world of electro-pop, but it is a pleasant one, further cementing Young Ejecta as a unique project worth both your time and attention." However, in a more mixed review published in Popmatters, Colin Fitzgerald criticized The Planet for being "too morose and humorless to be really good pop music, and too upbeat and cheap to be taken very seriously."

== Track listing ==
1. "Into Your Heart" 3:47
2. "Welcome to Love" 4:22
3. "All Day" 2:47
4. "Recluse" 5:36
5. "Your Planet" 4:17
6. "What You Done" 3:15
