= Egon Schiele – Exzess und Bestrafung =

1980 Austrian drama film

- Directed by: Herbert Vesely
- Screenplay by: Herbert Vesely
- Produced by: Robert Russ; Dieter Geissler
- Starring: Mathieu Carrière; Jane Birkin; Christine Kaufmann; Kristina van Eyck
- Music by: Brian Eno; Felix Mendelssohn
- Distributed by: CineVox
- Release date: October 28, 1980 (Austria)
- Running time: 123 minutes
- Countries: West Germany; France; Austria
- Languages: German; English; French

Egon Schiele – Exzess und Bestrafung, also known as Egon Schiele – Excess and Punishment (English) and Egon Schiele, enfer et passion (French) is a 1980 film based on the life of the Austrian artist Egon Schiele. Set in Austria during the years immediately prior to and during World War I, the film stars Mathieu Carrière as Schiele, with Jane Birkin as his muse Walburga (Wally) Neuzil, Christine Kaufmann as his wife Edith, and Kristina van Eyck as Edith's sister. Essentially a depiction of obsession and its constituents of sex, alcohol, and uncontrolled emotions, the film portrays Schiele as an agent of social change leading to the destruction of those he loves and ultimately of himself.

== Plot ==
The short life of Austrian Expressionist painter Egon Schiele is chronicled against a backdrop of the final years of the Habsburg Monarchy. The story begins around 1912 as Schiele (Mathieu Carriere) and his mistress and artistic muse Wally (Jane Birkin) are befriended by an obsessed teenage girl (Karina Fallenstein), who has run away to be with Schiele. Schiele is subsequently imprisoned on the grounds that he has behaved in a sexually improper way towards the young woman. The young woman falsely accuses Schiele, who denies the charge to no avail. Although the girl withdraws her accusations, Schiele is nevertheless requested to leave the area, as he has offended the social mores of the conservative society in which he lives. Those offended include his mother (Angelika Hauff), who rails against his lax morals.

Upon his release, he continues his excesses, despite fighting (literally) to conform, even going so far as to volunteer for service in the Austrian army during World War I. As a soldier, Schiele cuts a pathetic figure and is quickly discharged as unfit for duty. He disposes of his alcoholic mistress and has an affair with a society beauty, who ultimately abandons him, unable to cope with his sexual obsessions. Schiele's emotional cruelty is exposed when he shuns Wally, who is near death. Their parting scene at a Vienna social gathering reveals the corruption at the heart of Schiele's artistic soul.

Schiele's paintings, however, develop greater depth as he pushes himself to the limit. Whilst his paintings gain acceptance (and many now hang in the Leopold Museum in Vienna), his own sanity suffers. He marries and appears to find a modicum of contentment until his wife Edith (Christine Kaufmann) falls ill during the 1918 Spanish influenza pandemic. Schiele has sex with his dying wife in a scene that is tender yet shocking, evoking a central theme of Schiele's work: the link between sex and death. Shortly thereafter, Schiele himself contracts influenza and dies.

== Production ==
The film was an international co-production with actors of German, French, Dutch, and English origin. Shot on location in Vienna and the Croatian capital city of Zagreb, it was directed by Herbert Vesely and produced by Dieter Geissler and Robert Hess, with cinematography by Rudolf Blahacek and soundtrack by Brian Eno. Although selected as the Austrian entry for the Best Foreign Language Film at the 53rd Academy Awards, it was not accepted as a nominee.

== Cast ==
- Mathieu Carrière – Egon Schiele
- Jane Birkin – Wally Neuzil
- Christine Kaufmann – Edith Harms
- Kristina van Eyck – Adele Harms
- Karina Fallenstein – Tatjana von Mossig
- Ramona Leiß – Gerti
- Marcel Ophüls – Dr Stovel
- Robert Dietl – Benesch
- Danny Mann – Mrs Stovel
- Guido Wieland – Herr von Mossig
- Maria Ebner – Frau Harms
- Angelika Hauff – Frau Gertrude Schiele, Schiele's mother
- Helmut Dohle – Gustav Klimt
- Wolfgang Leisowsky – Arthur Roessler
- Harry Hardt – Mr. von Reininghaus
- Serge Gainsbourg – Unnamed

== Reviews ==
- New York Times review

== See also ==
- List of submissions to the 53rd Academy Awards for Best Foreign Language Film
- List of Austrian submissions for the Academy Award for Best Foreign Language Film
- Egon Schiele: Death and the Maiden (2016)
