= Dead Man on Campus (The Vampire Diaries) =

- The Vampire Diaries episode
- Episode no.: Season 5 Episode 8
- Directed by: Rob Hardy
- Written by: Brian Young; Neil Reynolds
- Production code: 2J7508
- Original air date: November 21, 2013

Guest appearances
- Olga Fonda as Nadia; Rick Cosnett as Professor Wes Maxfield; Kendrick Sampson as Jesse; Shaun Sipos Aaron

Episode chronology
← Previous "Death and the Maiden"	Next → "The Cell"
- The Vampire Diaries season 5

"Dead Man on Campus" is the eighth episode of the fifth season of the American series The Vampire Diaries and the series' 97th episode overall. "Dead Man on Campus" was originally aired on November 21, 2013, on The CW. The episode was written by Brian Young and Neil Reynolds and directed by Rob Hardy.

== Plot ==
Elena (Nina Dobrev) and Caroline (Candice Accola) plan a welcome back party for Bonnie (Kat Graham). Bonnie still hasn't told anyone what being an anchor means and she tries to hide the fact that every supernatural being has to pass through her when they die. Elena wants to invite Damon (Ian Somerhalder) and Stefan (Paul Wesley) to the party despite Caroline's wish for Damon not to come and Stefan not being in the mood to party after getting his memories back.

Wes (Rick Cosnett) continues his experiments on Jesse (Kendrick Sampson) who is now a vampire. Wes transfuses him blood but while he does it, Jesse breaks his shackles and attacks Wes. Jesse does not understand what is going on, so he locks up Wes at his laboratory and goes back to his apartment where he calls Caroline for help. Caroline gets there in time to stop Jesse from killing Aaron (Shaun Sipos) who had just entered his room and was asking him what happened and who made him a vampire.

During the party, Elena sends Damon to find out why Wes is doing these experiments despite Caroline's fears that Damon will kill Wes. Damon injects Wes with different deadly viruses to make him talk and Wes finally admits that he is trying to make a new kind of vampire that will not be a threat to humans because they will crave vampire blood instead of human blood. At the same time, at the party Jesse bites Caroline and then leaves to ask Wes what he did to him.

When Jesse arrives at the laboratory he attacks Damon. Damon cannot escape but Elena arrives and kills Jesse before he kills Damon. Caroline is upset with what Elena did even though Elena explains to Caroline that she could not have done anything else since Jesse was bent on killing Damon. After this, Elena and Caroline return to their room and Damon stays behind to deal with Wes.

In the meantime, back at Mystic Falls, Stefan is at the bar drinking and trying to forget his traumatic memories of being locked in the safe, drowning over and over, while Katherine is in conversation with Matt (Zach Roerig). Matt tells her about the spirit that is inside him and he asks her to translate what the spirit said on the video Matt secretly made. Katherine recognizes the knife Matt has and agrees to help him. She calls Nadia (Olga Fonda) for help and she also asks Stefan for his.

Nadia arrives asking why Katherine called her and Katherine explains she needs her help to summon the spirit inside Matt. Nadia does so and Katherine asks why he is in Mystic Falls. The spirit of Gregor says that he is there because he wants to kill Silas but since Silas is already dead Katherine insists that he tell her the real reason and she also shows him that she has the knife. Gregor finally admits that his orders are to kill Katherine. Upon hearing this, Katherine stabs Matt's body with the knife. Stefan worries about Matt but Katherine reassures him that Matt will be totally fine; Gregor on the other hand, not so much since the knife is the only thing that can truly kill a traveler.

When everything with Gregor is over, Stefan has a new series of flashbacks and Katherine helps him deal with them. She manages to help and Stefan is calm again. Later, he finds a note from Katherine addressed to Nadia telling her that she is going to kill herself since she cannot fight her new enemy: time. Katherine leaps from the top of the clock tower, but Stefan arrives in time and catches her, saving her from death.

Meanwhile, Bonnie can no longer hide what is happening to her when she doubles over screaming in front of Jeremy (Steven R. McQueen) because a deceased supernatural spirit passes through her to the other side. He asks her what is going on and she tells him the truth. Jeremy is annoyed that she did not tell him the moment she knew, but she assures him that everything is OK since the pain is worth being with him.

At the end of the episode, Damon finds a pack of blood on Wes' laboratory fridge with the number 12144 on it. He asks Wes about it and when Wes asks why he cares, Damon reveals that he was number 21051 once. Wes realizes that Damon was an Augustine vampire and when Damon hears the name he remembers things from his past. He says that he thought the "Augustine vampire project" was shut down 60 years ago and despite the promise he gave to Elena not to kill Wes, he decides to kill him. Wes manages to free himself and before Damon gets him, he pushes the emergency button which pours vervain from the fire sprinklers causing Damon to faint.

Damon wakes up in a prison cell and it seems he was there before as there are marks with his initials on the wall.

== Featured music ==
In the "Dead Man on Campus" episode we can hear the songs:

- "My My Love" by Joshua Radin
- "The Other Side" by David Gray
- "All Night" by Icona Pop
- "Come a Little Closer" by Cage the Elephant
- "The Night Out" by Martin Solveig
- "Bad Intentions" by Digital Daggers
- "Harlem" by New Politics

== Reception ==
=== Ratings ===
In its original American broadcast, "Dead Man on Campus" was watched by 2.67 million; slightly down by 0.05 from the previous episode.

=== Reviews ===
"Dead Man on Campus" received generally positive reviews.

Carrie Raisler from The A.V. Club gave the episode a B rate saying that the episode was pretty strong and also Damon's spotlight. "Sometimes a show has a breakout character, a character who immediately jumps off the screen and, by a combination of performance, writing, and sheer force of the actor’s will, becomes something of an unexpected sensation. [...] For The Vampire Diaries, that character is Damon Salvatore." For the new storyline she stated: "It’s clear Dr. Wes Maxfield and his Augustine vampire factory of doom is the next big story in the queue, and although this doesn’t feel like a very original direction for the show to take, I am, nevertheless, on board with the series taking it."

Stephanie Flasher from TV After Dark gave an A− rate to the episode saying that "for the most part, it was a good episode".

Leigh Raines of TV Fanatic rated the episode with 3.5/5. "While this was not the most exciting hour of The Vampire Diaries, it served as a turning point to the next major storyline in a number of ways."

Stephanie Hall of KSiteTV gave a good review to the episode saying: "How do you top last week's episode that generally succeeded as the quarter season finale? You go in a completely new direction. And that's exactly what "Dead Man On Campus" did." She stated that Damon had two interesting storylines on the episode and the second one was "a shocking twist because it came out of nowhere."

Rebecca Serle from Vulture rate the episode with 4/5 saying: "Last night was my favorite kind of TVD episode. It was fun (parties! booze! making out!) but it also had a lot of depth and heart. [...] What I’m really loving about this season is that we’re getting the chance to see real emotional consequences. So much has happened to our gang that at this point they all have post-traumatic stress disorder."

Molly Freeman from TV and Film Review said that the episode was "particularly good" but she thought that the Damon storyline about him being an Augustine vampire "was not well delivered".

Despite the positive reviews, Tyler Olson of Crimson Fear rated the episode with 2/5 saying: "I was so hoping that this Augustine group would have been something unique and evil, but instead it is just a copy of another series' work" and "The only decent thing in the entire episode was Katherine, Stefan, and Matt working together, but it wasn't even that exciting."
