= Hans Schwarz (sculptor) =

German sculptor and medallist

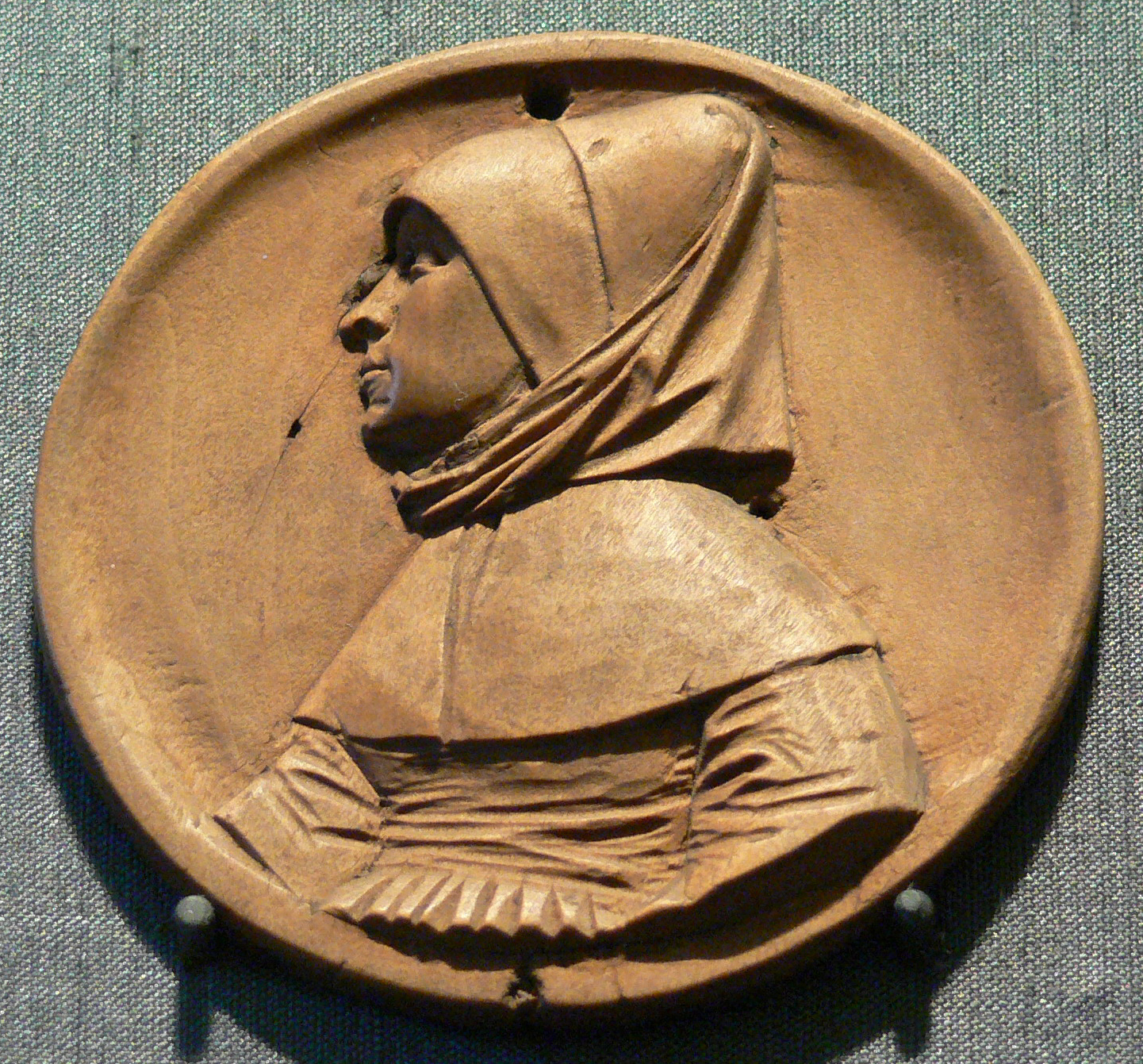
Portrait of an unknown woman, medallion model made of wood, 1520

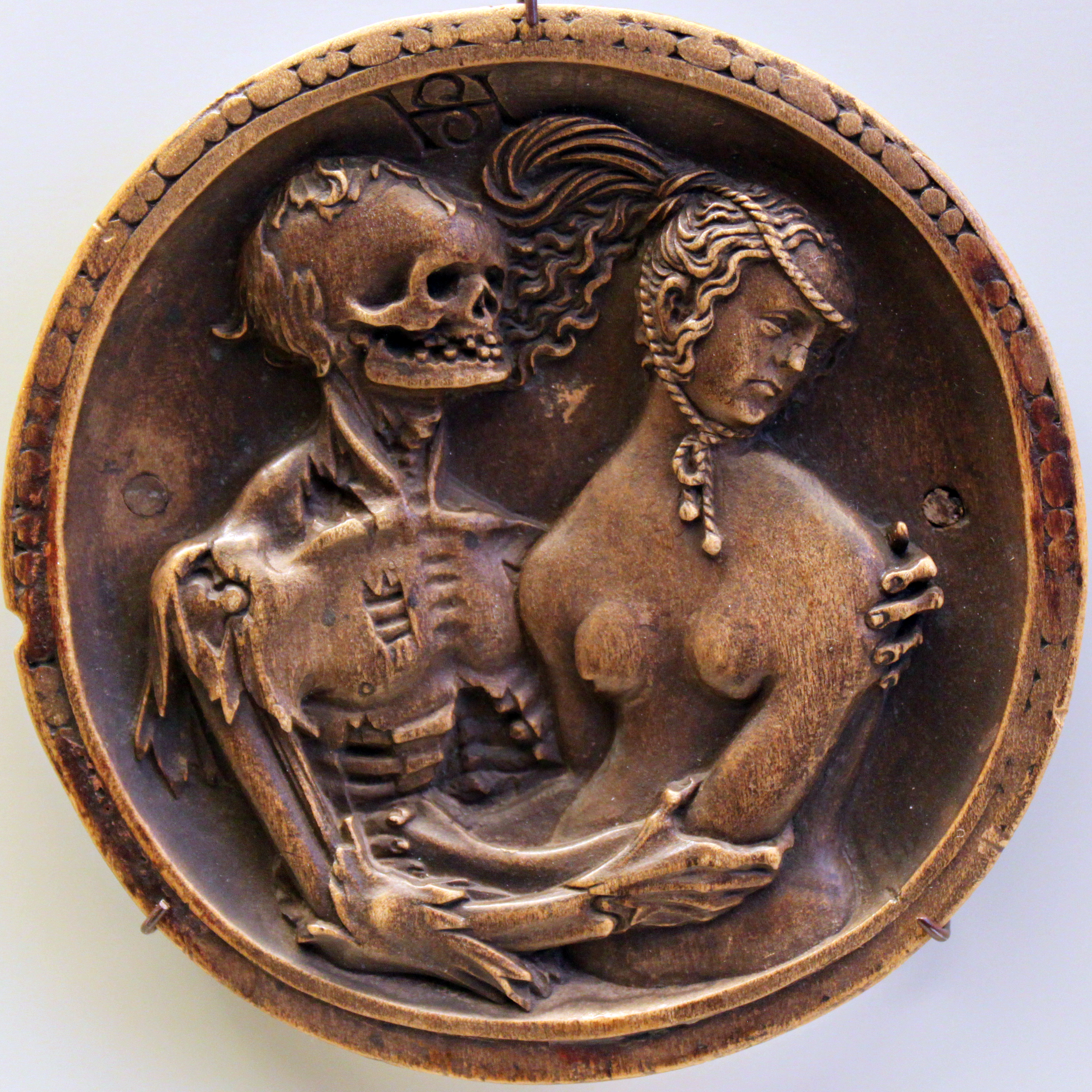
Death and the Maiden, boxwood carving, c. 1520

Hans Schwarz (1492 – after 1521), was a German sculptor and medallist.

== Biography ==
He was born in Augsburg, Germany and according to the RKD he died around 1532. He is known for crafting medals and medallions.
