= Henri-Léopold Lévy =

French painter

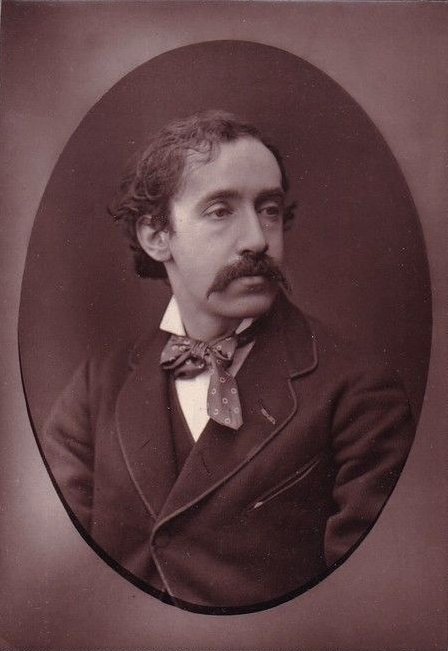
Henri-Léopold Lévy, photograph by Nadar

Henri-Léopold Lévy (23 September 1840, Nancy - 29 December 1904, Paris) was a French painter of Jewish ancestry, known primarily for mythological and Biblical subjects.

== Biography ==
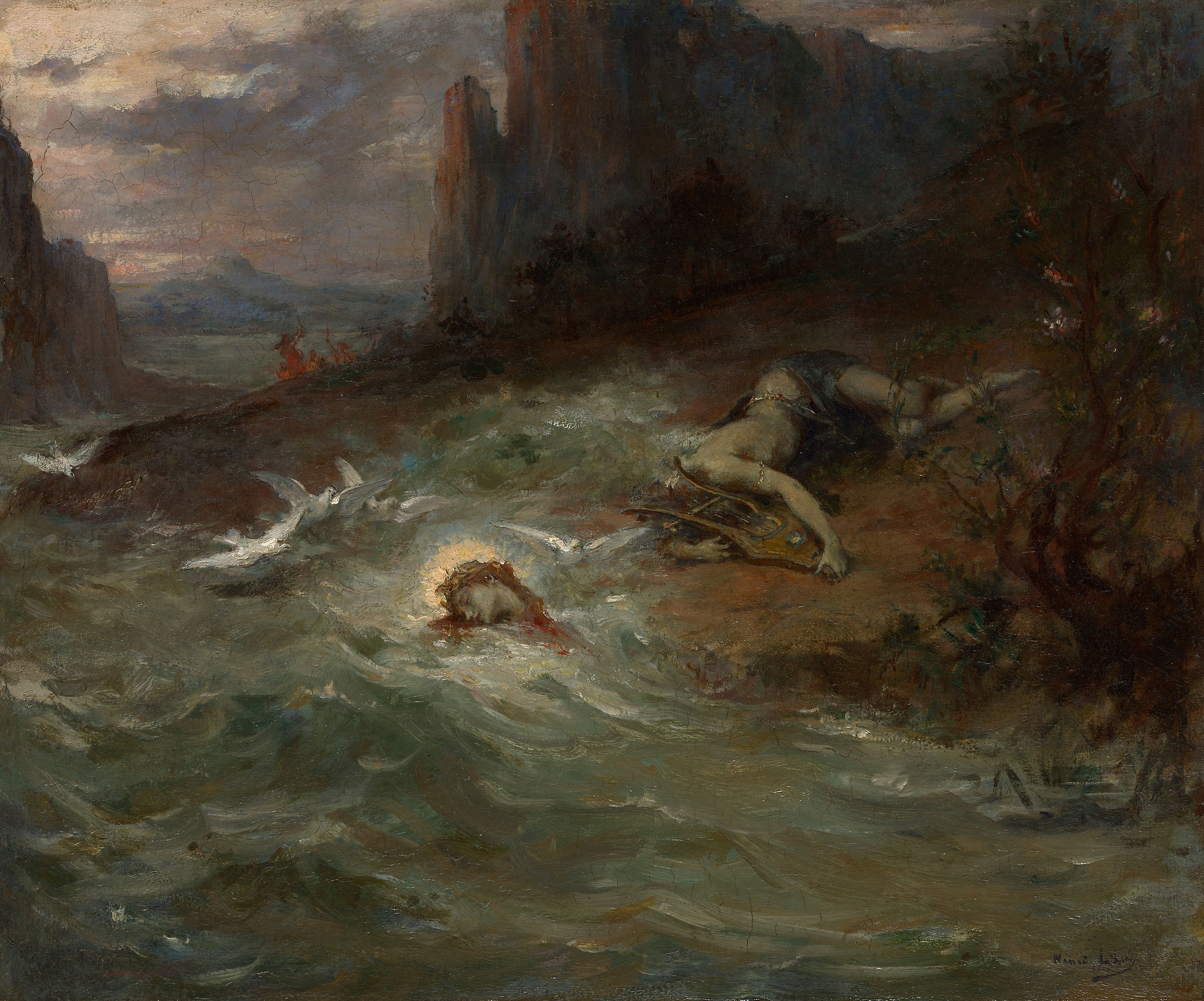
The Death of Orpheus, c. 1870

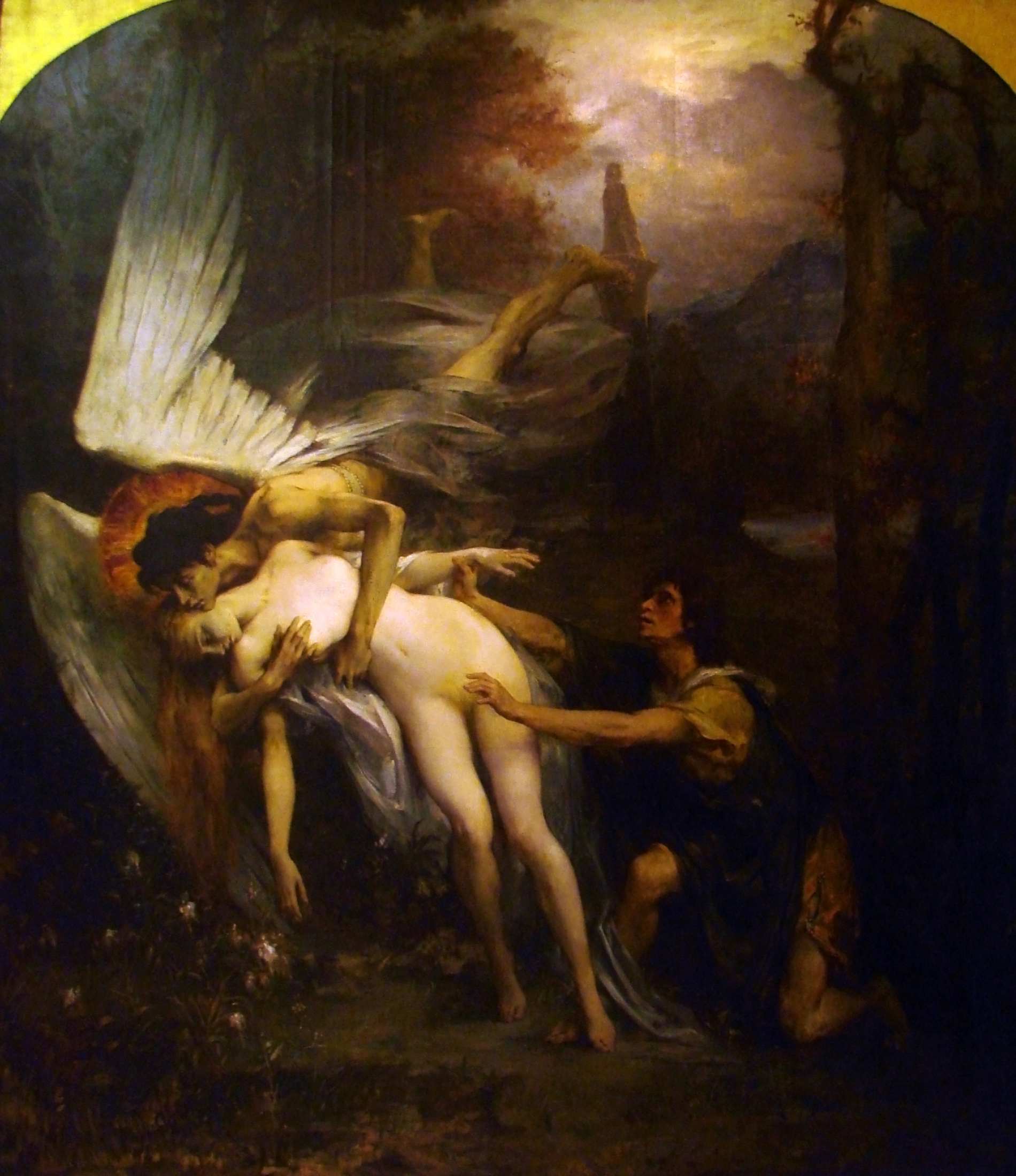
Young Woman and Death, 1876

He was the son of an interior decorator and embroidery manufacturer. His artistic education began at the École des beaux-arts de Paris, where he worked in the studios of François-Édouard Picot, Alexandre Cabanel and Eugène Fromentin.

His first exhibit at the Salon came in 1865, where he displayed his portrayal of Hecuba, finding the body of her son, Polydorus of Troy, at the seashore. It brought him a first-class medal. Two years later, he received an award for his version of Jehoash of Judah being saved from the slaughter of his family ordered by Athaliah. In 1869 he was given a prize for his "Hebrew Captive Weeping at the Ruins of Jerusalem". In 1872, after showing his portrait of Herodias, he was named a Chevalier in the Legion of Honor.

In addition to his canvases, he created several murals; notably, scenes from the life of Saint Denis at the Church of Saint-Merri, a "Coronation of Charlemagne" (1881) at the Panthéon and an "Essay on the Glories of Burgundy" which fills a panel in the State Hall of Burgundy in Dijon.

Despite being a Chevalier, his career suffered from the anti-Semitism that swept France after the Dreyfus Affair and he lost customers by refusing to sign his paintings with a different name. He was, however, able to continue participating in the Salon until 1903. During this time, he took an extended trip to the Middle East with his friend, Fromentin, and produced several Orientalist works.

He also served as a teacher. Among his notable students one may mention Georges A. L. Boisselier, Henri Dabadie, Lluïsa Vidal and Eugène Trigoulet.

== Other sources ==
- Biographical notes @ the Jewish Encyclopedia
- Biographical notes @ Larousse
