= Afraid of the Dark (Young Ejecta song) =

Single by Ejecta

from the album Dominae
- Released: September 17, 2013
- Recorded: 2013
- Genre: Synthpop; Dream pop
- Length: 4:24
- Label: Driftless Recordings; Copyright Control
- Songwriter: Leanne Macomber
- Producer: Joel Ford

Ejecta singles chronology
"Jeremiah (The Denier)" (2013)	"Afraid of the Dark" (2013)	"It's Only Love" (2013)

"Afraid of the Dark" is a song released by American synthpop duo Young Ejecta, consisting of Leanne Macomber and Joel Ford, under the name Ejecta. Written by Macomber and produced by Ford, the song was released in September 2013 as the second single from the duo's debut studio album Dominae (2013). The four-minute track lyrically addresses "someone, broken by love, who is building up strength to protect themselves in future", as stated by Polari Magazine. It earned positive reviews from music critics upon release and was played on the show The Vampire Diaries. In 2014, the group performed the song at the fourth annual Gorilla vs. Bear festival.

== Production and composition ==
"Afraid of the Dark" was written by Leanne Macomber, with production by Joel Ford and mastering by Josh Bonati. It is a synthpop song running for four minutes and 24 seconds. A writer for Fact felt its overall style was taken from songs in the soundtrack of the 2011 film Drive. Writers have analyzed airy synths, bright brash Europop-influenced New Order-esque synth stabs, a driving arpeggiated Kavinsky-style bass and a bouncing four-on-the-floor minimal disco drum beat. These accompany Macomber's "glossy" vocals. According to Polari Magazine's Andrew Darley, the lyrics discuss "someone, broken by love, who is building up strength to protect themselves in future." In a Pitchfork Media review, Jerry Gordan said the chorus, "This warm heart's afraid of the dark/ Never gonna stop, I’m never going to conquer", might be the lyrical thesis of Dominae.

As said in publications, "Afraid of the Dark" opens with an eerie and dark Joy Division-like soundscape with only the breathy synths playing behind Macomber's vocals, and then it goes into a modern upbeat song which Annie Stevens of Hillydilly described its feel as the combination of Phantogram and The Naked and Famous. It musically departs from the ominousness of the title using a "spritely and buoyant ambiance", according to Consequence of Sound writer Virra. Josiah Hughes of Exclaim! described the track as "the Italians Do It Better crew if they had a different batch of synthesizers." It has also been referred by reviewers as "lightly dancey", "glowing", "romantic" and "propulsive[ly] cinema[tic]".

== Release and reception ==
The official single release date of "Afraid of the Dark" was September 17, 2013. In the United States, it was issued by Driftless Recordings, while in the United Kingdom it was distributed by Copyright Control. It was the second single released from Ejecta's debut studio album Dominae, which was released on November 4. On the album, "Afraid of the Dark" is the fifth out of ten tracks.

"Afraid of the Dark" has earned positive reviews from critics. In her review for Hillydilly, Annie Stevens called it "another strong offering" from Ejecta which "makes for a catchy pop gem that will undoubtedly get people listening." Virra of Consequence of Sound said that, "Though not an arena-sized gut-buster by any means, [the song's] electronic sweeps are truly electric and have quite the anthemic after effects." Clash's Robin Murray called it "another sign of the direction the pair are heading in, with Leanne Macomber adding shards of light to Joel Ford's synth-noir production." Writing for Popmatters, Gary Suarez called it a "dancefloor beacon" that "beckons the hips". Katie Taylor, in her review for The 405, gave a suggestion of trying "not to dance around the room swishing chiffon scarves, especially if you're at work. Leave it for when you get home", and another writer for the source, Lee Wakefield, called it ready for indie discos. Slant Magazine opined it "builds from Enya-esque meditation to '80s synth-pop splendor in under two minutes."

"Afraid of the Dark" was played in "Death and the Maiden", the seventh episode of the fifth season of the American supernatural drama television series The Vampire Diaries. Regarding the song being used in the show, Ford said in an interview that "Hopefully all of our fans at the show at Glasslands are 12 years old and huge fans of Vampire Diaries."

== Live performances ==
On September 12, 2014, Ejecta performed "Afraid of the Dark" at the fourth annual Gorilla vs. Bear festival at the Granada Theater in Dallas, Texas.

== Personnel ==
Credits are adapted from liner notes of Dominae:

- Leanne Macomber – songwriting, vocals
- Joel Ford – production
- Josh Bonati – mastering
