= Death and the Maiden (motif) =

Art motif

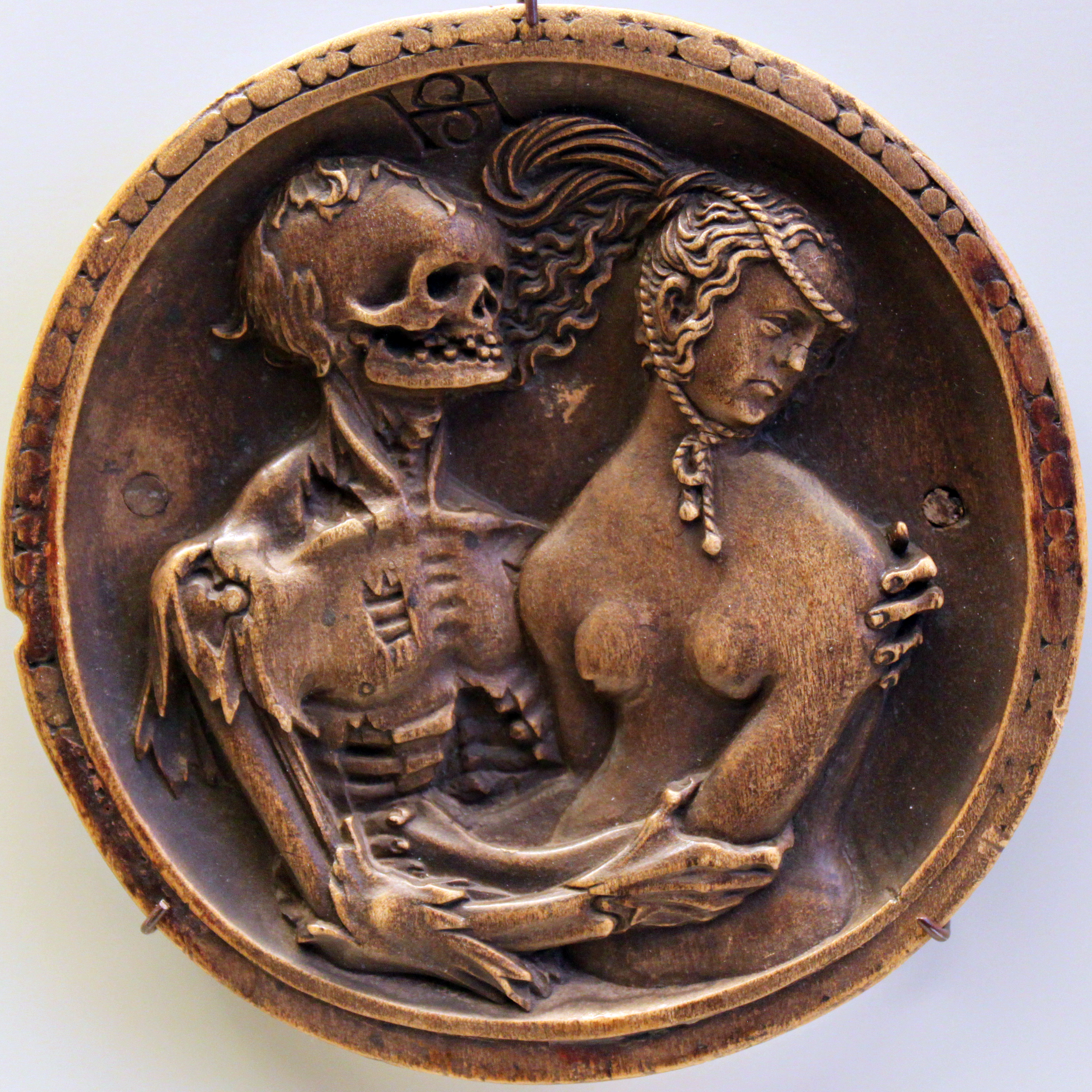
Boxwood carving by Hans Schwarz, c. 1520. Bode Museum, Berlin

Death and the Maiden (Der Tod und das Mädchen in German) was a common motif in Renaissance art, especially in German painting and printmaking. The usual form shows just two figures, with a young woman being seized by a personification of Death, often shown as a skeleton. Variants may include other figures. It developed from the Danse Macabre with an added erotic subtext. The German artist Hans Baldung depicted it several times.

The motif was revived during the romantic era in the arts, a notable example being Franz Schubert's song "Der Tod und das Mädchen", setting a poem by the German poet Matthias Claudius. Part of the piano part was re-used in Schubert's famous String Quartet No. 14, which is therefore also known by this title, in either English or German.

== Selected versions ==
- Painting: Death and the Maiden (Der Tod und das Mädchen) by Hans Baldung (1517)
- Painting: Death and the Maiden (Der Tod und das Mädchen) by Niklaus Manuel Deutsch I (1517)
- Painting: Young Woman and Death (La jeune fille et la mort) by Henri-Léopold Lévy (1876)
- Engraving: Death and the Maiden (Døden og Piken) by Edvard Munch (1894)
- Painting: Death and the Maiden (Der Tod und das Mädchen) by Adolf Hering (1900) – private collection, location unknown
- Painting: Death and the Maiden by Marianne Stokes (1908)
- Painting: Death and the Maiden (Tod und Mädchen) by Egon Schiele (1915)
- Drawing: Death and the Maiden (Der Tod und das Mädchen) by Clara Siewert (1920s)
- Drawing: Death and the Maiden (Der Tod und das Mädchen) by Joseph Beuys (1959)
- Painting: Death and the Maiden, Ballet for Two by Herbert Lautman (1995)

=== Gallery ===
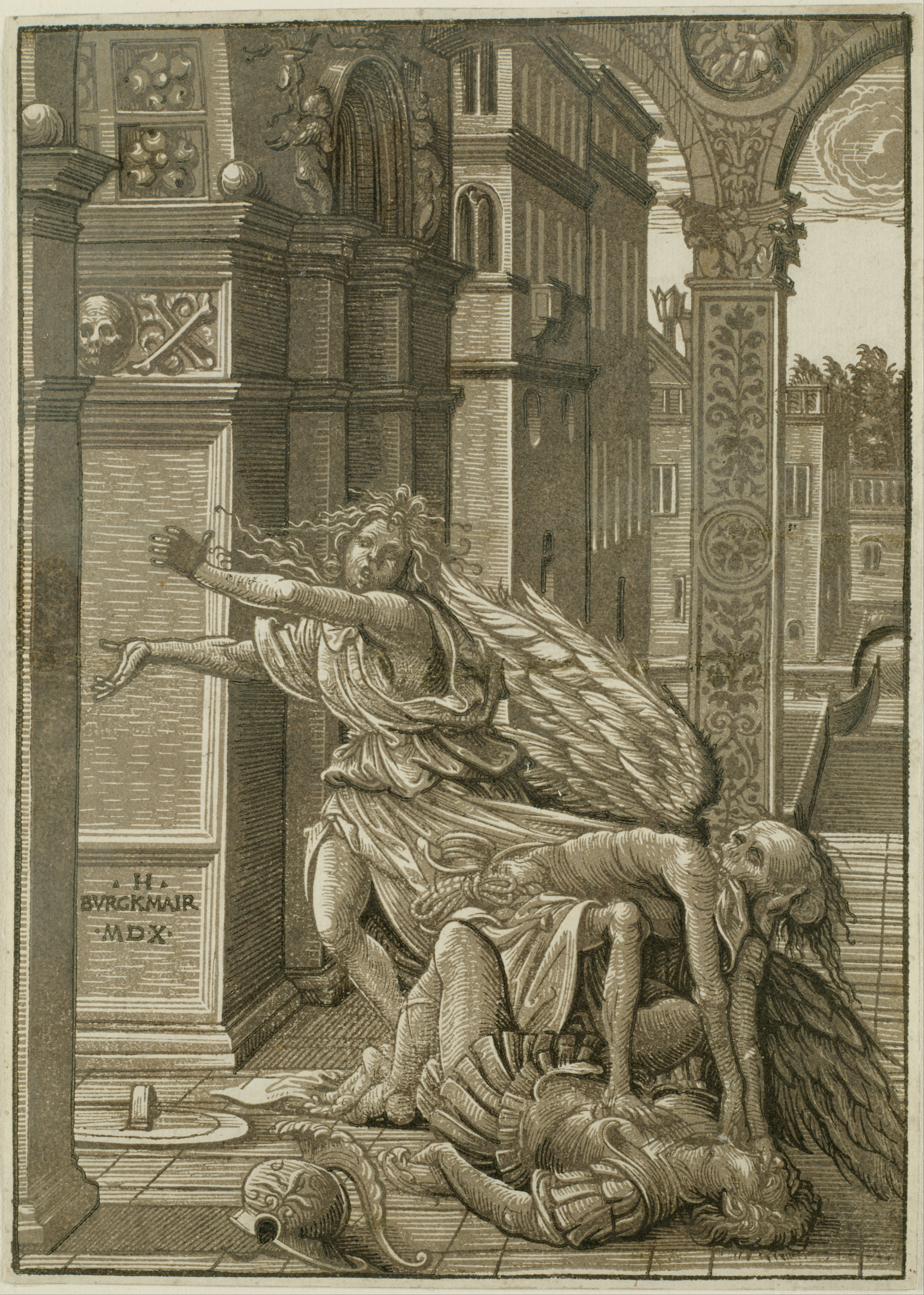
Hans Burgkmair, Lovers Surprised by Death, 1510. Art Institute of Chicago

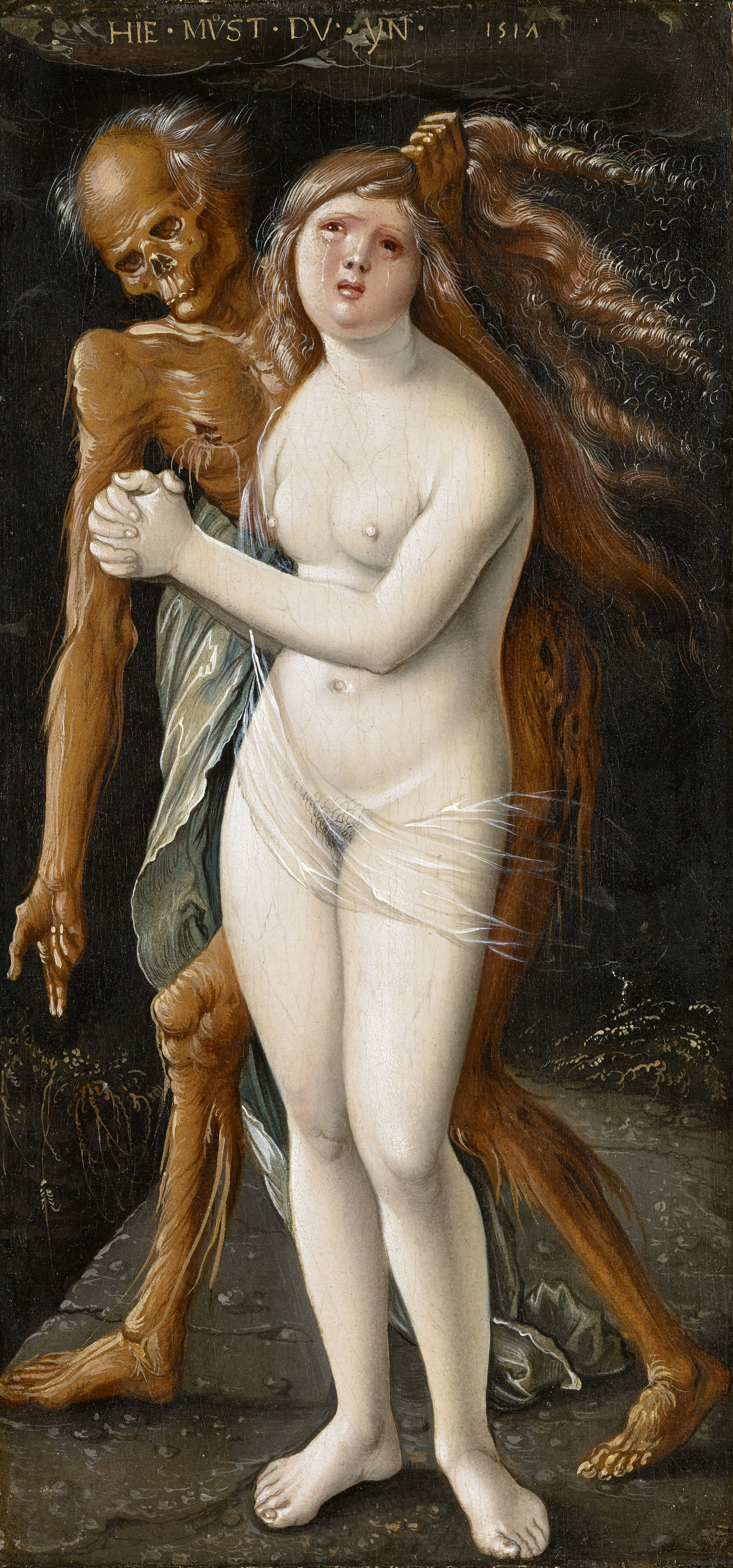
Hans Baldung, Death and the Maiden, 1517. Kunstmuseum Basel

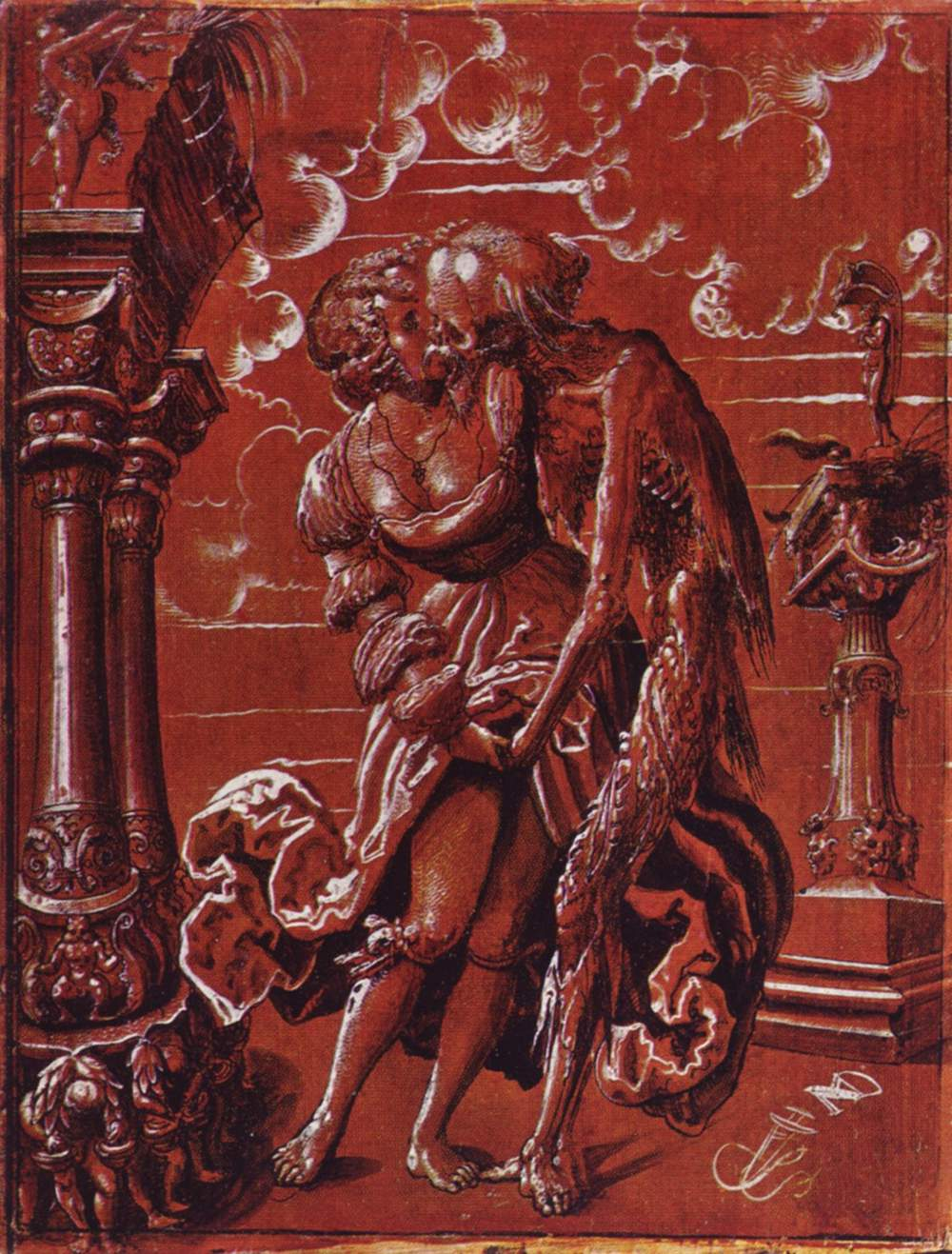
Chiaroscuro woodcut by Niklaus Manuel Deutsch I, 1517. Kunstmuseum Basel

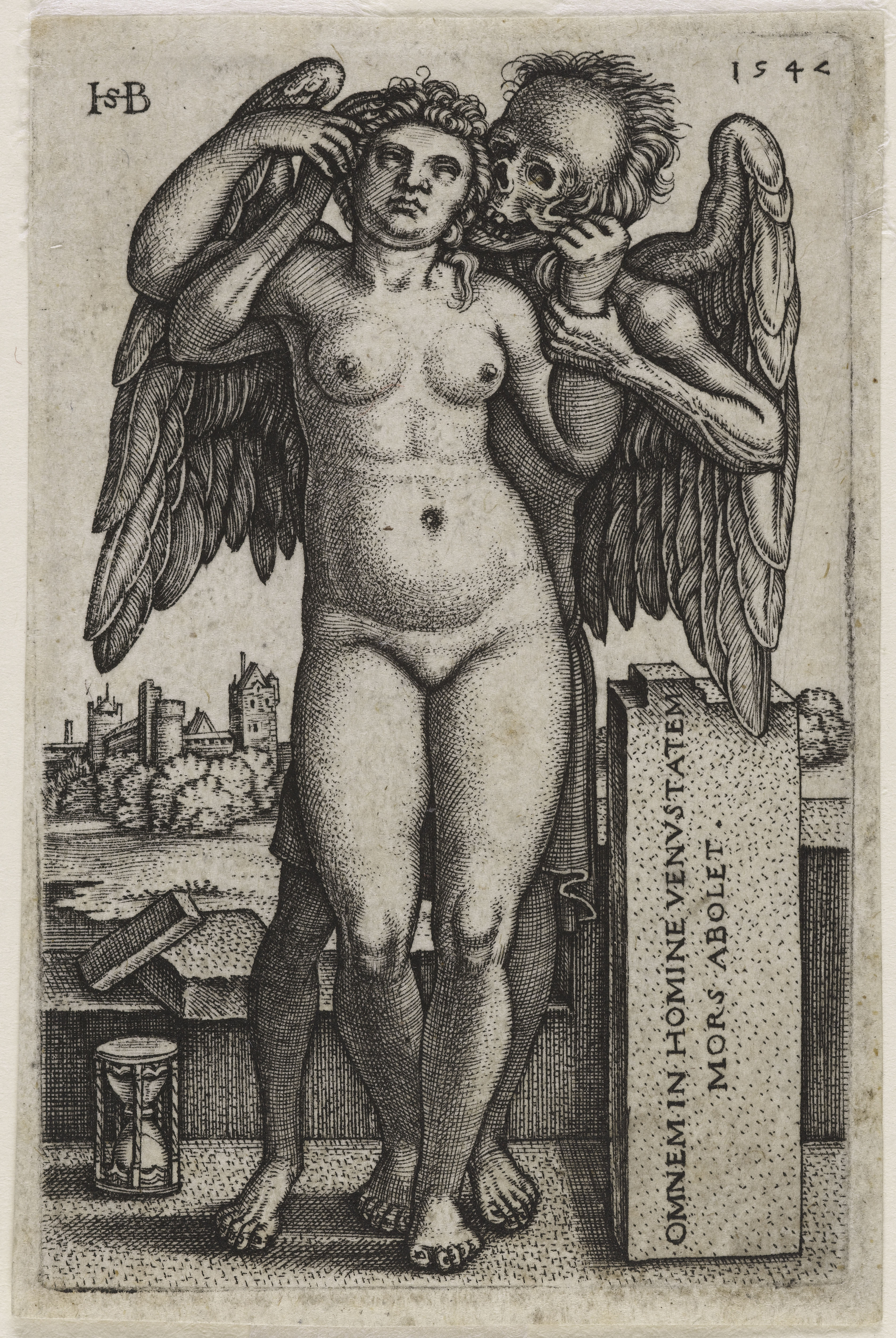
Small engraving by Sebald Beham, 1547

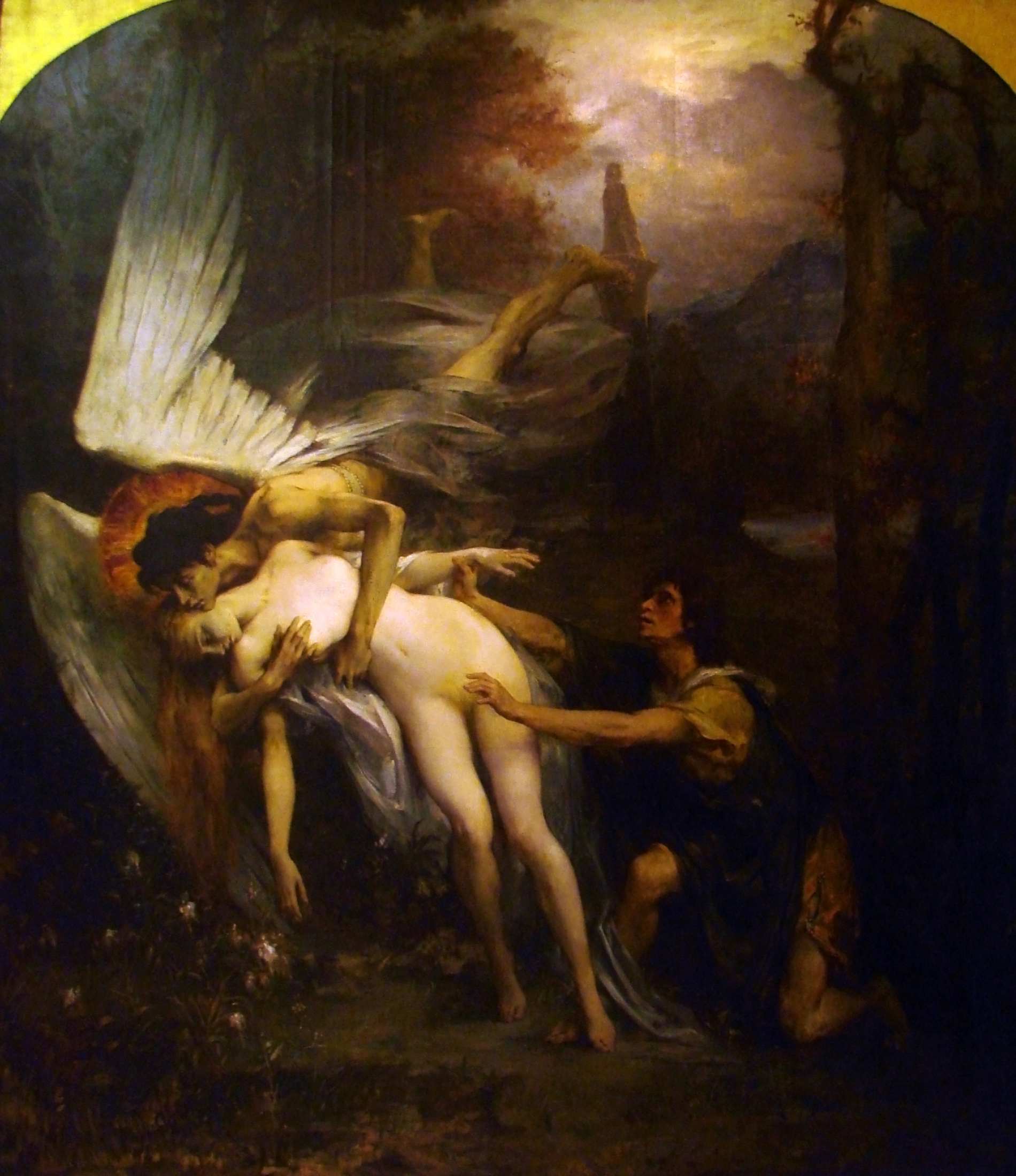
La jeune fille et la mort by Henri-Léopold Lévy, 1876. Museum of Fine Arts of Nancy

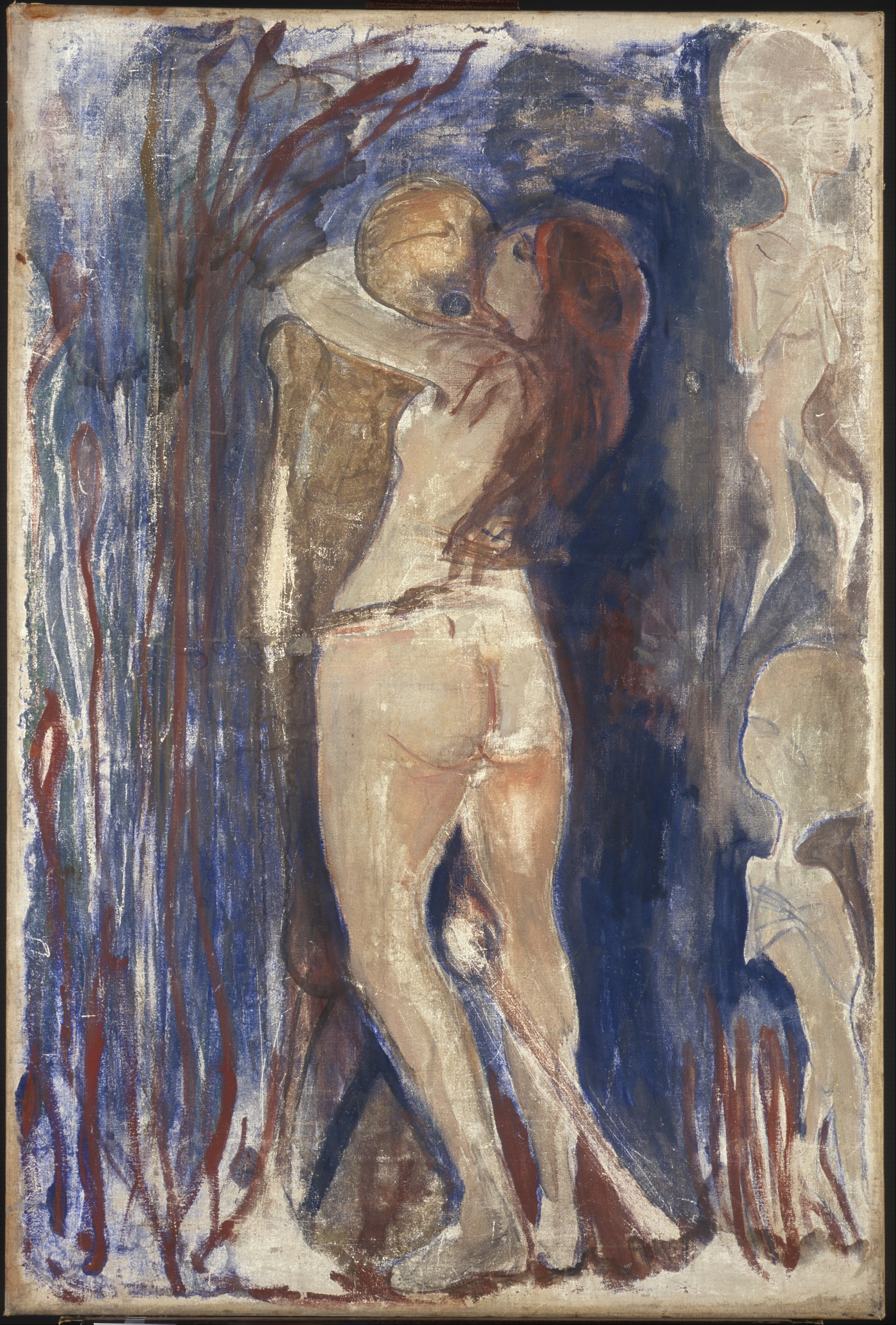
Edvard Munch, Death and Life, 1894. Munch Museum, Oslo

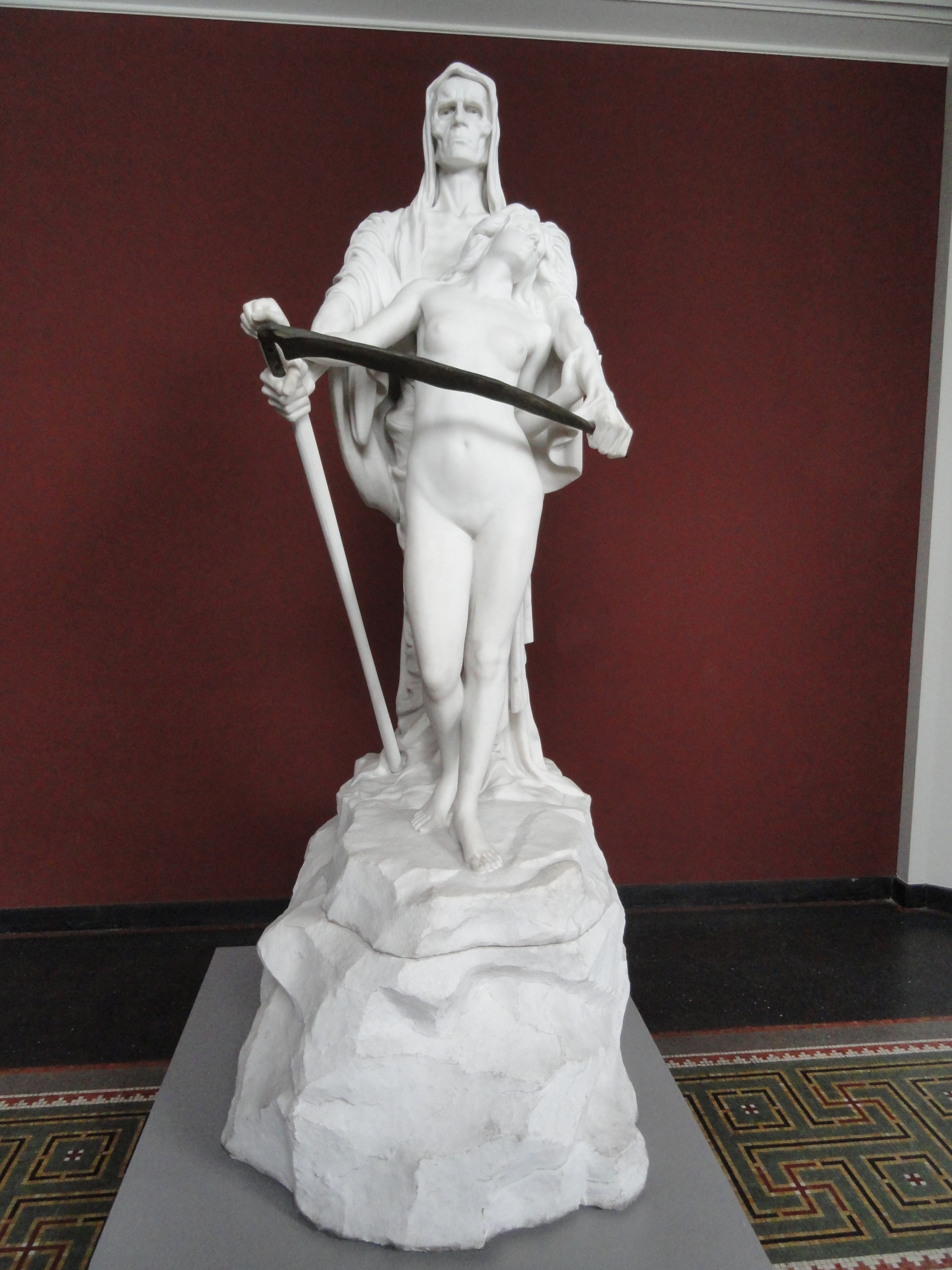
Elna Borch, 1905. Ny Carlsberg Glyptotek, Copenhagen

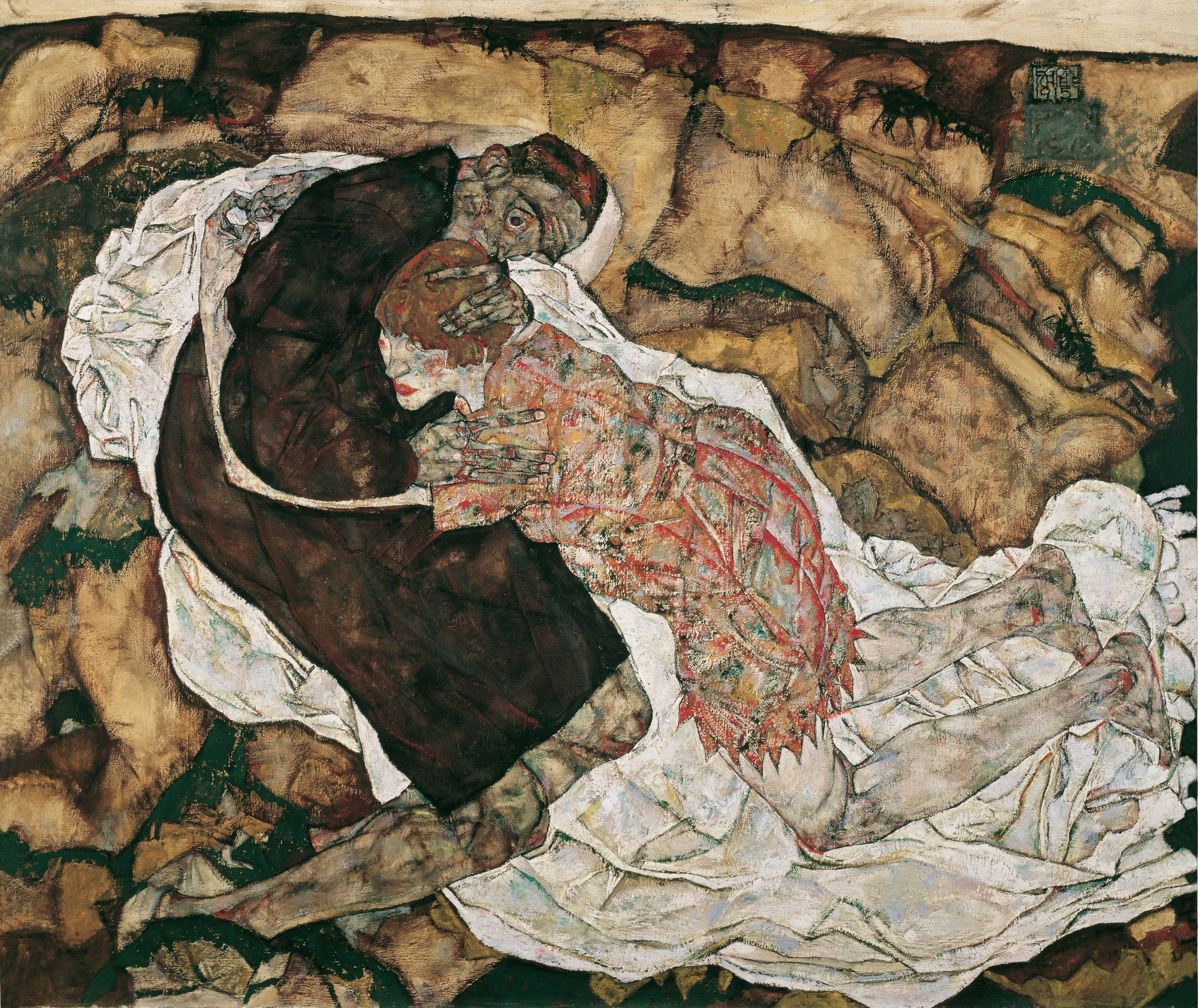
Death and the Maiden, by Egon Schiele, 1915. Österreichische Galerie Belvedere, Vienna

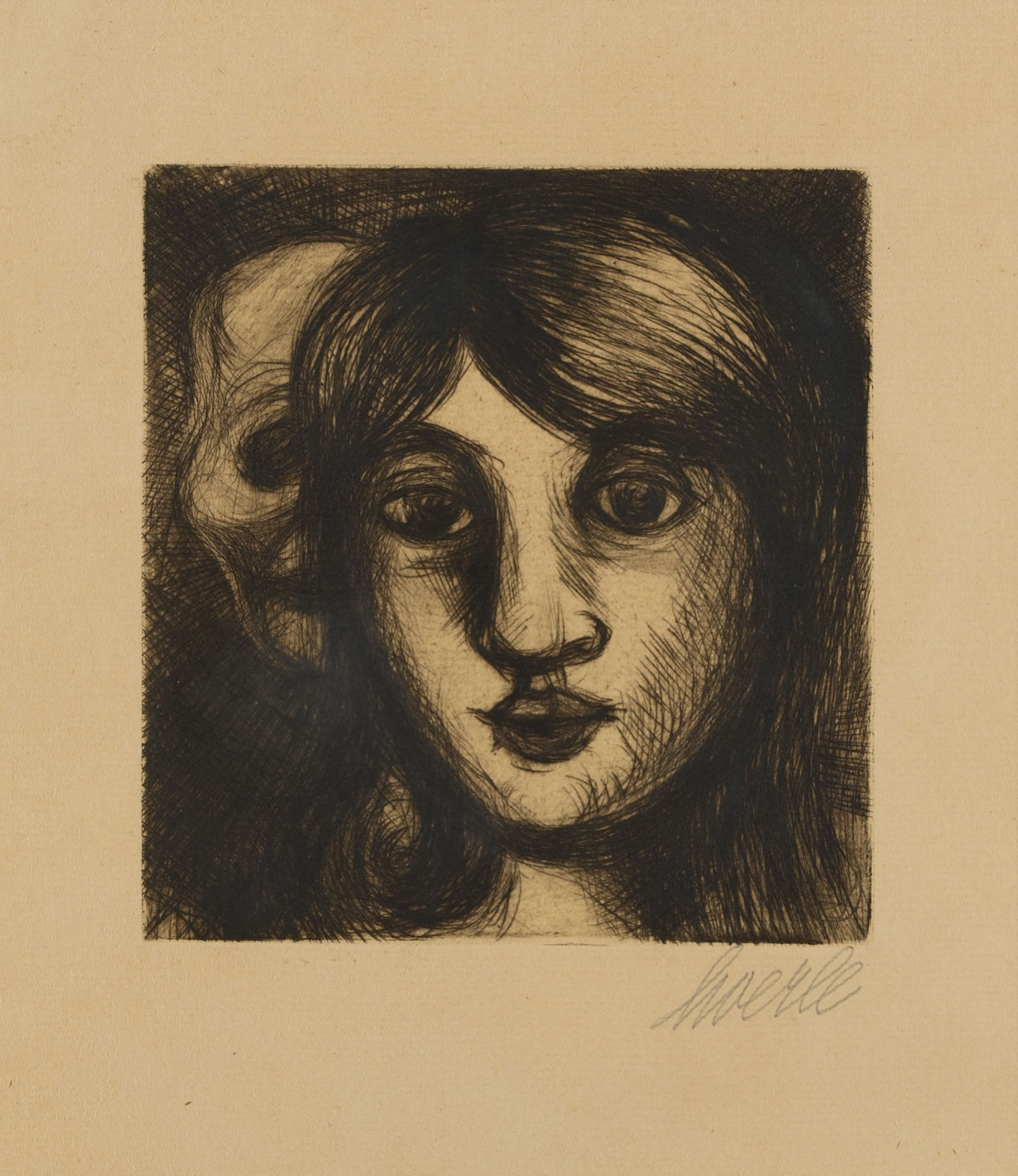
Heinrich Hoerle, c. 1919

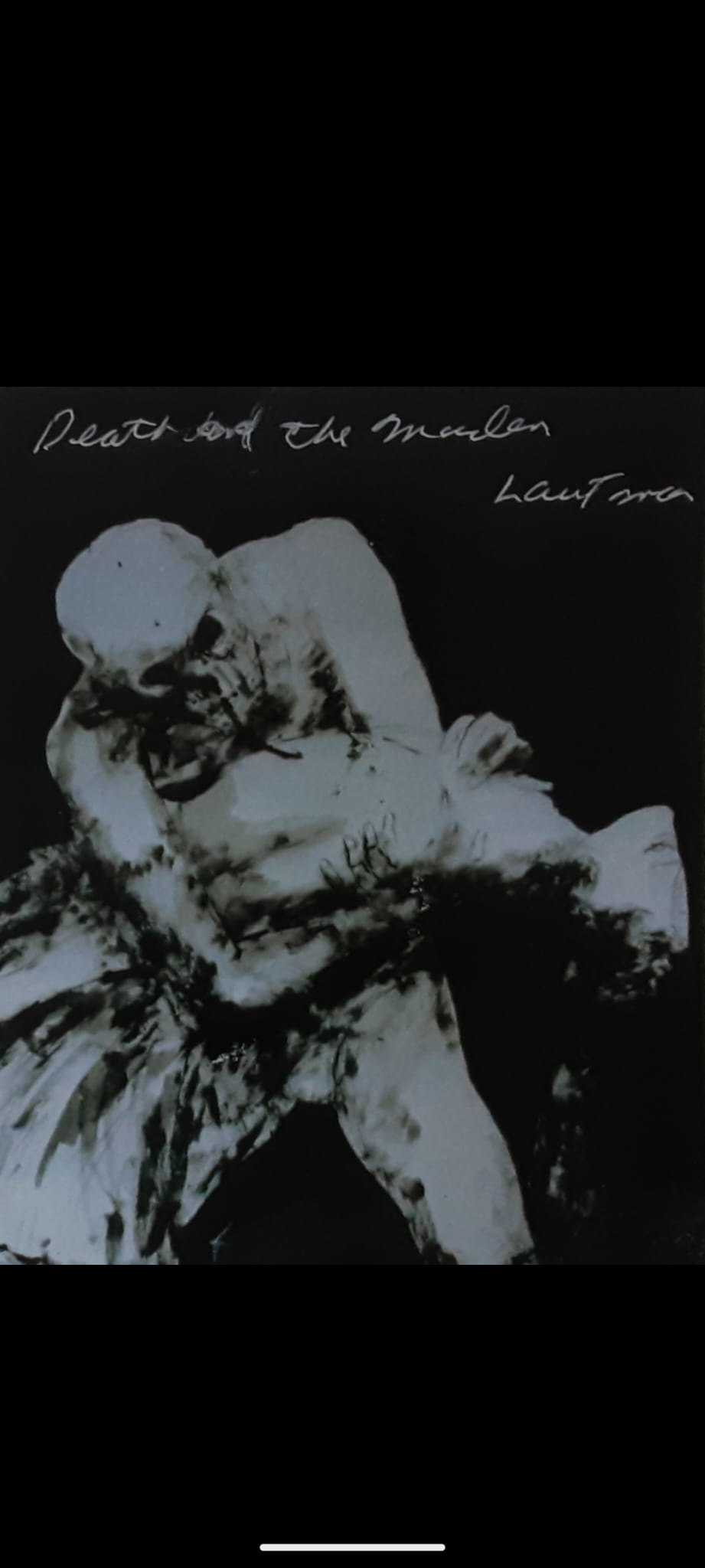
Herbert Lautman, Death and the Maiden, Ballet for Two (1995)
