= A Girl and Death =

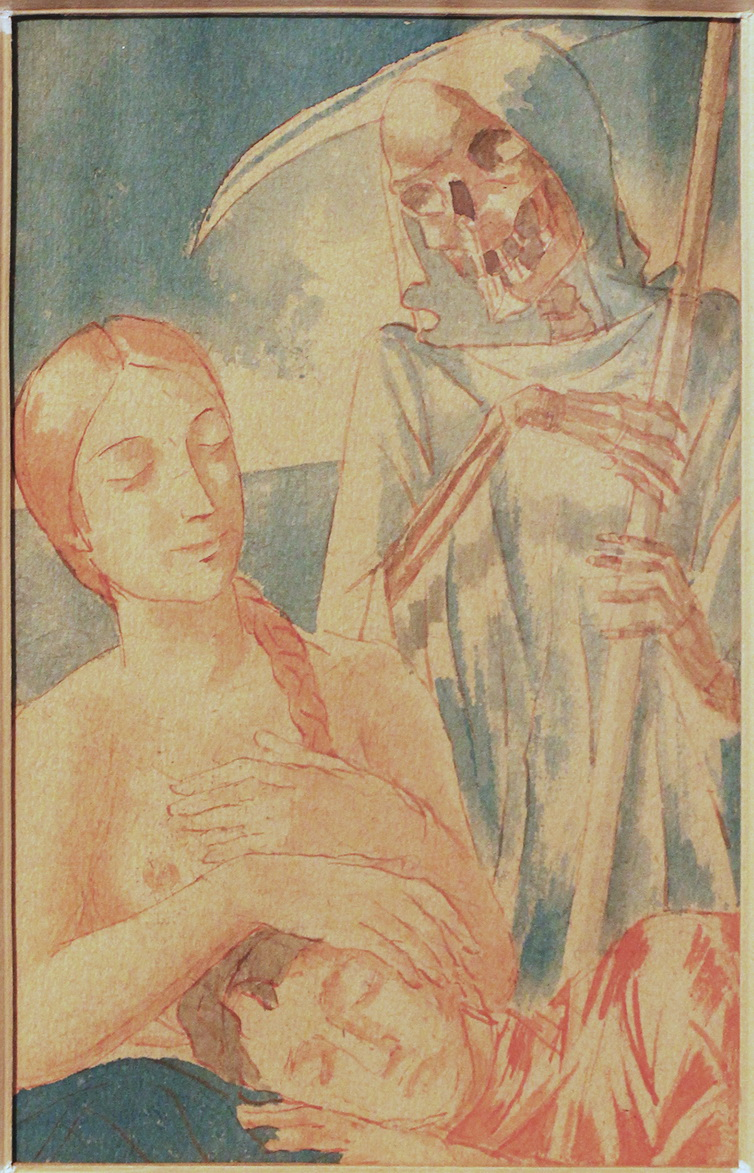
A 1932 illustration by Petrov-Vodkin

"A Girl and Death" is an 1892 fantasy poem (commonly subtitled in print as "fairy tale") by Maksim Gorky, written in his youth. It was first published in the newspaper Novaya Zhizn in 1917. The poem is best known for Joseph Stalin's inscription on its copy: "This piece is stronger than Goethe's Faust (love defeats death)".

== Plot ==
The tsar, defeated in a battle, is annoyed by a laughter of a girl in the bushes. He angrily rebukes her, but she retorts that she is speaking to her lover and does not care. Angered, the tsar orders to kill her. Death allows the girl to kiss her lover one last time, but the girl does not return on time. Death finds the girl asleep hugging her lover. The girl asks to forgive her lover and tells Death that because of the love she is no longer afraid of her destiny. Touched, Death allows them both to live, but warns that from that moment Death will eternally be beside Love.

== Stalin's comment ==
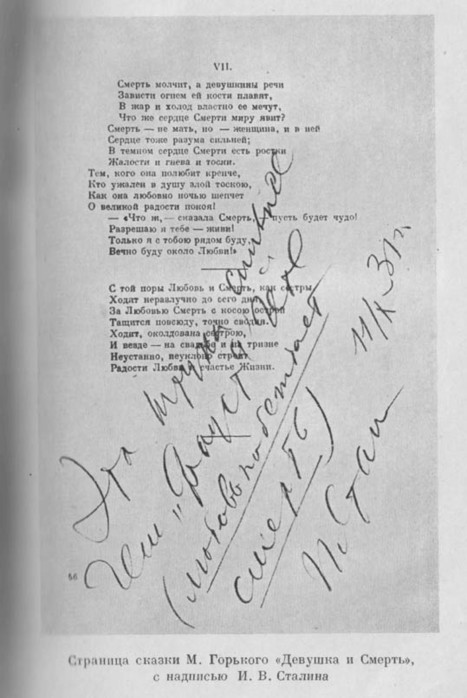
A page from the poem with Stalin's authograph

On September 11, 1931, Gorky read the poem to his visitors Joseph Stalin, Kliment Voroshilov and Vyacheslav Molotov. On that same day Stalin left his autograph on the last page of the poem: "This piece is stronger than Goethe's Faust (love defeats death)". Voroshilov also left a "resolution": "I am illiterate, but I think that Comrade Stalin more than correctly defined the meaning of A. Gorky's poems. On my own behalf, I will say: I love M. Gorky as my and my class of writer, who correctly defined our forward movement." The phylologist Vyacheslav Ivanov recounts: "My father, who spoke about this episode with Gorky, insisted emphatically that Gorky was offended. Stalin and Voroshilov were drunk and fooling around."

The reading event that was later depicted by Anatoly Yar-Kravchenko in his painting. In 1947 the painting received the State Stalin Prize of second degree.

Stalin's comment for years predefined the opinions of Soviet literary critics. Modern critic Dmitry Bykov characterized the poem as "atrocious" and suggested that this was actually the reason it had not been published for a long time, rather than due to censorship, contrary to Gorky's claims.
