= Death and the Maiden (The Vampire Diaries) =

- The Vampire Diaries episode
- Episode no.: Season 5 Episode 7
- Directed by: Leslie Libman
- Written by: Rebecca Sonnenshine
- Production code: 2J7507
- Original air date: November 14, 2013

Guest appearances
- Olga Fonda (Nadia); Janina Gavankar (Qetsiyah / Tessa); Rick Cosnett (Professor Wes Maxfield)

Episode chronology
| ← Previous "Handle with Care" | Next → "Dead Man on Campus" |
- The Vampire Diaries season 5

"Death and the Maiden" is the seventh episode of the fifth season of the American series The Vampire Diaries and the series' 96th episode overall. "Death and the Maiden" was originally aired on November 14, 2013, on The CW. The episode was written by Rebecca Sonnenshine and directed by Leslie Libman.

== Plot ==
Silas heads back to Mystic Falls to find Amara. He no longer plans to help Damon bring Bonnie back to life after Amara attacked him. All he wants is to find her and kill her to destroy the Other Side and then kill himself so they can be together forever in the afterlife.

Amara is kept at the Salvatore house's basement where they all try to keep her alive and safe. Jeremy brings her some food and Bonnie's spirit is also there. Jeremy and Bonnie are very surprised to discover that Amara can see and feel Bonnie and after this, they have the idea of Bonnie taking the place of Amara as the anchor. They share this with Damon and Elena who agree to try it, only that they need a witch to perform the spell so Damon heads to Qetsiyah's to make a deal with her.

Qetsiyah (Janina Gavankar) agrees to help them since with that switch, Amara will die and the Other Side will remain existent so she can be there with Silas for the rest of the time. To perform the spell she needs blood from all three doppelgangers, Elena, Katherine, and Amara. Elena and Amara are already in town, they only need Caroline (Candice Accola) to bring Katherine back to town as well.

Katherine, who got bad news from Maxfield (Rick Cosnett) that she is just aging and there is no way to stop it, agrees to come back with Caroline. Katherine makes a deal with Qetsiyah that after the anchor spell Qetsiyah will help her to find a cure to stop the aging, otherwise, she will not give her her blood that is required for the spell.

During the spell, Silas intervenes and tries to stop it. The power goes out and in the chaos, Stefan – who just wants revenge against Silas after what he has done to him – kidnaps Amara while Silas and Qetsiyah start fighting. Silas impales her with a fireplace poker when Stefan calls him to say that he has Amara and if he does not find them in ten minutes, he will take her away and keep her alive forever. Silas leaves to find Stefan and Amara.

Silas finds Amara tied on a tree and while he tries to untie her, she begs him to kill her. Stefan appears and they start fighting, with Stefan finally stabbing him. Silas dies and Amara stabs herself. In the meantime, Elena finds Qetsiyah and makes her finish the spell so that Bonnie becomes the anchor. She manages to finish the spell just in time before Amara dies. Bonnie becomes the new anchor and Silas is trapped on the Other Side.

Now that everything is done, Katherine finds Qetsiyah to ask for her cure only to find that Qetsiyah changed her mind and all she wants now is to die and meet her true love on the Other Side. She kills herself without finding a cure for Katherine. Katherine is once again alone since now that Bonnie is back, Caroline asks her to move out of their dorm. Nadia (Olga Fonda) appears to ask her to go back with her to Prague, but Katherine turns her down. Caroline is shocked by the fact that Nadia is Katherine's daughter.

Qetsiyah needs to pass to the Other Side, but before she does, she informs Bonnie that from now on, whenever a supernatural creature dies, they will pass through her since she is the anchor and she will feel every death. Before she passes through her, she warns her that it hurts. Qetsiyah passes through Bonnie and Bonnie screams in pain.

The episode ends with Stefan burying Silas. Stefan thought that by killing Silas it would make the pain go away but the memories are still there haunting him and he collapses in pain.

== Featured music ==
In the "Death and the Maiden" episode we can hear the songs:

- "Afraid" by The Neighbourhood
- "With Love" by Christina Grimmie
- "Afraid of the Dark" by Ejecta
- "Don't Swallow the Cap" by The National
- "You" by The Aquatones

== Reception ==
=== Ratings ===
In its original American broadcast, "Death and the Maiden" was watched by 2.72 million; up 0.13 from the previous episode.

=== Reviews ===
Carrie Raisler from The A.V. Club gave a B+ rate to the episode saying that it was "a fairly entertaining" one. "The highlight [of the episode] is the inevitable scene where all three doppelgangers finally meet face-to-face for the first time, to help Qetsiyah gather enough power to perform the anchor switching spell. Despite some very overly busy direction, the sight of three Nina Dobrevs in one scene together is delightful enough to overcome this distraction."

Stephanie Hall of KSiteTV gave a good review to the episode saying that the show continued "the pattern of solid episodes this season. [...] Though not the most intense episode, it was a generally enthralling and contained more enjoying quips than usual." Hall gave a positive feedback to Sonnenshine, the writer of the episode: "Lightening up all of the drama and deaths of this episode were great and humorous lines of dialogue. Writer Rebecca Sonnenshine included a perfect amount of sass, most notably with Tessa, to break the intensity."

Matt Richenthal of TV Fanatic graded the episode with a 3.1/5.

All three main actors of the show, Dobrev, Wesley and Somerhalder, received positive comments from the reviewers. Dobrev about how well she managed to portray three different characters, Wesley for his portrayal of Silas and Stefan and Somerhalder about the scene where his character, Damon, tries to keep Amara alive.
