= Egon Schiele: Death and the Maiden =

2016 Austrian film

- Directed by: Dieter Berner
- Starring: Noah Saavedra; Maresi Riegner
- Release date: 26 September 2016 (ZFF)
- Running time: 110 minutes
- Countries: Austria; Luxembourg
- Language: German

Egon Schiele: Death and the Maiden (German: Egon Schiele: Tod und Mädchen) is a 2016 Austrian / Luxembourgish biographical film directed by Dieter Berner.

== Plot ==
Egon Schiele is a university student living in artistic poverty in pre-WWI Vienna with his younger sister Gerti, whom he cares for with funds sent from Prague by a rich uncle. Unknown to his uncle, Egon has stopped going to university in order to dedicate himself to his drawing of fine art and his execution of related oil paintings. He has a particular interest in executing figure studies of young women, even of teen-age years, in his nude figure studies. He sells some of his drawings and paintings for modest sums which, along with his stipend from his uncle, allow him to somehow survive in Vienna with his sister.

As Egon's art works begin to circulate, he eventually meets with Gustav Klimt who has established himself as one of Vienna's leading artists. Klimt is impressed by Egon's work and offers to purchase some of his art work even though Egon declines, stating that money is not his principal object in creating art. When one of Klimt's models shows up during his interview with Egon, Klimt notices that Egon is taken with the aesthetics of the female model and offers her to Egon for possible drawing and painting sessions. Egon is pleased with the offer and Klimt then also offers to trade some of his drawings for some of Egon's drawings since Egon would not sell them. The two artists appear to have found common ground for an exchange.

When Klimt's model Walburga "Wally" Neuzil arrives at Egon's studio for modeling, the two quickly form a romantic relationship aside from their mutual interest in art. Egon's sister Gerti becomes perplexed when Egon stops drawing her due to his newly found interest in Klimt's model, and his sister decides to write a letter to her uncle to explain the arrival of this unwanted female rival. When the uncle writes back to Egon, he writes to say that he is now withdrawing his monthly stipend from Egon and recommends that Egon mend his unconventional ways and return to a more socially acceptable moral lifestyle. Meanwhile, news has reached the local police that Egon's drawings have been reviewed in police complaints filled out by local residents; they assert that he has been using under-aged girls as models for explicit nude drawings and oil paintings. Egon is summoned to court for a hearing to investigate the allegations made against him.

The hearing goes poorly and a full court case is scheduled against Egon; he is accused of abducting and possibly sexually assaulting one of his teenage models. Wally, Klimt's former model, realizes that Egon needs a strong lawyer and goes to Klimt to get help which Klimt then provides for Egon's defense. The court case seems to take a positive turn when none of the young girls are found to have been objects of passion for Egon, and a medical examination finds all of them to still have maintained their maidenly virtue. Still, the court finds that the subjective assessment of the moral value of Egon's art is still to be ascertained and the court finds his drawings to be of a lewd nature subject to punishment. Egon is found guilty of this count of creating lewd drawings and given 30-days probation.

Egon's health has suffered over his years of artistic poverty throughout his younger twenties and he requires constant medical attention. His relationship with Klimt's former model eventually becomes untenable and he breaks with her, intending to marry someone from a higher social class, leaving Wally in emotional turmoil. She reluctantly volunteers to work as a nurse when WWI battles occur in places far from Egon. Egon is now free to marry and even has his first art exhibition openings. However, his questionable health -- and most importantly, his case of the Spanish flu -- is now advanced. No medicine can ultimately save him; he dies prematurely despite heroic efforts by his sister to care for him. He dies at the age of 28, a prolific artist, having left over 300 oil paintings and over 2000 drawings in his studio. As the film ends, an accountant begins to take inventory of the large number of drawings left in Egon's apartment, and the accountant starts associating unremarkable prices for the estimates of the value of each of the individual works of art.

== Cast ==
- Noah Saavedra – Egon Schiele
- Maresi Riegner – Gerti Schiele, Egon's sister
- Valerie Pachner – Wally Neuzil, Egon's model
- Marie Jung – Edith Harms
- Larissa Breidbach – Moa Mandu
- Elisabeth Umlauft – Adele Harms
- Thomas Schubert – Anton Peschka
- Daniel Sträßer – Dom Osen
- Cornelius Obonya – Gustav Klimt
- André Jung – Richter St. Pölten
- Nina Proll – Varieteédirektorin
- Luc Feit – Arthur Roessler
- Fanny Berner – Tatjana von Mossig
- Wolfram Berger – Lawyer

== See also ==
- Egon Schiele – Exzess und Bestrafung (1981)
