= Tattendorf =

- Municipality
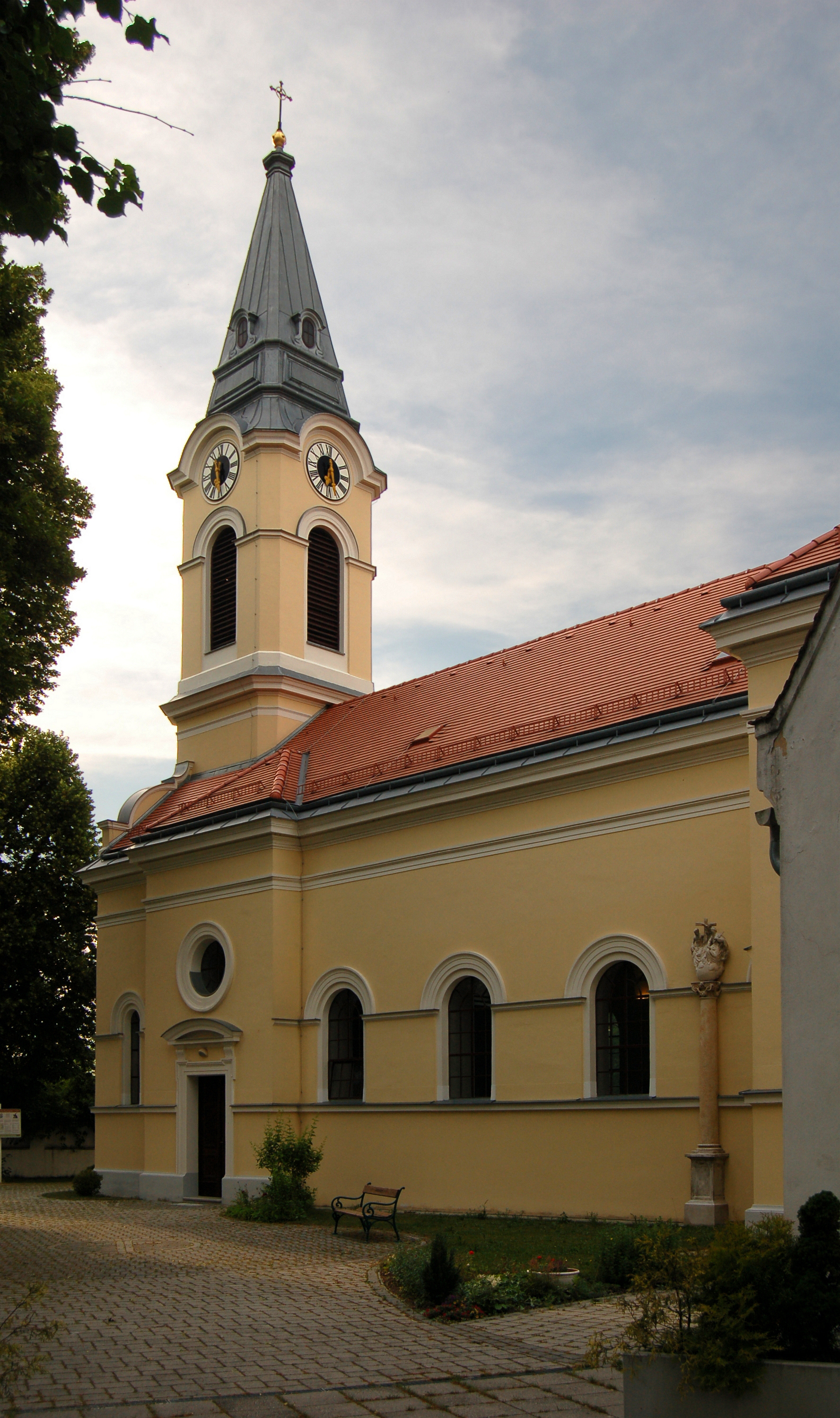
- Tattendorf parish church

- Coat of arms

- Location within Austria
- Coordinates: 47°57′N 16°16′E
- Country: Austria
- State: Lower Austria
- District: Baden

Government
  - Mayor: Alfred Reinisch

Area
  - Total: 14.35 km^{2} (5.54 sq mi)
- Elevation: 226 m (741 ft)

Population (2018-01-01)
  - Total: 1,439
  - Density: 100.3/km^{2} (259.7/sq mi)
- Time zone: UTC+1 (CET)
  - Summer (DST): UTC+2 (CEST)
- Postal code: 2523
- Area code: 02253
- Website: www.tattendorf.at

Tattendorf is a town in the district of Baden in Lower Austria in Austria.

== Population ==
Historical population
Year	Pop.	±%
1971	947	—
1981	981	+3.6%
1991	1,016	+3.6%
2001	1,206	+18.7%
2011	1,326	+10.0%
