= Young Ejecta =

American synthpop band

- Also known as: Ejecta
- Genres: Synthpop; dream pop
- Years active: 2012–present
- Labels: Copyright Control; Driftless Recordings; Happy Death
- Members: Leanne Macomber; Joel Ford

Young Ejecta (formerly known as simply Ejecta) is an American synthpop duo, consisting of Neon Indian's Leanne Macomber and producer Joel Ford of Ford & Lopatin. The band name was changed to Young Ejecta in 2014 due to the group getting a copyright notice from the closely named DJ Ejeca. Macomber appears nude on all official album covers and promotional material, and in most of their music videos. In an interview with Brooklyn Based, she gives the background "Creating Ejecta as a sort of blank slate, Macomber set out to subvert any neat categorization of the band’s music. “I really insisted like, she should be naked all the time so that no one can say, ‘Well, they’re punks, they dress like this.'”"

== History ==
Ejecta have been influenced by bands including Broadcast, OMD, Orbital, Cocteau Twins and the Human League. In November 2013, the group released their debut album, Dominae. In 2015 they issued the mini-album The Planet. The album received an indifferent review from PopMatters and a fairly positive one from Paste magazine. Heather Phares of AllMusic describes the band's synthpop sound as "gauzy".

In August 2019, their song “Welcome to Love” was chosen as the outro audio of Netflix’s “Orange is the New Black” on the 10th episode of the 7th and final season.

== Members ==
- Leanne Macomber – vocals, synthesizers
- Joel Ford – synthesizers, drum programming, producer

== Discography ==
=== Albums ===
==== Studio albums ====
List of studio albums
Title	Album details
Dominae	Released: November 4, 2013 (Worldwide); Label: Copyright Control, Driftless Recordings, Happy Death; Formats: CD, LP, digital download
Ride Lonesome	Released: June 26, 2020; Label: Driftless Recordings; Format: LP, digital download

==== Mini-albums ====
List of mini-albums
Title	Album details
The Planet	Released: January 27, 2015 (Worldwide); Label: Driftless Recordings; Formats: CD, LP, digital download

=== Singles ===
==== As main artist ====
List of singles, showing year released and album name
Title	Year	Album
"Jeremiah (The Denier)"	2013	Dominae
"Afraid of the Dark"	2013	Dominae
"It's Only Love"	2013	Dominae
"Welcome to Love"	2014	The Planet
"Your Planet"	2014	The Planet
"Into Your Heart"	2015	The Planet
"Build a Fire"	2017	None Album Single

==== As featured artist ====
List of singles as featured artist, showing year released and album name
Title	Year	Album
"Breathe" (Joel Ford featuring Ejecta)	2014	Fugitive

=== Music videos ===
List of music videos, with director
Title	Year	Director
"Eleanor Lye"	2014	Allie Avital Tsypin
"Silver"	2014	Emir Eralp
"Into Your Heart"	2015	Toshadeva Palani
"Your Planet"	2015	Heidi Petty
"Crayon Cactus"	2020	Eric Epstein
"Call My Name"	2020	Ghostdad
"Cheese"	2020	Michael Hili
"AH HA"	2020	
"9 to 5"	2021	Eric Epstein
