= Death and the Maiden (Schiele) =

Painting by Egon Schiele

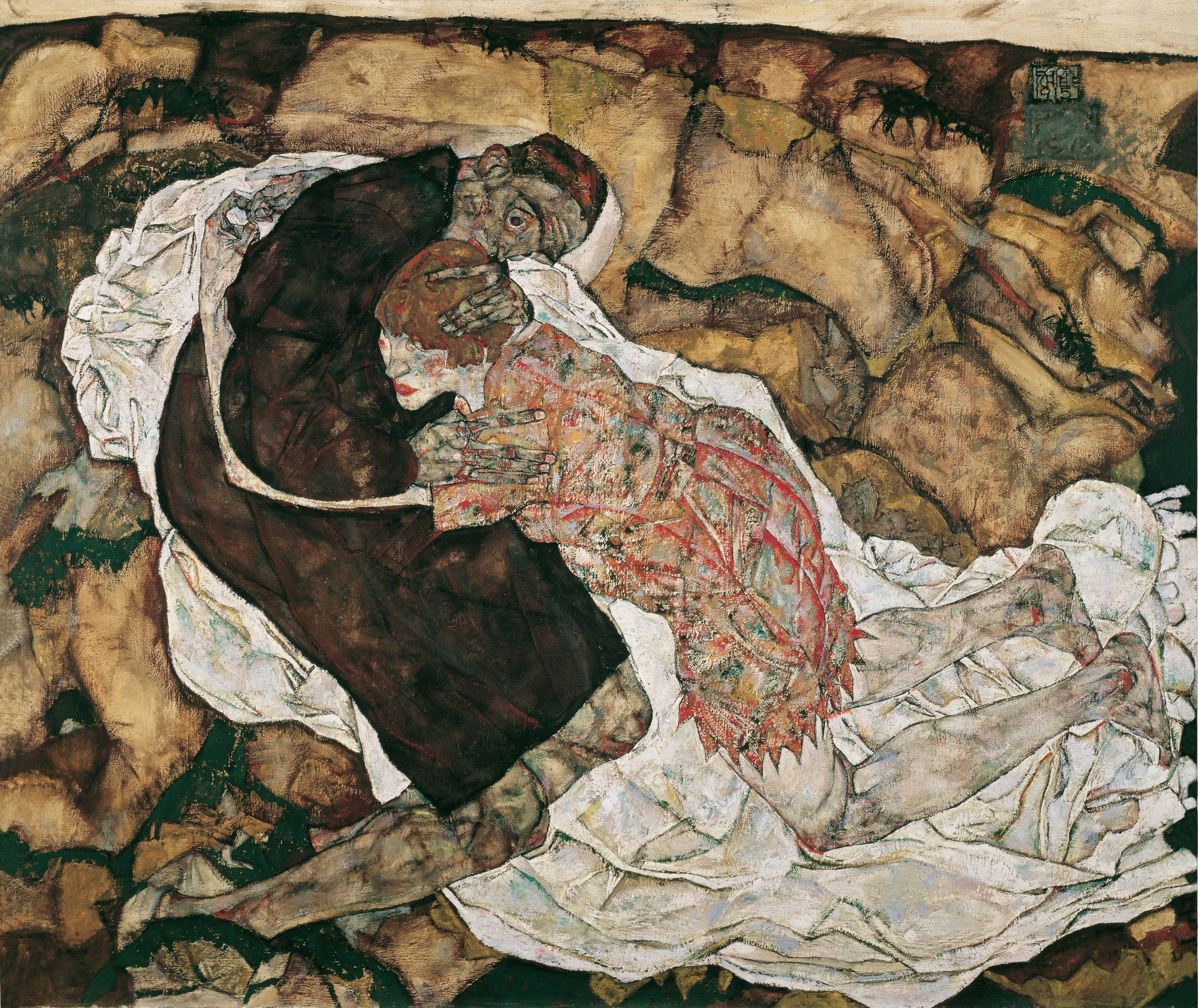
- Artist: Egon Schiele
- Year: 1915
- Medium: Oil on canvas
- Dimensions: 150 cm × 180 cm (59 in × 71 in)
- Location: Österreichische Galerie Belvedere; Vienna

Death and the Maiden is an oil on canvas painting by the Austrian painter Egon Schiele from 1915. It is exhibited in the Österreichische Galerie Belvedere, in Vienna. Schiele initially named the large picture measuring 150 by 180 centimeters as Man and Girl and also Entwined People.

== History and description ==
The painting was created when the painter, after marrying Edith Harms, was drafted into military service in the First World War. The presence of death, but also the connection between death and eros in several of his works from this period, is associated with this event. In this painting he uses a Renaissance motif, the contrast between death and the maiden. In this painting, the woman clutching the shape of death as her lover, in a monk's robe, loses its horror. Upon its unveiling, the work drew controversy for its perceived morbidity and erotic undertones, yet it has since come to be regarded as one of Schiele’s most significant paintings, reflecting his enduring preoccupation with mortality and the human psyche. There are some similarities with fellow Austrian painter Oskar Kokoschka painting The Bride of the Wind (1914).

The title of the painting is eponymous for the feature film Egon Schiele: Death and the Maiden (2016) by director Dieter Berner, based on the biographical novel Death and Girls: Egon Schiele and the Women by Hilde Berger.
