= Lost Girls (The Vampire Diaries) =

- The Vampire Diaries episode
- Episode no.: Season 1 Episode 6
- Directed by: Marcos Siega
- Written by: Kevin Williamson; Julie Plec
- Cinematography by: Paul M. Sommers
- Editing by: Lance Anderson
- Production code: 2J5005
- Original air date: October 15, 2009

Guest appearances
- Chris Johnson as Logan Fell; Marguerite MacIntyre as Liz Forbes

Episode chronology
← Previous "You're Undead to Me"	Next → "Haunted"
- The Vampire Diaries season 1

"Lost Girls" is the sixth episode of the first season of the American supernatural teen drama television series The Vampire Diaries. It aired on The CW on October 15, 2009. The episode was written by series developers Kevin Williamson and Julie Plec, and directed by supervising producer Marcos Siega.

== Plot ==
The episode starts from exactly where the previous episode ended where Elena (Nina Dobrev) asks Stefan (Paul Wesley) what he is. Before Stefan gives her an answer, there is a flashback to 1864 and we see Katherine and Stefan meet. Back in 2009, Stefan admits that he is a vampire and Elena freaks out running away even though Stefan tries to explain. He follows her to her home to promise he will not hurt her and he lets her know that he drinks animal blood and it was Damon (Ian Somerhalder) who killed all those people. Elena is still freaked out though and she asks him to leave.

Damon is at the cemetery trying to cover his tracks after killing Vicki's (Kayla Ewell) friends. He calls Stefan asking for his ring while he douses the bodies with alcohol to burn them. Stefan says he will give Damon his ring back but not right away. They hang up and when he goes to Vicki to douse her too, she wakes up.

The next day Elena meets Stefan at a public place to talk things over. Stefan answers her questions referring to vampires but she is mad at how he let Damon play with Caroline (Candice Accola) like that. Stefan agrees that it was not right but it is more dangerous to forbid Damon to do something. He also tells her that years ago, people in Mystic Falls knew about vampires but because it did not end well so he asks her not to tell anyone. Elena is not sure about that but she agrees to give him one day to convince her not to do it.

Sheriff Forbes (Marguerite MacIntyre) and Logan (Chris Johnson) find the bodies and they know that what killed them was a vampire. Logan informs her that he managed to take the Gilbert watch and now they have to take it to the Mayor (Robert Pralgo). The Mayor gets the watch and fits it into one of the other antiques, he says that it is ready and he hands it back to Logan.

Damon is trapped at the house since he cannot get out to the sunlight and he is getting impatient waiting for Stefan to bring him his ring. He brought Vicki at the house who is lying on the couch. He decides to feed her his blood even though he says that he will regret it. Vicki feels much better after drinking the blood and the two of them have fun around the house dancing and drinking. Then, Damon unexpectedly snaps Vicki's neck.

Stefan takes Elena into the woods where his house had been and he continues telling her about his past. While he talks, we get another flashback with him, Katherine and Damon. The two brothers play football and Katherine interrupts them. She flirts with Stefan, takes the ball and runs making the two brothers chase her. At another scene, Katherine says that she needs a date for the Founder's Ball and both brothers offer themselves with pleasure (hinting the brother's future rivalry).

Back in the present, Stefan tells Elena that Katherine chose him to escort her at the Founder's Ball. Damon was not mad with her choice because he does not get mad but instead gets even. Stefan tells Elena that the night he took Katherine to the Ball, Damon was also with her. Back in 1864, where Katherine and Stefan are together in bed and it is revealed that Katherine was a vampire and she bites Stefan. The next morning, Stefan is horrified but she compels him not to say anything and she tells Stefan that the three of them (her, Stefan and Damon) will always be together. Stefan tells Elena that Katherine was controlling his mind and compelled both brothers not to tell each other the secret.

Vicki wakes up asking what happened. Damon tells her that she is dead since he killed her and he informs her that now she only has to feed on a human to complete the transition to become a vampire. Vicki does not believe Damon and she leaves to go to Jeremy (Steven R. McQueen). By the time she gets there, her eyes burn, the sun bothers her, she has a headache, and she is hungry. Jeremy thinks she is high and because of her strange behavior, he calls Matt (Zach Roerig).

Matt gets there but he cannot do much to help Vicki when Stefan and Elena arrive. Stefan realizes what is happening and he compels Vicki to calm down and tells her that everything will be fine. He then explains to Elena and tells her that Vicki has to feed on human blood otherwise she will die. Jeremy and Vicki are alone in his room but she runs away when she feels the need to bite him. Stefan says he can track her and leaves to find her.

When it gets dark, Damon leaves the house and goes to Elena's house. He sees that she is afraid of him and he figures out that Stefan told her about them being vampires. He reassures her that he is not there to hurt her but he is looking for Stefan. Since Stefan is not there, he leaves asking Elena to tell Stefan that he is looking for him in case she sees him. Meanwhile, Logan uses the Gilbert watch as a compass searching for something.

Stefan finds Vicki crying. She starts remembering things and now she knows what is happening to her. Stefan promises that he can help her but Logan arrives and shoots him with wooden bullets. Logan is about to stake Stefan but Vicki pushes him away and Damon gets there and kills Logan. He then takes the bullet out of Stefan and he notices that it is wooden and realizes that people know about them. He takes his ring back and Vicki feeds on Logan, completing the transition.

Stefan returns to Elena, explains what happened and he apologizes for not being able to save Vicky. Elena promises that she will not tell anyone about him being a vampire but not wanting to deal with the drama, she breaks up with him and the episode ends with her crying inside her house.

== Featured music ==
These songs can be heard on the episode "Lost Girls":

- "The Weight of the World" by Editors
- "Stood Up" by A Fine Frenzy
- "Fader" by The Temper Trap
- "Enjoy the Silence" by Anberlin
- "Down" by Jason Walker
- "21 Guns" by Green Day
- "The Weight of Us" by Sanders Bohlke

== Reception ==
=== Ratings ===
In its original American broadcast, "Lost Girls" was watched by 3.88 million, up by 0.36 from the previous episode.

=== Reviews ===
"Lost Girls" received mostly positive reviews.

Lauren Attaway from Star Pulse gave the episode a B+ rate saying that it excelled because the series reached to a turning point.

Robin Franson Pruter from Forced Viewing rated the episode with 4/4 saying that this episode was the one who convinced her that the series was going to work. "The show flashes back to 1864 in an exciting and thematically rich episode. [...] It is the first unequivocally good episode of the series (“Friday Night Bites” was marginal). It’s not perfect [...] However, there’s so much good stuff in the episode that it far outweighs the flaws." She closes her review with: "Overall, “Lost Girls” is visual, exciting, and multi-layered, an episode that makes the audience want to know more about the characters and to tune in to discover what happens next."

Matt Richenthal of TV Fanatic stated: "From Elena discovering the Salvatore secret, to Vicki transitioning into a vampire, "Lost Girls" was the most significant episode of this CW hit to date."

Jen Yamato of HitFix said that it was the best episode yet. "In the best episode yet, truths are told, vampires are made, people die AND Ian Somerhalder dances around the living room with his shirt unbuttoned – what more can you ask for?"

Popsugar from Buzzsugar gave a good review to the episode saying that it was one of her favorites because of the action and the flashbacks. "One of my favorite scenes this week? The dance-like-no-one's-watching sequence for Damon and Vicki. (Except I was watching. And I loved it.) Their slow dance scene is actually pretty cute, too; until, well, Damon breaks Vicki's neck."

Lucia of Heroine TV congratulates the creators (Siega, Williamson and Plec) of this stellar episode. "I wouldn’t necessarily say that I liked it more than last week’s, but I thoroughly enjoyed it, and was left wanting more. Is it next week already? This show makes me impatient."
