= You're Undead to Me =

- The Vampire Diaries episode
- Episode no.: Season 1 Episode 5
- Directed by: Kevin Bray
- Written by: Sean Reycraft; Gabrielle Stanton
- Production code: 2J5004
- Original air date: October 8, 2009

Guest appearances
- Chris Johnson as Logan Fell; Chris William Martin as Zach Salvatore; Marguerite MacIntyre Liz Forbes; Jasmine Guy as Sheila Bennett

Episode chronology
| ← Previous "Family Ties" | Next → "Lost Girls" |
- The Vampire Diaries season 1

"You're Undead to Me" is the fifth episode of the first season of the American supernatural teen drama television series The Vampire Diaries. It aired on The CW on October 8, 2009. The episode was written by producer Sean Reycraft and consulting producer Gabrielle Stanton, and directed by Kevin Bray.

== Plot ==
Damon (Ian Somerhalder) has been locked up at the basement for three days now, and Stefan (Paul Wesley) checks on him and tries to reeducate him. Stefan also took Damon's ring that protects him from going out to the sun and he warns Zach (Chris William Martin) to stay away from the basement.

Elena (Nina Dobrev) surprisingly finds Vicki (Kayla Ewell) in the bathroom, she having spent the night with Jeremy (Steven R. McQueen). Later, Elena asks Jenna (Sara Canning) if she knows about it but Jenna says she is fine with it. Jenna asks about Stefan and Elena admits that she has not heard from him for three days.

At school, Caroline (Candice Accola) organizes a wash car fundraiser and informs Elena and Bonnie (Kat Graham) about it. Stefan arrives and Caroline asks where Damon is. Stefan only tells her that he left and he will not be coming back. Later at the Mystic Grill, a stranger (Bob Banks) sees Stefan and is convinced that they have met before. He says that Stefan has not aged at all and even Stefan tells Elena that the stranger must be mistaking him for someone else, but she is not convinced. She asks about him but Stefan denies to answer, something that makes Elena upset with him, and she leaves without him.

Stefan, to make up to Elena, prepares her favorite dinner, while at the same time sharing more of his story about Katherine and what his likes are. Elena tries to help him with the preparation but she cuts her finger. Stefan's face changes because of the blood smell and Elena catches a glimpse of his face as it reflects in the window. She tries to see if he is fine but Stefan manages to regain control before he faces her again.

Vicki and Jeremy hang out in his room where she finds Elena's pain medicine from the car crash. Later, Vicki takes Jeremy to her favorite hangout, the cemetery. Her friends are there and when she passes them Elena's pills, which she took from the house without telling Jeremy, he gets mad, takes the pills back and leaves.

At the car wash fundraiser, Bonnie is annoyed by Tiki's (Brandi Coleman) attitude and, without knowing how she did it, uses her powers to make the water hose explode in Tiki's face. When later Tiki puts her on sweeper duty, Bonnie ignites a stream of water and Tiki's car gets set on fire. Stefan manages to stop her before it is burned completely and Bonnie tells him not to tell anyone what happened. Bonnie later goes to her grandmother (Jasmine Guy) and tells her that she does not know what is happening to her.

In the meantime, Elena sees the stranger again while she is tending the cash table and asks him about Stefan. The man tells her that he stayed at the Salvatore boarding house and met Stefan in 1953 and that Stefan's uncle was attacked by an animal back then. Elena approaches Logan (Chris Johnson) and asks him if she can use the station's news archives. Logan tells her that of course she can and also arranges a dinner with Jenna at her place, where his goal is to get the Gilbert watch.

Elena goes through the archives to research the attack and finds a video report. She plays it and is stunned to see someone who looks just like Stefan standing in the background. She tries to understand how he cannot be aging and starts putting the pieces together. But she is not willing to believe what is in front of her, so she decides to ask Stefan straight about it and leaves to find him at his house.

Meanwhile, Damon tries to compel Caroline from his cell so she can come and free him. Caroline starts seeing visions of Damon and hearing his voice. She ends up at the Salvatore house and opens the door to Damon's cell. Zach gets there and struggles to shut the door while telling Caroline to run. Unfortunately, Damon snaps Zach's neck and chases after Caroline but she manages to get out of the house before he reaches her since he cannot go out into the daylight without his ring.

Back at the Gilbert house, Logan searches Jeremy's room and finds the watch. He takes it and on his way out runs into Jeremy. He tells him that he was looking for the bathroom so Jeremy will not suspect anything and manages to get out with the watch.

Vicky and her friends are still at the cemetery. Vicki goes to the car to turn the music back on and sees a man leaning against the car. She asks if he is okay and gets close to him, but it turns out to be Damon, who attacks her.

Stefan gets back home and finds Zach dead. He immediately retrieves a stake and runs to find Damon but the moment he opens the door Elena is standing there, frighteningly asking him: "What are you?"

== Feature music ==
In "You're Undead to Me" we can hear the songs:

- "Beauty of the Dark" by Mads Langer
- "Don't Trust Me" by 3OH!3
- "Be There" by Howie Day
- "When a Heart Breaks" by S.O.Stereo
- "Wait It Out" by Imogen Heap
- "Boom" by Anjulie
- "Save the Lies" by Gabriella Cilmi
- "This Year's Love" by David Gray

== Reception ==
=== Ratings ===
In its original American broadcast, "You're Dead to Me" was watched by 3.52 million; slightly down from the previous episode by only 0.01.

=== Reviews ===
"You're Undead to Me" received generally positive reviews.

Matt Richenthal and Steve Marsi from TV Fanatic gave good reviews to the episode saying: "Another Thursday night, another great episode of The Vampire Diaries" and "The Vampire Diaries never disappoints. Least of all tonight" respectively.

Popsugar of Buzzsugar gave a good review to the episode saying that the show has become a reason to stay home on Thursday nights. "It seems like we've reached a pretty big climax in the show: Damon has just asserted himself as a pretty evil villain, while Elena had that oh-so-important realization of every young vampire's love interest: The Epiphany."

Josie Kafka of Doux Reviews gave a mixed review to the episode rating it with 2.5/4 and stating: "This was one of those transition episodes, building up towards Stefan’s big reveal to Elena, building up to some resolution between Damon and Caroline, building up the Logan angle. It’s always hard to know what to say about these episodes."

Lucia from Heroine TV gave a good review saying that she loved the episode and can't wait for next week. "Previously, all hell broke loose, but that was nothing compared to this week. Damon escaped from his basement prison, Elena figured out that her boyfriend is a blood-sucking fiend, Bonnie almost killed people with her mind, Uncle Zach is dead, and Damon possibly killed Vicki. Also, there were several references to the Salvatore brothers’ Italian heritage."

Robin Franson Pruter from Forced Viewing rated the episode with 2/4 saying that it was bland. "The fifth episode of the series is a necessary but not particularly interesting one. [...] There’s nothing glaringly wrong with the episode. There’s just nothing special, nothing outstanding, nothing to excite the viewer. The episode is strangely flat. It features both big and small story developments, but nothing comes off as momentous or engaging."

== Book references ==
- Stefan tells Elena that the Salvatore family crest on his ring dates to the Italian Renaissance. In the novels, Stefan and Damon come from 15th century Florence.
- The Salvatore house is referred to as a boarding house in this episode, but is not run by the brothers' "uncle" but by an old woman called Mrs. Flowers, who is also a witch.
- In The Awakening, some Fell's Church teens go to the cemetery to party after the homecoming dance and Vickie is attacked there.
- In The Fury, Elena discovers that some of the town leaders are aware of the vampire problem and they are looking for the vampire's hideout, unaware that there's a vampire right under their noses.

== Trivia ==
- "You're dead to me" is an old English saying, meaning to disown the person it is spoken to.
- The vehicle that Tiki mocks as a "P.O.S." is a Ford Taurus. The vehicle Bonnie Bennett uses her Pyrokinesis on is a Volkswagen Jetta.
- Grams' house number is 2136.
- Tyler Lockwood does not appear once in this episode.
