= Family Ties (The Vampire Diaries) =

- The Vampire Diaries episode
- Episode no.: Season 1 Episode 4
- Directed by: Guy Ferland
- Written by: Andrew Kreisberg; Brian Young
- Cinematography by: Paul M. Sommers
- Editing by: Lisa Willinger
- Production code: 2J5003
- Original air date: October 1, 2009

Guest appearances
- Chris Johnson as Logan Fell; Chris William Martin as Zach Salvatore; Marguerite MacIntyre as Liz Forbes

Episode chronology
← Previous "Friday Night Bites"	Next → "You're Undead to Me"
- The Vampire Diaries season 1

"Family Ties" is the fourth episode of the first season of the American supernatural teen drama television series The Vampire Diaries. It aired on The CW on October 1, 2009. The episode was written by co-executive producer Andrew Kreisberg and staff writer Brian Young, and directed by Guy Ferland.

== Plot ==
The episode starts with Elena (Nina Dobrev) waking up to a noise. While trying to check where it's coming from, she sees on the news that she was found dead after an animal attack. Damon (Ian Somerhalder) appears and starts chasing her. Stefan (Paul Wesley) wakes up from his dream with Damon sitting next to him. As it appears, all of these were just things that Damon put into Stefan's head while he was sleeping. Damon also informs him that the police captured the animal that is responsible for the attacks since he decided to stay for a while at Mystic Falls and he covered his tracks.

Elena tries to polish a pocket watch from her family heirlooms because Mrs. Lockwood asked for it along with some other things for the Founders Council heritage display. Jeremy (Steven R. McQueen) gets upset when he hears that she is going to give it away and the two of them disagree about it. Stefan comes and Elena asks him to escort her to the Founder's Ball. At the same time, Damon compels Caroline (Candice Accola) to ask him at the Founder's Ball.

Tyler (Michael Trevino) is at the bar/restaurant where Vicki (Kayla Ewell) works, having dinner with his parents. When Vicki comes to their table, he acts like he does not know her. After his parents leave, he tries to talk to her but she is upset and brings up the Founder's Ball and how he did not ask her to escort him. Tyler asks her but Jeremy sees the whole conversation and tells her that he only asked her because she brought it up.

Bonnie (Kat Graham) talks with Caroline and encourages her to reveal the secret that Damon told her about Stefan because she is worried about Elena. Caroline reveals the secret and Bonnie tells Elena later about it, planting the suspicion that Stefan may be concealing the truth about his relationship with Katherine. Elena tells her that this is Damon's side of the story.

At the Salvatore house, Zach (Chris William Martin) asks Damon why he came back, which makes Damon angry and he attacks Zach. Stefan intervenes between the two men and when Damon leaves, Zach encourages Stefan to use vervain on Damon to weaken him so he can fight him. Stefan tries to put it in Damon's drink but he fails since Damon figures it out and doesn't take a drink.

Tyler arrives at the Gilbert house to get the box with the donated items his mother needs for the Founder's Ball. Elena gives it to him but later, Mrs. Lockwood calls to tell Elena that the pocket watch was not among the items. Elena says she will look for it and bring it to the Ball. She goes to Jeremy's room and accuses him of stealing it. Jeremy denies that he took it but he eventually gives it back to Elena telling her that he only took it because their father was going to give it to him. Feeling bad, Elena decides to return the watch to Jeremy before she leaves for the Ball.

At the Founder's Ball, an ex-boyfriend of Jenna's (Sara Canning), Logan Fell (Chris Johnson), the town's news reporter attempts for reconciliation but Jenna turns him down because he was the reason she left Mystic Falls in the first place. He is persistent and at the end of the Ball, Jenna agrees to meet him for dinner.

Damon wants to stay alone with Elena so he asks Caroline to ask Stefan for a dance. When they stay alone, he apologizes for his behavior at the game and explains that the Salvatore brothers are cursed with sibling rivalry. He shares with her the history of the "first" Salvatore brothers and the woman they both loved. Elena tells Damon that she does not want to be in the middle of their rivalry and she leaves. While dancing with Stefan, she asks about his past with Katherine but he refuses to tell her anything. Frustrated, Elena leaves him alone on the dance floor believing that what Bonnie told her might be true.

Damon reveals the true motive for attending the Founder’s Ball when he retrieves a crystal hidden in a wooden box in the Heritage Display. Caroline tries to prevent him from stealing it but Damon explains that is not stealing since he is the one who put it there a long time ago.

Meanwhile, Bonnie amazes herself when she can light every candle in the dining room using her powers. Elena sees the bite marks on Caroline's body and questions her about them. Caroline says that Damon did not intend to hurt her and leaves. Elena goes straight to Damon to warn him to stay away from Caroline and then goes to Stefan to apologize for her behavior earlier. She tells him about Caroline and what Damon is doing to her but Stefan reassures her that he is handling it.

Having removed Caroline from view, Damon sinks his teeth into her neck but after drinking from her, he collapses onto the grass in agony. Stefan appears and he confesses that since he could not spike Damon's drink with vervain, he spiked Caroline’s, knowing Damon would bite her. Stefan carries Damon, who is too weak to resist, to the basement of their house and locks him there to protect Elena from him.

The episode ends with Mr. and Mrs. Lockwood, Sheriff Forbes, and Logan Fell gathered together to discuss the pocket watch that Elena did not bring to the Ball and that they needed it. They ask Sheriff Forbes if she is sure about what is going on, and she says yes since all five dead bodies were drained of blood. Logan says: "They've come back" (hinting something about the four of them).

== Feature music ==
In "Family Ties" we can hear the songs:

- "Believer" by Viva Voce
- "Back in Time" by V V Brown
- "Shadows of Ourselves" by Thievery Corporation
- "I'm a Lady" by Santigold
- "Opposite Direction" by Union of Knives
- "I'm Not Over" by Carolina Liar
- "All We Are" by Matt Nathanson
- "Fallout" by Sofi Bonde
- "Wild Place" by Glass Pear
- "Brightest Hour (Morgan Page Remix)" by The Submarines

== Reception ==
=== Ratings ===
In its original American broadcast, "Family Ties" was watched by 3.53 million; down by 0.28 from the previous episode.

=== Reviews ===
"Family Ties" received positive reviews, with many of the critics commenting on the surprising ending of the episode.

Lauren Attaway of Star Pulse gave a B rate to the episode stating: "In true cliffhanger style, we learned that several prominent members of the community knew about vampires and had a plan to get rid of them. Elena's parents were supposed to be loaning several items to The Founder's Party for a display, and the one item Elena didn't loan out, a watch, is the item the adults need for some plot against the vampires. It was good to see that multiple victims drained of blood raised someone's suspicions."

Lucia from Heroine TV stated that the episode was awesome and it was her favorite so far. "I have become completely unabashedly obsessed with this show, and am loving all the new mythology we are learning. Since a lot of this is very different from the books, it is exciting and surprising. Kudos to Andrew Kreisberg and Brian Young, who wrote this episode. Also, the Twilight cracks were HI-larious."

Zeba of Two Cents TV gave a good review to the episode saying that it got more sinister than the last. About the ending, she states that the final exchange "manages to take this episode from an "eh" to an "OH SNAP." and she comments: "Did you see that coming? I must say I was thoroughly delighted by this new development. We’ve seen vampire shows where the vampire world is either very much out there (a la True Blood), or very underground. I can only imagine what’s in store for this series if some sort of witch hunt goes down. A show is always more interesting when there’s more than one threat for the characters to deal with."

Tiffany Vogt of The TV Watchtower gave a good review and also commented at the ending of the episode: "At first, I was not sure why so much effort and time was being given to Jenna and Logan and why it was so necessary for her to forgive him so quickly. Every time he begged for her to forget the past and take him back, I felt ready to slap him. But all was explained in that last scene as we watched Caroline’s mom (the sheriff) tell Mayor Lockwood, his wife, and Logan, "Five bodies drained of blood, I’m certain – they’ve come back." Those words were chilling. Who are these people and what on earth are they up to?!"

SB from Give Me My Remote also gave a good review to the episode saying that she really enjoyed it and that it was seriously funny. "I can’t believe we’re only four episodes into this season, because I’m already so invested in the characters, including the side characters, and the story is both getting set up and moving along nicely. I thought this episode was a good balance of having plenty going on, but remaining focused and not having an overwhelming amount of things happening. And it’s just building up nicely."

Frankie Diane Mallis from First Novels Club gave a good review to the episode saying that it "rocked" and she was surprised by the end. "OMG they need that pocket watch for some kind of anti-vampire mojo, and Caroline's Kyle XY Mom, Tyler's creepy parents, and Aunt Jenna's News Anchor ex are in on it! OMG!"
