= 162 Candles =

- The Vampire Diaries episode
- Episode no.: Season 1 Episode 8
- Directed by: Rick Bota
- Written by: Barbie Kligman; Gabrielle Stanton
- Cinematography by: Paul M. Sommers
- Editing by: Joshua Butler
- Production code: 2J5007
- Original air date: November 5, 2009

Guest appearances
- Arielle Kebbel as Lexi Branson; Marguerite MacIntyre as Liz Forbes; Bianca Lawson as Emily Bennett; Jasmine Guy as Sheila Bennett

Episode chronology
← Previous "Haunted"	Next → "History Repeating"
- The Vampire Diaries season 1

"162 Candles" is the eighth episode of the first season of the American supernatural teen drama television series The Vampire Diaries. It aired on The CW on November 5, 2009. The episode was written by co-executive producer Barbie Kligman and consulting producer Gabrielle Stanton, and directed by Rick Bota.

== Plot ==
The episode starts with Stefan (Paul Wesley) waking up at the living room and hearing noises in the house. He thinks that is Damon (Ian Somerhalder) but it is really his old friend Lexi (Arielle Kebbel) who came to celebrate his birthday. Stefan is happy to see her and he tells her about the recent happenings in Mystic Falls, including Elena (Nina Dobrev) but he does not mention that Elena looks exactly like Katherine.

At the police station, Sheriff Forbes (Marguerite MacIntyre) interrogates everyone about Vicki's (Kayla Ewell) disappearance. Stefan and Elena match their stories that Stefan was just trying to help her with her drug issues, Jeremy (Steven R. McQueen) only remembers the things Damon compelled him to remember and Matt (Zach Roerig) does not know anything other than what Jeremy told him. Matt and Jeremy believe she just left town and even Sheriff is not convinced, there is nothing more she can do. When the interrogations are over, Elena tells Stefan that they should stay away from each other.

Sheriff Forbes works late when Damon arrives at her office to bring her a package (supposedly from uncle Zach) that contains vervain. The Sheriff believes that Zach is out of town, as Damon made them believe, and now he tries to make the members of the council trust him and offers his help. That way, he can learn more things about the council and what they know.

Bonnie (Kat Graham) visits Elena at her bedroom who is down after her break up with Stefan. Bonnie tries to cheer her up by showing her a trick her grandmother taught her and she tells her that she is truly a witch. Bonnie is afraid that Elena will not believe her but Elena does.

Damon runs into Caroline (Candice Accola) who is still mad at him after the way he treated her. He compels her to throw a party and he also asks her to get his crystal back from Bonnie. Caroline says that she will do it.

At the Salvatore house, Stefan and Lexi talk about Elena when Damon shows up to invite them to Caroline's party later. Stefan is not in the mood of partying but Lexi convinces him that they should go. While Stefan gets into the shower, Elena knocks on the door and Lexi calls her in. Lexi is shocked seeing how much she looks like Katherine and Elena is surprised seeing Lexi in a towel and knowing Stefan is in the shower, believing that the two of them slept together and leaves. Lexi immediately runs back to the bedroom and ask Stefan what is wrong with him and why is he after a girl who looks like Katherine's twin sister. Stefan reassures her that Elena has nothing in common with Katherine and Lexi sees that Stefan is really in love with Elena.

Stefan stops by Elena's house before he goes to the party to ask her what she wanted to talk to him about. He realizes what Elena thought seeing Lexi and he explains that she is only a friend — his oldest friend — and she is in town for his birthday. Elena is relieved but she still does not want to go to Caroline's party and declines Stefan's proposal.

At the party, Caroline asks Bonnie for the crystal, but Bonnie does not give it back. Caroline tries to take it, but it shocks her the moment she touches it. The two of them argue and Bonnie leaves. When later Damon asks Caroline if she got his crystal back and she tells him no, he tells her that she is useless and shallow and leaves the bar. When he gets out he sees a young couple making out, he attacks them, kills the boy and compels the girl.

Elena changes her mind and arrives at the party seeing Lexi and Stefan having fun while playing pool. Lexi gets to the bar to order some drinks when she sees Elena. She approaches her and the two of them have a nice talk about Stefan making Elena relax a little bit about Stefan being a vampire, to give him some time and he will soon be totally himself around her. When Lexi goes back to Stefan, Stefan thanks her for what she did.

Sheriff Forbes finds the girl who survived Damon's attack and she asks her if she saw anything. The girl nods that she did and the Sheriff asks her to tell her everything.

Back at the party, a very drunk Caroline sits down with Matt who offers to take her back home. On their way out, they run into the Sheriff who sees that her daughter is drunk. She thanks Matt for offering to take her home and she gets back to work.

Elena finally decides to go and talk to Stefan while Lexi talks with Damon at the bar and asks him why he really is in town. Damon admits that he has a diabolical plan but he refuses to reveal it to her. While they are talking, Sheriff brings in the girl from the attack, who points to Lexi as her attacker. Sheriff walks up to Lexi and injects her with vervain. The cops drag Lexi out of the bar and Stefan, who saw everything, tries to get out to see what is happening.

Lexi throws off the men holding her and as she walks towards the Sheriff, Sheriff shoots her several times with wooden bullets but Lexi is strong and can handle the pain. Just as she is about to reach the Sheriff, Damon shows up and stakes her in heart. Lexi dies while Stefan and Elena watch from afar in shock. Damon whispers to Lexi before she dies that he did it because it was part of his plan. Sheriff thanks Damon for his help and asks him to put Lexi's body in the police car. Damon is relieved that his plan to throw the town off of his and Stefan's scent has worked.

Stefan is furious with Damon after killing Lexi and convinced that Damon will never change he tells Elena that he will go home and kill him. Elena tries to stop him because she knows that Stefan killing his brother will not do any good to him. She tells him that she will be there for him but he warns her to stay away.

Back at home, Stefan finds Damon waiting for him and the two of them get into a fight. Stefan stakes Damon, but not in the heart, telling him that now they are even; he saved his life once and now he spares his. Stefan walks away and Damon pulls the stake out of his body.

The episode ends with Bonnie having a nightmare of her running through a forest. She trips and falls and when she rises her eyes she sees her ancestor Emily (Bianca Lawson) warning her that "It's coming". Bonnie wakes up terrified but she is no longer in her bed but in the cemetery, at the Salvatore crypt.

== Feature music ==
In "162 Candles" we can hear the songs:

- "Yet" by Switchfoot
- "Love In Your Head" by The Black Box Revelation
- "All The World" by Fauxliage
- "Tokyo" by Telekinesis
- "Escape Me" by Tiësto
- "Feel It in My Bones" by Tiësto
- "Thinking of You" by Pete Yorn
- "Happy Birthday" by The Birthday Massacre
- "Too Close" by Mike Sheridan & Mads Langer

== Reception ==
=== Ratings ===
In its original American broadcast, "162 Candles" was watched by 4.09 million; down by 0.09 from the previous episode.

=== Reviews ===
"162 Candles" received positive reviews by critics.

Matt Richenthal from TV Fanatic gave a good review to the episode saying that "...it started out slow, but when the action picked up, it really picked up!"

Josie Kafka of Doux Reviews rated the episode with 3/4 saying that despite the surprising death of a new character [Lexie] we were just getting to know, the episode was "pretty damn good".

Lucia from Heroine TV also gave a good review to the episode saying: "...this was another thoroughly entertaining episode, with great moments for all the characters involved — even my often-neglected favorites, Matt and Bonnie (hurrah for screen time!). Thank you, show, for continuing to be surprisingly awesome."

Popsugar of Buzzsugar gave a good review to the episode stating: "From the looks of the preview, I definitely thought this week would just be a filler episode, but it managed to keep up the pace of last week's super intense and amazing Haunted."

Despite the positive reviews, Robin Franson Pruter of Forced Viewing rated the episode with only 1/4 saying: "A few good moments can’t buoy an episode sunk by the failure of its main story. [...] "162 Candles" remains the weakest episode of the series to date."
