= Against the Wall (TV series) =

2011 American police drama TV series

- Against the Wall title card
- Genre: Police procedural; Drama
- Created by: Annie Brunner
- Starring: Rachael Carpani; Kathy Baker; Marisa Ramirez; Brandon Quinn; Mayko Nguyen; Andrew W. Walker; Chris Johnson; Treat Williams
- Country of origin: United States
- Original language: English
- No. of seasons: 1
- No. of episodes: 13

Production
- Executive producer: {{{wrap}}}
- Producers: Annie Brunner; Mark Israel; Laurence Walsh; Terry Gould; Paul M. Leonard
- Running time: 43 minutes
- Production companies: Universal Cable Productions; Paid My Dues Productions; Open 4 Business Productions

Original release
- Network: Lifetime
- Release: July 31 – October 23, 2011

Against the Wall is an American police drama television series created by Annie Brunner. The series stars Rachael Carpani as Abby Kowalski, a police detective who recently joined the Internal Affairs division of the Chicago Police Department.

The series was broadcast in the United States on the cable channel Lifetime, and is a production of Universal Cable Productions. It premiered on July 31, 2011, following Drop Dead Diva.

== Overview ==
The series follows Abby Kowalski, a five-year veteran of the Chicago Police Department, who in order to pursue her dream career as a detective takes the only opening available—in the Internal Affairs Division. Abby's decision to join the department's internal affairs division puts her at odds with members of her own family, themselves members of the Chicago Police Department. Now Abby must find a way to do her job as an IAD detective without tearing her family apart.

== Cast and characters ==
=== Main ===
- Rachael Carpani as Abby Kowalski: A fourth generation Chicago police officer whose father and three older brothers are also members of the CPD. She takes an opening in the department's Internal Affairs Division as a detective, and is involved in a two relationships at the same time, one with her brother Richie's partner John Brody and the other with Danny Mitchell.
- Andrew W. Walker, as John Brody "Brody": A Chicago police officer, he is Richie Kowalski's partner and is involved in a relationship with Abby.
- Marisa Ramirez as Lina Flores: A Chicago police detective assigned as Abby's partner in the Internal Affairs Division. She is married to a fellow cop and has three sons including a set of twin boys. In the season one finale she gives birth to a baby girl, whom Abby delivers in an elevator, and names her Carlina.
- Brandon Quinn as Richie Kowalski: A Chicago police officer in the Bureau of Patrol and Abby's youngest older brother. Richie is the closest to Abby since they are the youngest in the family. Richie is married to a woman named Laura and they are expecting a baby.
- Kathy Baker as Sheila Kowalski: The wife of Don Kowalski and mother of Abby, Richie, Donnie and Steve Kowalski. Near the end of season one she opens her own bakery, hiring ex-convicts as her staff.
- Mayko Nguyen as Mackie Phan: Abby Kowalski's best friend and neighbor. She helped Abby's mother open her own bakery.
- Chris Johnson as Danny Mitchell: An old friend of Abby's who used to work in the State's Attorney's office. He later becomes involved with Abby and competes with Brody to win her heart.
- Treat Williams as Don Kowalski: A Chicago police sergeant in the Bureau of Patrol. He is a third generation cop and is married to Sheila Kowalski. He is the adoptive father of Donnie and father of Steve, Richie and Abby.

=== Recurring ===
- Daniel Kash as Lieutenant Papadol: A Chicago police lieutenant. He is Abby Kowalski's superior officer in the Internal Affairs Division. He hails from Toronto, Canada and can be seen with a Tim Hortons mug on his desk.
- James Thomas as Donnie Kowalski: A Chicago police officer and Abby Kowalski's oldest brother. He was fathered by a man named "Speedo" with Sheila, prior to her meeting Don Kowalski, who subsequently adopted him. He tests for and transfers into the Chicago P.D. SWAT team. Donnie is recently divorced and has taken an interest in Abby's best friend Mackie.
- Steve Byers as Steve Kowalski: A Chicago police officer in the Bureau of Patrol and Abby Kowalski's middle older brother. Steve is married and has two little girls.
- Chris Mulkey as Carl Scott: A Chicago police detective assigned to the Internal Affairs Division. He is the investigating officer of the officer-involved shooting case involving Richie Kowalski.

== Development and production ==
On June 23, 2010, Lifetime placed a pilot order for Against the Wall. Annie Brunner wrote the pilot, Dean Parisot was attached to the project as the director, with Nancy Miller serving as executive producer and Annie Brunner as supervising producer. However, Dean Parisot was forced to pull out of directing the pilot due to the death of his wife; he was replaced by Michael Fresco.

Casting announcements began in September 2010, with Rachael Carpani first to be cast, Carpani was cast as Abby Kowalski, "a policewoman who causes a rift with her three cop brothers when she decides to join the department's Internal Affairs Division." Next to join the series was Treat Williams as Don Kowalski, Abby's father, "an old-school career Chicago cop who is rough around the edges but has a real soft spot for his only daughter" until she tells him of her new job. Kathy Baker was next to be cast as Sheila Kowalski, Abby's mother, a Chicago cop's wife. Marisa Ramirez, Brandon Quinn, and Chris Johnson, were the last actors to be cast, with Ramirez playing Lina Flores, Abby's new partner at Internal Affairs, Quinn playing Richie Kowalski, Abby's younger brother, a Chicago Patrol Officer, and Johnson playing Danny Mitchell, Abby's longtime friend, who is also a lawyer.

The network green lighted the series on February 7, 2011, with an order of 13 hour-long episodes. The series is produced by Universal Cable Productions.

== Episodes ==
No.	Title	Directed by	Written by	Original release date	U.S. viewers (millions)
1	"Pilot"	Michael Fresco	Annie Brunner	July 31, 2011	1.78
Detective Abby Kowalski has to juggle her first day on the job as a detective in the Internal Affairs Division while dealing with the fallout from her family of cops for choosing a career in IAD. Abby's first case with Internal Affairs involves investigating an officer's involvement in a barroom brawl.
2	"A Good Cop"	Vincent Misiano	Annie Brunner	August 7, 2011	1.77
Abby Kowalski and Lina Flores attend the scene of an officer-involved shooting only to discover that the officer in question is Abby's brother, Richie Kowalski. After being reassigned to another case, Abby has to uncover the identity of a mole inside the Organized Crime Bureau, while she also keeps a close eye on her brother's case.
3	"We Have a Cop in Trouble Here"	John Terlesky	Nancy Miller	August 14, 2011	1.86
Abby and Lina begin an investigation when an ex-con makes a complaint claiming that he is being harassed by members of the Chicago Police Department. Detective Carl Scott propositions Abby in return for revealing details on her brother's case.
4	"The Fifth Body"	Artie Mandelberg	Wade Soloman & Megan Lynn	August 21, 2011	1.82
Abby and Lina conduct an investigation into alleged improprieties in the coroner's office after the body of a murder victim goes missing, only to appear in an online video that goes viral.
5	"Baby, Did a Bad Thing"	Norberto Barba	Denitria Harris-Lawrence	August 28, 2011	1.86
The investigation of the homicide of a stripper is kicked to IAD and assigned to Abby and Lina when it is revealed that she was killed at a "members only" club for cops. Richie finds out about Brody and Abby's sexual relationship.
6	"Obsessed and Unwanted"	Timothy Busfield	Laurence Walsh	September 4, 2011	1.76
Abby and Lina are assigned to investigate an officer who has been accused of stalking the psychiatrist assigned to him by the department. However, when she gets shot they re-focus the investigation onto the victim's husband. Richie is assigned a new partner who used to ride with his father.
7	"Countdown to Meltdown"	Kate Woods	Bob Lowry	September 18, 2011	1.88
After witnessing the poor response time from 911, after a man has a heart attack in front of Abby and Lina, the two detectives decide to investigate the backlog of complaints about delayed reaction times from 911. Donnie Kowalski tries out for the Chicago Police Department SWAT team.
8	"Memories We Fear"	Holly Dale	Benjamin Lobato	September 25, 2011	1.33
Abby and Lina investigate the erratic behavior of a crime scene photographer, which leads them to take over the investigation of a murdered model. Although, the case has Abby's remembering unpleasant stories her father told her about experiences he had.
9	"Lean on Me or Die"	Steven Robman	Mark Israel	October 2, 2011	1.48
Abby and Lina grow suspicious of Nikki, an undercover officer, who they suspect may be turning over to the dark side. Brody turns to Sheila for advice on how to woo Abby.
10	"Boys are Back"	Tricia Brock	Jessica Mecklenburg	October 9, 2011	1.55
The Kowalskis grow suspicious of Mackie's new boyfriend who is a former criminal that Don Kowalski put in prison a few years earlier. Abby and Lina investigate a case with a girl who was trampled during a convention, while they also investigate another case with a detective who fell from a balcony.
11	"Wonder What God's Up To"	Paul Shapiro	Nancy Miller & Denitria Harris-Lawrence	October 16, 2011	1.25
Abby and Lina investigate a complicated case involving the suicide of a police officer; Mackie and Abby's brothers plan a surprise party for Abby.
12	"Second Chances"	Gloria Muzio	Suzan Olson Davis	October 23, 2011	1.43
When Shelia hires ex-convicts in her bakery, Don starts to get worried about what the consequences could be for their family. Lina and Abby attempt to uncover what went wrong at a hazing of a recruitment academy in Chicago.
13	"We Protect Our Own"	Jeremiah S. Chechik	Annie Brunner	October 23, 2011	1.47
When Don's ex-partner Paul is investigated for the shooting of his wife, Abby and Lina look into who really did it, which may lead to Don's old cases being reopened. Meanwhile, Lina worries if her partnership with Abby will change after the birth of her baby, and Abby's relationships with Danny and Brody heat up.

== Reception ==
=== Critical reception ===
Against the Wall has received mixed or average reviews, earning a score of 59 on Metacritic. The New York Daily News said of the series: "Lifetime's new Against the Wall turns out to be first-rate drama. In fact, it's one of the best new shows of the year." The Los Angeles Times gave a positive review: "There's much here to suggest that, if everyone relaxes a little, good things will come." The Hollywood Reporter also gave the pilot a positive review:

But mostly Against the Wall is a pleasant surprise, with Carpani being a much bigger surprise. If Against the Wall can make its disparate parts work, it will be plenty more intriguing than a number of network procedurals. And in the cable game, that's already a victory.

=== Ratings ===
The pilot episode premiered with 1.8 million total viewers, scoring 0.9 million viewers in the 18–49 demographic and 0.6 million in the 25–54 demographic.

Season	Season Premiere			Season Finale		
Season	Date	Viewers Total (in millions)	Viewers 18–49	Date	Viewers Total (in millions)	Viewers 18–49
1	July 31, 2011	1.78	0.9	October 23, 2011	1.47	0.4
