= List of The Vampire Diaries characters =

Vampire diaries characters

The season six cast of the show from left to right: Kat Graham, Ian Somerhalder, Zach Roerig, Candice Accola, Michael Trevino, Steven R. McQueen, Matt Davis, Nina Dobrev, Michael Malarkey, and Paul Wesley

The Vampire Diaries is an American fantasy-drama television series which was first broadcast on The CW from 2009 to 2017, airing 171 episodes over 8 seasons. Kevin Williamson and Julie Plec adapted the television series from L.J. Smith's novel series of the same name. Some of the characters appeared in the spin-off series, The Originals and Legacies.

== Main cast ==
The following is a list of series regulars who have appeared in one or more of the series' eight seasons. The characters are listed in the order they were first credited in the series.

Key
Main cast
Recurring cast
Guest cast

Character	Actor	Seasons							
Character	Actor	1	2	3	4	5	6	7	8
Elena Gilbert	Nina Dobrev (Note: Nina Dobrev receives star billing for portraying Elena Gilbert, however her role as Katherine is only recurring in seasons 1, 3 & 4.)	Main	Main	Main	Main	Main	Main	Guest (Note: Uncredited voice role in season 7.)	Guest
Katherine Pierce	Nina Dobrev	Recurring	Main	Recurring	Recurring	Main			Guest
Stefan Salvatore	Paul Wesley	Main	Main	Main	Main	Main	Main	Main	Main
Silas	Paul Wesley				Main (Note: Paul Wesley did not play Silas until season 4, episode 19, which was his first appearance as him.) (Note: Several members of The Vampire Diaries cast (including Paul Wesley) played Silas as a recurring character who could change his appearance in season 4 until the finale.)	Main			
Damon Salvatore	Ian Somerhalder	Main	Main	Main	Main	Main	Main	Main	Main
Jeremy Gilbert	Steven R. McQueen	Main (Note: Steven R. McQueen was given starring credits from season 1, episode 1 to season 6, episode 21. In episode 22 of season 6, he was credited as a special guest star.)	Main	Main	Main	Main	Main		Special Guest
Jenna Sommers	Sara Canning	Main	Main	Guest		Special Guest			Special Guest
Bonnie Bennett	Kat Graham (Note: From season 1, episode 1 to season 2, episode 16, Kat Graham was credited as Katerina Graham.)	Main	Main	Main	Main	Main	Main	Main	Main
Caroline Forbes	Candice King (Note: From season 1, episode 1 to season 6, episode 22, Candice King was credited as Candice Accola.)	Main	Main	Main	Main	Main	Main	Main	Main
Matt Donovan	Zach Roerig	Main	Main	Main	Main	Main	Main	Main	Main
Vicki Donovan	Kayla Ewell	Main (Note: Kayla Ewell is credited as part of the main cast from episodes 1 to 7.)	Guest (Note: Uncredited.)	Recurring		Guest			Recurring
Tyler Lockwood	Michael Trevino	Main	Main	Main	Main	Main	Main	Special Guest	Special Guest
Alaric Saltzman	Matt Davis	Main (Note: For season 1, episodes 9 to 13, Matt Davis is credited as a special guest star. From season 1, episode 14 onwards, he is credited as part of the main cast.)	Main	Main	Guest	Special Guest	Main	Main	Main
Klaus Mikaelson	Joseph Morgan		Recurring	Main	Main	Special Guest		Special Guest	
Enzo St. John	Michael Malarkey					Recurring	Main	Main	Main

=== Elena Gilbert ===
- Played by Nina Dobrev
- Starring seasons: 1–6
- Voice only role season: 7
- Guest starring season: 8

=== Katherine Pierce ===
- Played by Nina Dobrev
- Starring seasons: 2-5
- Recurring seasons: 1
- Guest starring season: 8

Katherine Pierce (based on Katherine von Swartzschild from the novels) is the main antagonist of the series, being a major antagonist in the first, second, fourth, fifth and eighth seasons of the show and a minor antagonist/anti-hero in the third season. She is the ancestor and doppelgänger of Elena Gilbert and the doppelgänger of Tatia and Amara. Katherine Pierce, born as Katerina Petrova on June 5, 1473, to a Bulgarian family but was disowned after having a child out of wedlock. She fled from the Ottoman Empire and reached England, where she met Klaus Mikaelson and his brother Elijah, members of the Original Vampire Family. She was attracted to Elijah but was horrified when she found out that Klaus planned to sacrifice her for a ritual. So, she charmed Trevor, a young man, and used him as a means of escape. This led to him sending her to Rose-Marie (a vampire). Rose was shocked after hearing Trevor's betrayal and afraid of Klaus, told Katerina that she would turn her over to Klaus. This led to Katerina committing suicide, ultimately stabbing herself, forcing Rose to heal her with vampire blood. When Trevor arrived and Rose got distracted while talking to him, Katerina seized the opportunity and hung herself, successfully turning into a vampire by feeding on the human host of the house. Thereby sabotaging Klaus' plan because she was no longer human and her blood no longer was a viable component of the ritual to undo the curse. She then flees the place after taking a moonstone with her. Klaus was so infuriated with Katerina's sabotage that she was forced to live on the run for over 500 years as he hunted her down. In 1864, she arrived at Mystic Falls, staying with The Salvatores and gaining their trust. Eventually she lured both the Salvatore Brothers, played and used both them before feeding them her blood. Throughout the series, she claims that she loves Stefan Salvatore.

In season 4, Elena Gilbert forces the cure down Katherine's throat in act of revenge, and Katherine becomes human again. Katherine’s long lost daughter, Nadia Petrova finds Katherine after 500 years of searching for her. Katherine pushes her away at first. However, in season 5, after the Cure is removed from her system by Silas, Katherine begins to rapidly age and find out that she'll die soon. Katherine's daughter Nadia reminds her that she is the daughter of a Traveler. Katherine possesses the untapped powers and uses them to become a Passenger in Elena’s body, causing her to not have to age any longer as her body has already been buried. Katherine makes amends with Nadia on her death bed, after being bitten by the hybrid Tyler Lockwood. After being caught, Stefan kills Katherine with the Travelers' Knife, expelling Katherine from Elena's body. Rather than going to the Other Side, Katherine's soul is dragged into Hell, but not before she injects Elena's body with a compound to make her go crazy in a final effort to get revenge upon her. However, her plan is foiled when Stefan and Caroline manage to get a cure with the help of Enzo and the Travelers.

In season 8, Katherine is resurrected from Hell when the Maxwell Bell is rung 11 times by Matt Donovan. After Cade's death, Kai Parker reveals that Katherine has become the new Queen of Hell while Katherine herself reveals to Stefan and Damon that she has spent the years since her death manipulating Cade, causing his interest in them. Much like Cade, she is now only vulnerable to a dagger made out of her own bones, but it can only send her back to Hell, not permanently kill Katherine. With Vicki Donovan ringing the bell 12 times to destroy Mystic Falls with hellfire, the gang comes up with a plan to redirect the hellfire back into Hell and destroy it for good. As the hellfire is unleashed, Stefan sacrifices himself to kill Katherine a final time, sending her soul back to Hell where it is destroyed along with the realm by the hellfire that is redirected by Bonnie, bringing a final end to Katherine Pierce.

Notably Katherine and Elena are distinguished by the hair styling, Elena usually opts for straight hair in comparison to Katherine's waves.

=== Stefan Salvatore ===
- Played by Paul Wesley
- Starring seasons: 1-8

Stefan Salvatore (based on Stefan Salvatore from the novels) is the younger brother of Damon Salvatore, and the two were best friends in life. However, this changed when the brothers fell in love with Katherine Pierce. Once Stefan discovered Katherine was a vampire, Stefan was both scared and repulsed by Katherine and vampirism in general. Katherine, however, compelled Stefan to not be afraid of her, to keep her secret, and to drink her vampire blood against his will. Born and raised in Mystic Falls to Giuseppe Salvatore and Lily Salvatore, he died when he was young with Katherine's blood on his system and later shot by his own father, thus turning into a vampire one hundred and forty-five years prior to the beginning of the main storyline.

=== Silas ===
- Played by several cast members as illusions, true form played by Paul Wesley
- Starring season: 5
- Recurring season: 4

Silas is an ancient immortal Traveler witch and one of the world's first immortal beings. Unlike vampires, he is a true immortal alongside his love Amara. However, he was desiccated in ancient times and trapped on an island and sought to get free and find Amara. The true goal of the Brotherhood of the Five is to find Silas and bring a final end to him. Due to Nature's rules, over the millennia, a series of doppelgangers were created, born looking exactly identical to Silas and Amara and dying in their place. Stefan Salvatore is one of Silas' doppelgangers while Amara's include Katherine Pierce and Elena Gilbert.

In season four, Silas manipulates Professor Atticus Shane who visited Silas' resting place while grieving for his lost wife. Through Shane, Silas sets the stage for his return, including setting up several massacres so that Silas can create an Expression Triangle and bring down the Veil between life and the Other Side. After Jeremy Gilbert becomes one of the Brotherhood of the Five, he is able to complete his Hunter's Mark leading to Silas by killing Kol Mikaelson and thus all of the vampires in his bloodline. The group successfully finds Silas and the Cure to vampirism that he holds, but Katherine feeds Silas Jeremy's blood to fully revive him and Silas kills Jeremy. Taking on the form of Shane, who had actually died on the island, Silas manipulates Bonnie into doing his bidding by preying on her grief over the death of Jeremy. Silas' powers prove to be so great that not even Klaus Mikaelson, the Original Hybrid, is a match for him. Ultimately, Bonnie drops the Veil for Silas, but she uses dark magic to turn him to stone and Stefan attempts to drop Silas into a quarry after Bonnie raises the Veil once again. However, Bonnie dies in the process of resurrecting Jeremy, breaking her spell on Silas. Taking on the form of Elena, Silas explains to Stefan about the true nature of doppelgangers before turning into his true form, an exact likeness of Stefan and throwing Stefan into the quarry instead.

In season five, Silas poses as Stefan for months, killing Mayor Rudy Hopkins and seeking the Cure so that he can die and be at Peace with Amara. After discovering the truth, the Mystic Falls gang work to stop him, joined by the first witch Qetsiyah who had managed to resurrect herself while the Veil was down so that she could stop Silas in person. By drinking the blood of Katherine Pierce, who had taken the Cure, Silas is rendered mortal, but he still retains his immense other powers. Silas discovers that Amara is actually not dead, her death having been staged by Qetsiyah and transformed into the Anchor for the other side as a punishment. During Silas and Amara's reunion, she drinks Silas' blood in order to become mortal herself. After a struggle, Stefan manages to throw a knife into Silas' chest, killing him. Amara kills herself shortly thereafter, but not before Qetsiyah manages to transfer the Anchor to Bonnie, resurrecting her. Following his death, Silas is presumed to have reached Peace as he had desired.

In the season five finale, it's revealed that Silas had become stuck on the Other Side rather than reaching Peace. After searching for a Traveler who can teach them a resurrection spell, Enzo brings what at first appears to be Stefan to Bonnie, but it turns out to be Silas instead. Silas, who intends to be resurrected along with all of the fallen loved ones of the Mystic Falls gang, teaches Bonnie the Travelers' resurrection spell which she in turn passes on to Liv Parker. As he teaches Bonnie the spell, Silas gloats that he intends to resume his rampage and "kill a lot of people in an epic, all-inclusive way once I'm out of here." As the Other Side collapses, the souls trapped there start getting sucked into oblivion, including Silas. Bonnie initially reaches out to help Silas, before letting him go in revenge for his murder of her father. Silas is sucked into oblivion, bringing a final end to him.

=== Damon Salvatore ===
- Played by Ian Somerhalder
- Starring seasons: 1–8

Damon Salvatore (based on Damon Salvatore from the novels) is a vampire, turned by Katherine Pierce one hundred and forty-five years prior to the beginning of the main storyline. He is the son of the late Giuseppe Salvatore & Lily Salvatore and the older brother of Stefan Salvatore. He is also turned with Katherine's blood on his system and later shot by his own father along with Stefan. He is portrayed as a charming, handsome and snide person who loves tricking humans, and takes pleasure in feeding on them and killing them during the early episodes of the first season. His character is developed drastically during the course of the show, he becomes more compassionate after falling in love with Elena Gilbert.

=== Jeremy Gilbert ===
- Played by Steven R. McQueen
- Starring seasons: 1–6
- Special guest starring season: 8
- Legacies special guest starring season: 1

Jeremy Gilbert (loosely based on Margaret Gilbert from the novels) is Elena Gilbert's younger brother, later revealed to be her biological cousin.

==== In The Vampire Diaries ====
In the beginning of the series, Jeremy was emotionally damaged by the death of his parents and begins to use drugs. He was in love with Vicki Donovan, another drug user, causing a rivalry with her boyfriend, Tyler Lockwood. Vicki later breaks up with Tyler and starts a relationship with Jeremy. However, Jeremy witnesses Stefan kill Vicki (after Damon turned her into a vampire). At Elena's request, Damon makes Jeremy forget this, and Jeremy becomes more stable and stops using drugs. Jeremy then starts a relationship with a vampire named Anna, but John Gilbert, Jeremy's uncle, kills Anna at the end of season one. Jeremy tries to become a vampire by overdosing while having Anna's blood in his system, but he fails. He was later given John's ring, which protects him from a death caused by anything supernatural. In season two, Jeremy falls in love with Bonnie Bennett and they start a relationship. Jeremy later loses both his aunt and uncle on the day of the sacrifice, leaving Elena and himself without a guardian. In the season two finale, Jeremy was accidentally shot to death by Sheriff Forbes, but Bonnie was able to bring him back.

However, bringing Jeremy back from the dead allowed him to see and communicate with the ghosts of his former girlfriends, Anna and Vicki, whenever he thinks about them. When the doorway to the Other Side was opened, Jeremy was able to physically interact with Anna. Bonnie finds out, resulting in their break-up. When Bonnie closes the doorway to the Other Side, Jeremy and Anna decide to let each other go. After Jeremy kills a hybrid and was almost killed by Klaus, Elena asks Damon to compel Jeremy into leaving Mystic Falls in order to live a normal life. However, after Klaus and the other Originals find out where Jeremy was, Elena takes Jeremy back home.

In season four, a vampire hunter, Connor, arrives in town, and only Jeremy can see his mysterious tattoos, later revealed to be a map to the cure for vampirism. When Connor is killed, Jeremy becomes part of The Five, a group of vampire hunters, and his 'hunter's mark' grows when he kills vampires. His urge to kill grows as well, and he attempts to murder Elena. Eventually, he finds a way to control this, and Damon trains him. After killing Kol, resulting in the death of his entire bloodline, Jeremy's mark completes, revealing a map to the cure. However, once he and Bonnie reach Silas, Katherine reveals herself and allows Silas to feed on Jeremy in order to awaken. She steals the cure, and Jeremy is killed when Silas snaps his neck. Elena then burns the Gilbert house, creating a cover story for his death. When Bonnie drops the veil to the Other Side, Jeremy's ghost returns, saving Elena from Kol. Bonnie performs a spell that allows Jeremy to stay alive. The spell, however, killed Bonnie in the process, though Jeremy can see her ghost.

In season five, Jeremy attempts to keep Bonnie's death a secret for her in order to preserve her friends' happiness. However, Jeremy eventually reveals the truth to his friends. Bonnie and Jeremy are reunited after she becomes the new anchor to the Other Side, though she sacrifices her life once more in the finale to save Elena, Stefan, Enzo, Tyler and Alaric. It was revealed that Jeremy's supernatural hunter status was inactive as a result of the anti-magic barrier around the town.

In season six, Jeremy has become a drunk after Bonnie's death, paying her cell phone bill just to hear her voicemail recording. After Kai absorbed the Travelers' spell around Mystic Falls, Jeremy regained his hunter abilities. Later, Jeremy came to the conclusion that it was time for him to move on with his life and leave for Santa Fe, New Mexico. While nearly all of his friends and family are under the impression that Jeremy is going to art school there, in reality, Jeremy has moved there to hunt vampires, with only Alaric, who planned to feed him leads, knowing Jeremy's true plans. Jeremy returns in the series finale, shown teaching gifted youngsters how to defend themselves against the supernatural at the Salvatore School.

==== In Legacies ====
By the time of Legacies, Jeremy has left Alaric's school and resumed his work as a vampire hunter. After Landon Kirby and Rafael Waithe disappear, Alaric sends Jeremy to find them. Jeremy rescues the two from a werewolf hunter and brings them back to the school.

=== Jenna Sommers ===
- Played by Sara Canning
- Starring seasons: 1–2
- Guest starring seasons: 3, 5 and 8

Jenna Sommers (loosely based on Judith Maxwell from the novels) was Elena and Jeremy Gilbert's aunt. She was the sister of their mother, Miranda Sommers-Gilbert. After her sister and brother-in-law were killed in a car crash, she took over as Elena's and Jeremy's legal guardian and moved into the Gilbert family home. In the beginning, Jenna had trouble coping as an authority figure, having been a partying college student, but as the series progresses she becomes better at it. She begins dating news reporter Logan Fell, who had cheated on her in the past. However, Logan is turned into a vampire by Anna and then killed by history teacher Alaric Saltzman; Jenna is told that he left town. She later begins a relationship with Alaric.

In season two, John Gilbert begins to cause trouble between Jenna and Alaric, and Jenna suspects that Alaric is not completely honest with her. When Isobel Flemming, Alaric's supposed dead wife, shows up at Jenna's door, Jenna becomes angry with Elena and Alaric – who then tell her everything about vampires. Jenna is later turned into a vampire by Klaus, to be used in the sacrifice to release his werewolf side. She attempts to kill Greta Martin, Klaus' witch, to stop the sacrifice and saves Elena, at which point Klaus stakes her to death.

Later, Jenna is seen in the season finale, in flashbacks of the night Elena's parents' car went off Wickery Bridge. She is later seen as one of Katherine's hallucinations in season five. Jenna then appears in the series finale, where she and her family reunite with Elena in the afterlife.

=== Bonnie Bennett ===
- Played by Kat Graham
- Starring seasons: 1–8

Bonnie Sheila Bennett (based on Bonnie McCullough from the novels) is Elena's best friend. From season seven, she becomes one of two female leads. She is good friends with Elena Gilbert and Caroline Forbes. In the beginning of the series, Bonnie discovers that she is a witch born from a line of witches. Her grandmother, Sheila Bennett, helps her learn to use her powers. When her grandmother dies, Bonnie continues training and becomes more and more powerful. In the midst of season two, she starts a relationship with Jeremy Gilbert, Elena's younger brother. She later discovers, from warlock Luka Martin, that the only way to kill Klaus, the original vampire who wants to kill Elena, is for her to get the power of one-hundred dead witches. Once she does this, she pretends to be dead in a scheme of Damon's to trick Klaus. But when she brings Klaus to the brink of death, Elijah does not kill him, as planned, and carries Klaus away before Bonnie could react.

In the season two finale, Bonnie is able to save Jeremy from dying after she tells her dead ancestor Emily Bennett that she loves him. However, bringing Jeremy back from the dead allows him to see his dead ex-girlfriends. Bonnie later finds out that Jeremy kissed Anna when the doorway to the Other Side was temporarily opened, and she breaks up with him. Later on, Bonnie reconnects with her mother, Abby, who had abandoned her as a child, and who helps her to kill the original vampires. However, Abby is turned into a vampire by Damon and abandons Bonnie again. In the season three finale, Bonnie places Klaus' soul into Tyler's body, thus preventing him from being completely destroyed by Alaric and saving Tyler, Caroline, Damon, and Stefan from dying (as part of Klaus' bloodline). In the beginning of season four, Bonnie learns that there is a forbidden magic, but she is forced to use it to transfer Klaus back to his original body, as a result, angry spirits attack her grandmother's ghost.

Professor Atticus Shane mentors Bonnie in regaining her powers. However, unknown to her, this 'Art of Expression' draws magic from the spirits of a massacre. It is revealed that Bonnie is a key component to finding the cure, as she was a descendant of the witch who entombed Silas, and is the only one who can open the tomb. During the course of the fourth season, she becomes closer to Jeremy again, hinting at a possible reunion between the two. However, upon finding the cure, Jeremy is killed by Silas. Feeling unimaginable grief, Silas, posing as Shane, manipulates Bonnie into believing that she can bring him back from the dead, but only if she brings back every supernatural creature who has died. When Bonnie drops the veil to the Other Side, she is overpowered by Silas. Bonnie manages to petrify Silas. Afterwards, Bonnie is determined to bring Jeremy back to life, despite Sheila's warning. The spell ends up killing Bonnie, who awakens as a spirit. She eventually brings the veil back up, leaving Jeremy (who she resurrected) as the only one who can see her.

In season five, Bonnie is resurrected – but every supernatural who dies has to go through her to the afterlife, thus she feels the pain of their deaths. She and Damon are then trapped in another dimension together while the others think they are dead.

In season six, Bonnie and Damon develop a friendship and find out from a psychotic killer, Kai, that they can get home by using her magic. However, the plan backfires when Kai tries to kill Bonnie and she sacrifices herself for Damon, which sends him back home. Later, Kai also returns to the living world, leaving Bonnie all alone. Bonnie eventually manages to come home but has a more-violent disposition. She got revenge when she left Kai in a prison world but he returned, due to the Heretics. At the end of the season, she is linked to Elena through a spell Kai made that put Elena in a coma as long as Bonnie lives.

In season seven, Bonnie is more united with Damon and their relationship develops while she starts having feelings for Enzo. Her friendship with Damon ends because he left Bonnie while he desiccated himself in a coffin until Elena wakes, so Bonnie would never see him again. Three years later, she had a romantic relationship with Enzo. She discovers that the armory is looking for her so she hides with Enzo. They make a deal with Rayna, but she did not tell them that she was going to be the next huntress. When Bonnie woke up she tried to kill Damon, Enzo, and Caroline because Rayna marked them. She almost killed Enzo but Damon burned the last shaman in the armory so Bonnie was not the huntress anymore and saved Enzo. Finally, she forgave Damon.

By season eight, Enzo and Damon disappeared and Bonnie could not locate them, leaving her without two of the people she most cared about. Bonnie manages to rescue Damon and Enzo from Sybil's control using objects from the Armory, and resumes her relationship with Enzo. They plan for him to take the cure and live as humans together, but Stefan kills Enzo after his humanity shuts off. Bonnie injects him with the cure and her grief from Enzo's death causes her to unlock her psychic abilities. She manages to forgive Stefan and uses her power to see Enzo, but she breaks off the connection in order to channel her power into saving Caroline's twins. Inspired by her ancestors and Enzo, Bonnie gains new empowerment, saving Mystic Falls by redirecting Hellfire back to hell and destroying it along with Katherine. Her newfound strength allows her to break the spell over Elena and reunite with her best friend. Bonnie then fulfills her promise to Enzo to live her life, and leaves to travel the world as he watches over her.

=== Caroline Forbes ===
- Played by Candice King
- Starring seasons: 1–8
- The Originals recurring season: 5
- Legacies Episode: "Salvatore: The Musical!" (voice-over)

==== In The Vampire Diaries ====
Caroline Elizabeth Forbes-Salvatore (née Forbes) (based on Caroline Forbes from the novels) is Elena Gilbert and Bonnie Bennett's best friend. She was born in Mystic Falls, Virginia on October 10, 1992. Caroline is the daughter of the Sheriff of Mystic Falls, Liz Forbes, with whom she has a troubled relationship that develops into a more loving relationship. Her father, Bill Forbes, left her and her mother after coming out as gay before the start of the series. In season 1, she is shown as shallow and self-absorbed, control freak along with insecure and competitive towards Elena. She begins a relationship with Matt Donovan, their childhood friend.

In season 2, she is turned by Katherine Pierce as a part of her game play. Even though siding with Katherine for a few episodes because of fear, Caroline manages to become more strong and independent with the help of Stefan and her friends. Her relationship with Matt starts to fall apart after Caroline becomes a vampire and struggles to keep it a secret from Matt. Matt breaks up with her after knowing the truth and not being able to cope up with the fact that she is a vampire. After a while, she develops a close bond with Tyler Lockwood, due to their similarities as supernatural beings, helping him through his werewolf transition, which eventually leads to romantic feelings between them.

In season 3, she begins a relationship with Tyler as he becomes a hybrid. Initially, both of them hit of well. After the introduction of Klaus, he develops an interest in her, which sparks a complicated relationship between them. Caroline remains one of the most emotionally grounded characters, offering support to her friends during difficult times, especially to Elena as she deals with Stefan descending into darkness.

In season 4, Caroline continues her relationship with Tyler but faces complications due to Klaus’ obsession with her. Tyler eventually leaves town after being in a disagreement with Klaus and their relationship gets strained. During this time, she supports Elena with her transitioning to a vampire and her new reality. Caroline growing more stronger role becomes apparent as she takes more responsibility for her friends and stands up to The Originals.

In season 5, Caroline starts college with Elena and Bonnie. She faces heartbreak as her relationship with Tyler falls apart for good. She and her friends discover the existence the Augustine Society. The society is revealed to have a dark history of torturing vampires, and Caroline becomes increasingly involved in the investigation. They eventually learns that they’ve been experimenting a vampire named Enzo. She forms a love-hate bond with Enzo. She also struggles with the death of her close friend Bonnie and grows closer to Stefan. Caroline and Stefan’s bond deepens as they navigate through their individual losses. She also becomes entangled with the fallout of the Travelers and the collapse of the Other Side.

In season 6, Caroline experiences tremendous loss when her mother Sheriff Forbes dies from cancer. Struggling to cope, she turns off her humanity, leading to a dark period where forces Stefan to turn off his humanity and they both begin to act ruthlessly. Their both feelings grow stronger. After turning her humanity back on, they finally admit their love for each other. Caroline’s relationship with Stefan is a significant emotional development this season.

From season 7, Caroline becomes one of two female leads along with Bonnie Bennet. Her relationship with Stefan is complicated by the arrival of the Heretics and the return of Stefan’s first love, Valerie. She also becomes pregnant with Alaric’s twin daughters (as a surrogate) due to a magical baby transfer. During her delivery, Stefan gets marked by an hunter's sword trying to protect her and his friends from the hunters wrath. This prompts him to go on a running spree till the hunter is captured. This unexpected turn shifts her priorities, and she becomes a devoted mother figure. Her connection with Stefan endures, but their relationship faces several challenges due to their different paths.

In the final season, Caroline’s relationship with Stefan is at the forefront, and the two eventually get married. However, their happiness is short-lived as Stefan sacrifices himself to save Mystic Falls and his friends, leaving Caroline heartbroken. Despite her loss, Caroline remains strong for her daughters and plans to continue her work at the Salvatore School for the Young and Gifted, which she helps Alaric run. Her strength, compassion, and leadership define her by the end of the series.

Producers of the tv show have stated that Caroline was originally meant to end up with Klaus, however, due to the positive feedback from the fans when Caroline and Stefan begun dating, the plan changed.

==== In The Originals ====
In season five, Caroline tracks Klaus down at the request of Rebekah, getting him to contact Hope rather than continuing to cut himself off from his loved ones. Later, Klaus seeks Caroline's help to transfer the Hollow out of Hope and into himself so that Klaus can sacrifice himself to destroy the evil spirit and save his daughter.

==== In Legacies ====
Caroline is mostly absent from Legacies, stated to be recruiting for the school in Europe as well as looking for a solution to one of her daughters having to die in the Merge.

In the series finale, Caroline returns as Alaric prepares to shut down the school. After changing his mind, Alaric decides to retire as Headmaster and leave Caroline in charge. Later, Caroline and Hope welcome a new class of students to the school.

=== Matt Donovan ===
- Played by Zach Roerig
- Starring seasons: 1–8
- The Originals special guest starring season: 3
- Legacies special guest starring season: 1

Matthew G. "Matt" Donovan (based on Matthew Honeycutt from the novels) is Elena Gilbert's childhood friend and ex-boyfriend and is one of the only completely human characters in the TVD Universe.

==== In The Vampire Diaries ====
Vicki Donovan is Matt's older sister, who he takes care of as their troubled mother has left them. When Vicki dies, Matt is devastated. He is best friends with Tyler Lockwood. He is employed at the Mystic Grill as a busboy. Elena had broken up with Matt at the beginning of the series, though Matt has feelings for her and wants to get back together, since Elena and Matt were each other's "first". However, he later starts a relationship with Caroline Forbes.

When Caroline is turned into a vampire in season two, she tricks Matt into breaking up with her, for she can't control her bloodlust around him. However, they later get back together. When Matt learns that Caroline is a vampire, he suspects she had something to do with Vicki's death. He asks her to make him forget, but he secretly has vervain in his system and only pretends to forget; this was a plan of Sheriff Forbes. However, Matt finds out that Caroline is still the same person and tells her about the plan. He then breaks up with her due to the fact that he has too much to handle with work and school and doesn't want to deal with the fact that Caroline is a vampire.

In season three, Matt learns that Jeremy is able to see Vicki's ghost; after he drowns himself and is saved by Bonnie, he is able to see and speak to Vicki as well. She tells him that with his help, the original witch can make her (Vicki) come back whenever she wants without needing Matt to think about her. After he helps her, Matt finds out that the original witch wants Vicki to kill Elena in return; with the help of Bonnie, Matt makes Vicki return to the Other Side and shuts her out of his thoughts. Matt later becomes the first person to ever kill an Original Vampire when he kills Finn Mikaelson. However, this kills Finn's entire vampire bloodline as well, leading to the realization that if the Original that started the bloodline that Damon, Stefan and Caroline are a part of is killed, then they will die as well.

In season four, Matt blames himself for Elena's vampire transformation – Damon also blames him and wants Matt dead. Matt holds a grudge against Rebekah for trying to kill him and causing Elena's transition. Matt later moves into the Gilbert house when Elena moves out, due to Jeremy's urge to kill her. However, Elena moves back in, only for Jeremy to be killed soon after. Matt is shown to be devastated by the loss of his friend. He later develops a relationship with Rebekah Mikaelson and leaves Mystic Falls after graduation to travel with her.

They part on good terms as she goes to New Orleans in season five. Another woman the two had encountered (and slept with) in Europe, Nadia, later appeared in Mystic Falls where she followed Matt. It is revealed that she is Nadia Petrova, and is searching for her mother, Katherine. Matt was possessed by a Traveler for a brief time and was involved with Nadia. Nadia later compelled him to forget that Elena was possessed by Katherine. After Nadia's death, Matt helps his friends deal with the destruction of the Other Side with the help of Liv and Luke Parker.

In season six, Matt helps Jeremy cope with the apparent death of Bonnie and the two attempt to kill Enzo. After Elena falls into a magical, coma-like slumber, Matt takes on more responsibility and eventually becomes the sheriff of Mystic Falls. During this time, Matt ejects all vampires from Mystic Falls.

In season seven, Matt falls in love with his partner, Penny Ares. Matt believes that Stefan killed Penny, and he becomes hellbent on getting revenge on Stefan. However, after a series of events forces Matt to try and save Bonnie from being a bloodthirsty supernatural Huntress and he learns that Matt himself had killed Penny by accident, Matt is exhausted of the war between humans and vampires; he decides to leave Mystic Falls and start a normal life.

In season eight, Matt is reunited with his long-lost father, Peter Maxwell, who had abandoned him and Vicki when they were children. Peter reveals that Matt's ancestors were the founders of Mystic Falls before the 'founding' families took it over. They had built a bell in the Clock Tower, that upon being hit twelve times by a Maxwell descendant, would unleash the Hellfire and kill everyone around it. Stefan compels Matt to ring the bell, but Damon manages to stop him on the eleventh ring. This inadvertently allows several individuals to escape Hell, including Matt's own mother and sister (and also Cade, Katherine and Kai). His mother and sister later go to work for Katherine in order to stay out of Hell: Kelly injures Peter before dying again and Vicki plans on ringing the bell. Matt tells Peter about Vicki; they all go up the clock tower and Matt watches Peter and Vicki reuniting and hugging. Matt and Peter later watch the tower erupt in flames after the twelfth ring of the bell. Matt gets pulled into a vortex created by the eruption of the tower, damning him to eternal hell.

==== In The Originals ====
In season three, Matt encounters Elijah Mikaelson and a recently resurrected Finn who have returned to Mystic Falls in order to save their sister Freya from Lucien Castle. Although he is less than pleased to see them again, Matt agrees to help. During the standoff that follows, Lucien is killed by Matt and Finn firing Matt's gun loaded with wooden bullets through Freya's shoulder. However, this simply completes his transformation into an even stronger kind of vampire and Lucien knocks Matt out after his bullets have no more effect on him.

==== In Legacies ====
By the time of Legacies, Matt is no longer the sheriff of Mystic Falls, having successfully run for Mayor instead.

In season one, Matt enlists Alaric's help to investigate the murders of a number of bus passengers which were committed by a dragon. He later joins Alaric in confronting Kaleb Hawkins about his feeding on humans.

=== Vicki Donovan ===
- Played by Kayla Ewell
- Starring season: 1
- Recurring seasons: 2, 3, 5, 6 and 8

Vicki Donovan (loosely based on Vickie Bennett from the novels) was Matt Donovan's older sister. Vicki was a troubled drug-addict, taken care of by Matt as their mother had left them. In the beginning of the series, she was dating Tyler Lockwood. Vicki and Jeremy hooked-up a few times but Vicki didn't want people to find out, since Jeremy was younger than her. Later, acknowledging that she had feelings for Jeremy, Vicki breaks-up with Tyler and starts a relationship with Jeremy. She was later turned into a vampire by Damon. She was unable to control her bloodlust and when she attacked Jeremy, Stefan kills her. Stefan and Damon make it seem as if Vicki had left town. Her body is later found by Caroline Forbes, devastating Matt and Jeremy. Later, when Jeremy is brought back to life, he was able to see and communicate with Vicki, who asks for his help. Matt learns of this and engineers a near-death experience so he can also see Vicki. She tells him that with his help, the original witch can make sure she can come back whenever she wants. However, Matt later finds out that the original witch ordered Vicki to kill Elena in return; with the help of Bonnie, Matt makes Vicki return to the Other Side and shuts her out of his thoughts.

Vicki later returns in season five, to ask Jeremy and Bonnie to tell Matt to stop sleeping with Rebekah. She reappears on the Other Side when Liz Forbes kills Matt, and is later pulled away from the Other Side in a similar way to Katherine.

Vicki returns in season eight and appears in Damon's mind, when he has flashbacks of his attack upon her in the pilot episode. It is later revealed that Vicki managed to escape Hell alongside Katherine and her mother. Vicki went on a killing spree before going to the Mystic Falls Clock Tower to ring the bell and bring the hellfire to destroy Mystic Falls. Vicki is then reunited with her brother and father and completely breaks down. She had wanted to get out of the torturous Hell by ringing the bell for Katherine, but her family inspires her to become the person she always wanted to be. She goes through with their plan to save Mystic Falls and kill Katherine. Vicki then finds peace in the afterlife with Tyler, where they continue to watch over Matt.

=== Tyler Lockwood ===
- Played by Michael Trevino
- Starring seasons: 1–6
- Recurring seasons: 7–8
- The Originals special guest starring season: 1

==== In The Vampire Diaries ====
Tyler Lockwood (based on Tyler Smallwood from the novels) is the son of Mayor Richard Lockwood and Carol Lockwood. He plays for the Mystic Falls High School football team and is best friends with Matt Donovan. Tyler does not have a good relationship with his father, who sometimes acts violently towards him. However, when his father dies, Tyler is shown to be genuinely upset. In the beginning of the series Tyler is an arrogant bully. He is dating Vicki Donovan, who breaks-up with him for Jeremy Gilbert, causing them to become rivals. Tyler is shown to have a short temper and in season two Tyler learns from his uncle, Mason Lockwood, that he acts this way due to the werewolf gene.

After Tyler accidentally kills Sarah, a classmate who was compelled by Katherine to provoke him, his fears come true as he has triggered the werewolf curse. Caroline Forbes, a young vampire, helps him prepare for his new life, and Tyler eventually falls in love with Caroline. A werewolf named Jules comes to town and tells Tyler that Caroline, Stefan and Damon are responsible for his uncle's death, making Tyler feel betrayed. After Caroline is captured by a group of werewolves and Tyler hesitates to come to her rescue, Caroline breaks off their friendship. Hurt by Caroline's decision and wishing to protect his friends, Tyler later leaves town with Jules. However, he returns when his mother is in the hospital and makes amends with Caroline, deciding to stay in Mystic Falls.

Tyler and Caroline's friendship deepens and in the season three premiere, they end up sleeping together. After his mother learns that Caroline is a vampire and kidnaps her as she is trying to sneak out, Tyler reveals that he is a werewolf by transforming in front of her. After he helps Sheriff Forbes rescue Caroline from her father, they begin an official relationship. Tyler is later turned into a hybrid by Klaus. Due to his transformation to a hybrid, he is sired to Klaus, and would do anything to protect Klaus as his master. When Tyler tells Caroline that he is okay with this, she breaks up with him. Tyler eventually realizes that the sire bond isn't in his favor, and breaks it by repeatedly turning into a werewolf. He and Caroline get back together, but in the season three finale, Bonnie places Klaus' spirit in Tyler's body in order to save his bloodline (which includes Katherine, Stefan, Abby, Damon, Caroline and Tyler himself). It is unknown what happened to Tyler's spirit during this time, or if he agreed to the plan. Klaus later forces Bonnie to return him to his original body; once the transfer is complete, Tyler regains control of his body.

Tyler, along with a new friend, Hayley, begin to secretly unsire all of Klaus' hybrids. However, on learning about this, Klaus murders them all, along with Tyler's mother. As a result, Tyler is eventually forced to leave town, knowing that Klaus will seek revenge upon him. He returns briefly for prom. Klaus later grants Caroline a graduation present, allowing Tyler to return to Mystic Falls.

Later, Tyler became possessed by Julian, a Traveler. After the Travelers used the Body Sealing Spell on Tyler, Julian gained permanent control of Tyler's body and due to Markos destroying the Traveler's Knife that was needed to remove Passengers, Julian could not be banished. Later, Julian was captured by the Travelers and they brought Julian to Mystic Falls, where they had cast a spell that can undo magic, including vampirism. Thus, when Julian entered Mystic Falls, he lost Tyler's vampirism and they both died, because vampirism was what kept them alive. Tyler ended up on the Other Side, but thanks to Bonnie and Damon's sacrifices, he was able to come back to life and he discovered that he was no longer a hybrid.

In season six, Tyler struggles to stay human, and develops a relationship with the witch Liv Parker. At the end of the season, Liv's brother Kai attacks and critically injures them both, and Liv convinces Tyler to kill her in order to trigger his curse and thereby heal. Tyler reluctantly agrees, knowing that she was going to die anyway. He manages to injure Kai and save Alaric's life. Tyler leaves Mystic Falls after saying goodbye to Elena.

Tyler returns in season seven in order to take Elena's coffin to protect her from the Heretics. He returns again in season eight and is killed by Damon. Tyler is seen in the series finale as having been reunited with Vicki, where the two find peace together and continue to watch over Matt.

==== In The Originals ====
In season one, Tyler seeks out Klaus and attempts to kill him in revenge. However, he fails and he is imprisoned by Klaus in the Garden. Tyler remains imprisoned until Rebekah eventually releases him as a parting gift to Matt Donovon in 500 Years of Solitude in The Vampire Diaries.

In season four, Tyler is briefly mentioned when the Mikaelsons are seeking one of the Hollow's bones. It's revealed that it was under the protection of the Lockwood family of which Tyler was the last member before his death. However, Alaric Saltzman manages to find it for Klaus at the Lockwood estate.

=== Alaric Saltzman ===
- Played by Matt Davis
- Starring seasons: 1–3 and 6–8
- Recurring seasons: 4–5
- The Originals special guest starring seasons: 4–5
- Legacies starring seasons: 1–4

Alaric J. Saltzman, known as "Ric" (based on Alaric K. Saltzman from the novels), was the history teacher at Mystic Falls High School.

==== In The Vampire Diaries ====
Alaric originally comes to town to kill Damon, to avenge his wife. However, it was later revealed that his wife, Isobel Flemming, requested that Damon turn her into a vampire. Alaric then starts to become friends with Damon. Alaric owns a Gilbert Ring, which he obtained from Isobel, which prevents him from being killed by anything supernatural. However, John Gilbert later claims the ring. Alaric starts a relationship with Jenna Sommers. In the second season, John starts causing trouble between Jenna and Alaric, and Jenna leaves when she meets Isobel and knows Alaric has been keeping secrets from her. His body was later possessed by Klaus to gain the group's trust. Eventually Klaus releases Alaric, who gets back together with Jenna, but soon afterwards Klaus turns Jenna into a vampire and kills her for his sacrifice ritual, leaving Alaric heartbroken. In season three, Alaric moves in with Elena and Jeremy to take care of them, and represents the Gilbert family on the Founders' Council. He later starts dating council-member Meredith Fell, a local doctor.

It is later learned that Alaric was unknowingly killing people, due to the Gilbert ring giving him a vampire-hating alter ego, which was referred to as "The Darkness" or "Evil-aric". He was later turned into an Enhanced Original vampire by Esther in order to kill Klaus with an indestructible White Oak stake. In the season three finale, he dies when Elena drowns because their lives had been linked by Esther. His and Elena's deaths destroy the Darkness, restoring Alaric back to himself completely. He appears to Jeremy as a ghost to say goodbye, stating that he will always be there for them, and later at his grave where he listens to Damon lament about his responsibilities.

Late in season four, Alaric's ghost appears to Damon when Bonnie partially drops the Veil to the Other Side, granting Alaric temporary corporeal form along with the other dead of the Other Side. Retaining his vampire powers, Alaric works to protect the town and stop the chaos that the other spirits plan to unleash, stopping Connor Jordan and saving Damon from Galen Vaughn, protecting his friend until Klaus can arrive to cure Damon of his werewolf venom poisoning. He is later returned to the Other Side when Bonnie restores the Veil. Before they return to the Other Side, Lexi suggests to Alaric that once they've served their time on the Other Side for all of the terrible things that they've done, they could find peace in the better afterlife that Silas was seeking out by letting go and moving on. However, Alaric points out that that's virtually impossible for them given how much danger the people that they care about put themselves in.

In the show's 100th episode, Alaric's ghost briefly appears to check in on his friends, reassuring them that he is always watching over them. Alaric smiles as he watches Damon raise a toast to him, seemingly at peace.

In the season five finale, with the Other Side collapsing, the Mystic Falls gang decide to take the chance to resurrect their deceased friends, sacrificing dozens of Travelers at the Mystic Falls Grill and having Liv Parker perform a resurrection spell provided by Silas. On the Other Side, Alaric saves Elena from danger and helps Damon to rescue Sheriff Forbes from the rubble. As Liv performs the spell, Tyler Lockwood, Enzo St. John, Luke Parker, Stefan, Elena and Alaric all pass through Bonnie who is the Anchor to the Other Side and are resurrected, emerging from Bonnie as living, or undead, corporeal beings. However, Luke stops the spell after Alaric's resurrection due to the negative effect that it's having on his sister, trapping Damon and Bonnie on the Other Side as it collapses.

Alaric is a regular in season six, having trouble adjusting to life as a vampire. He gets a job at Whitmore College as the occult studies professor.

After Elena is unable to recover from Damon's death, she begs Alaric to compel her to forget that she ever loved Damon – which he can do as an Enhanced Original. Alaric starts forming a relationship with Jo, a doctor at the college, but decides it would be best if they weren't together and attempts to compel her into thinking she didn't enjoy their time together; this fails to work as Jo is a witch.

After Damon comes back to life, Alaric tries to convince Elena to allow him to undo the compulsion. Damon and Enzo are abducted by Tripp Cooke, who plans to kill them by driving them into Mystic Falls. Alaric and Stefan attempt to save them, but Alaric passes the border and begins to succumb to the wound that had caused his death. Jo arrives to help and, rather than drag him back across the border, treats his mortal wound with her skills as a doctor. As a result, all of the magic that had turned Alaric into an Enhanced Original vampire is drained away, turning him back into a human, which he survives due to Jo's medical care. This prevents him from reversing his compulsion on Elena. At the end of season six, Alaric and Jo are married and expecting a baby. Jo is killed at their wedding and in season seven he attempts to resurrect her.

In season seven, it is revealed that the Gemini Coven placed Alaric and Jo's twins inside Caroline Forbes for protection. Caroline gives birth to the twins, named Josie and Lizzie (after Jo and Liz Forbes). They eventually move to Texas and become a family. Caroline and Alaric do not remain together as she begins a relationship with Stefan. In season eight, Alaric and Caroline co-parent their children, who've begun using magic. Alaric later turns the armory into a school for children like his daughters, to teach them to control their powers. In the series finale, Alaric opens a school for gifted youngsters with Caroline in Stefan's name, where he and his daughters are watched over by Jo.

==== In The Originals ====
In season four, Klaus contacts Alaric for help with finding one of the Hollow's bones which was in the possession of the Lockwood family. Alaric finds the bone for him, but he refuses to get involved in any further fighting. However, Alaric is attacked by the Hollow herself possessing the vampire Sofya and he fails to protect the bone from her. Alaric is found by Elijah and Marcel Gerard and he provides them with information on another bone of the Hollow's that he had managed to locate for them. Alaric bonds with Klaus' daughter Hope and encourages her witchcraft, offering Hope a place in his school in the future. Alaric later greets Hayley when she brings Hope to be enrolled at the school.

In the last two episodes of the show, Klaus returns to Mystic Falls to seek out the help of Alaric and his daughters to defeat the Hollow once and for all. Klaus needs Lizzie and Josie to use their powers as Siphoner witches to drain the Hollow from Hope and then implant it into Klaus who will sacrifice himself to destroy it for good. Although the girls succeed, Elijah stops Klaus before he can kill himself.

==== In Legacies ====
In Legacies, Alaric is the headmaster of the Salvatore Boarding School for the Young and Gifted and he guides his students, including his daughters and Hope Mikaelson, in using their powers while fighting various forces of evil, including the Necromancer and Malivore. He also gets revenge for Jo's murder when Kai Parker escapes, giving Alaric the chance to decapitate him with Excalibur.

In season four, Alaric is severely injured and rendered comatose by Hope after she becomes the Tribrid, sending Alaric's soul to Limbo. There, he reunites with his former student Landon Kirby and the Necromancer and the three attempt to find a way out together. Alaric eventually uses a djinn's wish to restore the Necromancer's powers, turning the Necromancer evil again, but giving him the ability to return Alaric to his body. There, Alaric has to face Josie's departure, Lizzie's transformation into a vampire, a humanity-less Hope, and an invasion of gods. Alaric's injuries also leave him permanently crippled, forcing him to use a cane in order to get around with Alaric stating that he's lucky not to have been left paralyzed. However, as time goes on, Alaric becomes stronger, eventually losing the cane, although he is still permanently crippled. With the help of the Mikaelsons, Alaric restores Hope's humanity and includes his students in preparing for the battle to come with the gods. During the final battle, Alaric is forced to kill werewolf student Jed Tien in self-defense and takes a crossbow bolt to the shoulder to protect Ben. Alaric survives his wounds and is reunited with Jed, who was resurrected by Landon. Jed reassures Alaric that he had done the right thing and offers Alaric his forgiveness as they celebrate the destruction of Ken, the god who wanted to kill everyone.

In the series finale, Alaric decides to shut down the Salvatore School, convinced that it has brought more harm than good. However, after arguing with Hope and MG about it and receiving a gift from Josie, Alaric changes his mind. Instead, Alaric decides to leave to write the definitive history of the supernatural beings that he's known so that the world can know their stories, leaving Caroline in charge instead. Before leaving, Alaric says goodbye to Hope with the two acknowledging their father-daughter relationship.

=== Enzo St. John ===
- Played by Michael Malarkey
- Starring seasons: 6–8
- Recurring seasons: 5

Lorenzo "Enzo" St. John is a vampire formerly under the imprisonment of the Augustine society, where he was Damon's cellmate in the 1950s. He and Damon later revive their friendship while he searches for his lost lover, Maggie. Enzo shuts off his humanity after Damon reveals that he was the one who killed Maggie and then killed himself by having Stefan rip his heart out. He was resurrected in the season finale. Enzo was sired by Lily Salvatore, Damon's mother, having died of tuberculosis as a human.

Enzo is a series regular in season six, helping Caroline discover a way to resurrect Damon and Bonnie. After they visit Stefan and learn that he had been lying about searching for a solution, Enzo kills Stefan's human girlfriend, Ivy. In response to this, Stefan later finds Enzo, incapacitates him, and turns him over to Tripp Cooke, a vampire hunter with a familial link to Mystic Falls. It is later revealed that Enzo had made Ivy drink his blood, and she became a vampire. Enzo won't reveal the names of other vampires, so Tripp plans to drive him and Damon into Mystic Falls to kill them, reuniting the two friends (in chains once again), who are narrowly saved by Stefan and Alaric.

In season seven, out of love for Lily, Enzo allies himself with the Heretics. Eventually, he begins working for The Armory due to his interest in his past and later to learn his family's purposes. Enzo hides Bonnie from the Armory as they need her to open a mysterious vault. He gives her pills to mute her magic and the two fall in love. Enzo pursues Damon into a vault in the Armory when discolored and long-clawed hands grab his face and pull him backward.

In season eight, Enzo is killed by Stefan while he is under the influence of Cade. Bonnie's grief over his death creates a separate afterlife dimension where Enzo's spirit resides and communicates with her. However, Bonnie eventually lets Enzo go in order to allow Josie and Lizzie Saltzman to siphon from her and Enzo finds peace. Nevertheless, Enzo's spirit continues to look out for Bonnie, reassuring her during the spell to redirect Katherine Pierce's hellfire and silently watching over her as Bonnie leaves to travel the world. Then Enzo goes to hell, to other vampires killed earlier.

== Recurring characters ==
The following is a list of characters that are, or at one time were, a recurring guest on the series (but never starring). They are listed in the order that they first appeared on the show.

Actor	Character	Season								Count
Actor	Character	1	2	3	4	5	6	7	8	Count
Marguerite MacIntyre	Liz Forbes	Recurring	Recurring	Recurring	Recurring	Recurring	Recurring		Guest	50
Robert Pralgo	Richard Lockwood	Recurring								8
Susan Walters	Carol Lockwood	Recurring	Recurring	Recurring	Recurring					33
Jasmine Guy	Sheila Bennett	Recurring		Guest	Recurring	Guest			Guest	15
Bianca Lawson	Emily Bennett	Recurring	Guest			Guest				6
Arielle Kebbel	Lexi Branson	Guest	Guest	Guest	Recurring	Guest			Guest	9
Malese Jow	Anna	Recurring	Guest	Recurring						18
Kelly Hu	Pearl	Recurring		Guest						8
Mia Kirshner	Isobel Flemming	Recurring	Guest							6
David Anders	John Gilbert	Recurring	Recurring			Guest			Guest	14
Taylor Kinney	Mason Lockwood		Recurring	Guest						10
Lauren Cohan	Rose		Recurring	Guest						6
Anna Enger Ritch	Dana		Recurring	Guest						3
Daniel Gillies	Elijah Mikaelson		Recurring	Recurring	Recurring	Guest				24
Jack Coleman	Bill Forbes			Recurring						5
Claire Holt	Rebekah Mikaelson			Recurring	Recurring	Guest				37
Nathaniel Buzolic	Kol Mikaelson			Recurring	Recurring	Guest				10
Sebastian Roché	Mikael			Recurring						5
Persia White	Abby Bennett Wilson			Recurring	Guest				Guest	7
Torrey DeVitto	Meredith Fell			Recurring	Guest					12
Alice Evans	Esther			Recurring						6
Caspar Zafer	Finn Mikaelson			Recurring						4
Grace Phipps	April Young				Recurring					10
David Alpay	Atticus Shane				Recurring					11
Phoebe Tonkin	Hayley Marshall				Recurring					8
Olga Fonda	Nadia Petrova					Recurring				13
Rick Cosnett	Wes Maxfield					Recurring				12
Janina Gavankar	Qetsiyah / "Tessa"					Recurring				4
Penelope Mitchell	Liv Parker					Recurring	Recurring			20
Chris Brochu	Luke Parker					Recurring	Recurring			14
Raffi Barsoumian	Markos					Recurring				6
Tristin Mays	Sarah Nelson						Recurring		Guest	8
Chris Wood	Kai Parker						Recurring		Recurring	20
Jodi Lyn O'Keefe	Jo Laughlin						Recurring	Recurring	Guest	21
Annie Wersching	Lily Salvatore						Recurring	Recurring		17
Elizabeth Blackmore	Valerie Tulle							Recurring		20
Scarlett Byrne	Nora Hildegard							Recurring		17
Teressa Liane	Mary-Louise							Recurring		16
Jaiden Kaine	Beau							Recurring		12
Todd Lasance	Julian							Recurring		10
Tierney Mumford	Lizzie Saltzman							Recurring	Recurring	17
Lily Rose Mumford	Josie Saltzman							Recurring	Recurring	15
Leslie-Anne Huff	Rayna Cruz							Recurring		13
Ana Nogueira	Penny Ares							Recurring		5
Nathalie Kelley	Sybil								Recurring	12
Kristen Gutoskie	Seline								Recurring	9
Allison Scagliotti	Georgie Dowling								Recurring	5
Demetrius Bridges	Dorian Williams								Recurring	9
Wolé Parks	Cade								Recurring	8
Joel Gretsch	Peter Maxwell								Recurring	8
Sammi Hanratty	Violet Fell								Recurring	3

=== Liz Forbes ===
- Played by Marguerite MacIntyre
- Seasons: 1–6 and 8

Elizabeth "Liz" Forbes is the sheriff of Mystic Falls and the mother of Caroline Forbes. Her husband, Bill Forbes, who was a member of the town's council, had left her for a man after revealing that he was gay. She is first introduced at a Founders Day party at Mayor Lockwood's house. There, she is shown to have a strained relationship with her daughter. However, she does care a lot for her well-being, which is shown when she arrests a bartender after Caroline gets drunk. She is revealed to be a member of the Founders' Council, a secret organization dedicated to protecting Mystic Falls from vampires. Liz becomes friends with Damon after he saves her from Lexi Branson, and is seen letting him know about the council's plans. In the season one finale, she is handcuffed by John Gilbert for disagreeing with his plan to use the town as bait to capture the tomb vampires. She is later saved by Carol Lockwood, but they are unable to save Mayor Lockwood, who is burned with the vampires. Liz then finds out that her daughter has been in a car crash and goes to the hospital, where she is comforted by Damon.

In season two, Carol accuses Liz of getting Mayor Lockwood killed. Liz is later informed by Mason Lockwood that Damon and Stefan are vampires, though she is skeptical, particularly regarding Damon. She tests him by slipping vervain into his drink and he reacts negatively to it. When Damon and Stefan assume Mason did it and attempt to take care of him in the woods, Liz ambushes and shoots the brothers and has them injected with vervain. Liz tortures Damon in an attempt to learn how he and Stefan can walk in the sun, but is interrupted when Elena appears, followed by Caroline, who kills the deputies. Liz is locked in the cellar at the Salvatore House so that the vervain can get out of her system and she can be compelled to forget everything. Liz asks Damon to keep Caroline away from her, but after a talk Liz eventually accepts Caroline being a vampire; Caroline decides to compel her and Liz loses her memory of the whole ordeal.

After Matt discovers the truth about vampires from Caroline, he tells Liz, who comes up with a plan to make Matt pretend to be compelled to forget, while he actually has vervain in his system. Liz then uses Matt to spy on Caroline, who she believes is a monster. Liz tries to capture and kill Damon, but accidentally shoots Jeremy instead. Believing she has killed Jeremy, she is shocked to discover that Bonnie is able to resurrect him. She finds out that Matt came clean to Caroline. After confessing that neither wanted to secretly live in fear of one another, Liz accepts her daughter for what she is. After Caroline is locked in a cellar by her father for being a vampire, Liz and Tyler come to her rescue. Liz assists her daughter and her friends throughout the series as their relationship continues to improve and she becomes closer friends with Damon, before it is revealed that she's dying from cancer in season six. Liz is seen in the series finale watching over Caroline.

=== Richard Lockwood ===
- Played by Robert Pralgo
- Season: 1

Richard Lockwood was Tyler Lockwood's father, the mayor of Mystic Falls and the head of the Founders' Council. He had a bad relationship with his son and acts very authoritative towards him. It seems that he thinks of Tyler as a disappointment and when Tyler gets into a fist-fight with Matt Donovan at a party, Richard tells him to never embarrass his family again. When Tyler gets into a fight with Jeremy, he takes them outside and tells them to fight rather than talk to solve their problems. He had an unhappy marriage with Carol Lockwood and they constantly fight; he also flirts with Pearl. Although he seems kind and amicable to the outside world, he was actually quite selfish. In the season one finale, during Founders Day, he helps John Gilbert execute his plan to kill the tomb vampires. However, it backfires when he is affected by the device that neutralizes the vampires, due to carrying the werewolf gene. The deputies believe him to be a vampire and lock him in the basement, where he was killed by one of the tomb vampires.

=== Carol Lockwood ===
- Played by Susan Walters
- Seasons: 1–4

Carol Lockwood was the wife (and later widow) of Mayor Richard Lockwood and the mother of Tyler Lockwood. She was a member of The Founders' Council and knows of the existence of vampires, but not of the existence of werewolves. Throughout season one, Carol was locked in a hostile relationship with her best friend. She acts as a bad influence on her son Tyler, with much of his negative behavior emerging as a direct result of her snobbish behavior and emotional outbursts. In the season finale she shows, for the first time, that she cares for Richard. After releasing Liz, they vainly try to save Richard from the burning basement.

Carol was shaken and upset by her husband's death and blames it on the deputies. Carol finds Tyler in his father's study thrashing the room in an angry tantrum; this behavior frightens her and she was further shaken after Mason Lockwood calms Tyler. Carol later informs Damon that she was replacing Richard as the mayor until the next election and asks him to lead the council, which he accepts. After Tyler has turned into a werewolf and runs away, she finds a note from Tyler. It was later revealed that Elijah, one of the original vampires, convinced Carol to stop taking vervain in order to compel her. When Elena frees Elijah, he compels Carol to let him take refuge in the Lockwood Mansion. Later, Carol was compelled to make a phone call to Tyler, saying that she was in the hospital and wanted him to come and visit; Maddox then uses his powers to push her off the stairs, and she is hospitalized.

In season three, Carol learns that Caroline Forbes is a vampire; after Caroline sleeps with Tyler in the Lockwood Mansion, Carol shoots her with vervain darts. Carol then calls Caroline's father, Bill Forbes, and tells him about her. The next day, Carol slips vervain in Tyler's coffee to test if he is a vampire, and is relieved that he isn't. However, Tyler discovers this and confronts his mother, who says Caroline a monster. Tyler then shows Carol that he is a werewolf, and Carol promises that she will make sure Caroline isn't hurt. However, when she later calls Bill, she was unable to persuade him to free Caroline. When the doorway to the Other Side was opened, the ghosts of the tomb vampires decide to take revenge on the founding families and attack Carol. Caroline comes to Carol's rescue and holds them until the doorway is closed.

In the ninth episode of season four, Carol was killed by Klaus as payback for Tyler's plan to kill him.

=== Sheila Bennett ===
- Played by Jasmine Guy
- Seasons: 1, 3–5 and 8

Sheila Bennett was the grandmother of Bonnie Bennett and a very powerful witch. She died after overusing her magic to seal away the tomb vampires. She usually appears to Bonnie (as a spirit) to help guide her whenever she overuses magic or is having trouble with her powers. Sheila continues to appear throughout the series, ensuring Bonnie's (and indirectly Damon's) survival. She makes an appearance in the series finale to help Bonnie save Mystic Falls with the rest of the Bennet witches.

=== Emily Bennett ===
- Played by Bianca Lawson
- Seasons: 1, 2 and 5

Emily Bennett was the handmaiden of Katherine Pierce in 1864 and a powerful witch. She was a direct descendant of one of the women accused of witchcraft during the Salem Witch Trials of 1692. Emily was an ancestor of Bonnie Bennett through Sheila Bennett. She was the one who gave Katherine, Pearl, Anna, Harper, Damon and Stefan the jewelry which enabled them to walk in the sun. Although she helped these vampires, she secretly fought against them, for she enchanted Jonathan Gilbert's inventions, including a device which could hurt vampires. When the vampires were rounded-up by the Founding Families, she and Damon made a bargain: Damon would protect Emily's descendants and Emily would use her grimoire to protect Katherine by entombing her with 26 other vampires under the old Fell's Church. Emily was later burned at the stake by the Founding Families and her possessions, including her grimoire, were taken and buried in Giuseppe Salvatore's grave. Damon rescued Emily's children when the townspeople came for her.

In season one, Emily possesses Bonnie in order to stop Damon from freeing Katherine from the tomb. In season two, Bonnie takes on the power of a hundred dead witches, including Emily, by performing a spell on the place where the witches were burned. Bonnie and Stefan later go there again to ask the witches if they know a cure for a werewolf bite (inflicted on Damon). Emily possesses Bonnie and tells Stefan there isn't a cure, but when Bonnie is herself again, she tells Stefan that Emily mentioned Klaus, whose blood turns out to be the cure for a werewolf bite. When Jeremy dies, Bonnie was able to save him with help of Emily after she tells Emily that she loves him.

=== Lexi Branson ===
- Played by Arielle Kebbel
- Seasons: 1–5 and 8

Alexia "Lexi" Branson was a vampire and Stefan's best friend and companion. She had known Stefan and his brother Damon for over a century. Damon killed her to make the town council think that she was the vampire terrorizing Mystic Falls. Lexi returned as a ghost to help save Stefan. She later choked Damon for killing her but let him go. She and Stefan stayed together for the most part drinking and later parting on good terms. Through flashbacks when Damon was killing people in New York as "Son of Sam", Stefan sent Lexi to help Damon. For about 6 months they hung out while Lexi would ask Damon about Katherine, trying to help him remember love. One night Damon claimed that he didn't love Katherine and that he had fallen for Lexi, and they had a night of wild sex; the next morning he locked her on a rooftop with the sun coming up as punishment for her spying.

In season four, Lexi is one of the ghosts that invades Mystic Falls when the Veil is dropped. During this time, Lexi reconnects with Stefan and urges him to find a new life elsewhere. She also befriends the ghost of Alaric Saltzman, discussing the possibility of the afterlife known as Peace. She is returned to the Other Side when the Veil is raised once again by Bonnie.

In the season five finale, Lexi is one of the friends that the Mystic Falls gang decides to resurrect before the Other Side collapses completely. Lexi saves Stefan from getting sucked into oblivion as the Other Side collapses and briefly fights with Markos, the leader of the Travelers, ultimately kicking him into oblivion and keeping Markos from getting resurrected once again. However, before she can pass through Bonnie, Lexi realizes that the effort is killing her and she is unwilling to deprive Stefan of the chance to get his brother back, Damon having not yet returned. Instead, Lexi finds Peace, passing on to the better afterlife. Although heartbroken by the loss of both Lexi and Damon, Stefan recognizes that neither Lexi nor Markos returning is a coincidence and that his best friend has concluded her unfinished business and found Peace.

In the series finale, Lexi greets Stefan in the afterlife after he sacrifices himself to save Damon and Mystic Falls and destroy Katherine Pierce once and for all.

=== Anna ===
- Played by Malese Jow
- Seasons: 1–3

Annabelle "Anna" was a vampire who comes to Mystic Falls in order to free her mother from the tomb. She was in Mystic Falls in 1864 with her mother, Pearl, and wants to open the tomb to free her mother. Anna turned Noah and Ben McKittrick into vampires to make them help her save her mother, turned Logan Fell to get Honoria Fell's diaries, and befriended Jeremy Gilbert to obtain his ancestor's journal. Anna later kidnaps Elena and Bonnie in order to make Bonnie open the tomb, but they are saved by Stefan, who kills Ben in the process. After Bonnie opens the tomb for Damon to free Katherine, Anna succeeds in freeing her mother and bringing her back to life. Anna later reveals to Damon that she knew Katherine wasn't in the tomb, but needed him to believe it in order to free her mother.

Anna developed romantic feelings for Jeremy, who suspects that she was not human and tests it by forcing her to drink his blood. Anna confronts Jeremy over this, and refuses his requests to turn him into a vampire. She initially attempts to hide her involvement with Jeremy from Pearl, and Anna and Pearl eventually get into a fight. Anna agrees to turn Jeremy but learns his motive is to get over his first love, Vicki. After a short period of distance, they make up, both admitting to having used each other, but have fallen in love along the way. Anna enrolls in high school in order to spend time with Jeremy, and they begin a romantic relationship. Pearl is killed by Jeremy's uncle John Gilbert, devastating Anna, who is consoled by Jeremy.

On Founder's Day, Anna gives Jeremy a vial of her blood, telling him that if he drinks it he will die and become a vampire. She goes to the remaining tomb vampires, then reveals their plans to Damon – possibly to protect Jeremy. Damon warns her about the device; she is protecting Jeremy when John Gilbert sets it off, and was immediately incapacitated. A policeman finds her with Jeremy, injects her with vervain and takes her to the Gilbert building to be burned with other vampires, repeating the 1864 plan to eradicate their kind. When John Gilbert sees Anna lying in the building with the other vampires, he stakes her; her body is burned with the others. Damon sees this and later tells Jeremy how Anna died, regretting that he wasn't able to help. Jeremy questions whether it would be better to be a vampire and Damon admits it would be easier to turn the emotions off. Later, Jeremy drinks Anna's blood and takes all of Elena's sleeping pills.

In the season two finale, Anna and Vicki's spirits appear to Jeremy, after he was brought back to life by a spell of Bonnie's. In season three, Anna and Vicki appear more often to Jeremy, and Anna warns Jeremy not to trust Vicki, who asks Jeremy to help her come back to life. Later, Anna tells Jeremy that she was "on the other side". She tells Jeremy that she understands he had to move on with Bonnie. They later get in an argument when Anna warns Jeremy about the darkness, popping-up at an awkward time. Jeremy shuts Anna out, leaving her alone on the Other Side. When Jeremy tells Bonnie, she asks him to no longer talk to Anna and completely shut her out.

To make Anna reveal the location of Mikael, Katherine and Damon kidnap and begin hurting Jeremy. Anna and Jeremy seem to be talking again, working together to stop Vicki. Anna's re-appearances indicate that Jeremy is thinking about her, even when he's with Bonnie. When the doorway to the Other Side is opened, they are able to touch and secretly hang out. Elena sees them as they kiss, and Bonnie is influenced to close the doorway when she learns of this.

Elena continues to fight with Jeremy and Anna over their relationship. It is revealed that Anna stole a necklace which is the key to keeping the door open, in hopes of finding her mother. Crying, she tells Jeremy she didn't mean for anyone to get hurt and she just didn't want to be alone anymore. Jeremy consoles her, and she gives him the necklace, letting him know it is alright to let her go. Before the door is closed, Anna finds her mother and they make peace.

=== Isobel Flemming ===
- Played by: Mia Kirshner
- Seasons: 1–2

Isobel Flemming was Elena's birth mother and a descendant of Katherine Pierce. When Isobel was a teenager, she had a relationship with John Gilbert, by whom she later had a baby, Elena. When Isobel was pregnant, John brought her to his brother, Grayson Gilbert, who helped her through labor. After Elena's birth, a heartbroken Isobel gave her daughter to Grayson and his wife Miranda Gilbert. Isobel attended Duke University where she studied supernatural beings. Later in life, she met and married Alaric Saltzman. However, Isobel became obsessed with vampires and after being romantically involved with him, she asked Damon to turn her. She was assumed dead by the police and Alaric thought that she was killed by Damon after seeing them together.

In season one, Alaric comes to Mystic Falls to seek revenge on Damon, who admits that he killed Isobel, but that he also turned her into a vampire on her own request. Elena reaches out when she learns that Isobel is her biological mother, but Isobel avoids contact. Isobel later shows up at the Mystic Grill, greets Alaric, and threatens to kill everyone in town if she doesn't meet Elena. She is later visited by John in a loaned house, where she had two human minions, Cherie and Frank. It was revealed that Isobel, just like John, wants Jonathan's Gilbert's device – because Katherine, whom she seemingly befriended, wants all the tomb vampires dead. In season two, it was revealed that Isobel wants them dead in order to protect Elena from Klaus. She asks Elena to make Damon give her the device, threatening to hurt Matt and Jeremy. Elena convinces Damon to give her the device by saying that Bonnie can despell it. However, it is later revealed that Bonnie only pretended to despell it. Elena gives Isobel the device, saying that Damon gave it out of love for her. It was revealed that Isobel cares about Elena and they plot to use the device to kill all the tomb vampires and the Salvatore brothers in order to protect her. Before leaving town, Isobel compels Alaric to get over her and tells him that she realizes it was a mistake to become a vampire.

In season two, Isobel returns and introduces herself to Jenna Sommers as Elena's mother, but Elena refuses to invite her in and slams the door in her face. However, John invites her in the next day. Isobel asks Elena to join her at a place safe from Klaus, but Elena refuses. Isobel later tells Katherine that she made a deal with Klaus for Katherine's freedom, but she has to give Klaus the moonstone and the Petrova doppelgänger, Elena. Isobel tells Katherine to get the moonstone from the Salvatore brothers. It was revealed that she asked John to break up Jenna and Alaric because she was jealous. Isobel then kidnaps Alaric and takes Elena to a graveyard where her parents placed a tombstone for her. It is revealed that Klaus compelled Isobel to devise a plan to capture Katherine and retrieve the moonstone, which was why she returned. Isobel tells Elena that as a human she dreamt of meeting her daughter, but instead Elena has only met the part of her that would betray her own flesh and blood. She then receives a message from Maddox to set Elena free and kill herself by taking off her necklace, exposing herself to sunlight and being burned to death.

=== John Gilbert ===
- Played by David Anders
- Seasons: 1, 2, 5 and 8

Johnathan "John" Gilbert II was Grayson Gilbert's younger brother, Elena's biological father and Jeremy's uncle. In their youth, Grayson taught him about the vampires through the journals of their ancestor, Johnathan Gilbert. They inherited one ring each, which prevented them from being killed by supernatural forces. John had a crush on Isobel Flemming-Saltzman and sent her to Damon when she wanted to become a vampire. After her transformation, Isobel found John and they formed a partnership to obtain a mysterious invention created by Jonathan Gilbert.

John arrived in Mystic Falls for Founder's Day and was shown as a member of the Founders' Council. However, he knew Damon was a vampire, that there had been a tomb under the Fell's Church, and he knew about Katherine. He tried to intimidate Damon into helping him find the invention but Damon threatened to kill him and everyone in the council. Alaric and Damon discovered John was watching the vampires who had been in the tomb. John confronts Pearl about her possession of the invention but Pearl had already given it to Damon. When Isobel returns to town, John obtains the invention, and it is revealed Isobel and John were working for Katherine and planning to kill the tomb vampires. Unofficially, their goal was to kill the Salvatore brothers and save Elena from suffering in a life filled with vampires. John was additionally responsible for staking Pearl. John's fingers (including one wearing the wring) are cut off by Katherine who stabs him, posing as Elena to gain access to the Gilbert house in the season one finale.

In the season two premiere, John was rushed to hospital and was confronted by Stefan and Elena about Katherine's attack on him. Stefan then tells John that Elena does not want him there and Stefan threatens to turn John into a vampire if he does not leave. John packs his bags and gives his ring to Jeremy, though it was not made clear whether he had actually left Mystic Falls. John later returns to Mystic Falls and tells Jenna that he was Elena's biological father. It was revealed that he and Isobel were working together to free Katherine. Elena had trouble believing and trusting John, especially after he invites Isobel into their house; Elena rejects them and leaves. Isobel kills John at a party at the Lockwood Mansion, but he was seen wearing his ring and was brought back to life hours later. Upon learning that Isobel had committed suicide, John comes to the conclusion that he's no longer wanted anywhere in Mystic Falls and prepares to leave. Elena asks him to stay as he's the only parent she had left. Later, he goes through with a spell to save Elena from turning into a vampire, at the cost of his own life. He leaves Elena his ring and a letter saying he would have loved her as a human or vampire.

=== Rose ===
- Played by Lauren Cohan
- Seasons: 2-3

Rose is an old vampire who was born in 1450 and sired in 1472. In 1492, Rose's friend Trevor brings her Katherine Pierce who is seeking shelter from Klaus Mikaelson who is seeking to use Katherine in a ritual to break his hybrid curse. Under Rose's care, Katherine attempts suicide, forcing Rose to feed her vampire blood in order to heal Katherine and save her life. Having gotten what she truly wanted, Katherine proceeded to hang herself and transform into a vampire in order to remain out of Klaus' clutches for all time. As a result of their actions, Rose and Trevor are then hunted by Klaus for centuries.

In season two, after learning of the existence of Elena Gilbert, another Petrova doppelganger, Rose and Trevor travel to Mystic Falls, hoping to trade Elena for their freedom. The two manage to capture Elena and bring her to Elijah Mikaelson, but Elijah kills Trevor before pardoning Rose for her actions. Rose and Elena are rescued by Stefan and Damon who apparently kill Elijah, but Rose warns them that the rest of the Originals will be coming soon. Rose subsequently works with the Salvatore brothers to protect Elena from Klaus, learning in the process that Elijah, who had survived Damon's attack, actually has similar goals. However, Rose is bitten by the werewolf Jules with werewolf venom being inevitably fatal to vampires. With Rose's condition deteriorating and no cure to be found, she goes on a killing spree as her body attempts in vain to heal itself before being stopped. With Rose close to death, Damon uses his telepathic powers to give Rose an idyllic dream and then he stakes Rose in an act of mercy in order to keep her from suffering a much more painful death.

In season three, after learning that killing an Original kills their entire sireline, Damon and Elena seek out Rose's help in an effort to learn which Original they are descended from. Using Jeremy Gilbert's powers as a medium, the two are able to contact Rose on the Other Side who recognizes a potential romantic relationship between the two. However, Rose reveals that rather than being turned by an Original, she was turned by an ancient vampire named Mary Porter so Rose can't tell them which Original they need to avoid killing. Rose manages to locate Mary for Damon and Elena, but Kol Mikaelson gets there first and stakes Mary so that she can't tell them which Original had turned her. Rose later appears to Jeremy one last time, telling him that Damon and Elena are good together because they challenge each other and bring out the best in each other. As a result, Damon could be the best or worst thing in Elena's life. Rose then departs for the last time.

=== April Young ===
- Played by Grace Phipps
- Seasons: 4

April Young is a girl from Elena and Jeremy's past; Elena used to babysit her. She returns to Mystic Falls for her father's memorial service. She is openly nice and befriends almost everyone. April becomes Rebekah's first real friend. She was unaware of the existence of supernatural creatures in Mystic Falls and was visibly frightened by Connor Jordan, who attacked her twice during his vampire hunts. When Rebekah disappears, April finds her and frees her by removing the dagger. She learns about the existence of vampires in Mystic Falls from Rebekah and helps her gain information from Elena, Stefan, and Caroline about the cure for vampirism.

=== Liv Parker ===
- Played by Penelope Mitchell
- Seasons: 5–6

Olivia "Liv" Parker is a powerful and talented witch. She is in a coven – one which hates everything the Travelers stand for – that protects doppelgängers from the Travelers, especially Elena. She was a witch of the Gemini Coven and the twin sister of the late Luke Parker. Liv was the younger sister of Josette Parker, Malachai Parker, Joey Parker and three deceased unnamed siblings. She was the youngest daughter of Joshua Parker.

In season five, Liv was seen attending Whitmore College. She was introduced as an inexperienced witch and sought out Bonnie Bennett to help her. However, Liv and her brother were secretly sent by their coven to stop Markos and the Travelers. After Caroline Forbes snaps Luke's neck sending him to the Other Side, Liv was forced to perform a spell that allows the deceased to be resurrected. Luke was revived and, as Liv became weaker, he told her to stop the spell. The two then fled, leaving Damon and Bonnie trapped in the collapsing Other Side.

In season six, Liv continued attending college and had developed a romantic relationship with Tyler Lockwood. She carefully watched over Tyler, doing everything to make sure his werewolf gene didn't trigger. Liv and Luke are later reunited with their long-lost sister, Jo; they reveal that, as the twin children of the Gemini Coven's leader, they must merge their powers on their twenty-second birthday – the stronger of the two will become more powerful while the weaker will die. In the season six finale, Liv was killed by Tyler – at her request – so that he could trigger his werewolf gene in order to heal the wounds inflicted on him by Kai. At the time, Liv herself was mortally wounded and doomed to die along with her coven due to Kai's attack.

=== Luke Parker ===
- Played by Chris Brochu
- Seasons: 5–6

Lucas "Luke" Parker is a warlock and Liv's twin brother. He is protective of his sister and is in the same coven as her. He is openly gay. He is a younger brother of twins Josette and Malachai Parker, Joey Parker and three unnamed deceased siblings. He was the youngest son of Joshua Parker.

In season five, Luke was seen attending Whitmore College. He quickly found himself working with Elena and her friends in an effort to stop Markos and the Travelers. Luke's neck was snapped by Caroline Forbes in order to motivate Liv to cast a spell to resurrect him, Stefan and the rest of their deceased friends on the rapidly disintegrating Other Side. Liv eventually revived Luke, and when he saw how the spell was draining her of her life force, he used his magic to force her to stop the spell. The two then fled, leaving Damon and Bonnie trapped on the Other Side when it collapsed.

In season six, it was revealed that Luke felt bad for leaving Damon and Bonnie trapped on the Other Side, and started providing herbs to Elena so she could hallucinate conversations with Damon. Luke explained to the group about his family's dark past and how he would eventually have to merge with his twin, Liv. He completed the merge ceremony with Kai through a loophole because he didn't want to kill Liv, nor did he want Kai to do the same to Jo and take the leadership of their coven. He went into the ceremony believing that he could win, but he ended up losing the merge ceremony and his life essence was absorbed by Kai, along with his ability to possess magic (something Kai was not born with). An unintended side-effect of the merge was Kai absorbing Luke's personality traits, such as his compassion and empathy, which have tempered his own sociopathic personality.

=== Jo Laughlin ===
- Played by Jodi Lyn O'Keefe
- TVD recurring season 6
- TVD guest season 8
- Legacies guest season 1

Doctor Jo Laughlin is a non-practicing witch of the Gemini Coven as well as the twin sister of Malachi Parker and the older sister of Liv and Luke Parker, Joey Parker and three unnamed deceased siblings. She helped to lock Kai up in a prison world and gave up her own magic to avoid having to take part in the Merge.

==== In The Vampire Diaries ====
In season six, Jo, working as a doctor at a hospital, meets Alaric Saltzman months after his resurrection and the two begin developing a romantic relationship. Unaware that Jo is a witch and thus that she is immune to compulsion, Alaric tries to make her forget about him without success. When the anti-magic barrier around Mystic Falls starts draining the magic that had turned Alaric into an Enhanced Original Vampire, Jo comes to his rescue, using her skills as a doctor to treat the fatal wound that Esther Mikaelson had inflicted to kill Alaric and transform him into a vampire. Thanks to Jo's intervention, Alaric survives the magic being purged from his body and he becomes human again. The two continue their relationship, but Jo's life is made more complicated by the return of her twin brother Kai from the prison world and Jo getting pregnant with Alaric's twin daughters Josie and Lizzie. She also helps to treat Elizabeth Forbes' terminal cancer. Jo later reclaims her magic and allows Kai to absorb it and gets engaged to Alaric after discovering her pregnancy. However, at Alaric and Jo's wedding, she is murdered by Kai, apparently killing the babies as well. Her death is avenged a short time later when Kai is killed by Damon Salvatore.

In season seven, it's revealed that the Gemini Coven had transferred the babies into the womb of Caroline Forbes and as a result, they had survived Jo's death. Bonnie Bennett attempts to resurrect Jo using the Phoenix Stone, but she only succeeds in resurrecting one of the deceased vampires held within it instead who dies again shortly thereafter.

In season eight, Kai is resurrected from Hell and attempts to kill Jo's daughters before he is banished to a new prison world by Bonnie, Josie and Lizzie. In the series finale, it's revealed that Jo has found Peace and that she is watching over her family from the afterlife.

==== In Legacies ====
In season one, Jo is resurrected from Peace by the Necromancer and she reunites with Alaric who is alarmed by her return. Jo finally meets her daughters for the first time, but she is taken over by the Necromancer who uses Jo to get at Josie as leverage to force Alaric to give up the supernatural knife in his possession. Terrified of what she could do to her family, Jo requests that her daughters siphon off the Necromancer's magic even though she knows that it will likely kill her again. After a final conversation with their mother, Josie and Lizzie reluctantly comply with her wishes and siphon off the magic, causing Jo to fade away and return to Peace.

In season two, after Kai escapes from the prison world, Alaric takes his revenge upon him for Jo's murder, killing Kai with Excalibur. Before chopping off Kai's head, Alaric tells him that "this is for Jo."

=== Kai Parker ===
- Played by Chris Wood
- Seasons: 6 and 8
- Legacies season 2

Malachai "Kai" Parker was the main antagonist of season 6 who appeared again in season 8 as a secondary villain. He first appeared in episode 3 of season 6 Welcome to Paradise and appeared in 17 episodes of that season. He later reappeared in season 2 of Legacies.

==== In The Vampire Diaries ====
Kai was born in 1972 to the Gemini Coven, a powerful group of witches who reside in Portland Oregon. To become more powerful the Gemini Coven forces the eldest twins to merge on their 22nd birthday with the stronger of the two absorbing the weaker one. This allows the members of the Gemini coven to live longer and have a greater access to magic. Kai did not possess any magical abilities of his own instead having the abilities of a siphoner meaning he was only able to gain magic by stealing it from someone else. This talent caused his family to neglect him making him vengeful and vindictive. When his coven refused to allow him to merge with Josette he butchered his siblings and impaled Jo with a steak knife. His family used their powers to lock him in a prison world where he repeats the same day over and over again, never ageing and suffering for eternity.

At the beginning of season 6, Damon and Bonnie are transported into the 1994 prison world where Kai Parker has been kept for 20 years. They soon realize that Kai is in the prison world with them and begin to theorize ways to escape. Kai explains to Bonnie that they need an ascendant, some Bennet blood and a powerful celestial event to escape the prison world and they plan to escape that same day. Damon and Bonnie realize that Kai is evil and try to escape without him however he betrays them both. Damon escapes while Bonnie and Kai are trapped. Kai and Bonnie spend the following weeks together before Kai betrays her and escapes without her.

Back in the modern day, Kai hunts after his lost twin Josette who is now engaged to Alaric Saltzman. He plans to merge with her and become the leader of the Gemini Coven however his younger siblings Luke and Liv prove to be a barrier. Kai captures Elena and tortures her in the Mystic Falls high school, testing his new siphoned magic on her, causing her daylight ring to melt and carving his name into her face. Damon, Jeremy, Liv and Josette go to save Elena however Jo's new powers prove to be too weak and she collapses. Jeremy impales Kai with a crossbow and they put him to sleep. Unfortunately, Liz Forbes (Caroline Forbes' mother) is infected with cancer and the only way to save her is to siphon the cancer away. Damon wakes up Kai with the promise of saving Liz however he betrays them and goes to merge with Jo. Luke Parker chooses to merge with Kai instead of Jo because he would actually have a chance of winning. Instead, Luke is killed and Kai becomes the leader of the Gemini Coven.

Kai and Damon go to save Bonnie who remains trapped in the prison world and they eventually save her, bringing her back into the modern day. To repay Kai for trapping her in the Prison World Bonnie betrays Kai leaving him in a second prison world where he remains with the Heretics until the season finale. In the last episode of season 6, Kai returns from the prison world during Alaric and Josette's wedding ceremony. He murders Jo and her two twin babies at the altar and precedes to kill himself so that he can become a Heretic Vampire. As a vampire, he murders the rest of the Gemini Coven by killing himself, and puts Elena Gilbert in a coma. He fatally wounds Bonnie before telling Damon that the only way to revive Elena is to allow Bonnie to die. Damon decapitates Kai mid-sentence.

In season 8, Kai Parker returns for three episodes. Kai and Damon team up to kill the all-powerful ruler of Hell, Arcadius with Damon trying to find out ways to keep Kai in the world of the living. Despite Kai's numerous evil deeds, he remains friends with Damon. They realize that for Kai to survive he must kill evil people, something that Damon and Kai happily do. Kai betrays Damon and kidnaps Elena trading her for his freedom with Cade, the Devil. He then tries to kill Alaric's twin daughters with an axe. Bonnie and Alaric subdue him and place him in another Prison World where he reveals to Bonnie that Katherine is the new Queen of Hell. Bonnie abandons him in the 2018 prison world where he is chained to a chair and forced to desiccate for decades.

==== In Legacies ====
In season two of Legacies, it's discovered that Kai has escaped from his chains and that his prison world has been used by Alaric to imprison several rogue students for their lack of compassion towards humans. Kai manipulates the situation and he manages to escape from the prison world through Malivore. However, he is later captured and imprisoned by Hope before revealing that Alyssa is casting a spell to break the tie between Kai and the prison world, causing it to collapse. Kai is subsequently abandoned by the Necromancer for his betrayal and left to his fate. After returning from the prison world, Alaric decapitates Kai with Excalibur, killing him for good in revenge for Kai's murder of Jo.

=== Lily Salvatore ===
- Played by Annie Wersching
- Seasons: 6–7

Lillian "Lily" Salvatore is the mother of Stefan and Damon Salvatore and the widow of the late Giuseppe Salvatore. It has been suggested that she is kinder than her husband, Giuseppe, had been. When Lily is very sick with consumption, she is sent away by Giuseppe. An unknown nurse (who is assumed to be a vampire) feeds her vampire blood while she is in the tuberculosis ward in 1858. Lily dies of consumption, triggering her transformation into a vampire. Realizing this, Lily fakes her death and abandons her family, protecting them from the threat she poses. When she flees to Europe, she succumbs to her bloodlust and becomes a Ripper vampire, slaughtering victims for blood in the most gruesome ways. Lily moves from city to city, killing many people, until she is encountered by the Gemini Coven in Manhattan. As a punishment for killing so many people, they trap her in a prison world on October 31, 1903, where she is stuck for over a century.

Lily is eventually released from the prison world in season six and makes a deal with Kai Parker to release her "family", the Heretics, as well. In season seven, she is initially the leader of the Heretics alongside the resurrected Julian but finds herself torn between her sons and the Heretics. In an effort to kill Julian, Lily stakes herself after having linked herself to Julian. However, Julian has already broken the spell and survives and Lily dies shortly thereafter. Damon is shown to be haunted by her death in particular.

=== Valerie Tulle ===
- Played by Elizabeth Blackmore (season 7) and Katie Lumpkin (season 6)
- Seasons: 6–7

Valerie is a witch-vampire hybrid, and a member of the Heretics. She had a short romance with Stefan in 1863, when she was human. Valerie shelters in Stefan's house after being disowned and nearly killed by her own family. Valerie later helps Alaric find his unborn twin daughters, who had been spelled into Caroline's vampire womb. Valerie and Stefan discover a desiccated Caroline and realize the talisman didn't work. Valerie gathers the remaining Heretics and together they perform a spell to attract the babies into being born. As others are forced to leave, Valerie stays behind, and Bonnie arrives to tell her of Beau's death. Bonnie and Valerie then perform a spell and the babies are born.

Valerie speaks to Stefan of a magical safehouse for supernatural travelers in New Orleans, though then loses contact with him and informs Bonnie about it. She works with Matt – despite their antagonistic relationship – to help Stefan escape from Rayna Cruz. Valerie informs Damon of the Armory's dark intentions. While Valerie and Stefan spend three years running from Rayna, they search for a magical herb to cloak Stefan's Hunter scar from Rayna's tracking abilities, and later begin a romantic relationship. Damon gets Valerie to reveal that she knew all along about a cure for Stefan's Hunter scar, but didn't want to lose Stefan to Damon or Caroline. Valerie is subdued by Damon before she can transfer the scar onto Damon, which buys Rayna enough time to stab Stefan with her sword and trap him in the Phoenix Stone. Valerie flees on an airplane, distressed about Stefan's entrapment. After his resurrection, Valerie reunites with Stefan until his second death and entrapment. After the Phoenix Stone is destroyed, Stefan is resurrected in the body of a drunk driver named Marty while a vampire serial killer named Ambrose takes over Stefan's body. Once Damon and Alaric capture Ambrose, Valerie performs a spell to transfer Stefan's soul back into his own body. However, she realizes that he loves Caroline Forbes more than her and Valerie leaves to find a new life, wishing Stefan well with Caroline.

In season four of The Originals, Hayley makes a possible reference to Valerie, mentioning that she had found a siphoner to remove the hex from Rebekah Mikaelson. At this time, Valerie is the only known siphoner left aside from Josie and Lizzie Saltzman.

=== Sybil ===
- Played by Nathalie Kelley
- Seasons: 7–8

Sybil is a siren and the servant of Arcadius, more commonly known as the Devil. Originally, she was an innocent girl who was banished from her village because of her psychic abilities, and cast into the ocean only to wash up on a deserted island. There she met and connected with another young psychic named Seline. Tricked into partaking in cannibalism by Seline to avoid starvation, Sybil threw herself off a cliff once she learned the truth and was forcibly turned into a siren against her wishes by Arcadius and at Seline's behest. Granted immortality, beauty and youth in exchange for her service, Sybil must feast on the flesh of the wicked to keep herself beautiful and delivers to Arcadius the souls of the damned.

=== Seline ===
- Played by Kristen Gutoskie
- Seasons: 8

Seline is the other siren and servant of the Devil. Banished to an island to die because of her psychic abilities, Seline chose to become a cannibal to avoid starvation and deceived her "sister-by-choice" Sybil into becoming a cannibal as well. After Sybil tried to take her own life once she learned the truth, Arcadius appeared before them and offered aide in exchange for their servitude. Seline accepted on both their behalf and entered into a deal with Cade. So long as they continued to serve Arcadius, he would grant them both immortality, beauty and youth. They would feast on the flesh to keep them beautiful and he would collect the souls of the wicked in Hell.

== Minor characters ==
The following is a list of minor characters who have had a story arc on the series that lasted four episodes or more. They are listed in the order that they first appeared on the show.

=== Season one ===
- Zach Salvatore, portrayed by Chris William Martin, is Damon and Stefan's great-great-great-nephew, in the first five episodes of the series before being killed by Damon after Zach locked him in a cellar.
- Logan Fell, portrayed by Chris J. Johnson in season one, is a news reporter who has a former romantic relationship with Jenna as well as being a member of the Founder's Council. Logan uses his relationship with Jenna to steal the Gilbert compass from Jeremy, but he is later killed by Damon and fed on by Vicki, completing her transformation. However, Logan has been fed vampire blood by Anna in an attempt to use him to get his ancestor's journal and he becomes a vampire, Logan's hunger turning him into a serial killer. After revealing that he and Anna can help Damon get into the tomb and free Katherine Pierce, Logan is spared by Damon. However, he is staked shortly thereafter by Alaric Saltzman in order to protect Jenna from him.
- Harper, portrayed by Sterling Sulieman in season one, is a kind-hearted vampire that escapes from the tomb when it is opened, but he is killed by John Gilbert.
- Kelly Donovan, portrayed by Melinda Clarke in season one, is the mother of Matt and Vicki Donovan, who returns to Mystic Falls and learns her daughter has died. After a long absence from the series, Kelly makes a brief return in season eight. She claims to have died 2 years prior to her appearance and was sent to hell; when Matt rings the Maxwell bell earlier in season eight he opened a door to hell and Katherine helped her and Vicki (Kelly's daughter and Matt's sister) escape in exchange for later help in destroying Mystic Falls. She almost kills Matt's father.

=== Season two ===
- Luka Martin, portrayed by Bryton James in season two was originally intended to be played by Brittney Dennis, is a warlock who befriends Bonnie, but it is later found out that he and his father work for Elijah. He is burned to death by Damon's flamethrower when he tries to invisibly save Elijah.
- Jonas Martin, portrayed by Randy J. Goodwin in season two, is Luka's father. He is a warlock and is introduced as a friend of Elijah's who can help defeat Klaus in order to save his daughter. He is later killed by Stefan.
- Jules, portrayed by Michaela McManus in season two, is a werewolf who comes to town looking for answers regarding Mason's death. She helps Tyler deal with being a werewolf, but is later killed by Klaus during the sacrifice.
- Andie Star, portrayed by Dawn Olivieri in season two and the first episode of season three, is a love-interest for Damon. He first uses her for feeding and sex, but later grows fond of her. She is killed by Stefan when he wants to prove to Damon that he is not worth saving.
- Maddox, portrayed by Gino Anthony Pesi at the end of season two, is a warlock who works for Klaus. He is shot by Matt in the back and killed by Damon.
- Dana, portrayed by Anna Enger, is a student at Mystic Falls High School who was compelled by Klaus (in Alaric's body) at the decade dance to tell Elena to save the last dance for him. She makes her second and final appearance on the show in season three, when Elena and all her classmates are at prank night and Klaus compels Stefan to kill both Dana and a student named Chad.

=== Season four ===
- Connor Jordan, portrayed by Todd Williams in season four, is a vampire hunter and one of "The Five", a group of supernatural vampire hunters. He comes to Mystic Falls to kill all the vampires there, but is killed by Elena. Elena is haunted by hallucinations of Connor who try to drive her to suicide as part of the Hunter's Curse, a failsafe to ensure that whatever vampire kills a member of the Five dies with them. However, Elena is saved when her brother Jeremy kills one of Klaus' hybrids and takes Connor's place. He later returns as a ghost trying to cure and kill Silas, but is stopped by the ghost of Alaric. Connor nearly succeeds in killing Damon with werewolf-venom coated bullets even after being thwarted, but Klaus cures Damon.
- Rudy Hopkins, portrayed by Rick Worthy in season four, is Bonnie's father and the town's new mayor, replacing Carol Lockwood. He is killed by Silas in the season five premiere.
- Galen Vaughn, portrayed by Charlie Bewley in season four, is a vampire hunter and one of "The Five". He attacks the group on the island to stop the waking of Silas, but gets stuck in a well and starves to death. He later returns as a ghost trying to cure and kill Silas, but is stopped by the ghost of Alaric.
- Aja, portrayed by Cynthia Addai-Robinson, is a witch and a friend of Abby Bennett who is called upon by Abby to perform a magical cleansing on Bonnie Bennett in order to remove her powers from using Expression magic. During a struggle to prevent this, she is stabbed and killed by Caroline Forbes. However, as she is magically linked to the rest of her coven, they all die with her, completing the sacrifice of twelve witches and finishing Silas' Expression Triangle. She later returns as a ghost alongside her coven when Bonnie drops the Veil, seeking revenge upon Caroline and her friends. However, Klaus Mikaelson rescues them, decapitating Aja with a thrown graduation cap and threatening her coven into leaving peacefully.

=== Season five ===
- Jesse, portrayed by Kendrick Sampson in season five, is a student at Whitmore College who likes Caroline. Having been fed vampire blood by Caroline, he gets turned into a vampire who feeds on other vampires by Professor Maxfield but is killed by Elena when he attacks Damon.
- Aaron Whitmore, portrayed by Shaun Sipos in season five, is a student at Whitmore College. Professor Maxfield became his legal guardian after Damon had killed his family. He is killed by Damon after Katherine (in Elena's body) breaks up with him.
- Markos, portrayed by Raffi Barsoumian in season five, is the leader of the Travelers, who comes back from the dead. He wants to break the curse the witches put on the Travelers using Elena and Stefan's blood. Damon and Elena eventually kill him and all of the remaining Travelers. Markos attempts to hijack the group's resurrection spell, but he is kicked into oblivion by the ghost of Lexi Branson as the Other Side collapses around them.

=== Season six ===
- Tripp Cooke, portrayed by Colin Ferguson in season six, is a vampire hunter and descendant of the Fell family. He is secretly turned into a vampire by Enzo before he is traded back to his own people. As a result, when he crosses the anti-magic spell border, Tripp dies.
- Ivy, portrayed by Emily C. Chang in season six, is first introduced as Stefan's human girlfriend who is later turned into a vampire after a visit from Enzo and Caroline. She is killed by Tripp who drove her and other vampires across the Mystic Falls border via the Traveler's spell.
- Monique, portrayed by Gabrielle Walsh in season six, arrived in Mystic Falls "searching for a relative", and introduces herself as Sarah Salvatore. She is later killed by Enzo.
- Liam Davis, portrayed by Marco James Marquez, is a medical student at Whitmore College who Elena briefly dates.
- Malcolm, portrayed by Kent Wagner in season six and by Justice Leak in season seven, is described as being Lily's favorite Heretic. He is killed by Damon with Bonnie's help for menacing humans.
- Oscar Addams, portrayed by Wing Liu in season six and by Tim Kang in season seven, is a Heretic. Released from the 1903 Prison World by Kai, Oscar and five other Heretics are cloaked away (also by Kai). In season seven, Lily sends him on a mission to retrieve her one true love's body. Later, it is revealed he was sent by Lily to check on Damon during his time in the war. He is described as the fun or humorous Heretic.

=== Season seven ===
- Elizabeth "Lizzie" Saltzman, portrayed by Tierney Mumford, is a siphoner, the twin sister of Josie and the daughter of Alaric Saltzman and Josette Laughlin.
- Josette "Josie" Saltzman, portrayed by Lily Rose Mumford, is a siphoner, the twin sister of Lizzie and the daughter of Alaric Saltzman and Josette Laughlin.
- Ambrose, played by Paul Wesley, is a serial killer vampire trapped in the Phoenix Stone who possesses Stefan's body after its destruction and goes on a killing spree. After being captured by Damon and Alaric, his soul is transferred into the deteriorating body that Stefan is possessing while Stefan is returned to his own body. Ambrose then perishes once more with the body that he is transferred into which was deteriorating from containing Stefan's soul.
- Alexandria "Alex" St. John, portrayed by Mouzam Makkar, is a distant cousin of Enzo and the former leader of the Armory. She is looking for a Bennett witch (particularly Bonnie) to undo a spell that has her sister, Yvette, trapped in the Armory's vault.

=== Season eight ===
- George Dowling, portrayed by Allison Scagliotti, is one of Alaric's assistants after he takes over the Armory, who seems to be attracted to him. She is believed to be a Siren at one point, but has actually been compelled and framed by Seline, who kills and eats her.
- Dorian Williams, portrayed by Demetrius Bridges, is one of Alaric's assistants at the Armory. He is eventually clued in on the supernatural. His family were murdered by Stefan and he was compelled to forget, which he remembers when Stefan becomes human. He tries to kill Stefan but realises it isn't what he wants. He helps come up with the plan to destroy hell.
- Cade, played by Wolé Parks, is an ancient psychic who was burned at the stake. He crafted part of the afterlife into hell, where he tortures souls. He delights in corrupting innocent souls so they will be delivered to him. He first employs Sybil and Seline to find souls for him and then Damon and Stefan. When Matt nearly unleashes hellfire on Mystic Falls, Cade is able to enter Earth's dimension and kills Sybil and Seline. When Stefan becomes human, he declares their deal void and plans to kill him. After being trapped in limbo, he is killed by Stefan with a dagger made of Cade's own bones.
- Peter Maxwell, played by Joel Gretsch, is the father of Matt, who walked out on the family when Kelly became pregnant with him. He reconciles with Matt and learns of the supernatural, revealing their family were the original blacksmiths of Mystic Falls and constructed a bell that can summon hellfire. He is briefly reunited with Vicki when Katherine returns her to Earth.
- Violet Fell, played by Sammi Hanratty, is a teenager attending Mystic Falls high school. She is turned into a vampire by Stefan and, after losing control and killing three people, killed by him to deliver her to Cade.

== The Originals ==
In 2013, a spin-off television series, based around the Mikaelson clan of vampires (the original vampires), called The Originals was ordered to series by The CW. Many of the characters on The Originals initially appeared on The Vampire Diaries, including Klaus, Elijah, Rebekah, Finn, Freya, Henrik and Kol Mikaelson.

== See also ==
- List of The Vampire Diaries episodes
