= Chris J. Johnson =

American actor (born 1977)

- Born: Christopher Johnson; August 29, 1977 (age 48); Stoneham, Massachusetts, U.S.
- Occupation: Actor
- Years active: 2002–present
- Spouse: Ashley Wolfe
- Children: 2

Chris J Johnson (born August 29, 1977) is an American actor.

== Life and career ==
Born in Stoneham, Massachusetts, Johnson had a supporting role as a young agent in XXX: State of the Union. He also played the lead in Three Blind Mice and Daydream Believer. His other film credits include Straight-Jacket, Cursed and Fifty Pills (on which he was also executive producer). He then starred in Lifetime series "Against The Wall" as Danny Mitchell, an old friend of Abby Kowalski.

Johnson has made also guest appearances in several television series. Recently, he appeared in JAG. His other television credits include Desperate Housewives, NCIS, CSI, Miss Match and The Vampire Diaries. He also played one of the lead roles, Vince, in the UPN series South Beach. He also made an appearance in the 2011 video game L.A. Noire as Grosvenor McCaffrey, a main suspect in the case The Studio Secretary Murder.

Johnson starred in the Lifetime drama series Against the Wall in 2011. In 2013, Johnson was cast in ABC primetime soap opera Betrayal opposite Hannah Ware.

== Filmography ==
Year	Title	Role	Notes
2002	JAG	Seaman Todd Raff	Episode: "Hero Worship"
2002	CSI: Crime Scene Investigation	Chuck Darwell	Episode: "Let the Seller Beware"
2003	Miss Match	Daniel	Episode: "Matchmaker, Matchmaker"
2003	What I Like About You		Episode: "The Cheerleading Incident"
2004	Run of the House	Greg Sarko	Episode: "Forbidden Fruit"
2004	Straight-Jacket	Jeff	
2004	NCIS	P.O. James Morgan	Episode: "The Truth Is Out There"
2004	Three Blind Mice	Mason	Short film
2004	Desperate Housewives	Harlan Copp	Episode: "Running to Stand Still"
2005	Cursed	Police Officer	
2005	JAG	Marine Private First Class Hoke Smith	Episode: "Death at the Mosque"
2005	Daydream Believer	Eddie	Short film
2005	xXx: State of the Union	Young Agent	
2006	She Said/He Said		TV pilot
2006	South Beach	Vincent	Series regular, 8 episodes
2006	Fifty Pills	Paul	Also executive producer
2007	Without a Trace	Jimmy Fowler	Episode: "Crash and Burn"
2007	Shark	Brandon Cole	Episode: "Fall from Grace"
2008	The More Things Change	Rick Jordon	TV pilot
2009	Behind Enemy Lines: Colombia	PO3 Steve Gaines	
2009	The Vampire Diaries	Logan Fell	5 episodes
2010	Five Star Day	Aaron Greenfield	
2010	The Good Guys	Kyle	Episode: "The Whistleblower"
2010	1000 Ways to Die	Hank	Episode: "Dying to Tell the Story"
2011	Against the Wall	Danny Mitchell	Series regular, 13 episodes
2012	The Finder	Marty Nix	Episode: "Swing and a Miss"
2013	Body of Proof	Alex Jacks	Episode: "Dark City"
2013	Under the Dome	Thug	Episodes: "Exigent Circumstances" and "Curtains"
2013–14	Betrayal	Drew Stafford	Series regular, 13 episodes
2014	Chicago Fire	Harrison	2 episodes
2017	47 Meters Down	Javier	Film
2018–present	The Orville	Cassius	Recurring role
2019	100 Days to Live	Greg Neese	Film
2022	911	Trey Walsh	Series 6: 3 episodes
