= Miss Mystic Falls =

- The Vampire Diaries episode
- Episode no.: Season 1 Episode 19
- Directed by: Marcos Siega
- Written by: Bryan Oh; Caroline Dries
- Cinematography by: Paul M. Sommers
- Editing by: Joshua Butler
- Production code: 2J5018
- Original air date: April 22, 2010

Guest appearances
- Malese Jow as Anna; Kelly Hu as Pearl; Spencer Locke as Amber Bradley; Marguerite MacIntyre as Liz Forbes; David Anders as John Gilbert

Episode chronology
← Previous "Under Control"	Next → "Blood Brothers"
- The Vampire Diaries season 1

"Miss Mystic Falls" is the nineteenth episode of the first season of the American supernatural teen drama television series The Vampire Diaries. It aired on The CW on April 22, 2010. The episode was written by co-producer Bryan Oh and producer Caroline Dries, and directed by co-executive producer Marcos Siega.

== Plot ==
Stefan (Paul Wesley) continues drinking human blood, but he lies and tells everyone that he stopped. He tells Elena (Nina Dobrev) that the worst of his cravings are over, but when he goes to get his bag from his trunk, it is full of empty blood bags.

Sheriff Forbes (Marguerite MacIntyre) reports another theft of blood bags to John (David Anders) and Damon, (Ian Somerhalder) and John proposes that he and Damon team up to investigate. Damon agrees since he does not want John to reveal to everyone about his true nature.

Bonnie (Kat Graham) is back at school after her Gram's death, but she is acting weird. Elena catches up with her outside of class but Bonnie keeps her distance from her while she is more friendly to Caroline (Candice Accola) when she comes to ask her help to choose a dress for the Founder's Ball where she will compete for being Miss Mystic Falls for the year. Elena is also going to participate and she asks Stefan to be her escort who agrees to do it.

Anna (Malese Jow) appears in Damon's doorstep to apologize on behalf of her mother Pearl (Kelly Hu) for what the other vampires did to Stefan. She informs him that after the incident, Pearl asked them to leave and now it is only the two of them and Harper (Sterling Sulieman). Damon believes that Pearl and the other vampires are responsible for the robberies at the hospitals, but Anna tells him that they are not responsible for this. Anna leaves and Damon looks suspicious.

Stefan comes home from school and Damon starts asking him about the human blood. Stefan insists that he is "clean", but Damon does not seem to believe him. Stefan leaves the room and heads to the basement get another blood bag but Damon follows him and catches him grabbing a bag out of a stash of human blood. Stefan says he has it under control, but Damon worries and tells him that stealing so many hospital blood bags draws attention their way plus after so many years of not drinking human blood it will not be easy to control it. Stefan, still in denial, tells him that he is fine.

John uses his excuse of "working with Damon" and shows up at the Salvatore house. He asks Damon to help him find one of Jonathan Gilbert's inventions that was lost in the church fire on 1864. John suspects that Pearl has it since she was the one who Jonathan was flirting with. Damon, who realizes that John has no idea where Katherine is so he will not be able to help him, pulls out of the deal and threatens John that he will kill him and the whole council if he reveals that he is a vampire.

Elena and Stefan attend the rehearsal for the Founder's Ball's dance along with the other contestants. Bonnie and Caroline are also there and Elena asks Bonnie to talk since she sees that Bonnie is avoiding her. Bonnie explains that she feels like her grandmother died for nothing since the spell for sealing the tomb did not work and the vampires escaped. She blames Stefan and Damon for everything but she does not want to make Elena choose between her and the brothers. Stefan overhears the whole conversation.

At the Founder's Ball Anna runs into Damon who takes the opportunity to tell her about John and that he wants something that Pearl must have. Meanwhile, Jeremy (Steven R. McQueen) talks with John and tells him that he read Jonathan's journal, something that surprises John but he tells Jeremy that Jonathan was mad. Jeremy sees Anna across the room and excuses himself to go and talk to her. Anna is still mad at him because he wanted her to turn him only to be with Vicky and Jeremy says that she approached him only to save her mother. Anna wonders how he knows and he tells her that he read Elena's journal.

Upstairs, Jenna (Sara Canning) helps Elena to get ready for the Ball while they talk about Elena's mother. Elena goes to change and Damon shows up telling her about Stefan still drinking human blood. Elena looks shocked hearing it when Stefan gets into the room. Damon leaves and Stefan keeps denying that the blood drinking changed him. Mrs. Lockwood (Susan Walters) interrupts their fight and tells Stefan he has to wait for Elena downstairs.

Stefan leaves the room and heads to the bathroom clearly mad that Elena knows. Amber (Spencer Locke), one of the other contestants, gets into the bathroom and sees him.

In the meantime, the girls make their entrance one by one, Mrs. Lockwood notices that Amber is missing and Elena also can't find Stefan while she is coming down the stairs. Damon immediately steps in and escorts Elena to the dance floor and dances with her. They whisper to each other about where Stefan might be and Damon says that they should end with the dance first and then they will look for him.

Stefan, who kidnapped Amber, drags her along the street to his car. Stefan is torn about what he wants to do with her; he wants to feed on her but at the same time he does not want to do it because that is not him and if he does it then there will not be turning back. In the meantime, he has compelled Amber so she won't be afraid of him and when he tells her that he wants to drink her blood, Amber urges him to do it. Stefan bites her not able to resist anymore to his hunger.

Back at the Founder's Ball, Mayor Lockwood (Robert Pralgo) announces the winner of the Miss Mystic Falls who is Caroline. After the announcement Damon, Elena and Bonnie leave to search for Stefan while John finds out that the mother's name of the girl who was with Jeremy is Pearl. That is all he needs to know to understand that she is a vampire from the tomb.

Meanwhile, Stefan has stopped drinking from Amber who, due to his compulsion, tells him that it does not hurt if he wants to drink more. Stefan, then, reverses his compulsion making her afraid of him and asking her to run. Amber runs away but Stefan appears in front of her saying that he changed his mind and bites her again. Amber starts screaming when Damon arrives with Elena and Bonnie, and Stefan releases her. Damon tries to stop him but Stefan throws him away and then Bonnie uses her powers giving Stefan a headache, snapping him out of his bloody rage and he collapses. When Bonnie stops, Stefan gets up and runs away.

Sheriff Forbes arrives to the scene and Elena, Bonnie and Damon hide what really happened. Elena tries to talk to Bonnie but Bonnie makes her decision and tells her that she wants to stay away from her as long as she is not stepping away from the Salvatores. Damon returns home and finds Anna and Pearl waiting for him. Pearls gives him the device she took from Jonathan Gilbert but she does not know what it does. She thought she had gotten the watch that traces vampires but she realized her mistake the night she was caught.

The episode ends with Elena going to Stefan's bedroom. Stefan tells her that she should not be there and that earlier she saw who he really is; a monster. Elena keeps telling him that he is not that person and they fight. In a moment of no control, he pushes her against the wall and Elena looks scared. Stefan apologizes, they embrace and he starts crying. Elena promises him that she will help him and everything will be fine while she injects him with vervain. Stefan collapses and Elena, along with Damon, lock Stefan in the basement to detox. They both sit outside of the cell.

== Feature music ==
In "Miss Mystic Falls" we can hear the songs:

- "All I Need" by Within Temptation
- "Never Coming Down" by Faber Drive
- "The Blue Danube" by Johann Strauss
- "Yellow" by Vitamin String Quartet
- "Clocks" by Vitamin String Quartet
- "Menuet Celebre" by Luigi Boccherini

== Reception ==
=== Ratings ===
In its original American broadcast, "Miss Mystic Falls" was watched by 3.33 million; down by 0.18 from the previous episode.

=== Reviews ===
"Miss Mystic Falls" received positive reviews.

Matt Richenthal of TV Fanatic rated the episode with 4.6/5 saying: "The first half of this week's episode started slowly, as Stefan was hooked on human blood, but denying it to Damon and Elena. But "Miss Mystic Falls" soon picked up the pace and Paul Wesley sent Ian Somerhalder a message: two can play scary!" Richenthal also praised Wesley's acting stating: "Wesley played this role perfectly, especially when it came to depicting Stefan's internal struggle. Damon may have learned to control his feeding habits and actually embraces his dark side... but Stefan still wants to fight it, scaring himself as much as anyone else when the urge kicks in."

Robin Franson Pruter rated the episode with 4/4. "Quality execution lifts up an inauspicious premise, making this episode a winner, with good direction providing the crowning touch. The premise of the episode—Elena and Caroline competing with a few other girls in a local pageant—doesn’t seem that promising. However, the execution of the episode along with the development of the serialized stories—Stefan’s spiral toward rock bottom, Damon’s growing attraction to Elena—make it top-notch."

Josie Kafka from Doux Reviews rated the episode with 3.5/4. He commented on Damon and Elena's relationship saying: "Damon dancing with Elena wasn’t just about him covering for Stefan, it was also him wanting to be Elena’s friend. Their relationship is one that doesn’t have reference to the past—it’s not about what’s expected, or fulfilling old patterns, or replaying the same stories. It’s something else, but neither Damon nor Elena knows exactly what yet."

Popsugar of Buzzsugar gave a good review to the episode saying that it was another solid episode. "This week's episode of The Vampire Diaries is all about pageantry and addiction — and it's juicy in more ways than one. We already had a sneak peek at the Miss Mystic Falls event, but seeing Damon and Elena actively dancing together with my own eyes was so much better!"
