= A Few Good Men (The Vampire Diaries) =

- The Vampire Diaries episode
- Episode no.: Season 1 Episode 15
- Directed by: Joshua Butler
- Written by: Brian Young
- Cinematography by: Paul M. Sommers
- Editing by: Lance Anderson
- Production code: 2J5014
- Original air date: March 25, 2010

Guest appearances
- Mia Kirshner as Isobel Flemming; Marguerite MacIntyre as Liz Forbes; Malese Jow as Anna; Kelly Hu as Pearl; Sterling Sulieman as Harper; Amanda Detmer as Trudie Peterson; Melinda Clarke as Kelly Donovan

Episode chronology
← Previous "Fool Me Once"	Next → "There Goes the Neighborhood"
- The Vampire Diaries season 1

"A Few Good Men" is the fifteenth episode of the first season of the American supernatural teen drama television series The Vampire Diaries. It aired on The CW on March 25, 2010. The episode was written by staff writer Brian Young and directed by Joshua Butler.

== Plot ==
The episode starts with Harper (Sterling Sulieman), the vampire who got out of the tomb attacking a hiker and then stealing his clothes. He gets out of the woods and gets to the town looking lost in the modern world. He sees a woman sitting on a bench who nods to him and he nods back.

Jenna (Sara Canning) found information about Elena's (Nina Dobrev) birth mother and she informs her. There is a friend of her mother who lives nearby, Trudie Peterson (Amanda Detmer). Jenna also tells Elena that Alaric's (Matt Davis) wife's name was also Isobel and she is dead but she does not know if it is the same person. Elena tells Stefan (Paul Wesley) about Trudie and Alaric's wife and he asks her if she will go to visit Trudie to let him go with her. Meanwhile, Jenna meets Alaric at school and tells him about Elena's birth mother. He says that his wife didn't have any kids but when Jeanna shows him a picture of Elena's mother he leaves in shock.

Damon (Ian Somerhalder) tries to deal with the truth about Katherine on his own way; partying with girls. Stefan interrupts them because he wants to ask him about Isobel (Mia Kirshner) but Damon says he does not know her and goes back to partying. Meanwhile, Caroline (Candice Accola) is with Matt (Zach Roerig) at his place and while they are making out, his mother Kelly (Melinda Clarke) gets in. Caroline leaves and Matt catches up with his mother.

Elena goes at Trudie's house to ask about Isobel and Trudie, who realizes that she is Isobel's daughter, lets her in. Trudie texts someone: "She is here" and while they are talking, she makes some tea to drink. Elena figures out that she put vervain in it and realizes that Trudie knows about vampires but when she asks her, Trudie asks her to leave. As Elena makes her way to her car, she sees a man standing in the road looking at her. She takes off before the man approaches and later she tells Stefan all about it. Stefan tells her that Alaric thinks his wife was probably killed by a vampire but does not mention that it was Damon and asks her to wait a little before talk to him.

In the meantime, Alaric meets Stefan to talk to him about his wife and if he found out anything since he promised to help him. He wants to know what Damon did to Isobel but Stefan tells him that Damon says he does not remember her and he asks for a picture of hers to show it to him. Stefan shows the picture to Damon but he still says that he does not know her. In a flashback, we see that Isobel was investigating vampires and she was obsessed with finding the truth.

Damon goes to the Grill's bar for a drink and Alaric is there. They talk for a while before Alaric leaves and Liz (Marguerite MacIntyre) appears. She wants to ask Damon to be one of the bachelors at the Founder's fundraiser and he accepts. In return, he asks her help on finding information about Alaric because he does not trust him. Meanwhile, the mystery man Elena saw outside Trudie's house now knocks Trudie's door asking about Elena. Even though Trudie tells him what he wants, the man kills her.

At the Founder's fundraiser, Liz gives Damon the info he wanted about Alaric and he realizes that Alaric's wife is the woman Stefan was asking him about. The Bachelor Raffle begins and Mrs Lockwood (Susan Walters) introduces the bachelors. When she goes to Damon, he starts talking about Alaric's wife and that once they drank together and that she was delicious. Alaric tries to stay calm and Elena is horrified while she realizes that Damon was the vampire who killed her mother.

Elena runs outside and Stefan follows her telling her that they do not know for sure if Damon killed Isobel because her body never found. While they talk, the mystery man who killed Trudie, shows up and tells Elena to stop looking for her because she does not want to know her. Elena tries to ask him about Isobel but Stefan figures out that the man in under compulsion and she just tells him that she will stop. As soon as she tells him that, he steps in the middle of the road and a truck hits him. Elena takes his cell phone from the ground and she and Stefan go back inside. There she runs into Damon who can't understand why Elena is so mad at him, until she tells him who Isobel was.

Alaric, leaves the fundraiser and goes to the Salvatore house to find Damon holding a stake and ask him about Isobel. Damon tells him that he did not kill her but turned her since Isobel came to him begging him to do it. Alaric attacks him trying to stake him but Damon gets the stake and kills Alaric. Stefan arrives and sees Alaric dead lying on the floor. Damon tells him that Alaric attacked him and now that he knows Isobel was related with Elena believes that somehow Katherine sent her to him for a reason and he leaves.

Stefan stays with Alaric's body when suddenly Alaric comes back to life. They are both shocked and Stefan believes that someone must have given him vampire blood and they turned him. Alaric remembers a conversation he had with Isobel when she gave him his ring and told him that it was a gift to protect him and he tells Stefan that it was the ring that somehow protected him.

Elena is back at home and dials the last number the mystery man called from his cell. A woman's voice answers asking if there was a problem and if he found her. Elena realizes that is Isobel but the moment Isobel hears that is Elena, she hangs up the phone.

The episode ends with Harper arriving at a house at the woods. He knocks and the woman he saw sitting on the bench opens the door and then calls for Pearl. Pearl comes and greets Harper with her daughter, Anna. Along with them comes a woman who Pearl asks her to invite Harper in.

== Feature music ==
In "A Few Good Men" we can hear the songs:

- "Black Hearts (On Fire)" by Jet
- "Portrait of a Summer Thief" by Sounds Under Radio
- "Something in Common" by Free Energy
- "Winter Night" by Sweet Thing
- "Real You" by Above the Golden State
- "Your Eyes Are Liars" by Sound Team
- "Time Is A Runaway" by The Alternate Routes

== Reception ==
=== Ratings ===
In its original American broadcast, "A Few Good Men" was watched by 3.33 million; down by 0.18 from the previous episode.

=== Reviews ===
"A Few Good Men" received positive reviews.

Steve Marsi of TV Fanatic rated the episode with 4.3/5. "Last night's return of The Vampire Diaries was so anticipated by us, it couldn't possibly live up to expectations ... right? It came pretty darn close, reminding us again why it's moved beyond CW guilty pleasure status and become one of the best shows on TV."

Josie Kafka from Doux Reviews rated the episode with 4/4. "So much happened, so much information was exchanged, so many lines drawn and re-drawn. Such great performances from Ian Somerhalder and Matt Davis."

Mark Estes from TV Overmind gave a good review to the episode saying that the show "rocks" and how surprise he was with Alaric's "death" and how it turned out. "After seeing Matt Davis upped to series regular status in the credits, imagine my face when I saw him 'die'. I know this happened on previous shows, namely Buffy, but to see the practice again was a shocker. And then as if they really wanted to give me a heart attack last night, Alaric gets up?!!?!"

Popsugar of Buzzsugar gave a good review to the episode saying that it was a satisfying, thrilling one while Zeba of Two Cents TV said it was awesome.

Despite the positive reviews, Robin Franson Pruter from Forced Viewing rated the episode with 2/4 saying that it was a disappointing episode that focused on back-story. "It [A Few Good Men] only touched on the escape of the other vampires from the tomb that happened at the end of "Fool Me Once." Instead, it focused on Alaric’s supposedly dead wife, Isobel, making this episode seem like a digression between the previous episode, in which the tomb was opened, and the following episode, which dealt with the consequences of opening the tomb."
