= The Vampire Diaries season 1 =

Season of television series

The Vampire Diaries
- Season 1
- Season 1 DVD cover
- Showrunners: Kevin Williamson; Julie Plec
- Starring: Nina Dobrev; Paul Wesley; Ian Somerhalder; Steven R. McQueen; Sara Canning; Katerina Graham; Candice Accola; Zach Roerig; Kayla Ewell; Michael Trevino; Matt Davis
- No. of episodes: 22

Release
- Original network: The CW
- Original release: September 10, 2009 – May 13, 2010

Season chronology
- Next → Season 2

The Vampire Diaries is an American supernatural horror romance television series created by Kevin Williamson based on the novels of the same name by author L. J. Smith. It was officially picked up for the 2009–10 season on May 19, 2009. It premiered on September 10, 2009, on The CW and received the highest ratings for a series premiere in the network's history at that point, scoring 4.91 million live viewers.

The series focuses on the fictional town of Mystic Falls, Virginia, that is charged with supernatural history. It follows Elena Gilbert portrayed by Nina Dobrev as she begins to get over her parents' death, when two vampires pull her into a world she didn't know before, Stefan and Damon Salvatore, portrayed by Paul Wesley and Ian Somerhalder, respectively. Kayla Ewell portrayed Vicki Donovan for the first seven episodes until her character was killed off. Matt Davis was later cast as a history teacher in a recurring role to fill the void. He was later upgraded to series regular status. The season concluded on May 13, 2010, and consisted of 22 episodes.

== Cast ==
=== Starring ===
- Nina Dobrev as Elena Gilbert / Katherine Pierce
- Paul Wesley as Stefan Salvatore
- Ian Somerhalder as Damon Salvatore
- Steven R. McQueen as Jeremy Gilbert
- Sara Canning as Jenna Sommers
- Kat Graham as Bonnie Bennett
- Candice Accola as Caroline Forbes
- Zach Roerig as Matt Donovan
- Kayla Ewell as Vicki Donovan
- Michael Trevino as Tyler Lockwood
- Matt Davis as Alaric Saltzman

=== Recurring ===
- Malese Jow as Anna
- Marguerite MacIntyre as Liz Forbes
- Robert Pralgo as Richard Lockwood
- Kelly Hu as Pearl
- Susan Walters as Carol Lockwood
- Chris Johnson as Logan Fell
- Jasmine Guy as Sheila Bennett
- David Anders as John Gilbert
- Sterling Sulieman as Harper
- Chris William Martin as Zach Salvatore
- Bianca Lawson as Emily Bennett
- Melinda Clarke as Kelly Donovan
- Mia Kirshner as Isobel Flemming

=== Guest ===
- Benjamin Ayres as William Tanner
- Sean Faris as Ben McKittrick
- Stephen Martines as Frederick
- James Remar as Giuseppe Salvatore
- Arielle Kebbel as Lexi Branson
- Gina Torres as Bree
- Brandon Quinn as Lee
- Dillon Casey as Noah
- Amanda Detmer as Trudie Peterson
- Spencer Locke as Amber Bradley
- Mike Erwin as Charlie
- Cindy Busby as Brooke Fenton

== Episodes ==
No. overall	No. in season	Title	Directed by	Written by	Original release date	Prod. code	U.S. viewers (millions)
1	1	"Pilot"	Marcos Siega	Teleplay by : Kevin Williamson & Julie Plec	September 10, 2009	296766	4.91
In the small town of Mystic Falls, Virginia, 17-year-old Elena Gilbert and her younger brother Jeremy are both in denial over their parents' deaths. Elena withdraws emotionally and socially, Jeremy turns to drugs to numb his feelings, and both struggle to readjust on their first day back at school. A mysterious new student, Stefan Salvatore, catches Elena's attention, causing jealousy in her ex-boyfriend Matt Donovan and tension with her friend Caroline Forbes, who is also interested in Stefan. Encouraged by her best friend Bonnie Bennett, Elena considers talking to him but remains hesitant. After Matt's sister Vicki is attacked by what the town believes to be a wild animal, Stefan is revealed to be a vampire who refrains from feeding on humans. His estranged older brother Damon, a far more dangerous vampire, is ultimately revealed to be Vicki’s attacker.
2	2	"The Night of the Comet"	Marcos Siega	Kevin Williamson & Julie Plec	September 17, 2009	2J5001	3.78
Mystic Falls begins preparations to celebrate the passing of a comet. As Vicki recuperates in the hospital from Damon's attack, Stefan attempts to use mind compulsion to erase her memories of the attack, but is interrupted by Matt. At school, Mr. Tanner warns Elena and Jeremy's aunt and legal guardian Jenna Sommers about the latter's recent behavior. Elena visits the Salvatore home and meets Damon for the first time. He hints at a troubling past between him and Stefan, causing Elena to become suspicious, but she and Stefan grow closer and eventually kiss. Elsewhere, Damon finds his next victim in Caroline.
3	3	"Friday Night Bites"	John Dahl	Barbie Kligman & Bryan M. Holdman	September 24, 2009	2J5002	3.81
Bonnie, who possesses emerging psychic abilities, tells Elena her unease about Stefan, prompting Elena to invite both of them to dinner to introduce them. School athlete Tyler tries to embarrass Stefan by throwing a football at him, but Stefan effortlessly catches and returns it using his supernatural speed. Encouraged by Elena, Stefan joins the football team. During dinner, Damon and Caroline unexpectedly show up, and Elena unknowingly grants Damon access to her house by verbally inviting him in. Stefan gives Elena a necklace containing vervain to protect her from Damon. Later, Stefan attempts to appeal to Damon’s lost humanity, but Damon responds by killing Mr. Tanner.
4	4	"Family Ties"	Guy Ferland	Andrew Kreisberg & Brian Young	October 1, 2009	2J5003	3.53
Elena and Stefan attend the town's annual Founders' Party hosted by Tyler's parents. Vicki convinces Tyler to take her to the event after distancing herself from Jeremy. Meanwhile, Damon reveals the Salvatore brothers’ past to Elena in an attempt to sway her perception of Stefan. He retrieves an amber crystal from a historical artifact in the Lockwood estate. Unbeknownst to Damon, Stefan has laced Caroline's system with vervain, and when Damon feeds on her, he becomes weakened. After recovering, Caroline finds the crystal and, unaware of its power, takes it with her. Stefan confines Damon at the Salvatore home and assigns their distant nephew Zach to guard him. Meanwhile, members of the Founders Council—including Mayor Richard Lockwood, Carol Lockwood, Sheriff Liz Forbes, and reporter Logan Fell—conclude that vampires have returned to Mystic Falls due to recent deaths by blood loss. They begin a search for a Gilbert family heirloom: a compass. Vicki and Jeremy, having reconciled, retreat to the latter's room.
5	5	"You're Undead to Me"	Kevin Bray	Sean Reycraft & Gabrielle Stanton	October 8, 2009	2J5004	3.52
Damon grows increasingly weaker while confined in the basement, and Jeremy and Vicki grow closer. At the school-organized car wash, Bonnie's abilities manifest further. Meanwhile, Logan uses his charm to secure a dinner invitation at the Gilbert household, during which he discreetly steals the compass. Elena meets an elderly stranger who claims to have known a Stefan Salvatore in 1953, prompting her to later confront him. Damon manipulates Caroline into helping him escape, killing Zach and later feeding on Vicki.
6	6	"Lost Girls"	Marcos Siega	Kevin Williamson & Julie Plec	October 15, 2009	2J5005	3.88
Stefan reveals to Elena his and Damon's past with Katherine Pierce, a woman they both loved in 1864 who turned them into vampires. Without his daylight ring, Damon remains confined in the house with Vicki, whom he turns into a vampire. Stefan discovers them and attempts to persuade Vicki to resist feeding on human blood, which would complete the transition. Elsewhere, Logan uses the compass to locate vampires and tracks Stefan and Vicki in the woods. Mistaking Stefan for attacking Vicki, Logan shoots Stefan with a wooden bullet, but Damon intervenes. Vicki is overcome by vampiric hunger and feeds on Logan, killing him and completing her transformation. Stefan later informs Elena of the incident, and while she agrees to keep Vicki’s vampirism a secret, she ends her relationship with Stefan.
7	7	"Haunted"	Ernest Dickerson	Story by : Andrew Kreisberg; Teleplay by : Kevin Williamson & Julie Plec	October 29, 2009	2J5006	4.18
Stefan tries to help Vicki manage her hunger but is ultimately unable to control her. Caroline gives Bonnie the amber crystal from the Founders' Party. During a Halloween party at the school, Vicki loses control and attacks both Jeremy and Elena, forcing Stefan to kill her by staking her through the heart. He swears Elena to secrecy to hide the incident from Matt and Jeremy. Unable to comfort a devastated Jeremy, Elena pleads with Stefan to compel him to forget the events of the night. However, after Stefan tells her he is unsure of its effectiveness, Damon volunteers to "take away his suffering".
8	8	"162 Candles"	Rick Bota	Barbie Kligman & Gabrielle Stanton	November 5, 2009	2J5007	4.09
Lexi, a 350-year-old vampire and Stefan's best friend, arrives in Mystic Falls to celebrate his birthday and encourages Elena to consider rekindling her relationship with Stefan. Meanwhile, Jeremy quits drugs and resumes schoolwork after Damon alters his memories of Vicki's death. Damon gives Sheriff Forbes a box of vervain and earns her trust, prompting her to reveal the identities of local vampire hunters. Later, Damon frames Lexi for a local boy’s death by manipulating the memories of the boy's girlfriend. Lexi is arrested and, outside the bar, Damon kills her before she can expose him. Stefan, enraged by her death, tells Elena she was right to end their relationship and attacks Damon, but stops short of killing him after acknowledging that Damon recently saved his life. Bonnie, now wearing the amber crystal, has a disturbing nightmare and awakens in a cemetery.
9	9	"History Repeating"	Marcos Siega	Bryan M. Holdman & Brian Young	November 12, 2009	2J5008	4.10
Alaric Saltzman arrives in Mystic Falls as the new history teacher. Jeremy notices that Alaric wears a ring similar to Stefan and Damon's daylight rings and introduces him to Jenna, who becomes interested in Alaric. Meanwhile, Bonnie begins having visions of her ancestor Emily Bennett, and during a séance with Elena and Caroline, she becomes possessed by Emily. Damon reveals his true reason for returning to Mystic Falls: to free Katherine from the tomb beneath the ruins of Fell’s Church using the crystal originally given to Emily by Katherine. Stefan warns that doing so would also release the other vampires sealed inside and wreak havoc on the town. At the church ruins, Damon reminds Emily of their century-old pact—his protection of her bloodline in exchange for freeing Katherine—but Emily breaks the deal, destroys the crystal, and releases Bonnie from possession. Damon attacks Bonnie but Stefan intervenes and saves her. Shaken, Bonnie distances herself until Elena explains the truth about the brothers. Although Elena reaffirms her love for him, Stefan decides to leave town for her safety. Meanwhile, Logan unexpectedly returns as a vampire.
10	10	"The Turning Point"	J. Miller Tobin	Story by : Barbie Kligman; Teleplay by : Kevin Williamson & Julie Plec	November 19, 2009	2J5009	3.57
Jeremy returns to sketching, a hobby he had abandoned following his parents' deaths. Logan, now a vampire, begins killing several residents. Matt and Caroline grow closer, and Matt tells Tyler he enjoys spending time with her. Sheriff Forbes informs Damon of the attacks, and Damon learns that Logan is unaware of who turned him. Logan kidnaps Caroline during an argument with her mother, but Stefan and Damon intervene and rescue her. To Damon's intrigue, Logan then claims to know another way to free Katherine. Elena tells Stefan she loves him, convincing him to stay in Mystic Falls, and the two sleep together. However, Elena realizes she looks identical to Katherine after finding her photograph and leaves, leaving behind her vervain necklace. Alaric confronts and stakes Logan when he threatens Jenna. On her drive home, Elena crashes her car after swerving to avoid a mysterious man, who approaches as she regains consciousness and screams.
11	11	"Bloodlines"	David Barrett	Story by : Sean Reycraft; Teleplay by : Kevin Williamson & Julie Plec	January 21, 2010	2J5010	3.68
Damon's arrival causes the mysterious man to flee. He takes Elena to Georgia to see Bree, a witch and his old flame, hoping she can help unlock the tomb to free Katherine. Unbeknownst to Damon, Bree contacts Lee, Lexi’s boyfriend, who is seeking revenge for Lexi’s death. Elena saves Damon, and he kills Bree after she tells him to find Emily's spellbook. In Mystic Falls, Stefan talks with Bonnie's grandmother to help Bonnie accept her emerging powers and legacy as a Bennett witch. Jeremy meets a girl named Anna, who seems to possess knowledge of Mystic Falls' hidden history. Upon returning, Stefan reveals to Elena that he saved her the night her parents died and that she is not their biological daughter. Although shaken, Elena forgives Stefan after he reaffirms his love for her. Alaric sits at the Mystic Grill and recognizes Damon as the vampire who murdered his wife.
12	12	"Unpleasantville"	Liz Friedlander	Barbie Kligman & Brian Young	January 28, 2010	2J5011	3.71
As Stefan and Damon investigate the identity of the new vampire behind the attacks, Stefan gives Elena more vervain-infused jewelry to protect her loved ones. Strapped for money, Matt begins working as a busboy at Mystic Grill, where former high school football player Ben is now a bartender. Damon and Stefan accompany Elena to 1950s-themed school dance, where Alaric formally introduces himself to Damon. The brothers find and kill Noah, the vampire who has been stalking Elena. Before dying, he reveals that the key to opening the tomb lies in the Gilbert family journal. Meanwhile, Jenna and Alaric become closer, and Alaric reveals that his late wife's name was Isobel, the same name as Elena’s birth mother. Anna continues to pursue a friendship with Jeremy in hopes of accessing the journal. It is revealed that both Anna and Ben are vampires who also appear to be in a relationship.
13	13	"Children of the Damned"	Marcos Siega	Kevin Williamson & Julie Plec	February 4, 2010	2J5012	3.99
In 1864, Katherine attacks a carriage and feeds on its occupants before kissing Damon. In the present, Damon interrupts Elena and Stefan in bed and reminds them that he can still be trusted. In another flashback, the brothers recall how the townspeople, particularly their father Giuseppe, played a role in the events that ultimately drove them apart. In the present once more, Bonnie is abducted by Ben when she discovers he is a vampire. Elena helps the brothers in their search for the missing journal. Stefan learns that Alaric's interest in the journal is due to his connection with the town's vampire history. Anna, whose mother Pearl is revealed to be one the vampires trapped in the tomb, steals the journal from Alaric, but Stefan obtains a photocopy from him. He and Elena later retrieve the spellbook from Giuseppe Salvatore’s grave, but Damon arrives and takes it. Back at Elena’s house, Stefan realizes that Anna is with Jeremy and discovers that Elena has vanished.
14	14	"Fool Me Once"	Marcos Siega	Brett Conrad	February 11, 2010	2J5013	3.51
Elena wakes to find that she and Bonnie have been kidnapped by Anna and Ben. Stefan has been trying to find her and asks Damon for help, but he refuses. With help from Grams, Stefan eventually saves Elena and Bonnie. Stefan later ends up killing Ben for not obeying his order to leave town. Meanwhile, Jeremy asks Anna to a party in the woods, unaware that she has her own reasons for wanting to meet him there. With the help of Bonnie and Grams, the tomb is opened and Damon realizes that Katherine is not inside. Anna enters the tomb to find her mother Pearl and helps her escape by having her feed on Elena's blood. Stefan warns Damon that the seal of the tomb has only been temporarily broken, and Elena helps them both escape in order to not be sealed in forever. Out of the tomb, Elena sees how upset Damon is and comforts him. Damon afterward confronts Anna and Pearl, and learns that a smitten church guard had let Katherine go, and she was never inside the tomb. Anna admits to having seen Katherine in Chicago in 1983, but she was indifferent regarding Damon. At home, Bonnie checks on Grams, but finds that she has died from the strain back at the tomb. The episode ends with one of the vampires escaping from the tomb.
15	15	"A Few Good Men"	Joshua Butler	Brian Young	March 25, 2010	2J5014	3.33
Harper, the vampire who escaped from the tomb, kills a man in the woods and steals his clothes. Matt and Caroline are surprised by the sudden reappearance of Matt's drifter mother Kelly. Stefan and Elena are worried about Damon's new attitude. Meanwhile, Damon is asked by Sheriff Forbes to take part in a fund-raising bachelor auction and asks the Sheriff for information on Alaric. Alaric discovers that his wife Isobel was Elena's biological mother, and was turned into a vampire by Damon at her own request. He confronts Damon, and the confrontation ends when Damon stabs Alaric to death with a stake. However, Alaric comes back to life, saved by a mysterious ring that Isobel gave him. Elena is determined to find out everything she can about her birth mother, but encounters warnings – possibly from Isobel herself – to stay away. At the end of the episode, it is revealed that Harper will be staying with Anna and Pearl.
16	16	"There Goes the Neighborhood"	Kevin Bray	Bryan Oh & Andrew Chambliss	April 1, 2010	2J5015	2.80
Anna pays a visit to Damon, bringing along her mother Pearl, who wants to take control of the town. All the vampires in the tomb have been released, and most are staying at an old farmhouse on the outskirts of town. Pearl offers to help Damon find Katherine if he helps her out, but the visit turns violent when he turns her down. Meanwhile, Anna arrives unexpectedly at Jeremy's house. Jeremy cuts his hand to tempt Anna, who then sucks his blood, but is interrupted by Jenna. Elena, Stefan, Caroline, and Matt go on an awkward double date to Mystic Grill where Frederick, a now-freed vampire from the tomb, mistakes Elena for Katherine. Kelly, Jenna, and Damon have some drinks at the bar, but Jenna leaves when things start heating up between Damon and Kelly. Frederick and his girlfriend Bethanne, who blame the Salvatore brothers for their entombment, break into the boarding house and attack Stefan and Damon. Stefan stakes Bethanne, but Frederick escapes and returns to the farmhouse, where Pearl punishes him for leaving the house against her orders. At the end, Anna sneaks into Jeremy's room and chastises him for cutting himself in front of her to reveal her secret, but Jeremy insists that he did it because he wants her to turn him.
17	17	"Let the Right One In"	Dennis Smith	Story by : Brian Young; Teleplay by : Julie Plec	April 8, 2010	2J5016	3.48
A bad storm approaches Mystic Falls making the roads dangerous. Jeremy keeps trying to convince Anna to turn him, but she refuses. While out hunting, Stefan is captured by Frederic and his friends, who intend to torture him before killing him. Damon goes to the house, realizing he cannot get in because the owner of the house has been compelled not to invite him in. Damon and Elena therefore convince Alaric to work with them to help Stefan. Damon, however, will not allow Elena to come into the house with them. Pearl meets Mayor Lockwood in the Mystic Grill. Meanwhile, Matt is angry with his mother Kelly, but is fearful of pressuring her too much, afraid that she may leave again. Alaric enters the vampire house under the pretext of borrowing the phone. Damon kills the human living in the house, thus enabling him to enter. After her car breaks down in the storm, Caroline discovers the remains of Vicki Donovan in the woods. Matt and Kelly are heartbroken by the news. Damon and Elena rescue Stefan, but a fight erupts in which Damon and Alaric kill most of the vampires. Frederick comes after Elena and Stefan, wounding Stefan badly. Elena has to feed Stefan her blood to revive him. Stefan briefly loses control of himself. Anna agrees to turn Jeremy, but she then figures out (and he does not deny) that the real reason he wanted to be turned was to be with Vicki, whom he now knows to be dead. Damon discovers that Stefan has lost control of his blood lust, drinking large amounts of human blood from Damon's storage of IV bags.
18	18	"Under Control"	David Von Ancken	Barbie Kligman & Andrew Chambliss	April 15, 2010	2J5017	3.15
As Stefan struggles to maintain control of his new circumstances, Elena and Jeremy's uncle, John Gilbert, unexpectedly shows up in Mystic Falls. Stefan exhibits some unusual behavior at the Founder's Day event, and things turn ugly when Damon tries to find out why John Gilbert has returned. Meanwhile, Matt and Tyler find themselves in conflict after an incident at the party when Matt sees his mother making out with Tyler, which leads to a brutal fistfight between Matt and Tyler in front of the assembled guests. Afterward, Tyler's father angrily hits Tyler for letting him lose his temper, and Matt orders Kelly to move out. Damon and Alaric find out that John Gilbert has a ring just like Alaric's. John knows every history of Mystic Falls including Katherine and Elena's mother, Isobel. Elsewhere, Elena is unable to comfort Jeremy without revealing her knowledge of vampires which causes him to take action when he decides to sneak a look at her diary. Stefan is still out of control and finds himself drinking from Damon's cup which he left there to tempt Stefan.
19	19	"Miss Mystic Falls"	Marcos Siega	Bryan Oh & Caroline Dries	April 22, 2010	2J5018	3.33
The episode begins with Stefan going back to school. Elena approaches him, surprised to see him there, but he claims that his cravings for human blood are over. At the Founder's Day Gala, Elena and Caroline compete in the "Miss Mystic Falls" contest. Bonnie returns to town and Elena is very happy to have her back, but Bonnie is cold and distant. Bonnie reveals that she feels angry and alienated with Elena because of her association with the Salvatore brothers. At the Miss Mystic Falls contest, Damon tells Elena that Stefan has been drinking human blood again. Stefan is angry when Elena confronts him with this information, and breaks a mirror. One of the Miss Mystic Falls contestants, Amber Daly, sees him do this, so Stefan takes her. Anna shows up at the dance, and Jeremy attempts to apologize for using her to become a vampire. Jeremy tells Anna that he knows that the only reason Anna wanted to be friends with him was so she could use his blood to revive her mother. Anna asks Jeremy how much he knows and he says he knows everything. Anna and Jeremy make up and Anna says she would never do anything to hurt him. Back at the dance, Damon poses as Elena's escort, since Stefan is not there. Later Elena and Damon, with help from Bonnie, locate and subdue Stefan after seeing him in the woods feeding off of Amber. Meanwhile, John Gilbert tries unsuccessfully to intimidate Damon. The episode ends with Elena injecting vervain into Stefan. She and Damon lock him in the cellar in an attempt to help him control his blood urges.
20	20	"Blood Brothers"	Liz Friedlander	Kevin Williamson & Julie Plec	April 29, 2010	2J5019	3.39
As Stefan tries to come to terms with his past, he and Damon reveal pieces of their history to Elena, including the truth about how they were turned into vampires. Stefan recalls that in 1864 when Katherine was taken away they tried to save her but were shot by their father. They both then woke up in transition by a lake with Bonnie's ancestor explaining that Katherine had been compelling Stefan to drink her blood and Damon had been voluntarily drinking her blood. Stefan then went to his home to explain to his father that he wasn't going to complete the transition but his father wouldn't listen. His father tried staking him but accidentally staked himself. Stefan tried to help his father but was overcome by the amount of blood and fed off of him, thereby completing the transition. Damon reveals that Stefan tried to convince him to complete the transition by telling him good he felt and how he could turn off his emotions, and when that failed he compelled a woman to come with him, bit her, and held her bleeding neck near his face until he gave in and fed. Pearl and John Gilbert have an ugly confrontation. Meanwhile, Damon and Alaric attempt to track down a mysterious invention before John can find it. Jeremy and Anna's relationship continues to grow as Anna enrolls at Jeremy's high school just so they could spend time together, and Jeremy attempts to learn as much as possible from her. In the end, John Gilbert kills Pearl by staking her and Anna discovers her body. When Elena releases him, Stefan goes blood crazy and wants to die but Elena manages to talk him out of it. They return to the house and Stefan seems to be cured of the blood-craze, but Damon doesn't seem happy about it.
21	21	"Isobel"	J. Miller Tobin	Caroline Dries & Brian Young	May 6, 2010	2J5020	3.31
Isobel returns to town and surprises Alaric with her new cynical and cruel attitude and her demand that he arrange for her to meet Elena; despite her seeming indifference toward him, it appears that she still loves him and that she is not truly happy with her life as a vampire. When Elena and Isobel finally meet, Isobel refuses to answer most of Elena's questions, but states that she is also looking for the mysterious invention that John Gilbert has been seeking. Upon learning that Damon has the device, Isobel orders Elena to obtain the device from Damon and threatens to kill everyone Elena knows if she refuses. It soon becomes apparent that both Isobel and John are working for Katherine. Isobel attempts to intimidate Damon into giving her the device and offers to reveal Katherine's whereabouts in return, but he makes it clear that he will not tolerate her threatening him or the people he cares about, and that he no longer wants anything to do with Katherine. Isobel later kidnaps Jeremy in order to force Elena's hand, and Elena implores Damon to give her the device, which he does. Bonnie offers to remove the spell from the device, which can supposedly kill vampires; it is later revealed that Bonnie only pretended to deactivate the device, due to her vendetta against all vampires. Elena gives the device to Isobel, who reveals that she knew Damon would surrender the device to Elena because he's in love with her. It is revealed that John is Elena's biological father, and that he and Isobel had dated in high school. John plans to use the device to kill all the vampires in Mystic Falls, including Stefan and Damon. Before leaving town, Isobel, who appears to care for Elena after all, expresses her fear that the Salvatore brothers may eventually turn Elena into a vampire – a life that she doesn't want for Elena – and that getting rid of them is the best thing she and John could do for their daughter. Anna appears and tells Jeremy that her mother was killed, and that she knows she should not be there, but she has nowhere else to go. Jeremy hugs her and attempts to comfort her.
22	22	"Founder's Day"	Marcos Siega	Bryan Oh & Andrew Chambliss	May 13, 2010	2J5021	3.47
It is Founder's Day, and everyone is preparing for floats and fireworks. Jeremy, still angry at Elena for lying to him about everything, seeks Anna's company; Anna gives him a vial of her blood and offers him the choice of becoming a vampire. Though Damon and Alaric team up to try to stop John Gilbert from utilizing the mysterious device to kill vampires, John sets his plan in motion, leading to a chaotic, destructive, and deadly end to the Founder's Day celebration. Tyler, Caroline and Matt are in a car when Tyler suddenly succumbs to the device, which generates a high-pitched hertz signal, causing him to lose control of the car. Caroline is severely injured in the crash. Tyler's father, Mayor Lockwood, also succumbs to the signal. John kills Anna and burns many of the tomb vampires alive in the basement of an old building. Tyler's father dies along with them. Stefan realizes that, despite everything Damon has done, he does love his brother. Elena confronts John with the fact that he is her father, which was confirmed previously by Stefan. Bonnie saves Stefan and Damon from John's rampage for Elena's sake but tells Stefan that if Damon kills another innocent person, she will not hesitate to take him or Stefan down. Damon finally realizes that there is some good in him, and that he may actually want to become a better person. Jeremy learns of Anna's death; he drinks Anna's blood and overdoses on pain pills, hoping that his emotional pain will ease if he becomes a vampire. Damon kisses a person whom he believes to be Elena, who is then invited into Elena's house by Jenna. The Elena doppelgänger stabs John Gilbert, who recognizes her as Katherine, pretending to be Elena. The season ends with the real Elena entering the house and going toward the kitchen, where Katherine is waiting...

== Production ==
On February 6, 2009, Variety announced that The CW had greenlit the pilot for The Vampire Diaries with Kevin Williamson and Julie Plec set as the head writers and executive producers. On May 19, 2009, the series was officially ordered for the 2009–2010 season.

The pilot was filmed in Vancouver, but the rest of the episodes have been filmed in Covington, Georgia (which doubles as the fictional small town of Mystic Falls, Virginia) and various other communities around Greater Atlanta. The series was given a full, 22-episode order on October 31, 2009, after strong ratings for the first half of the season.

== Storylines ==
The season begins after the deaths of Elena and Jeremy Gilbert's parents. Both are put in their Aunt Jenna's custody. Jeremy has become a loner and Elena starts dating a boy named Stefan Salvatore. It is soon revealed that Stefan is a vampire and his brother Damon shows up in Mystic Falls and kills people at random.

Another supernatural revelation occurs when Elena's friend Bonnie Bennett discovers she is born into a line of witches and is a witch herself. She gets help from her grandmother to use her powers. Elena's friends and acquaintances also become involved such as Tyler Lockwood, son of the mayor, and Matt Donovan, Elena's ex-boyfriend and Caroline Forbes, daughter of the sheriff. It also turns out that Elena is the doppelganger of Katherine Pierce, a woman who, centuries ago, seduced the Salvatore brothers and turned them into vampires, turning their vampire hunting father against them, though Stefan ends up killing him. Katherine was presumably trapped in a tomb beneath the church and Damon is planning on releasing her. Lexi, a friend of Stefan's shows up and befriends Elena, but is killed by Damon, driving a wedge between brothers.

Jeremy falls in love with Vicki Donovan, Matt's sister, who uses drugs like him, but she was dating Tyler and starts a rivalry between the boys. Vicki breaks up with Tyler for Jeremy. She is later turned into a vampire by Damon, but her bloodlust was out of control and she is killed by Stefan. Jeremy witnesses this and Elena asks Damon to make Jeremy forget this to spare him the pain. Matt on the other hand is devastated.

After the history teacher is killed, a man named Alaric is hired to take his place. Alaric came to town to kill Damon, believing him to have killed his wife, Isobel. Damon tries to kill him in self-defense, but Alaric wears a ring that keeps him from dying at supernatural hands. It is revealed Damon didn't kill Isobel, but turned her into a vampire on her own account. Later, Alaric and Damon become friends.

At one point, Damon finds the tomb under the church, and has Bonnie and her grandmother help open it to find Katherine. During the search, a number of vampires escape, and it is discovered Katherine already escaped long ago. The tomb vampires are led by a female vampire named Pearl and her daughter Anna. Bonnie's grand mother dies and Bonnie begins to resent vampires. It also turns out a group called the Founder's Council know of the vampires and wish to kill them. The council is led by Tyler's abusive father, Richard Lockwood. Caroline's mother, Sheriff Elizabeth Forbes is also a member, despite being friends with Damon, unknown that he is a vampire. Anna also starts a relationship with Jeremy. Jenna also starts dating a man named Logan, who cheated on her in the past. Soon, Logan is turned into a vampire by Anna, and is killed by Alaric, who tells her he left town. From that point Jenna starts dating Alaric.

It is not long before Elena and Jeremy's uncle John, who they grew up hating shows up. John is working for the council. The Council wish to use the Gilbert device to kill all vampires in Mystic Falls. Damon tries to kill John, but he is wearing a ring similar to Alaric's. It is revealed that John and Isobel, Alaric's vampire wife, are Elena's biological parents, they had Elena adopted by John's brother for her protection. It turns out they are also working for Katherine, and are using Mayor Lockwood and the others as pawns, although Isobel tells Elena their unofficial goal is to protect her.

In the seasons climax, during Founders day, Richard and John execute their plan to kill the vampires, both willing to use innocent people as collateral damage. Sheriff Forbes tries to oppose their plan, but is knocked out by John and chained up. John uses the local police who are in on the scheme as foot soldiers. The device is activated and the vampires are neutralized and taken away to be burnt in a basement, but Tyler is affected by the device as he had supernatural genes himself (later revealed to be werewolf); since Richard has these genes, the deputies think he is a vampire and lock him in the basement where he is burnt alive and killed by the vampires. Richard's wife, Carol goes to the station to rescue the sheriff but they are unable to save Richard. John also kills Anna, so Jeremy, not wanting to deal with the pain tries to become a vampire via Anna's blood. During the fiasco, Caroline is in a car accident, Elena also confronts John with the knowledge that he's her father and Bonnie rescues the Salvatore brothers, letting them off with a warning so Damon doesn't kill anyone innocent.

Sheriff Forbes finds her daughter has been injured and goes to the hospital where she is comforted by Damon. John heads home and finds Katherine, who is posing as Elena. Katherine stabs John several times and severs his ring finger and leaves him to die. As Katherine leaves, Elena comes in and finds her father injured.

== Reception ==
=== Critical response ===
On Rotten Tomatoes, the season as an approval rating of 73% based on 30 reviews, with an average rating of 6.9/10. The site's critics consensus reads: "It's not particularly innovative and there's a lot of angsty brooding going on, but there's a self-referential cheekiness in The Vampire Diaries that will appeal directly to its target audience."

The initial reception of the show was mixed, Entertainment Weekly gave the pilot a B+, stating that the show "signals a welcome return to form for writer-producer Kevin Williamson". They end by saying that "Diaries promises us a season of sharp-tongued amusement." Metacritic gave the show a score of 50/100 based on 22 critical reviews, indicating "mixed or average" reviews.

Many critics felt that the series improved with each episode. Sarah Hughes of The Independent says The Vampire Diaries turns into "a well-crafted, interestingly developed series" despite a poor opening episode. The New York Post also praised the portrayal of Elena, finding the character to be a strong-minded woman who doesn't allow her feelings for her boyfriend to control her. The San Diego Union-Tribune said: "The supernatural drama is a first-class production, featuring an insanely gorgeous cast, sharp scripts and a brooding vibe that is hard for even the most levelheaded adult to resist." Mike Hale of The New York Times gave the series an honorable mention on his list of the top TV shows of 2009.

=== Broadcast ===
The Vampire Diaries premiered on September 10, 2009, and gave The CW its biggest series premiere ratings in its network history scoring 4.9 million viewers. Adding in DVR numbers, the ratings for the premiere increased to 5.7 million viewers. Although ratings decreased as the season went on, it reached a series high in adults 18–34 (2.3/7) on October 29, with the broadcast of its Halloween episode. Including DVR ratings the second episode brought in 4.7 million viewers, the third 4.6 million, the fourth 4.3 million, the fifth 4.4 million, the sixth 4.6 million, the ninth 4.9 million, and 4.3 million viewers for the fifteenth episode.

Season 1 of The Vampire Diaries aired in Urdu language in Pakistan on FILMAX. The series was the No. 1 show on The CW for the 2009–10 season averaging 3.60 million viewers weekly, thus becoming the first show to overtake America's Next Top Model which had been The CW's No. 1 show since the network began in 2006.

=== Ratings ===
No.	Title	Air date	18–49 rating (Live + SD)	Viewers (millions) increase	Total 18-49 increase	Total viewers (millions)	Ref
01	"Pilot"	September 10, 2009	1.9	1.96	2.6	8.78	
02	"The Night of the Comet"	September 17, 2009	1.6	1.46	2.1	8.70	
03	"Friday Night Bites"	September 24, 2009	1.7	0.85	2.2	9.69	
04	"Family Ties"	October 1, 2009	1.6	0.88	2.0	7.33	
05	"Your Undead To Me"	October 8, 2009	1.7	1.02	2.2	9.55	
06	"Lost Girls"	October 15, 2009	1.8	1.48	2.3	5.62	

=== Accolades ===
For its first season The Vampire Diaries won seven Teen Choice Awards and one People's Choice Award.

== Home media releases ==
Season one was released on DVD in Regions 1, 2 and 4 and on Blu-ray in Regions A and B. Both United States versions include commentary by cast and crew members on selected episodes, deleted scenes, behind-the-scenes featurettes, webisodes, and a downloadable audiobook of L.J. Smith's The Vampire Diaries: The Awakening. It was released on DVD in Region 2 on August 23, 2010. Following that release, Region 1 began selling DVDs on August 31, 2010, and Region 4 on September 1, 2010. In Region A, it was released on Blu-ray on August 31, 2010. Region B's releases varied; United Kingdom on August 23, 2010, Brazil on August 26, 2010, and Australia on September 1, 2010.
