= Let the Right One In (The Vampire Diaries) =

- The Vampire Diaries episode
- Episode no.: Season 1 Episode 17
- Directed by: Dennis Smith
- Story by: Brian Young
- Teleplay by: Julie Plec
- Cinematography by: Paul M. Sommers
- Editing by: Shawn Paper
- Production code: 2J5016
- Original air date: April 8, 2010

Guest appearances
- Malese Jow as Anna; Kelly Hu as Pearl; Sterling Sulieman as Harper; Marguerite MacIntyre as Liz Forbes; Stephen Martines as Frederick; Melinda Clarke as Kelly Donovan

Episode chronology
← Previous "There Goes the Neighborhood"	Next → "Under Control"
- The Vampire Diaries season 1

"Let the Right One In" is the seventeenth episode of the first season of the American supernatural teen drama television series The Vampire Diaries. It aired on The CW on April 8, 2010. The episode's teleplay was written by series co-developer Julie Plec based on a story by staff writer Brian Young, while Dennis Smith served as director.

== Plot ==
Anna (Malese Jow) is still at Jeremy's (Steven R. McQueen) room where Jeremy tries to convince her to turn him but she does not agree with it. Elena (Nina Dobrev) knocks on the door to ask Jeremy's help on checking all the windows due to the storm and Anna disappears before she opens the door.

Frederick (Stephen Martines) wants to go hunting with Anna but Pearl (Kelly Hu) does not allow him to. While Pearl plans her next trip into town where she will continue her research on how to get their town back, Frederick allies with the rest of the vampires who are all wanting to take their revenge on the Salvatore brothers and humans now and do not want to wait.

Damon (Ian Somerhalder) explains Pearl's plan to Stefan (Paul Wesley) and Elena cannot believe that he made a deal with her. Damon leaves and Stefan promises Elena to handle the situation.

Anna and Jeremy meet at the Grill where Jeremy tries once again to convince Anna to turn him. She asks him to keep her secret from everyone and she sees his bracelet with the vervain that Elena gave him. Jeremy offers to give it to her since she likes it so much but she gives it back to him and asks him to keep wearing it. Pearl gets into the Grill to find and take Anna and Anna gets up to walk away from Jeremy sending him a text to explain that her mother walked in. On their way out they run into Mayor Lockwood (Robert Pralgo) and Tyler (Michael Trevino). Mayor asks them not to go out in the storm and invites them to join them for dinner but Pearl declines. She hears his name on her way out and changes her mind coming back.

Meanwhile, Stefan is weakened by the fight with Frederick and Bethanne and goes out for hunting alone. Frederick and the other vampires find him, they stab him in the gut and take him to their house. Damon worries about Stefan not coming back home and not answering his phone and goes to Elena to ask if he is there. He suspects that Stefan has been taken by Pearl's vampires and his suspicions are confirmed when he visits the house and Frederick answers the door. They show him Stefan who is wounded but Damon can't enter the house to help him without invitation.

Damon tells Elena that Stefan is in the house but he cannot get in. Elena wants to go herself but Damon stops her. He knows that they have to save Stefan but does not know how. They go to school to ask Alaric's (Matt Davis) help since he knows about vampires, has weapons and the ring that protects him. Alaric denies to help them but he accepts when Damon tells him that Pearl can lead him to Isobel.

Meanwhile, the vampires keep torturing Stefan by stringing him up on vervain-laced ropes and stabbing him. Harper (Sterling Sulieman) shows up and tries to stop them since Pearl would not agree to this but the other vampires tie him up as well and stake him on the legs.

Damon and Alaric make their plan while Elena insists to go into the house with them. Damon refuses and explains her why she cannot get into that house that is, in case she does not know, full of vampires. Elena can drive the car but she has to stay in it while the two of them try to help Stefan.

Alaric knocks on Pearl's door and when Frederick answers he tells him that he needs to use his phone because his car broke down. Frederick lets him in and when Alaric is led to the kitchen, he stakes the vampire who'is there and leads Miss Gibbons (Tiffany Morgan) to the door but she refuses to invite Damon in since she is compelled not to do it. Damon asks if there are any other living people who live in this house and when he is sure that there are not, he breaks her neck and gets in.

Back at the Grill, Pearl tries to get as many details as she can from the Mayor about his family at the dinner. Anna and Jeremy exchange texts from across the room but Pearl notices and asks the Mayor who is the boy. He tells her that his name is Jeremy Gilbert. Pearl follows Anna to the ladies' room and confronts her about Jeremy. She tells her the Gilbert family is the reason she was trapped in the tomb for over a century and asks her to stop seeing him because when he finds out what she is he will turn on her. Anna reveals that Jeremy already knows and Pearl slaps her. Anna walks out of the Grill texting Jeremy: "I'll do it".

Damon keeps looking for Stefan killing some other vampires in the process. Alaric returns to the car but Elena is not there so he goes back to the house knowing that she went there to help Stefan. Elena sneaks into the basement getting herself in trouble before Damon appears to save her. They find Stefan and Harper and they free them. Damon goes to distract Frederick, who already got suspicious that something is going on, while Elena helps Stefan to get out.

Damon fights with Frederick and two other vampires when Alaric shows up to help him. Frederick escapes and Damon searches the house to find him but he is not there. They try to get out to head to the car but a bunch of vampires appear and they return in. Pearl and Anna return home to find them inside. Damon explains what happened before he and Alaric walk out the door, leaving Pearl and Anna behind with all the vampire bodies.

Stefan and Elena make it back to the car but the key is missing. Frederick shows up and starts hitting and stabbing Stefan. He is about to kill him when Elena stabs him in the back. Stefan tells Elena to run but she gives him her wrist to drink from so he can regain his strength. Stefan tries to resist but eventually he drinks and manages to kill Frederick.

In the meantime, Caroline (Candice Accola) has to drive to a family engagement in the storm and she leaves after she says goodbye to Matt (Zach Roerig). The main roads are closed so she drives in the backwoods when her car gets stuck in the mud. She has no cell reception so she decides to get out trying to get one and call for help. She falls down and grabs a tree root to steady herself only to discover that it is a human arm.

Matt and Kelly (Melinda Clarke) prepare their dinner when the doorbell rings and Caroline is at the door with her mom, Liz (Marguerite MacIntyre). They ask to see Kelly and they inform her, and Matt, that they found Vicky's body. Liz calls the Mayor to let him know. When he tells Tyler they have to go, he tells him about Vicky and Jeremy also hears. Tyler and Jeremy head to Matt's house and Jeremy also calls Elena to tell her.

Elena and Jeremy return home where Jeremy finds Anna waiting on his room. Anna realizes that Jeremy only wanted to turn to find Vicky and she takes off before Jeremy apologizes.

Damon sits next to Alaric at the bar for a drink and tries to have a friend-talk with him but Alaric punches him and leaves. Damon returns home and finds IV blood bags all over the place and Stefan drinking from one.

== Feature music ==
In "Let the Right One In" we can hear the songs:

- "All You Wanted" by Sounds Under Radio
- "Conscience Killer" by Black Rebel Motorcycle Club
- "East" by Systems Officer
- "Boy" by Lights On
- "Young Men Dead" by The Black Angels
- "Resignation Studies" by The Silent League
- "I Was Wrong" by The Morning Benders
- "Let Me Take You Out" by Class Actress
- "Young Lovers (Sam Sparrow Mix)" by Love Grenades

== Reception ==
=== Ratings ===
In its original American broadcast, "Let the Right One In" was watched by 3.48 million; up by 0.68 from the previous episode.

=== Reviews ===
"Let the Right One In" received positive reviews.

Matt Richenthal of TV Fanatic rated the episode with 4.2/5. "While "Let the Right One In" didn't delve much into the show's mythology, it held nothing back when it came to blood, gore and violence. [...] From Stefan getting tortured like Jack Bauer, to multiple stake stabbings and blood sucking, this episode was filled with the sort of fare not typically scene on television at 8 p.m."

Josie Kafka from Doux Reviews rated the episode with 3/4. "Our heroes and our villains are choosing sides. Damon, Elena, and Alaric made an alliance to save Stefan, the tombies are replaying the civil war, and Jeremy is trying to bat for the other team. With only five episodes left until the finale, it seems like some serious battle lines are being drawn."

Robin Franson Pruter rated the episode with 3/4 saying that the episode presages a major development in the character of Stefan Salvatore. "This episode only hints at the full import of what occurs, but the events here begin a huge unpacking of the complexity of the character of Stefan. [...] No words are said in this final scene. Wesley and Somerhalder convey much with just an exchange of glances, Stefan’s guilty desperation, Damon’s apprehension, suggesting that, whatever this means, it doesn’t bode well." and she closes her review: "This episode presents strong character development (Alaric excluded), examines the evolving and deepening of relationships between these characters, and offers an exciting storyline that evolves from those characters and relationships, even as that story deepens what we know about them."

Popsugar from Buzzsugar gave a good review to the episode. "I'll admit that I wasn't sure how the Salvatore brothers could survive this week's The Vampire Diaries. When Stefan gets nabbed by Frederick and his fanged friends, you basically have the perfect setup for a bloodbath — and the episode doesn't disappoint in that department." Popsugar also commented on the Elena/Damon relationship saying: "Can you say sexual tension? Elena and Damon get into it while standing thisclose (in the rain, no less) as they argue about if Elena can go to save Stefan. They really have a nice mix of heat and genuine concern for each other. I guess time will only tell when/if these two get together."

Zeba of Two Cents TV also gave a good review to the episode saying that it was more thrilling than last week’s. "Things got a little crazy on last night’s episode of the Vampire Diaries, and if you guessed that most of the craziness came from Miss Pearl’s gang of misfit vampires, led by the sketchy Frederick – then you are so right."

Tiffany Vogt of The TV Watchtower gave a good review to the episode. "Once the crypt was opened, we knew that a blood-bath was coming to Mystic Falls. We just did not foresee that it would be a vampire blood-bath. Who knew that the entombed vamps would be so blood-thirsty for revenge on their fellow vamps, Stefan and Damon?"
