= Blood Brothers (The Vampire Diaries) =

- The Vampire Diaries episode
- Episode no.: Season 1 Episode 20
- Directed by: Liz Friedlander
- Written by: Kevin Williamson; Julie Plec
- Cinematography by: Paul M. Sommers
- Editing by: Sunny Hodge
- Production code: 2J5019
- Original air date: April 29, 2010

Guest appearances
- James Remar as Giuseppe Salvatore; Mia Kirshner as Isobel Flemming; Malese Jow as Anna; Kelly Hu as Pearl; David Anders as John Gilbert; Bianca Lawson as Emily Bennett; Sterling Sulieman as Harper

Episode chronology
← Previous "Miss Mystic Falls"	Next → "Isobel"
- The Vampire Diaries season 1

"Blood Brothers" is the twentieth episode of the first season of the American supernatural teen drama television series The Vampire Diaries. It aired on The CW on April 29, 2010. The episode was written by series developers Kevin Williamson and Julie Plec, and directed by Liz Friedlander.

== Plot ==
Stefan (Paul Wesley) is still locked up in the basement and he is hallucinating because of the lack of blood. He flashes back to 1864, the night Katherine (Nina Dobrev) got taken. He and Damon (Ian Somerhalder) try to save her, Stefan distracting the guards of the prison truck and Damon getting her out. The moment they try to untie her, Damon is shot from afar and dies. Stefan is also shot and dies a moment later. He wakes up in a quarry and Emily (Bianca Lawson) is there who explains to him what happened. He and Damon are both in transition and she made them the rings to protect them from the sunlight at Katherine's request. Stefan says he never drank Katherine's blood but Emily tells him she was compelling him to do it, while Damon was doing it willingly.

In the present day, Damon brings Stefan some animal blood to drink but Stefan denies it saying he is not hungry. Damon throws the bottle in the cell and leaves when Alaric (Matt Davis) calls him to inform him what he has found about John (David Anders). He tracked some calls to Grove Hill and the two of them plan to go and check it out.

John tries to talk with Elena and tells her that he knows she knows. When he asks her what her mother would think of all these, Elena makes him understand that she knows her birth mother is Isobel who is a vampire herself and she leaves.

Anna (Malese Jow) is now a student at Mystic Falls High and she is happy to see Jeremy (Steven R. McQueen) while Pearl (Kelly Hu) meets John at the Grill. She tells him that she will not give him the Gilbert gadget he wants and John tries to use her "weakness" for Gilbert men due to her past with Jonathan Gilbert to get it. He makes fun of her by telling her that Jonathan felt so guilty for betraying her because he loved her and then laughing he tells her that Jonathan hated her. Pearl is upset and before she leaves, she tells him that she gave the device to Damon.

In 1864, Damon and Stefan discuss about their new state with Damon saying that he doesn't want to complete the transition and prefers to starve to death since Katherine is gone and there is no purpose to continue living. Stefan decides not to turn as well and heads to his home because he wants to say goodbye to his father Giuseppe (James Remar) before he dies. Giuseppe freaks out when he sees Stefan and tells him that he was the one who shot and killed his sons. Believing that Stefan is now a vampire, he attacks him and Stefan - not knowing his own strength - hurtles his father away in defense. Giuseppe gets hurt and starts bleeding and Stefan does not have the strength to resist to his need for blood and he feeds on his father completing his transformation.

Back in the present day, Elena visits Stefan in his cell ignoring Damon's warnings not to go down there alone. She tries to make him drink the blood but Stefan still refuses it. She opens the cell door and goes in. Stefan tries to scare her away but Elena does not go anywhere. He finally takes the blood and drinks while he is telling Elena the whole story of how he completed his transformation. Elena is shocked at the story but not turned off and she wants him to keep talking to her. She leaves to give him some space but puts his ring next to him telling him she will be upstairs to wait for him to continue their conversation.

In the meantime, Alaric and Damon arrive at the house John's phone calls were tracked to and they run into a vampire named Henry (Evan Gamble). Henry attacks Alaric but Damon throws him off recognizing him from the tomb. Henry tells them that John helped him get used to the modern world and in return, Henry keeps tabs on the other vampires from the tomb. Henry's phone rings and Damon offers to answer it since it is John but when he does not, Henry suspects that something is not right and he tries to attack Alaric again who stakes him in the heart and kills him. Alaric and Damon talk about not finding anything about Isobel and Alaric decides that he should stop looking for answers and let it go.

Anna comes back home and finds Pearl packing and telling her they are leaving town because too many people in Mystic Falls know the truth and they are not safe. Anna does not want to leave and Pearl lets her make her own decision for once and if she wants to stay she is free to do it. Anna leaves to pay Jeremy a last visit before they go.

Damon comes back home to find Elena waiting for Stefan come upstairs. She tells Damon that Stefan is depressed and it might have helped if he had not spent all those years making Stefan feel guilty over Katherine. Damon gets mad with that and he fills her in on the rest of the story, after Stefan fed on their father and came back to where Damon was.

In 1864, Damon still tries to resist human blood when Stefan arrives with a young girl as a gift for him to feed on. Stefan admits that he fed on their father and he keeps telling Damon how better he feels now and insists that Damon needs to complete the transformation. Damon does not want to do it but Stefan bites the girl's neck making it bleed. He pushes Damon closer to her blood and Damon cannot resist so he finally drinks from her.

Elena, after hearing the whole story, realizes the reason Stefan wants to die and runs downstairs to find him but he is gone and he left his ring behind. Stefan goes to the place where the quarry was once, where he brought Damon that girl to feed on. He remembers newly turned Damon promises him that he would make his eternity an eternity of misery. Then Emily appears to tell him that she only helped him because she owed Katherine and that his heart is pure and that will be his curse because that will make him feel guilty for every person he hurts.

Stefan's memories bring him back to present where Elena finds him. She knew where he would be after Damon told her the whole story. Elena tries to talk to him and make him see that he is not responsible of everything that happened since they cannot control everything. She tries to tell him that he is a good person and Stefan tells her that it hurts to try be good because every time he fights his need for human blood it hurts. He is afraid that if he continues living he doesn't know if he'll be able to fight this forever. Elena gives him his ring and tells him he has a choice; throw it away and die or put it on and keep fighting. She turns to leave when Stefan calls her out, he puts his ring on and they kiss.

Pearl and Harper (Sterling Sulieman) finished packing and they are ready to leave town. Pearl opens the door but she drops dead after someone stakes her in the heart. Anna, returns home after to find both, Pearl and Harper, dead. Outside, John throws his stake gun into his car and calls Sheriff Forbes (Marguerite MacIntyre) to update her about the vampires.

Elena and Stefan return to the Salvatore house. Elena goes upstairs leaving the two brothers alone. Stefan thanks Damon for helping him through his withdrawal and Damon tells him that there is no need for him to carry his own guilt as well. Before Damon leaves, he admits that the reason he was always being mad at Stefan was not because he betrayed Katherine and the others took her to kill her or because he made him complete his transformation, but because Katherine was supposed to turn only him but she turned both of them.

The episode ends with Alaric having a drink at the bar when a familiar voice greets him. Alaric does not look surprised to hear it, turns around and sees Isobel (Mia Kirshner) standing in front of him.

== Feature music ==
In "Blood Brothers" we can hear the songs:

- "We'll Be a Dream" by We the Kings featuring Demi Lovato
- "Song for the Waiting" by Aron Wright
- "I'll Be Thinking of You" by Jamie McDonald
- "In Line" by Robert Skoro
- "Marchin On" by OneRepublic
- "Click" by Little Boots

== Reception ==
=== Ratings ===
In its original American broadcast, "Blood Brothers" was watched by 3.39 million; slightly up from the previous episode by 0.06.

=== Reviews ===
"Blood Brothers" received positive reviews.

Matt Richenthal of TV Fanatic rated the episode with 5/5 saying that this was a terrific episode. "It's official: The Vampire Diaries has more layers than an onion. It has more twists than a bag of pretzels. Food metaphors aside, "Blood Brothers" was an incredible, revealing episode. Viewers learned a lot more about the rich history between Stefan and Damon. These revelations were fast, furious, unexpected - and hardcore."

Robin Franson Pruter from Forced Viewing rated the episode with 4/4 saying that the episode "provides strong character development as it delves into the story of how the Salvatore brothers became vampires" and she closes her review: "This episode shows the strengths of the series—strong character development, rich and evolving relationships between those characters, and well-plotted storytelling."

Popsugar from Buzzsugar gave a good review to the episode saying that "the flashback episodes of this show are always solid, but this one is particularly satisfying for the answers it gives us." Popsugar also comments on the development of the relationship between Damon and Elena: "Elena and Damon's relationship is growing in baby steps, and their current stage is as allies while they tend to locked-up Stefan. They even get to a place of good-naturedly joking with each other. I loved Damon's "Ew, gross!" response when Elena asks him about Stefan's favorite animal to eat."

Meg from Two Cents TV also gave a good review to the episode saying that it had a little bit of everything: "strategic shirtlessness, accidental patricide, twisty revelations, and a startling assassination."
