= Children of the Damned (The Vampire Diaries) =

- The Vampire Diaries episode
- Episode no.: Season 1 Episode 13
- Directed by: Marcos Siega
- Written by: Kevin Williamson; Julie Plec
- Cinematography by: Paul M. Sommers
- Editing by: Joshua Butler
- Production code: 2J5012
- Original air date: February 4, 2010

Guest appearances
- Matt Davis as Alaric Saltzman; James Remar as Giuseppe Salvatore; Malese Jow Anna; Bianca Lawson as Emily Bennett; Kelly Hu as Pearl; Sean Faris as Ben McKittrick

Episode chronology
← Previous "Unpleasantville"	Next → "Fool Me Once"
- The Vampire Diaries season 1

"Children of the Damned" is the thirteenth episode of the first season of the American supernatural teen drama television series The Vampire Diaries. It aired on The CW on February 4, 2010. The episode was written by series developers Kevin Williamson and Julie Plec, and directed by consulting producer Marcos Siega.

== Plot ==
In 1864, Katherine (Nina Dobrev) stops a horse-drawn carriage and asks for help because her husband has been attacked. A man is laying on the road and one of the two men from the carriage goes to help him. Katherine attacks the one who left at the carriage and then the other one. Her "husband" gets up and it is revealed to be Damon (Ian Somerhalder) who is still human and Katherine teaches him how a vampire acts.

In the present day, Damon enters Stefan's (Paul Wesley) room without caring he is with Elena. He wants to start looking for the Grimoire and Stefan promised to help him, which for him means Elena is also helping. He asks her to find Jonathan Gilbert's journal that is the key to where the Grimoire is.

Anna (Malese Jow) calls Jeremy (Steven R. McQueen) trying to arrange a date with him while Ben (Sean Faris) is getting ready for his date with Bonnie (Kat Graham) later. Meanwhile, at the Gilbert house, Elena and Stefan talk about Damon as Elena is looking for Jonathan's journal. Jeremy shows up and tells them that he gave the journal to Alaric (Matt Davis).

In 1864, Damon is with Katherine when Emily (Bianca Lawson) gets into the room and announces to Katherine that Pearl (Kelly Hu) is here to see her. Katherine meets Pearl, who tells her that she worries with the fact that she is with both Salvatore brothers and them knowing their vampire secret. She gives Katherine an elixir made of vervain and informs her that people start to drink it because they suspect about the vampires. Pearl wants to move to another town but Katherine's not ready. While they are talking, Pearl's daughter passes by and it's revealed that it is none other than Anna.

Stefan and Damon's dad, Giuseppe (James Remar), is a vampire hunter and promises his fellow hunters that both of his boys will help them. He later talks to his sons about their plan and he asks for their help. When their father walks away, Stefan says that if they talk to him about Katherine, they will convince him not to kill her. Damon does not believe that and he makes Stefan promise that he will not tell a thing.

Stefan, despite his promise, tries to talk to his father denying though that he knows any vampires, but his father figures out that he is lying and spikes his drink with vervain. Later, Stefan is with Katherine who tries to feed on him but because of the vervain, she faints. Giuseppe gets into the room and asks Stefan to call the sheriff. Stefan tries to change his dad's mind but he cannot. They take Katherine away to burn her with the other vampires.

Back in the present day, Alaric reads Jonathan's journal at school, while Anna is watching him. Alaric hears something and calls to see if anyone is there. When he does not get any response, he goes to his locker and gets a gun that shoots wooden stakes. He returns to the classroom and finds Stefan there. He shoots him, but Stefan catches the stake before it hits him. Alaric tries to reload but Stefan stops him and gets the gun.

Stefan asks Alaric to sit so they can talk and promises he will not hurt him and he gives Alaric his gun back. Alaric is confused but he trusts him and he tells him why he is in Mystic Falls. He admits that he witnessed a vampire, Damon, killing his wife but Damon had to hear him and he disappeared along with his wife's body. Stefan tells him that if he is here for revenge it will not end good for him and he offers to help him. He asks where the journal is and Alaric points the desk where he left it but the journal is not there anymore.

Anna got the journal and now she reads it to find where the Grimoire is while Ben leaves for his date with Bonnie. Later, Ben tries to fish info from Bonnie about Elena and unsuspected Bonnie tells him that the two of them are like sisters and that she would die for her. Bonnie, decides to give it a chance and she kisses Ben. The moment she does, though, she senses evil and pulls back. She acts as nothing happened and tells him that she needs to go to the bathroom. Ben realizes that Bonnie is suspecting him so he follows her to the bathroom and kidnaps her.

In the meantime, Damon is at Elena's house cooking and talking with Jenna (Sara Canning) while Stefan is with Alaric. Elena is surprised to see him there. Jenna leaves them alone and Damon asks Elena straight if he can trust Stefan, something that Elena reassures him that he can. The night continues with Damon and Jeremy playing video games and Jeremy telling him about Anna. Stefan arrives, also surprised to see Damon there, and tells them what happened and that someone else took the journal. In the question who else knew about it, Damon interrogates Jeremy who admits that Anna also showed interest in it. Damon leaves with Jeremy to find Anna. Anna arrives and Damon sees her from afar, recognizing her as Pearl's daughter.

While Damon is off to track Anna, Stefan tells Elena that he has a copy of the journal from Alaric. They start reading it and Elena finds a mention of Stefan's father in it. They cannot find though any mention of where the Grimoire might be and Stefan remembers a conversation he had with his father and realizes where the Grimoire is; buried with his father. The two of them go to Giuseppe's tomb and start digging it up.

Damon follows Anna at the Grill's restroom and attacks her but she fights him back and they both give up. Anna tells him she was wondering how long it would take him to find her and they go to her motel to talk. She tells Damon that the key to open the tomb is hidden in his dad's journal and asks for his help. Damon takes the journal for himself and walks away telling her that he works alone.

Elena and Stefan find the Grimoire but Damon shows up. Damon looks hurt but also mad over their betrayal, especially Elena's who promised him that he could trust Stefan and he believed her. Damon asks for the journal otherwise he will kill Elena. Stefan knows that he would never do that but then, unexpectedly, Damon grabs Elena and forces her to drink his blood. He would not kill her but he could turn her into a vampire without hesitation. Stefan knows that he would do that and gives him the journal while he walks away with a terrified Elena.

Damon gets the journal and flashes back to the night he lost Katherine. He tried to stop his father but his father tells him that anyone who sides with the vampires will also get killed. Stefan finds Damon and promises to help him save Katherine but Damon is so mad at him and he accuses him that it is his fault.

At the last flashback, we see that Pearl in her attempt to run away runs into Jonathan Gilbert whose watchpoints to her indicating she is a vampire. Pearl is shot and captured while her daughter Anna is watching with Emily. Emily promises Anna she will see her mother again. Stefan also sees Emily with Anna hiding but he does not say a word to the hunters.

Back at the Gilbert house, Elena asks Stefan to bring her an aspirin and he goes downstairs to ask Jenna for one. Jenna tells him that Jeremy's friend Anna is in the house. Stefan, in a quick flashback to the night when Katherine was captured, he remembers Pearl's daughter and realizes who is Anna. He runs upstairs to Elena's room but Elena is gone.

== Feature music ==
In "Children of the Damned" we can hear the songs:

- "Stellar" by Experimental Aircraft
- "Goodbye" by Elefant
- "Floating Vibes" by Surfer Blood
- "When You're Ready" by Kate Earl

== Reception ==
=== Ratings ===
In its original American broadcast, "Children of the Damned" was watched by 3.99 million; up by 0.28 from the previous episode.

=== Reviews ===
"Children of the Damned" received positive reviews by critics.

Matt Richenthal from TV Fanatic rated the episode with 5/5 saying that it was one of the most dense episodes of the season. "It was a sexy, engrossing, suspenseful, educational hour of television." Richenthal also praises Dobrev's acting as Katherine: "How great is Nina Dobrev as Katherine?!? The actress made us forget about Elena during the opening scene. Whether Dobrev has been consulting with Ian Somerhalder for tips on how to act evil is unclear, but this much is not: she relished taking on such a new, different role."

Popsugar of Buzzsugar gave a good review to the episode saying: "We might have been prepared for The Vampire Diaries flashback episode "Children of the Damned" with this sneak peek a while back, but watching this week's episode filled in a lot of blanks. I love the jump from the modern-day mystery to the 1800s ancestral stories, but even more, I love how layered the story is." Popsugar also praised Dobrev's acting as Katherine starting that she enjoyed seeing her.

Licia of Heroine TV also gave a good review to the episode stating that the flashbacks didn't disappoint. "The flashbacks were illuminating, and left me wanting more. For every question that was answered, more questions were uncovered for the viewers to ponder. I love a show that fosters theories, and this has definitely become one."

Josie Kafka from Doux Reviews rated the episode with 3.5/4 stating that the episode was wonderful while Robin Franson Pruter from Forced Viewing rated the episode with 3/4 saying: "A good, flashback-heavy episode examines the concepts of trust and betrayal."

Zeba of Two Cents TV gave a good review to the episode commenting: "Who knew things could get any juicier or plot-twistier on the Vampire Diaries? This week, not only are there major happenings going on in Damon’s quest to release Katherine from her underground tomb (as well as Stefan and Elena’s secret quest to stop him), we get more awesome flashbacks about how everything came to pass – and it looks like it’s all Stefan’s fault."
