= Isobel (The Vampire Diaries) =

- The Vampire Diaries episode
- Episode no.: Season 1 Episode 21
- Directed by: J. Miller Tobin
- Written by: Caroline Dries; Brian Young
- Cinematography by: Paul M. Sommers
- Editing by: Lance Anderson
- Production code: 2J5020
- Original air date: May 6, 2010

Guest appearances
- Mia Kirshner as Isobel Flemming; Malese Jow as Anna; David Anders as John Gilbert

Episode chronology
| ← Previous "Blood Brothers" | Next → "Founder's Day" |
- The Vampire Diaries season 1

"Isobel" is the twenty-first episode of the first season of the American supernatural teen drama television series The Vampire Diaries. It aired on The CW on May 6, 2010. The episode was written by producer Caroline Dries and staff writer Brian Young, and directed by J. Miller Tobin.

== Plot ==
Isobel (Mia Kirshner) and Alaric (Matt Davis) talk at the Grill. Alaric asks Isobel why she left him to become a vampire and she says that is what she always wanted. Isobel wants to meet Elena (Nina Dobrev) and asks Alaric to arrange a meeting for her but he refuses to do it and leaves. Isobel follows him and attacks him at the parking lot. She threatens to kill all his students if he will not do what she asked and leaves.

At Mystic High, Alaric sets Matt (Zach Roerig) and Tyler (Michael Trevino) to work together and help to build the Founder's Day float before he sees Elena and Stefan (Paul Wesley) from afar and leaves. The two friends still do not talk to each other after Tyler made out with Matt's mother, Kelly, even though Tyler tries to apologize. Meanwhile, Caroline (Candice Accola) asks Bonnie (Kat Graham) what is going on between her and Elena but Bonnie does not want to say.

Alaric gets Elena and Stefan at his classroom to talk to them about Isobel's request. Damon (Ian Somerhalder) joins them a little bit later since Alaric called him. Damon is surprised hearing that Isobel is in town and wonders if she is working with John (David Anders) and why she wants the Gilbert device. When they tell him that the only thing she wants is to meet Elena, Damon tells Elena that she does not have to meet her if she does not want to, but Elena agrees and meets her later at the Grill.

Elena and Isobel meet at the Grill while Stefan sits a few tables away for protection. Isobel is surprised by how much Elena looks like Katherine and says that Katherine found her after she became a vampire. Elena wants to know who her father is, but Isobel has no intentions of telling her. Instead, she reveals the real reason she wanted to meet Elena, which is no other than for the Gilbert device, the same one that John wants. Elena asks how she knows John, and Isobel admits that John was in love with her in the past and that he was the one who told her about vampires. Elena refuses to help her with the device and Isobel threatens her that she has to do it. She leaves and Bonnie enters the Grill. She sees Elena upset but she turns around when she sees Stefan approaching her.

At the Gilbert house, Jeremy (Steven McQueen) keeps calling and leaving messages to Anna (Malese Jow) from whom he did not hear since she went home and found her mother dead, something that Jeremy does not know. John hears Jeremy leaving the message and talking to Jenna (Sara Canning) about it and he tells him that if he wants to talk about girls he is there. Jeremy is surprised by the offer and he just leaves.

Isobel comes back home and finds Damon waiting for her. The two of them have a talk and Isobel tells Damon that it is Katherine who wants the device, and Damon warns her to stay away from the people he cares about. Before he leaves, he delivers a message for Katherine; that if she wants the device then she should come and take it herself.

Bonnie shows up at Elena's house feeling bad for not talking to her at the Grill while she saw how upset she was and she apologizes. Elena tells her that she met her birth mother. Elena tells her about the device and later, Bonnie asks her to come and she shows Elena Emily's spell book. Bonnie explains that Emily was the one responsible for all of Jonathan Gilbert's inventions since she was casting spells on them to make him believe that they were working. From the book they learn that the device is a weapon against the vampires and that it consists of two parts; Damon only has one part of it.

Back outside at the schoolyard, Isobel shows up in front of Elena saying that she wants to be involved in her life. Elena refuses her "offer" and Isobel points out that she knows every one of Elena's friends; Bonnie, Caroline, Matt and her little brother Jeremy. To show her that she can hurt them without second thought, she has one of her compelled friends jump on the float Matt's working on, pinning his arm underneath. Tyler and Stefan run to help Matt, while Isobel's other compelled friend kidnaps Jeremy. She promises Elena to kill him if she will not bring her the device.

Elena, Stefan and Bonnie try to figure out how to get the device from Damon who does not want to hand it over, especially now that he knows what it does. Bonnie convinces them that she can remove the spell Emily put on it and that way, Isobel or anyone else won't be able to use it to kill vampires. Damon has his doubts but he eventually gives in and hands the device over to Elena. Bonnie works on the device and few moments later she says that she has removed the spell.

John arrives at Isobel's place and sees that Isobel kidnapped Jeremy. He tries to convince her to let him go but she orders her two friends to attack him. She removes the ring that protects him and leaves on the floor bleeding. Jeremy and John are alone and Jeremy asks what Isobel wants. John explains that there is a group of vampires who are out there and want revenge, and he and Isobel want to kill them.

Elena meets Isobel in the town square. Elena came with Damon and Stefan while Isobel came with her two friends for back-up. Elena does not want to hand over the device until she knows Jeremy is fine. Isobel tells her to call home and she does. Jeremy answers the phone and says that everything is fine. Elena believes that Isobel was never going to hurt Jeremy, but Isobel tells her that she was sure Elena would get the device from Damon, because Damon is in love with her. She hands over the device and Isobel leaves, warning her that as long as she has the Salvatores in her life she is doomed.

Back at home, Elena tries to talk to Jeremy and make up with him but Jeremy still worries about Anna. He admits to Elena that he knows what Anna is and everything else because he read her journal. He is mad at Elena for letting Damon erase his memory and while Elena tries to apologize, Jeremy will not listen and shuts the door in her face. After Elena leaves, Anna shows up crying and tells him that her mother is dead and she had nowhere else to go.

Isobel finds Alaric to say goodbye before she goes. Alaric wonders why she bothered since she did not do it the first time. The two of them have an intense conversation where Alaric removes his ring that protects him and throws the vervain he has on the floor daring her to either kill him or compel him. Isobel compels him to stop looking for her, she puts his ring back on his finger and leaves.

At the Salvatore house, Stefan tries to talk to Damon about what Isobel said; him being in love with Elena. Damon doesn't deny the accusation but Stefan makes it clear that Elena is not Katherine and history will not repeat itself. Damon, changes the subject and tells Stefan that Elena's birth father is John. Stefan asks if he has any proof for that, but Damon says that he does not need one since he put everything together and it is clear that it is John.

Isobel calls John to tell him that she left the device at his doorstep along with his ring. He promises to do what Katherine wants and he will kill all the tomb vampires. Isobel asks him to kill Damon and Stefan as well because she does not want their daughter (revealing that John is Elena's father) to have this life. John reassures her that he will take care of it.

The episode ends with Bonnie talking to Caroline. She admits that she lied to Elena that she would do something but she did not and she knows that when Elena finds out, she will never forgive her.

== Feature music ==
In "Isobel" we can hear the songs:

- "Giving Up the Gun" by Vampire Weekend
- "All The Same To Me" by Anya Marina
- "Our War" by Neon Trees
- "Sing" by Sounds Under Radio
- "Ain't No Rest for the Wicked" by Cage The Elephant
- "We Share the Same Skies" by The Cribs
- "Laredo" by Band of Horses

== Reception ==
=== Ratings ===
In its original American broadcast, "Isobel" was watched by 3.31 million; slightly down from the previous episode by 0.08.

=== Reviews ===
"Isobel" received positive reviews.

Matt Richenthal of TV Fanatic rated the episode with 4.1/5. "On "Isobel," The Vampire Diaries took a breath. It wasn't as fast-paced as many other episodes, but it moved the necessary pieces into place for next week's season finale and it dropped a bomb on us: John Gilbert is Elena's father!" Richenthal closes his review saying: "Looking ahead to the May 13 finale, we hope John doesn't go through with his plan to kill Stefan and Damon, that's for sure. But if this somehow happened, we could understand why. That's an impressive feat for the show to pull off."

Josie Kafka from Doux Reviews rated the episode with 3/4. "This episode began with conflicts, and ended with even more. Bonnie’s ploy, Founder’s Day, Stefan’s anger at Damon’s love for Elena, Elena’s parentage, whether or not John will figure out that Anna is a vampire: so many of these conflicts center on knowledge that some people have and others don’t."

Robin Franson Pruter of Forced Viewing rated the episode with 4/4. "This episode shows the skill with which the series is structured. It works as a self-contained episode, focusing on Isobel’s visit to town. It also works as a set-up to the season finale that will follow. Both the external and emotional conflicts of the season are positioned to come to a climax."

Popsugar from Buzzsugar gave a good review to the episode saying that it was an amazing, climactic one. "With an episode titled as modestly as "Isobel," I was expecting some reveals about Elena's birth mother, but I wasn't expecting the onslaught of revelations that this week had to offer."

Meg of Two Cents TV gave a good review to the episode saying that the reunion of mother and daughter included more death threats and face slaps than hugs and flowers. " This was a great episode – the first one where I’ve seen any depth to Uncle J’s character. Mia Kirshner could not have been more perfectly cast."

Jen Yamato from HitFix praised Kirshner for her portrayal as Isobel saying that she is possibly the most amazing guest performance in the entire series thus far. "The woman should win an award for general bad-assery from this episode alone. Because as much as she convinces you to love to hate her for much of "Isobel," Kirshner pulls out some revelatory material in the ep's final moments that instantly makes her one of this show's most intriguing and compelling characters."
