= Bloodlines (The Vampire Diaries) =

- The Vampire Diaries episode
- Episode no.: Season 1 Episode 11
- Directed by: David Barrett
- Story by: Sean Reycraft
- Teleplay by: Kevin Williamson; Julie Plec
- Cinematography by: Paul M. Sommers
- Editing by: Shawn Paper
- Production code: 2J5010
- Original air date: January 21, 2010

Guest appearances
- Matt Davis as Alaric Saltzman; Mia Kirshner as Isobel Flemming; Malese Jow as Anna; Gina Torres as Bree; Brandon Quinn as Lee; Jasmine Guy as Sheila Bennett

Episode chronology
← Previous "The Turning Point"	Next → "Unpleasantville"
- The Vampire Diaries season 1

"Bloodlines" is the eleventh episode of the first season of the American supernatural teen drama television series The Vampire Diaries. It aired on The CW on January 21, 2010. The episode's teleplay was by written by series developers Kevin Williamson and Julie Plec based on a story by producer Sean Reycraft, while David Barrett served as director.

== Plot ==
Elena (Nina Dobrev) is trapped in her car while a mysterious figure approaches. She screams and suddenly the stranger runs away as Damon (Ian Somerhalder) appears and gets her free. Damon asks her if she is fine. Elena says: "I look like her" and faints. Damon picks her up and goes to his car.

Alaric (Matt Davis) stares at a picture of his wife Isobel (Mia Kirshner) as he remembers moments he lived with her. He knows that there is evil in Mystic Falls and that he was right to come here. He later meets Jeremy (Steven R. McQueen) at the school's parking lot. Jeremy informs him that he found a journal from the 1800s, something that he seems to be interested in.

Elena wakes up in Damon's car wandering what happened and where they are. Damon takes her with him to Georgia and despite Elena's demands to take her back to Mystic Falls he declines and pulls over. Elena's phone rings, Damon answers it and it is Stefan (Paul Wesley) who worries about her especially since she does not have her vervain necklace anymore. Elena does not want to talk to him and Damon hangs up on him. He promises Elena he will not compel her and she agrees to continue traveling with him.

Stefan finds Bonnie (Kat Graham) and asks her to help him find Elena. He gives her Elena's necklace to make a spell but when she tries nothing happens. She leaves and goes to her grandmother (Jasmine Guy) to ask her why she does not have her powers anymore. Her grandmother tells her that she has to face what scared her, so Bonnie leaves and goes to the Fell's Church where Emily destroyed the crystal.

Damon and Elena arrive at a bar where Damon is old friends with the owner, Bree (Gina Torres). Bree is a witch and Damon came to ask her help so he can bring Katherine back. They all have fun and drink and at one moment Elena goes outside to call Jenna (Sara Canning) and inform her that she is fine and that she slept at Bonnie's. Inside the bar, Damon finally tells Bree what he wants and she tells him that he needs the crystal to open the tomb. Damon does not have the crystal and wants to know if they can use a different spell but to do that, the witch has to be blood related to Emily.

Jeremy is at the school's library looking for information about his paper when he meets Anna (Malese Jow). The two of them start talking and Anna helps him find more information. She also tells him that she also has an old journal and she believes that the stories about vampires are real after the stories her grandfather told her. Jeremy does not believe in vampires and tries to convince her that those stories are just fiction.

Stefan calls Elena who is still angry and demands to know how she is connected to Katherine. Stefan tells her that he does not know while Damon overhears the conversation and appears next to Elena when she hangs up the phone. Bree takes the opportunity of Damon being outside and calls someone to let them know that Damon is there.

Bonnie gets to the Fell's Church but while she is looking around, she falls into a hole in the ground, inside the tomb. At the same time, Stefan goes to Bonnie's grandmother's house and asks for her. Grams Sheila senses that he is a vampire after touching his hand and knowing that she can trust him, she tells him that he knows where to find Bonnie. Stefan goes to Fell's Church, finds Bonnie and gets her out of the tomb. While being in the tomb, Bonnie was hearing noises coming behind a door with a pentagram drawn on it, something that tells Stefan about. He assures her that while the vampires are still barely alive, they are weak and desiccated and locked away safely. Stefan brings Bonnie back home and safe and Sheila thanks him. The two of them seem to know each other from some years ago.

Back at the bar, a mysterious figure walks in and exchanges a look with Bree. Elena walks outside once again to answer her phone, when a man grabs her and drags her away. Damon notices her absence and goes out to look for her. He sees Elena but when he tries to help her, the man beats him with a baseball bat and starts dousing him with gasoline. Elena tries to save Damon's life while the man (Brandon Quinn) tells her that Damon killed his girlfriend, Lexi. Elena manages to convince him not to kill Damon and the man runs away.

Damon, before he travels back to Mystic Falls, confronts Bree and he is pissed because she betrayed him and set him up. Bree explains that she did it because Lexi was her friend and warns him that her blood is full of vervain but she is still scared of him. In an attempt to save her life, she tells him that Emily's spell book holds the secret to reverse the spell. He apologizes and then rips her heart out.

Elena and Damon are back to Mystic Falls and Elena finally talks to Stefan asking him the truth and if he was with her because of her resemblance to Katherine. Stefan explains that she is nothing like Katherine and he noticed that before they even met. He reveals to her that he was there the night she had the accident with her parents and that he was the one who saved her. He tried to save her parents as well but it was too late. Since then he began watching her to be sure that she was not Katherine and he figured out how different she was from her.

Elena is shocked but she keeps wondering why the two of them look so much alike and if they are related. Stefan explains that he was wondering the same thing and that her last name (Gilbert) confused him because Katherine's was different (Pierce). He then discovered that Elena is adopted but he did not want to start asking people about Katherine's family because it was dangerous. Elena gets back home and is mad at Jenna for never telling her she was adopted. Jenna is shocked and tries to explain that she promised not to tell but Elena does not want to hear her.

The episode ends with Alaric sitting at the bar. He remembers the night his wife died, when he got into the room and saw a vampire drinking from her. He recognizes that vampire to the one who is sitting few feet away from him; Damon.

== Featured music ==
"Bloodlines" features the songs:

- "Nothing Is Logical" by The Bell
- "Out of the Blue" by Julian Casablancas
- "Only One" by Alex Band
- "Look Inside" by The Dig
- "The Night Before" by The Stereotypes
- "Pepper Spray" by The Upsidedown
- "Push" by The Steps
- "Trouble" by Hope Sandoval & the Warm Inventions
- "Can't Stop These Tears (From Falling)" by The Black Hollies
- "Between the Devil and the Deep Blue Sea" by Black Mustang
- "On a Mission" by The Dandelions
- "An End Has a Start" by Editors
- "Cosmic Love" by Florence and the Machine

== Reception ==
=== Ratings ===
In its original American broadcast, "Bloodlines" was watched by 3.68 million, up by 0.11 from the previous episode.

=== Reviews ===
"Bloodlines" received positive reviews by critics.

Popsugar of Buzzsugar gave a good review to the episode, saying that it has amazing storylines. "The story picks up where its mid-season cliffhanger left off — with Elena injured in a car crash and a creepy creature coming for her. But there were also amazing storylines picked up for not just Elena, but Bonnie, Jeremy, and Alaric as well. [...] And once again, for as many little threads that were sewn up, there were as many brand-new threads of the story that I can't wait to explore."

Matt Richenthal of TV Fanatic gave a good review to the episode and praised Somerhalder's acting, saying: "As always, it's a testament to Ian Somerhalder's performance that he can be so charming and attractive one moment, only to remind viewers at every turn of his evil side. We audibly gasped when he killed Bree. Somehow, even now, we still didn't see that coming!"

Josie Kafka from Doux Reviews rated the episode with 3/4, saying: "I sort of kept my eye on the clock as this episode went by: each scene was about a minute and a half long. No wonder this show is so intense. Something new is happening every 90 seconds."

Robin Franson Pruter of Forced Viewing rated the episode with 3/4, even though she was not impressed by it, stating: "What saved the episode and pushed it over from a negative 2-star to a positive 3-star review are the interactions between Somerhalder, Dobrev, and Torres and the four big revelations at the end of the episode."

Lauren Attaway from Star Pulse gave a B− grade to the episode.
