= There Goes the Neighborhood (The Vampire Diaries) =

- The Vampire Diaries episode
- Episode no.: Season 1 Episode 16
- Directed by: Kevin Bray
- Written by: Bryan Oh; Andrew Chambliss
- Cinematography by: Paul M. Sommers
- Editing by: Joshua Butler
- Production code: 2J5015
- Original air date: April 1, 2010

Guest appearances
- Malese Jow as Anna; Kelly Hu as Pearl; Sterling Sulieman as Harper; Stephen Martines as Frederick; Melinda Clarke as Kelly Donovan

Episode chronology
| ← Previous "A Few Good Men" | Next → "Let the Right One In" |
- The Vampire Diaries season 1

"There Goes the Neighborhood" is the sixteenth episode of the first season of the American supernatural teen drama television series The Vampire Diaries. It aired on The CW on April 1, 2010. The episode was written by co-producer Bryan Oh and executive story editor Andrew Chambliss, and directed by Kevin Bray.

== Plot ==
The episode starts with the vampires who got out of the tomb trying to adjust to the modern way of living at the house in the woods where they are gathered by Pearl (Kelly Hu) and Anna (Malese Jow). Pearl and Anna have to leave to go into town and leave Frederick (Stephen Martines) in charge. Frederick though wants to leave the house and not stay any longer locked in. Pearl enforces order and then she leaves with Anna. Frederick though sneaks out of the house with another vampire named Bethanne (Jeni Perillo) a little later.

Stefan (Paul Wesley) and Elena (Nina Dobrev) talk about having fun for only one day without any vampires. Caroline (Candice Accola) approaches them and asks them to go out on a double date the four of them; Elena, Stefan, Caroline and Matt (Zach Roerig). Elena hesitates to accept but Stefan convinces her that it will be fun.

Damon (Ian Somerhalder) comes home and finds Pearl and Anna wait for him. He tries to choke Pearl but she is older and stronger than him. Pearl tells him that the trapped vampires escaped from the tomb and that she needs his help. Damon denies even though Pearl promises she will find Katherine for him and Pearl hurts him telling him that she is not asking.

Matt suggests his mother Kelly (Melinda Clarke) to try get a job as bartender at the Grill and she agrees to give it a try. She goes to the bar but she is stood up for the interview when Damon comes and sits next to her. A little later Jenna (Sara Canning) gets into the bar and the three of them start drinking together having fun.

Jeremy (Steven R. McQueen) searches in the Internet information about vampires when the doorbell rings and it is Anna. Jeremy looks surprised since he thinks that Anna left with her mother. The two of them talk and Jeremy opens a subject about vampires saying that maybe they do exist and some of them might be misunderstood. Anna looks upset and tries to throw him off.

The four of the double date get at the Grill and start playing pool. They spot Jenna, Kelly and Damon at the bar drinking and Matt and Elena start talking about old stories and them being knowing each other since kids, something that makes Caroline feel awkward. She leaves for the restroom asking Elena to go with her. Caroline lets Elena know that she does not like what is happening and Elena apologizes.

Elena, on her way back to the pool, is seen by Frederick who is at the Grill and grabs her calling her Katherine. Elena says that he is mistaken and goes to Stefan. She writes Stefan a text message to let him know but when Stefan tries to spot the man, is already gone. The four of them leave and go to the Salvatore house to continue their double date. Matt sees Stefan's miniature car collection and gets excited, so Stefan shows him his sport car and let him take it for a ride with Caroline.

Meanwhile, a drunk Jenna exits the Grill to go home as Damon and Kelly flirt. She runs into Frederick who tries to compel her but it does not work. He asks about Damon, who he saw her with in the bar, and Jenna tells him where he lives before she leaves. Back at the Salvatore house, the four teenagers get back inside to find Kelly and Damon making out. Kelly walks out ashamed and Matt goes with her while Damon does not look bothered. Elena offers to drive Caroline home while Frederick spies the Salvatore house from afar.

At the Gilbert house, Jeremy and Anna make sandwiches while Jeremy cuts his hand in purpose since he is suspecting Anna to be a vampire. Anna cannot resist and reveals to Jeremy that she is a vampire by drinking from him. Jenna returns home right on time to make Anna stop. Jeremy greets Jenna and by the time he searches for Anna, she is gone. Pearl catches Anna return home late and demands to know where she was. Anna does not tell her about Jeremy but that she was just out for a walk.

Stefan tries to lecture Damon when Frederick and Bethanne jump through the window and attack Stefan. Damon pulls Frederick off Stefan and all four of them start struggling. Stefan kills Bethanne and Frederick flees when he sees he has lost his partner. Stefan is shocked because he recognizes them as vampires who were sealed in the tomb while Damon is less surprised since he already knew that the spell did not work. Frederick returns to Pearl's without Bethanne and he admits she was right and they should not leave the house. She lets him back in but teaches him a lesson by stabbing him in the gut with a wooden spoon.

The episode ends with Jeremy finding Anna at his room upset asking him why he did what he did and that she could kill him. Jeremy says that he put all the signs together in hope that it is true that vampires exist, so it would be true for Vicky (Kayla Ewell) as well. Jeremy tells Anna that he wants her to turn him.

== Feature music ==
In "There Goes the Neighborhood" we can hear the songs:

- "The Mess I Made" by Parachute
- "Lovesick Mistake" by Erin McCarley
- "Crash/Land" by In-Flight Safety
- "Perfect Day" by The Constellations
- "Cross My Heart" by Marianas Trench
- "The Ocean" by Tegan and Sara
- "In-Flight Safety" by CloudHead
- "Better Than This" by Keane

== Reception ==
=== Ratings ===
In its original American broadcast, "There Goes the Neighborhood" was watched by 2.80 million; down by 0.53 from the previous episode.

=== Reviews ===
"There Goes the Neighborhood" received positive reviews.

Steve Marsi from TV Fanatic rated the episode with 3.9/5. "The result was surprising and led to a solid, albeit unspectacular episode, save for a great twist at the end."

Josie Kafka of Doux Reviews rated the episode with 3/4 saying that it was a transition episode and it did its job.

Robin Franson Pruter of Forced Viewing rated the episode with 3/4. "An episode lacking major plot developments lays the groundwork for the final group of episodes of the first season. [...] What works in this episode and makes this review (marginally) positive is the solid execution of what is there and a few nice touches that bring a smile to the viewer’s face [...] Ultimately, this episode serves to lay the groundwork for the next episode, which brings the Frederick story arc to a close, and for the remaining episodes of the season."

Popsuger of Buzzsugar gave a good review to the episode saying: "Things definitely picked up steam, with some sauciness thrown in with a lot of goriness. Still, it was a fantastic installment."

Lucia from Heroine TV gave a good review to the episode. "So, all in all, it was a pretty good episode, that included a few really great moments. If nothing else, this episode will always be remembered as the one in which Pearl poked out Damon’s eyes. And the one in which Stefan and Matt began their beautiful friendship."
