= Under Control (The Vampire Diaries) =

- The Vampire Diaries episode
- Episode no.: Season 1 Episode 18
- Directed by: David Von Ancken
- Written by: Barbie Kligman; Andrew Chambliss
- Cinematography by: Paul M. Sommers
- Editing by: Lance Anderson
- Production code: 2J5017
- Original air date: April 15, 2010

Guest appearances
- Marguerite MacIntyre as Liz Forbes; David Anders as John Gilbert; Melinda Clarke as Kelly Donovan

Episode chronology
← Previous "Let the Right One In"	Next → "Miss Mystic Falls"
- The Vampire Diaries season 1

"Under Control" is the eighteenth episode of the first season of the American supernatural teen drama television series The Vampire Diaries. It aired on The CW on April 15, 2010. The episode was written by co-executive producer Barbie Kligman and executive story editor Andrew Chambliss, and directed by David Von Ancken.

== Plot ==
Stefan (Paul Wesley) tries to detox himself from human blood by working out and staying away from other people. Damon (Ian Somerhalder) does not find the idea really good and he tempts him with a glass of blood before he drinks it himself. Stefan has his reasons for not wanting to drink human blood.

At the Gilbert house, uncle John (David Anders) shows up for a visit; he doesn't know how long it will be. Jenna (Sara Canning) is not really happy to see him. John does not state all of the reasons why he came back, but one of them is to prevent Jenna from selling his brother's office to Pearl (Kelly Hu).

At school, Matt (Zach Roerig) thanks Elena (Nina Dobrev) for being there for him while Jeremy (Steven R. McQueen) and Tyler (Michael Trevino) talk about Vicky. Jeremy is not convinced that Vicky's death was due to overdose as was stated on the coroner's report, and he later asks the Sheriff (Marguerite MacIntyre) if they have any news about Vicky since somebody must have buried her.

The founders' council calls a meeting in which Damon is now a member. Elena's uncle John is also there and a member and warns the council that there were many break-ins at a blood bank not far away from Mystic Falls, meaning that the vampire problem is not over yet.

Alaric (Matt Davis) talks to Elena about Jeremy's last history paper that was based on vampires. He says that Jeremy made it clear it was not real but maybe she should talk to him. Elena asks Stefan about it and Stefan suggests that she should ask him and also talk to him about her being adopted. They start making out but Stefan cannot control his desire for blood and he throws himself off of Elena. Elena really worries about him and she calls Damon to ask how Stefan is dealing with the whole thing and how long it will take for him to be himself again.

Elena decides to tell Jeremy about her adoption, something that Jeremy takes really well. While they are talking, she brings up Jeremy's paper about vampires and Jeremy says that it is just another thing in a long list of the crazy Gilbert men, convincing Elena that he doesn't know the truth about vampires.

Everyone is gathered at the Founder's Day 150th Anniversary party. Stefan struggles to control his hunger and starts drinking. Elena notices that he is drunk and worries even more about him after an aggressive behavior to one of the attendants of the party while Damon is amused seeing him having fun. Damon is more concerned about Jeremy who is asking around more about Vicky's suspicious death. He wants to compel him but Elena tells him not to do it and that she will handle it herself.

Tyler runs into Kelly (Melinda Clarke) and the two of them go outside and, both being a little drunk, start making out. Matt gets out and attacks Tyler. The two of them start fighting and Kelly gets injured after they push her away. Alaric goes outside and breaks them up, seeing something strange in Tyler's face.

In the meantime, John introduces himself to Damon and the two of them have a talk about the history of Mystic Fall's vampire problem since 1864. John seems to know more than Damon thinks since he knows about the vampires that were locked in the tomb and that Damon was the one who opened it few days ago. Damon realizes that John knows he is a vampire and he kills him.

Elena tries to talk to Jeremy and convince him to move on from Vicky. From their conversation, Jeremy suspects that Elena knows something and she hides it from him. He leaves the party and goes home where he starts searching for her journal. He finds it and starts reading.

Back at the party, Stefan smells blood while heading out of the house. He searches around and finds Kelly, who got injured during Tyler and Matt's fight. Stefan goes to her and while she is talking to him, he wipes the blood with his fingers and when Kelly asks him what is he doing, he runs outside to collect himself but his hunger takes over and he licks the blood from his fingers.

Inside, Damon enjoys the party again but he is shocked seeing John across the room alive and well. Mayor Lockwood (Robert Pralgo) invites John to ring the charter bell in honor of the 150th Anniversary. Damon heads to Alaric and whispers to him that John has the same ring as his and wonders if Isobel was also involved with John since she was the one who gave the ring to Alaric.

Damon and Alaric follow John outside while he is heading home to ask him about the ring. John reveals that he knows much more about them and everyone in Mystic Falls than everyone suspects and he will tell everyone if anything happens to him. He says that the ring is a family heirloom and that his brother also had one. He gave one of them to Isobel and Isobel gave it to Alaric. John also tells Damon that he was the one who sent Isobel to him and that he knows about Katherine before he takes off, leaving the two men stunned looking at each other.

Elena comes back home where Jeremy acts like he did not just read her journal. She goes to her room and finds Stefan who came to apologize to her for his earlier behavior. He finally admits to her that he cannot control himself and wants to stay away from her so he will not hurt her, but Elena tells him that she is not scared and she will be there for him.

Stefan returns home to find Damon drinking blood from a glass and really worried after John's revelations. Before Damon tells him anything, he realizes how much Stefan is struggling and he leaves the room, leaving the glass of blood on the table. Stefan takes the glass and drinks the blood.

== Feature music ==
In "Under Control" we can hear the songs:

- "Does This Mean You’re Moving On?" by The Airborne Toxic Event
- "Brick by Boring Brick" by Paramore
- "Use Your Love" by Katy Perry
- "White Night" by The Postelles
- "Yeah!" by The Golden Dogs
- "1901" by Phoenix
- "You And I" by Black Mustang
- "Hey Hey Girl" by The Virgins
- "To Be Your Loss" by The Morning After Girls

== Reception ==
=== Ratings ===
In its original American broadcast, "Under Control" was watched by 3.15 million; down by 0.38 from the previous episode.

=== Reviews ===
"Under Control" received positive reviews.

Matt Richenthal of TV Fanatic rated the episode with 4.5/5 saying that it was another stellar installment of the show. "While the episode wasn't packed with action, it was chock full of character development and questions, most of them surrounding Stefan's new state and a new member of the Founder's Council: Uncle John Gilbert."

Josie Kafka from Doux Reviews rated the episode with 3.5/4. "I really liked Elena and Jeremy finally talking about her being adopted, and both of them deciding in about 5 seconds that it didn’t matter for their relationship."

Robin Franson Pruter of Forced Viewing rated the episode with 3/4. "Strong storytelling characterizes this episode as the first season plot threads begin to come together in anticipation of the season finale."

Popsugar of Buzzsugar gave a good review to the episode saying that as a whole, it was a fantastic episode. "I could tell something was up with John Gilbert, but I didn't think he would be so mysterious — or so psychotic. Is he merely a human with a special ring, or is there something more to him?"

Tiffany Vogt from The TV Watchtower gave a good review to the episode, praising the casting of Anders as John Gilbert: "Casting the subtly devilish David Anders to play Uncle John Gilbert was brilliant. [...] Uncle John seemed so benign upon first introduction. Yet within minutes he was peeling back the mask of congenial affection and showing that he was a force to be reckoned with."
