= Fool Me Once (The Vampire Diaries) =

- The Vampire Diaries episode
- Episode no.: Season 1 Episode 14
- Directed by: Marcos Siega
- Written by: Brett Conrad
- Cinematography by: Paul M. Sommers
- Editing by: Shawn Paper
- Production code: 2J5013
- Original air date: February 11, 2010

Guest appearances
- Malese Jow as Anna; Kelly Hu as Pearl; Sterling Sulieman as Harper; Sean Faris as Ben McKittrick; Jasmine Guy as Sheila Bennett

Episode chronology
← Previous "Children of the Damned"	Next → "A Few Good Men"
- The Vampire Diaries season 1

"Fool Me Once" is the fourteenth episode of the first season of the American supernatural teen drama television series The Vampire Diaries. It aired on The CW on February 11, 2010. The episode was written by Brett Conrad and directed by consulting producer Marcos Siega.

== Plot ==
Elena (Nina Dobrev) wakes up and finds herself in a strange hotel room. She sees Ben (Sean Faris) sleeping and tries to slowly sneak out but Ben wakes up. Anna (Malese Jow) arrives and drags Elena to the bathroom locking her in. Elena finds Bonnie (Kat Graham) lying unconscious in the bathtub. She tries to help Bonnie and Elena informs her that Ben is with Anna and they want to open the tomb but they need a witch to do that.

Meanwhile, Stefan (Paul Wesley) looks everywhere for Elena all over Mystic Falls but he cannot find her. He goes to Damon (Ian Somerhalder) asking for his help but Damon, who is still mad at him, does not want to help. Damon leaves Stefan alone and goes to Bonnie's grandmother, Sheila (Jasmine Guy), asking for Bonnie but Sheila knows really well who he is and tells him to go away.

Back at the hotel room, Anna explains to Elena that she wants to get into the tomb to free her mother Pearl (Kelly Hu) who's trapped in there. Anna calls Stefan and asks him to bring her the Grimoire otherwise she will kill Elena. Stefan does not have it but promises he can get it and they arrange to meet Damon at a public place.

While Anna goes to meet Damon, she runs into Jeremy (Steven R. McQueen) who invites her to a party. Anna tries to avoid him at the beginning but she changes her mind when she hears where the party will be — near the old cemetery. She takes off to meet Damon. Damon insists that he works alone but when Anna threatens to kill Elena, the two of them come to an agreement.

In the meantime, Stefan appears at the motel room and helps Elena and Bonnie. As they run out of the room, Stefan warns Ben to leave town otherwise, if he sees him again he will kill him. Anna comes back and finds Ben hiding behind the bed to avoid the sunlight. Ben tells her that Stefan came and he couldn't do anything. Anna realizes that she lost the witch but she knows that Damon will open the tomb no matter what and she has to be there when that happens.

Bonnie, Elena and Stefan are at Sheila's house talking and Elena thinks they do not have choice but to help Damon get Katherine back. Sheila agrees to open the tomb as long as the rest of the vampires are burned. Elena has to earn Damon's trust back and leaves to go and find him and talk to him. She finds him at the Salvatore house and she convinces him to trust her again. Stefan, Bonnie and Sheila wait for Damon and Elena at the church ruins. Stefan brought along arsonist tools. Damon, who brought an IV bag of blood for Katherine, and Elena arrive and Sheila and Bonnie start the process to break the spell and open the tomb. Stefan runs outside to get his arsonist tools.

Meanwhile, Jeremy gets to the party and looks around for Anna. Anna shows up and the two of them go for a walk away from the crowd. Anna tells him that she is leaving town with her mom and Jeremy kisses her. Anna's face begins to show that she is a vampire and Jeremy asks her what is going on when Ben appears and knocks him out. Anna tells Ben to drag Jeremy close to the tomb so they can use him for Pearl to feed on when they get her out.

Stefan runs into Ben while he is getting his tools. Anna also appears and tells him that she will take her mother out and gives Stefan a choice. He can try to stop her or save Jeremy from Ben. Stefan leaves Anna and goes and stays alone with Ben who tries to attack him believing he is stronger. Stefan uses the arsonist tool and burns him.

Meanwhile, Bonnie and Sheila keep chanting the spell and the tomb's door cracks open. Damon, to be sure that Sheila won't seal him into the tomb, grabs Elena and takes her with him. Inside the tomb, Elena hears whispering and asks what is happening. Damon informs her that they can sense her but he runs off to find Katherine leaving Elena alone. Elena searches for him while she stumbles over the desiccated bodies of the vampires and freaks out.

Anna arrives at the tomb finding the door open. Bonnie wants to stop her but Sheila does not let her, so Anna goes into the tomb. Bonnie wants to know why her Grams let her in and Sheila says that no vampire will come out of the tomb. They managed to open the door but not break the seal spell so a vampire can go in but not come out. Stefan comes back and wants to run into the tomb when he hears Damon took Elena with him but Sheila stops him, explaining to him why.

Inside the tomb, Anna finds Elena and explains to her how Stefan and Jonathan Gilbert are responsible for her mother's imprisonment and why she decided that it would be Gilbert family's blood that will bring her mother back to life. She bites Elena who starts screaming making Stefan run into the tomb to find her. Anna feeds Elena's blood to Pearl but Stefan gets there in time before Pearl kills her. Elena runs away to get out of the tomb.

Bonnie wants to help Stefan get out and she begs Sheila to lift the seal just for a while so Stefan can escape. Elena escapes and Bonnie tells her about the seal. Stefan gets to the door but cannot step outside and Elena realizes that he went in only to save her even though he knew. She also remembers the promise they gave Damon and Stefan goes back inside to find his brother. Bonnie and Sheila cast a spell to lift the seal and Anna comes out with her mother.

Damon is still in the tomb but he cannot find Katherine anywhere. Stefan comes to him and realizes that Katherine is not in the tomb, never was. Damon is frustrated and throws the IV bag of blood against the wall breaking it. Stefan urges him to hurry so they can get out before the seal closes again. Elena runs in to beg them to leave. The three of them get out just in time before the door closes again.

Bonnie and Sheila go back home while Sheila looks exhausted over the energy she spent for the spell and goes to lie down. Elena and Stefan rush to find Jeremy who is waking up and he is fine. Damon is shocked for not finding Katherine and Elena hugs him telling him she is sorry. Elena takes Jeremy home who says he cannot remember anything but when Elena leaves to go to Bonnie, Jeremy starts searching on the Internet about vampires.

Anna brings her mother to the motel room where they find Damon waiting for them. Damon grabs Pearl threatening to kill her and accuses Anna of knowing the whole time that Katherine was not in the tomb. Anna admits that she did know but she did not tell him because then he would never have helped her open the tomb. Pearl explains to him how Katherine got away and Anna tells him that she saw Katherine a few years ago. Katherine knew where Damon was but she did not care to find him. Damon is heart broken over the information and leaves.

Bonnie goes to check on her Grams but she finds her dead. She starts yelling for help while she desperately goes through the spell book to find a spell that will bring her back and Elena calls 911.

Back at the tomb, a vampire manages to get to the blood bag Damon threw against the wall and he feeds on its contents. He gets up, slowly gets to the door sliding it open and exits the tomb revealing that the seal spell did not work.

== Feature music ==
In "Fool me Once" we can hear the songs:

- "Run" by Leona Lewis
- "All You Do Is Talk" by Black Rebel Motorcycle Club
- "Out Tonight" by The Steps
- "Every Summer" by U.S. Royalty
- "In a Cave" by Tokyo Police Club
- "Answer To Yourself" by The Soft Pack
- "Before It Gets Better" by Earlimart
- "Can't Fight It" by Oh Mercy

== Reception ==
=== Ratings ===
In its original American broadcast, "Fool me Once" was watched by 3.51 million; down by 0.48 from the previous episode.

=== Reviews ===
"Fool me Once" received positive reviews.

Matt Richenthal of TV Fanatic rated the episode with 4.3/5. "But it seems as though producers were aware of this potential for a plot device, which is why "Fool Me Once" was yet another example of why The Vampire Diaries is an exciting, well-paced show that delivers answers and surprises every week." Richenthal also praised the writers of how they portray Damon and Somerhalder for his ability to play him: "Ian Somerhalder has had a blast playing this manipulative, fun-loving character. But he's clearly capable of a layered depth, as well. While so many other shows struggle with how to turn an evil character into a sympathetic figure, The Vampire Diaries has slowly given us more and more on Damon, making him into a tragic villain. Could you really blame Elena for giving him a hug at the end?"

Josie Kafka from Doux Reviews rated the episode with 4/4. "There were two great tragedies this week: Grams’s death and Katherine’s absence. Now that Grams is dead, our heroes are lacking a guiding moral compass who knows the dark side and how to avoid going over to it; Katherine’s absence…well, we’ll see how that plays out."

Robin Franson Pruter from Forced Viewing rated the episode with 4/4. "Excellent episode features complex plot and emotionally powerful events. [...] This episode had the potential to be a huge failure. [...] The expectations for the return of Katherine, the vampire who turned the Salvatore brothers into vampires and turned them against each other, were high. So, in the face of all that build-up, the opening of the tomb to reveal that Katherine was never in there in the first place could have been a debacle on the level of Geraldo Rivera and Al Capone’s safe. But it wasn’t. The show managed to create the sense that the shock of her not being there outweighed the disappointment of that fact." Franson Pruter also praised Somerhalder for the way he portrayed a heart-wrenching Damon.

Popsugar of Buzzsugar gave a good review to the episode saying that she is pretty satisfied and commenting that Elena and Damon had some amazing scenes together. "The show is as intense as we've come to expect from the freshman series, and I think it's a fitting way to end things for a bit."

Kath Skerry of Give Me My Remote gave a good review to the episode saying: "If we’re going to have to wait over a month until we head back to Mystic Falls, at least we were left with one hell of an episode. Although I missed some of Damon’s trademark sass, "Fool Me Once" had me completely captivated (and a bit spooked). Talk about gut wrenching."

Meg from Two Cents TV also gave a good review to the episode. "What a night it was! For the last new episode before its month-long hiatus, The Vampire Diaries certainly delivered a plot-packed hour with lots of twisty goodness."

Lucia from Heroine TV stated that "it was another stellar hour of television that left me wanting for more."

== Notes ==
- This is the first episode that Matt Davis, who portrays Alaric Saltzman, is credited as part of the main cast and not as a guest. Despite that, he didn't appear on the episode.
