= Unpleasantville =

- The Vampire Diaries episode
- Episode no.: Season 1 Episode 12
- Directed by: Liz Friedlander
- Written by: Barbie Kligman; Brian Young
- Cinematography by: Paul M. Sommers
- Editing by: Lance Anderson
- Production code: 2J5011
- Original air date: January 28, 2010

Guest appearances
- Matt Davis as Alaric Saltzman; Malese Jow as Anna; Dillon Casey as Noah; Sean Faris as Ben McKittrick

Episode chronology
← Previous "Bloodlines"	Next → "Children of the Damned"
- The Vampire Diaries season 1

"Unpleasantville" is the twelfth episode of the first season of the American supernatural teen drama television series The Vampire Diaries. It aired on The CW on January 28, 2010. The episode was written by co-executive producer Barbie Kligman and staff writer Brian Young, and directed by Liz Friedlander.

== Plot ==
Stefan (Paul Wesley) gives Elena (Nina Dobrev) jewelries filled with vervain that he made for her, family and friends to protect them. At the same time, the doorbell rings, Jeremy (Steven R. McQueen) opens the door and a delivery guy (Dillon Casey) is at the door. He invites him in and calls Elena to pay him. As the delivery guy walks away, he pulls his hoodie back on revealing that he is the vampire Elena hit with her car.

Damon (Ian Somerhalder) looks for their dad's journal when Stefan gets in and tries to find out why Damon wanted to go to Atlanta. He asks him what Bree told him but Damon will not tell. Stefan later gives him their dad's journal trying once again to find out what Damon's after. He tells him that he'll help him to free Katherine but Damon declines his offer.

Jeremy gets an A for his history paper while Alaric (Matt Davis) tries to see if Jeremy believes in the stories about vampires. He then asks if he could read the source Jeremy used, the journal, and Jeremy gives it to him.

Elena gives Caroline (Candice Accola) a necklace with vervain and asks about her relationship with Matt (Zach Roerig). Caroline feels awkward and tells her that they are just friends but Elena reassures her that she is fine if she wants to date him. Meanwhile, Matt gets a job at the Grill as a busboy and Damon approaches Bonnie trying to make amends since he is gonna need her for his plan. Bonnie warns him to stay away from her and the bartender Ben (Sean Faris) comes to help her get rid of Damon.

Meanwhile, Elena gets a phone call from a stranger. Elena realizes who he is (the guy she hit with her car) and when she spots him across the street she drives away. She informs Stefan about the phone call and Stefan gives her the Gilbert watch explaining her how it works.

Anna (Malese Jow) finds Jeremy at the Grill and he thanks her for her help regarding his history paper. Anna keeps talking about vampires but Jeremy still does not believe in the stories and tries to get away. Anna tries to ask him out but Jeremy leaves for the school dance. She later goes to the school dance herself and finds him, asking him for Jonathan's journal. Jeremy says that he lent it to Alaric, something that makes Anna upset and her face change (Anna is a vampire). Jeremy notices but she tells him it is nothing and she walks away.

At the Gilbert house, Elena faces Jenna (Sara Canning) and asks the truth about her adoption. Jenna tells her that her parents helped a pregnant teenage girl to give birth but she then disappeared. Her parents were trying for a long time to have a baby and they decided to keep her as their own. Her father made all the necessary paper work and when Elena asks if she knows anything more about her birth mother, Jenna says only her name; Isobel.

While Elena is getting ready for the dance, the watch is activated meaning that a vampire is close. Elena freaks out and calls Stefan immediately. Damon answers letting her know that Stefan is on his way but he forgot his cell. Elena calms down thinking that the watch was activated because of Stefan but she gets attacked by Noah. Stefan gets there in time and saves her with Noah running away.

Damon joins Stefan and Elena trying to find out what Noah wanted. Damon suggests to use Elena as a bait at the dance to find him before he comes back at the house. Elena agrees and they all leave for the dance. Elena catches up with Bonnie and Caroline and then the two girls leave the dance because they are not having fun and go to the Grill.

At the Grill, Bonnie decides to take the first step and approaches Ben asking him out. Caroline tries to do the same with Matt but he is upset with her regarding something she said to Bonnie earlier and he overheard it. Caroline apologizes but Matt tells her that he does not know if he got over Elena yet and that is why he does not want to ruin what the two of them have at the moment, their friendship. Caroline says he already did and leaves. Matt changes his mind and follows her with his car. He stops her and he finally kisses her.

Back at the dance, Elena and Stefan keep dancing while Alaric approaches Damon and introduces himself. He starts asking questions until Damon gets suspicious and Alaric backs off. In the meantime, Noah got into the dance and Anna spies him. They seem to know each other while she warns him to stay away from Elena since she is not Katherine and the Salvatores are with her. Noah does not hear her and continues his hunt for Elena. Anna tells him that she did not get the journal yet but she knows where it is.

Elena finally spots Noah and tells Stefan who goes after him but Stefan is following the wrong guy since Noah gave his hoodie to a teenage boy. He realizes that he was tricked to leave Elena alone and runs back to her. Meanwhile, Noah calls Elena and asks her to exit through the side door, otherwise he will kill Jeremy, so Elena follows his instructions. She tries to run away but Noah catches up to her in the cafeteria. The two of them struggle and the moment he is about to bite her, Stefan and Damon arrive.

Noah tries to escape but Stefan stakes him in the gut to make him suffer but not kill him, while he starts asking him what he wants. Noah explains that he is after Elena because he looks like Katherine and Damon and Stefan are surprised to know they were not the only ones Katherine played with. They do not remember Noah but he remembers them and he also gives them information that they need the "Grimoire" to get into the tomb. They can find more info in Jonathan Gilbert's journal. They ask him who he is working with but he will not tell, so Stefan kills him.

Anna watches the whole scene between the brothers and Noah but she hides as she hears Alaric approaching. Alaric sees the moment Stefan kills Noah and he walks away like he knows nothing. Damon follows him and compels him to tell him what he knows. Alaric, even compelled, lies to him and Damon walks away. It is revealed that Alaric, who is stunned after the confrontation, was holding vervain in his hand.

Damon and Stefan discuss what happened and suspect that Noah is not alone. Stefan tells Damon that he knows he is looking for Emily's journal (which is the Grimiore Noah was talking about) to reverse the spell and he repeats his offer to help him free Katherine as long as he is there and the other vampires will stay behind. Damon trusts him and accepts his offer. Stefan tells Elena about his promise to Damon later at home but he informs her that his promise was a lie.

Meanwhile, Alaric walks Jenna home and asks her out for a date which Jenna accepts. While they are talking, Alaric mentions his wife's name was Isobel and that she was from not far away from Mystic Falls. Jenna looks at him in shock, realizing that his wife is Elena's birth mother.

The episode ends with Anna stalking Ben while he is closing the Grill and walks home. She attacks him but he fights back revealing that he is also a vampire. The supposed to be fight turns into a play and it is revealed that Ben also works with Anna and Noah and his job is to get close to Bonnie. Anna and Ben kiss before they walk away together.

== Feature music ==
In "Unpleasantville" we can hear the songs:

- "Mr. Sandman" by Oranger
- "Now That We've Grown" by St Leonards
- "My Boyfriend's Back" by The Raveonettes
- "Great Balls of Fire" by Misfits
- "Slow Dance" by Jocko Marcellino
- "Everybody" by AutoVaughn
- "Runaway" by Misfits
- "Keep It Cool" by U.S. Royalty
- "Dreams Are For The Lucky" by Jeff Scott
- "Everyday" by Rogue Wave
- "This Magic Moment" by Misfits
- "Pacer" by Systems Officer
- "There's This There's That" by We Barbarians

== Reception ==
=== Ratings ===
In its original American broadcast, "Unpleasantville" was watched by 3.71 million; slightly up by 0.03 from the previous episode.

=== Reviews ===
"Unpleasantville" received positive reviews by critics.

Matt Richenthal of TV Fanatic rated the episode with 4.5/5 saying that it was another outstanding episode that leaves people anxious about what's to come. "There are many reasons why we love The Vampire Diaries: a hot cast, intriguing characters, suspenseful storylines. But above all, perhaps, is this: the show actually provides answers. It doesn't drag out mysteries with no end in sight. Every week, viewers are treated to valuable nuggets of information, while, of course, dropping their jaws over new questions and plot developments. That's also why we love The Vampire Diaries. This week's episode, "Unpleasantville," was the perfect example of an hour that shocked fans with what we learned about both old issues and new characters."

Popsugar from Buzzsugar gave a good review saying that it was another fantastic, layered episode. "The Vampire Diaries hit us with its second episode since it came back from Winter hiatus, and I'm just as impressed with "Unpleasantville" as I was with last week's "Bloodlines.""

Lucia of Heroine TV said that the episode was a treat for her and she is glad that Caroline, finally, has a vervain necklace to protect her from Damon's plays. "Honestly, if nothing else happened in this episode besides Caroline getting her vervain necklace, I would have been satisfied. Thankfully, however, the writers weren’t stingy with the awesomeness."

Robin Franson Pruter from Forced Viewing rated the episode with 3/4 stating that it was a solid, yet unremarkable episode. "Overall, “Unpleasantville” isn’t a stand-out episode. The series has found its groove now, and “Unpleasantville” presents an example of an average episode, typified by solid story development and character interaction."

Josie Kafka from Doux Reviews gave a good review to the episode rating it with 3/4 and Lauren Attaway from Star Pulse gave a B+ rate to the episode.
