= Marguerite MacIntyre =

American actress, writer and producer

- Occupations: Actress, writer
- Years active: 1994–present

Marguerite MacIntyre is an American actress, writer and producer. She is known for her role as Nicole Trager in Kyle XY, Elizabeth Forbes in The Vampire Diaries (2009–2017) and as Miss Rhode Island in the 1994 Seinfeld episode "The Chaperone".

== Biography ==
She has also appeared in Broadway or Off-Broadway productions of Jane Eyre, City of Angels, No Way to Treat a Lady, Annie Warbucks, Weird Romance, and Mata Hari.

She starred on The Vampire Diaries as Sheriff Forbes until season six and Kyle XY as Nicole Trager. For The Vampire Diaries spin-off show The Originals, she is credited as a staff writer, story editor and for the final season as writer and supervising producer. She has lived in Nashville, Tennessee since the early-2010s

== Filmography ==
=== Television ===
Year	Title	Role	Notes
1994	Seinfeld	Karen	Episode: "The Chaperone"
1994	The Commish	Elaine MacGruder	Episode: "The Lady Vanishes"
1997–1998	The Tom Show	Darla	3 episodes
1998	You Wish	Jessica	Episode: "All in the Family Room"
1998	The Secret Lives of Men	Laura	Episode: "Phil's Problem"
1998	To Have & to Hold	Karen Flood	Episode: "Hope You Had the Time of Your Wife"
1998–1999	Two Guys and a Girl	Kaitlin Rush	3 episodes
1999	The Pretender	Deborah Clark	Episode: "Murder 101"
1999	Veronica's Closet	Lily	Episode: "Veronica's Little Tribute"
1999	Odd Man Out	Barbara Wickwire	Episode: "Fight Club"
2000	Pacific Blue	Mrs. Lamb	Episode: "Fifty-Nine Minutes"
2000	Ally McBeal	Deborah Schofield	Episode: "Prime Suspect"
2001	Law & Order: Special Victims Unit	Darlene Sutton	Episode: "Folly"
2002	Strong Medicine	Tori Davis	Episode: "Deterioration"
2003	The Shield	Emma Prince	4 episodes
2003	The Practice	Jake Spooner's Defender	Episode: "Victims' Rights"
2004	NCIS	Commander Lauren Tyler	Episode: "Eye Spy"
2004	Judging Amy	Nala Cooper	Episode: "My Little Runaway"
2004	The Days	Abby Day	6 episodes
2005	Medical Investigation	Dr. Karen Lowe	Episode: "Spiked"
2005	Numbers	Erica Kalen	Episode: "Judgment Call"
2005	Inconceivable	Sonya Vanucci	Episode: "To Surrogate, with Love"
2005	Bones	Dr. Denise Randall	Episode: "The Man in the Bear"
2006	Shark	Vivian Anderson	Episode: "In the Grasp"
2006–2009	Kyle XY	Nicole Trager	Main role
2008	CSI: NY	Annie McBride	Episode: "Dead Inside"
2009	CSI: Miami	Deborah Emerson	Episode: "Collateral Damage"
2009	The Mentalist	Heather Prentiss	Episode: "Scarlett Fever"
2009–2017	The Vampire Diaries	Sheriff Liz Forbes	Recurring role (seasons 1–6), guest (season 8); 50 episodes

=== Film ===
Year	Title	Role	Notes
1994	Radioland Murders	Bubble Bath Announcer	
2002	Red Dragon	Valerie Leeds	
2013	April Apocalypse	Muriel	
