= Malese Jow =

American actress (born 1991)

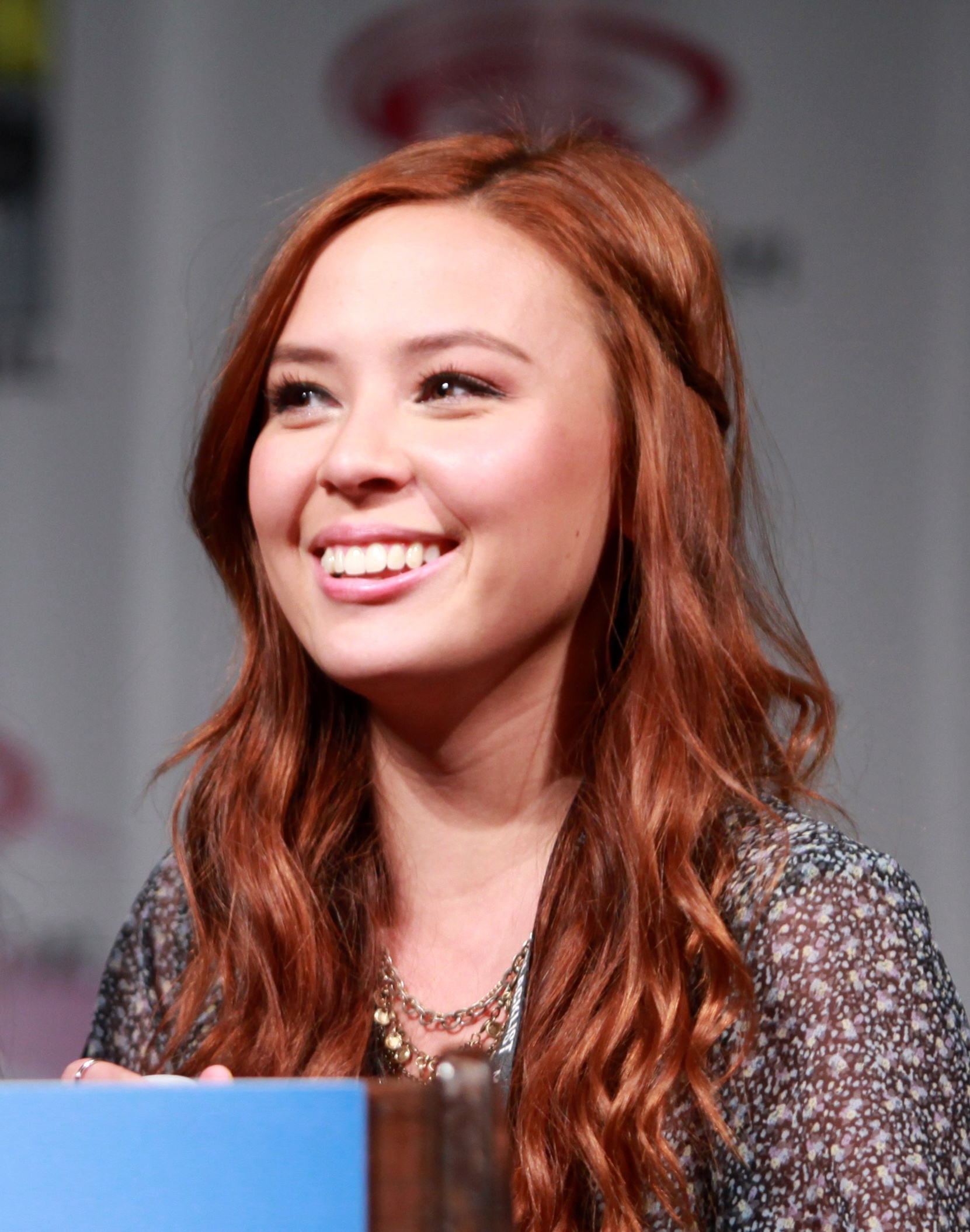
- Jow at the 2014 WonderCon
- Born: Elizabeth Melise Jow; February 18, 1991 (age 35); Tulsa, Oklahoma, U.S.
- Occupations: Actress; singer
- Years active: 1997–present

Elizabeth Melise Jow (born February 18, 1991), known professionally as Malese Jow (and later just Melise), is an American actress and singer. She is known for her roles as Geena Fabiano on the Nickelodeon sitcom Unfabulous, Lucy Stone on the Nickelodeon musical sitcom Big Time Rush and as Anna, a teenage vampire on The CW's fantasy drama The Vampire Diaries. She starred as Julia Yeung in the short-lived CW science fiction romantic drama Star-Crossed. Jow starred as Mareth Ravenlock in season two of The Shannara Chronicles. She voiced Kate Cha / Dupli-Kate in the Amazon Prime Video animated series Invincible.

== Early life ==
Born in Tulsa, Oklahoma, Jow moved to California with her mother Lanae Tillery Jow, sister Makenna Jow, and brothers Jensen and Braden Jow when she was nine years old. Jow is of Chinese and Cherokee descent. As a child, she would often sing the national anthem at local baseball games.

== Career ==
When she was six years old, Jow appeared on Barney & Friends and Dellaventura. She had a co-starring role in the Nickelodeon sitcom Unfabulous as Geena Fabiano, one of the best friends of Emma Roberts' character Addie Singer. The show ran for three seasons from 2004 to 2007 and earned Jow several Young Artist Award nominations.

When Unfabulous ended in 2007, Jow co-starred in the film Bratz: The Movie as Quinn. She has guest-starred on the shows Wizards of Waverly Place, The Young and the Restless, iCarly, The Secret Life of the American Teenager and the Disney Channel series Hannah Montana and co-starred in the 2009 science fiction comedy Aliens in the Attic.

In 2010, Jow appeared in the first season of The CW fantasy drama The Vampire Diaries. She played Anna, a vampire. Jow briefly re-appeared in the third season. That same year, Jow co-starred in the fantasy romance film You're So Cupid! as Megan, and the drama film The Social Network as Alice Cantwell. She also guest-starred on an episode of TNT crime comedy-drama Leverage. Jow went on to star in the Nickelodeon action/science fiction sitcom The Troop as Cadence Nash.

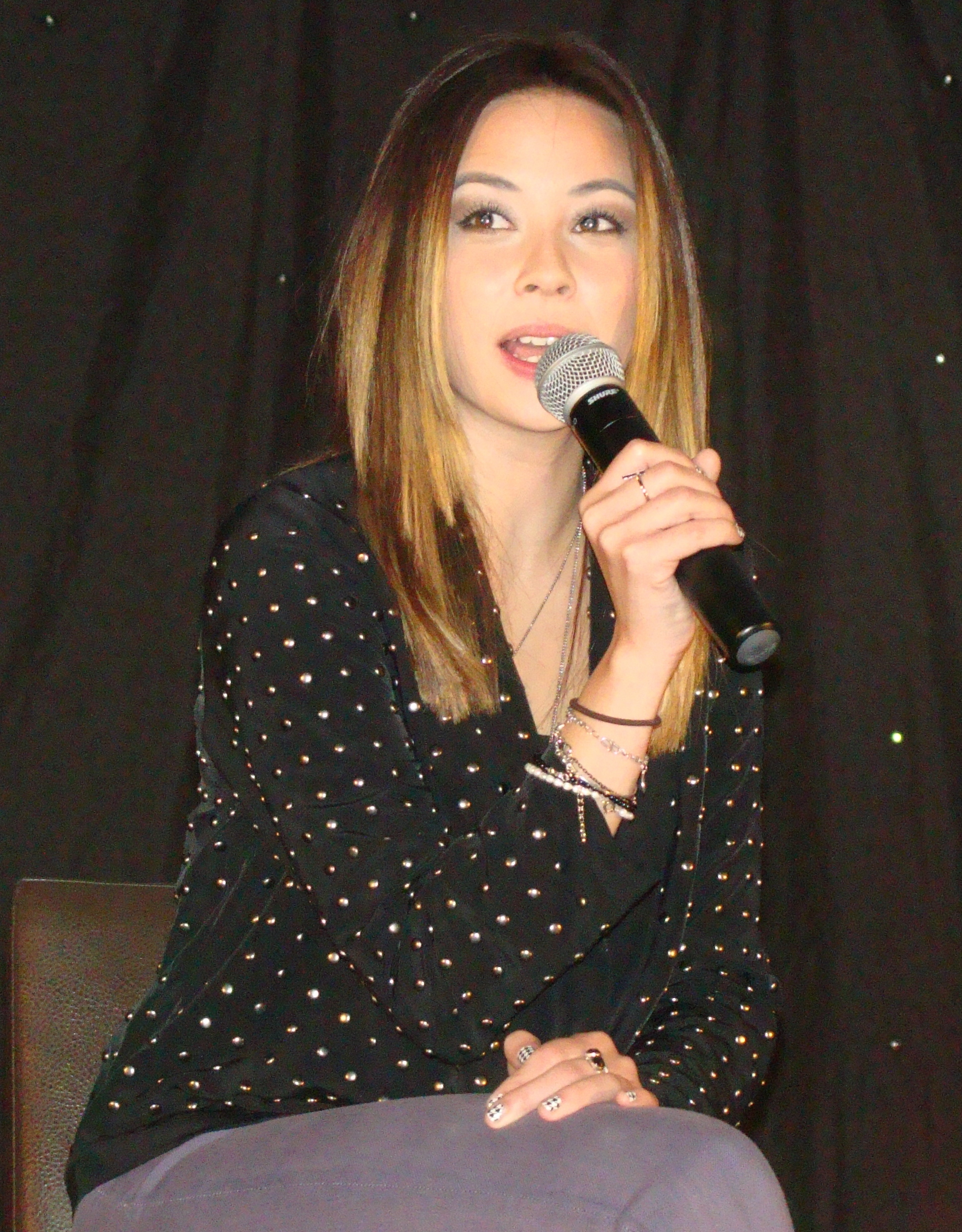
Jow in June 2012

In 2011, Jow began a recurring role in the second season of the Nickelodeon musical sitcom Big Time Rush as Lucy Stone, an aspiring rock musician and a brief love interest of Kendall Knight (Kendall Schmidt) and later on becomes the love interest of James Diamond (James Maslow). She guest-starred in the ABC mystery comedy-drama Desperate Housewives as Violet.

In 2012, Jow starred in The CW drama pilot Shelter, produced by J. J. Abrams and Mark Schwahn, where she played Morgan. It was not picked up by the network.

In January 2013, Jow confirmed her role in the crime comedy Plastic. That same month, it was also announced that Jow would reprise her role as Lucy Stone on Big Time Rush in the fourth and final season.

In February 2013, Jow was revealed to be the new host of The Vampire Diaries side show, TVD Rehash (Re#ash) replacing previous host Arielle Kebbel. Later that month, it was announced that Jow would be joining the CW science fiction romantic drama pilot Oxygen, as Julia Yeung, a girl who has an illness which may be cured by aliens. In May 2013, Oxygen was picked up and retitled Star-Crossed. The series was part of the 2013–14 mid season schedule. In August 2013, production began for Star-Crossed. The show ran for one season from February 17 to May 12, 2014. In 2014, Jow was in the television movie Presumed Dead in Paradise and played Madison Ashland. On October 27, 2014, she was announced to have a recurring role as Linda Park on the CW's superhero drama The Flash. In 2015, Jow was listed in Maxim's Hot 10. On August 25, 2015, Jow was announced to be reprising her role as Linda Park. In the second season's fifth episode, "The Darkness and the Light," Jow played villainess Doctor Light, an alternate universe version of Linda Park. On February 2, 2017, it was announced Jow would be playing Mareth Ravenlock on MTV's The Shannara Chronicles. On NCIS: Los Angeles, she played Jennifer Kim, who is the illegitimate daughter of late NCIS Assistant Director Owen Granger (Miguel Ferrer). In September 2017, it was revealed that Jow would be playing Daya in the upcoming Escape Plan: The Extractors movie. Jow has begun filming a new feature film as of November 2017 titled I Wrote This For You.

Jow has semi-retired from acting as of 2025, choosing voiceover projects such as Invincible. The series, based on the comic book series of the same name, which premiered on Amazon Prime Video in 2021 over on screen work. She also produces content for Instagram involving food.

== Filmography ==
=== Film ===
Year	Title	Role	Notes
2007	Bratz: The Movie	Quinn	
2009	Aliens in the Attic	Julie	
2010	You're So Cupid!	Megan	
2010	The Social Network	Alice Cantwell	
2014	Plastic	Beth	
2018	I Wrote This For You	Ariana	
2019	Escape Plan: The Extractors	Daya Zhang	Direct-to-video film

=== Television ===
Year	Title	Role	Notes
1997	Barney & Friends	Tea party girl	Episode: "Pennies, Nickels, Dimes"
1997	Dellaventura	Orphan child	Episode: "Dreamers"; uncredited
2003	The Brothers Garcia	Reynita	Episode: "Right Place, Right Time"
2004–2007	Unfabulous	Geena Fabiano	Main role
2007	Wizards of Waverly Place	Ruby Donahue	Episode: "Movies"
2008	The Young and the Restless	Hannah	2 episodes
2009	iCarly	Fake Carly Shay	Episode: "iLook Alike"
2009	The Secret Life of the American Teenager	Gail	Episode: "One Night at Band Camp"
2009	Hannah Montana	Rachel	2 episodes
2010–2011	The Vampire Diaries	Annabelle "Anna" Zhu	Recurring role (seasons 1–3), 18 episodes
2010	Leverage	Josie	Episode: "The Boost Job"
2011–2013	The Troop	Cadence Nash	Main role (season 2)
2011	Desperate Housewives	Violet	Episode: "Then I Really Got Scared"
2011–2013	Big Time Rush	Lucy Stone	Recurring role, 14 episodes
2012	CSI: Miami	Amanda Reed	Episode: "Friendly Fire"
2014	Star-Crossed	Julia Yeung	Main role
2014	Castle	Hillary Cooper	Episode: "Smells Like Teen Spirit"
2014	Presumed Dead in Paradise	Madison Ashland	Television film
2015	The Flash	Linda Park / Doctor Light	Recurring role, 7 episodes
2015	Filthy Preppy Teens	Beatrix Bishop	Web series; main role
2015–2019	NCIS: Los Angeles	Jennifer Kim	4 episodes
2016	Sweet/Vicious	Chloe Freeman	Episode: "Tragic Kingdom"
2016	Sisters of the Groom	Sarah Adams	Television film
2017	The Shannara Chronicles	Mareth Ravenlock	Main role (season 2)
2021–present	Invincible	Kate Cha / Dupli-Kate, Iguana, Various	Recurring voice role, 15 episodes

=== Video game ===
Year	Title	Role	Notes
2026	Invincible VS	Kate Cha / Dupli-Kate	

== Discography ==
=== Singles ===
Title	Year	Album
"He Said She Said"	2006	Non-album singles
"Turn Away"	2006	Non-album singles
"Sounds of Summer"	2006	Non-album singles
"Live for Today"	2006	Non-album singles
"You Left Me in the Air"	2007	Non-album singles
"You Had It All"	2007	Non-album singles
"Mista DJ"	2007	Non-album singles
"Hey Oh"	2007	Non-album singles
"Left Waiting"	2007	Non-album singles
"No Better"	2008	Non-album singles
"Caught Up in You"	2008	Non-album singles
"Go Go"	2008	Non-album singles
"Where You Belong" (featuring Joe Jonas)	2008	Non-album singles
"The Perfect Love"	2009	Non-album singles
"Red Light"	2010	Non-album singles
"Bad Romance" (featuring Nick Dellinger)	2010	Non-album singles
"Smells Like Teen Spirit"	2011	Non-album singles
"Dear Lover"	2014	Non-album singles
"Timber Street" (Austin Charles featuring Malese Jow)	2015	Non-album singles
"Fighting for This Love	2016	Non-album singles
"Trying to Sleep"	2018	Non-album singles

=== Music videos ===
Title	Year	Director
"Trying to Sleep"	2018	Melise

As a guest appearance

Year	Title	Artist
2009	"When You're Around"	C&C
2009	"The In Crowd"	Mitchel Musso
2010	"Til I Forget About You"	Big Time Rush
2011	"Famous"	Lissa Lauria
2011	"Time-Bomb"	All Time Low

== Accolades ==
Award	Year	Category	Nominated work	Result
Alliance of Women Film Journalists	2010	Best Ensemble Cast	The Social Network	Nominated
Broadcast Film Critics Association	2010	Best Cast	The Social Network	Nominated
Hollywood Film Festival	2010	Ensemble of the Year	The Social Network	Won
San Diego Film Critics Society	2010	Best Performance by an Ensemble	The Social Network	Nominated
Young Artist Award	2005	Best Young Ensemble Performance in a TV Series (Comedy or Drama)	Unfabulous	Nominated
Young Artist Award	2006	Best Young Ensemble Performance in a TV Series (Comedy or Drama)	Unfabulous	Nominated
Young Artist Award	2007	Best Young Ensemble Performance in a TV Series (Comedy or Drama)	Unfabulous	Nominated
Young Artist Award	2008	Best Young Ensemble Performance in a TV Series (Comedy or Drama)	Unfabulous	Nominated
Young Artist Award	2008	Best Performance in a TV Series – Supporting Young Actress	Unfabulous	Nominated
