= Steven R. McQueen =

American actor

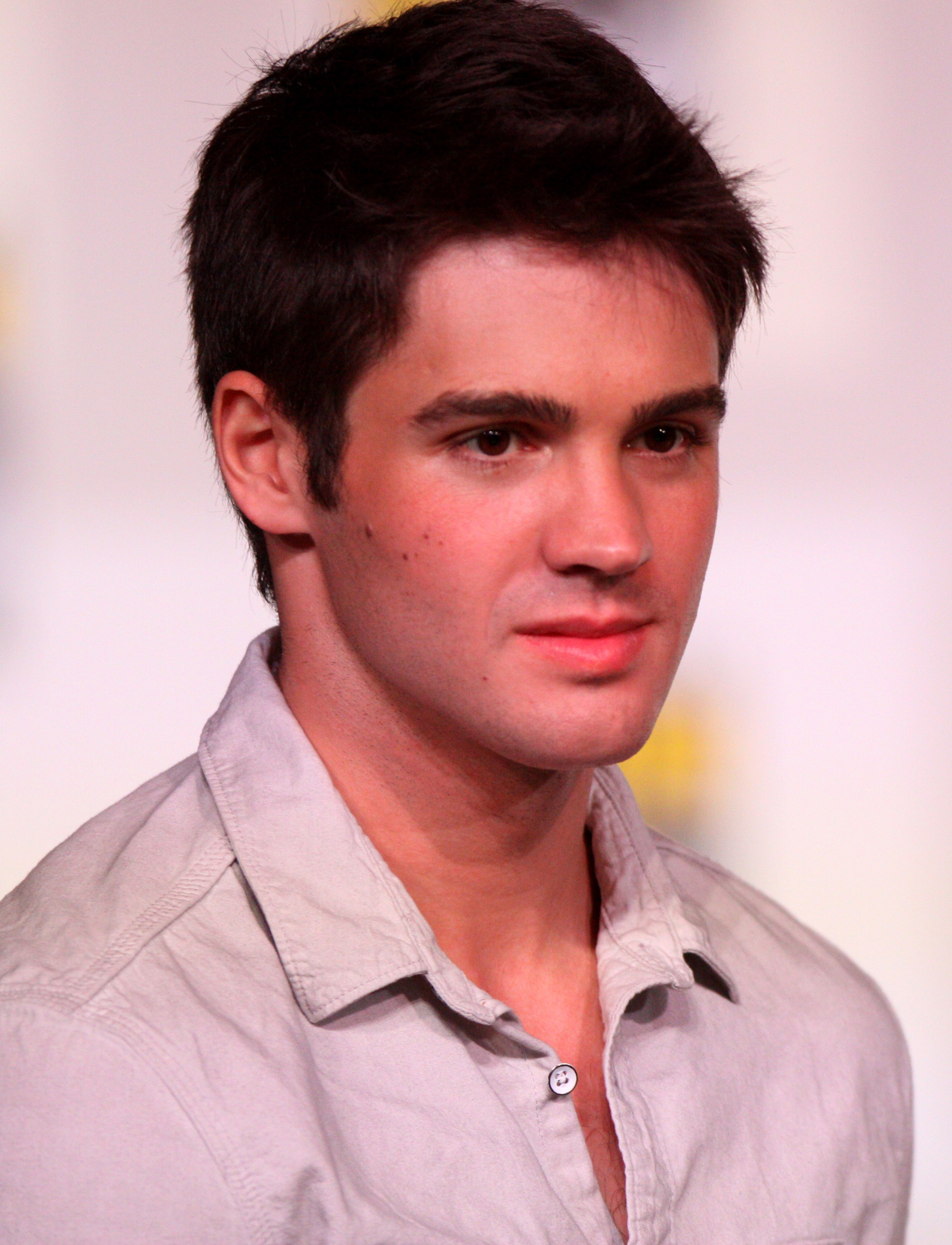
- McQueen at the 2012 San Diego Comic-Con
- Born: Steven Chadwick McQueen; Los Angeles, California, U.S.
- Occupation: Actor
- Years active: 2005–present
- Notable work: The Vampire Diaries; Chicago Fire
- Parent: Chad McQueen (father)
- Relatives: Steve McQueen (paternal grandfather); Luc Robitaille (stepfather); Neile Adams (paternal grandmother); Isabel Preysler (first cousin once removed); Chabeli Iglesias (second cousin); Julio Iglesias Jr. (second cousin); Enrique Iglesias (second cousin); Tamara Falcó (second cousin)

Steven Chadwick McQueen, known professionally as Steven R. McQueen, is an American actor, best known for his role as Jeremy Gilbert in The CW fantasy supernatural drama The Vampire Diaries from 2009 to 2015 and in 2017, and its spin-off Legacies in 2018. He also starred as Jimmy Borrelli in the NBC dramas Chicago Fire from 2015 to 2016 and Chicago P.D. in 2016, part of the One Chicago franchise.

== Early life ==
McQueen was born to Stacey (née Toten), a humanitarian and former actress, and Chad McQueen, a race car driver and former actor. His paternal grandparents are actor Steve McQueen and Filipino actress Neile Adams. His stepfather, Luc Robitaille, is a Hockey Hall of Fame-honored professional ice hockey executive and former player. McQueen is the oldest of four children with a half-brother, Chase, and a half-sister, Madison, from his father's remarriage and a half-brother, Jesse Robitaille, from his mother's remarriage. His stage name is "Steven R. McQueen", the "R" referring to his stepfather's surname Robitaille. McQueen described his relationship with his father and his stepfather in an interview with the New York Post, "My stepdad has been more like a biological dad in my life. I'm pretty close with my biological dad, but I think of him more like an uncle. It's a good relationship."

In his mid-teens, McQueen moved around from city to city with his parents, including living in Detroit and being home-schooled until his graduation. It was while living in Detroit that he started watching movies, including those of his grandfather, "From there, my passion for it slowly unfolded. I went to a couple of classes and I grew to love it." Eventually, he packed his bags, moved back to Los Angeles and started taking acting classes.

== Career ==
=== 2005–2008: The beginning of an acting career ===
McQueen made his television debut in September 2005 at the age of 17, appearing as a guest star in an episode of the short-lived CBS science fiction drama Threshold. He subsequently guest-starred on a number of other CBS television series including Numb3rs, Without a Trace and CSI: Miami. One of the more notable roles since his debut was a recurring role as Kyle Hunter for seven episodes of the fourth and final season of The WB drama Everwood from 2005 to 2006. His character is a teenage piano prodigy and moody loner struggling to navigate his sexuality, the coming out storyline attempting to shine a light on the struggles young people face and to show that they are not alone. Whilst McQueen co-starred in a short film, Club Soda in 2006, it was in January 2008 that he made his feature film debut in the Disney Channel Original Movie Minutemen, where he played the villainous role of Derek Beaugard. In an interview, McQueen was asked if portraying a mean character in the film was challenging and he replied, "You know, it was actually really fun because I'm not really that mean in real life. It's all just pretend and really fun."

=== 2009–2015: The Vampire Diaries, modelling work and his inspiration ===
In 2009, McQueen was cast as Jeremy Gilbert in The CW's television adaptation of L. J. Smith's The Vampire Diaries novels and starred for the first six seasons until 2015. Gilbert was written to have left Mystic Falls for art school when it was announced that the sixth season would be McQueen's last. His performance in the drama earned him a nomination for the Choice TV Male Scene Stealer Award in the 2013 Teen Choice Awards. McQueen made a special appearance in 2017 in the series finale to reprise his role by helping out at the Salvatore Boarding School for the Young and Gifted, and once more in 2018 as a special guest star in his role as Jeremy Gilbert in The Vampire Diaries' spin-off Legacies. Besides being a vampire hunter on-screen, McQueen starred in a loose remake of the 1978 horror film Piranha, titled Piranha 3D in 2010, with an ensemble cast including Elisabeth Shue, Adam Scott, Jerry O'Connell, among others. He played a socially awkward kid who fell in love with a girl two years his senior.

Away from the small screen, McQueen joined fellow actors Christa B. Allen, Colton Haynes and Debby Ryan as a fashion model for the American lifestyle retailer Abercrombie & Fitch in their Spring 2014 "The Making of a Star" advertising campaign. In both the video and print, he explained his inspiration of following his grandfather's footsteps to become an actor, saying, "As a kid growing up in Detroit I longed to be a Superhero. Later on I started watching movies my grandpa (Steve McQueen) did, and I saw what an impact they made on the world. That's when I said, 'Hey, I want to do that too'."

=== 2015–2020: Chicago Fire and other projects ===
Ten years since his acting debut, McQueen joined the cast of the NBC drama Chicago Fire, in the premiere of the fourth season as Jimmy Borrelli in 2015, a new candidate assigned to Firehouse 51. McQueen was credited as a recurring cast member for the first six episodes and was added to the main cast from the seventh episode. In addition, he also guest-starred in the crossover episodes of Chicago P.D. in 2016, as part of the One Chicago franchise created by Dick Wolf. At the beginning of Season 5, Borrelli took matters into his own hands during a fire call and suffered a career-ending injury. McQueen's run on the show ended in the second episode of the fifth season in October 2016.

In 2018, in addition to being a special guest star in The CW's fantasy drama Legacies, McQueen co-starred in a short film, The Take Off, that had its world premiere at the 2018 Santa Barbara International Film Festival. He also starred in a television film for Hallmark Original Movies, Home by Spring, and ended the year off by starring as the U.S. Medal of Honor recipient, awarded posthumously, Joseph Vittori in an episode of Netflix's anthology documentary series Medal of Honor.

In 2020, McQueen starred alongside the lead actor Neal McDonough and co-star Casper Van Dien in a Western television film for INSP, The Warrant. He explained how he got involved in the film, "Neal's been a family friend for a long time so he called me and we had a conversation about it and he said it was gonna be a Western and we'd get to shoot some guns and have a good time..."

== Personal life and philanthropy ==
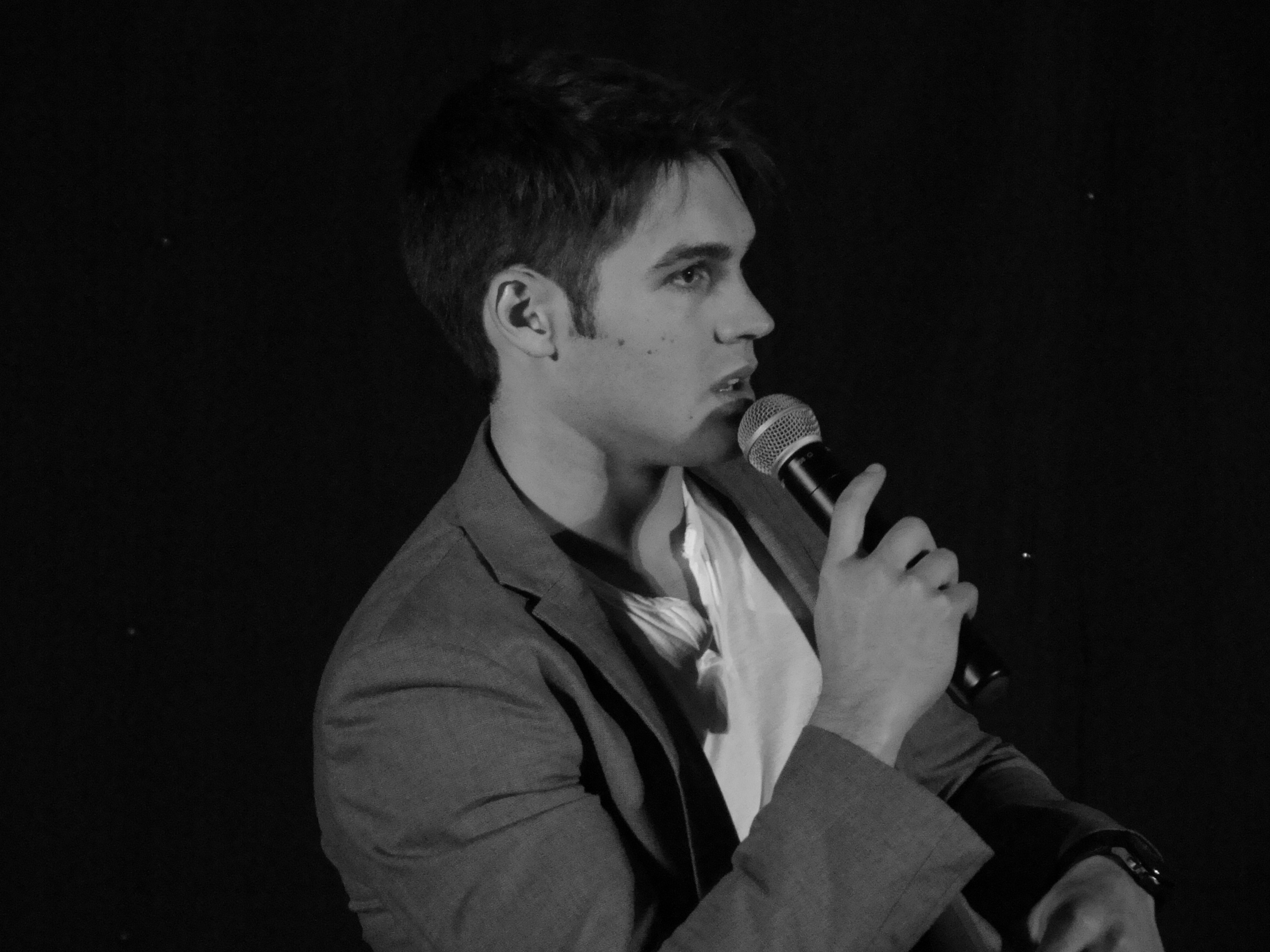
McQueen in 2012

McQueen announced his engagement to model Alexandra Silva on Instagram on January 25, 2018, with a black and white photo and the quote "She said yes", but they called off their engagement in May 2018.

Since 2014, McQueen has been a supporter of the Thirst Project, a nonprofit organization whose aim is to bring safe drinking water to communities around the world where it is not immediately available. He lends his support by attending at their annual fundraising event, the Annual Thirst Gala, as well as travelling to the Kingdom of Eswatini to help to construct water installations. He also supports TECHO and Echoes of Hope, a nonprofit organization founded by his parents Stacia and Luc Robitaille, to help at-risk and emancipated foster youth succeed and reach their full potential.

== Filmography ==
=== Film ===
Year	Title	Role	Notes	Ref.
2006	Club Soda	The Kid	Short film	
2010	Piranha 3D	Jake Forester	—N/a	

=== Television ===
Year	Title	Role	Notes	Ref.
2005	Threshold	Jordan Peters	Episode: "Blood of the Children"	
2005–2006	Everwood	Kyle Hunter	Recurring role; 7 episodes	
2008	Minutemen	Derek Beaugard	Television film for Disney Channel Original Movie	
2008	Numb3rs	Craig Ezra	Episode: "Atomic No. 33"	
2008	Without a Trace	Will Duncan	Episode: "True/False"	
2008	CSI: Miami	Keith Walsh	Episode: "Gone Baby Gone"	
2009–2015, 2017	The Vampire Diaries	Jeremy Gilbert	Main role (season 1–6); special appearance (season 8) episode: "I Was Feeling Epic"	
2015–2016	Chicago Fire	Jimmy Borrelli	Main role (seasons 4–5)	
2016	Chicago P.D.	Jimmy Borrelli	Guest role (season 3)	
2018	Home by Spring	Wayne Hancock	Television film for Hallmark Original Movie	
2018	Legacies	Jeremy Gilbert	Episode: "We're Being Punked, Pedro"	
2018	Medal of Honor	Joseph Vittori	Episode: "Joseph Vittori"	
2020	The Warrant	Cal Breaker	Television film for INSP	

== Awards and nominations ==
Year	Award	Category	Nominated work	Result	Ref.
2006	Beverly Hills Film Festival	Best Male Performance	Club Soda	Won	
2013	Teen Choice Awards	Choice TV: Male Scene Stealer	The Vampire Diaries	Nominated	
