= Carlos Falcó =

Spanish peer (1937–2020)

The Most Excellent Carlos Falcó 5th Marquess of Griñón 12th Marquess of Castel-Moncayo GE
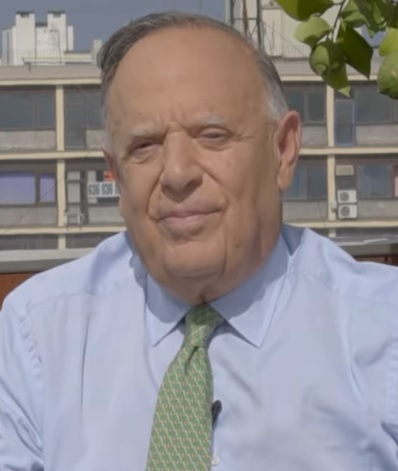
- Pictured in 2018
- Born: 3 February 1937; Seville, Andalusia, Spain
- Died: 20 March 2020 (aged 83); Madrid, Spain
- Spouses: Jeannine Girod (m. 1963; div. 1971) Isabel Preysler (m. 1980; div. 1985) Fátima de la Cierva (m. 1993; div. 2011) Esther Doña (m. 2017)
- Children: 5

Carlos Falcó y Fernández de Córdoba, 5th Marquess of Griñón and 12th Marquess of Castel-Moncayo, GE (3 February 1937 – 20 March 2020) was a Spanish peer, businessman and socialite. He was best known by his title of Marquess of Griñón despite later inheriting a much older title, Marquess of Castel-Moncayo, which has a Grandeeship attached.

== Life and family ==
Born at Palacio de las Dueñas in Seville, he was the third child and second son of Manuel Falcó y Escandón, 9th Duke of Montellano, 11th Marquess of Castel-Moncayo, 9th Marquess of Pons, Grandee of Spain, and his wife Hilda Fernández de Córdoba y Mariátegui, notable huntress, 12th Marchioness of Mirabel, 3rd Countess of Santa Isabel, 10th Countess of Berantevilla. His maternal grandfather was Joaquín Fernández de Córdoba y Osma, 8th Duke of Arión, who was president of Real Club de la Puerta de Hierro between 1896 and 1901.

Falcó succeeded to the Marquessate of Griñón in 1955, when his maternal grandfather ceded the title to him. In 1978, Falcó inherited the Marquessate of Castel-Moncayo after the death of his father, thus becoming a Grandee of Spain.

He managed the family estate-bottled wine brand "Marqués de Griñón", which earned him high recognition. The American magazine Wine Spectator listed it in 2014 as one of the greatest wines in the world.

As the husband of Isabel Preysler between 1980 and 1985, Falcó became the stepfather of her children, including Julio Iglesias Jr. and Enrique Iglesias.

== Issue ==
Children with Jeannine Girod y del Avellanal:

- Manuel Falcó y Girod, 13th Marquess of Castel-Moncayo (b. 1964)
- Alejandra Falcó y Girod, 13th Marchioness of Mirabel (b. 1967)

Children with María Isabel Preysler y Arrastía:

- Tamara Falcó, 6th Marchioness of Griñón (b. 1981)

Children with María de Fátima de la Cierva y Moreno:

- Duarte Falcó y de la Cierva (b. 1994)
- Aldara Falcó y de la Cierva (b. 1997)

== Death ==
Falcó died on 20 March 2020 in Fundación Jiménez Díaz, a hospital in Madrid, as a result of COVID-19. His son Manuel succeeded to the title of Marquess of Castel-Moncayo, whilst daughter Tamara succeeded to the Griñón title.

== Titles ==
- 12th Marquess of Castel-Moncayo (GE)
- 5th Marquess of Griñón

Spanish nobility
Preceded by Joaquín Fernando Fernández de Córdoba y Osma	Marquess of Griñón; 9 December 1955 – 20 March 2020	Succeeded by Tamara Falcó y Preysler
Preceded by Manuel Falcó y Escandón	Marquess of Castel-Moncayo; 20 May 1981 – 20 March 2020	Succeeded by Manuel Falcó y Girod
