= Duke of Fernán Núñez =

Dukedom of Fernán Núñez
- Creation date: 1639; Count of Fernán Núñez; 1817; Duke of Fernán Núñez
- Created by: Fernando VII
- Peerage: Peerage of Spain
- First holder: Carlos José Gutiérrez de los Ríos y Sarmiento de Sotomayor, 1st Duke of Fernán Núñez
- Present holder: Manuel Falcó y Anchorena, 6th Duke of Fernán Núñez

Duke of Fernán Núñez (Spanish: Duque de Fernán Núñez) is a hereditary title of nobility in the Peerage of Spain accompanied by the dignity of Grandee. The Countship of Fernán Núñez granted in 1639 to Alonso Gutiérrez de los Ríos was elevated to a dukedom in 1817 in the person of Carlos Gutiérrez de los Ríos, who became the 1st Duke of Fernán Núñez. The accompanying Grandeeship was granted in 1728, prior to being elevated to a Dukedom.

The name makes reference to the municipality of Fernán Núñez, in Cordoba, Spain.

== Counts of Fernán Núñez (1639) ==
- Alonso Estacio Gutiérrez de los Rios y Angulo, 1st Count of Fernán Núñez
- Ana Antonia Gutiérrez de los Ríos y Quesada, 2nd Countess of Fernán Núñez
- Francisco Diego Gutiérrez de los Ríos, 3rd Count of Fernán Núñez
- Pedro Gutiérrez de los Ríos, 4th Count of Fernán Núñez
- José Diego Gutiérrez de los Ríos y Zapata, 5th Count of Fernán Núñez
- Carlos José Gutiérrez de los Ríos, 6th Count of Fernán Núñez
- Carlos José Gutiérrez de los Ríos y Sarmiento de Sotomayor, 7th Count of Fernán Núñez

== Dukes of Fernán Núñez (1817) ==
- Carlos José Gutiérrez de los Ríos y Sarmiento de Sotomayor, 1st Duke of Fernán Núñez
- María Francisca de Asís Gutiérrez de los Ríos y Solís Vignancourt, 2nd Duchess of Fernán Núñez
- María del Pilar Ossorio y Gutiérrez de los Ríos, 3rd Duchess of Fernán Núñez
- Manuel Felipe Falcó y Osorio, 4th Duke of Fernán Núñez
- Manuel Falcó y Álvarez de Toledo, 5th Duke of Fernán Núñez
- Manuel Falcó y Anchorena, 6th Duke of Fernán Núñez

== Palace of Fernán Núñez ==
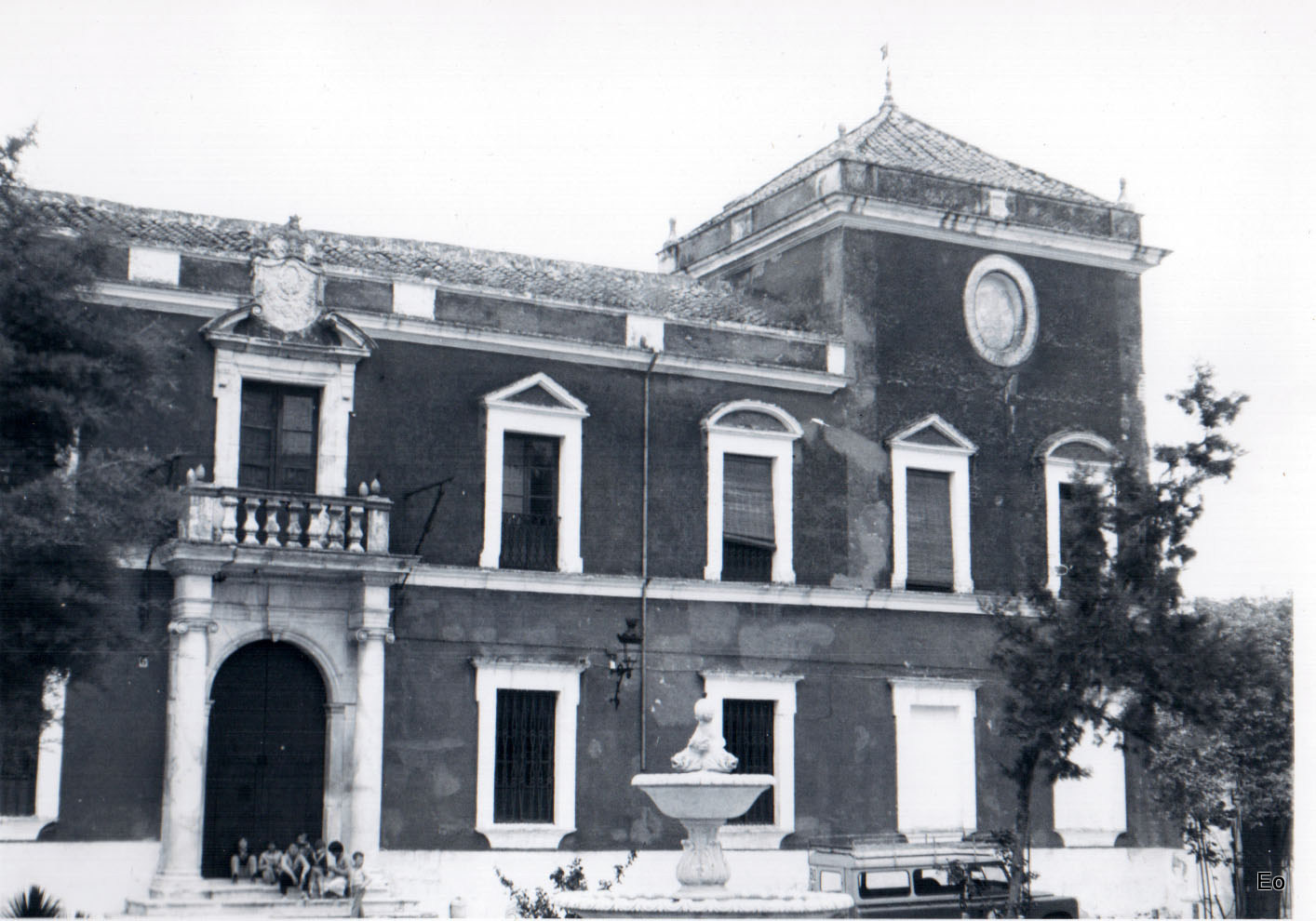
The palace of Fernán Núñez in the second half of the 20th Century.

The ducal palace of Fernán Núñez was built in Fernán Núñez, Córdoba, between 1783 and 1787. It is one of the most important buildings of civil character in the province of Córdoba, declared an Asset of Cultural Interest in 1983. Of neoclassical architecture, it was built by the 6th Count of Fernán Núñez, during his time as ambassador in Portugal. The palace is inspired by the facade of the Necessidades Palace of the Portuguese capital, where the Spanish embassy was located at the time.

== See also ==
- List of dukes in the peerage of Spain
- List of current grandees of Spain

== Bibliography ==
- Hidalgos de España, Real Asociación de (2018). Elenco de Grandezas y Títulos Nobiliarios Españoles. Ediciones Hidalguía. ISBN 978-84-94841-02-6.
