= Marquess of Castel-Moncayo =

Hereditary title in the Peerage of Spain

Marquessate of Castel-Moncayo
- Creation date: 9 November 1682
- Created by: Charles II
- Peerage: Peerage of Spain
- First holder: Baltasar de Fuenmayor y Camporredondo
- Present holder: Manuel Falcó, 13th Marquess of Castel-Moncayo
- Heir apparent: Carlos Falcó y Corsini

Marquess of Castel-Moncayo (Spanish: Marqués de Castel-Moncayo) is a hereditary title in the Peerage of Spain, accompanied by the dignity of Grandee. It was granted in 1682 by Charles II to Baltasar de Fuenmayor, ambassador in Denmark–Norway, the Spanish Netherlands and the Republic of Venice.

The 12th Marquess, Carlos Falcó, died in Madrid on 20 March 2020 at the age of 83, as a result of COVID-19. He was succeeded by his eldest child, Manuel Falcó, who currently holds the title as 13th Marquess.

== Marquesses of Castel-Moncayo (1682) ==
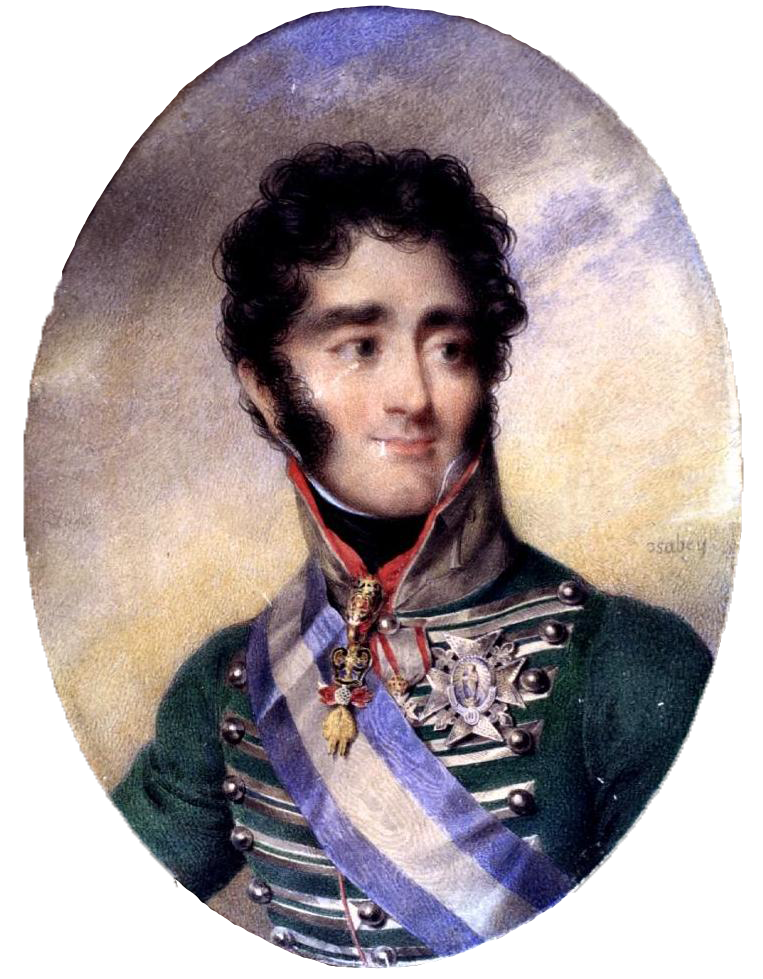
Portrait of the 6th Marquess, also 1st Duke of Fernán Núñez, by Isabey, c. 1817

- Baltasar de Fuenmayor y Camporredondo, 1st Marquess of Castel-Moncayo
- Manuela de Fuenmayor y Dávila, 2nd Marchioness of Castel-Moncayo
- Gaspara de Saavedra y Fuenmayor, 3rd Marchioness of Castel-Moncayo
- Diego María Sarmiento de Saavedra y Fuenmayor, 4th Marquess of Castel-Moncayo
- María de la Esclavitud Sarmiento De Silva y Sotomayor, 5th Marchioness of Castel-Moncayo
- Carlos José Gutiérrez de los Ríos y Sarmiento de Sotomayor, 6th Marquess of Castel-Moncayo
- Francisca de Asís Gutiérrez de los Ríos y Solís, 7th Marchioness of Castel-Moncayo
- María del Pilar Osorio y Gutiérrez de los Ríos, 8th Marchioness of Castel-Moncayo
- Felipe Falcó y Osorio, 9th Marquess of Castel-Moncayo
- Paloma Falcó y Escandón, 10th Marchioness of Castel-Moncayo
- Manuel Falcó y Escandón, 11th Marquess of Castel-Moncayo
- Carlos Falcó y Fernández de Córdoba, 12th Marquess of Castel-Moncayo
- Manuel Falcó y Girod, 13th Marquess of Castel-Moncayo

The heir apparent is the present holder's eldest son, Carlos Falcó y Corsini, who was born in 1999 and educated at Harrow School and at the University of Southern California.

== See also ==
- Marquess of Griñón
- List of current grandees of Spain
