= Daniel Lundh =

Franco-Swedish actor and writer

Daniel Lundh, is a Franco-Swedish actor, writer, screenwriter and director.

== Biography ==
Daniel Lundh was born in Malmö to a Swedish father and a French mother. He grew up in a multicultural environment, speaking several languages. The family lived in Sweden until he was seven, when they moved to Paris.

After graduating, Daniel left for New York, where he trained at the Lee Strasberg Theatre Institute and HB Studios. After a brief return to Paris, he moved to London, where he remained for three years, appearing on stage and in various British television series.

=== Film career ===
In 2006, he appeared in his first feature film in O Jerusalem, by Élie Chouraqui, alongside Ian Holm, JJ Feild and Patrick Bruel. In 2007, he played the male lead in Nadir Moknèche's Délice Paloma, alongside Aylin Prandi and Biyouna. The film received great reviews, and his performance earned him a mention at the Césars 2008 revelations. In 2008, he shot House of Saddam, a BBC and HBO co-production about the life of Saddam Hussein, then Les Héritières for France 3. The two-part TV movie is an adaptation of William Shakespeare's King Lear set in Corsica, with Jacques Weber, Amira Casar and Jean Benguigui. He plays Massimo, the vengeful bastard son. In 2010, Daniel joined 22 Bullets, a thriller about the Marseille mafia, alongside Jean Reno, Kad Merad, Jean-Pierre Darroussin, and Marina Foïs. In 2011, he played the famous Spanish toreador Juan Belmonte in Woody Allen's Midnight in Paris. He went on to play a series of international roles, notably in Canada and the UK. In 2017, he starred in Netflix's hit Spanish series Morocco: Love in Times of War. In 2019, he starred in Netflix's first original Spanish production: Alta Mar. He followed up with historical roles as Titus Labienus, Caesar's powerful yet incorruptible general, in Titans That Built the Ancient World by Roel Reine. Then, as a chameleon ex-Mossad agent on the run in It's a Good Day to Die.

== Filmography ==
=== Cinema ===
- 2006 : Ô Jérusalem by Élie Chouraqui : Roni
- 2007 : Délice Paloma by Nadir Moknèche : Riyad
- 2010 : L'immortel by Richard Berry: Malek Telaa
- 2011 : Midnight in Paris by Woody Allen : Juan Belmonte
- 2011 : Puerto Ricans in Paris by Ian Edelman : French Captain
- 2020 : El Guardián by John Chua : David Pozen
- 2024 : It's a Good Day to Die by John Chua : David Pozen

=== Television ===
- 2004: Hollyoaks: Jean-Claude (Channel 4)
- 2008: House of Saddam by Alex Holmes: Saddam Kamel
- 2009: Les Héritières by Harry Cleven: Massimo
- 2011: 'Rouge Diamant by Hervé Renoh: Javier Rodriguez
- 2011: Interpol: Captain Magnus Söder
- 2017: Morocco: Love in Times of War: Larbi (Netflix)
- 2017: Velvet Colección: Guía (Movistar)
- 2019: Coup de Foudre en Andalousie: César
- 2019-2020: High Seas: Pierre (Netflix)
- 2022: Now and Then: Bunker (Apple TV)
- 2023: A Paris Proposal: Gabriel Blanchet
- 2023: Titans That Built the Ancient World: Julius Caesar: Titus Labienus
- 2023: Sun, Rosé and Romance: Matteo Vega
