= Alejandra Onieva =

Spanish actress (born 1992)

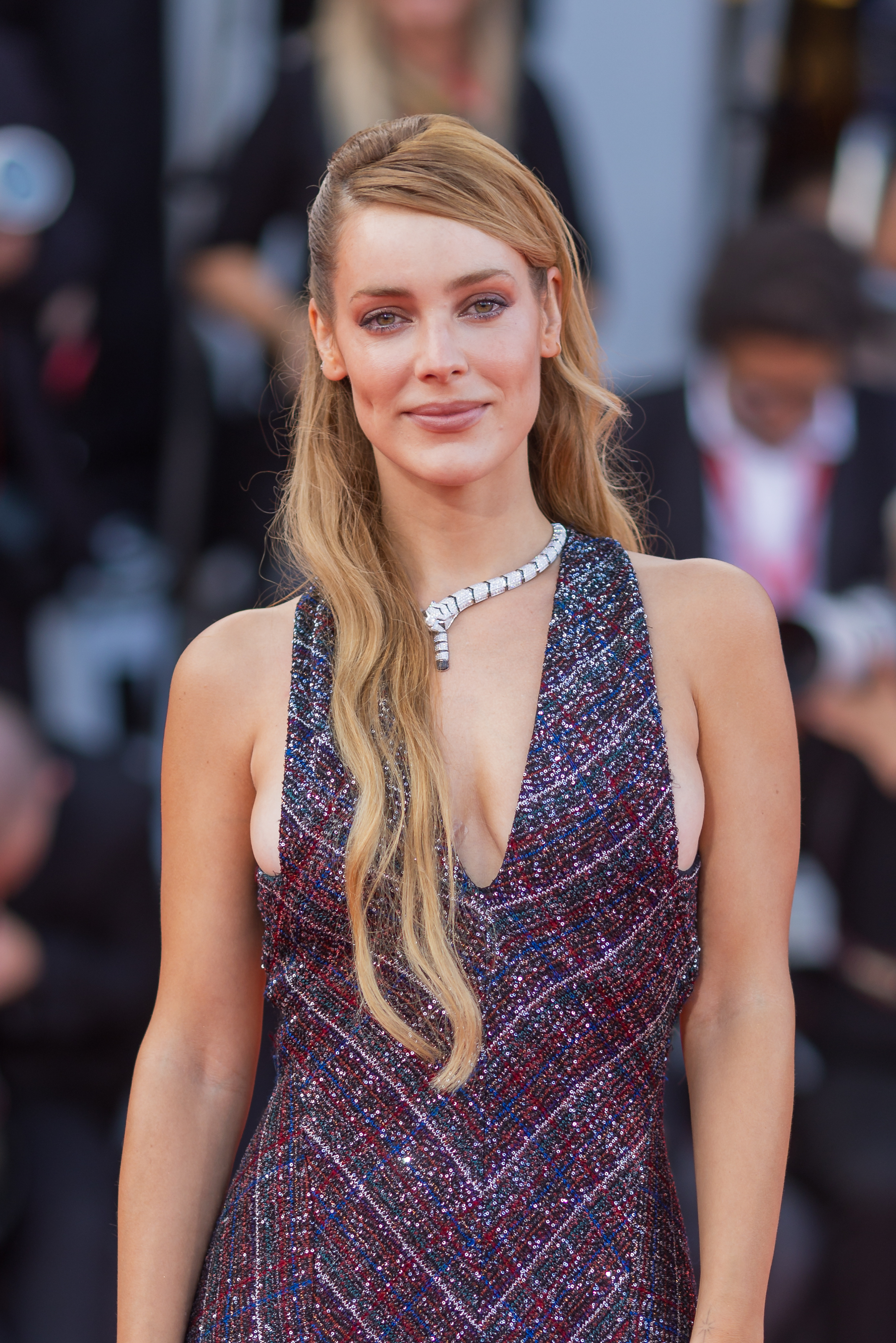
- Onieva in 2025
- Born: 1 June 1992 (age 34); Madrid, Spain
- Occupation: Actress
- Years active: 2011–present
- Spouse: Jesse Williams (m. 2026)
- Children: 1
- Relatives: Tamara Falcó, 6th Marchioness of Griñón (sister-in-law)

Alejandra Onieva Molas (born 1 June 1992) is a Spanish actress best known for appearing as Soledad Castro Montenegro in the long-running telenovela El secreto de Puente Viejo, and in the Spanish Netflix original series Alta Mar (High Seas).

== Early life ==
Alejandra Onieva Molas was born on June 1, 1992, in Madrid, Spain, to father Iñigo Onieva. She has an older brother named Iñigo, a younger brother named Jaime, and a stepsibling named Guille, who was born after her parents' divorce from her father's new marriage.

== Career ==
Onieva studied in the schools of interpretation Interactive Study and Fourth Wall. She started studying advertising, public relations and fashion but shortly thereafter she left her university because she had been selected to play one of the main roles in the daily series El secreto de Puente Viejo.

She has participated in the play Mezclando colores. El secreto de Puente Viejo was her first job as an actress on the small screen.

Beginning in 2015, she joined the cast of the planned Antena 3 series La sonrisa de las mariposas.

In 2017 she was part of the cast of the Telecinco series, Ella es tu padre with the actors Carlos Santos, María Castro and Rubén Cortada among others. The series premiered on September 4, 2017, to a positive reception but experienced a decline in viewership, leading to its suspension after the seventh episode aired on October 17 of the same year. In July 2018, it was announced that the remaining episodes would be broadcast on FDF. At the end of the same year she premiered Presumed Guilty, together with Miguel Ángel Muñoz, on Antena 3.

In May 2019, the first season of the Spanish Netflix original series Alta Mar (High Seas) premiered, with Onieva starring alongside Ivana Baquero and Jon Kortajarena. She continued as one of the leads in the two subsequent seasons, which aired in November 2019 and August 2020.

== Personal life ==
In September 2025, Onieva was reported to be dating actor Jesse Williams. In May 2026, it was reported that they eloped and were expecting their first child together. Their first child was born on 14 September 2026, in Los Angeles.

Her brother Íñigo is married to Tamara Falcó, 6th Marchioness of Griñón.
