= Gonzalo Fernández de Córdoba (disambiguation) =

Gonzalo Fernández de Córdoba (1453–1515) was a Spanish general and statesman.

Gonzalo Fernández de Córdoba may also refer to:

- Gonzalo Fernández de Córdoba (1520–1578), Spanish statesman and governor of Milan
- Gonzalo Fernández de Córdoba (1585–1635), Spanish military leader during the Eighty Years' War
- Gonzalo Fernández de Córdoba, 9th Duke of Arión, Spanish sailor and Olympian
