= Onieva =

Onieva is a Spanish surname. Notable people with the surname include:

- Alejandra Onieva (born 1992), Spanish actress
