= Chabeli Iglesias =

Spanish socialite

Chábeli Iglesias
- Born: María Isabel Iglesias Preysler; 3 September 1971 (age 55); Cascais, Portugal
- Occupations: Journalist, socialite
- Spouses: Ricardo Bofill Maggiora Vergano (m. 1993; div. 1996); Christian Altaba (m. 2001)
- Children: 2
- Parents: Julio Iglesias; Isabel Preysler
- Relatives: Julio Iglesias Jr. (brother); Enrique Iglesias (brother); Tamara Falcó (half-sister); Neile Adams (grand-aunt); Steven R. McQueen (second cousin)

María Isabel "Chábeli" Iglesias Preysler (born 3 September 1971) is a Spanish journalist and socialite. She is the daughter of Spanish singer Julio Iglesias and Spanish-Filipina socialite Isabel Preysler, and the older sister of singers Julio Iglesias Jr. and Enrique Iglesias.

== Career ==
Iglesias has appeared in many local and international covers of gossip and entertainment magazines worldwide, at a young age, as the entertainment industry made the Iglesiases one of their favourite celebrity families. After the kidnapping of her grandfather in 1981, her father Julio Iglesias decided to move her and her brothers to safety in Miami in the United States, where she lived in protective custody. During the 1990s, Iglesias appeared in several American talk shows. This was followed by a television show called El Show de Chábeli, which aired on Univision.

== Personal life ==
Chábeli Iglesias was married to Ricardo Bofill Jr, the son of Spanish architect Ricardo Bofill. Their marriage ended three years later.

In June 1999, Iglesias was involved in a car accident in Los Angeles in California, requiring hospitalization. She was in the passenger seat when the vehicle rolled over several times and both passengers were ejected.

On 8 October 2001, she married businessman Christian Fernando Altaba. Their son Alejandro Altaba was born prematurely on 14 January 2002. Alejandro's godparents are Julio Iglesias, Jr. and Ana Boyer.

On 2 February 2010, Iglesias announced that she was pregnant with twin girls who were expected to be born in the summer of 2010. However, on 12 March 2010, People en Español reported that she had suffered a miscarriage. In February 2012, she announced that she and her husband had become parents of a daughter, Sofia Altaba on 4 January 2012, after a pregnancy kept totally secret.

== See also ==
- List of Spaniards
