= High Seas (TV series) =

Spanish television series

- Spanish: Alta mar
- Genre: Drama; Crime; Mystery; Period drama
- Created by: Ramón Campos; Gema R. Neira
- Starring: Ivana Baquero; Alejandra Onieva; Jon Kortajarena; Eloy Azorín; Chiqui Fernández; Tamar Novas; Daniel Lundh; Natalia Rodríguez; Laura Prats; Ignacio Montes; Begoña Vargas; Manuela Vellés
- Country of origin: Spain
- Original language: Spanish
- No. of seasons: 3
- No. of episodes: 22

Production
- Running time: 37–49 minutes
- Production company: Bambú Producciones

Original release
- Release: May 24, 2019 – August 7, 2020

High Seas (Spanish: Alta Mar) is a Spanish mystery series released on Netflix in May 2019. The program is set aboard a transatlantic ocean liner. It stars Ivana Baquero, Alejandra Onieva, Jon Kortajarena, Eloy Azorín, Chiqui Fernández, Tamar Novas, Daniel Lundh, Natalia Rodríguez, Laura Prats, Ignacio Montes, Begoña Vargas, and Manuela Vellés. The show was renewed for a second season in June 2019 and was released on November 22, 2019. Bambú Producciones is the production company behind the series. Actor Jon Kortajarena, who portrays character Nicolás Vázquez, confirmed season three of the show on his official Instagram page on November 6, 2019. A planned fourth season was cancelled by Netflix in mid-2020.

== Plot ==
Following the death of their father, sisters Eva and Carolina Villanueva travel on the ocean liner, Bárbara de Braganza (formerly Covadonga), en route from Spain to Brazil in the late 1940s. They become embroiled in investigating mysterious on-board deaths, a secret microfilm, and hidden Nazi gold. The series starts with a mysterious woman called Luisa asking for help from the sisters, who smuggle her on board. Later Luisa is apparently thrown off the ship into the sea, and thus the investigation starts. It seems to finish quickly when someone confesses but their suicide in confinement is suspicious. Eventually the sisters' father proves to be alive, having been thought dead for the past two years. Complications continue as the sisters must choose whom to believe – their father or their uncle – concerning the sending of people to concentration camps in trucks belonging to the family business. The true culprit is finally apprehended and Carolina gets married. But at the end of the first season, they receive a distress signal from a boat asking for help, and alter course to intercept.

== Cast ==
- Ivana Baquero (dub: Nathalie Buscombe) as Eva Villanueva, a headstrong, curious young author, who becomes wrapped up in mysteries aboard the ship as she faces writer's block.
- Alejandra Onieva (dub: Bethan Rose Young) as Carolina Villanueva, Eva's timid, mature older sister and Fernando's fiancée (later wife).
- Jon Kortajarena (dub: Adam Rhys Dee) as Nicolás Vázquez, a suave officer aboard the Bárbara de Braganza, who helps Eva with her investigations.
- Eloy Azorín (dub: Daniel Flynn) as Fernando Fábregas, Carolina's fiancé and owner of the ship. He and Eva do not get along, after she accused him of having a gambling addiction.
- Manuela Vellés (dub: Tamaryn Payne) as Luisa Castro Bermúdez / Sofía Plazaola, a stowaway whom Eva sneaks onto the ship.
- Chiqui Fernández (dub: Julia Brams) as Francisca de García, the Villanueva sisters' stern maid (seasons 1-2).
- Begoña Vargas (dub: Jade Matthew) as Verónica de García, Francisca's shy daughter who becomes embroiled in a love triangle.
- José Sacristán (dub: David Shaw Parker) as Pedro Villanueva, Eva and Carolina's uncle.
- Natalia Rodríguez (dub: Amy Noble) as Natalia Fábregas, Fernando's sister.
- Antonio Durán (dub: Wayne Forester) as Detective Varela, the slimy head of the ship's security.
- Tamar Novas (dub: Dominic Tighe) as Sebastián de la Cuesta, a rich playboy who romances Verónica.
- Ignacio Montes (dub: Ben Elliot) as Dimas Gómez, Sebastián's servant who also romances Verónica.
- Eduardo Blanco (dub: Tim Bentinck) as Capitán Santiago Aguirre, the ship's captain.
- Pepe Ocio (dub: Stephen Hogan) as Doctor Rojas, the ship's doctor.
- Laura Prats (dub: Naomi McDonald) as Clara Romero (seasons 1-2), the ship's lounge singer and Pierre's girlfriend.
- Daniel Lundh (dub: John Hasler) as Pierre, an officer aboard the ship and Clara's boyfriend.
- Félix Gómez (dub: Daniel Weyman) as Aníbal de Souza (season 1), Natalia's husband who stalks and rapes Clara.
- Luis Bermejo (dub: Neil McCaul) as Carlos Villanueva/Mario Plazaola (seasons 1-2), Eva and Carolina's father and Luisa/Sofia's uncle. Initially believed to be deceased.

=== Season 2 ===
- Claudia Traisac (dub: Clare Corbett) as Casandra Lenormand, one of those rescued who appears to be a psychic
- Antonio Reyes (dub: Antony Byrne) as Erich, one of the rescues servant to Casandra
- Abel Rodríguez (dub: Ewan Goddard) as Simón, one of the rescues.
- Chiquinquirá Delgado as Teresa, one of the rescues.

=== Season 3 ===
- Marco Pigossi as Fábio, a British spy.
- Morgan Symes as Steve Taylor, head of the British investigation into Untermann's virus
- Cristina Plazas as Carmen, family friend of Pedro
- Alejandra Onieva as Diana, Carmen's daughter
- Pep Anton Muñoz as Doctor Ayala, a doctor taking care of Diana
- Nicolás Francella as Héctor Birabent, takes over as first mate for Nicolás
- Claudia Galán as Chantal, Nicolás's wife
- Andrès López as Viktor Andonov,
- Itsaso Arana as Ana, a new maid aboard the cruise

=== Recurring ===
- Javier Taboada as Agustín, one of the receptionists.
- Gonzalo Kindelán as Arturo, a wealthy passenger on the ship and friend of Sebastián.
- Pepe Barroso as Julián, a third class passenger and skilled thief.

== Episodes ==
Season	Episodes	Originally released
1	8	May 24, 2019
2	8	November 22, 2019
3	6	August 7, 2020

=== Season 1 (2019) ===
No. overall	No. in season	Title	Directed by	Written by	Original release date
1	1	"The Albatross" (El albatros)	Carlos Sedes	Story by : Ramón Campos, Gema R. Neira, Daniel Martín Serrano, Curro Novallas & José Antonio Valverde; Teleplay by : Daniel Martín Serrano, Curro Novallas & José Antonio Valverde	May 24, 2019
Two sisters bring a stowaway, who calls herself Luisa, on board a ship traveling from Spain to Brazil. She claims she is fleeing her would-be husband who has threatened to kill her. The relationship dynamics of the main characters are established or started, for instance husband and wife Anibal and Natalia hate each other and he physically assaults her regularly so she spends her time drinking. The captain feels world-weary and is spooked by superstition when an albatross hits the bridge window and dies. Sebastian is a serial womaniser. Clara aspires above her station. Fernando is preoccupied and often oblivious to his fiancee Carolina. Eva and the first officer Nicolas strike up a friendship, and are talking together on deck later when Luisa is apparently thrown off the ship into the sea. Detective Varela, the head of ship's security, opens the investigation into the murder by limiting his enquiries to the lowest grade passengers.
2	2	"The Rings" (Los anillos)	Carlos Sedes	Story by : Ramón Campos, Gema R. Neira, Daniel Martín Serrano, Curro Novallas & José Antonio Valverde; Teleplay by : Daniel Martín Serrano, Curro Novallas & José Antonio Valverde	May 24, 2019
Eva accuses Fernando of lying. He convinces her and Carolina of his veracity but later disposes of evidence that he actually had lied. Varela removes Dimas' cabin mate, Manuel, and later he confesses to the murder. But he says he killed Luisa in the cabin, but Eva and first officer Nicolás both heard her scream as she was thrown, so they suspect something is being covered up. Manuel is found dead in confinement. Eva's and Nicolas' secret investigation finds material torn from a crewman's trousers found in the ventilation crawlspace leading to the room.
3	3	"Sofia" (Sofía)	Carlos Sedes	Story by : Ramón Campos, Gema R. Neira, Daniel Martín Serrano, Curro Novallas & José Antonio Valverde; Teleplay by : Daniel Martín Serrano, Curro Novallas & José Antonio Valverde	May 24, 2019
After Eva narrowly escapes death in a cabin fire, the captain, against the wishes of the ship owner and a wealthy shareholder, secretly turns the ship around, intending to return to port so that law enforcement can take over the investigation. Carolina asks her uncle Pedro about a woman in a photo. Pedro meets secretly with Dr Rojas with whom he shares a secret. Dimas mourns his friend's death. Carolina discovers that Luisa is alive; her real name is Sofía Plazaola, a German interpreter, and she appears in a photo alongside Carolina's and Eva's father.
4	4	"Change of Destination" (Cambio de rumbo)	Carlos Sedes	Story by : Ramón Campos, Gema R. Neira, Daniel Martín Serrano, Curro Novallas & José Antonio Valverde; Teleplay by : Curro Novallas, José Antonio Valverde & Daniel Martín Serrano	May 24, 2019
Luisa tells Carolina she sneaked on board to retrieve a microfilm containing evidence that her father was murdered by Pedro and Rojas. While she secretly searched the sisters' cabin, an assistant of Dr Rojas entered and drew a knife on her but her uncle Mario Plazaola, a facially disfigured crewman on board, intervened. It was the assistant's body that was thrown overboard, with Luisa deliberately screaming to make witnesses think the body was female. Unable to trust anyone, Luisa went into hiding. Nicolás worries the ship is headed into a storm. He confronts the captain, who is armed. Nicolas is forced to leave the bridge and the captain orders the bridge to be locked down. The captain’s decision spurs Aníbal to fetch a gun and confront the captain through the bridge window; the pair aim guns at each other. Nicolas pushes Anibal to the ground and is shot.
5	5	"The Storm" (La tormenta)	Lino Escalera	Story by : Ramón Campos, Gema R. Neira, Daniel Martín Serrano, Curro Novallas & José Antonio Valverde; Teleplay by : Curro Novallas, José Antonio Valverde & Daniel Martín Serrano	May 24, 2019
In the midst of a turbulent storm, Dr. Rojas and Eva save Nicolás. The captain, by now relieved of command and under guard in his cabin, is visited by a convalescing Nicolas. The captain passes command to him. Sebastián asks Dimas to help him win back Verónica. Dimas tries again to woo her but she goes back to Sebastian. Luisa finds the microfilm but Rojas captures her and seizes it. Anibal discovers that his wife Natalia has been poisoning him and assaults her. Clara enters the cabin. A fight ensues and Anibal falls, hits his head on the table, and dies.
6	6	"527 L." (527 L.)	Lino Escalera	Story by : Ramón Campos, Gema R. Neira, Daniel Martín Serrano, Curro Novallas & José Antonio Valverde; Teleplay by : Curro Novallas, José Antonio Valverde & Daniel Martín Serrano	May 24, 2019
Luisa frees herself, attacks Rojas, and retrieves the microfilm, but he chases her up onto the deck, but Eva and Carolina come to her rescue. Rojas is arrested. Under questioning by Varela, Fernando and Nicolas, Luisa tells an edited version of her story while still hiding the essential truths. As Luisa is being escorted to confinement she and Eva and Carolina agree to keep the microfilm secret. They encounter Pedro who recognises Luisa. The sisters look at the microfilm and confront their uncle with what they’ve deduced - that he and a business partner used their father's shoe distribution lorries to ship 527 people to a Nazi concentration camp. Clara and Natalia stage Anibal's death as an accident falling down a set of companionway stairs. Clara wants to tell but Natalia tells her they would go to prison. Nicolas and Varela examine Anibal's body and suspect he was murdered. Nicolas orders Varela not to investigate, saying he has lost confidence in him and that he must not tell anyone. Clara's boyfriend Pierre suspects her after finding blood on her shoe. He elicits information from Nicolas who tells him to investigate, discreetly. Fernando admits his secret to Carolina - that he's in debt and being blackmailed over a gambling debt, and she pays off Varela. Eva tells Nicolás she knows he is married, having seen the photo in his cabin. He tells her his wife was sent to a concentration camp by Nazis and he assumes she is dead. Pedro elicits the aid of Francisca to hide a suitcase of Nazi gold bullion (payment for allowing the Nazis to use the trucks). Carolina and Eva realise Luisa covered up where she found the microfilm. Carolina discovers the torn trouser material was from Luisa's uncle Plazaola's trousers. Eva tells Nicolas who institutes a shipwide search for him. Plazaola frees Luisa and they hide, with Plazaola revealing that Pedro is his brother (and thus father to Eva and Carolina).
7	7	"Three Hours" (Tres horas)	Lino Escalera	Story by : Ramón Campos, Gema R. Neira, Daniel Martín Serrano, Curro Novallas & José Antonio Valverde; Teleplay by : Curro Novallas, José Antonio Valverde & Daniel Martín Serrano	May 24, 2019
Nicolas finds Pedro and Rojas together, tells them he knows they're guilty and has them confined to their cabins under guard. Luisa and Plazaola hide in the cabin of Aguirre (former captain) who knows about the microfilm. Plazaola refuses to come forward while everyone thinks he murdered Manuel. Rojas contrives to make Carolina deathly ill, he is summoned to care for her, and he blackmails Eva into retrieving the microfilm from the captain's safe. Pierre investigates the staircase death, rattling Clara who confides in Natalia, but Varela observes their suspicious behaviour. Clara reveals the truth, and that Anibal had raped her. Sebastián pursues Dimas’s fuel idea. Aguirre questions the guard outside Manuel's cell who reveals that Varela was inside with the prisoner for 10 minutes, having ordered the guard elsewhere. Eva, unable to open the captain's safe, forces Nicolas to do so at gunpoint. On deck Rojas holds Eva at gunpoint but is captured. Eva injects Carolina with Rojas' life-saving medication, just as Plazaola bursts in to see his dying daughter. Everyone is stunned that Plazaola is the sisters' father Carlos, thought to have died in a car accident 2 years before.
8	8	"Cain" (Caín)	Lino Escalera	Story by : Ramón Campos, Gema R. Neira, Daniel Martín Serrano, Curro Novallas & José Antonio Valverde; Teleplay by : Curro Novallas, José Antonio Valverde & Daniel Martín Serrano	May 24, 2019
Two days later and Aguirre has been reinstated as captain though Nicolas remains acting captain. Pedro tells Nicolas that it was Carlos who sent the victims to the concentration camps and framed Pedro and Rojas by forging their signatures on the documents but Nicolas does not believe him. Carlos engineers a meeting with Pedro and Rojas. The latter pair are forced to agree, because Carlos did in fact frame them, to give Carlos the Nazi gold in return for Carlos engineering their escape when the ship docks. It is Carolina’s wedding day. Varela begins to suspect Natalia and Clara. Francisca learns Sebastien is courting Veronica and disapproves. Veronica discovers the suitcase of gold hidden by her mother and tells Eva, Carolina, Luisa/Sofia and Carlos. Carlos takes the gold into his own safe keeping. Later Eva discovers evidence that the gold was actually given to Carlos. She tells Carolina who causes a scene at her own wedding to demand the truth from their father. Carlos is arrested, and the sisters reconcile with Pedro and Francisca. Nicolas conducts the marriage of Carolina and Fernando. Carlos attacks a crewman and Pedro, and escapes. Meanwhile, Nicolas receives a distress signal from a mysterious small boat carrying a group of huddled figures and changes course to rescue them.

=== Season 2 (2019) ===
No. overall	No. in season	Title	Directed by	Written by	Original release date
9	1	"Casandra" (Casandra)	Manuel Gómez Pereira	Ramón Campos & Daniel Martín Serrano & Gema R. Neira & Curro Novallas & José Antonio Valverde	November 22, 2019
The ship rescues five castaways, including a woman named Casandra, who claims to have intuitive powers. Nicolás helps Eva search for her father.
10	2	"From the Dead" (De entre los muertos)	Manuel Gómez Pereira	Ramón Campos & Daniel Martín Serrano & Gema R. Neira & Curro Novallas & José Antonio Valverde	November 22, 2019
As Casandra's stories about ghosts begin troubling Carolina and other passengers, Eva becomes suspicious of the new passenger. Natalia is blackmailed by Detective Varela. Nicolás discovers his wife is actually alive in Brazil.
11	3	"Is Anybody There?" (¿Hay alguien ahí?)	Lino Escalera	Ramón Campos & Daniel Martín Serrano & Gema R. Neira & Curro Novallas & José Antonio Valverde	November 22, 2019
As Carolina and Capitán Aguirre begin to believe in Casandra's abilities after a séance, Eva and Fernando's distrust in her grows, and Eva begins to worry about her sister's mental state. Natalia handles Varela's blackmail, but is also forced to confront a rapidly unraveling Clara. Verónica is conflicted when she learns Sebastián is going to propose.
12	4	"Change Hands" (Cambio de manos)	Lino Escalera	Ramón Campos & Daniel Martín Serrano & Gema R. Neira & Curro Novallas & José Antonio Valverde	November 22, 2019
The ship is thrown into chaos as tensions, robberies, and ghost sightings of Rosa Marín begin to rise. Carolina begins to distrust Fernando as his behavior changes. Eva and Nicolás investigate the goings on as they attempt to figure out their relationship. Casandra's intentions become more unclear. Dimas makes a startling discovery about Sebastián.
13	5	"The Final Act" (El número final)	Manuel Gómez Pereira	Ramón Campos & Daniel Martín Serrano & Gema R. Neira & Curro Novallas & José Antonio Valverde	November 22, 2019
With the thief caught, Eva and Nicolás work to uncover the truth about Casandra and the rescues. Casandra's relationship with Carolina begins to derail her plans. Fernando’s denials about his involvement with Rosa Marín are met with doubts. Sebastián attempts to reconcile with Dimas and Verónica, who both give him the cold shoulder. Seeing an opportunity to get herself out of Aníbal's death, Natalia starts discrediting Clara.
14	6	"The Other Side" (El otro lado)	Manuel Gómez Pereira	Ramón Campos & Daniel Martín Serrano & Gema R. Neira & Curro Novallas & José Antonio Valverde	November 22, 2019
Rosa Marín's disappearance is energized when a new witness comes forward and a letter in which Rosa ends her affair with Fernando is found by Carolina. Carolina and Fernando's marriage is put to the test, as Carolina confronts her feelings for Casandra and Fernando's anger for her not supporting him against Casandra's claims. Eva and Nicolás' relationship is further complicated by their sleeping together. Sebastián formulates a plan to win back both Dimas and Verónica. Clara's grief and trauma overwhelm her.
15	7	"Guilties" (Culpables)	Lino Escalera	Ramón Campos & Daniel Martín Serrano & Gema R. Neira & Curro Novallas & José Antonio Valverde	November 22, 2019
After the body of Rosa Marín is discovered, Capitán Aguirre arrests Fernando as the prime suspect of her murder. Knowing his innocence, Eva, Carolina, and Casandra race against time to clear his name and discover the real murderer. A shocking confession by Fernando leads to his and Carolina's marriage being rocked — in more ways than one. Natalia takes control over the shipping company, as she deals with Fernando's arrest, Clara's death, and Pierre's rebuff. Sebastián and Carlos execute their respective plans, which don't go according to plan.
16	8	"Love Can Kill" (Amores que matan)	Lino Escalera	Ramón Campos & Daniel Martín Serrano & Gema R. Neira & Curro Novallas & José Antonio Valverde	November 22, 2019
As the ship finally arrives in Rio de Janeiro, Carlos dies from his wounds sustained during his botched escape; Sofía is missing after escaping in the lifeboat, having been recovered with help from a Rio police officer. Eva and Nicolás discover that Pedro has regained his sight, and was planning on taking the gold for himself. Erich and the other stowaways kidnap Carolina, believing her to be Rosa's killer. Carolina is rescued when Erich and Casandra confront Fernando by gunpoint, and she is found in one of their trunks. While signing out, Eva and Carolina realize that Francisca was the one who wrote the fake letter from Rosa, thus also being the killer. Francisca confesses she confronted Rosa about running off with Fernando, after which Rosa pulled out a gun on her; after being able to secure the gun, Francisca shot Rosa in self-defense. Haunted by Rosa's ghost, Francisca threatens to jump overboard, but is seemingly pushed over by Rosa's ghost. Verónica chooses herself over a relationship with Sebastián or Dimas. Nicolás reunites with his wife, thus ending his relationship with Eva. As the sisters drive off in their car (transported from Spain), they hint of another voyage in the future.

=== Season 3 (2020) ===
No. overall	No. in season	Title	Directed by	Written by	Original release date
17	1	"New Course" (Nuevo rumbo)	Lino Escalera	Ramón Campos, Gema R. Neira, Daniel Martín Serrano, Sara Alquézar & José Antonio Valverde	August 7, 2020
Bárbara de Braganza is seen with Nicolas calling for help, he then rushes a vial to Eva who is tending to her sisters who appears to have died from a mysterious virus. Seven days earlier, Eva meets Fabio, an agent for British intelligence services, who asks her help in arresting Untermann. Untermann has a lethal virus which is being brought aboard the ship bound for Mexico. Pedro has arranged for his friend Carmen and her daughter Diana to travel on the ship as well. Dr. Ayala is joining them to watch over Diana. Fabio introduces Eva to Steve Taylor aboard the ship. Steve is leading the investigation. Eva provides the combination to the safe with all the passengers' passports to Fabio and Steve. Diana is only pretending to be mute and medically fragile. A second ship, Roncesvalles, will be traveling behind the Bárbara de Braganza carrying cargo. Dimas and Veronica are now working aboard the Bárbara de Braganza. The captain of the Roncesvalles is kidnapped, Pierre suggests that Nicolas can take up command of the Roncesvalles. Nicolas leaves his wife, Chantal behind on the Bárbara de Braganza. Hector Birabent is called in to stand in as first officer in place of Nicolas. Steve, Fabio, and Eva wrongfully accuse a historian of being Untermann.
18	2	"Masks" (Máscaras)	Lino Escalera	Ramón Campos, Gema R. Neira, Daniel Martín Serrano, Sara Alquézar & José Antonio Valverde	August 7, 2020
After witnessing a magic show, Eva is given a note asking her to meet Steve on the deck. When she arrives, Steve is shot. Before dying, he says "Katona". Eva lies to explain why she is with Steve on deck. Fabio removes as many of Steve's belongings as possible before the inspector and ship owner arrive at Steve's cabin. Fabio then hides these in Eva's cabin. Fabio gives Eva a gun to protect herself. Dimas and Veronica are suspicious. Carolina's husband complains that she distant. There is an argument on the bridge about how to handle security. A Hungarian is suspected of being Alex Katona and a gun matching that of the killer is found by Fabio and Eva in his cabin. Nicolas' wife becomes worried after meeting Dr. Ayala. Carolina becomes concerned about her sister's involvement with Steve and is convinced to visit Diana. Dr. Ayala attacks Carolina and Diana is revealed to be Carolina's look alike. Diana as Carolina visits her sister to find out what she knows. Carolina is drugged to remain as Diana. Eva tells Diana everything she knows about the virus. The new First Officer makes claims that the Captain is acting strangely to Natalia, who he then kisses. Fabio learns that Eva has told her sister about the investigation and tries to no longer include her in his mission.
19	3	"Groundswell" (Mar de fondo)	Federico Untermann	Gema R. Neira, Daniel Martín Serrano, Sara Alquézar & José Antonio Valverde	August 7, 2020
Andonov's cabin is found ransacked. Eva accuses Fabio of interrogating Andonov. Andonov's body is found and Dr. Ayala is brought to confirm the death. The new first officer searches through Natalia's documents after spending the night together. Varela sees him leaving Natalia's cabin. Dr. Ayala is seen cleaning medical tools covered in blood. Fabio breaks into the infirmary to see Andonov's body. Carmen admits that she is only part of this because she is being blackmailed. Carmen tells Pedro she is concerned that Eva is involved in something dangerous. Diana calls the infirmary which prompts Eva and Fabio to flee just before being discovered by Varela and the captain. Fabio receives a coded telegram tell him that Untermann has already been apprehended. After a fire is found in Capitán Santiago, Pierre accuses him of having left a candle lit. Carolina gives Veronica the camera. Pierre and the first officer continue with their plan, Varela sees them discussing it. Chantal and Eva talk about Nicolas. Dr. Ayala interrupts them and Chantal confides in Eva that he was the doctor who tortured her at the concentration camp. Fabio acquires the camera from Dimas who is attempting to use it as a lighter.
20	4	"Chasing Shadows" (Persiguiendo sombras)	Federico Untermann	Gema R. Neira, Daniel Martín Serrano, Sara Alquézar & José Antonio Valverde	August 7, 2020
Eva finds Fabio after being hit by Carmen and Dr. Ayala who stole his photographs. The photograph is of a waiter named, Nestor. Varela arrests Fabio for having a bloody cloth in his case after someone calls to tip him off. Dr. Ayala is seen going into the Nestor's cabin. Varela believes that Fabio knows who killed Andonov and why and will not release him until Fabio tells him what he knows. Fabio bribes Varela to release him and Varela agrees to help Fabio. Carolina defends herself against Dr. Ayala and escapes with the photograph still drugged and dressed as Diana. Carmen and Diana catch up to her before she can reach Eva. Fabio devises a trap for Dr. Ayala. While drinking coffee, the captain hallucinates and is taken to the infirmary; Hector takes over command of the ship. Hector intends to change to course, so the Pierre can have revenge on Natalia for Clara's suicide. Diana as Carolina tries to stop Dr. Ayala from the trap, but Eva knocks her out. Fabio loses track of Dr. Ayala who goes to meet Katona. Dr. Ayala shoots Eva who is dressed as Katona.
21	5	"Locked Up" (Encerrados)	Lino Escalera	Gema R. Neira, Daniel Martín Serrano, Sara Alquézar & José Antonio Valverde	August 7, 2020
Eva who was wearing a bullet-proof vest, comes to as Varela arrests Dr. Ayala. Pedro grows more and more concerned about his friend, Carmen. Diana plans to kill Carolina and make it look like a suicide. Diana tries to explain her actions and win over Eva's trust. Veronica confides in Eva her concerns about Diana being in trouble. The captain realizes the ship is off course and tries to talk to Hector. Pierre and Hector force the captain back to his cabin. Nicolas becomes worried. Eva and Fabio go to help Diana but find the suicide note. They run to the deck of the ship to find Diana (as Carolina), about to push Carolina (as Diana) overboard. Eva unbandages Diana to see that she is the true Carolina. Fernado, Varela, Fabio, and Eva question Diana and Carmen. Diana is not Diana but a woman Dr. Ayala found in prison who he released and hired for this job. Carmen admits that the real Diana has been kidnapped and will be killed if Carmen does not also help Dr. Ayala. Fernado and Natalia find out the ship's course has changed. Hector orders them to be arrested. Pierre begins to look for Eva to arrest her as well. Eva gets the photo from Pedro. Ana the maid is Alex Katona. Carmen helps Diana escape but refuses to herself. Katona infects Diana with the virus. Hector and Katona kiss. Hector shoots at Eva and chases her. Nicolas pulls her into a cabin before Hector can find her.
22	6	"The Eternal Sea" (Mar eterno)	Lino Escalera	Gema R. Neira, Daniel Martín Serrano, Sara Alquézar & José Antonio Valverde	August 7, 2020
Fabio is arrested and locked up with Dr. Ayala. Pierre attempts to arrest Carolina and Eva but is stopped by Nicolas. Pierre finds out about the virus and tells how Hector approached him about the plan. Pierre admits that Hector was drugging Santiago's tea which caused the hallucinations. Santiago takes back control of the ship. Fabio is released from the brig. Diana wanders the ship infecting others. The virus spreads among passengers and crew quickly and it more than the infirmary can handle. Nicolas sends out a distress call. All those infected are moved to the canteen, everyone else is moved to the deck or their cabins. Dr. Ayala works to find a cure in exchange for immunity when they reach land. A warship arrives in response to their mayday. On his second try, Dr. Ayala is able to cure the virus, but the warship attacks before they have time to communicate the news. They begin treating patients with the cure and evacuating everyone. Nicolas goes back to get a yellow flag so the warship will not fire missiles at them. Nicolas sees that Katona has escaped and asks Eva to fly the yellow flag for him. Katona stabs Nicolas and Nicolas kills Katona. Eva returns to a dying Nicolas who tells her that he loves her. Fabio convinces Eva to leave Nicolas and board the last lifeboat. The episode ends with many lifeboats in the water with land just over the horizon.

== Production ==
The original season was filmed in the winter of 2018. Season two of the series was confirmed by Netflix in June 2019 and filming took place in the middle of 2019. Season three of the series was renewed in November 2019 and filming began that same month. Season three aired on August 7, 2020.

== English-language dubbing ==
A strategy bringing a mixture of British accents was employed as an alternative to accent standardisation, including a Standard British English (SBE) accent for the upper-class characters, an anachronistic Estuary English for the younger lower-class women, and, vis-à-vis the lower-class male characters, a mix of a Standard British accent and a Cockney-coloured accent sported by those involved in criminal activities.
