= Manolo Falcó =

Spanish peer and banker

Manuel Falcó y Girod, 13th Marquess of Castel-Moncayo, GE (born April 30, 1964), best known as Manolo Falcó, is a Spanish peer and banker. He is the current global head of banking, capital markets and advisory at Citigroup, a position he has held since September 2018. He is a member of The Trilateral Commission.

== Family ==
Falcó was born in Woodland, California, to one of the most important families in the peerage of Spain. His father, Carlos Falcó, 5th Marquess of Griñón, was at the time a graduate student at the University of California, Davis, where he met Manuel's mother, Jeannine Girod. The couple married in 1963.

Through his father, Falcó is a grandchild of the 9th Duke of Montellano and a great-grandchild of the 8th Duke of Arión, who was President of Club Puerta de Hierro. He is also a descendant of El Gran Capitán, amongst others.

As Carlos' eldest child, Manuel inherited the Marquessate of Castel-Moncayo (Grandee of Spain) in September 2020.

== Career ==
Falcó's banking career at Citi spans more than 20 years. Prior to it, he began working for S.G. Warburg in Madrid, followed by London. After 10 years at the firm, he joined Citi in Madrid and became head of operations for Spain and head of investment banking for Spain and Portugal. He then moved back to London to lead the EMEA investment banking division of Citi, and in September 2018, he became the global head of that branch.

== Titles and styles ==
=== Titles ===
- 13th Marquess of Castel-Moncayo (GE)

=== Styles ===
- 10 August 1964 – 20 May 1981: Don Manuel Falcó y Girod
- 9 March 1978 – 4 September 2020: The Most Excellent Don Manuel Falcó y Girod
- 4 September 2020 – present: The Most Excellent The Marquess of Castel-Moncayo
