= Marquess of Griñón =

Spanish noble title

- Creation date: 25 February 1862
- Created by: Isabella II
- Peerage: Peerage of Spain
- First holder: María Cristina Fernández de Córdoba y Álvarez de las Asturias-Bohorques
- Present holder: Tamara Falcó y Preysler, 6th Marchioness of Griñón
- Heir presumptive: Duarte Falcó y de la Cierva

Marquess of Griñón (Spanish: Marqués de Griñón) is a hereditary title of Spanish nobility. It was created by Queen Isabella II in 1862 for María Cristina Fernández de Córdoba (1862–1917), daughter of the 6th Duke of Arión. The name of the title refers to the municipality of Griñón in the Community of Madrid.

The 5th Marquess, Carlos Falcó, had held the title since 9 December 1955 until his death on 20 March 2020 due to COVID-19. He was succeeded by his second daughter, Tamara Falcó, from his second wife, Isabel Preysler.

The title lends its name to the eponymous wineries founded by the 5th Marquess in the early 70s.

== Marquesses of Griñón (1862) ==
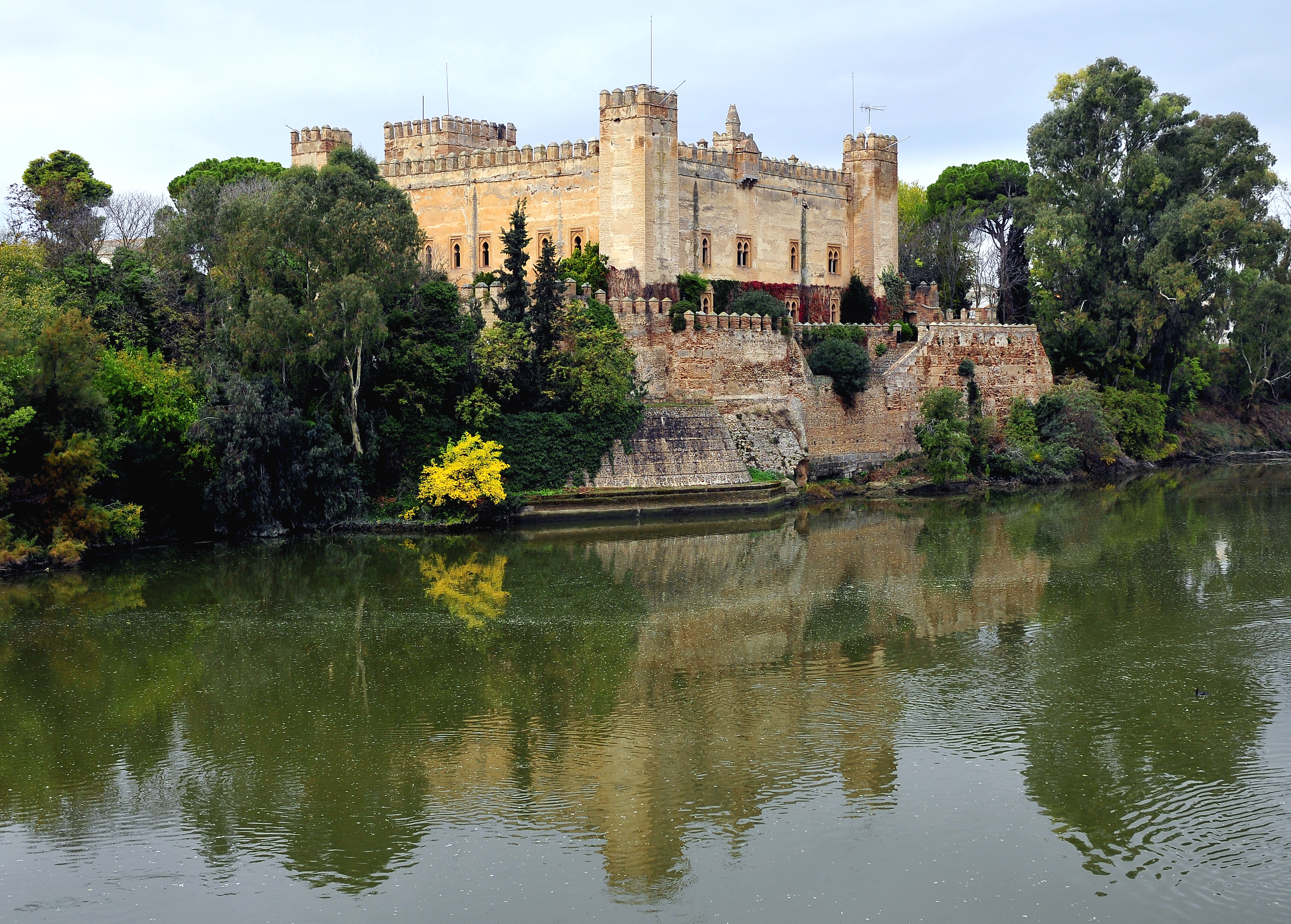
Castle of Malpica de Tajo, one of the seats of the Marquesses of Griñón

- María Cristina Fernández de Córdoba y Álvarez de las Asturias-Bohorques, 1st Marchioness of Griñón (1831-1916)
- Joaquín Fernando Fernández de Córdoba y Osma, 2nd Marquess of Griñón (1870-1957)
- Gonzalo Joaquín Fernández de Córdoba y Mariátegui, 3rd Marquess of Griñón (1913-1934)
- Joaquín Fernando Fernandéz de Córdoba y Osma, 4th Marquess of Griñón (1870-1957)
- Carlos Falcó y Fernández de Córdoba, 5th Marquess of Griñón (1937-2020)
- Tamara Isabel Falcó y Preysler, 6th Marchioness of Griñón (b. 1981)

The heir presumptive to the title is the present holder's paternal half-brother, Duarte Falcó y de la Cierva (b. 1994), who is the younger son of the 5th Marquess.

== See also ==
- Marquess of Castel-Moncayo
