= Caños Dorados Prize =

Spanish language literary award

The Caños Dorados Prizes (Premio Caños Dorados) are annual international prizes awarded in Spain to an original short story and an original poem written in the Spanish language. Organized by the Fernán Núñez City Council and the Córdoba Provincial Council, the prizes reward authors from any Spanish-speaking nation. The winners receive a monetary award in each category which depends on the sum of money established by the provincial council.

== List of winners ==
Winners listed first, followed by runners-up:

Short story:

2010 - Brisas y sombras (Javier Esteban González Andújar)

Una muerte imprevista (Matías Alejandro de Jesús)
Seis monedas (Gonzalo Tomás Salesky Lascano)
El secreto (Kalton Harold Bruhl)

Poetry:

2010 - La Aurora se deshace (María Luz López Gordillo)

Parque Pereyra (Marcelo Nasra)
Ángel de papel (Maritza Pardo)
Centroamérica (Bolívar Márquez Campodónico)
