= Carlos Gutiérrez de los Ríos =

Spanish diplomat (1779–1822)

The Most Excellent The Duke of Fernán Núñez GE
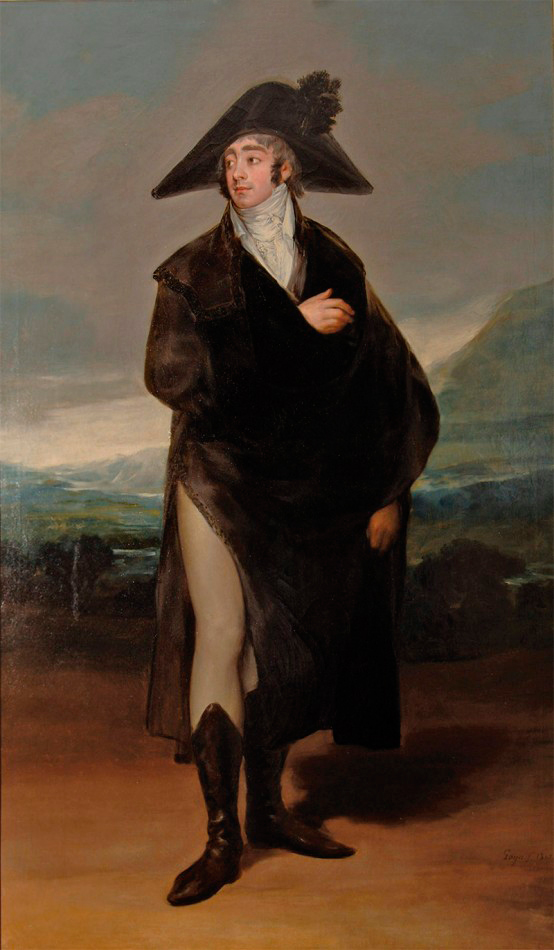
- Portrait by Francisco Goya c.1803

Ambassador of Spain to the United Kingdom
- In office 1817–1817
- Monarch: Ferdinand VII
- Preceded by: Pedro de Alcántara Álvarez de Toledo
- Succeeded by: Joaquín Campuzano Morentes

Ambassador of Spain to France
- In office 1816–1820
- Monarch: Ferdinand VII
- Preceded by: Antonio María Dameto y Crespí de Valldaura
- Succeeded by: José Gabriel de Silva-Bazán

Personal details
- Born: 3 January 1779 Lisbon, Portugal
- Died: 27 November 1822 (aged 43) Paris, France
- Spouse: María Vicenta de Solís y Lasso de la Vega (m. 1798)
- Relations: José Miguel de la Cueva, 14th Duke of Alburquerque (brother in law)
- Children: 2
- Parent(s): Carlos José Gutiérrez de los Ríos y Rohan-Chabot (Father); María de la Esclavitud Sarmiento (Mother)
- Occupation: Diplomat

Carlos José Francisco de Paula Gutiérrez de los Ríos y Sarmiento de Sotomayor, 1st Duke of Fernán Núñez (3 January 1779 – 27 November 1822) was a Spanish diplomat.

== Family and education ==
He was the son of Carlos José Gutiérrez de los Ríos y Rohan-Chabot, 6th Count of Fernán Núñez, and of María de la Esclavitud Sarmiento, 5th Countess of Castel Moncayo. He was born on 3 January 1779 in Lisbon, where his father had served as Ambassador.

== Career ==
He supported Ferdinand, Prince of Asturias in his claim to the throne. After the Tumult of Aranjuez and the abdication of Charles IV in 1808, he was sent to France to help deal with Napoleon. He was sent to negotiate the marriage of Charlotte Bonaparte to the King Ferdinand VII, which was rejected by Napoleon.

He then became part of a delegation, along with the Dukes of Frías and Medinaceli, that received Napoleon in Bayonne. He joined the entourage of King Joseph I to Spain. After the King left Madrid in July 1808, he joined the War of Independence and was declared a traitor along with several other Dukes by Napoleon. He served as the Ambassador of Spain to London and the Ambassador of Spain to France, where he oversaw the peace treaties following the fall of Napoleon and the succession to the Duchy of Parma.

== Personal life and death ==
He married María Vicenta Solís Vignancourt Lasso de la Vega, 6th Duchess of Montellano, 4th Duchess of Arco, 12th Marquise of Miranda de Anta and 7th Countess of Saldueña (c. 1780 – 4 June 1840) on 29 October 1798. Their marriage was unhappy and they had two children:

- Carlota Gutierrez de los Rios y Solis (25 December 1799 – 1800)
- María Francisca, 2nd Duchess of Fernán Núñez (4 October 1801 – 26 February 1836). She married Felipe Osorio y de la Cueva, 7th Count of Cervellón (27 June 1795 – 5 February 1859) and they had one daughter.

He died in Paris on 27 November 1822, at the age of 43 due to a horse fall.

== Titles and honours ==
=== Noble titles ===
- 7th Count of Fernán Núñez (23 February 1795 – 23 November 1817)
- 1st Duke of Fernán Núñez (23 November 1817 – 27 November 1822)
- 6th Marquess of Castel-Moncayo
- 10th Marquess of Alameda
- 11th Count of Barajas
- 4th Count of Villanueva de las Achas

=== Honours ===
- Knight of the Golden Fleece on 14 October 1814, invested by the Duke of York in London.
- Grand Cross of Charles III
