= Morocco: Love in Times of War =

- Tiempos de guerra
- Genre: Period drama
- Created by: Ramón Campos; Teresa Fernández-Valdés; Gemma R. Neira
- Directed by: David Pinillos; Manuel Gómez Pereira; Eduardo Chapero-Jackson
- Starring: Alicia Borrachero; Amaia Salamanca; Álex García; Anna Moliner; Verónica Sánchez; Cristóbal Suárez; José Sacristán; Álex Gadea; Silvia Alonso; Daniel Lundh
- Composer: Federico Jusid
- Country of origin: Spain
- Original language: Spanish
- No. of seasons: 1
- No. of episodes: 13

Production
- Executive producers: Ramón Campos; Teresa Fernández-Valdés; Sonia Martínez
- Running time: 70 minutes (approx.)
- Production companies: Atresmedia Televisión; Bambú Producciones

Original release
- Network: Antena 3
- Release: 20 September – 20 December 2017

Morocco: Love in Times of War (Spanish: Tiempos de guerra) is a war drama set primarily in 1920s Melilla, a Spanish city located in North Africa. Occurring during the Rif War or Morocco War, the series revolves around a group of nurses from Madrid who are sent to Africa by Queen Victoria Eugenia to open a hospital in the war torn region. The nurses learn firsthand the cruelty of war, but still find time for romance. The series debuted in 2017 on Antena 3 and in 2018 on Netflix.

== Plot ==
In 1921, Morocco is being ravaged by the events of the Rif War. The Riffian resistance in the country has killed many soldiers of the Spanish Army and wounded many more. To succour them, Queen Victoria Eugenie sends a group of nurses from the Spanish Red Cross to Melilla to establish a new hospital. Led by the Duchess of Victoria, María del Carmen Angoloti y Mesa, the group is composed of young women from Spain's upper classes.

The nurses arrive in Melilla and set up a hospital in an old school building. Almost immediately, they are put into action. Yet, despite all the horrors of war that surround them, these nurses have not lost hope and still find romance with the soldiers and doctors who surround them.

In time, the military high command recognizes that more lives can be saved on the front lines before wounded soldiers are even brought back to the hospital. None of these nurses is combat trained, but some of them will now have to learn how to stay alive while serving on the front lines.

== Cast ==
- Alicia Borrachero as Carmen Angoloti.
- José Sacristán as Colonel Vicente Márquez.
- Amaia Salamanca as Julia Ballester.
- Álex García as Fidel Calderón.
- Verónica Sánchez as Pilar Muñiz de Solaruce.
- Anna Moliner as Magdalena Medina.
- Álex Gadea as Lieutenant Andrés Pereda.
- Marcel Borràs as Alférez Pedro Ballester.
- Alicia Rubio as Verónica Montellano.
- Daniel Lundh as Larbi Al Hamza.
- Silvia Alonso as Susana Márquez.
- Carmen Balagué as Manuela de la Maza.
- Cristóbal Suárez as medical lieutenant Luis Garcés.
- Nuria Herrero as Raquel Fuentes.
- Miguel Rellán as Suboficial Dámaso.
- Vicente Romero as Comandante Silva.
- Federico Pérez as medical lieutenant Guillermo.
- Toni Agustí as Captain Somarriba.
- David Marcé as Daniel.
- Cuca Escribano as the Queen.
- Marc Clotet as Alejandro Prada.
- Pepa Rus as Gloria Montellano.

== Production ==
Produced by Atresmedia Televisión in collaboration with Bambú Producciones, the series was created by Ramón Campos, Teresa Fernández-Valdés and Gemma R. Neira. Filming began in March 2017. Shooting locations included Chinchón, Tenerife, Toledo and Madrid. The episodes were directed by David Pinillos, Manuel Gómez Pereira and Eduardo Chapero Jackson whereas the writing team was formed by Carlos López, Daniel Martín Serrano, Estibaliz Burgaleta, Nacho Pérez de la Paz and Miguel Ángel Fernández. Ramón Campos, Teresa Fernández-Valdés and Sonia Martínez were credited as executive producers. The musical score was composed by Federico Jusid.

== Release ==
Series	Episodes	Originally released			Ref.
Series	Episodes	First released	Last released	Network	Ref.
1	13	20 September 2017	20 December 2017	Antena 3	

This is a caption
No. in season	Title	Viewers	Original release date	Share (%)
1	"Destino África"	2,806,000	20 September 2017	17.3
2	"Todos son héroes"	2,845,000	27 September 2017	18.6
3	"Promesa de salvación"	2,335,000	3 October 2017	14.8
4	"Querida Julia"	2,224,000	11 October 2017	14.3
5	"El rescate"	2,367,000	18 October 2017	15.2
6	"La reina enfermera"	2,208,000	25 October 2017	14.4
7	"El desquite"	2,101,000	1 November 2017	14.0
8	"Los que nunca se rinden"	2,303,000	8 November 2017	15.6
9	"El último adiós"	2,307,000	15 November 2017	15.3
10	"El compromiso"	2,354,000	22 November 2017	15.5
11	"La verdad por delante"	2,318,000	29 November 2017	15.3
12	"Solo tenemos una vida"	2,439,000	13 December 2017	15.7
13	"Los cañones de Gurugú"	2,401,000	20 December 2017	15.6

== Awards and nominations ==
Year	Award	Category	Nominee(s)	Result	Ref.
2017	5th MiM Series Awards	Best Drama Series		Nominated	
2017	5th MiM Series Awards	Best Screenplay		Nominated	
2017	5th MiM Series Awards	Best Drama Actress	Alicia Borrachero	Nominated	
2017	5th MiM Series Awards	Best Drama Actor	Álex García	Nominated	
