= Francisco Gutiérrez de los Ríos =

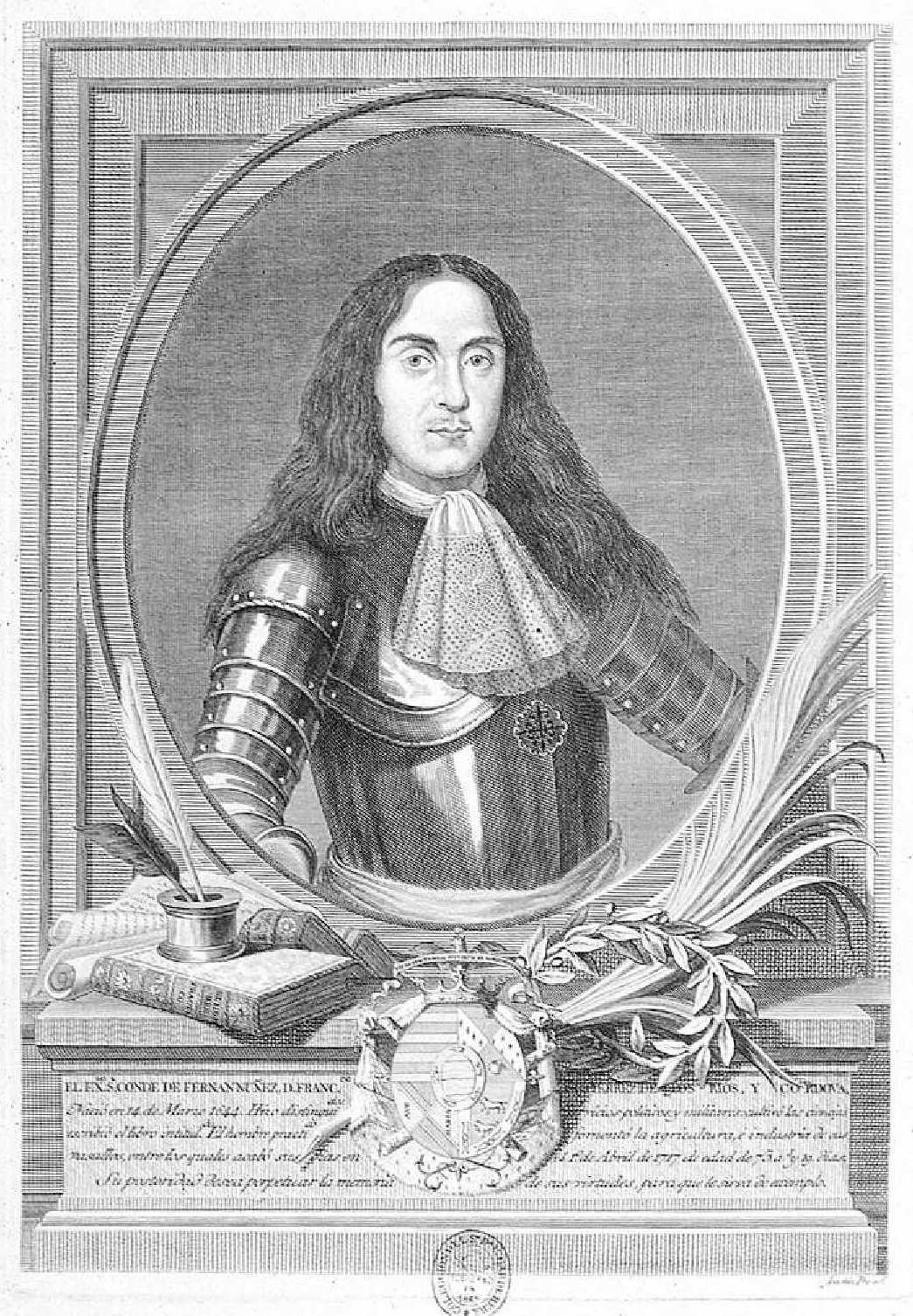
Portrait of Francisco Gutiérrez de los Ríos y Córdoba

Francisco Gutiérrez de los Ríos (1644-1721) was a Spanish diplomat and writer.

== Life and career ==
Francisco Gutiérrez de los Ríos, third count of Fernán Núñez, was born in the year 1644 and inherited the title from his mother, Ana Antonia Gutiérrez de los Ríos Córdova y Argote, whose surnames he adopted. His father was Diego Gutiérrez de los Ríos y Guzmán, a knight of the Order of Alcántara and a cousin of his wife. He died on April 21, 1721.

From serving as a page (menino) to Queen Mariana of Austria in his childhood to becoming the Governor-General of the Coasts of Andalusia and defending Cádiz against the English twice, he led a remarkable life. Known for his diverse interests, Francisco was a soldier, diplomat, Mediterranean traveler, and intellectual.

== Intellectual contributions and role in the Novatores movement ==
Among his intellectual contributions, Gutiérrez de los Ríos authored El hombre práctico o Discursos sobre su conocimiento y enseñanza, which was printed in Brussels in 1680 and reprinted in Madrid in 1764. The work is available online in the Biblioteca Virtual Miguel de Cervantes. The book was meant to be a philosophical work for the benefit of his son. Furthermore, Gutiérrez de los Ríos wrote almost six thousand letters from 1679 to 1684, most notably to Henry FitzRoy, 1st Duke of Grafton and Oquere Osinu, an enslaved prince of Fante people. His correspondence provides in early modern European letter-writing.

He supported the Novatores movement which, as Pardo-Tomás et al., (2007) put it, emerged in the last third of the 18th century and; "attempted to overcome the Spanish absence from the starting point of the Scientific Revolution and intended to connect with “modern European science through the launching of a “renovation programme” which “denounced the causes of the backwardness and suggested measures to solve it."

Retiring to Fernán Núñez, he avoided the court and implemented liberal reforms to improve sanitation, food supply, and the local economy.
