= Isabel Preysler =

Spanish and Filipino journalist, socialite, and television host

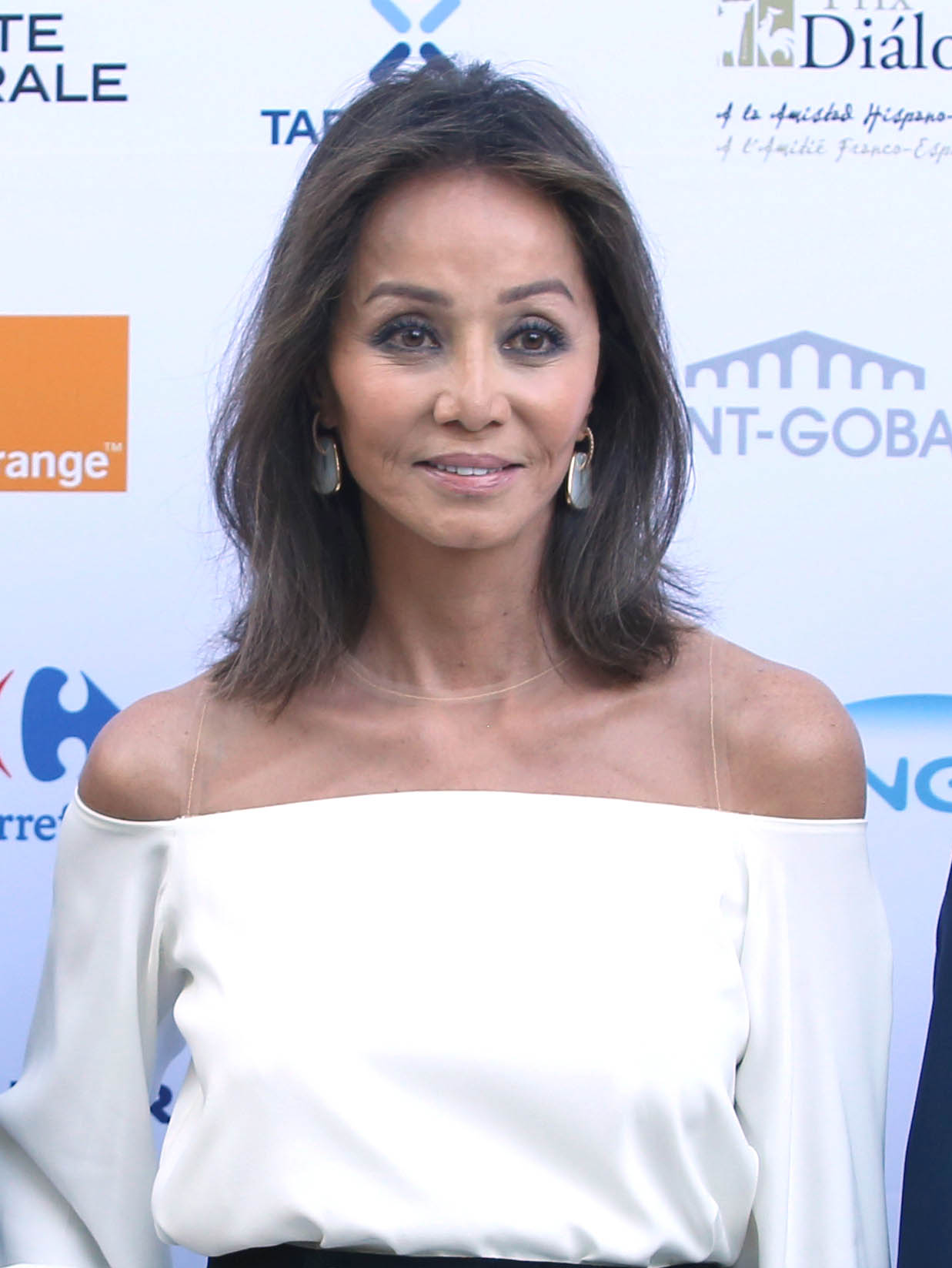
- Preysler at the 13th Prix Diálogo in 2016
- Born: María Isabel Preysler Arrastía; February 18, 1951 (age 75); Manila, Philippines
- Citizenship: Philippines; Spain
- Occupations: Journalist; television host
- Title: Marchioness of Griñón (1980–1987)
- Spouses: Julio Iglesias (m. 1971; div. 1979) Carlos Falcó, 5th Marquess of Griñón (m. 1980; div. 1985) Miguel Boyer (m. 1987; died 2014)
- Partner: Mario Vargas Llosa (2015–2022)
- Children: 5, including Chabeli, Julio Jr., Enrique and Tamara
- Relatives: Neile Adams (maternal aunt)

María Isabel Preysler Arrastía (born February 18, 1951) is a Spanish and Filipino socialite and television host. She is the mother of singers Enrique Iglesias and Julio Iglesias Jr., journalist Chábeli Iglesias, Tamara Falcó, 6th Marchioness of Griñón, and Ana Boyer Preysler.

== Early life ==
Preysler was born in Manila, Philippines, the third of six children to a wealthy family of Iberian Spanish and native Filipino ancestries. She attended the Assumption Convent (now Assumption College San Lorenzo), a private Roman Catholic school. Her father, Carlos Preysler y Pérez de Tagle, was the executive director of Philippine Air Lines (now Philippine Airlines) and one of the board of directors of the Banco Español de Manila (now Bank of the Philippine Islands), while her mother, María Beatriz Arrastía y Reinares, was the owner of a real estate company in Manila. She is the niece of actress Neile Adams, who is her mother's half-sister. She is also the first cousin once removed of American actor Steven R. McQueen, who is Neile's grandson.

== Career ==
During her youth, Preysler was a model who participated in beauty pageants and charity events for the Sheraton Hotels and Resorts in Manila and went on to win titles in several events. At the age of 16, she immigrated to Madrid, to live with her uncle and aunt and to attend Mary Ward College, an Irish Catholic university in Spain, where she studied accounting.

Preysler began working as a journalist for Spanish celebrity news magazine ¡Hola! in 1970, and her first interviewee was her future husband Julio Iglesias. In 1984, she hosted a Spanish lifestyle television programme, Hoy en Casa, and has hosted and appeared in various programs since. In May 2001, she was Prince Charles' guest of honour for the opening of his Spanish Garden at the Chelsea Flower Show in England. She was his guest of honor again in 2005 at a garden party during a holiday to Spain by the Royal Crown. In 2004, Preysler became Spain's welcoming host for David and Victoria Beckham when she hosted a welcoming party at her house for the celebrity couple. She became close friends with Victoria and was often photographed shopping with her during their stay in Madrid.

Preysler continues to be the national spokesmodel for Ferrero Rocher, Suárez jewelry, Manolo Blahnik shoes, Chrysler cars and Porcelanosa tiles, for which American Hollywood actor George Clooney worked with her in 2006 to represent the brand in an advertising campaign.

Readers at ¡Hola! magazine voted Preysler as the most elegant and best-dressed woman in Spain for 1991, 2002, 2006 and 2007.

In 2006, Preysler was honored (along with Hillary Clinton, Shakira and Yoko Ono, among others) with the Women Together Award, which honors women for their philanthropic contributions to the United Nations in New York, making her the first woman of Filipino descent in history to win the award.

In 2007, she and her daughters were invited by Prince Charles to be guests of honour at his London home, Clarence House.

== Personal life ==
In 1970, Preysler was introduced to a retired footballer named Julio Iglesias, who had just signed a recording contract to become a singer. Iglesias invited her to watch a Juan Pardo concert. They married seven months later on January 29, 1971, in Illescas, in a religious ceremony. They were married for seven years until their divorce, and the couple had three children – María Isabel (born 1971), Julio José (born 1973) and Enrique Miguel (born 1975).

On March 23, 1980, Preysler married Carlos Falcó, 5th Marquess of Griñón. The couple had one daughter, Tamara Isabel Falcó (born 1981). They divorced in 1985.

Her third marriage, in 1987, was to the former Spanish finance minister Miguel Boyer, who died on September 29, 2014. The couple had one daughter, Ana Boyer Preysler (born 1989).

From 2015 to 2022, she was in a relationship with Peruvian Nobel laureate writer, journalist and politician Mario Vargas Llosa.

Her father, Carlos Preysler, died in 1994. After his death, her mother, Beatriz Arrastia, lived with her in Madrid until her own death in 2021 at age 98. Her daughter Tamara has been the 6th Marchioness of Griñón since her father's death in 2020.

== Titles ==
- 1980–1987: The Most Excellent The Marchioness of Griñón
