= Palacio del Duque de Arión =

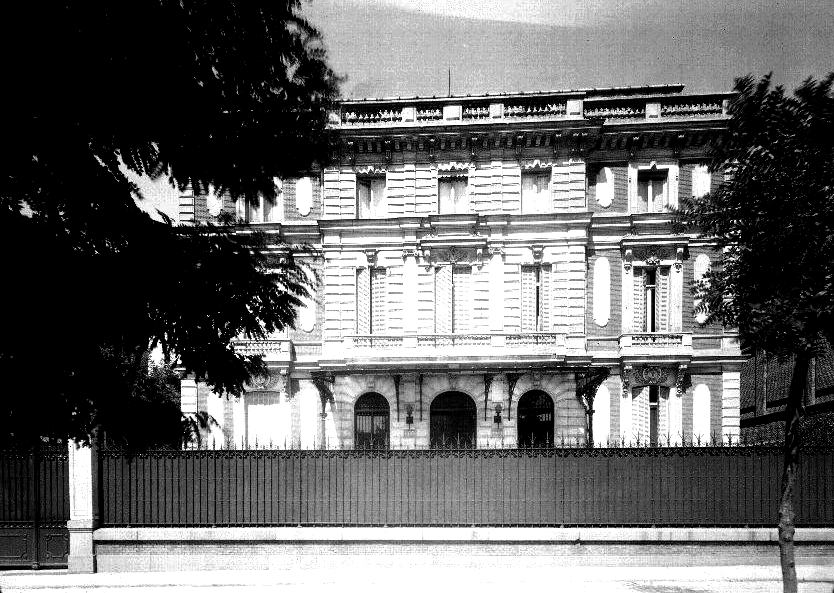
The disappeared palace

The Palacio del Duque de Arión (Spanish for: Palace of the Duke of Arión) now disappeared, was in the number 7 of the Paseo de la Castellana, in Madrid (Spain). Was also known as the Palacio de José Campo and Palace of the Marquesses of la Puente and Sotomayor, by Joaquín Fernández de Córdoba, who held both titles, he was also who made the plans. Now in its place is the local building of the Spanish Credit Bank (Banesto) (this latter made in 1966).
