= Carlos José Gutiérrez de los Ríos =

Spanish diplomat and soldier (1742–1795)

Captain General The Most Excellent The Count of Fernán Núñez GE
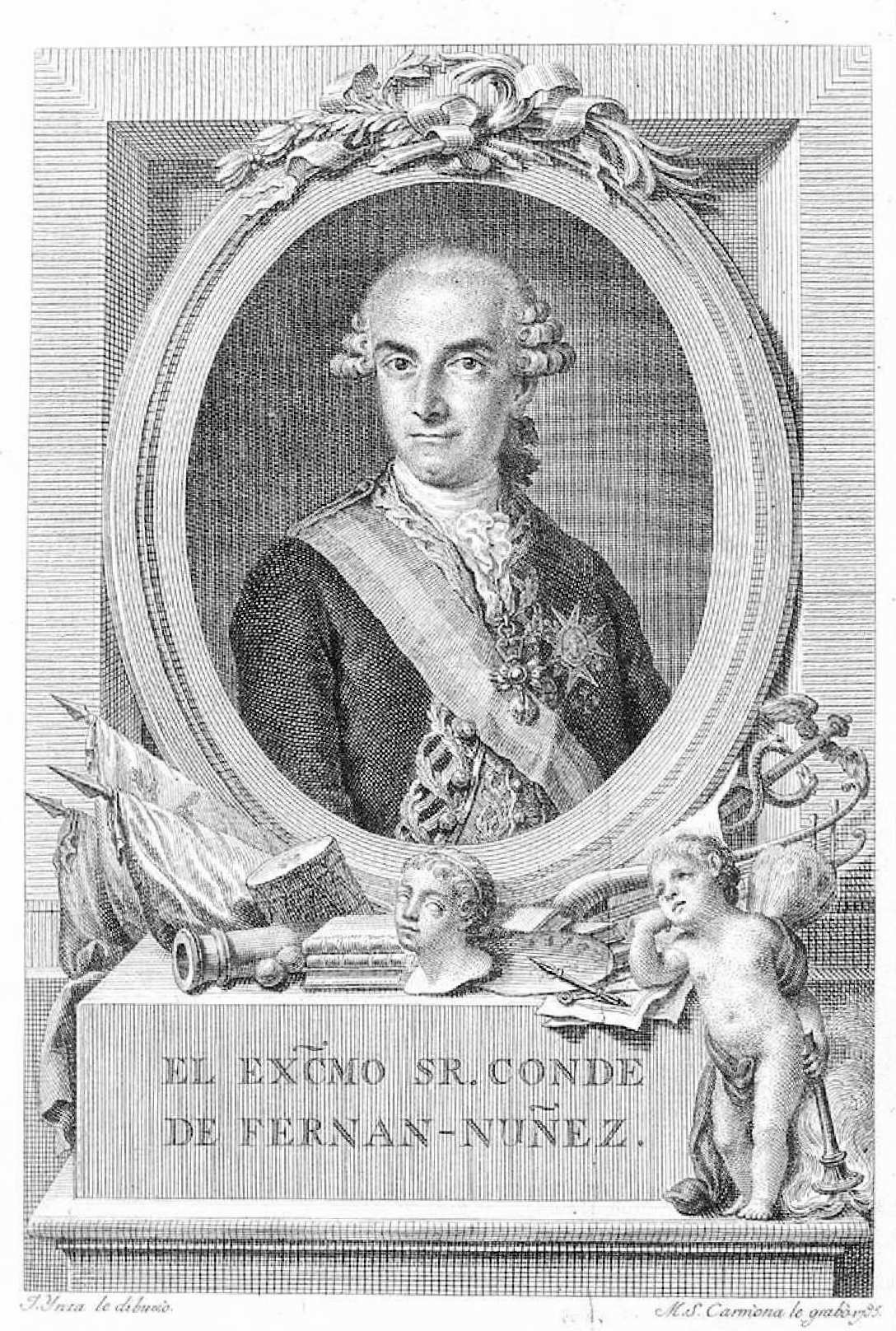
- Portrait engraved by Manuel Salvador Carmona and drawn by Joaquín Inza y Ainsa c.1795, National Library of Spain

Ambassador of Spain to France
- In office 1787–1791

Ambassador of Spain to Portugal
- In office 1778–1788

Personal details
- Born: 11 July 1742 Cartagena, Spain
- Died: 23 February 1795 (aged 52) Madrid, Spain
- Spouse(s): María de la Esclavitud Sarmiento, 5th Countess of Castel Moncayo (m. 1778)
- Children: 9, including Carlos Gutiérrez de los Ríos
- Occupation: Soldier; Diplomat

Military service
- Allegiance: Spain
- Years of service: 1752–1778
- Rank: Captain General
- Battles/wars: Fantastic War; Spanish–Algerian war; Invasion of Algiers

Carlos José Gutiérrez de los Ríos y Rohan-Chabot, 6th Count of Fernán Núñez (11 July 1742 – 23 February 1795) was a Spanish soldier and Diplomat whose military career spanned over two decades. From a noble family, after his military career he served in several diplomatic capacities including Ambassador to Portugal from 1778 to 1788 and Ambassador to France from 1787 to 1791.

== Early life and ancestry ==
He was the son of José Diego Gutiérrez de los Ríos y Zapata, 5th Count of Fernán Núñez and Charlotte Felicité de Rohan-Chabot. His father had served as Captain general of the galleys of Spain. His mother was the granddaughter of Louis, Duke of Rohan and thus, through his matrilineal line, he was a descendant of Charles VII of France, Henry III of England and various other monarchs. He was born on 11 July 1742 in Cartagena.

== Career ==
=== Military ===
After both of his parents had died, King Ferdinand VI took him under his protection and paid for his studies at the Royal Seminary of Nobles in Madrid.

On 18 May 1752, he entered as a cadet in the Regiment of Royal Spanish Infantry Guards. He became standard-bearer on 18 April and 2nd Lieutenant on 15 May 1760. He became 1st Lieutenant on 22 August 1761 and in 1762 served in the Fantastic War where he was sent to Madrid to tell Charles III of the capture of Almeida. He was appointed Colonel on 6 September 1762 and was later given charge of the Castile Infantry Regiment No. 1. In 1766, he exposed his life for the King, and so on 15 July 1767 he was promoted to Infantry Brigadier.

In 1772, he was authorised to travel across Europe to complete his military preparation. He firstly went to Italy, then Vienna, and went to Silesia. He carried out military manoeuvres in Prussia in the presence of Frederick II. After going to Warsaw, in 1773 he returned to France where he met his maternal relatives. In the same year he went to England before returning to France in 1775. Although he had planned for further travelling, after hearing of the Spanish preparations against the Barbary, he thought that he should return to the army and serve the King.

He participated in the failed Invasion of Algiers in 1775, in which he saw several of his comrades-at-arms die next to him. On 15 February 1776, he was promoted to field marshal. He returned to the position of Colonel of the King's Inmemorial Regiment and was awarded the Grand Cross of Charles III. His military career ended following the beginning of his diplomatic career.

=== Diplomat and death ===
On 26 November 1778, he was appointed the Ambassador of Spain to Portugal. He was appointed Councillor of State on 25 August 1785. He was later appointed Ambassador to the United Kingdom however he did not end up taking the position and instead on 6 March 1787 was appointed Ambassador to France, a position he remained in until 1791.

He died on 23 February 1795 in Madrid, at the age of 52.

== Family ==
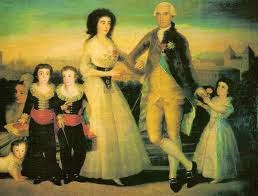
6th Count of Fernán Núñez along with his wife and children, painting by Goya

He married María de la Esclavitud Sarmiento, 5th Countess of Castel Moncayo on 23 November 1798. They had seven children including:

- Carlos Gutiérrez de los Ríos (1779-1822)
- Escolástica Gutiérrez de los Ríos y Sarmiento de Sotomayor (1783-1845), firstly married to José Miguel de la Cueva, 14th Duke of Alburquerque.
- Bruna Gutiérrez de los Ríos and Sarmiento de Sotomayor, married to Rafael Fernández de Córdoba y Argote, Count of Menado Alto.

He also had two children outside of his marriage:

- Ángel Gutiérrez de los Ríos (b. 1771)
- Camilo Gutiérrez de los Ríos (1772-1840) legitimized on February 23, 1795, son of the actress Gertrude Marucci.
