= Gonzalo Fernández de Córdoba, 9th Duke of Arión =

Spanish sailor

The Duke of Arión
Personal information
- Full name: Gonzalo Fernández de Córdoba y Larios, 9th Duke of Arión
- Born: 14 February 1934 Málaga, Spain
- Died: 12 August 2013 (aged 79) Madrid, Spain

Sport
- Sport: Sailing
Medal record
Representing Spain
Mediterranean Games
Bronze medal – third place	1955 Barcelona	Snipe class

Gonzalo Fernández de Córdoba y Larios, 9th Duke of Arión, GE (14 February 1934 – 12 August 2013) was a Spanish sailor. He competed at the 1960 Summer Olympics, the 1968 Summer Olympics and the 1972 Summer Olympics. He was the flag bearer for Spain in the opening ceremony of the 1968 Summer Olympics.

== See also ==
- Duke of Arión
