= Casasola de Arión =

Village in Valladolid, Castile-Leon, Spain

Coordinates: 41°35′N 5°14′W

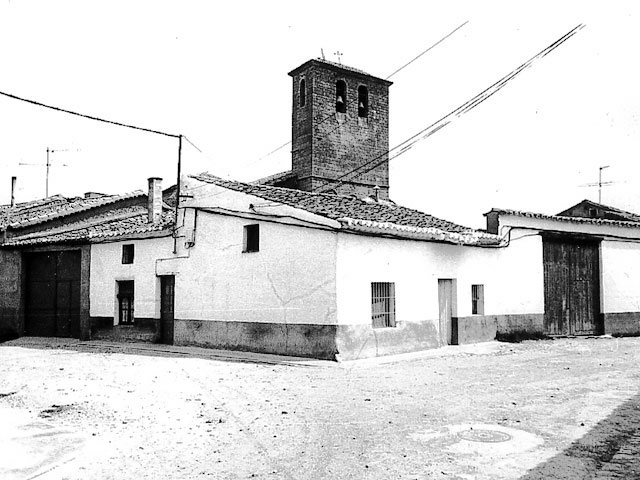

Casasola de Arión is a village in Valladolid, Castile-Leon, Spain. The municipality covers an area of 27.65 square kilometres (10.68 sq mi) and as of 2011 had a population of 314 people.
