= El Guardián =

Magazine

El Guardián is a magazine published in Argentina. The magazine came to international attention in 2011 when a staff writer was dismissed for writing grossly violent and misogynist content.
