= Duke of Arión =

Dukedom of Spain

Dukedom of Arión
- Creation date: 20 September 1725
- Created by: Philip V
- Peerage: Peerage of Spain
- First holder: Baltasar de Zúñiga y Guzmán, 1st Duke of Arión
- Present holder: Joaquín Fernández de Córdoba y Hohenlohe-Langenburg, 10th Duke of Arión
- Subsidiary titles: Marquess of Malpica, Marquess of Povar, Marquess of Valero, Count of Berantevilla.
- Former seat: Palacio del Duque de Arión

Duke of Arión (Spanish: Duque de Arión) is an hereditary title in the Peerage of Spain accompanied by the dignity of Grandee, granted in 1725 by Philip V to Baltasar de Zúñiga, viceroy of New Spain.

The title makes reference to the town of Casasola de Arión, in the Province of Valladolid.

== Dukes of Arión (1725) ==
- Baltasar de Zúñiga, 1st Duke of Arión (1658–1727)
- Manuela de Zúñiga y Guzmán, 2nd Duchess of Arión (b. 1640), eldest daughter of Juan Manuel de Zúñiga-Sotomayor y Mendoza, father of the 1st Duke
- Ignacio Pimentel y Borja, 3rd Duke of Arión (1706–1763), eldest son of Antonio Pimentel y Zúñiga, eldest son of the 2nd Duchess
- Martín Fernández de Velasco, 4th Duke of Arión (1729–1776), eldest son of Manuela Pimentel y Zúñiga, eldest daughter of the 2nd Duchess
- María Teresa Pacheco y Fernández de Velasco, 5th Duchess of Arión (1765–1828), eldest daughter of María de la Portería Fernández de Velasco, granddaughter of the 2nd Duchess
- Joaquín Fernández de Córdoba y Pacheco, 6th Duke of Arión (1787–1871), eldest son of the 5th Duchess
- Fernando Fernández de Córdoba y Álvarez de las Asturias Bohorques, 7th Duke of Arión (1845–1891), eldest son of the 10th Marquess of Povar, eldest son of the 6th Duke
- Joaquín Fernández de Córdoba y Osma, 8th Duke of Arión (1870–1957), eldest son of the 7th Duke
- Gonzalo Fernández de Córdoba y Larios, 9th Duke of Arión (1934–2013), only son of the 13th Marquess of Pomar, eldest son of the 8th Duke
- Joaquín Fernández de Córdoba y Hohenlohe-Langenburg, 10th Duke of Arión (b. 1961), eldest son of the 9th Duke

== See also ==
- List of dukes in the peerage of Spain
- List of current grandees of Spain

== Bibliography ==
- Hidalgos de España, Real Asociación de (2018). Elenco de Grandezas y Títulos Nobiliarios Españoles. Ediciones Hidalguía. ISBN 978-84-94841-02-6.
