= Fernán Núñez =

- Municipality
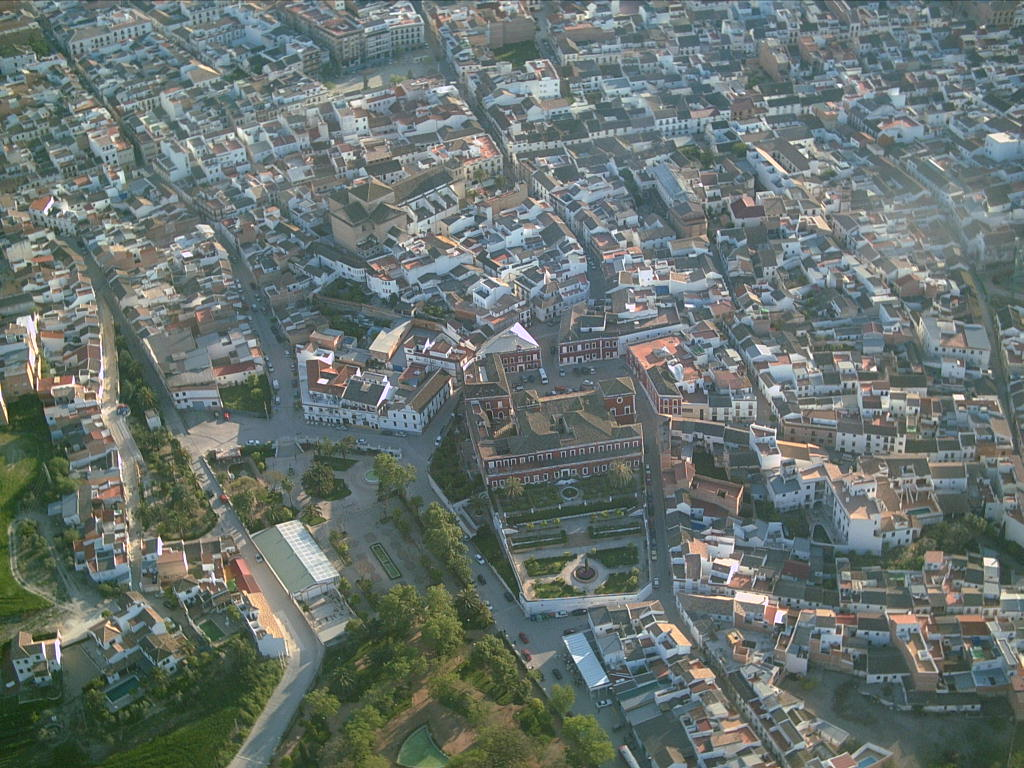
- Aerial view of Fernán Núñez

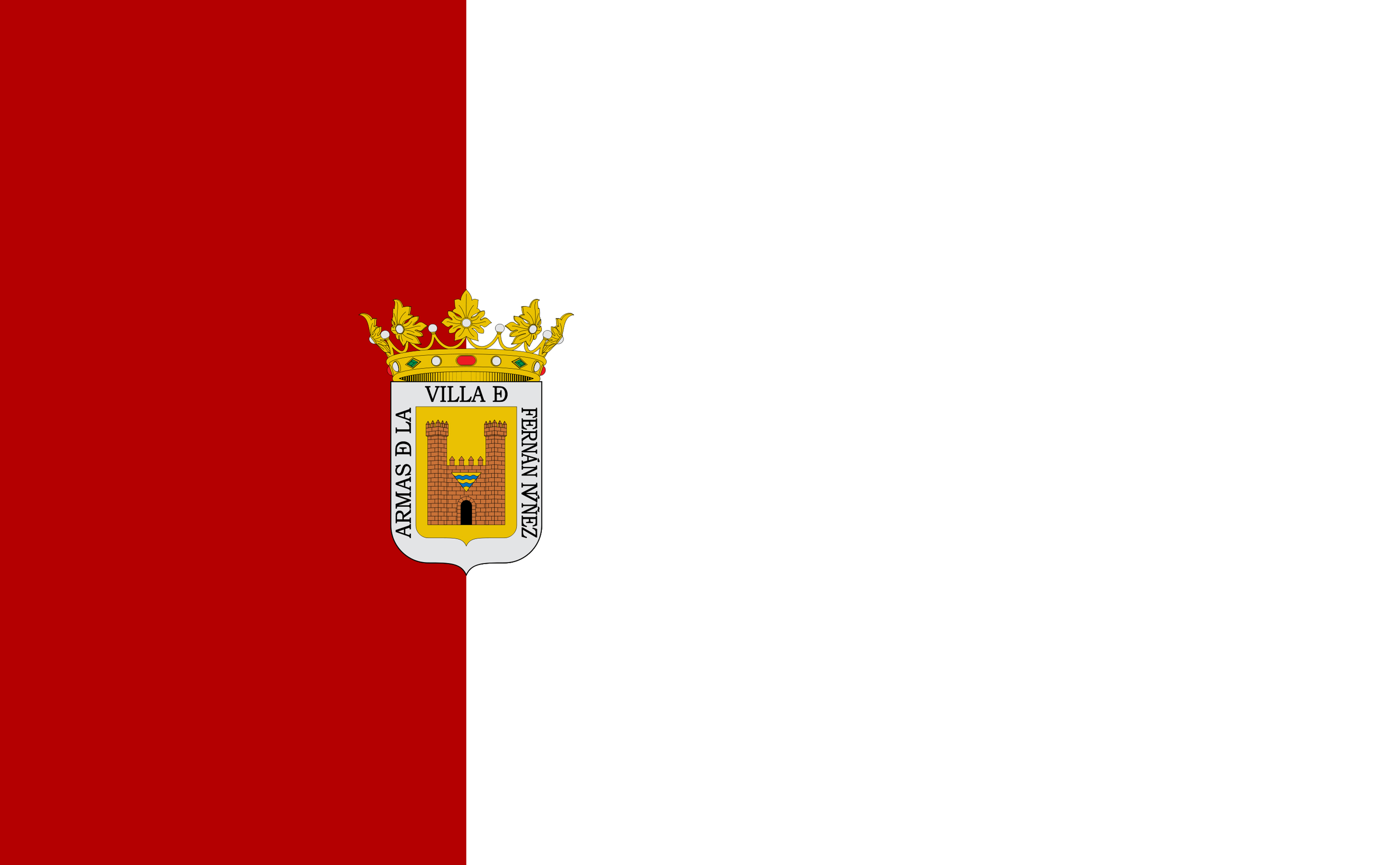
- Flag Seal

- Location in Spain
- Coordinates: 37°40′N 4°43′W
- Country: Spain
- Autonomous community: Andalusia
- Province: Córdoba

Area
  - Total: 30 km^{2} (12 sq mi)
- Elevation: 314 m (1,030 ft)

Population (2025-01-01)
  - Total: 9,670
  - Density: 320/km^{2} (830/sq mi)
- Time zone: UTC+1 (CET)
  - Summer (DST): UTC+2 (CEST)
- Website: www.fernannunez.es

Fernán-Núñez is a municipality in the province of Córdoba, Spain. It is the host of the annual Caños Dorados Prize.

== See also ==
- List of municipalities in Córdoba
