= Julio Iglesias Jr. =

Spanish-Filipino singer

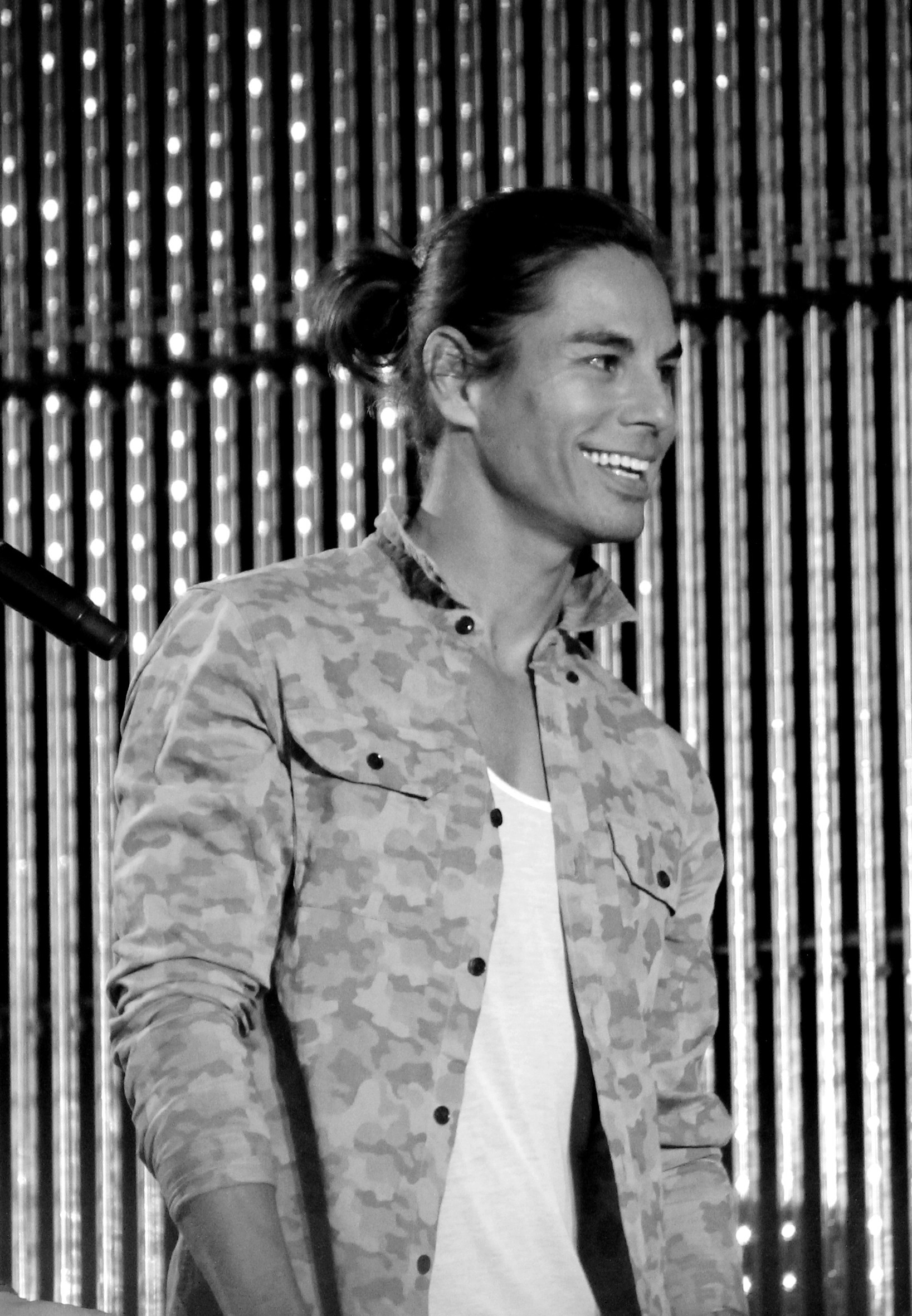
- Iglesias in 2014

Background information
- Born: Julio José Iglesias Preysler; 25 February 1973 (age 53); Madrid, Spain
- Genre: Pop
- Occupations: Singer, model
- Years active: 1999–present
- Label: EMI
- Spouse: Charisse Verhaert (m. 2012; sep. 2020)

Julio Iglesias Jr. (born Julio José Iglesias Preysler; 25 February 1973) is a Spanish singer-songwriter.

== Early life and education ==
Iglesias was born Julio José Iglesias Preysler in Madrid, Spain, the son of Spanish singer Julio Iglesias and Spanish-Filipina socialite Isabel Preysler. He is the younger brother of Chabeli Iglesias and the older brother of Enrique Iglesias. His parents divorced in 1979. Iglesias and his siblings moved to Miami to live with their father. Iglesias attended Menlo College in Atherton, California. He won a chance to participate in NBC's Out of the Blue and he worked for the Travel Channel, where he hosted a travel show that took him to Latin America.

== Career ==
Iglesias first got into show business as a model. His manager negotiated an exclusive male modeling agreement with Joey Hunter, president of the male model division at Ford Models in New York. It was through Hunter that Iglesias was discovered by photographer Bruce Weber. He went on to campaign for Versace. Shortly after, Iglesias signed on with publicity executive Ruben Malaret who began a press campaign to further Iglesias' exposure to the English speaking entertainment industry. Some of his notable accomplishments was his participation on Oprah Winfrey's talk show, being featured in an advertisement for Gap, and modeling for designer John Bartlett VII on Sixth Fashion Show.

He was offered two soap opera jobs, one at Televisa and one in the ABC soap opera All My Children. Iglesias also received an offer from the producers of the Broadway show Grease to star as Danny, but decided to turn down these job offers to focus on his music. Iglesias signed a recording agreement with Epic Records and traveled to Miami to record his first album, Under My Eyes, with Rodolfo Castillo. Released in 1999, the recording of this album took them to New York City and Los Angeles; two songs released from this English language album are "One More Chance" and "Under My Eyes". Among promotional appearances for the album, Iglesias performed "One More Chance" at the Miss Universe 1999 pageant and opened for Cher on her tour of North America. The album failed to gain success in the United States and soon after Iglesias departed from Epic Records.

Iglesias' second album, Tercera Dimension, was released in 2003 on the Warner Music Group and featured Spanish pop rock songs with the singles "Los Demas" and "Dejame Volar". Both albums received public interest from the Hispanic media in the United States but attained minority success.

He worked for ¡Hola! magazine, appearing in several photoshoots. More recently he has taken part in a series in Spain called Club de Flo, in which Spanish politicians and celebrities have to present a comedy routine. The show was unsuccessful and cancelled after several episodes. He has moved back to Spain and is living with his mother Isabel Preysler. He appeared on the Spanish version of Dancing with the Stars called ¡Mira quien baila! but was voted out in the thirteenth week. He played the lead role in a drama film entitled The Music of You directed by Lloyd DeSouza.

In 2008, Iglesias was the winner of the first season of CMT reality television show Gone Country, in which artists from other genres of music lived together in a house in Nashville and competed to win a country music contract. His single "The Way I Want You" was released to country radio on 10 March 2008 and was produced by Gone Country host John Rich. Iglesias also appeared on the ABC TV show The Superstars. He was partnered with soccer player Brandi Chastain and finished in fourth place in the competition.

In 2014, he joined with artists Nuno Resende and Damien Sargue for the compilation album Latin Lovers.

In 2015, he performed a concert (complete show) for the first time with his father Julio Iglesias in a tour in Romania, on 22 May at Sala Polivalentă in Cluj-Napoca and 2 July at Sala Palatului in the capital Bucharest.

== Personal life ==
Iglesias is a Catholic and descendant of the religious Filipino-Spanish clan Arrastia from the Arrastia family of Lubao, Pampanga, in the Philippines.

In October 1999, he legally changed his name from Julio José Iglesias to Julio Iglesias Jr.

In May 2011, Iglesias became engaged to Belgian model Charisse Verhaert (born 1982) after 7 years of dating. The religious wedding took place on 3 November 2012 in Aldea del Fresno, Spain. In August 2020, a petition for divorce was filed in the Miami Court.

From October 2022 to July 2023, Iglesias was in a relationship with Brazilian model Vivi Di Domenico who is 20 years his junior. In August 2023, he revealed that he is dating Cuban-Italian model Ariadna Romero.

== Discography ==
=== Albums ===
List of albums, with selected details
Title	Details
Under My Eyes	Released: 1999; Format: CD, Cassette; Label: Epic
Tercera Dimensión	Released: 2003; Format: CD; Label: Warner Music Latina
Por la Mitad	Released: 2008; Format: CD; Label: Capitol

=== Singles ===
List of singles, with selected chart positions
Title	Year	Peak chart positions	Album
Title	Year	AUS	Album
"One More Chance"	1999	46	Under My Eyes
"Nothing Else"	1999	—	Under My Eyes
"Por la Mitad"	2008	—	Por la Mitad
"The Way I Want You"	2008	—	Por la Mitad
"Geronimo"	2012	—	Single only
"My Love – A Piece of My Love" (featuring Abel the Kid and Snoop Dogg)	2013	—	Single only
"Vous les femmes"	2014	—	Latin Lovers
"La camisa negra"	2014	—	Latin Lovers
"Smile" (featuring Abel the Kid)	2014	—	Singles only
"Amo di te" (featuring Anamor)	2014	—	Singles only
"I Wonder" (featuring Abel the Kid and Rasel)	2014	—	Singles only
