= Tamara Falcó =

Spanish aristocrat (born 1981)

The Most Illustrious Tamara Falcó 6th Marchioness of Griñón
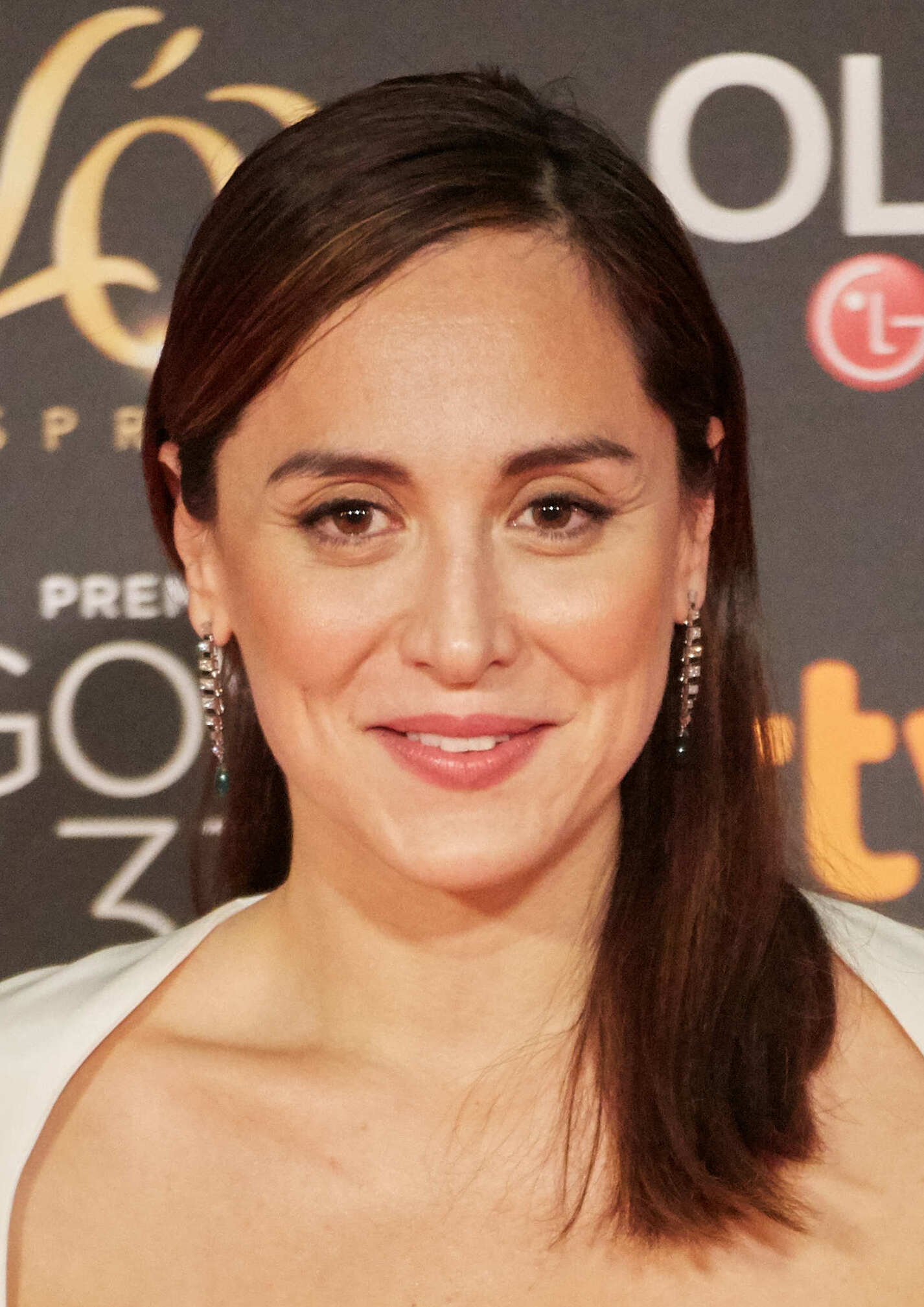
- Pictured in 2019
- Full name: Tamara Isabel Falcó Preysler
- Born: 20 November 1981 (age 44); Madrid, Spain
- Spouse: Íñigo Andrés Onieva Molas (m. 2023)
- Heir presumptive: Duarte Falcó y de la Cierva (half-brother)
- Father: Carlos Falcó y Fernández de Córdoba, 12th Marquess of Castel-Moncayo
- Mother: María Isabel Preysler Arrastia

Tamara Isabel Falcó Preysler, 6th Marchioness of Griñón (born 20 November 1981), is a Spanish aristocrat, socialite and television personality. She is the daughter of Carlos Falcó, 12th Marquess of Castel-Moncayo, and Spanish-Filipina socialite Isabel Preysler. She was a co-host on the television show El Hormiguero.

== Early life and education ==
Tamara Isabel Falcó Preysler was born on 20 November 1981 in Madrid, Spain, as the only child from the marriage of Carlos Falcó y Fernández de Córdoba and María Isabel Preysler Arrastia. Her parents wed in 1980, both for the second time. Her parents separated in 1985, with both also remarrying after. From her parents' other marriages, she has eight half-siblings, including Manolo, 13th Marquess of Castel-Moncayo, Alejandra, 13th Marchioness of Mirabel, and singer Enrique Iglesias.

She attended Lake Forest College in Lake Forest, Illinois, and majored in communication. After an internship at Inditex, she attended Istituto Marangoni in Milan to study fashion. She also holds a Masters in Visual Merchandising degree from the University of Navarra.

== Career ==
In 2013, she starred in her own reality television series lady Tamara for one season. Since then, she has been featured on various television series as guest appearances.

In 2019, she competed and eventually won the fourth season of the competitive reality cooking show MasterChef Celebrity España. She won in the finale against actor Félix Gómez and she donated the €75,000 cash prize to Mensajeros de la Paz. After winning the show, she continued her television work with food and co-presented Cocina al punto con Peña y Tamara, with renowned chef Javier García Peña. She pursued formal culinary training at Le Cordon Bleu in Madrid, Spain, and she finished her studies in June 2021.

In September 2020, she joined the cast of the Spanish variety talk show El Hormiguero as a co-presenter in its round table discussion portion, along with Pablo Motos, Juan del Val, Cristina Pardo and Nuria Roca. In January 2021, she joined the talent competition show El Desafío as a judge.

She released a cookbook featuring her maternal grandmother's recipes, Las recetas de casa de mi madre, in October 2021.

She serves as a brand ambassador for OPI Products Spain. In fall 2023, she introduced a 5-piece nail polish set called the Tamara Falcó Perfumery Collection in collaboration with the brand.

In the summer of 2024, she became a judge on the tenth season of Got Talent España, taking over the role from singer and actress Edurne.

In June 2024, she launched a new clothing collection, TFP by Tamara Falcó, alongside Pedro del Hierro. The collection was inspired by her honeymoon to the African savannah and the islands of French Polynesia.

== Personal life ==
She has publicly stated that she is a practicing Roman Catholic and that she was influenced by the daily attendance of mass by her maternal grandmother, Beatriz Arrastia Reinares. She is the baptismal godmother of her nephew Miguel Verdasco Boyer, son of her maternal younger half-sister, Ana Boyer Preysler, with Spanish professional tennis player Fernando Verdasco Carmona.

After her father, the 12th Marquess of Castel-Moncayo, died in March 2020 due to complications from COVID-19, she succeeded to his junior title (the Marquessate of Griñón) according to his will.

In November 2020, she began a romantic relationship with Spanish hospitality executive Íñigo Andrés Onieva Molas. On 8 July 2023, the couple married in a Catholic ceremony in Spain. The wedding was covered extensively by ¡Hola! magazine.

== Bibliography ==
- Falcó, Tamara (13 October 2021). Las recetas de casa de mi madre (in European Spanish). Espasa. ISBN 978-84-670-6418-6.

== Filmography ==
=== Television ===
Year	Series	Channel
2013	We Love Tamara	Cosmopolitan TV
2016	Soy Noticia	Cuatro
2018	Mi casa es la tuya	Telecinco
2018	Volverte a ver	Telecinco
2019	MasterChef Celebrity España	La 1
2020	Cocina al punto con Peña y Tamara	La 1
2020 – present	El Hormiguero	Antena 3
2021	El Desafío	Antena 3
2024	Got Talent España	Telecinco
