= The Vampire Diaries season 8 =

The Vampire Diaries
- Season 8
- Season 8 DVD cover
- Showrunners: Kevin Williamson; Julie Plec
- Starring: Paul Wesley; Ian Somerhalder; Kat Graham; Candice King; Zach Roerig; Matt Davis; Michael Malarkey
- No. of episodes: 16

Release
- Original network: The CW
- Original release: October 21, 2016 – March 10, 2017

Season chronology
- ← Previous; Season 7

The Vampire Diaries, an American supernatural drama, was renewed for an eighth and final season by The CW on March 11, 2016. On July 23, 2016, The CW announced that the upcoming season would be the series' last and would consist of 16 episodes. The season premiered on October 21, 2016, and concluded on March 10, 2017.

== Cast ==
=== Main ===
- Paul Wesley as Stefan Salvatore
- Ian Somerhalder as Damon Salvatore
- Kat Graham as Bonnie Bennett
- Candice King as Caroline Forbes
- Zach Roerig as Matt Donovan
- Matt Davis as Alaric Saltzman
- Michael Malarkey as Enzo St. John

=== Recurring ===
- Kristen Gutoskie as Seline
- Demetrius Bridges as Dorian Williams
- Allison Scagliotti as Georgie Dowling
- Nathalie Kelley as Sybil
- Lily Rose Mumford as Josie Saltzman
- Tierney Mumford as Lizzie Saltzman
- Wolé Parks as Cade
- Joel Gretsch as Peter Maxwell
- Sammi Hanratty as Violet Fell
- Kayla Ewell as Vicki Donovan
- Reece Odum as Karen

=== Special guest ===
- Michael Trevino as Tyler Lockwood
- Chris Wood as Kai Parker

=== Special appearance ===
- Steven R. McQueen as Jeremy Gilbert
- Sara Canning as Jenna Sommers
- Marguerite MacIntyre as Liz Forbes
- David Anders as John Gilbert
- Jodi Lyn O'Keefe as Jo Laughlin
- Jasmine Guy as Sheila Bennett
- Arielle Kebbel as Lexi Branson
- Jaz Sinclair as Beatrice Bennett
- Natashia Williams as Lucy Bennett

=== Guest ===
- Aisha Duran as Virginia St. John
- Tristin Mays as Sarah Nelson
- Alexandra Chando as Tara
- Evan Gamble as Henry Wattles
- Persia White as Abby Bennett Wilson
- Melinda Clarke as Kelly Donovan
- Nina Dobrev as Katherine Pierce / Elena Gilbert

== Episodes ==
No. overall	No. in season	Title	Directed by	Written by	Original release date	Prod. code	U.S. viewers (millions)
156	1	"Hello, Brother"	Michael A. Allowitz	Julie Plec & Kevin Williamson	October 21, 2016	T27.13301	0.98
A humanity-less Damon and Enzo are on a killing spree as per the vault monster's orders. Based on fresh leads, Stefan and Bonnie visit the slaughterhouse that Damon and Enzo now call home and try talking sense into them, but the duo are in no way even close to disobeying the vault monster. Alaric and his interns manage to delve deeper into the vault cave and discover ancient remains that have distinct Greek roots. Caroline has her hands full with finding clues and taking care of the kids along with the new nanny, Seline. On another side, Virginia St. John had escaped and gone straight for Seline. Caroline was right on time to save her kids, Seline and grill Virginia on spilling the beans about the vault monster but it was of no use, as Virginia bled to death. Bonnie was reminiscing about her and Enzo when she, along with Alaric, connected a similarity between a certain Greek story Enzo used to tell her and his current method of killing his victims. They all point towards Sirens or The Messengers of The Devil – a Greek myth according to which Fauns use mind control to lure their victims to their death. As the episode draws to a close, Damon and Enzo look on as the vault monster rises from the death pool with death gleaming in her eyes.
157	2	"Today Will Be Different"	Pascal Verschooris	Melinda Hsu Taylor	October 28, 2016	T27.13302	0.90
The siren, Sybil cannot figure out why Enzo won't fully submit to her and in an attempt to get in his head and find out what's holding him back, she learns about Sarah Salvatore; the last living Salvatore apart from Damon and Stefan. Sybil tasks Damon, who never knew about Sarah, to kill her. A list of victims named Sarah Nelson ("Nelson" being Sarah's assumed surname) appears and Stefan, Caroline, and Bonnie go to the real Sarah's apartment to protect her from Damon and Enzo, the former of who is knocked out by Sarah with vervain upon their arrival. Enzo tells Bonnie they will both be in danger if he doesn't return to Sybil so Bonnie knocks him out and attempts to escape. Eventually, she must let him go but the two share a passionate kiss and he tells her he will never stop fighting for her. At Sarah's apartment, Damon attempts to kill her but Stefan tells him who she is and begs him to let her go for Elena. Damon lets her go, but Sybil shows up at that moment and kills Sarah. She is upset that Damon is tied to Elena so she changes his memories of Elena to her. Now fully submitted to Sybil, Damon walks out with her. When Enzo returns to Sybil, she gets in his head and sees his kiss with Bonnie. Alaric and his co-worker Georgie discover an artifact with a symbol that Georgie has tattooed on herself that she saw in a hellish state of mind after a near-death experience. In the end, Caroline moves into the Salvatore residence with Stefan, where she discovers he has made a room for her and Alaric's kids to stay and in the dresser drawer, an engagement ring. After making Stefan officially pop the question, Caroline accepts his proposal.
158	3	"You Decided That I Was Worth Saving"	Michael Karasick	Chad Fiveash & James Stoteraux	November 4, 2016	T27.13303	0.94
Sybil realizes that both Damon and Enzo are tied to Bonnie and that she is main cause of whatever unwillingness to submit to her that either of them has left. Bonnie wants to put the search on Damon and Enzo on hold to help Caroline shop for a wedding dress but their day is ruined when Damon attacks. Caroline manages to save Bonnie but Sybil launches a new plan in which she forces Enzo and Damon to fight to death. Sybil introduces herself to Bonnie and Caroline and she tells Bonnie that she must choose between the two men. Bonnie, Caroline, and Stefan manage a head start to Damon and Enzo and try to keep the two from killing each other. However Damon eventually gains the upper hand just as Sybil arrives and Bonnie tells her that she chooses Enzo. However, Enzo being the more stubborn of the two, Sybil decides to instead force Enzo to shut off his humanity with Bonnie's life as a threat; when Enzo's humanity is off, Sybil sends Damon to kill Bonnie anyway and Alaric saves her last second and the ensuing supernatural violence is witnessed by Georgie. Bonnie takes Enzo back to their cabin to work on restoring his humanity. Stefan, Alaric, and Caroline, have Sybil captured now with Damon out to fulfill her mysterious plans.
159	4	"An Eternity of Misery"	Rob Hardy	Brett Matthews & Neil Reynolds	November 11, 2016	T27.13304	1.00
More than two thousand years ago, Sybil asks her "sister", fellow siren, to tell her a happy story. Her sister tells her about Arcadius "Cade", a man with psychic abilities that was killed for what he was. In his last breath, he used his powers to create a new world where his soul traveled upon his burning at the stake. In the present, Sybil tells Stefan that her boss wants him to know the full story of her and her sister. Sybil's sister Seline, posing as the nanny of Alaric's kids, forces Georgie to trap Alaric in the vault and makes Georgie look like the other siren. Sybil's boss, revealed to be Cade who gave Seline and Sybil their immortality, tortures the souls of humans, considering them to be the most evil in the world. Seline kills Georgie and Georgie's soul is sucked into what appears to be Hell, where Cade will torture her soul while Seline eats her body. Damon goes after an object that he is subconsciously aware that Sybil wants; he ends up attacking and nearly killing a man, who is revealed as Matt Donovan's father. Matt saves his father from Damon, afterward telling him about the existence of vampires. Damon tells Matt that he killed Tyler Lockwood. Matt finds Tyler's body, confirming Damon killed him.
160	5	"Coming Home Was a Mistake"	James Thompson	Celine Geiger	November 18, 2016	T27.13305	0.92
Matt informs the others of Tyler's death and when he, Caroline, Stefan, and Alaric go to bury him, they are met by Damon. Matt learns that before Tyler died, he was looking for a siren named Seline with the now deceased Virginia. Seline babysits the twins on her day off and takes them to the carnival. They win a goldfish, which is dead, so Seline decides to explain the process of burial to the twins and tells them about Cade. Damon goes to Sybil wanting to be free of her mind control, which she denies him and is upset that he apparently hadn't fully submitted to her. Damon meets Stefan at the carnival where he is knocked out by Caroline. Stefan puts Damon in his coffin to hide until they can defeat the sirens. When Georgie's remain are discovered, the Armory is left alone and Sybil escapes, taking the tuning fork with her and then frees Damon from the coffin, who has decided not to feel and fully submit to her. Bonnie uses a magical candle from the Armory to keep Enzo inside the cabin and then lights the cabin aflame to use her impending to death to forcibly switch Enzo's humanity back on. It works and Enzo and Bonnie meet up with the others at the carnival to say goodbye to Tyler. Caroline shows Matt pictures of the girls on her phone and Matt recognizes Seline as the siren. Alaric and Caroline rush to the house only to find Seline and the twins gone with a kids-drawing of Lizzie, Josie, Seline, and Cade.
161	6	"Detoured on Some Random Backwoods Path to Hell"	Paul Wesley	Alan McElroy	December 2, 2016	T27.13306	1.05
Damon and Sybil meet up with Seline and the twins at a diner. Seline reveals her plan to offer up Lizzie and Josie to Cade for the freedom of her and Sybil's souls. Alaric and Caroline desperately search for their daughters. Sybil decides to punish Enzo for escaping her by singing to him over the phone, thus putting herself in his subconscious where she tortures him. Stefan uses the predicament to speak to Sybil through Enzo to try and find Lizzie and Josie. Damon, Sybil, Seline, Lizzie and Josie arrive at a motel where they use magic to summon Cade. Sybil tells Stefan where she is on the condition he comes alone and promises him an offer he cannot refuse. At the motel, Cade is at first interested in Seline's offer to have the twins become his slaves in about a decade or so until Sybil gives Cade her own offer of the Salvatore brothers instead. Stefan tells Caroline that he offered up his soul and that he was granted twenty-four more hours to be with her. Bonnie and Enzo may finally be free of Sybil, who leaves his subconscious after her meeting with Cade. Alaric and Matt attack Damon, because of the former's belief that it is necessary to keep his kids safe and Alaric stakes him in the heart.
162	7	"The Next Time I Hurt Somebody, It Could Be You"	Tanya Hamilton	Shukree Hassan Tilghman	December 9, 2016	T27.13307	0.98
On the night of Christmas Eve 1917, the ripper Stefan drinks blood from a camp full of people. In the present, Stefan is determined to make the most out of his final day with Caroline over a Christmas Eve dinner. Unfortunately, Damon and Sybil crash the party and Damon stakes Stefan sending him to a meeting with Cade. Cade reveals that on that Christmas Eve a century ago, Seline had witnessed the murder Stefan inflicted on the camp of people and wanted to trade places with him, only to realize he wasn't evil and she erased his memory of their meeting and his slaughter of the camp. However, Cade had decided way back then that Stefan was a perfect servant for him. Distraught over the ruined Christmas festivities, Caroline gives Damon a present that could alter his decision to kill someone that night. Bonnie and Enzo find Seline and ask her for the tuning fork to which she agrees to give them on the condition that she can remove the psychic powers she had planted inside of Lizzie and Josie, hoping to redeem herself and not go to hell when she dies. When Damon and Sybil leave the party, Damon gives her Caroline's present, not having known what it was. When he sees it is Elena's old necklace, he rips out Sybil's heart and leaves her to die. Stefan proposes a deal to Cade to turn off his humanity, so that he can feed Cade souls more rapidly in exchange for Cade shortening his contract to serving him for only a year as opposed to eternity. Cade agrees to the deal but makes it apparent that he doubts Stefan will want to leave him after serving him for a year. Caroline spends her last few hours with her daughters before Alaric takes them away to be safe and it is discovered that Bonnie and the twins also all receive splitting headaches when the tuning fork is used around them. In the end, Damon and Stefan drive out of Mystic Falls and Stefan turns off his humanity.
163	8	"We Have History Together"	Ian Somerhalder	Matthew D'Ambrosio	January 13, 2017	T27.13308	0.95
Stefan decides that he wants Tara, a young doctor, to be Cade's next meal. In his plot to find the darkness within her, he knocks up Damon on vervain and keeps him on bed rest in the hospital. Stefan learns that Tara's parents were killed by a drunk driver and compels her into believing that Damon was the driver in an attempt to convince her to kill Damon. She eventually gives into her darkness so Stefan takes her to be fed on by Cade. In Mystic Falls, Caroline's job sends her to her old high school where she discovers Sybil has used her siren ability to get herself a job as a teacher. Sybil uses her powers to make the class tie themselves to trees with one remaining student to set them ablaze unless Caroline retrieves an old bell for her for a mysterious reason. Matt is annoyed with his father for having abandon him and even more so when he discovers that he is the one that got rid of the bell by throwing it in the lake under Wickery Bridge, which is revealed to be because Matt's family actually founded the town and made the bell, but it was taken over by the founding family. It is then revealed that the bell was discovered in 2009, after Elena's parents' car went into the lake and is now in Caroline's garage; Caroline and Sybil go to retrieve it but Seline had taken it, leaving a note for Sybil to taunt her. Damon can't seem to rid himself of Elena's necklace, even going after it after throwing it out the car window, showing that he has enough humanity to care about Elena. Sybil also creates doubt inside of Caroline about Stefan coming back from his ripper phase when his contract with Cade is up and even if he does, he could become a ripper again at any time.
164	9	"The Simple Intimacy of the Near Touch"	Geoff Shotz	Neil Reynolds & Penny Cox	January 20, 2017	T27.13309	0.86
Damon has the bell striker so Sybil makes him return to Mystic Falls to give it to her. While Damon does return, he realizes he can tell Sybil no and ultimately denies her the striker and locks her up. Stefan turns Violet into vampire during the Miss Mystic Falls pageant and Caroline comforts her after returning her engagement ring to Stefan. Also, Seline is determined to assemble the bell herself and reveals it can kill sirens and that she wants to kill Sybil as a part of righting her past misdeeds and she teams up with Dorian to do so. Elsewhere, Enzo gives a vial of his blood to Bonnie in the form of a necklace, hoping she'll become a vampire to be with him for eternity. However, with her life tied to Elena's she is unsure of how it would affect her. In the end, Bonnie suggests that Enzo take the cure and Sybil, chained up by Damon, uses her powers to return Damon's humanity to him, flooding him with guilt from his recent actions under the siren's control.
165	10	"Nostalgia's a Bitch"	Kellie Cyrus	Brett Matthews	January 27, 2017	T27.13310	0.94
Sybil has put Damon into a catatonic state, forcing Bonnie and Caroline to free her so that she will release him in exchange for the bell. However, Sybil realizes Damon's mind is in an induced hellish state, put there by himself because of his guilt. Bonnie and Caroline go into his subconscious to speak with Damon and tell him they forgive him for everything. Stefan kills Violet and reveals that Cade is requiring more souls so he makes a deal to acquire the bell for Sybil so that Damon will be conscious again and do his share of killing. Afterward, Seline offers another deal, which involves Matt ringing the bell twelve times in order to release hell on earth and kill everyone in Mystic Falls. Stefan compels Matt into doing so and then goes to retrieve Damon after being told that the Damon's need for forgiveness is about him. Once inside Damon's head, Stefan realizes Damon needs to forgive Stefan for turning him into a vampire all those years ago, causing every terrible thing that has happened since. Damon wakes up and Stefan is chained and told by Caroline that she loves him and she will do whatever it takes to restore his humanity. Damon stops Matt at the eleventh ring, which stops hell from burning the town, but allows enough power for Cade to come to the real world. In the final scene, Cade meets Sybil and Seline at a diner, where after telling the sirens that he'll take it from there, lights them on fire.
166	11	"You Made a Choice to Be Good"	Carol Banker	Melinda Hsu Taylor & Celine Geiger	February 3, 2017	T27.13311	0.92
Cade frees Stefan from captivity and sends him on a mission. He then tells Damon that his work isn't cutting it and that by sundown he must either kill one hundred people or Caroline. Bonnie encourages Enzo to complete his bucket list before taking the cure; once complete, they travel to a house she bought in New York where she is secretly keeping Elena. Caroline and Damon scheme to give the cure to Cade so that they can kill him and Bonnie reluctantly agrees to draw Elena's blood and give them the dosage instead of Enzo. Cade later reveals that his mission for Stefan was also to kill a hundred people or Elena. Stefan chose the latter and so Damon races to New York to stop him. Stefan compels Bonnie's realtor to sign the house over to herself and then invite him in so that he can get to Elena. Bonnie draws the blood from Elena and then gives it to Stefan after Stefan arrives at the house and kills Enzo.
167	12	"What Are You?"	Darren Genet	Chad Fiveash & James Stoteraux	February 10, 2017	T27.13312	1.11
Stefan is arrested following his transition back into a human. Caroline manages to compel the police of his innocence but it doesn't erase the guilt inside of him. Bonnie is devastated about Enzo's death and her mother, Abby, comes to her house to console her. The two discover that Enzo is trying to communicate with Bonnie and that when he died, Bonnie opened the door between hell and earth. She tries to pull Enzo from hell but Abby ultimately burns his body, knowing that he would just drag Bonnie down with him. Cade tells Damon that their contract is up because of Stefan no longer being a vampire and tells Damon that he will claim Stefan's soul to take to hell at midnight if Damon doesn't retrieve the Maxwell journal. Matt, Alaric, and Dorian attempt to discover why the journal is important and Matt sees events from 1790 where his ancestor Ethan and Bonnie's ancestor Beatrice created the Maxwell bell and then encountered Seline and Sybil. The sirens forced Ethan to ring the bell twelve times and send hellfire to the town and he killed one hundred people. Beatrice trapped Seline and Sybil in the vault and Ethan wrote how to kill Cade in the Maxwell journal. In the present, Damon takes the journal and gives it to Cade, who burns it. Damon later tells Alaric that he is certain a certain artifact they have is how to kill the devil, having heard Sybil say it once. In the last scene, Damon and Alaric make plans to kill Cade and then Kai mysteriously walks in and says he has a better idea.
168	13	"The Lies Will Catch Up to You"	Tony Solomons	Neil Reynolds	February 17, 2017	T27.13313	0.99
It is revealed that when Matt rang the bell eleven times and Cade came to Mystic Falls, Kai was able to as well, but only halfway, so he enlists Damon and Alaric's help to bring him back fully in exchange for him waking up Elena. Matt and Caroline learn that everyone Stefan ever compelled are now remembering things they've forgotten. This includes Dorian, who abducts Stefan and explains that he now recalls Stefan murdering his family back when Stefan was being forced to work for Klaus. Dorian shoots Stefan, but then regrets it and tries to get him to a hospital. Cade comes to Stefan during an out of body state as a result of him dying and tells Stefan that Caroline would be better off without him. In the hospital, Stefan breaks up with Caroline and tells her that he is leaving Mystic Falls. Bonnie finds out that she has psychic powers and tries to contact Enzo. She does with Cade's help and learns that like when Cade created hell, she created a place where Enzo's spirit now resides. Alaric brings the girls to see Caroline and tells her that they have lost control of their powers. Cade learns Kai escaped from hell and Damon tries to convince him that he can only be fully redeemed and saved from Cade if he brings back Elena. They go to her casket where Kai stabs Damon, tells him that he doesn't believe in redemption, and escapes with Elena while Damon falls to the floor, desiccating.
169	14	"It's Been a Hell of a Ride"	Pascal Verschooris	Brett Matthews & Shukree Hassan Tilghman	February 24, 2017	T27.13314	1.04
Enzo encourages Bonnie to forgive Stefan. Kai gives Elena to Cade and Cade keeps Damon from dying so as to use him to get the dagger that can kill the Devil and deliver it to him in exchange for Elena. Damon keeps Stefan from leaving when telling him that Cade has Elena; they go after Kai, who has the dagger, and get it from him as well as abducting him and trapping him in the Armory. Caroline goes to Kai for help with the twins' uncontrollable siphoning to which Kai reveals that the Armory causes an outburst of witch siphoning powers. He then uses that power to escape and go after the girls. Alaric rings the Maxwell bell to weaken Cade while Stefan goes to kill the Devil; however, Kai calls him and reveals his intentions to kill the twins and so Alaric must deal with that and since he isn't ringing the bell, Cade overpowers Stefan. Eventually, Alaric and Caroline defeat Kai and then Alaric reveals that he wants the two of them to run a school for kids like Lizzie and Josie. Damon meets Cade and Stefan in the cave and Cade tries to force him to choose between the deaths of Elena or Stefan. Damon chooses himself; he kills himself but is rescued by Bonnie who fights Cade for his soul. While Cade and Bonnie's psychic powers are battling, Stefan uses the dagger on Cade and kills him. A psychic blast from Cade's death sends Damon's soul back into his body. Bonnie makes it clear that she hasn't forgiven Stefan, but he tells her that he won't give up on her forgiveness. Stefan also re-proposes to Caroline and she accepts. Bonnie traps Kai in another prison world and he tells her that when Cade died, the person given power over Hell was Katherine; Bonnie relays this information to Damon.
170	15	"We're Planning a June Wedding"	Chris Grismer	Story by : Jen Vestuto & Melissa Marlette; Teleplay by : Melinda Hsu Taylor	March 3, 2017	T27.13315	1.14
Matt's mother, Kelly returns to Mystic Falls claiming to want to be there for Matt, but it is soon revealed that she is working with Katherine and had been residing in Hell after having died two years ago. Damon concocts a plan to lure out Katherine by throwing a last-minute wedding of Stefan and Caroline. Damon and Stefan also construct a dagger made from Katherine's bones to kill her. Bonnie tells Caroline she can't be at the wedding of the man who killed Enzo, but Enzo encourages her to go for her best friend. At the wedding, Kelly slits Peter's throat after a failed attempt to get the dagger from him. Everyone expects Katherine to interrupt the ceremony, but she doesn't, so Stefan and Caroline say their vows and actually get married. During the reception, Bonnie goes with the twins to the Lockwood house; Kelly interrupts Damon's speech and reveals that the Lockwood house is going to catch fire because she started a gas leak. The fire starts with Bonnie and the girls in the house. However, Lizzie and Josie are able to siphon Bonnie's magic to save them and they all use their power to escape with Bonnie having to lose her connection to Enzo in the process. In the end, Kelly reveals that Katherine's plan was to distract them with the house fire while the now resurrected Vicki Donovan returns and begins ringing the Maxwell bell to bring hellfire to Mystic Falls. As the bell rings, Bonnie falls to the ground, nose bleeding, and presumably dying.
171	16	"I Was Feeling Epic"	Julie Plec	Julie Plec & Kevin Williamson	March 10, 2017	T27.13316	1.15
As Stefan and Caroline attempt to revive Bonnie, Bonnie enters the state between life and death and sees Elena. Enzo comes and tells Bonnie that it isn't her time and she returns to her body. Katherine finally reveals herself to the Salvatore brothers and, even though Stefan stabs her with the dagger made from her bones, she comes back to Damon later, revealing that she can leave hell whenever she wants and that Cade had been under her control since her death. Vicki reveals that she wants to die from the hellfire so as not to return to hell, where she has been residing miserably. Vicki will ring the bell every five minutes until the end of the hour. Matt and the police evacuate the town. Alaric, Caroline, and the twins leave Mystic Falls when Bonnie comes up with a plan to use her magic to reverse the hellfire back into hell, destroying it and Katherine. Damon stays with Katherine in the tunnels under the Armory to make sure she is in hell when Bonnie does this; Stefan comes forward to sacrifice himself instead, and Damon refuses. Damon offers to give up his life instead, telling his brother he loves him and tells him to tell Elena he did it for her. He then compels Stefan to leave. However, Stefan is able to override the compulsion because he has vervain in his system and then hurries back into the tunnels, where he injects a syringe filled with his blood into Damon, making him human. He then takes Damon's place and dies while making sure Katherine is in hell. Both their bodies are destroyed. Stefan visits Elena in the state between life and death, tells her what happened, and then joins Lexi in the afterlife. Some time later, Bonnie breaks Elena's sleeping curse and Elena finally reunites with her, Damon, Caroline, Matt and Alaric and they all attend Stefan’s funeral. Years later, the Salvatore boarding house is turned into a school for supernatural children by Caroline and Alaric with Jeremy and Dorian among the people running it. Klaus donates a lot of money to the school. Matt is awarded with a bench in his honour for saving the town that night and announces that he is running for mayor. Bonnie decides that she wants to travel the world and live her spared life to the fullest. Vicki, Tyler, Liz, Jo, and Enzo are shown watching over the living. Elena has become a medical doctor and sits in front of Stefan’s tomb. She thanks him for everything while writing in her diary; Damon appears and it is revealed they married each other. After having lived their long, happy human lives together, Damon and Elena die and find peace in the afterlife. Elena reunites with her parents, John, and Jenna in the afterlife at the Gilbert family home. Damon reunites with Stefan tearfully at the Salvatore mansion, concluding the series.

== Production ==
Filming for the season began on July 20, 2016. It was announced on July 23, 2016, that season 8 of The Vampire Diaries would be the series' last and co-creator Kevin Williamson would return as a showrunner. Filming for the season ended on February 8, 2017.

=== Casting ===
On January 26, 2017, it was announced that Nina Dobrev would return as Elena Gilbert in the series finale. At the end of the episode, "It's Been a Hell of a Ride" on February 24, 2017, it was revealed that Dobrev would reprise her role of Katherine Pierce as well.

== Reception ==
=== Critical response ===
Based on 16 reviews, the eighth season holds a 100% on Rotten Tomatoes with an average rating of 8 out of 10. The site's critics' consensus reads, "Even into its eighth season, The Vampire Diaries exceeds genre expectations while still servicing fans with Nina Dobrev's return."

=== Ratings ===
Viewership and ratings per episode of The Vampire Diaries season 8
No.	Title	Air date	Rating/share (18–49)	Viewers (millions)	DVR (18–49)	DVR viewers (millions)	Total (18–49)	Total viewers (millions)
1	"Hello, Brother"	October 21, 2016	0.4/2	0.98	0.3	0.63	0.7	1.62
2	"Today Will Be Different"	October 28, 2016	0.3/1	0.90	0.4	0.72	0.7	1.62
3	"You Decided That I Was Worth Saving"	November 4, 2016	0.4/2	0.94	0.3	0.69	0.7	1.63
4	"An Eternity of Misery"	November 11, 2016	0.4/1	1.00	0.3	0.73	0.7	1.72
5	"Coming Home Was a Mistake"	November 18, 2016	0.3/1	0.92	0.4	—N/a	0.7	—N/a
6	"Detoured on Some Random Backwoods Path to Hell"	December 2, 2016	0.4/2	1.05	0.4	0.72	0.8	1.78
7	"The Next Time I Hurt Somebody, It Could Be You"	December 9, 2016	0.4/1	0.98	0.5	0.90	0.9	1.88
8	"We Have History Together"	January 13, 2017	0.4/2	0.95	TBD	TBD	TBD	TBD
9	"The Simple Intimacy of the Near Touch"	January 20, 2017	0.3/1	0.86	0.4	0.74	0.7	1.60
10	"Nostalgia's a Bitch"	January 27, 2017	0.3/1	0.94	TBD	TBD	TBD	TBD
11	"You Made a Choice to Be Good"	February 3, 2017	0.3/1	0.92	TBD	TBD	TBD	TBD
12	"What Are You?"	February 10, 2017	0.4/2	1.11	TBD	TBD	TBD	TBD
13	"The Lies Will Catch Up to You"	February 17, 2017	0.4/1	0.99	0.4	0.75	0.8	1.74
14	"It's Been a Hell of a Ride"	February 24, 2017	0.4/2	1.04	0.4	0.69	0.8	1.74
15	"We're Planning a June Wedding"	March 3, 2017	0.4/1	1.14	TBD	TBD	TBD	TBD
16	"I Was Feeling Epic"	March 10, 2017	0.5/2	1.15	TBD	TBD	TBD	TBD
