= Bregje Heinen =

Dutch fashion model (born 1993)

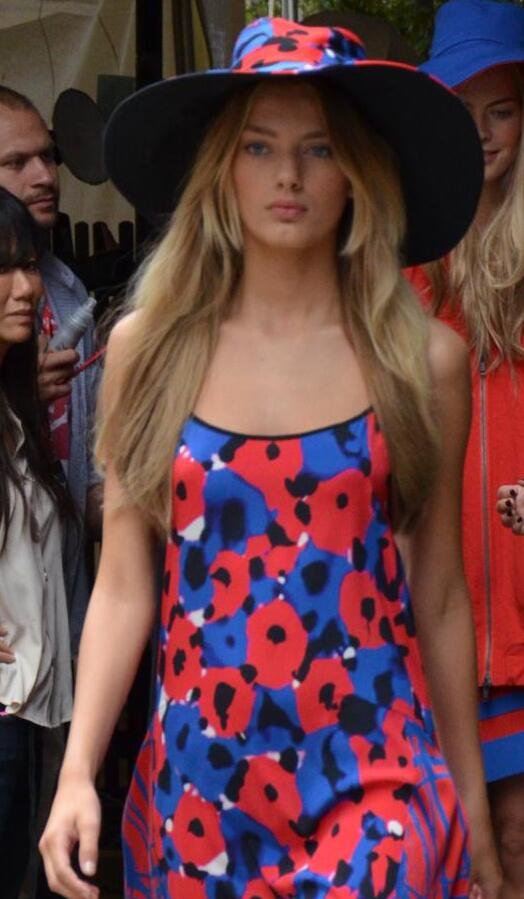
- Heinen in 2012
- Born: 5 March 1993 (age 33); Borculo, Berkelland, Gelderland, Netherlands
- Occupation: Model
- Spouse: Michael Trevino (m. 2025)
- Children: 1
- Modeling information
- Height: 5 ft 9 1/2 in (1.77 m)
- Hair color: Blonde
- Eye color: Blue
- Agency: Elite Model Management (New York); Women Management (Paris, Milan); Select Model Management (London); Micha Models (Amsterdam); IMM Bruxelles (Brussels); Scoop Models (Copenhagen); Modelink (Gothenburg); Modelwerk (Hamburg); Public Image Management (Montreal)

Bregje Heinen Trevino (born 5 March 1993) is a Dutch fashion model and actress. In 2011, she became a Victoria's Secret Angel. She first appeared in the Sports Illustrated Swimsuit Issue in 2014.

== Career ==
=== Modeling ===
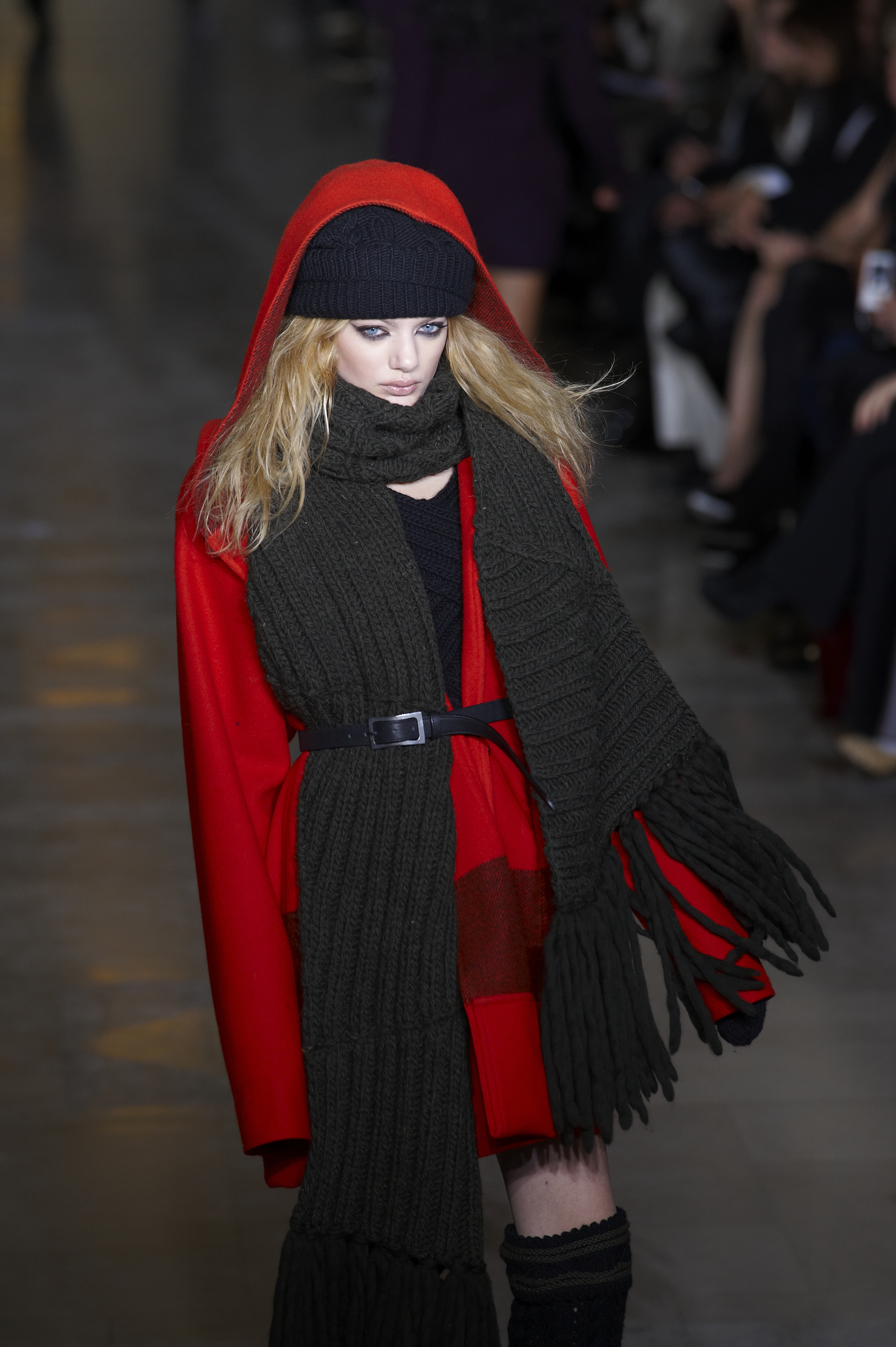
Heinen walking the runway for Jill Stuart Fall/Winter show at New York Fashion Week (2010)

Heinen was discovered in Hyves by a scout for Salva Models. Shortly afterwards, she switched to Micha Models. She has since joined Women Management in Milan, Paris and New York, Select London, Dominique Brussels, UNO Barcelona, and Place Hamburg.

She has appeared in advertising campaigns for Guess, DKNY, Prada, Just Cavalli, Replay, Topshop, Karen Millen, Sisley, H&M and Versace.

Heinen has walked the runways for Alexander McQueen, Donna Karan, Just Cavalli, Elie Saab, Zac Posen, Fendi, Balenciaga, Stella McCartney, and Karl Lagerfeld. She notably fell on the catwalk during the Fall/Winter 2012-13 fashion show of Roberto Verino.

She has appeared in editorials for Italian, Russian, Netherlands and Spain Elle, U.S., Japanese, Mexican and Kazakhstan Harper's Bazaar and British, Portugal, Russian and Mexican Vogue. She also appeared on Maroon 5's music video for "Payphone". Heinen appeared in the Sports Illustrated Swimsuit Edition in 2014.

In 2017, Heinen was featured on the cover of Fashion's February and Maxim's September issue respectively.

==== Victoria's Secret ====
In 2011, Heinen walked in the Victoria's Secret Fashion Show. Alongside Candice Swanepoel and Lais Ribeiro, Heinen then appeared in the commercial for the brand's underwear collection, Body by Victoria. She made her second appearance in the company's fashion show in 2012. In 2013, she was in the Victoria's Secret "multi way" bra commercial and walked in 2014 fashion show.

=== Acting ===
Aside from modeling, Heinen is also an actress. She made her acting debut in the 2019 independent drama film The Assistant. She then appeared in an episode of the television series Billions in 2020. Her next role was as Charlotte in an episode of the fourth season of Search Party in 2021. In the following year, she had a minor role in Damien Chazelle's comedy-drama Babylon.

=== Popularity ===
Heinen was voted No. 48 in 2016, No. 74 in 2017, No. 37 in 2018, No. 135 in 2020, No. 79 in 2021, No. 63 in 2022 and No. 101 in 2023 in FHM's annual "500 most beautiful women in the Netherlands" poll and No. 18 in Maxim's 2017 "Hot 100 List".

== Personal life ==
Heinen was born in Borculo, a town in the eastern Netherlands. She has been living in New York since she was seventeen. Since 2021, Heinen has been dating American actor Michael Trevino. The pair got engaged on 24 December 2023. They were married on 20 June 2025. In 2026, the couple welcomed a son.

== Filmography ==
Year	Title	Role	Notes
2019	The Assistant	Tatiana	
2020	Billions	Model	Episode: "The Chris Rock Test"
2021	Search Party	Charlotte	Episode: "Home Again, Home Again, Jiggity-Jig"
2022	Babylon	Nathalie	Guest appearance

=== Music videos ===
Year	Title	Artist(s)	Role
2012	"Payphone"	Maroon 5 featuring Wiz Khalifa	Sonya
