= I Was Feeling Epic =

- The Vampire Diaries episode
- Episode no.: Season 8 Episode 16
- Directed by: Julie Plec
- Written by: Julie Plec; Kevin Williamson
- Production code: 296766
- Original air date: March 10, 2017

Guest appearances
- Nina Dobrev (Katherine Pierce & Elena Gilbert); Kayla Ewell (Vicki Donovan); Joel Gretsch (Peter Maxwell); Demetrius Bridges (Dorian Williams); Steven R. McQueen (Jeremy Gilbert); Sara Canning (Jenna Sommers); Michael Trevino (Tyler Lockwood); Marguerite MacIntyre (Liz Forbes); David Anders (John Gilbert); Jodi Lyn O'Keefe (Jo Laughlin); Jasmine Guy (Sheila Bennett); Arielle Kebbel (Lexi Branson); Jaz Sinclair (Beatrice Bennett); Natashia Williams (Lucy Bennett)

Episode chronology
← Previous "We're Planning a June Wedding"	Next → —
- The Vampire Diaries season 8

"I Was Feeling Epic" is the series finale of The CW television series The Vampire Diaries, as well as the 16th and last episode of season 8. It is also the 171st episode overall. It originally aired on Friday, March 10, 2017. The episode is written by the series developers Kevin Williamson and Julie Plec, and directed by Julie Plec. A one-hour retrospective aired before the finale.

== Plot ==
As Stefan Salvatore (Paul Wesley) and Caroline (Candice King) attempt to revive Bonnie (Kat Graham), Bonnie enters the state between life and death and sees Elena (Nina Dobrev) and they reunite. Elena is shocked to see Bonnie and says that it is too early. Bonnie doesn't mind being dead, saying that she will be with Enzo (Michael Malarkey). Enzo then appears and comes up to the pair and tells Bonnie that it isn't her time and she returns to her body. Stefan (Paul Wesley) and Damon (Ian Somerhalder) return to the boarding house and find Elena's coffin opened with Elena standing there. Damon and Elena reunite and hug but she turns out to be Katherine (Nina Dobrev) instead.

Stefan then stabs Katherine with the dagger made from her bones, but she comes back to Damon later, revealing that she can leave hell whenever she wants and that Cade had been under her control since her death. Meanwhile, Matt (Zach Roerig) confronts Vicki (Kayla Ewell) and she reveals that she wants to die from the hellfire so she can escape hell, where she has been residing in a miserable existence. Vicki will ring the bell every five minutes until the end of the hour. After hearing this, Matt and the police evacuate the town. Alaric (Matt Davis), Caroline, and the twins also leave Mystic Falls when Bonnie comes up with a plan to use her magic to reverse the hellfire back into hell, destroying it and Katherine.

Damon stays with Katherine in the tunnels under the Armory to make sure she is in hell when Bonnie does this; Stefan comes forward to sacrifice himself instead, but Damon compels him to leave. Stefan then takes Damon's place, and dies alongside Katherine. Though Bonnie struggles at first, the spirits of Enzo and fellow Bennett witches appear to give Bonnie the strength she needs. Caroline is seen in the car with Alaric, and he tells her Stefan's plan. She calls Stefan, in tears, and quotes "I will love you forever" with Alaric hearing those words.

Stefan then visits Elena in their high school in the state between life and death. He tells her that he is human now and says that Damon wanted to sacrifice everything for Elena and the town. He says that Damon compelled him to leave out of the tunnels but the compulsion hadn't actually worked since Stefan was on vervain. Stefan then explains that he gave Damon his blood with the cure and that he will start to age and soon be dead. Stefan also says that he saw a side of Damon that he had not seen in a while - the older brother he looked up to, the son who enlisted in the civil war to please his father, the Damon he knew when he was a boy; he wanted that Damon to live and wanted Elena to have a chance to get to know him. Stefan says to Elena "It is good to see you, Elena... one last time...", and whispers something in Elena's ear and then joins Lexi (Arielle Kebbel) in the afterlife and quotes "I was feeling epic" and hugs her. Some time later, Bonnie breaks Elena's sleeping curse and Elena reunites with her, Damon, Caroline, Matt and Alaric. After an emotional goodbye to Stefan in the cemetery, Elena conveys a message to Caroline which Stefan had told her; "I heard her. And I will love her forever too". The Salvatore boarding house is turned into a school for supernatural children with Jeremy and Dorian among the people running it and a hefty $3 million donation from Klaus (Joseph Morgan). Vicki, Tyler (Michael Trevino), Liz (Marguerite MacIntyre), Jo (Jodi Lyn O'Keefe), and Enzo are shown watching over the living.

In the future, Damon and Elena are shown to be married. Elena is seen writing in the diary near Stefan's grave about how everything is as a crow flies and sits on a grave (a reference from the show’s pilot). After Damon and Elena's long lives shared together, Elena finds peace in the afterlife and reunites with her parents, John (David Anders), and Jenna (Sara Canning); and Stefan, at peace, opens the door to the boarding house to see Damon, who greets him with "Hello, brother" in a nod to the words Damon first said to Stefan in the pilot episode, ending it the way it started, and the brothers hug, having found peace after death and bringing the series to a conclusion.

== Feature music ==
In "I Was Feeling Epic" the following songs are heard:

- "Never Say Never" by The Fray
- "Hold On" by Chord Overstreet
- "Take on the World" by You Me At Six

== Reception ==
The episode received critical acclaim, with most reviewers appreciating the writers' skill in successfully ending the long eight-year run of the hit series in an emotion-driven finale.

Kelly Lawler of USA Today praised the episode by calling it a "whirlwind finale" that "should have you alternating between sobbing and grinning".

Samantha Highfill of Entertainment Weekly said "the most impressive thing this finale did was find a way to honor every love story this show's ever told. I can walk away feeling like I got closure on each and every one — and maybe a little hope on one in particular — all the while not one stands out as the 'winner.' And that's not a small feat."

Caroline Preece of Den of Geek praised the episode saying "True to form, a lot happened during I Was Feeling Epic, spanning decades of time and featuring more twists and turns than should really be allowed in a single hour. But this is The Vampire Diaries, and its biggest sin would have been if it was boring. [...] it'd be impossible for me to sum up what this show has meant to me and so many others over these past eight years."

TVLine's Andy Swift said "The Vampire Diaries has always been a show about loss, about heartache, about powering through the difficult times in order to see the beauty in the world around you. And that’s exactly what this ending was — beautiful."
