= Natashia Williams =

American actress

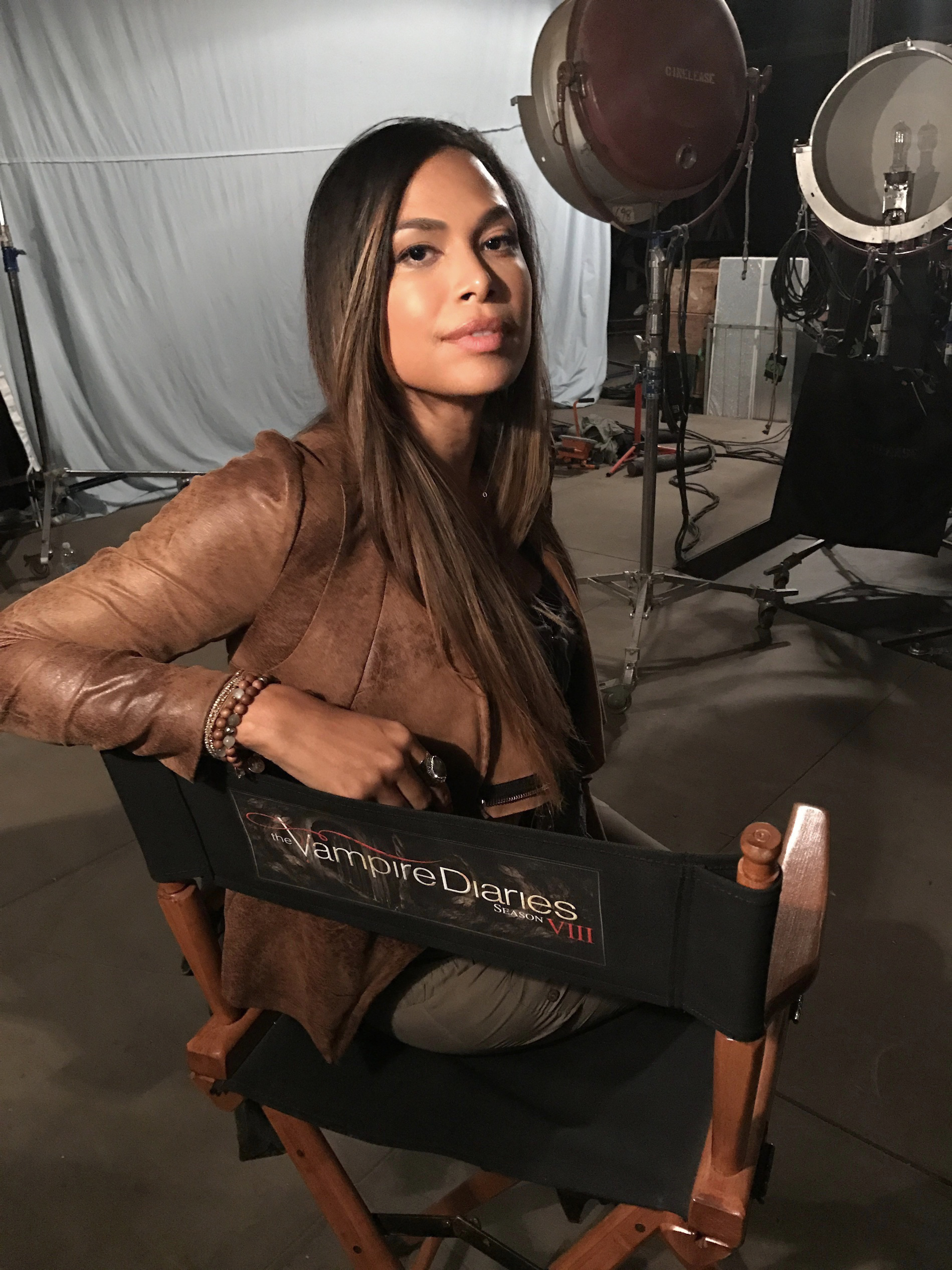
- Natashia Williams in 2017 as "Lucy" filming on the set of The Vampire Diaries
- Born: U.S.
- Other name: Natashia Williams-Blach
- Occupations: Actress, model, singer, author
- Years active: 1995–present
- Spouse: Brevin Blach

Natashia Williams-Blach is an American actress, model, and singer known for appearing in TV shows like The Vampire Diaries and She Spies.

== Biography ==
Natashia Williams began her film and television career at the age of 16, appearing first on Saved by the Bell: The New Class. After graduating high school, she would go on to accept a scholarship to attend the University of California Los Angeles (UCLA). While juggling studies and acting work, she gave her account of race relations on campus, and navigating as a biracial of dual Afro-European heritage. Shortly thereafter she landed her first movie role in Def Jam's How to Be a Player.

While still modeling, Williams appeared in both movies and television shows such as Son of the Beach, Smart Guy, Malcolm & Eddie, The Parkers, Girlfriends and the film Two Can Play That Game. She also appeared in several music videos from 1997 to 2003 for notable music artists such as Ginuwine, Montell Jordan, Usher, Sting, and Joe.

Williams first starring role on a series occurred on the show So Little Time alongside the Olsen Twins. Shortly after, Williams co-starred in She Spies with Kristen Miller and Natasha Henstridge. Although purchased for syndication, it lasted two seasons due to declining ratings.

She then starred alongside Romeo Miller in the series Romeo! on Nickelodeon, playing Angeline Miller for the last two seasons.

In 2006, she then booked the pilot, Filthy Gorgeous, about the New York sub world of high-class escorts, also starring Isabella Rossellini. The pilot was not picked up although the single episode aired on Showtime Networks as a feature film. She also filmed a cameo appearance in the Anna Faris comedy Smiley Face.

Following guest-star stints on both CSI: Miami and CSI: NY, she auditioned for season 7 of American Idol, succeeding through to the Top 25 before being eliminated.

Williams then stars in the Paramount Pictures psychological thriller, Circle of Eight, and also had a minor recurring role on The Vampire Diaries.

In 2013, Williams also wrote a book based on her life and career, Mind Over Model, An Internal Journey Through The World Of Externals. The following year she started Gypsy Posh By TOSH, an artisan crafted jewelry line, as both owner and designer.

She wrote and performs on the eleventh track: "Shady," from the second solo studio album Digital Bullet by RZA going by the pseudonym ‘Bobby Digital’, alongside the music group Intrigue.

In July 2006, she performed live on stage, singing with Corey Feldman and his Band ‘The Truth Movement’ at the renowned House Of Blues in Hollywood, California.

Natashia has been married to Brevin Blach since December 2006; they have two children.

== Filmography ==
=== Film ===
| Year | Title | Role | Notes |
|---|---|---|---|
| 1997 | Def Jam's How to Be a Player | Pink Bikini Girl | |
| 1999 | Trippin' | Denia, Snap's Girl | |
| 2001 | Two Can Play That Game | Sexy Young Girl | |
| 2006 | Filthy Gorgeous | Keisha | TV Movie |
| 2007 | Smiley Face | Motorcycle Rider | |
| 2009 | Circle of Eight | India | |

=== Television ===
| Year | Title | Role | Notes |
|---|---|---|---|
| 1995 | Saved by the Bell: The New Class | Valerie Butler | Episode: "Prom Dates" |
| 1995 | Sister Sister | Tiffany | Episode: "Thanksgiving in Hawaii" |
| 1997 | Malcolm & Eddie | The Beautiful Woman | Episode: "Trading Spaces" |
| 1997–98 | Smart Guy | Alina/Janice | Episode: "Lab Rats" & "Diary of a Mad Schoolgirl" |
| 2000 | Grown Ups | Tasha | Episode: "New Job" |
| 2000 | Son of the Beach | Montego Bay | Episode: "In the G-Hetto" |
| 2000 | Girlfriends | Debbie Rae Porter | Episode: "The Remains of the Date" |
| 2001 | The Parkers | Yolanda | Episode: "Baby Girl" |
| 2001 | Men, Women & Dogs | Lisa | Episode: "Kibbles & Grits" |
| 2001–02 | So Little Time | Tedi | Main cast |
| 2003 | Summer Music Mania | Herself | Celebrity Bikini Contest Winner |
| 2003 | FX DVD Exclusive Awards | Herself | Presenter |
| 2003 | Spike TV James Bond “He Spies/She Spies Marathon” | Herself | Co-Host |
| 2003 | BET Lady of Soul Awards | Herself | Presenter |
| 2003 | BET Soul Train Awards | Herself | Presenter |
| 2002–04 | She Spies | Shane Phillips | Main cast |
| 2004–06 | Romeo! | Angeline "Angie" Eckert Miller | Main cast: season 2–3 |
| 2005 | CSI: Miami | Kim Burton | Episode: "Killer Date" |
| 2006 | All of Us | Clarinetta Cliché | Episode: "Domo Arigato, Mr. Roberto" |
| 2006 | CSI: NY | Kendra Tevis | Episode: "Oedipus Hex" |
| 2008 | American Idol | Herself | Cast: Season 7 |
| 2010, 2017 | The Vampire Diaries | Lucy Bennett | Episode: "Masquerade" & "I Was Feeling Epic" |
| 2013 | Mr. Box Office | Gabrielle | Episode: "Single Mama Drama" |

=== Music Videos ===
| Year | Title | Artist |
|---|---|---|
| 2001 | "Stutter" | Joe featuring Mystikal |
| 1997 | “Send My Love” | Born Jamericans |
| 1997 | “Big Bad Mama” | Foxxy Brown featuring Dru Hill |
| 1998 | “Unbound” | Robbie Robertson |
| 1998 | “Clock Strikes” | Timbaland & Magoo featuring Mad Skillz |
| 1998 | “I Can Do That” | Montell Jordan |
| 1998 | “When You Get Home” | Montell Jordan |
| 1998 | “Whatcha Gone Do?” | Link |
| 1999 | “Get Ready” | Mase featuring Blackstreet |
| 1999 | “G’d Up” | Tha Eastsidaz featuring Snoop Dogg |
| 2000 | “Wifey” | Next |
| 2000 | “After the Rain Has Fallen” | Sting |
| 2001 | “U Remind Me” | Usher |
| 2003 | “In Those Jeans” | Ginuwine |

== Sources ==
- Tsunami Benefit Song MTV
- Donate to Los Angeles Mission Transform a Life
- GypsyPosh website
- Mind Over Model Internal Externals
- So Little Time. Where are they now? MTV
- Natashia Williams
- She Spies Variety
- San Diego Magazine
