= List of Mr. Box Office episodes =

Mr. Box Office is an American syndicated sitcom that premiered on September 22, 2012. The series centers on Marcus Jackson (Bill Bellamy), a well-known movie actor who ends up in legal trouble due to a physical altercation with a paparazzo, leading to his sentence to teach a class of inner-city high school students in Los Angeles' infamous South Central neighborhood. The following is a list of episodes of the program, shown in order of its broadcast airdate.

== Series overview ==
Season	Episodes	Originally released	
Season	Episodes	First released	Last released
1	26	September 22, 2012	August 16, 2013
2	10	November 22, 2013	April 25, 2015

== Episodes ==
=== Season 1 (2012–13) ===
No. overall	No. in season	Title	Directed by	Written by	Original release date
1	1	"Pilot"	Shelley Jensen	Byron Allen & Scott Satin	September 22, 2012
2	2	"Somebody's Watching Me"	Robert Countryman	Anthony Hill	September 22, 2012
3	3	"Money, Money, Money"	Ted Lange	Josh Goldstein	September 29, 2012
4	4	"Histor-Vention"	Ted Lange	Brian Keith Etheridge	September 29, 2012
5	5	"Super Fan"	Ted Lange	Michele Marburger & Kevin Marburger	October 20, 2012
6	6	"Cyra-No You Didn't"	Ted Lange	Walter Allen Bennett Jr.	October 27, 2012
7	7	"Man Up"	Ted Lange	Maiya Williams	November 3, 2012
8	8	"The Uniformed Strike"	Ted Lange	Anthony Hill	November 10, 2012
9	9	"Marcus Drops a Bomb"	Ted Lange	Josh Goldstein	November 17, 2012
10	10	"Who's Your Daddy?"	Ted Lange	Scott Satin	January 26, 2013
11	11	"That's the Ticket"	Ted Lange	Brian Keith Etheridge	February 9, 2013
12	12	"The Golden Apple Awards"	Ted Lange	Michele Marburger & Kevin Marburger	February 16, 2013
13	13	"The Honor Code"	Ted Lange	Maiya Williams	February 23, 2013
14	14	"Mr. Jackson Goes to Washington"	Ted Lange	Scott Satin	March 30, 2013
15	15	"No Pass, No Play"	Ted Lange	Anthony Hill	April 20, 2013
16	16	"My Favorite Martin"	Ted Lange	Walter Allen Bennett Jr.	April 27, 2013
17	17	"Marcus Stands Up"	Ted Lange	Josh Goldstein	May 4, 2013
18	18	"Weekday With Ernie"	Ted Lange	Kevin Marburger & Michele Marburger	May 11, 2013
19	19	"Fifty Shades of Gray Hair"	Ted Lange	Scott Satin	May 18, 2013
20	20	"Marcus Gets Kung Pow'ed"	Ted Lange	Josh Goldstein	June 7, 2013
21	21	"A Star is Born"	Ted Lange	Anthony Hill	June 14, 2013
22	22	"Single Momma Drama"	Ted Lange	Kevin Marburger & Michele Marburger	June 21, 2013
23	23	"Holy Matriphony"	Ted Lange	Anthony Hill	June 28, 2013
24	24	"There Goes the Neighborhood"	Ted Lange	Josh Goldstein	July 19, 2013
25	25	"Screenplayed"	Ted Lange	Michele Marburger & Kevin Marburger	August 9, 2013
26	26	"Painfully Employed"	Jackée Harry	Anthony Hill	August 16, 2013

=== Season 2 (2013–15) ===
No. overall	No. in season	Title	Directed by	Written by	Original release date
27	1	"Major Justice"	Ted Lange	Josh Goldstein	November 22, 2013
28	2	"Robin in the Hood"	Ted Lange	Scott Satin	November 28, 2013
29	3	"Samboozled"	Ted Lange	Scott Satin	November 8, 2014
30	4	"Funky Friday"	Ted Lange	Cary Schwartz	November 15, 2014
31	5	"Dead Marcus Walking"	Ted Lange	Josh Goldstein	November 22, 2014
32	6	"Save the Music"	Ted Lange	Josh Goldstein	January 31, 2015
33	7	"A Matter of Principal"	Ted Lange	Scott Satin	February 7, 2015
34	8	"Night of the Living Students"	Ted Lange	Scott Satin	February 14, 2015
35	9	"There's No Place Like Homecoming"	Ted Lange	Scott Satin	February 21, 2015
36	10	"Why Am I Not Surprised?"	Ted Lange	Scott Satin	April 25, 2015
