= A Get2Gether =

- Directed by: Ceon Forte
- Written by: B. Cole; E. Rico Nance
- Produced by: Earl Husbands; Terrance Franklin
- Starring: B. Cole; Tony Roberts; Dorea Torell; Shari Newman; Tiffany Curtis
- Cinematography: Marco Rodriguez
- Edited by: Stephen Parrot
- Music by: Brian "B-Crucial" Morton; Marshall Hood
- Distributed by: UrbanWorks Entertainment
- Release date: September 28, 2005 (IFP New York)
- Running time: 98 minutes
- Country: United States
- Language: English

A Get2Gether is a 2005 comedy film, directed by Ceon Forte, and starring B. Cole and Tony Roberts. The film was director Forte's feature-film directorial debut.

== Plot ==
Derrick (Cole) has just gotten back home from college for his summer vacation. He's desperate to share an intimate moment with his new girlfriend Reashon (Tiffany J. Curtis), and a candle lit, couples-only gathering seems like it would provide the perfect opportunity for romance to blossom. The only problem is that Derrick's best friend Jay (Roberts) can't find a date for the party. Bitter at being snubbed by his best friend for a girl, Jay invites everyone in the hood to Derrick's party and it's not too long before the house is overflowing with eager party seekers.
