= Smiley Face (film) =

- Theatrical release poster
- Directed by: Gregg Araki
- Written by: Dylan Haggerty
- Produced by: Gregg Araki; Steve Golin; Alix Madigan-Yorkin; Kevin Turen; Henry Winterstern
- Starring: Anna Faris; Danny Masterson; Adam Brody; Rick Hoffman; Jane Lynch; John Krasinski; Marion Ross; Michael Hitchcock; John Cho; Danny Trejo; Roscoe Lee Browne
- Cinematography: Shawn Kim
- Edited by: Gregg Araki
- Music by: David Kitay
- Production companies: Anonymous Content; Desperate Pictures
- Distributed by: First Look Studios
- Release dates: January 21, 2007 (Sundance); November 16, 2007 (United States)
- Running time: 84 minutes
- Countries: United States; Germany
- Language: English
- Box office: $179,381

Smiley Face is a 2007 stoner comedy film directed and co-produced by Gregg Araki. Written by Dylan Haggerty, it stars Anna Faris as a young woman who has a series of misadventures after eating cupcakes laced with cannabis. The supporting cast includes Danny Masterson, Adam Brody, Rick Hoffman, Jane Lynch, John Krasinski, Marion Ross, Michael Hitchcock, John Cho, Danny Trejo, and Roscoe Lee Browne in his final film appearance. Smiley Face was the ninth feature film directed by Araki.

== Plot ==
Jane is an unambitious economics major turned television commercial actress living in Los Angeles. She is a frequent marijuana user, and one day while stoned eats a plate of her roommate's cupcakes that he had set aside for a science fiction convention. She realizes that the cupcakes are laced with cannabis; as her intoxication intensifies, she recalls a number of important tasks she is obliged to do that day, including paying her electric bill and going to an audition.

She calls her dealer, to whom she owes several hundred dollars, and purchases marijuana to use to replace the cupcakes. He threatens to take her furniture if she cannot resolve her debt, and instructs her to meet him with the money that afternoon at a hemp festival being held at Venice Beach. As Jane begins making cannabis-infused butter for the cupcakes, she is distracted by phone calls from her agent and her boyfriend, causing the butter to burn. Jane decides to sell her stash of government-issued marijuana to pay the debt, and at her audition offers it for purchase to another actress and the casting director. When the casting director appears to phone the police, a panicked Jane flushes the marijuana down a toilet.

Jane begins cold-calling various acquaintances for money, eventually reaching out to Brevin, a friend of her roommate's who is infatuated with her. He agrees to loan her the money after his dental appointment; they travel to the dental office together, which Jane notices is near the home of her former Marxian economics professor. Upon leaving, Brevin finds his car was broken into and his wallet, which was left on the dashboard, stolen. When the police arrive to question them, a paranoid Jane flees to her former professor's home. She is greeted by his mother who, believing that Jane is her son's teaching assistant, entrusts her with a first edition copy of The Communist Manifesto to take to his office.

Jane decides to use the book to pay off the debt. She stows away in the back of a truck that she believes will take her to Venice Beach; it takes her to a meat-packing plant in El Monte. A factory worker agrees to drive her to her destination. When a car accident causes a traffic jam, Jane leaves the car and continues on foot, before being given a ride by a woman riding a motorcycle. Upon arriving, Jane discovers that the festival has already ended. Wandering the beach, she finds several tickets that she uses to board the Ferris wheel on the Venice Beach Boardwalk.

While on the ride, she sees a group of people she has encountered throughout the day looking for her on the boardwalk. Recognizing that she must do the right thing and return the book, Jane waves to get their attention; as she does so, the carriage shifts and the book slips from her hands, causing the pages to tear out and scatter. She is arrested, and sentenced to a five-year suspended sentence and 1,500 hours of community service for grand larceny and property destruction.

== Cast ==
- Anna Faris as Jane F.
- Roscoe Lee Browne as narrator/Himself (voice)
- Adam Brody as Steve the Dealer
- John Krasinski as Brevin Ericson
- Danny Masterson as Steve Czerk Johowiski / Steve the Roommate
- Jane Lynch as Casting director
- Jayma Mays as Waiting room actress
- Jim Rash as Casting Assistant
- Marion Ross as Shirley
- Brian Posehn as Bus driver
- Rick Hoffman as Angry Face
- Joey "Coco" Diaz as Security guard
- Michael Hitchcock as Laundry room man
- John Cho as Mikey
- Danny Trejo as Albert
- Richard Riehle as Mr. Herbert Spencer
- Natashia Williams as Motorcyclist
- Carrot Top as himself
- Dave "Gruber" Allen as Hippie #1
- Dylan Haggerty as Ferris wheel attendant
- Michael Shamus Wiles as Officer Jones
- William Zabka as Prison guard

== Reception ==
Smiley Face premiered at the 2007 Sundance Film Festival, followed by a very small theatrical release; in Los Angeles it had a week long run at the Nuart Theatre in Santa Monica. The film was released to DVD on January 8, 2008. Nathan Lee in his review for the Village Voice wrote that "...100 percent sober when I watched it, I can say with some authority that Dylan Haggerty has written an eleventh-hour candidate for the funniest movie of 2007, that Gregg Araki has directed his finest film since 1997's Nowhere, and that Faris, flawless, rocks their inspired idiot odyssey in a virtuoso comedic turn." It also toured around British cinemas in the summer of 2008 as part of the 22nd London Lesbian and Gay Film Festival.

In his review for The New York Times, Matt Zoller Seitz praised Faris' "freakishly committed performance as Jane F. [that] suggests Amy Adams’s princess from Enchanted dropped into a Cheech and Chong movie". Andrew O'Hehir wrote in his review for Salon, "Smiley Face, has a wonderful performance by Anna Faris and one of the all-time great stoner monologues in movie history". In her review for Cinematical, Monika Bartyzel wrote, "Araki's comedy gives us the best of many comedic worlds in an incessantly funny, easily-quotable serving. From discussions of Marxism to love of lasagna, Smiley Face serves it all — with some weed and a very, very stoned smile". The review of the New York Daily News states that "Not since Sean Penn's Jeff Spicoli in Fast Times at Ridgemont High has an actor so thoroughly dominated the screen while pretending to be in a chemically altered state." In the review of Los Angeles Times it is argued that "Gregg Araki's delirious "Smiley Face" is an unabashed valentine to Anna Faris, an opportunity for the actress to show that she can carry a movie composed of often hilarious nonstop misadventures. No matter how outrageously or foolishly Faris' Jane behaves, she remains blissfully appealing—such are Faris' fearless comedic skills."

However, S. James Snyder, in his review for the New York Sun, wrote, "If this is meant as a lighthearted change of pace for Mr. Araki, after Mysterious Skin, then perhaps he took things too far in the opposite direction. This isn't just light and fluffy; it floats away".

On review aggregator Rotten Tomatoes, the film has an approval rating of 64% based on 39 reviews, with an average rating of 5.8/10. The website's critical consensus reads, "Although many of the jokes have been done before, Anna Faris's bright performance and Gregg Araki's sharp direction make Smiley Face more than your average stoner comedy." On Metacritic, the film received a score of 71 based on 9 reviews, indicating "generally favorable reviews". Faris won the "Stonette of the Year" award at High Times magazine's Stony Awards, in Los Angeles, on October 13, 2007, for her role in Smiley Face.
