= Tony T. Roberts =

American comedian

Tony T. Roberts (born April 18, 1963) is an American comedian. He has appeared on HBO's Def Comedy Jam, BET's ComicView, and It's Showtime at the Apollo.

== Early life and education ==
Tony was born in Detroit, Michigan, and raised by his mother Annette Roberts along with his younger siblings Yvette and Terry. Tony has a younger brother Willie, with whom he was not raised.

He went to Henry Ford High School and graduated in 1981 along with his lifelong friend Perry Conway who helped and managed him with his comedy.

== Career ==
Roberts first stepped onto the stage at Mark Ridley's Comedy Castle in Royal Oak, Michigan. After Performing on BET's comic view a fan gave Tony a gold chain with a microphone on it, and told him he was her favorite comic. Tony wears it to every performance he has.

He has appeared on HBO's Def Comedy Jam, BET's ComicView, and It's Showtime at the Apollo. In February 2006, Roberts was picked to participate in the HBO US Comedy Arts Festival in Aspen.

Roberts has performed his stand-up all over the world and in most of the major clubs in the States from New York to Los Angeles such as Comedy Store, The Laugh Factory, Caroline's, One Night Stans, Celebrity Theater, the Boston Comedy Club, The Peppermint Lounge, All Jokes Aside, Fox Theatre and Regal Theatre. He has been in the BET Comedy Tour, Russell Simmons Def Comedy Jam Tour, and USO TOUR.

He was the recipient of the BET Robin Harris Award for Most Original Comic and took 2nd place in the Oakland Comedy Competition.

In addition to stand-up, Roberts has appeared in the movies, B. Cole's “A Get2gether”, Damon Dash's “Death of a Dynasty” and Coke Daniels' "Gangsta rap," which is entered in Sundance 2007. He landed national Burger King Commercials and toured with the inspirational musical stage play “If These Hips Could Talk” and “Ain't Nothing Like Family.”

His stand-up is featured on two interlude tracks on the Styles P album Super Gangster (Extraordinary Gentleman).

== Filmography ==
=== Actor ===
- Motorcity Motormouth (2019)
- Tony Roberts I'm Different (2012) (also writer)
- Speed Dating (2011)
- Tony Roberts Wired (2010) (also writer)
- Gangsta rap (2007)
- Project 313 (2006)
- A Get2Gether (2005)
- Out on Parole (2004) (V)
- Brotherly Love (2003) (V)
- Death of a Dynasty (2003)
- Durdy Game (2002) (V)
- Comedy Only in da Hood (2001) (V)(also writer)

=== Television ===
- Mr. Box Office (2012–2015)
