= Michael Trevino =

American actor (born 1985)

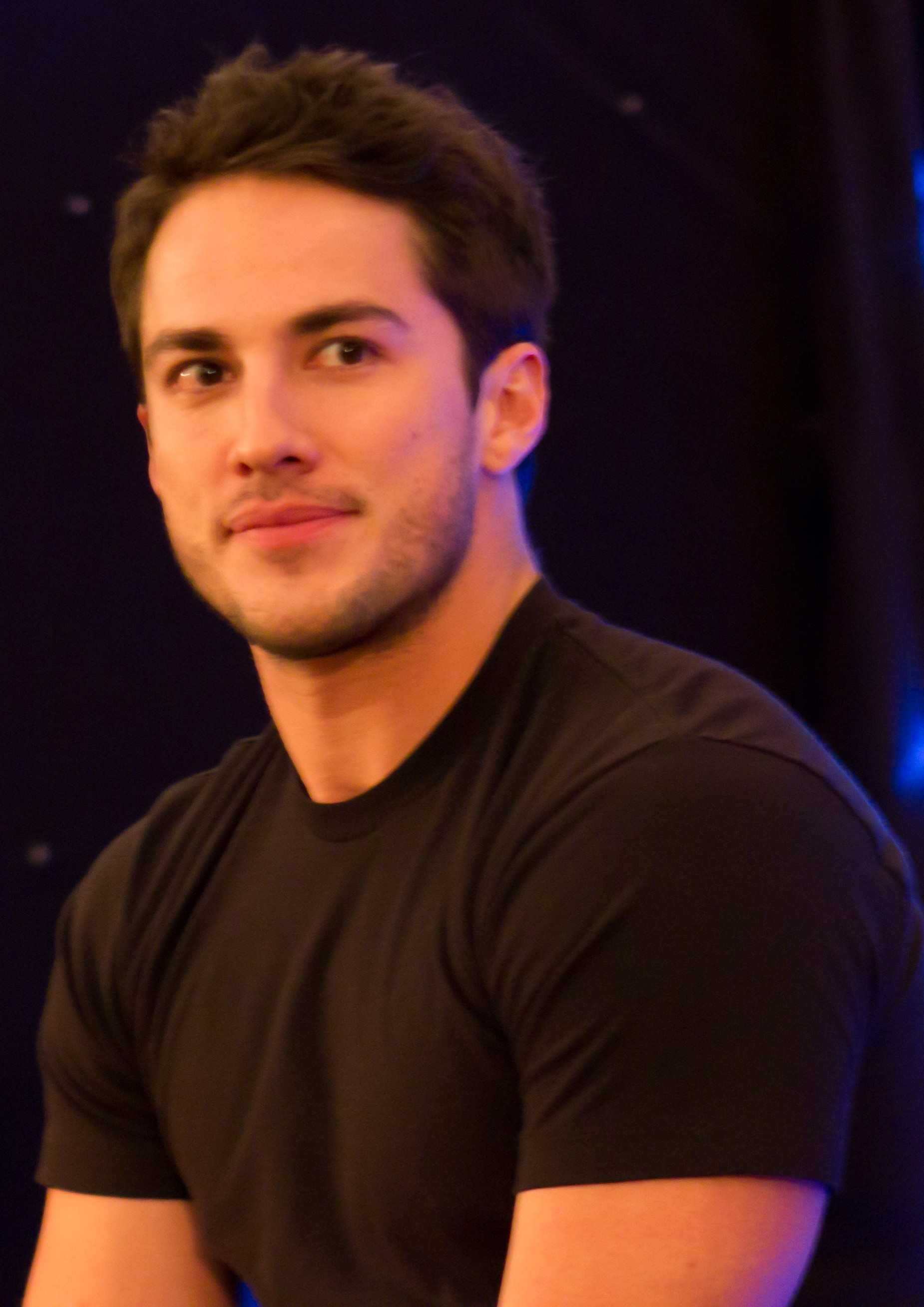
- Trevino in 2013
- Born: January 25, 1985 (age 41); Los Angeles, California, U.S.
- Occupation: Actor
- Years active: 2005–present
- Spouse: Bregje Heinen (m. 2025)
- Children: 1

Michael Trevino (born January 25, 1985) is an American actor. He is best known for his roles as Tyler Lockwood on The CW's The Vampire Diaries; and as Kyle Valenti in Roswell, New Mexico.

== Early life ==
Michael Trevino was born on January 25, 1985, in Los Angeles. He was raised in Montebello, California, and later moved to Valencia. His mother was originally from Zacatecas, Mexico, and his father was born in Fresno, California, to Mexican immigrants.

== Career ==
Trevino played the role of Jackson Meade, similar to Meade Milk, in the Disney Channel Original Movie Cow Belles. He has also appeared as a guest star on Cold Case, Without a Trace, Bones, The Mentalist as Brandon Fulton in season 1 episode 19 and Commander in Chief. Trevino also had a small role on the TV series Charmed in the eighth-season episode, "Malice in Wonderland", as Alastair. He also had a recurring role on The Riches on FX, playing high school student Brent, in a four-episode story arc in season 1, and appeared in the third episode of season 2.

He played the role of Jaime Vega on the short-lived 2007 television series Cane. In 2008, Trevino was cast for a three-episode arc on The CW's 90210, playing Ozzie, a student at West Beverly Hills High School and love interest for Naomi.

Beginning in 2009, Trevino starred as Tyler Lockwood in the series The Vampire Diaries on The CW. Trevino appeared as the same character in a recurring role on the Vampire Diaries spin-off series The Originals in 2013, the first major character to transition from one show to another. His work garnered him two Teen Choice Awards and nominations for ALMA Awards. In April 2015, it was announced that Trevino would be leaving The Vampire Diaries after the end of the sixth season, like his co-star Nina Dobrev. He later returned in the eighth season for the series finale.

From 2019, Trevino began starring in the CW's Roswell, New Mexico as Kyle Valenti, a doctor and the son of the sheriff. The series is a remake of the 1999 television series Roswell, He was in the show for four seasons until it ended in 2022. He also made his directorial debut in the fourth season of the series in which he directed episode 9.

== Personal life ==
Together with his The Vampire Diaries co-stars Candice Accola and Ian Somerhalder, Trevino supports the It Gets Better Project, which makes it a goal to prevent suicide among LGBT youth.

Trevino announced his engagement to Dutch model Bregje Heinen on December 24, 2023. The couple were married on June 20, 2025, in Barcelona. In 2026, the couple welcomed a son.

== Filmography ==
=== Film ===
Year	Title	Role	Notes
2006	Cow Belles	Jackson Meade	Television film
2009	Love Finds a Home	Joshua Coil	Television film
2012	The Factory	Tad	
2018	Out of Control	Bennet Kayser	Chinese film

=== Television ===
Year	Title	Role	Notes
2005	Summerland	Tim Bowser	Episode: "I Am the Walrus"
2005	Charmed	Alastair	Episode: "Malice in Wonderland"
2005	Commander in Chief	Kevin	Episode: "Rubie Dubidoux and the Brown Bound Express"
2006	Without a Trace	Carter Rollins	Episode: "White Balance"
2006	Cold Case	Zach	Episode: "Rampage"
2006	CSI: Miami	Matthew Batra	Episode: "Come as You Are"
2006	Bones	Graham Hastings	Episode: "The Headless Witch in the Woods"
2007–2008	The Riches	Brent	5 episodes
2007	Cane	Jaime Vega	9 episodes
2008	90210	Ozzie Cardoza	3 episodes
2009	CSI: Crime Scene Investigation	Dave Henkel	Episode: "Turn, Turn, Turn"
2009	The Mentalist	Brandon Fulton	Episode: "A Dozen Red Roses"
2009	CSI: NY	Gavin Skidmore	Episode: "Prey"
2009–2017	The Vampire Diaries	Tyler Lockwood	Main Role (seasons 1–6); Recurring Role (seasons 7–8); 21 episodes
2013	The Originals	Tyler Lockwood	2 episodes
2016	Sunset Park	Gino Sarcione	
2019–2022	Roswell, New Mexico	Kyle Valenti	Main role

== Awards and nominations ==
Year	Award	Category	Work	Result	Ref.
2011	Teen Choice Award	Choice TV: Male Scene Stealer	The Vampire Diaries	Won	
2011	ALMA Award	Favorite TV Actor – Supporting Role	The Vampire Diaries	Nominated	
2012	Teen Choice Award	Choice TV Male Scene Stealer	The Vampire Diaries	Won	
2012	ALMA Award	Favorite TV Actor – Supporting Role in a Drama	The Vampire Diaries	Nominated	
2014	Teen Choice Award	Choice TV Male Scene Stealer	The Vampire Diaries	Nominated	
