= The Vampire Diaries =

2009 American television series

- Genre: Drama; Supernatural; Dark fantasy
- Based on: The Vampire Diaries by L. J. Smith
- Developed by: Kevin Williamson; Julie Plec
- Showrunners: Kevin Williamson (seasons 1–3 & 8); Julie Plec
- Starring: Nina Dobrev; Paul Wesley; Ian Somerhalder; Steven R. McQueen; Sara Canning; Kat Graham; Candice King (Note: Credited as Candice Accola during seasons 1–6; King changed her surname after her marriage to Joe King in 2014.); Zach Roerig; Kayla Ewell; Michael Trevino; Matt Davis; Joseph Morgan; Michael Malarkey
- Composer: Michael Suby
- Country of origin: United States
- Original language: English
- No. of seasons: 8
- No. of episodes: 171 (list of episodes)

Production
- Executive producers: Leslie Morgenstein; Bob Levy; Kevin Williamson; Julie Plec; Caroline Dries; Chad Fiveash; James Stoteraux; Melinda Hsu Taylor
- Producers: Pascal Verschooris; Trish Stanard
- Production locations: Atlanta, Georgia; Covington, Georgia; Vancouver, British Columbia (pilot)
- Cinematography: Michael Karasick; Darren Genet; John Smith; Datan Hopson; Rob C. Givens
- Running time: 41–49 minutes
- Production companies: Outerbanks Entertainment; Alloy Entertainment; Bonanza Productions; CBS Television Studios; Warner Bros. Television

Original release
- Network: The CW
- Release: September 10, 2009 – March 10, 2017

Related
- The Originals; Legacies

The Vampire Diaries is an American supernatural teen drama television series developed by Kevin Williamson and Julie Plec, based on The Vampire Diaries novel series written by L. J. Smith. The series premiered on the CW on September 10, 2009, and concluded on March 10, 2017, having aired 171 episodes over eight seasons.

The first season averaged 3.60 million viewers. It became the most-watched series on the network before being surpassed by Arrow. The show has received numerous award nominations, winning four People's Choice Awards and thirty Teen Choice Awards.

In April 2015, lead actress Nina Dobrev, who played Elena Gilbert, confirmed that she would be leaving the show after its sixth season. Dobrev returned to record a voice-over for the seventh-season finale and returned as a guest star in the series finale. In March 2016, the CW renewed the series for an eighth season, but in July of that year announced that the eighth season, consisting of 16 episodes, would be the show's last.

Throughout its run, The Vampire Diaries was generally well received by critics, who praised its acting, character development, emotional depth, and thematic elements. The concepts and characters developed in the series served to launch a media franchise that includes other television series, web series, novels and comic books. The television series The Originals (2013–2018) – which also aired on the CW – was the first major entry in this collection of connected works, followed by a spin-off of The Originals entitled Legacies (2018–2022), which aired on the CW as well. The Vampire Diaries significantly influenced the supernatural teen drama genre, contributing to a surge in vampire-themed media during the late 2000s and early 2010s.

== Series overview ==
The series is set in the fictional town of Mystic Falls, Virginia, a town charged with supernatural history. Many of the scenes featuring Mystic Falls were filmed in Covington, Georgia, where fans can visit iconic landmarks from the series, including Elena Gilbert's house and The Mystic Grill. The series follows the life of Elena Gilbert, a teenage girl who has just lost both parents in a car crash, as she falls in love with a 162-year-old vampire named Stefan Salvatore, who she thinks is just a normal human. Their relationship becomes increasingly intricate as Stefan's mysterious older brother Damon Salvatore returns to Mystic Falls with a plan to bring back their past love, Katherine Pierce (born Katerina Petrova) who is Elena's doppelgänger.

Although Damon initially holds a grudge against his brother for forcing him to become a vampire, he later reconciles with Stefan, but their relationship is challenged when they both fall in love with Elena, creating a love triangle among the three. Both brothers attempt to protect Elena as they face various villains and threats to their town, including Katherine, while trying to protect their identity as vampires. Throughout the series, the Salvatore brothers' pasts and the town's history is slowly revealed through flashbacks.

Additional storylines revolve around the other inhabitants of the town, most notably Elena's younger brother Jeremiah Gilbert and aunt Jenna Sommers, her best friends Bonnie Bennett and Caroline Forbes, their mutual friends Matt Donovan and Tyler Lockwood, Matt's older sister Vicki Donovan, and their history teacher and vampire hunter Alaric Saltzman. The second season of the show introduce the Mikaelson family, whom the spinoff of the show revolves around. The town's politics are orchestrated by the Founders' council, comprising descendants of the founding families: the Fells, the Forbes, the Lockwoods, the Gilberts, and the Salvatores. They guard the town mainly from vampires and other supernatural threats such as werewolves, witches, hybrids (cross-breeds of two or more different supernatural beings), and ghosts.

== Cast and characters ==
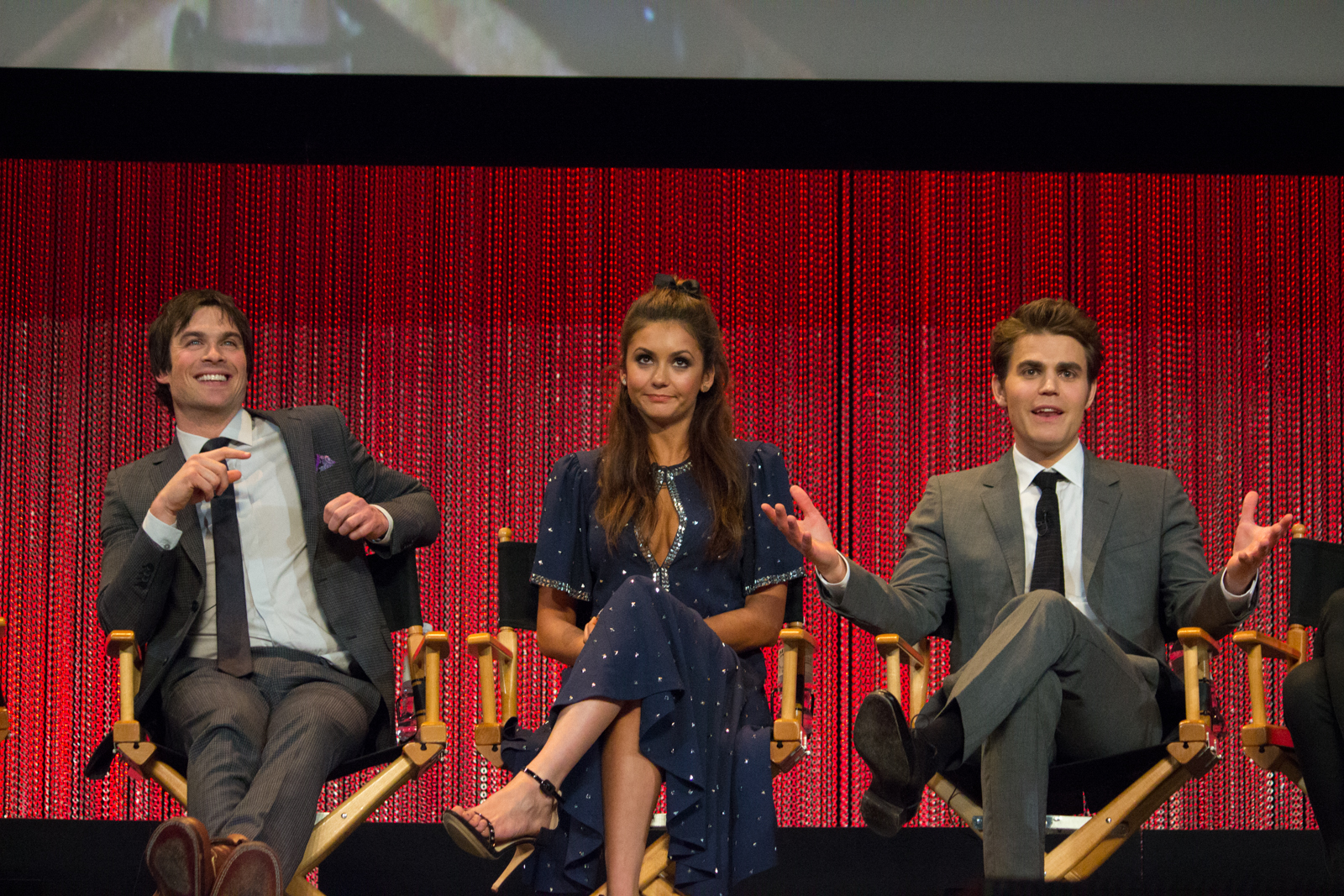
Ian Somerhalder, Nina Dobrev, and Paul Wesley at PaleyFest 2014

- Nina Dobrev as Elena Gilbert (season 1–6; guest season 8), a young orphan who falls in love with vampire Stefan Salvatore and later his brother, Damon, creating a love triangle. When Stefan turns his humanity off after being blackmailed by Klaus, Damon is given the opportunity to grow closer to Elena. This results in her being further drawn into the supernatural world and results in her struggling to survive supernatural events in the town. Elena becomes a vampire following the events of the third-season finale, but takes the cure and becomes human again in the sixth season. In the sixth-season finale, Elena's life was tied to Bonnie's in such a way that as long as Bonnie is alive, Elena will remain asleep.
  - Dobrev also portrays Elena's doppelgänger, Katerina Petrova, also known as Katherine Pierce. Dobrev sporadically appeared as Katherine in subsequent seasons, with Katherine playing a significant role in the second and fifth seasons.
  - Dobrev also plays the progenitor of the Petrova doppelgängers and Silas's true love, Amara, during the fifth season, whom he had sought in the afterlife for two thousand years.
- Paul Wesley as Stefan Salvatore, a good-hearted and affectionate vampire and the complete opposite of his older brother, Damon Salvatore. Later in the series, Stefan reverts to his old ways as a Ripper to save Damon from a werewolf bite. His role becomes more antagonistic, after being forced to turn his humanity off. Eventually, he returns to his good-hearted and caring self and reconciles with Elena, but the relationship doesn't last long. He becomes human again in the final season and marries Caroline in the eighth season but is killed afterwards in the series finale as he sacrifices himself along with Katherine to save Mystic Falls.
  - Wesley also portrays his revealed doppelgänger, Silas, the world's first immortal being, in the fourth and fifth seasons.
  - Wesley also played another doppelgänger, Tom Avery, during the fifth season.
- Ian Somerhalder as Damon Salvatore, Stefan's malevolent elder vampire brother. He is mostly thought of as selfish and manipulative, using humans for his own gain with no regard but later on begins to display a more caring side. Throughout the series, Damon is able to repair his relationship with Stefan, and becomes best friends with Alaric and Bonnie. Though his love for Elena is initially one-sided, she begins to develop feelings for him as they work together to save Stefan after he's given in to his Ripper side. They begin dating in the fourth season, after Elena transitions into a vampire, and continue to have an on-and-off relationship until a now-human Elena is put into her deep sleep at the end of the sixth season.
- Steven R. McQueen as Jeremy Gilbert (seasons 1–6; guest season 8), Elena's younger brother, actually revealed to be her biological cousin. He later becomes a member of The Five, a vampire hunting group giving him supernatural strengths. Jeremy is killed in the fourth season after Katherine throws him onto Silas, who drains his blood. He is resurrected by Bonnie Bennett, his love interest, in the fourth-season finale. In the sixth season, he leaves Mystic Falls to hunt vampires, unbeknownst to everyone other than Alaric. Jeremy returns to Mystic Falls in the final episode after Elena's curse is broken, and begins working as a teacher at the Salvatore Boarding School for the Young & Gifted that Alaric and Caroline open.
- Sara Canning as Jenna Sommers (seasons 1–2; guest seasons 3, 5 & 8), Elena and Jeremy's aunt and legal guardian after the death of their parents. Though she is young, she strives to be a role model to Elena and Jeremy and look after them. She dates Alaric after he moves to town in the middle of the first season. Jenna was killed in season two during Klaus' hybrid ritual after being turned into a vampire.
- Kat Graham as Bonnie Bennett, Bonnie is a powerful witch and close friend of Elena and Caroline. She learns to control her powers with the guidance of her grandmother, Sheila "Grams" Bennett, a fellow witch. Throughout the series, Bonnie repeatedly dies and returns to life, while also losing and regaining her magical abilities. She frequently uses her powers to help her friends. Although initially hostile toward vampires, particularly Damon, she gradually grows closer to them. She and Damon become best friends after spending four months trapped together in a prison world during season six. Bonnie has an intermittent relationship with Elena's brother, Jeremy, from seasons two through five and later becomes romantically involved with Enzo. In season seven, she inherits Rayna Cruz's hunter's curse, endangering her vampire friends. In the series finale, Bonnie breaks Elena's sleeping spell and leaves Mystic Falls to travel the world.
- Candice King as Caroline Forbes, Elena and Bonnie's best friend, who used to be insecure and sometimes jealous of Elena for the attention she received, often feeling second best. After turning into a vampire in the second season, she becomes more caring and sympathetic. Neurotic but lovable, Caroline has been the love interest of many of the male characters. She initially serves as Damon's plaything in the first season, which she hates him for, but they later become friends. Afterwards, she has serious relationships with Matt, Tyler, Alaric, and Stefan. She was long the subject of Klaus's adoration, whom she sleeps with in the fifth season, too. Caroline gives birth to Alaric and Jo's twin daughters after becoming pregnant with them through a spell cast by the Gemini Coven and becomes their mother, as Jo is killed in the seventh season. She married Stefan shortly before his death in the eighth season and repaired her relationship with Damon. Caroline raises the twins with Alaric, who she views as her own; she opens the Salvatore Boarding School for the Young & Gifted with Alaric.
- Zach Roerig as Matt Donovan, Vicki's younger brother and Elena's childhood friend and ex-boyfriend, who became romantically involved with Caroline in the first and second seasons. Matt and Caroline remain good friends even after breaking up during the second season. Matt wants no part in the supernatural events in his town and is later at odds with the vampires as he becomes a police officer and tries to protect the town from them. He becomes the sheriff in the eighth season and plans to run for mayor.
- Kayla Ewell as Vicki Donovan (season 1; recurring seasons 3 & 8; guest seasons 2 & 5), Matt's drug-addicted older sister. She appears to be dating Tyler but is also interested in Jeremy. She is quite insecure about herself, being poor and an outsider. She is turned into a vampire by Damon and is killed by Stefan shortly after due to her getting out of control and attacking Elena. Following the destruction of the Other Side, the supernatural limbo where she resided after her death, Vicki was sent to Hell.
- Michael Trevino as Tyler Lockwood (seasons 1–6; guest seasons 7–8), a werewolf, later turned into a hybrid by Klaus, Matt's best friend and the son of the mayor of Mystic Falls. His family carry a lycanthropic trait, being descended from an ancient werewolf clan. His father, the mayor, had the gene but did not trigger the curse. His uncle Mason was also a triggered werewolf, who was killed by Damon in the second season. Tyler was turned into the first successful hybrid by Klaus. In the fifth-season finale, he is returned to just being a human. He reactivates his werewolf gene and leaves town at the end of the sixth season. He appears in a couple of episodes of the seventh season, protecting Elena's coffin.
- Matt Davis as Alaric Saltzman (seasons 1–3, 6–8; guest seasons 4–5), a history teacher, vampire hunter and Jenna's love interest in the first two seasons. Davis left the show at the end of season three after Alaric was killed. His character returned as a regular from the sixth season onwards, after he was resurrected in the fifth season. His vampirism is stripped away by magic, turning him into a human once again, after being saved by Josette Laughlin (Jodi Lyn O'Keefe); the two begin dating. Jo becomes pregnant and they plan to marry, but she is murdered by her brother Malachai at their wedding. The Gemini coven, Jo's witch family, was able to transfer the babies to Caroline's womb, and she gives birth to Alaric and Jo's twin daughters - Josie and Lizzie named after their biological mother Josette and Carolines' mother Elizabeth. Caroline and Alaric move to Dallas together and begin a relationship, but end it when Caroline decides to be with Stefan after his return at the end of the seventh season. Alaric establishes the Salvatore Boarding School for the Young & Gifted with Caroline, with whom he raises the twins, as Jo watches over him from the afterlife.
- Joseph Morgan as Klaus Mikaelson (seasons 3–4, recurring season 2; guest seasons 5 & 7), the Original Hybrid, who begins to build an army of new "hybrids", which are half vampire and half werewolf. During the third season, Klaus began to develop feelings for Caroline and falls in love with her. Klaus eventually moves to New Orleans where his character is the lead in the spin-off show The Originals.
- Michael Malarkey as Enzo St. John (seasons 6–8; recurring season 5), a vampire formerly under the imprisonment of the Augustine society. He was Damon Salvatore's cellmate back in the 1950s when the latter was captured by the Augustines. He and Damon revived their friendship as he searched for his lost lover, Maggie. In the fifth-season episode "Man on Fire", Enzo shut off his humanity after finding out the truth about Maggie's death. He is later killed by Stefan, having his heart ripped out. He was resurrected in the fifth-season finale and becomes Bonnie's love interest, before coming under the control of the monster in the vault at the end of the seventh season. He is killed by a humanity-less Stefan in the eighth season having his heart ripped out again. He watches over Bonnie in the afterlife.

== Episodes ==
Season	Episodes	Originally released	
Season	Episodes	First released	Last released
1	22	September 10, 2009	May 13, 2010
2	22	September 9, 2010	May 12, 2011
3	22	September 15, 2011	May 10, 2012
4	23	October 11, 2012	May 16, 2013
5	22	October 3, 2013	May 15, 2014
6	22	October 2, 2014	May 14, 2015
7	22	October 8, 2015	May 13, 2016
8	16	October 21, 2016	March 10, 2017

== Production ==
Initially, Kevin Williamson had little interest in developing the series, as he found the premise too similar to the Twilight novels. However, at the urging of Julie Plec, he began to read the books. He started to become intrigued by the story: "I began to realize that it was a story about a small town, about that town's underbelly and about what lurks under the surface." Williamson has stated the town's story will be the main focus of the series rather than high school.

On February 6, 2009, Variety announced that the CW had green-lit the pilot for The Vampire Diaries with Williamson and Julie Plec set as the head writers, executive producers, and showrunners. On May 19, 2009, the series was officially ordered for the 2009–2010 season.

The pilot episode was filmed in Vancouver, British Columbia. However, the rest of the seasons have been filmed in Covington, Georgia (which doubles as the show's fictional small town of Mystic Falls, Virginia) and various other communities around Greater Atlanta to take advantage of local tax incentives. On the morning of May 10, 2012, a fire broke out in the building on Clark Street in Covington that was used as the setting for Mystic Grill on the show.

The series was given a full 22-episode order on October 21, 2009, after strong ratings for the first half of the season. On February 16, 2010, the CW announced that it had renewed the show for a second season, which premiered on September 9, 2010. On April 26, 2011, the CW renewed the show for a third season. The third season premiered on September 15, 2011. The fourth season premiered on October 11, 2012. the CW renewed the show for a fifth season on February 11, 2013. On February 13, 2014, the CW renewed the series for a sixth season. On January 11, 2015, the CW renewed the series for a seventh season.

On April 6, 2015, lead actress Nina Dobrev confirmed that she and co-star Michael Trevino (who plays Tyler Lockwood) would be leaving the show after its sixth season. Dobrev returned to record a voiceover for the seventh-season finale and returned as a guest star in the series finale. Trevino appeared as a guest star in the seventh and eighth seasons.

In 2025, Dobrev stated that, even though she was the main character of the show, her salary was less than Wesley's and Somerhalder's.

On March 11, 2016, the CW renewed the series for an eighth season, but on July 23, 2016, announced that the eighth season, consisting of 16 episodes, would be the show's last. The final season began airing on October 21, 2016, and ended March 10, 2017. CW president Mark Pedowitz said in an interview at the summer TCA's that The Vampire Diaries didn't receive an extra episode order for the second season at the request of Williamson. Williamson felt to do the best show possible; he would rather do 22 episodes. "I'd rather have a great 22 than a good 24 if Kevin couldn't do it," he explained. The writers first met for the fifth season on April 15, 2013. Filming began on July 10, 2013, and finished on April 10, 2014. On July 23, 2016, it was announced that the show would end after a 16-episode eighth season.

== Reception ==
=== Critical response ===
Critical response of The Vampire Diaries
Season	Rotten Tomatoes	Metacritic
1	73% (30 reviews)	57 (31 reviews)
2	100% (12 reviews)	78 (5 reviews)
3	90% (10 reviews)	—N/a
4	69% (16 reviews)	—N/a
5	100% (13 reviews)	—N/a
6	81% (16 reviews)	—N/a
7	77% (13 reviews)	—N/a
8	100% (16 reviews)	—N/a

Reviews for The Vampire Diaries were initially mixed but improved significantly through the course of the show. Metacritic gave the show a score of 57 (out of 100) based on reviews from 31 critics, indicating "mixed or average reviews". Entertainment Weekly gave the pilot a B+, declaring that the show "signals a welcome return to form for writer-producer Kevin Williamson". Reviewer, Ken Tucker, ended his review by writing that "Diaries promises us a season of sharp-tongued amusement." Linda Stasi of the New York Post gave the premiere a perfect score, saying that she was "hooked after one episode". Stasi praised the pacing of the episode and the "vicious, bloody vamp action," which "starts in the opening scene and continues throughout The Vampire Diaries with such ferocity and speed that it's truly scary." Conversely, San Francisco Chronicle's Tim Goodman, gave the episode a highly critical review, calling the series "awful". Goodman disliked the dialogue and hoped that the extras on Buffy the Vampire Slayer would "return en masse to eat the cast of Vampire Diaries, plus any remaining scripts."

Many TV critics felt the series improved with each episode. Sarah Hughes of The Independent says The Vampire Diaries turns into "a well-crafted, interestingly developed series" despite a mediocre opening episode. The New York Post also praised the portrayal of Elena, finding the character to be a strong-minded woman who did not allow her feelings for her boyfriend to control her. Karla Peterson of The San Diego Union-Tribune said that "the supernatural drama is a first-class production, featuring an insanely gorgeous cast, sharp scripts, and a brooding vibe that is hard for even the most levelheaded adult to resist." Mike Hale of The New York Times gave the series an honorable mention on his list of the top TV shows of 2009.

The show's second season opened to favorable reviews. On Metacritic, it has a score of 78 (out of 100) based on reviews from five critics, indicating "generally favorable reviews". As the series progressed and developed into the third season, critics praised the portrayals of the main characters and the development of the female characters such as Elena Gilbert played by Nina Dobrev, Bonnie Bennett played by Kat Graham and Caroline Forbes played by Candice King.

The third-season finale, "The Departed", received critical acclaim. Diana Steenbergen of IGN praised the episode and the writers for clearing up a couple of storylines and making all of them come to a head. She also praised Dobrev's performance in this episode, addressing her behavior as another reason the final revelation from Meredith was more shocking and believable. Similarly, Mandi Bierly of Entertainment Weekly review praised the writers' skills in creating a more unexpected final twist.

=== Ratings ===
The series premiere of The Vampire Diaries on September 11, 2009, was the CW's biggest ever at the time, amassing 4.91 million viewers. Adding in DVR numbers, the ratings for the premiere swelled to an official 5.7 million viewers. In 2016, a New York Times study of the 50 TV shows with the most Facebook Likes found that "as with several other shows that focus on the supernatural," The Vampire Diaries was "slightly more popular outside of cities. That said, the show's fandom has the smallest amount of spatial variation of all 50 shows".

The following is a table for the seasonal rankings based on average total estimated viewers per episode of The Vampire Diaries. "Rank" refers to how The Vampire Diaries rated compared to the other television series, which aired during prime time hours.

Viewership and ratings per season of The Vampire Diaries
Season	Timeslot (ET)	Episodes	First aired		Last aired		TV season	Viewership rank	Avg. viewers (millions)
Season	Timeslot (ET)	Episodes	Date	Viewers (millions)	Date	Viewers (millions)	TV season	Viewership rank	Avg. viewers (millions)
1	Thursday 8:00 pm	22	September 10, 2009	4.91	May 13, 2010	3.47	2009–10	116	3.60
2	Thursday 8:00 pm	22	September 9, 2010	3.36	May 12, 2011	2.86	2010–11	193	3.17
3	Thursday 8:00 pm	22	September 15, 2011	3.10	May 10, 2012	2.53	2011–12	166	2.91
4	Thursday 8:00 pm	23	October 11, 2012	3.18	May 16, 2013	2.24	2012–13	133	2.97
5	Thursday 8:00 pm	22	October 3, 2013	2.59	May 15, 2014	1.61	2013–14	147	2.68
6	Thursday 8:00 pm	22	October 2, 2014	1.81	May 14, 2015	1.44	2014–15	160	1.54
7	Thursday 8:00 pm (1–9); Friday 8:00 pm (10–22)	22	October 8, 2015	1.38	May 13, 2016	1.04	2015–16	141	1.95
8	Friday 8:00 pm	16	October 21, 2016	0.98	March 10, 2017	1.15	2016–17	140	1.71

== Home media releases ==
Season one was released on DVD in Regions 1, 2, and 4. Also, on Blu-ray in Regions A and B. Both United States versions include commentary by cast and crew members on selected episodes, deleted scenes, behind-the-scenes featurettes, webisodes and a downloadable audiobook of L.J. Smith's The Vampire Diaries: The Awakening. It was released on DVD in Region 2 on August 23, 2010. Following that release, Region 1 began selling DVDs on August 31, 2010, and Region 3 on September 1, 2010. In Region A, it was released on Blu-ray on August 31, 2010. Region B's releases varied; the United Kingdom on August 23, 2010, Brazil on August 26, 2010, and Australia on September 1, 2010.

The Vampire Diaries Season 2 will be available on DVD and Blu-ray on August 30, 2011. Region B's releases varied; the United Kingdom on August 22, 2011, Brazil on August 25, 2011. The Vampire Diaries: Season 3 will be available on DVD and Blu-ray on September 11 and A and on September 5, 2012, for Regions 4 and B. The Vampire Diaries: Season 4 was available on DVD and Blu-ray as of September 15, 2013.

In Japan, the fourth season was released in a special collection, including bonuses not available elsewhere. Included in the collection are an ankle bracelet, promotional image cards and a booklet about the cast.

Season	DVD release date			Blu-ray release date			
Season	DVD release date			Region A		Region B	
Season	Region 1	Region 2	Region 4	United States	Canada	United Kingdom	Australia
1	August 31, 2010	August 23, 2010	September 1, 2010	August 31, 2010	August 31, 2010	August 23, 2010	September 1, 2010
2	August 30, 2011	August 22, 2011	September 7, 2011	August 30, 2011	August 30, 2011	August 22, 2011	September 7, 2011
1–2		August 22, 2011	November 9, 2011			August 22, 2011	
3	September 11, 2012	August 20, 2012	October 3, 2012	September 11, 2012	September 11, 2012	August 20, 2012	October 3, 2012
1–3		August 20, 2012	October 17, 2012			August 20, 2012	October 3, 2012
4	September 3, 2013	August 26, 2013	October 2, 2013	September 3, 2013	September 3, 2013	August 26, 2013	October 2, 2013
1–4		August 26, 2013	October 2, 2013			August 26, 2013	October 2, 2013
5	September 9, 2014	October 27, 2014	September 24, 2014	September 9, 2014	September 9, 2014	October 27, 2014	September 24, 2014
1–5		October 27, 2014	October 1, 2014			October 27, 2014	
6	September 1, 2015	October 26, 2015	September 9, 2015	September 1, 2015	September 1, 2015	October 26, 2015	September 9, 2015
1–6		October 26, 2015	September 26, 2015	October 26, 2015	October 26, 2015	October 26, 2015	September 23, 2015
7	August 16, 2016	October 24, 2016	August 24, 2016	August 16, 2016	August 16, 2016	October 24, 2016	August 24, 2016
1–7	N/A	October 24, 2016	N/A	October 24, 2016	October 24, 2016	October 24, 2016	
8	June 13, 2017	October 23, 2017	June 14, 2017	June 13, 2017	June 13, 2017	October 23, 2017	June 14, 2017
1–8	June 13, 2017	October 23, 2017	June 14, 2017	June 13, 2017	June 13, 2017	October 23, 2017	June 14, 2017

== Spin-off ==
Former president of entertainment at the CW, Dawn Ostroff, mentioned a spin-off idea in 2010 that she said could happen in a few years. A spin-off was in development to debut in the 2011–12 United States network television schedule, but due to Williamson's commitment to The Secret Circle, it was put on hold indefinitely.

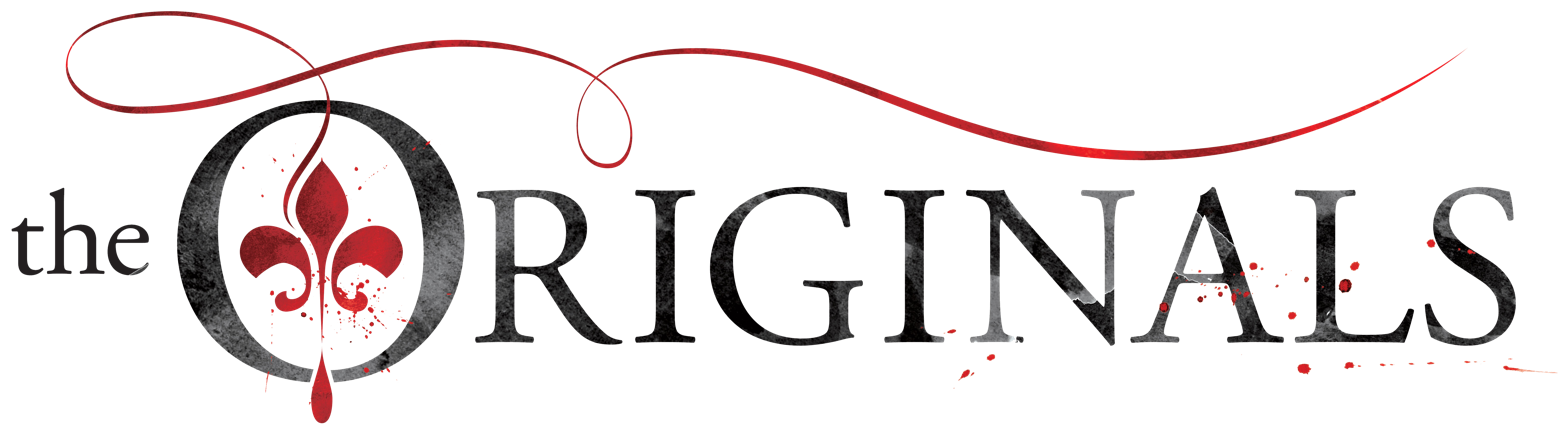
Logo of The Originals

On January 11, 2013, it was announced that a back-door pilot focused on the Originals, starring Joseph Morgan as Klaus and titled The Originals, would air on April 25 for a potential series pick-up for the 2013–2014 season. This second spin-off attempt was carried out by Julie Plec with no involvement by Williamson.

On April 26, 2013, the CW announced that The Originals had been ordered to the series premiere in the 2013–14 television season. The Originals premiered on October 3, 2013.

The Originals is about the Mikaelson siblings, who are the original family of vampires, and their take-over of the French Quarter of New Orleans. The show also involves Hayley and Klaus's daughter, Hope.

Producers reported that there would be a transition of the characters in both series. Claire Holt made a special cameo in The Vampire Diaries, in the episodes "I Know What You Did Last Summer" and "500 Years of Solitude". Michael Trevino made a special cameo on episodes of The Originals, "Bloodletting" and "The River in Reverse". Joseph Morgan, Daniel Gillies and Claire Holt returned to The Vampire Diaries in a special cameo on the series' 100th episode "500 Years of Solitude". Nina Dobrev also appeared in the fifth episode of The Originals' second season, "Red Door", as Tatia, another doppelgänger. Joseph Morgan also returned for the crossover episode "Moonlight on the Bayou" with Paul Wesley appearing on the same crossover episode "A Streetcar Named Desire" in The Originals.

At the Television Critics Association winter 2016 press tour, CW president Mark Pedowitz announced an official crossover between The Vampire Diaries and The Originals, where Stefan goes on the run and finds a haven in New Orleans where he runs into Klaus.

== Tie-in material ==
On October 31, 2013, DC Comics launched a comic book series based on the TV show.

== See also ==
- List of vampire television series
- Vampire film
