= Roberto Verino =

Spanish fashion designer

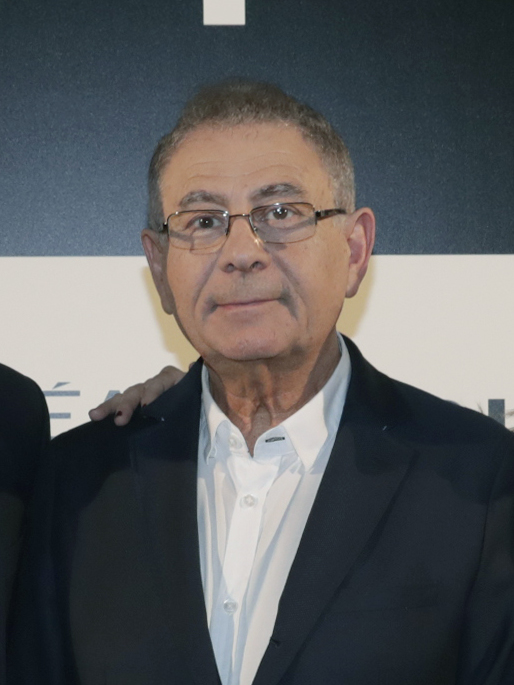
- Verino in 2017
- Born: Manuel Roberto Mariño; 3 May 1945; Verín
- Citizenship: Spain
- Education: Beaux-Arts de Paris
- Occupation: fashion designer
- Awards: Castelao Medal, Gold Medal of Merit in the Fine Arts
- Website: http://www.robertoverino.com

Roberto Verino (born on 3 May, 1945, as Manuel Roberto Mariño) is a Spanish fashion designer. In 1982, he founded the couture brand Verino.

== Biography ==
Manuel Roberto Mariño was born on 3 May, 1945 in the Spanish town of Verín. He referred to his birthplace name (Verín) to create his artist name (Verino). He studied at the Beaux-Arts de Paris. He returned to Spain to take possession of his family's clothing company. In 1982, he introduced his first assortment of ready-to-wear clothing for women. He sold his family's company to El Corte Inglés and opened his first eponymous store in Madrid in 1992, releasing his first perfume the same year. He made distribution agreements with Harrods and Saks Fifth Avenue.

In 1998, he cofounded the Asociación de Creadores de la Moda de España. In 1999, with the fashion designers Jesús del Pozo, Ángel Schlesser and Antonio Pernas, he started a boycott of the Pasarela Cibeles fashion competition (now Madrid Fashion Week) for "cronyism and lack of criteria". The designers decided to show their collections on their own, without the power of the Pasarela Cibeles. He came back to Cibeles in 2002.

His legacy work was exhibited at the Museo del Traje in 2007 and at the Gabarron Foundation in New York in 2008. In 2009, he designed the Getafe CF's night suits worn by the team on special events. In 2010, he designed a Coca-Cola Light bottle to celebrate the brand's 25th anniversary.

Roberto Verino is also a viticulturist, and the owner of the domain Terra do Gargalo in the Monterrei (DO) since 1998.

His company opened an office in Mexico in 2016, and started to expand throughout Latin America in 2019. In 2021, he conceded the creative direction of his company to his daughter Cristina Mariño, and the executive management to Dora Casal, consequently, stepping back from daily operations.

== Style ==
In a 2002 collection, Verino used floral designs that were borrowed from Georgia O'Keeffe.

== Prizes ==
- 1992: Aguja de Oro for best Spanish designer
- 2001 : Man of the Year, fashion designer category, by Spanish GQ
- 2008: Gold Medal of Merit in the Fine Arts
