= Mr. Box Office =

- Genre: Sitcom
- Created by: Byron Allen
- Starring: Bill Bellamy; Jon Lovitz; Vivica A. Fox; Tim Meadows; Jeffrey Garcia; Gary Busey; Rick Fox; Essence Atkins; Tony T. Roberts
- Country of origin: United States
- Original language: English
- No. of seasons: 2
- No. of episodes: 36 (list of episodes)

Production
- Executive producers: Byron Allen; Scott Satin; Carolyn Folks; Jennifer Lucas; Bill Bellamy; Barry Katz
- Camera setup: Videotape; Multi-camera
- Running time: 19 minutes
- Production company: Entertainment Studios

Original release
- Network: First-run syndication
- Release: September 22, 2012 – April 25, 2015

Mr. Box Office is an American sitcom that debuted in first-run syndication on September 22, 2012. The show was created by Byron Allen and produced by his production company Entertainment Studios.

== Plot ==
The series centers on movie star Marcus Jackson (Bill Bellamy), who ends up getting sentenced to community service after engaging in an altercation with a paparazzi, forcing Marcus to put his film career on hold. Due to the fact that he has a teacher's license (since he originally aspired to work as a teacher), the judge presiding in his case orders him to serve a six-month stint as a teacher for underprivileged high school kids in South Los Angeles. As a result, Marcus has to deal with his agent Bobby Gold (Jon Lovitz), constantly trying to get him back into film. However, he discovers that Marcus has decided to remain working at the school, and help improve his students. Marcus also deals with the mishaps of his best friends and roommates Tony (Tony T. Roberts) and Jamal (Alex Thomas).

== Cast ==
=== Main cast ===
- Bill Bellamy – Marcus Jackson
- Jon Lovitz – Bobby Gold
- Alex Thomas – Jamal Tayor
- Tony T. Roberts – Tony "The Tiger"
- Vivica A. Fox – Cassandra Washington
- Tim Meadows – Principal Theodore Martin
- Rick Fox – Andrew Thompson (episodes 1–23)
- Gary Busey – John Anderson (episodes 1–23)
- Essence Atkins – Samantha Owens
- Jeff Garcia – Freddy Lopez (season 2; recurring season 1)

=== Recurring cast ===
- Davi Santos – Carlos
- Nick Nervies – Milton
- Giovonnie Samuels – Camille
- Erinn Westbrook – Danielle
- Marcus T. Paulk – Jimmy
- Giselle Bonilla – Maria
- Tequan Richmond – Anthony

=== Special guest cast ===
- Keshia Knight Pulliam – Vanessa Owens (replaced with Essence Atkins after the pilot episode)

== Episodes ==
Season	Episodes	Originally released	
Season	Episodes	First released	Last released
1	26	September 22, 2012	August 16, 2013
2	10	November 22, 2013	April 25, 2015

== Production ==
Mr. Box Office is primarily syndicated to stations affiliated with The CW and MyNetworkTV and to independent stations for broadcast in weekend primetime timeslots. The series was originally slated to produce a total of 104 episodes, borrowing a similarly-formatted episode order as several sitcoms produced and distributed by Debmar-Mercury, such as Tyler Perry's House of Payne and Anger Management, in which the vast majority of the episodes would be produced in one season.

The series, which was sold as part of a two-hour comedy block with The First Family, was initially picked up by stations owned by Tribune Broadcasting, Weigel Broadcasting and CBS Television Stations. By May 2012, the program had been sold to stations covering approximately 85% of all U.S. markets. Production of the series slowed after the first 28 episodes aired. The series produced less than five new episodes per year in 2014 and 2015.

This show would mark the final live-action television role for Jeffrey Garcia, who would die ten years after the series' conclusion on December 10, 2025.

== Syndication ==
On April 4, 2013, Centric acquired the cable syndication rights to all past and future episodes of The First Family, along with Mr. Box Office, with both series expected to begin airing on the channel starting April 19, 2013.

In Canada, the series aired on M3 and formerly aired on Comedy Gold. The show also airs on TheGrio in the United States.
