= Stefan Salvatore =

Fictional character

- The Vampire Diaries character
- Paul Wesley as Stefan Salvatore
- First appearance: Novels: The Awakening; Television: "Pilot"
- Last appearance: Novels: The Salvation: Unmasked; Television: "I Was Feeling Epic
- Created by: L. J. Smith
- Portrayed by: Paul Wesley; Sawyer Bell (10 years old); Luke Judy (young child)

In-universe information
- Nickname: "Ripper"
- Species: Human (in the past and season 8); Vampire (seasons 1-8) (Note: Remains permanently a vampire within the universe of the books.); Doppelgänger (seasons 1-8) (Note: Only in TV series.)
- Gender: Male
- Occupation: High school student (seasons 1-4); Automobile repairman (season 6)
- Family: Giuseppe Salvatore (father); Damon Salvatore (brother); Lilian Salvatore (mother; TV series)
- Spouse: Caroline Forbes (in TV series)
- Significant others: TV show: Elena Gilbert (ex-girlfriend); Valerie Tulle (ex-girlfriend); Katherine Pierce (ex-lover); Rebekah Mikaelson (ex-girlfriend); Books: Katherine von Swartzschild (former love interest); Elena Gilbert (former love interest) (Note: Elena is Stefano's fiancée in the original timeline, however as result of her time travel in The Salvation: Unmasked their engagement is ceased from the past in the new timeline.)
- Children: 1 (Note: Miscarried child with Valerie Tulle; only within the canon of TV series.)
- Nationality: Italian (books); American with Italian ancestry (TV show)
- Status: Unknown (Note: Stefano dies in The Salvation: Unspoken, but Elena's time travel in The Salvation: Unmasked heavily affects the past and the future; it's never stated whether Stefano is deceased or alive in the new timeline she created.) (books); Deceased (TV series)

Stefan Salvatore, referred to in books as Stefano Salvatore, is a fictional character and one of the two main protagonists from L. J. Smith's novel series The Vampire Diaries. He is portrayed by Paul Wesley in the television series CW's The Vampire Diaries and The Originals. Stefan grew up in the town of Mystic Falls, Virginia. He grew up next to his brother, Damon Salvatore, his father, Giuseppe Salvatore and at the start of his life grew up with his mother, Lillian Salvatore before supposedly dying of consumption, later revealing that she faked her own death and lived as a vampire in secret. As Stefan grew up, he was known as the good child in the family, unlike his brother, Damon Salvatore, who had a knack for trouble. As Stefan and Damon grew up, both boys grew to not like their father because of his abusive ways. Damon Salvatore joined the army, and Stefan was left to live with his father for a couple of months. Once Damon came back, the two were turned into vampires in 1864, in the town of Mystic Falls (Stefan being 17-years-old), by Katerina Petrova, who both brothers loved immensely.

== Casting and reception ==
On March 27, 2009, The Hollywood Reporter announced that Paul Wesley had joined the cast of The Vampire Diaries as Stefan. He was the last main cast member whose casting was announced. Before Wesley's casting, Sebastian Stan auditioned for the role, but backed out due to his commitments to Kings, and Nathaniel Buzolic and Steven Strait were considered. Wesley has become popular with viewers. Carina MacKenzie of the Los Angeles Times noted that he spent "10 years as a successful but under-the-radar TV actor" but shortly after the show premiered, he was "everywhere". MacKenzie wrote: "Last summer his face was on more than 30 "Vampire Diaries" posters at the Century City/Westfield mall alone, not to mention billboards over seemingly every major boulevard in Hollywood". In November 2011, Wesley's ex-wife Torrey DeVitto joined the cast of The Vampire Diaries in the recurring role of Dr. Meredith Fell, who is "intrigued by" Alaric Saltzman (Matt Davis).

== Development ==
=== Characterization ===
Stefan was described as a "beautiful young man" who turns out to be a 162 years old Vampire, who develops a "strong connection" with "tragic heroine" Elena Gilbert (Nina Dobrev). Wesley described the young Stefan as "naive and willing to ride whatever wave life threw" him, because he was "easily manipulated" and "innocent" with a "beautiful young soul". However, Stefan at the age of 160 years has more wisdom in him. Stefan consumes animal blood, refusing to kill humans out of guilt for killing his own father. Damon on the other hand, does feed on humans.

Paul Wesley has remained close friends with his co-stars Dobrev and Somerhalder, and is business partners with the latter.

=== Relationships ===
Stefan has a love-hate relationship with his brother, Damon Salvatore (Ian Somerhalder). Wesley "adores" Somerhalder, who he said he has "natural chemistry" with. Wesley stated: "The dynamic of the characters is so interesting because they love each other, but they hate each other [...] There's always this thing in Stefan's head where he hopes that one day Damon can just be as normal and functioning as possible". However, he also described their relationship as "beautiful" in their flashbacks from the past, because they "loved each other so much back then". Stefan begins a romance with Elena on the show's first episode, without telling her he was a vampire. She was later shocked to find out that he was a vampire, and briefly ended their relationship before getting back together. As the show progressed, Elena began developing feelings for Damon as well. Wesley described Damon and Stefan as having a "silent understanding of the fact that they both are in love with the same girl", and "that was Stefan's girl, and now Damon is suddenly a real factor, he's really in the picture". Wesley's favorite episode of The Vampire Diaries is "The Turning Point" because it was "really beautiful" for Stefan and Elena as a couple. In the episode, Stefan turns around "because he's ashamed of his face" with blood rushing through his eyes and his veins popping out. Wesley said "he's terrified, and he hates himself for it. He runs from that part of himself, but she turns him around and tells him not to be afraid. She touches his face, and she thinks he's beautiful. It's so intimate, that moment, because she accepts the darkest part of him."

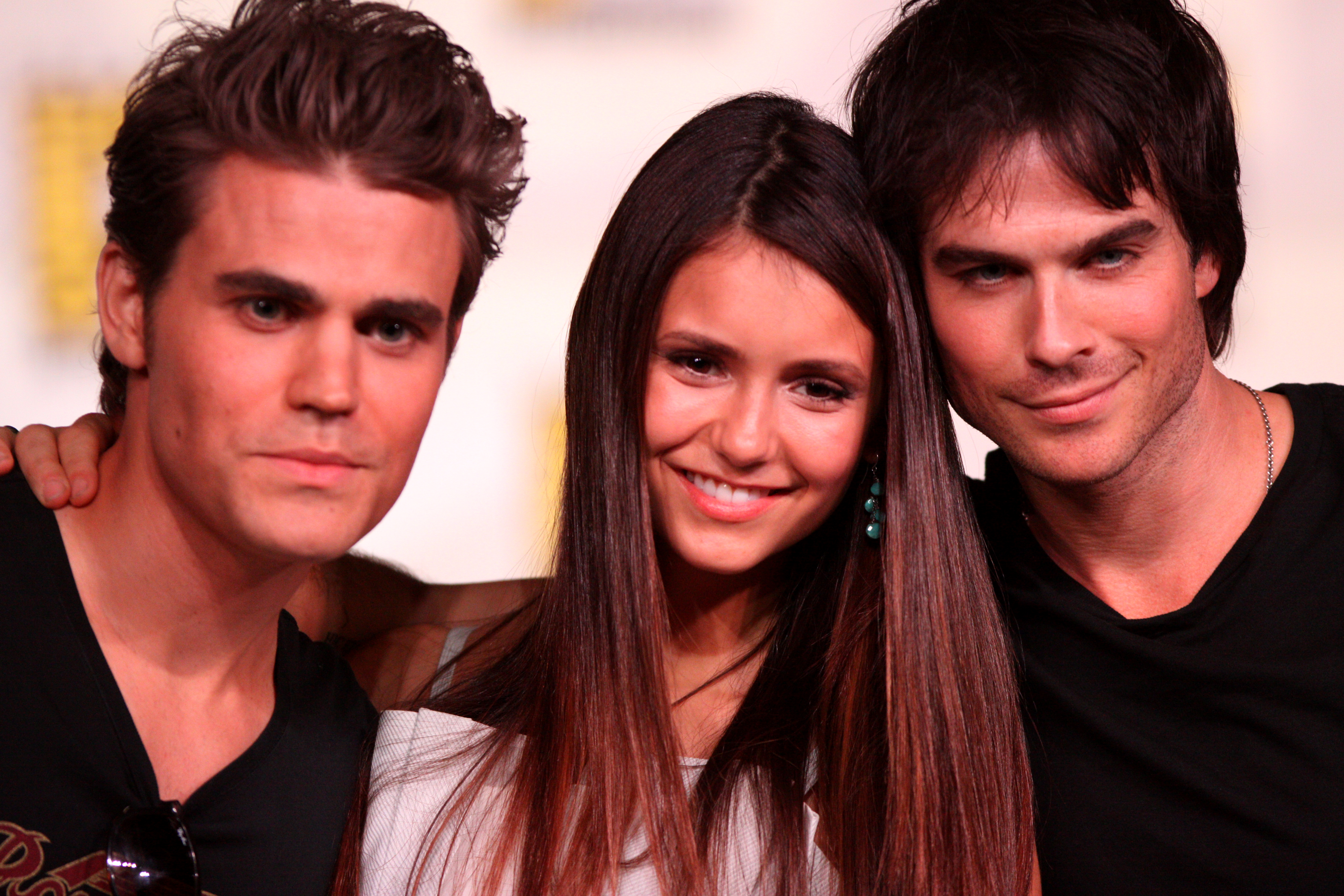
Wesley with Nina Dobrev (Elena) and Ian Somerhalder (Damon).

When the original vampire Klaus Mikaelson (Joseph Morgan) is feared dead, it is revealed that everyone in his bloodline will die, including Stefan and Damon. In what International Business Times called "the moment Vampire Diaries fans have been waiting for", Elena had to pick to say goodbye to Stefan or Damon. She ended up choosing Stefan. When Elena became a vampire, her feelings for Damon heightened, and it was later revealed that she had a sired bond to him. Elena and Stefan broke up, and she began a romance with Damon. Stefan became heartbroken, feeling angry and betrayed, and lashed out at Damon and Elena. Wesley urged fans of Stefan and Elena not to lose hope, stating: "The fans should definitely maintain some hope. The thing to remember is that Stefan and Elena have this love that is so strong, and it was sort of the core of Season 1 — you can't entirely disregard that". The show's head writer, Julie Plec, said "They love each other as deeply as two people can love each other, but that doesn't mean that their relationship is infallible".

=== Blood addiction ===
In 1864, Stefan "hadn't yet learned the careful control that rules his life now" and was an avid consumer of human blood, which was considered a "dark past" by Zap2it. Of his blood addiction, Wesley said: "It's awesome. It's a drug. He's a drug addict. I get to play a drug addict, which I love. I'm going back to his days of usage, heavy usage. When I'm in my lustful state, it's so much fun. I felt like I got to play a role that I'd never played before. I felt like I was doing something different. I just love it, and I hope it comes out the way that I envisioned." The show's executive producer Kevin Williamson revealed that he was "looking forward to Stefan eventually falling off the wagon and drinking human blood again" after spending decades of consuming only animal blood. Wesley said "everybody has a dark side, especially a vampire, and it'd be unrealistic not to explore that". Stefan became addicted to human blood again, but got it under control with the help of Elena, who began letting him feed off her in small amounts to build up discipline.

However, in the show's third season, Stefan's addiction returned. His humanity was taken away by Klaus, and the audience met "The Ripper", his "bloodthirsty, ruthless alter-ego who had previously only been legend" according to Zap2it, who found "this sociopath version of our hero far more compelling than his usual compassionate martyr self". Wesley, who enjoyed "Ripper Stefan" more, said it "bums me out" when Stefan quit human blood again. He said "Good Stefan doesn't feel as natural in terms of what I want to be doing on screen, and what I want to be saying. I feel a little stifled, myself, whenever he's resisting the urge to do vampiresque things."

== Television series ==
=== Backstory ===
Stefan Salvatore was born on November 1, 1846, and raised in Mystic Falls, Virginia to Giuseppe Salvatore and Lily Salvatore. Stefan is the younger brother of Damon. The Salvatore brothers, Stefan and Damon, were human. They were very close and were best friends in life. Damon always confided and trusted in Stefan and they always defended each other, especially in front of their father. Stefan was fiercely loyal to Damon. Although Stefan was only 17 years old, he displayed maturity, responsibility and had wisdom beyond his years. Because of this, Stefan always seemed to be much older than his actual age. However, this all seemed to change when Stefan and Damon fell in love with the same girl, Katherine Pierce, who turned out to be a vampire. Stefan fell deeply in love with Katherine before finding out she was a vampire. Katherine, however, compelled Stefan to not be afraid, to keep her secret and go on as they were. It was also revealed that Katherine compelled Stefan to drink her vampire blood against his will. Damon, on the other hand, drank Katherine's blood willingly, wanting and desiring the immortal life in order to spend an eternity with Katherine. In 1864, Stefan was turned into a vampire after being shot by his father, Giuseppe, along with his brother, Damon with Katherine's blood in his system, before accidentally killing his father during a visit to tell him that he was going to let himself die. Damon, who turned into a vampire as well, promised Stefan an eternity of misery as he was angry that Stefan had forced him to turn and jealous that Katherine had also turned Stefan. A newborn vampire with uncontrollable blood lust, Stefan was unable to resist the temptations of human blood and became severely out of control and addicted (later on known as the Ripper) to the blood, killing many people because of his lack of control and extreme bloodlust. However, Stefan learned to change his ways when he was taught to control it by a vampire named Alexia "Lexi" Branson, who later on became Stefan's best friend and companion. In 1942, Stefan enlisted in the Army to fight in World War II (4x08 "We'll Always Have Bourbon Street"). After decades of absence from the town he called home, Stefan returned to Mystic Falls to visit his home and Zach. On May 23, 2009, Stefan heard the Gilberts' car accident at Wickery Bridge. It was then and there that Stefan fatefully encountered Elena Gilbert for the first time. After only being able to save Elena, Stefan noticed that she looked exactly like Katherine. He would later find out that Elena was Katherine's doppelgänger.

=== Storyline ===
==== Season 1-3 ====
Stefan and Elena begin a relationship and he revealed to her that he is a vampire. However, Damon returns to Mystic Falls too, and also falls in love with Elena. Further on in the series, Damon and Stefan start to bond as brothers again and it becomes apparent that they do love each other. Because of his addiction to human blood, Stefan only drank animal blood in the beginning of the series, which made him weaker than other vampires. In season two, Stefan starts to take small amounts of Elena's blood each day to mitigate its effect on him and to increase his strength. When Katherine returns it is discovered that she had always loved Stefan and not Damon; however, Stefan is in love with Elena and not interested in Katherine. Stefan starts to build a friendship with Caroline Forbes after she is turned into a vampire. After Klaus gives Stefan his blood to save Damon from a werewolf bite, he turns into a Ripper again which he does for his brothers sake.

Stefan starts working for him as he agreed to do to save Damon, and hopes it might also protect Elena by making sure Klaus never returns to Mystic Falls, since he believes her to be dead. Klaus later finds out and compels Stefan to kill her, but when he is able to resist the compulsion, Klaus makes him turn his humanity and emotions off. However, he is later able to get his humanity back, which is seen when he saves Klaus's life to protect Damon, but yet he pretends not to care about Elena anymore. He then takes it upon himself to kill Klaus. He steals Klaus's family as retaliation, and uses them as blackmail, when that fails (the witches give Klaus the coffins when he threatens to end the Bennett line), Stefan threatens to drive Elena off Wickery Bridge with vampire blood in her system if Klaus does not get his hybrids out of town, Klaus agrees at the last minute. He and Elena get into a fight. In the season three finale, he kisses Elena. In the end, Elena chooses Stefan over Damon, but when Rebekah causes Matt's truck to drive off Wickery Bridge, she is trapped underwater. Stefan barely gets there in time, but Elena makes him save Matt first and she drowns. It is later revealed Dr. Fell gave Elena vampire blood, meaning she died with vampire blood in her system, turning her into a vampire.

==== Season 4 ====
In the season four premiere, Stefan tries to get Bonnie to save Elena from becoming a full vampire, however, she along with several other vampires are captured by the Founder's Council. As Elena begins to die and out of desperation to keep Elena alive, Stefan kills a guard and uses his blood to allow Elena to feed and to complete her transition into a vampire. Stefan gives Elena a daylight ring, which was made by Bonnie, in order to protect Elena from the sun. Stefan tries to assure Elena that everything will be okay and that they'll take Elena's newborn vampirism one day at a time. During the second episode of season 4, Stefan tries to help Elena cope with her hunger for human blood. After his "bunny diet" disagrees with Elena stomach she seeks help from Damon to find an alternative blood source. When blood bags and Damon's own blood fails too, she ends up feeding on Matt under extreme circumstances. Stefan then discovers from Klaus and Rebekah that there is a possible cure for vampirism. Stefan "teams" up with Klaus in order to find the possible cure, so that Stefan can give Elena the choice of becoming human again.

Unfortunately, Klaus needs the vampire hunter Connor to stay alive because he holds the map to the cure in his tattoo, and Stefan must keep him alive at all costs when everyone else wants him dead. When Connor kidnaps Jeremy, April, and Matt, and keeps them hostage at the Grill, Stefan must stop Damon from rashly walking in and killing his chance at curing Elena. After tranquilizing Damon with vervain and taking his daylight ring, Stefan tries to take matters into his own hands and infiltrates the Grill by himself. With Jeremy at gunpoint, Elena comes in and takes Connor by surprise. Stefan manages to get Connor out, but Elena later kills him and is consumed with grief at being a murderer.

When Elena begins to hallucinate because of Connor's death, Klaus informs Stefan and Damon that she must be locked away to keep from killing herself, and kidnaps her before they can say no. Later, Stefan works with one of Klaus's hybrids, Chris, to free Elena who stabs him in the neck and runs away. Stefan sends Damon to find her and goes with Bonnie to see if the Professor Shane knows how to end the hallucinations. He informs them that a potential hunter must kill a vampire so he may take the place of that dead hunter, which is virtually impossible. Luckily, Stefan realizes that Jeremy is a potential hunter, and tells him that to save his sister, he must kill a vampire. Jeremy kills the hybrid Chris who originally helped them free Elena, and in turn her hallucinations end, and she is safe, but only barely.

Later, Stefan breaks up with Elena because of her feelings for Damon. Stefan goes to Caroline for support since she loathes Damon, and they become closer. During the Miss Mystic Falls Pageant, Stefan turns a criminal in the hospital and convinces Jeremy to kill him to make the hunter's mark on his arm grow. Afterward, Jeremy becomes anti-vampire and attempts to kill Elena. Stefan is there and saves her, but has to apologize for making him crazy. Elena tries to tell him that she does not need the cure if it means it hurts Jeremy.

That night Elena comes to stay at the Salvatore house, and Stefan leaves to crash at Caroline's. While there, he and Caroline realize that Elena is sired to Damon. When Stefan informs Damon of this, they go to New Orleans to find the witch that broke a sire bond years ago that Damon had. Stefan and Damon learn that in order to break the bond, Damon has to convince Elena not to care about him, and leave him, which Damon agrees to do for Stefan. Post Jeremy's death, Damon convinces Elena to switch off her humanity leading to her becoming brutal and ruthless. Stefan and Damon try constantly to make her feel something again. Later after Elena's humanity comes back, she chooses Damon, leaving Stefan heartbroken. Then Stefan tries to dump Silas' body in the river only to find that Silas is still alive. Silas then reveals that Stefan is his doppelganger. Silas was the one who created the immortality spell 2000 years ago however, as nature creates a balance for everything, it created a version of Silas that could be killed, a shadow-self which ends up being Stefan. Silas then locks Stefan into a vault and drowns him in the river. This incident tempts Stefan to turn his humanity off in order to escape. Stefan happens to be in the safe for 3 months where he keeps on hallucinating.

==== Season 5 ====
In season 5, Damon and Elena manage to figure out that Silas has taken Stefan's place and that Stefan is in that safe. When they go to rescue him, Stefan is not there. Instead, a very powerful witch (Qyetsiyah) had opened the safe for him and fried his brain due to which he suffers from amnesia. Qyetsiyah (or Tessa) loved Silas but on the day of their marriage, he cheated on her and took the immortality spell for the women he actually loved, Amara, the original doppelgänger of Elena. Stefan returns to his old ways but when he saves Elena from Tessa, she wants revenge so he gives Stefan his memories back which gives Stefan hallucinations of the safe. Caroline tries to help him but when that does not work, Katherine comes back in the picture and manages to cure Stefan but they have a one-night stand, which leads Katherine to believe that Stefan still loves her, however he rejects her. Later on, Katherine takes over Elena's body and breaks up with Damon so that she can get Stefan. After trying to woo him and failing, Stefan realizes that Katherine is pretending to be Elena and Elena is with Nadia, Katherine's daughter. They rescue her somehow by killing Katherine and sending her to some sort of hell. Then Stefan volunteers himself to the travellers to give his blood as they needed doppelganger blood. Caroline and Enzo try to find and kill Tom Avery, Stefan's last doppelganger in order to save Stefan and they succeed, bringing Stefan and Caroline even closer. Near the end of the season, Stefan and Elena keep seeing dreams of the two being together and of them as humans. They work out that the travellers planted those dreams there as it was always meant to be Stefan and Elena not Damon and Elena. Through the fight, Stefan and Elena are kidnapped by the travellers as they need their blood to finish their spell. However, Enzo and Caroline save them by killing Tom Avery, Stefan's doppelgänger. In 5x21, Stefan tries to save Caroline's life from Tyler (while a passenger, Julian, is in his body), during which Tyler kills him, sending him to the disintegrating Other Side. In the episode 'Home' he is resurrected because Liv did a spell due to which he and his other friends can get back but Damon and Bonnie are left there leaving everyone broken.

==== Season 6 ====
In season 6, Stefan moves away from Mystic Falls because of Damon's death and finds a new girlfriend called Ivy. However, Enzo and Caroline, find him and Caroline tells Stefan that he's a coward and the worst friend ever. She starts crying so Enzo goes and kills Ivy. Stefan vows revenge. He comes back to Whitmore, and uses Elena's help to find Enzo leaving him to be killed by a vampire hunter. However, Enzo survives. Ivy returns as a vampire and it is revealed that Enzo had fed her vampire blood against her will before killing her. Damon, then returns to Mystic Falls and meets Stefan first which brings Stefan back to his friends. To make things worse, Enzo tells the other vampire hunter about Ivy and all the other vampires and the vampire hunter kills Ivy but is killed by Damon before the vampire hunter would kill anyone else. Enzo, figures out that Stefan's niece, Sarah is alive and that Damon had thought that he had killed Sarah before she was born but Sarah was born before her mother died however, Stefan kept this from Damon and Enzo uses this against Stefan. Meanwhile, the vampires have another threat, a psycho killer, Kai. Added on top of that, Sheriff Liz Forbes (Caroline's mother) is diagnosed with cancer. Stefan supports Caroline through this in which they bond even more and share a passionate kiss however just then Liz dies. At the funeral, Stefan realizes that he has fallen in love with Caroline but before he can confess, Caroline switches off her humanity switch after the funeral. Stefan and Elena try to bring Caroline back but it fails and Caroline vows revenge for them not giving her the year she wanted without any feelings. She kidnaps Stefan and Damon's niece, Sarah Salvatore, and blackmails Stefan to turn off his humanity to save her. At the end of the episode 'The Downward Spiral', he does and joins Caroline. Stefan decides to ruin Caroline's life because she has done the same to him. He wants her to lose control and become a Ripper. He eventually is able to and they sleep together for the first time.

When Lily, Stefan and Damon's mother, is rescued from the 1903 prison world and turns out to be a vampire, she manages to turn on Stefan's humanity again. However, it later is revealed that Lily lied to get him back and does not love her sons anymore and only wants her travelling companions back. Stefan then pretends to still have his emotions off to get Caroline back and somehow succeeds, but Caroline tries to avoid him as she feels guilty for everything she had done. Stefan then also tries to talk Damon out of being a human again only to be with Elena but Damon decides to take the cure. However, during Alaric and Jo's wedding, Kai returns and kills Jo, cursing Elena into an eternal sleep.

==== Season 7 ====
Stefan is forced to deal with the return of his mother and her divided loyalties to her companions, the Heretics, and her family. Lily ultimately kills herself in a failed effort to take out Julian, the leader of the Heretics who brings in an army of vampires to take over Mystic Falls. Stefan is also reunited with his long-lost love Valerie who is one of the Heretics, vampires who were able to retain their original witch abilities. With Valerie's help, Stefan kills Julian, but he becomes a target of the Vampire Hunter Rayna Cruz who has eight lives.

During this time, Stefan is killed by Rayna twice and trapped inside of the Phoenix Stone. Bonnie and Valerie are able to resurrect him both times, but the second time, Stefan gets trapped within a corpse while his own body is possessed by the spirit of Ambrose, a sadistic vampire and serial killer. Stefan's friends save him once again, but his relationship with Valerie is brought to a final end.

Stefan also has to deal with Matt Donovan's extreme hatred of vampires and Stefan in particular which results in Matt betraying his former friend to Rayna. While reluctantly working together to hunt down vampires that had escaped from the Phoenix Stone, Matt reveals to Stefan that he believes that Stefan had murdered his fiancé Penny during a time that Stefan had returned to Mystic Falls on the anniversary of Sheriff Forbes' death despite being banished from town. Stefan finally reveals that, in truth, Matt had accidentally killed Penny and Stefan had erased his memories and covered it up in order to protect his old friend despite their differences. Eventually, Rayna agrees to transfer her final life to Bonnie to save her, but she transfers her curse as well. In order to break it and save Bonnie, Damon is forced to enter the Vault of the Armory where the creature trapped within is able to enslave Damon and Enzo to its bidding.

==== Season 8 ====
In an attempt to save his brother, Stefan becomes the slave of Arcadius, murdering people for him and turning off his humanity again. Due to Arcadius' control over Hell, Stefan is rendered effectively immortal, being resurrected each time that he's killed. In this state, Stefan murders Enzo, but Bonnie finally stops him by injecting Stefan with the Cure that she has extracted from Elena's slumbering body, breaking Arcadius' control over Stefan and making him human once again. Stefan is forced to adjust to being human and Bonnie's hatred of him as well as Arcadius' attempts to unleash Hell on Earth. In a final confrontation, Stefan kills Arcadius with a dagger made out of Arcadius' own bones and reaches a degree of peace with Bonnie.

During seasons 7 and 8, Stefan develops a growing relationship with Caroline which only grows after she and Alaric end their romantic relationship. The two become engaged and later marry. However, with Arcadius' death, Katherine Pierce returns as the new queen of Hell and seeks to destroy Mystic Falls and get her revenge for what the Salvatores and their friends had done to her. The gang comes up with a plan to destroy Hell by redirecting all of the Hellfire that Vicki Donovan is going to release back into Hell with Damon intending to sacrifice himself to ensure Katherine's final destruction. Unwilling to let Damon die, Stefan subdues his brother and injects him with the Cure, making Damon human again, before sacrificing himself to restrain Katherine, ensuring his former lover's final end as he dies.

After death, Stefan appears to Elena in a dream to say goodbye to her before Bonnie finally manages to wake up her friend. In the afterlife known as Peace, Stefan is reunited with Lexi Branson and, decades later, Damon after he perishes of natural causes following a long human life with Elena.

==== The Originals ====
In a crossover with The Originals, Stefan seeks out Klaus' help with Rayna Cruz during The Vampire Diaries season seven's "Moonlight on the Bayou." In The Originals season three's "A Streetcar Named Desire," which acts as a continuation for Stefan of "Moonlight on the Bayou," Stefan gets caught up in helping the Mikaelsons and Marcel Gerard stop the witch Davina Claire from performing a spell to sever the Original bloodlines. They manage to stop Elijah's bloodline from being severed, but Davina succeeds in severing Klaus'. As a result, Stefan, Damon, Caroline and all of the other vampires descended from Klaus are no longer tied to him, meaning that they are safe if he dies. In addition, Davina is able to use power generated by the spell to resurrect Kol Mikaelson who was killed by Jeremy and Elena years earlier during the hunt for the Cure. Stefan and Klaus part ways as friends with Stefan promising to do right by Caroline while Klaus promises to do right by Hayley and his daughter.
