= List of The Originals characters =

The cast of the show from left to right: Leah Pipes, Joseph Morgan, Phoebe Tonkin, Claire Holt, Charles Michael Davis, Daniel Gillies, Daniella Pineda and Danielle Campbell

The Originals is an American fantasy-drama television series picked up by The CW television network for their fall 2013 schedule. The series was picked up after a backdoor pilot for aired as an episode of The CW fantasy-drama The Vampire Diaries in April 2013. It is a spin-off of The Vampire Diaries, sharing similar themes and depictions of reality as its predecessor. The show revolves around three Mikaelson siblings, Klaus (Joseph Morgan), Elijah (Daniel Gillies), and Rebekah (Claire Holt], collectively known as "original vampires", or simply the "originals". The Originals is set in the city of New Orleans. It was created by Julie Plec.

== Main characters ==
The following is a list of series regulars who have appeared in one or more of the series' five seasons. The characters are listed in the order they were first credited in the series.

Key

= Main cast
= Recurring cast
= Guest/Special Guest cast

Character	Actor	Seasons				
Character	Actor	1	2	3	4	5
Klaus Mikaelson	Joseph Morgan	Main	Main	Main	Main	Main
Elijah Mikaelson	Daniel Gillies	Main	Main	Main	Main	Main
Rebekah Mikaelson	Claire Holt	Main (Note: In season 1, Holt is credited as a series regular from episodes 1 to 16. From episodes 17 to 21, she does not appear and is not credited. In episode 22, she is credited as "also starring".)	Recurring (Note: In all subsequent appearances, Holt is credited as a special guest star in a recurring capacity.)	Recurring	Recurring	Recurring
Hayley Marshall	Phoebe Tonkin	Main (Note: In season 5, Tonkin is credited as a series regular in episodes 1 and 6 and from episodes 11 to 13. From episodes 2 to 5 and episodes 7 to 10, she does not appear and is not credited.)	Main	Main	Main	Main
Marcel Gerard	Charles Michael Davis	Main	Main	Main	Main	Main
Sophie Deveraux	Daniella Pineda	Main (Note: In season 1, Pineda is credited as a series regular from episodes 1 to 13. From episodes 14 to 22, she does not appear and is not credited.)				
Camille O'Connell	Leah Pipes	Main (Note: Leah Pipes is credited as a series regular from 1x01 through 3x19. From 3x20 to 3x22, she does not appear and is not credited.)	Main	Main	Special Guest	Special Guest
Davina Claire	Danielle Campbell	Main (Note: Danielle Campbell is credited as a series regular from 1x01 through 3x21. In 3x22, she does not appear and is not credited.)	Main	Main	Recurring (Note: Danielle Campbell is credited as a special guest star in all her appearances.)	Special Guest
Vincent Griffith	Yusuf Gatewood	Guest	Main (Note: In season 2, Gatewood is credited as a series regular from episode 14 to 22. From episodes 1 to 13, he is credited as a guest star.)	Main	Main	Main
Freya Mikaelson	Riley Voelkel		Recurring	Main	Main	Main
Hope Mikaelson	Danielle Rose Russell (Note: In seasons 1–3, Hope is portrayed by uncredited infant actors. In season 4, Hope is portrayed by the recurring actress Summer Fontana. In season 5, Fontana reprises her role as young Hope as a guest star.)	Guest	Recurring	Recurring	Recurring	Main
Josh Rosza	Steven Krueger	Recurring	Recurring	Recurring	Recurring	Main (Note: In season 5, Krueger is credited as a series regular from episodes 1 to 10. From episodes 11 to 13, he does not appear and is not credited.)

=== Klaus Mikaelson ===
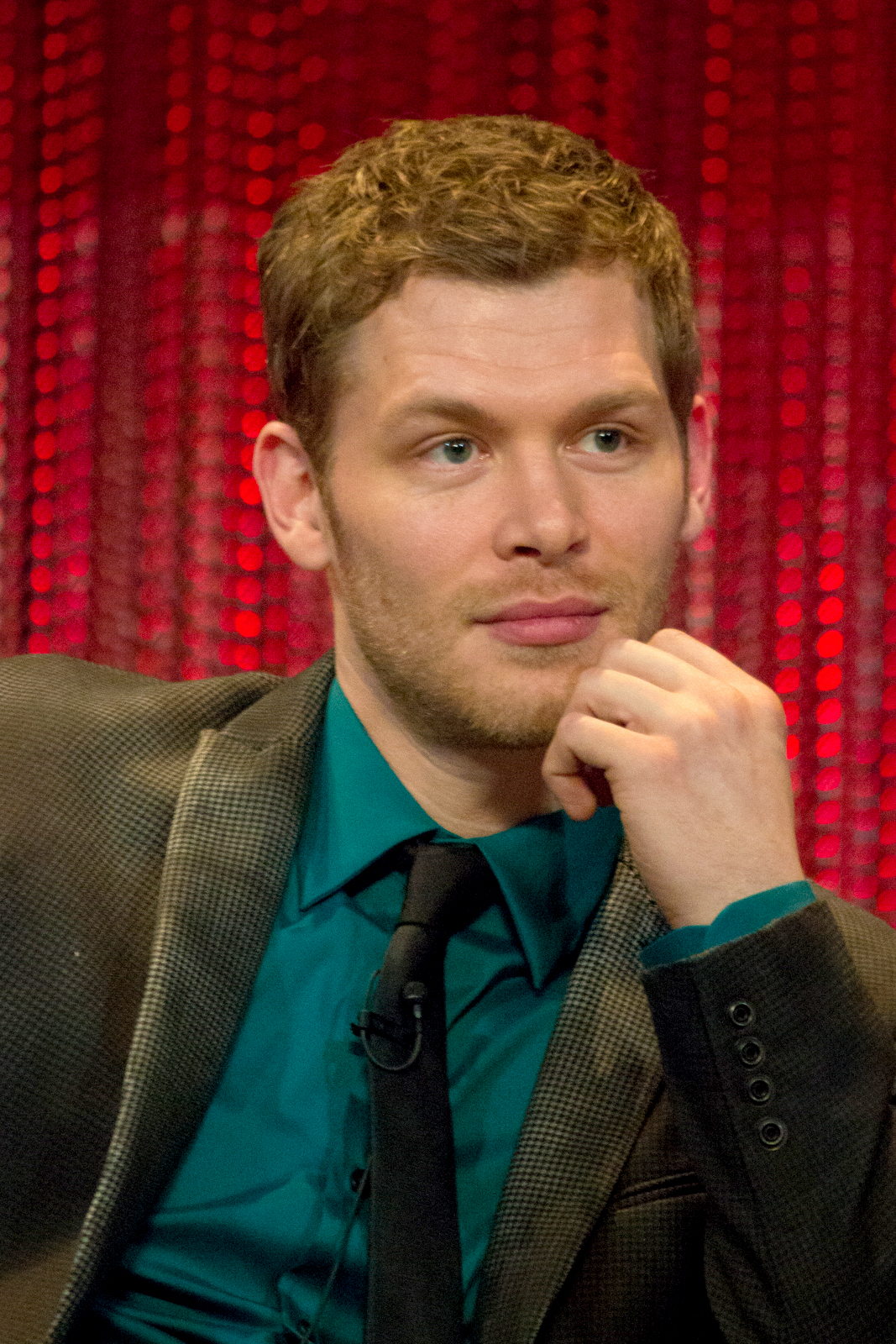
Joseph Morgan

- Played by Joseph Morgan
- TVD recurring season: 2
- TVD starring seasons: 3–4
- TO starring seasons: 1–5
- TVD special guest starring seasons: 5, 7
- LG special guest starring season: 4
- Also played by Aiden Flowers (young Niklaus) into seasons 1–2, 4

Niklaus Mikaelson (based on Klaus from "The Vampire Diaries" novels), more commonly known as Klaus, is an Original vampire, later known to be the Original Hybrid (half werewolf-half vampire).

=== Elijah Mikaelson ===
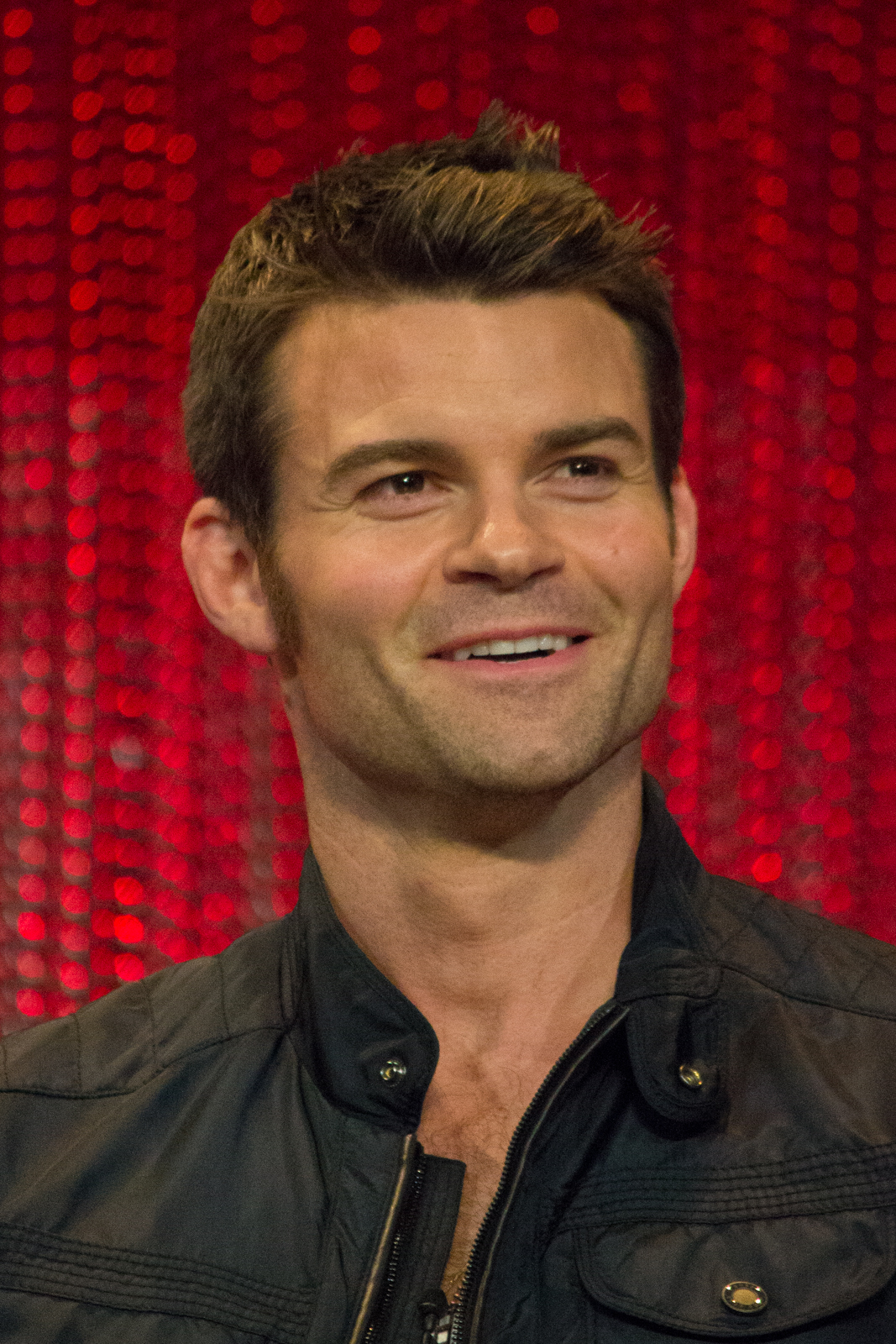
Daniel Gillies

- Played by Daniel Gillies
- TVD recurring seasons: 2–4
- TVD special guest starring season: 5
- TO starring seasons: 1–5
- Also played by Perry Cox (young Elijah) in seasons 1–2

Elijah Mikaelson is the second-oldest of the Original vampire brothers (and the third-born child of Mikael and Esther).

==== In The Vampire Diaries ====
Elijah first appears in episode eight of season two, Rose. Elijah is brought into the circle by two vampires named Rose and Trevor. They make a deal to be allowed immunity from Elijah and the Originals if they hand over Elena Gilbert, the new Petrova doppelgänger. It is later revealed that Rose and Trevor were the vampires who failed to keep Katerina Petrova (Katherine Pierce) alive for Klaus to sacrifice in the ritual required to release his werewolf abilities. They were subsequently hunted by Klaus and Elijah for centuries. Elijah had feelings for Katerina in 1492 (perhaps due to her resemblance to Tatia, The second doppelganger, and the woman that nature-based the doppelgänger curse off of when she was used to bind the Hybrid Curse back in the 10th century) and tried to save her from Klaus; however, she did not trust Elijah and chose to flee. Later, he would punish her for her betrayal by compelling her to stay in a tomb until he said otherwise. Elena is rescued by the Salvatore brothers not long after Elijah kills Trevor, who had betrayed Elijah in the past by helping Katerina escape. The Salvatores attack Elijah and succeed in staking him; however, he comes back to life at the end of the episode because he is an Original vampire who cannot be killed by any wooden stake. Elijah then works with a witch to locate Elena. The witch is able to locate her, so he goes to Mystic Falls to confront her, where he ends up saving her from a group of vampires who also wanted to take Elena. It is revealed that those vampires wanted to hand her over to Klaus. When Elijah discovers this, he makes peace with Elena and her friends, because he wants to use Elena as bait to draw out Klaus and kill him. He thus makes a deal with Elena that if she helps him kill Klaus, he will leave her friends alone. However, he also intends for Elena to be sacrificed as once Klaus breaks the curse and starts transforming, he will be left vulnerable enough to be killed. During a series of events, Elijah is temporarily "killed" when Elena stabs him with the dagger that can kill an original. When Klaus comes to town, Elena un-daggers Elijah because she needs his help, and he then reveals to her his family's history and the fact that Klaus killed the rest of his siblings. Elijah thus at first tries to help Elena and her friends kill Klaus, but ends up saving him instead in the season two finale episode because Klaus promises to take Elijah to their family (which Elijah had assumed Klaus had hidden their "dead" bodies deep in the ocean) if Elijah spares him. In season three, however, it is revealed that Klaus double-crossed Elijah once again, and daggered him to keep him close to him, like the rest of his daggered siblings. Damon undaggers Elijah later to help him find a way to kill Klaus. When Elijah awakens, he undaggers the rest of his siblings who were located in coffins like his in the same room. They begin to plot their revenge against Klaus, however, before they can make their move, their thought-to-be-dead mother Esther reappears and convinces the siblings to be a family again, which later turns out to be a front for her true motives. After Elijah foils his mother's plans to kill him and his siblings, he leaves Mystic Falls a tortured soul, ashamed of his own barbaric actions and those of his family. He is shown to be one of the most sophisticated and peaceful of the Original siblings, alongside Finn. He is the most compromising regarding Elena and her friends. Elijah and Elena develop a sort of understanding during the series, and Elena comes to be fond of Elijah's company. She thus feels especially betrayed when earlier Elijah threatened to allow Rebekah to kill Elena if the Salvatore brothers are not able to stop Esther Mikaelson from killing the Original Family. However, in the 18th episode of season three, Elena professes that she hopes that her vampire friends are descended from Elijah's bloodline so that he can be spared. Elijah returns to town in the season three finale episode, "The Departed", in order to make a deal with Elena and her friends. Elijah proposes that he be allowed to take Klaus's desiccated (by witch Bonnie and help from the Salvatores and Tyler) body with him and his siblings and leave town, and in exchange, he would make sure that Klaus would not be resurrected within Elena's lifetime or even that of her children, stating: "Perhaps that will teach him some manners." However, Klaus is staked, and Elijah and Rebekah believe him to be dead, even though Klaus actually possessed Tyler Lockwood's body and lives on.

==== In The Originals ====
Elijah follows his brother, Klaus, to New Orleans and is determined to keep his vow that they are family forever and always, a sentiment Klaus occasionally resents, but has come to rely on.

Elijah meets Hayley, a werewolf carrying Klaus's unborn child, and feels an instant elation of hope that this child will be the salvation of Klaus and a means to draw their broken family back together again, and gives his word that Hayley and the child are family and under his protection. Elijah seeks to reestablish the family's home in New Orleans, as this was the time of their greatest happiness and concord.

Unfortunately, Elijah is also immediately drawn to Hayley herself. Hayley returns his interest, but Elijah tries to subdue his attraction out of respect for Klaus.

Elijah spends most of his efforts attempting to control Klaus and keep all of his bickering family members in line. Klaus and Elijah have something of a symbiotic relationship: Elijah offers the unconditional love Klaus craves, while Klaus represents the possibility that, if Klaus can be saved, so can Elijah, while offering a fertile ground for Elijah's caretaker tendencies.

Elijah is often criticized for always siding with Klaus, and frequently suffers consequences for doing so. Despite his oath to stand fast with Klaus, Elijah often assumes the worst of his brother and is quick to cause Klaus to suffer, especially physically, if it means sparing others (usually their sister, Rebekah, or Hayley).

While he is considered the "honorable" one, who always keeps his word and behaves with impeccable decorum in the formal suits he only wears, Elijah is just as brutal as his brother. He also tends to be domineering, controlling, and smothering to those he considers under his care, and sometimes becomes frustrated and annoyed with Klaus for keeping Elijah from what Elijah wants. Elijah must learn to loosen his rigid control, trust his family more, and be selfish every once in a while, in order to find healthier happiness.

Elijah eventually finds himself as the de facto king of the city, since Klaus does not like to trouble himself with the minutia of everyday rule, and must attempt to broker peace between all of the warring factions or, pending failure, destroy them all in order to make the city safe for his family and new niece.

In season four, Elijah is killed by a fictional ancient evil known as the Hollow as part of its resurrection plan, ending his bloodline. Elijah's family manages to resurrect him, but those descended from Elijah remain dead.

In the series finale, Klaus reveals that, after taking in the Hollow, he intends to commit suicide using a white oak stake he has kept in secret for decades to end the Hollow's threat and ensure the safety of his loved ones. Elijah convinces his brother to say a proper goodbye and then reveals that he intends to die with Klaus whom he feels has been fully redeemed so that they can go on to whatever comes next together. Klaus and Elijah stake each other and die together, taking with them the Hollow.

==== In Legacies ====
In the series finale, it is revealed that Klaus has found Peace, meaning that Elijah presumably has as well.

=== Rebekah Mikaelson ===
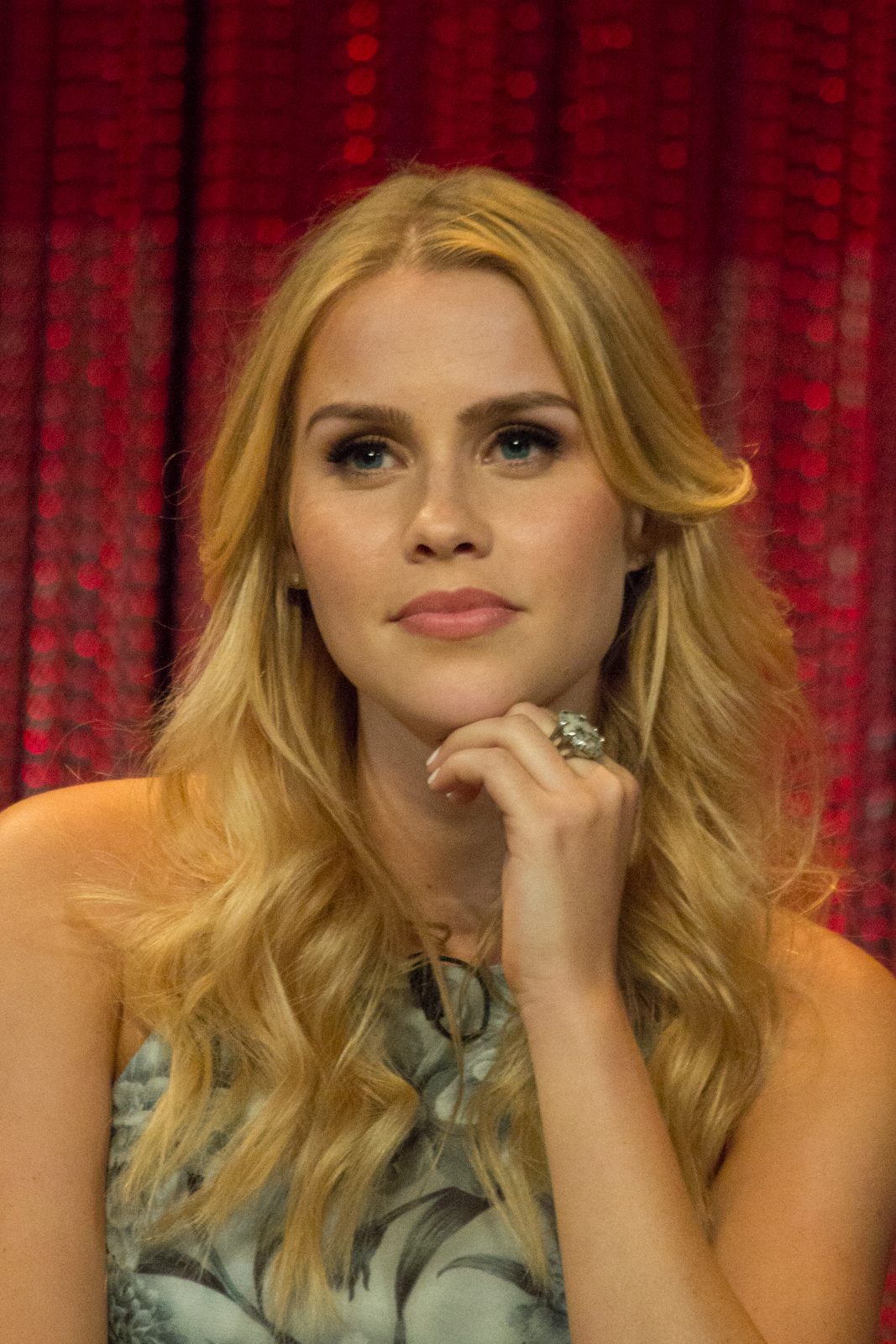
Claire Holt

- Played by Claire Holt
- TVD recurring seasons: 3–5
- TO starring season: 1
- TO special guest starring seasons: 2–5
- Legacies special guest starring season: 4
- Also played by Callie McClincy (young Rebekah) in seasons 1–2

Rebekah Mikaelson is a fictional character; she is Klaus and Elijah's younger sister as well as being an Original vampire. Rebekah shares a deep bond with her brothers Klaus and Elijah; she was the only family member that remained loyal to Klaus despite his vicious behavior toward his family. Klaus kept her by his side for the most part, while he kept the rest of his family staked and stored away in coffins for hundreds of years at a time.

==== In The Vampire Diaries ====
Rebekah developed a romantic interest in Stefan Salvatore during their encounters in the early 1920s. However, when Klaus and Rebekah were again forced to go on the run by the arrival of their vengeful father Mikael, Rebekah professed an interest in staying in one place and living a stable life with Stefan by her side. Klaus subsequently forced her to choose between a life with him and one with Stefan. When she chooses the latter. Klaus daggers her and stores her body in her coffin for the decades preceding the re-entry of Stefan into their lives. .

He brings her back to life during the period in which the show takes place in order to obtain her necklace (which was originally Esther's). The same necklace had been given to Elena by Stefan in season one. Rebekah and Klaus thus head to Mystic Falls. Rebekah develops a deep jealousy toward and envy of Elena, and continually tries to hurt, emotionally distress, and even kill her until her brother Klaus forces her to stop. Later on, Rebekah is once again daggered, this time by Elena, to simplify the Salvatores' plans to kill Klaus. Elena makes a deal with Klaus; she will reveal Rebekah's location as long as Klaus promises not to harm Jeremy. Klaus takes her body with him, along with the others. She is eventually un-daggered by Elijah. During her time in Mystic Falls Rebekah enrolls in the local high school, much to the disgust of Elena and her friends. There, she at first makes romantic advances toward Tyler Lockwood, Caroline Forbes's boyfriend. She later develops a fondness for Matt Donovan and invites him to her family's ball that is thrown by Esther, who had been accidentally revived by Bonnie. Rebekah is lonely and insecure, even though she tries to hide this by being violent and cruel. This is demonstrated quite well through her sexual rendezvous with Damon Salvatore, an enemy of her family, and the subsequent torture she forces him to endure after being betrayed by him. Rebekah's body is temporarily taken over by her witch mother, Esther, through a spell performed by Esther. She invades Rebekah's body in order to be able to go unnoticed while scheming to kill all of her Original children. Esther later leaves Rebekah's body and daggers her. However, Klaus restores Rebekah to full vitality by removing the stake. In the season three finale, while Matt is driving Elena back to Mystic Falls, after trying to escape with her, Rebekah is seen standing in the middle of Wickery Bridge. Matt sees her, loses control, and drives the car into the lake, which ultimately results in Elena's death and subsequent transformation into a vampire.

In the season four premiere of The Vampire Diaries, Rebekah is captured alongside every other vampire in Mystic Falls. While en route to their detainment, Caroline is rescued by Klaus, inhabiting Tyler's body, but he leaves his sister in the wrecked truck. While locked up, Rebekah realizes that Elena is in transition but hasn't fed on human blood, which she is delighted about because "I get to watch you die all over again." However, as she sits in her cell, she listens to Elena and Stefan's heartfelt confessions of regret and love to each other with a conflicted look on her face. Rebekah then helps Stefan kill one of their guards, allowing Elena to feed on his blood and complete the transition into a vampire. After being released, Rebekah storms home and confronts Klaus, now back in his original body. Rebekah, in tears and furious, tells him how she always loved him despite everything he has done but he doesn't love or care for her as a sister. Rebekah then destroys the last few bags of Elena's blood, preventing him from creating more hybrids. In retaliation, Klaus disowns Rebekah, telling her he does not love her and that she is not his sister anymore, and breaks her neck. Rebekah leaves Klaus' mansion and moves into her own house. She befriends April Young, an orphan who moves back to Mystic Falls after her father is killed in an explosion. She is then asked by Stefan to tell him and Klaus the story of the Five and the cure for vampirism. After Klaus and Stefan find out what they need from her, Klaus daggers Rebekah and has Stefan hide her.

Later, April learns from Caroline where Rebekah is and un-daggers her. With April's help, Rebekah takes Elena, Stefan, and Caroline prisoner so that she can learn what progress they have made in finding the cure. After toying with them and finding out what she wants, she releases them. Stefan later approaches her, and she states she still wishes to find the cure so she can use it on Klaus. Stefan then proposes the two work together to get the cure since they are the only two without an edge since Klaus has the sword, Damon is with Jeremy, and Bonnie is working with Professor Shane. In A View to Kill, Rebekah and Stefan work together to find the headstone of the first immortal creature. She then convinces him to stop caring about Elena and the two have sex.

Throughout season four, Rebekah is shown to be interested in Matt Donovan, but he is not interested in her. Near the end of the season, the four spend more time together and appear to be friends. Whilst Rebekah is on a test to see if she could be human Matt tells her that she would not be a good human because she is not a good person. Later on, Rebekah saves April's life, changing Matt's view of her. In the season four finale, Rebekah and Matt kiss while Matt is being held hostage and Rebekah saves his life, taking his place and allowing him to leave in order to attend graduation. Matt then develops some feelings for Rebekah and agrees to spend the summer traveling the world with her, saying that whatever happens on the road stays on the road. About three months after she returns from touring the world with Matt, she returns to Mystic Falls in order to help Matt when he is buried alive by Nadia.

==== In The Originals ====
During the first season of The Originals, Rebekah returns to New Orleans in order to find and assist her brother, Elijah, who had come after their troubled brother, Klaus.

Rebekah is reluctantly roped into staying and playing happy families by Elijah, who wants the siblings to repair their relationships and welcome their newest member: Klaus's child. Rebekah eventually grows fond of Hayley, the child's mother, but Rebekah's increasingly contentious and sniping relationship with Klaus begins to crescendo.

Rebekah's main source of contention with her brother Klaus is his overbearing and controlling tendencies getting in the way of Rebekah's fondest desires: namely to start a family of her own with someone who loves her absolutely and be 'free'. Unfortunately, Klaus has a very low opinion of Rebekah's taste in men and has consistently killed every man Rebekah has ever fallen in love with and daggered Rebekah into a forced sleep for decades as punishment for trying to leave Klaus. Rebekah has, therefore, come to fear, hate, and resent Klaus, even as she tries to honor Elijah's wish that they become a complete family once again.

Klaus's opinion of Rebekah's ability to choose a partner worthy of her turns out to be generally accurate, and she is drawn to Marcel, Klaus's ward. As a test, Klaus daggers Rebekah into sleep and offers Marcel a deal. Marcel does not choose Rebekah, and she is left asleep for half a century. Despite this, the two rekindle their relationship in secret several times, with Rebekah harboring the hope that the two of them will flee her brothers' control and live happily elsewhere since she has little hope of Klaus giving his approval.

Rebekah is therefore very conflicted to find that Marcel, whom she believed to be dead for nearly a century, has been alive and thriving as King of New Orleans, and has new women in his life whom he loves. Rebekah is hurt Marcel never bothered trying to find her and chose power over her love.

Trapped in the cycle of an on-again-off-again relationship with Marcel, Rebekah grows increasingly bitter about the control the men in her life (Marcel and her two brothers) have over her. She attempts to gain some freedom and revenge by fomenting plots of her own with a skill that rivals her brothers' but tends to fail when her desire to be loved undermines her desire to escape her family, and the men in her life show their willingness to go to worse depths than she.

Ultimately, Rebekah falls from her place as the perfect and innocent sister when her past betrayal of Klaus at the prompting of her resentment and Marcel's encouragement is revealed. When Klaus proves her fears and expectations wrong; Marcel chooses something else over her yet again; Elijah lets her go, and Rebekah is accepted as a flawed individual, Rebekah realizes she can leave and be as free as she likes, which she does with happiness.

At the end of season one, Rebekah returns to New Orleans. Klaus, with no other options, gives Rebekah his new daughter, baby Hope. He tells her the only person he trusts to keep her safe is her. She leaves town with baby Hope.

Rebekah appears in the opening scene of season two, where we see her telling Hope a story while taking care of her.

Later in season two, Rebekah is back with Hope, afraid her mother has found them. She talks to Elijah and notices something is wrong with him and proceeds to find out he killed a diner full of people for no good reason (as a result of their mother forcing memories and nightmares upon him in an attempt to get him to agree to become mortal) so she snaps his neck in order to protect Hope from him, she then takes both Hope and Elijah to a new location where she reunites with Hayley and Klaus and the five of them take part in their Bonfire tradition. To protect Hope, she volunteers to lure their mother by faking to accept her deal. She comes to see Esther, talks to her, and shares wine as they agree on the spell. As the ceremony begins, she notices the white oak stake that shouldn't be there and wants to call the spell off as their mother lies to them. She still suffers the spell and doesn't wake up in her body, but before the spell, she managed to drop some of her blood into her mother's wine glass making her mother a vampire when Klaus killed her. She is now trapped in a witch's body, locked in a mansion because of Kol's revenge on her (when she betrayed him back in 1914). She is later freed and takes part in the effort to defeat Davina. She later departs, still in the witch's body, in search of a way to properly resurrect Kol.

In season three, Rebekah's efforts to find a way to resurrect her brother ends when a vampire named Aya kills her witch body, sending Rebekah back into her vampire body. At the same time, New Orleans sees the arrival of Lucien Castle as well as Tristan and Aurora de Martel, the very first vampires ever created by Klaus, Elijah and Rebekah respectively. Alongside the Strix, an ancient vampire order created by Elijah, the three seek to sever the vampire sirelines and kill the Originals. Although the de Martels are defeated, Davina Claire succeeds in severing Klaus' sireline before resurrecting Kol and, inadvertently, Finn. However, the reunion of the Originals is interrupted by Lucien's transformation into the Beast, an unstoppable vampire with enhanced abilities created using seven different kinds of werewolf venom, the spell that Esther used to transform her children into vampires and the last piece of White Oak. Lucien kills Finn and goes on a rampage before his new powers are stripped away by Freya and he's finally killed by Klaus. However, Marcel gets the last dose of Lucien's serum and transforms himself into the Beast as well and moves against the Originals, fatally poisoning Elijah and Kol with his venom, giving Rebekah a fatal hex and poisoning Freya who places the siblings into suspended animation tied to Klaus' life. As Marcel takes Klaus prisoner, Hayley takes the other Mikaelsons and goes into hiding until she can find a way to save them.

In season four, five years later, Hayley has managed to find a cure for Freya and a witch to siphon off Rebekah's hex, possibly Valerie Tulie, the last known Siphoner aside from Josie and Lizzie Saltzman. With the ingredients that Hayley managed to gather for her, Freya saves her siblings who free Klaus. Marcel banishes the Mikaelsons from New Orleans and Rebekah and Kol depart to find a new life. However, an ancient evil soon emerges in New Orleans, a spirit called the Hollow who kills Elijah. Witnessing the deaths of several vampires of Elijah's sireline, Rebekah and Kol return to New Orleans to help stop the Hollow. In order to defeat it, Klaus, Rebekah, Kol and a resurrected Elijah each take a piece of the Hollow's soul into themselves and go their separate ways for all time. Rebekah renews her relationship with Marcel, and they leave New Orleans together.

In season five, seven years later, Rebekah remains in a relationship with Marcel, but she gets cold feet and leaves him when Marcel proposes to her. The threat of vampire extremists draws the Mikaelsons back to New Orleans and Hope draws the Hollow out of them and into herself, renewing its threat. Ultimately, Klaus decides to draw the Hollow into himself and sacrifice himself to destroy it for good.

In the series finale, Rebekah finally accepts Marcel's marriage proposal and leaves New Orleans with him. Before his death, Klaus arranges for Rebekah to receive the Cure in several decades, presumably when Damon Salvatore dies, so that she can finally live the human life that Rebekah has always wanted. With the death of Klaus and Elijah's decision to die alongside his brother, Rebekah and Kol are left as the only surviving Original Vampires.

==== In Legacies ====
Rebekah appears to Hope, after her transition, in a bar just as Hope was about to feed off some woman. Rebekah and Hope have drinks together and Rebekah figures out Hope has flipped off her humanity switch. Outside the bar after attempting to bring it on with telling Hope the beauty about being a vampire daggers Hope. Rebekah has her neck snapped whilst putting Hope in the car. She awakens by the side of the road and after another attempt to bring Hope's humanity on Hope leaves her with her crescent and Mikaelson necklace and Rebekah watches Hope drive off.

Rebekah joins Kol, Freya and her husband Marcel in successfully bringing Hope's humanity back whilst putting Klaus to rest deciding Hope should be the one to decide where to spread Klaus' ashes.

=== Hayley Marshall ===
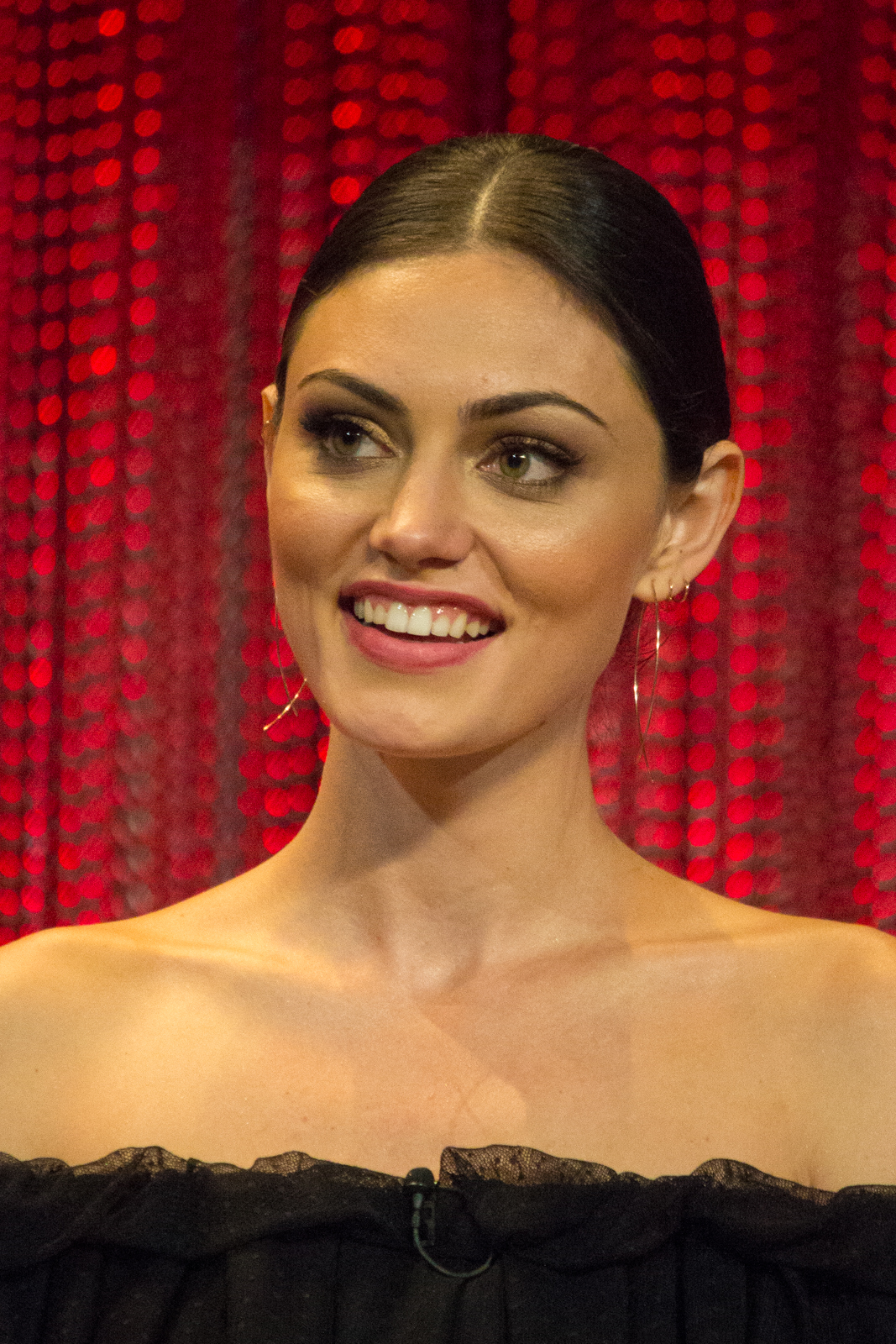
Phoebe Tonkin

- Played by Phoebe Tonkin
- TVD recurring season: 4
- TO starring seasons: 1–5

Hayley Marshall (born Andréa Labonair) is a fictional character who is a crescent werewolf.

==== In The Vampire Diaries ====
Hayley sets off to find Tyler when she hears from one of Klaus's hybrids, who was from a pack she used to run with, talking about protecting him. She surprises Tyler when she shows up at his house unannounced, something Tyler is clearly happy about. While they talk, Hayley mentions helping Tyler break his sire bond. She chastises him for lying about his real identity; apparently, he had told her he lived in a trailer park in Florida. Hayley seems annoyed by this but quickly forgives him. When Caroline shows up and Tyler leaves the room to talk to her, Hayley meets Klaus who appears to talk to her. Klaus overhears Tyler and Caroline's conversation, and Tyler makes an excuse about staying home, not mentioning Hayley. Klaus assumes that Tyler and Hayley had a fling, which Hayley does not deny. When Tyler comes back, he finds Hayley has gone and Klaus tells him she left. Klaus then speculates that Tyler and Hayley may have hooked up, although that hasn't been confirmed. Tyler only lets Klaus believe something happened between them to distract him from Tyler's plan to break the sire bonds of the other hybrids. Hayley eavesdrops on a conversation between Tyler and Dean when Caroline shows up and meets Hayley. Hayley tells Caroline she's been staying with Tyler since she needs a place to stay, and that they're good friends. Caroline is clearly irritated that a strange girl is staying at her boyfriend's house when she knew nothing about it, but Hayley doesn't seem bothered by Caroline's irritation. Hayley excuses herself to join Tyler and Dean's argument about whether Dean should obey Klaus's order to deal with Connor or not. After Dean's death, Tyler comforts Hayley, which again irritates Caroline. Tyler later explains that he and Hayley plan to help all of Klaus's hybrids break the sire bond. Tyler finds Hayley, Chris, and some other hybrids drinking in honor of Dean. Hayley keeps up the ruse that there is something romantic going on between her and Tyler by sensually wiping alcohol from Tyler's lip, knowing Klaus is witnessing it. Soon after, Caroline arrives and stages a breakup with Tyler in front of Klaus, after which he leaves with the hybrids. Once Klaus is gone, Hayley, Tyler, and Caroline smile at one another, and Caroline thanks Hayley for telling her that Klaus was there. Hayley watches Tyler and Caroline kiss, smiling slightly.

Later, Tyler tells Stefan about Hayley and that she helped him, and Chris break their sire bonds, also revealing that they plan on unsiring all the hybrids from Klaus. That night, when Chris is about to leave Tyler's house, Klaus appears and berates Chris for failing to keep Elena secured. Tyler tries to cover for him, but Hayley intervenes to claim that she let Elena out and stands up to Klaus, daring him to kill her instead. Klaus apparently lets Chris go, but when Jeremy and Stefan arrive Klaus allows Jeremy to chop off Chris's head while Hayley and Tyler watch in horror. After Chris's death, Hayley is passed out the next morning next to Tyler on a sofa; they had clearly spent the entire night drinking in honor of Chris. After Caroline and Tyler argue she is abruptly awakened when Tyler throws a glass bottle, and it explodes against the wall. Hayley is in an abandoned barn helping Kimberley break her sire bond when Tyler arrives, saying Caroline got them another day by agreeing to go with Klaus to the Miss Mystic Falls Pageant. Hayley suggests that they go to keep up the ruse that she is the reason Caroline and Tyler broke up, and Tyler reluctantly agrees. Caroline and Klaus see Hayley and Tyler arrive, which seems to upset Caroline. Hayley mocks the pageant by donning the tiara intended for the winner. Later, Damon and Tyler see Hayley talking to Shane, and Damon wonders aloud how he knows her. Tyler assures him she doesn't, but Damon's suspicion seems to plant doubt in Tyler's mind. Later, when Tyler is sitting with Hayley, she asks if he got the wolf gene from his mother, claiming his mother knows how to party as she is seen drinking a lot and doesn't appear too drunk. He tells her he got the gene from his dad and asks her about her parents. She tells him she never knew her real parents and that she triggered the gene by accidentally killing someone in a boating accident while she was drunk. Tyler subtly asks if she knows Shane, but she claims she doesn't.

Later that night, after Tyler calls Hayley to tell her that Kimberley broke the sire bond, Hayley is in Shane's office and tells him they freed another one. She emphasizes that she doesn't want Tyler to have anything to do with whatever they are planning. When Hayley is helping Adrian break the sire bond, Kimberley interferes and frees him before they finish. Later, she breaks into Shane's office, and when he arrives, she reveals that her deal with Shane was to get him twelve hybrids, unsired from Klaus, in exchange for information about her parents. Shane threatens to include Tyler in the twelve if she doesn't manage to break Adrian's sire bond, so Hayley encourages Tyler to take the role of alpha and give Adrian orders to go through with it. He follows her advice, but Kimberley retaliates by kidnapping and torturing Caroline. Later, after Tyler has forced the hybrids to submit to him and Adrian has finally broken his sire bond, Hayley reports to Shane that they have their twelve hybrids. In return, Shane gives her a flash drive with information about her parents, informing her that they are dead but reassuring her that she can see them again. He cryptically tells her that it's far from over and that they are just the beginning. During the Winter Wonderland charity event, Tyler tells Caroline that Hayley has found a powerful witch who can use a spell to transport Klaus into someone else's body. When he reveals that he has volunteered to house Klaus's essence and be buried in concrete, Caroline, after much tension with Tyler and the hybrids, eventually has the idea that they should use Rebekah's body instead. Worried about changing the plan, Hayley texts Shane about having problems, but he merely tells her to fix them. Hayley then snaps Caroline's neck and tells Klaus about Tyler's plan. While Klaus is killing Tyler's pack, Hayley explains to Tyler that she made a deal with someone who can help her find her real family and that her end of the bargain was to provide twelve unsired hybrids for the sacrifice. She warns Tyler that he should leave town to escape Klaus's wrath. She then flees herself. Hayley's whereabouts were unknown until Vaughn – a hunter – reveals to Damon and Rebekah that Katherine got her information about Silas from Hayley when they crossed paths in New Orleans.

In Bring It On, Hayley is attacked by a vampire named Will who was sent by Katherine to kill her. Klaus appears and saves her, in the process biting and poisoning the vampire with his werewolf venom. Klaus then takes Hayley to his mansion, where he plays the hospitable host in order to glean information about Katherine. He politely interrogates Hayley, though she claims she does not know where Katherine is. She tells Klaus that Katherine found her in New Orleans when she was trying to find her real parents and Katherine told Hayley she could help her. Klaus claims that he is the only one who can protect Hayley from Katherine's minions, and says that he will as long as she cooperates with him. Hayley goes into the next room and looks at Klaus's paintings, expressing distaste for all but one, which she describes as twisted. She asks Klaus why he paints and in response, he describes the painting as a metaphor for control. Hayley calls him out on his attempts to soften her up before mentioning Klaus's plans to kill Tyler. Klaus assures her that the better punishment is sentencing Tyler to a lifetime of paranoia and fear. Hayley then reveals to Klaus that the reason he has been unable to find Katherine all these centuries has been her ability to build and maintain a network of allies willing to do anything for her. Klaus asks Hayley if she knows any of Katherine's allies, and she responds teasingly that she might know a couple and she might even tell him about them. Later, after Damon has killed Will, Klaus offers to let Hayley stay anyway. She suggests a deal: her intel in exchange for Tyler's freedom, but Klaus cannot bring himself to make any promises when it comes to Tyler. Hayley draws him back in by returning to what he said about his paintings and control and tacitly offers him control with her. He takes the bait, and they have sex. Afterward, while Hayley is dressing, Klaus notices a mark on Hayley's back that, according to him, is only found on those of a certain bloodline of werewolves originating in Louisiana.

==== In The Originals ====
Hayley returns in The Originals where in Mystic Falls, Katherine tells Stefan and Damon that Hayley was what they needed to rid Klaus from their lives for good. In New Orleans, Hayley is told by a witch named Jane-Anne that in the bayou the wolves were named "Roux-Ga-Roux". Jane-Anne shows her an area on a map saying it'll give her what she is looking for. Hayley heads towards the area while Jane-Anne and Sophie prepare to do a spell on her. While Jane-Anne does the spell, Hayley's car breaks down and when seeing other people come to her, she passes out with Sophie and the other witches of the Quarter circling her. Later it is revealed by Elijah and Sophie, that she is pregnant with Klaus's child.

During the first season of The Originals, Hayley had trouble coping with her pregnancy and initially tried to abort this baby but eventually came around to it. She also has feelings for Elijah, who also has the same feelings. Her story arc mainly involves her helping some Werewolves at a Bayou after Marcel got a witch to put a curse on them that would keep them in their wolf form unless it was a full moon, but this curse later got broken after Celeste used a spell to break it. Hayley is also trying to track down the real identities of her birth parents, who are revealed to have been the alphas (royal family) of the Bayou werewolves, known as the Crescent Packs, before their deaths making little Hayley the Princess of the Crescent Packs and next-in-line to lead the pack. Hayley also meets Jackson Kenner, another alpha werewolf whom her parents had betrothed her to when she was a baby hoping them to be the future King and Queen of the Crescent Packs. Throughout the first season, Hayley develops strong friendships with Rebekah Mikaelson and even Klaus somewhat and starts developing romantic feelings for Elijah Mikaelson, which he reciprocates.

She is killed by a witch named Monique in the finale "From a Cradle to a Grave" after giving birth to her daughter, Hope; she later awakens in transition to a hybrid because the blood of her hybrid daughter remained within her system. She went to the graveyard to help Klaus and Elijah find Genevieve and her baby. She later stabs and kills Genevieve as revenge for trying to kill her daughter. Afterward, she, Klaus, and Elijah agree that the best way to protect Hope is to send her away while they "clean up the mess that [they've] made". Hayley uses her grief over giving her daughter to Rebekah as a ruse to convince everyone in New Orleans that her daughter was killed.

In the second season, Hayley is struggling to adapt to her new hybrid status, feeling grieved over not having her daughter, enraged at the witches who tried to kill her baby, and disgusted at having to live like a vampire and drink blood. Hayley and Elijah have also grown distant, as she believes he sees her the way she sees herself, as a monster, and becomes closer to Klaus when he helps her reconnect with her werewolf side. Hayley later learns that, if she marries Jackson in a mystical werewolf ritual, the entire Crescent pack will gain her hybrid ability to transform at will, thus ending their allegiance to the witches and giving protection to Hope, which would allow her to come back home to her parents. Hayley ultimately decides to go through with the wedding, even if it means ending any chance of a romantic future with Elijah. At this point, Hayley and Jackson call on the alpha werewolves of several neighboring packs to sign away their alpha statuses to Hayley and Jackson and accept them as their new alphas. This would mean the respective werewolves of each ex-alpha's pack would become part of the Crescent pack under Hayley and Jackson's leadership and all these werewolves would be able to enjoy Hayley's gifts following the marriage ritual. Hayley begins developing feelings for Jackson, creating a sort of family with him, Hope, and the pack, which is now bigger and more powerful than ever. However, when the Mikaelsons' aunt Dahlia threatens to take Hope away from them as part of a pact she made with her sister Esther (Klaus and Elijah's mother), Hayley decides to flee with Jackson and Hope, earning Klaus's enmity. He curses her to be a wolf every night except that of the full moon for six months, as punishment for attempting to take their daughter away from him.

In season three, Hayley's curse is broken by Davina so that she can kill a witch who was angered by Davina's status as regent. After a violent fight with Klaus, Hayley was eventually reunited with Hope and is able to stay in an apartment across the street with her and Jackson. Her constant desire to help the Mikaelsons, and Elijah in particular, causes a rift between her and Jackson, who feels that Hayley is choosing them over him. They manage to reconcile at Christmas when Jackson accepts that the Mikaelsons are her family as much as he and Hope are. Unfortunately, Tristan de Martel and his Strix vampires attack and abduct Jackson and Hayley in the Bayou the next day, as leverage against the Mikaelsons. Tristan, in revenge for Hayley helping Elijah torture him earlier in the season, rips Jackson's heart out in front of Hayley, seconds after he had proclaimed his unending love for her. This loss deeply grieves Hayley, who spends the next few weeks in a deep depression as she copes with her husband's death. Eventually, Hayley is able to regain some semblance of her former self, proving instrumental in saving Klaus and Elijah from the Strix and the de Martel siblings (though not before Klaus's sireline was broken). Hayley additionally begins taking her grief over Jackson's death out on the members of the Strix who played a hand in his death, starting with Aya. Eventually, the killings garner the attention of the remaining Strix, and Elijah is forced to intervene, killing the rest of Hayley's potential victims in order to throw others off her trail. Hayley then confesses to him that she has always loved him, yet due to guilt over Jackson's death, she decides to leave New Orleans with Klaus and Hope, in an attempt to get over her feelings for Elijah. Eventually, she returns and helps defeat Lucien and Aurora as they attempt to kill the Mikaelsons, though her friends Camille and Davina also perish. Hayley eventually begins a relationship with Elijah towards the end of the season, which is later disrupted by Marcel's quest for revenge over Davina's death. Hayley is the only member of the family left standing, with Elijah, Kol, Freya, and Rebekah under a sleeping spell with Klaus held hostage by Marcel as the anchor. She and Hope both leave New Orleans in an attempt to grow up away from the drama and find a cure for the family, only to return five years later.

Due to the way in which Hayley became a hybrid, she is not linked to any of the Originals. As such, if the Originals were to be destroyed, hence wiping out all vampires, Hayley would be the only vampire left on Earth. It is unknown what would happen to any vampires she sires if she is destroyed, though, given the nature of her transformation, it is possible that they would survive. It is also unknown if Hayley is linked to her daughter, Hope, in the same way, that vampires were linked to the Original that founded the line.

In season 5, Hayley begins with just her and her daughter Hope as the end of season 5 the family had to split up due to, if they were to all be in the same room as Hope, Hope would get the Hollow's magic again and it will kill her. Klaus gets led back to New Orleans as Hayley has gone missing; later it has been confirmed that Hope is the cause of the disappearance but she did it so she could see her father.

Hayley's body is not where Hope had placed her and her friends and family set out to find her, although she is not found until episode 6. It was shown that she had been tortured for being a hybrid, a witch performs magic which makes Hayley no longer a hybrid but only a vampire. Hayley's death was painful, she had ripped Greta's finger off (which had the daylight ring on) and grabbed her before running into the sun and both burning to death.

Hayley is seen again when Hope goes unconscious later on and it is seen that Hayley is at peace with her parents, other family members, and Jackson. In the series finale, Hayley can be seen watching over her daughter as Klaus sacrifices himself to destroy the Hollow for good.

=== Marcel Gerard ===
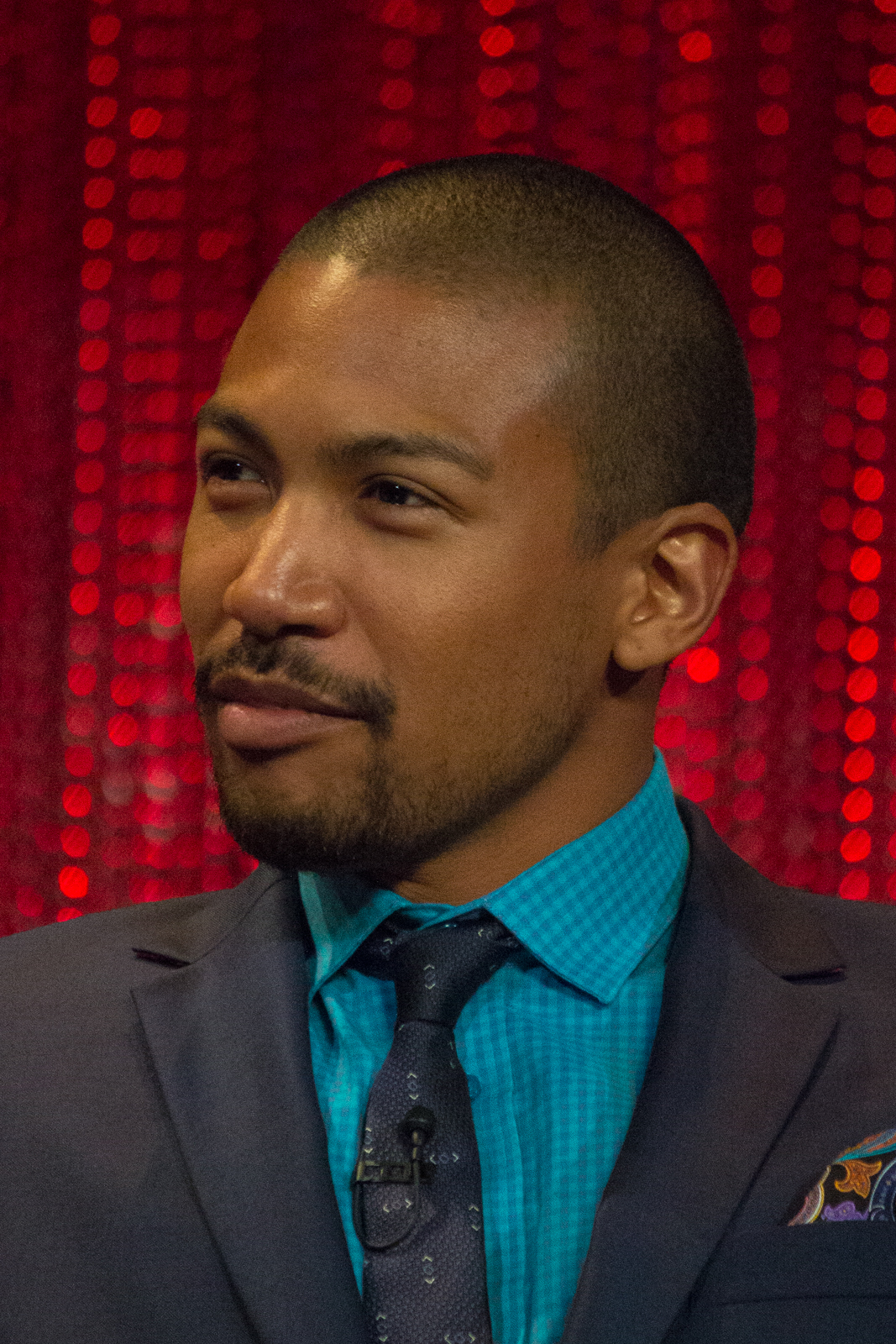
Charles Michael Davis

- Played by Charles Michael Davis
- TVD guest starring season: 4
- TO starring seasons: 1–5
- Legacies special guest star season 4
- Also played by McCarrie McCausland (young Marcel) in seasons 1–2

Marcellus "Marcel" Gerard is Klaus' former protégé and a vampire that he turned in the early 1800s.

==== In The Vampire Diaries ====
Marcel Gerard is a fictional character who appears in the backdoor pilot of The Originals.

==== In The Originals ====
Marcel was born a slave and the bastard son of a plantation owner during the 1800s. Klaus rescued Marcel as a boy, saving him from a whipping and essentially raising Marcel as a welcome and loved part of the Mikaelson family. Marcel's feelings towards the Originals are complex. As a child, Marcel was grateful for their intercession, had slight heroic worship for Klaus, and swore he would grow up to marry Rebekah. As an adult, Marcel resents being made to feel like a secondary member of the family, and that their abilities will always be greater as Originals. Growing up in such an unusual environment was also traumatizing for young Marcel, who witnessed many acts of arbitrary violence.

Klaus refused to turn Marcel, believing it would ruin Marcel's innocence and turn him into a monster, and further objects to a romantic relationship between Rebekah and Marcel, offering Marcel the following deal: live with Rebekah for the remainder of Marcel's mortal life with Klaus's blessing, or be turned and give Rebekah up. Marcel chose being turned over Rebekah and allowed her to remain in stasis for half a century without rescue. Still, Klaus refused to turn Marcel until Marcel forced Klaus's hand while dying.

Power, revenge for the injustices of his early childhood, and an obsession with outstripping and one-upping the Mikaelson's, especially Klaus, for never feeling like a true member of the family are Marcel's primary motivating factors. Marcel has a complete ban on harming children, and will often step in if he sees them mistreated or used as he was. Marcel has perhaps an even greater capability for violence, deception, and cruelty than Klaus. But, unlike Klaus, Marcel is charismatic, likable, and diplomatic, making others more willing to listen to and like Marcel as a leader, despite his swift willingness to turn on those closest and most loyal to him if it would be to his own benefit. Marcel's charm and the Mikaelson sibling's affection for him (and therefore reluctance to kill him), are Marcel's greatest assets.

After the Originals were forced to flee New Orleans in 1919, Marcel chooses to take over the city and declare himself as king in the power void, rather than informing his adoptive family that he is still alive. Marcel is a popular king, who keeps the vampires happy with parties, rewards systems, and the promise of earning a Daylight Ring once they reach his inner circle. Marcel successfully subdued and drove out the werewolves using a curse, placates the humans with promises of a low death count and limiting attacks to tourists, and recently came into possession of a super weapon that allows him total control of the witches, banning them from using magic. All supernatural factions must follow the set of rules and edicts issued by Marcel. Marcel takes extreme pride in his ability to run the French Quarter under exclusive vampire rule and enjoys that he is better-liked than Klaus.

Conflict arises when the Originals return to the city and feel betrayed by Marcel's deception and what Klaus views as the theft of one of his proudest achievements: the city of New Orleans. All three siblings begin to work against Marcel. Klaus is envious of Marcel's success and the apparent love and loyalty of Marcel's followers and swears to take what he considers rightfully his and punish Marcel for allowing Klaus to mourn for him. Rebekah is angry that Marcel betrayed their relationship and moved on with no regrets. And Elijah will always be most loyal to his original siblings and seeks to support their desires and recreate the time when they were happiest: during their rule of New Orleans.

The deciding lynchpin for who will ultimately take the city is a young, 16-year-old witch, named Davina. Believing Davina was intended as a human sacrifice, Marcel, who again dislikes any mistreatment of children, slaughtered the witch community and rescued a grateful Davina. Davina has immense power, enough to subdue an Original, and aids Marcel in the quest of controlling the city. Marcel comes to love Davina and feels extremely protective and proprietary towards her, putting her into his care and under his protection.

Once Davina is removed from the equation, Klaus openly declares his intention to retake his city, and Marcel is forced to resentfully relinquish his rule in the face of Klaus's demonstration that everything Marcel has built is worthless in the face of Klaus's abilities as the Original Hybrid. Klaus, lonely and wishing for companionship, requests Marcel remain as his co-ruler, which Marcel happily accepts while plotting with Rebekah to take power back, and rubbing it in Klaus's face that Klaus will never be loved as a king.

Eventually, Marcel betrays both Rebekah, who wished Marcel would finally choose her, and Klaus, revealing that Marcel was the source of betrayal that led them to flee the city in the first place. Elijah banishes Marcel from the city as a consequence and takes de facto control.

Marcel becomes obsessed with taking back rulership and begins using guerrilla warfare tactics to incite a civil war among the city's supernatural factions and undermine Elijah's peace treaties. Marcel is especially opposed to Elijah's proposals since they grant power to the witches and werewolves, whom Marcel had formerly subjugated in favor of the vampires. The conflicts result in the death of Marcel's friend, Thierry, which incites Marcel to higher heights of violence. The Originals are still fond enough of Marcel to be reluctant to kill him, but their reservations for restraint become strained, eventually running out during a battle when Marcel rallies all of the vampires in New Orleans to attack the Mikaelson compound and stop the creation of Moonlight Rings, which would allow the werewolves power. Elijah proves he is more than capable of handling the entire population of vampires by himself, while Klaus easily subdues and bites Marcel. Already weakened by Elijah, all of Marcel's vampires are quickly finished off by the werewolves, and Marcel must find a way to lure Klaus back to the compound and bleed him in order to cure his friends.

Marcel saves the life of Klaus's baby and uses her to bring Klaus back to the compound, only to find that he is too late. Marcel apologizes for his previous betrayal, and is grateful for Marcel's interference and newly united against their common enemies, the witches and the werewolves, Klaus extends friendship and the two return to being allies. Marcel subdues his ultimate goal, to transcend Klaus and take back New Orleans, in order to gain the Original's help destroying the werewolves.

Marcel once again finds himself at war with the Original clan when Davina dies for another time and Marcel is desperate to resurrect her. The plan fails due to interference and Marcel blames all of the Mikaelson's, vowing revenge. Marcel maintains that Klaus is a true monster and not Marcel. In Give 'Em Hell Kid, Marcel becomes an Upgraded Original Vampire after Elijah kills Marcel out of fear of a prophecy without knowing Marcel had taken the serum.

With this new power, Marcel is finally stronger than the Originals and believes he would make a more benign and just ruler, having come to believe that the Mikaelson's are corrupt, egotistical monsters, unlike himself. Despite now having the ability to not only kill the Originals, but kill them all at once, Marcel Gerard "allows" the Mikaelson family to live in exchange for the city, and Klaus's eternal punishment of being pinned with a dagger that causes continuous pain and walled into the compound.

After Freya saves the Mikaelsons five years later they manage to rescue Klaus and Marcel agrees to let them live in exchange for the family leaving the city. However, the threat of the Hollow forces Marcel to reluctantly ally himself with the Originals once again against the greater threat. After the defeat of the Hollow, Klaus makes amends with Marcel, apologizing for failing Marcel as a father.

In the series finale, Marcel resumes his relationship with Rebekah as Klaus prepares to sacrifice himself to destroy the Hollow once and for all. Having put aside their differences, Marcel is devastated by Klaus' coming demise and joins the family in celebrating his life, promising to be there for Hope if she ever needs him. Marcel decides to leave New Orleans for good and take the remaining vampires with him, leaving the city to the humans. Rebekah proposes to Marcel, revealing that she intends to travel to Mystic Falls and take the cure so she can finally live out human life as she has always wanted. Despite the fact that he will one day lose her to old age, Marcel accepts her proposal and they set out together to live a new life.

==== In Legacies ====
In season four, Marcel joins the rest of the Mikaelson family in attempting to help Hope reconnect with her humanity. By this time, Marcel and Rebekah have gotten married and are happily sharing life together. The family is also holding a memorial service for Klaus whose ashes they have finally succeeded in magically gathering after three years of work. Their efforts to help Hope succeed and the Mikaelsons decide to send her Klaus' ashes to decide what to do with.

=== Davina Claire ===
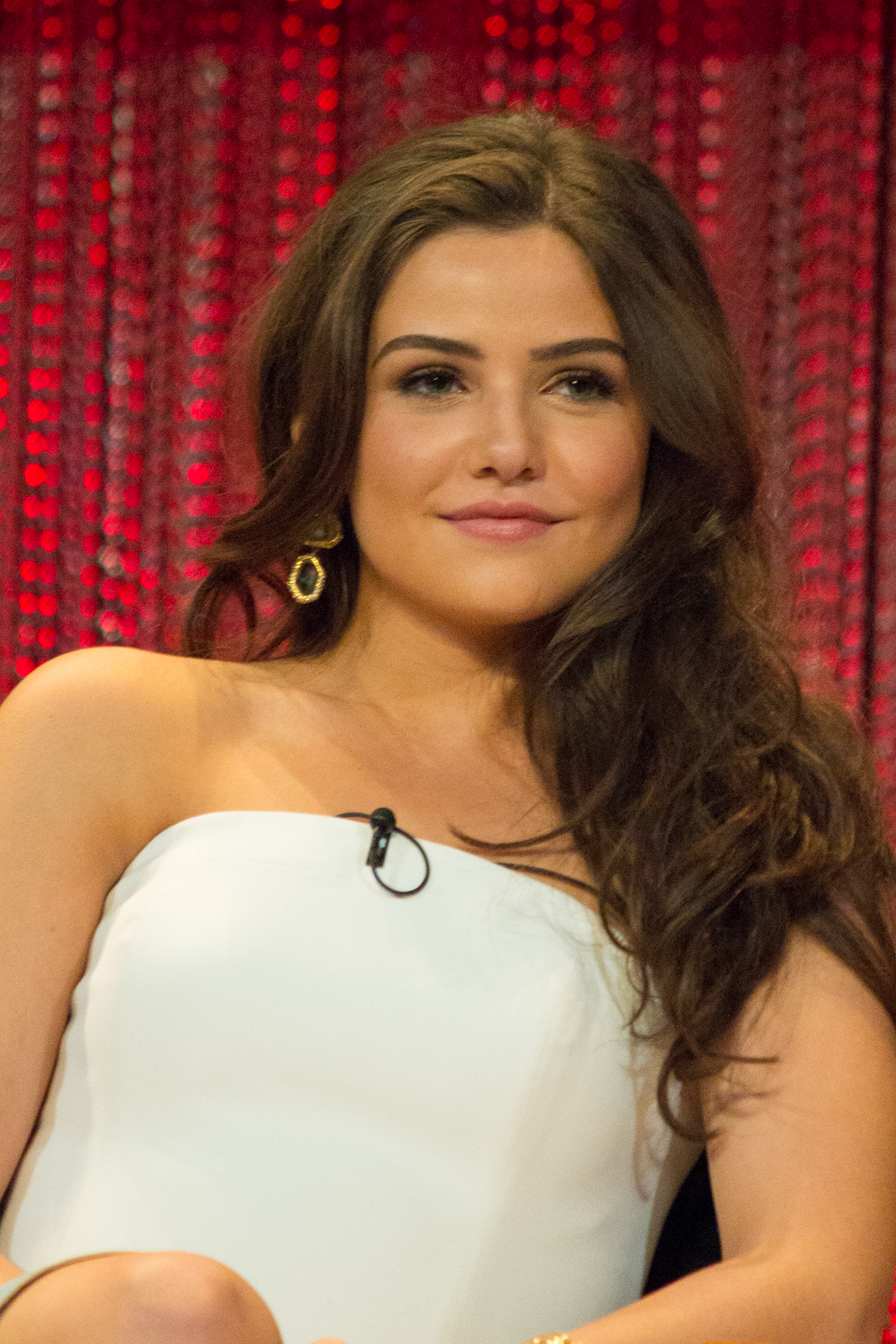
Danielle Campbell

- Played by Danielle Campbell
- TO starring seasons: 1–3
- TO recurring season: 4
- TO guest starring season: 5

Davina Claire is a nineteen-year-old witch with a dark side, and was born late 1994-early 1995 in New Orleans, presumably making her 16 at the beginning of the series. During the events of season one, she was still learning the full extent of her powers and had Marcel as her protector. Davina is in hiding from the witches of the Quarter as they would want to kill her to complete The Harvest. In the meantime, her powers are too much for her to handle and can result in a disaster if they were to get out of control. Finally, she was sacrificed for the sake of New Orleans. Unfortunately, when she died her powers did not go back to the Earth since they were stolen by Celeste. Following the death of Celeste, Davina was revived. In the final episode of season one, Davina brings the Originals' father Mikael back from the dead and tethers him to a bracelet that she controls.

In season two, Davina tries to find a way to unlink Marcel's and Josh's destiny to Klaus' so that Mikael can kill him. In a disc shop, she meets Kaleb and starts to bond with him, unaware that he's Kol Mikaelson. She still has Mikael under her control and when on a date with Kaleb they get attacked by the werewolves searching for the white oak stake, she summons him to help them and Elijah against the wolves. Because Elijah (and so Klaus) found out about Mikael being back, Davina runs off to hide in a cabin. She asks Mikael to teach her how to defend herself and be stronger but gets hurt and calls Kaleb to help her heal. Klaus finds her and attacks them, and she gets hit on the head. When she wakes up, Mikael is gone because Kaleb has unlinked her to him. She tries to finish her spell to unlink Marcel's and Josh's life to Klaus' and as she wants to channel Kaleb's powers to get stronger, she discovers the truth about him being Kol and unlinking her to Mikael. So, she wants to destroy the white oak stake and unable to do it, she allies with Kol to disable it for a moment. Davina manages to get the stake back and then runs off with Kaleb, still searching for how to get her revenge on Klaus. They agree on stabbing him with some dark knife Kol has kept over the years, and then putting on a coffin so that Marcel and Josh won't die. She wakes up one morning and finds out that Kol and the white oak stake are missing so she goes to Marcel and Josh to tell them. She apologizes for believing Kol was faithful to her, but Marcel tells her he kidnapped Kol with the stake to get them to Klaus. Davina manages to avoid Josh's surveillance and goes to Kol's secret lair. After using a spell, she confronts Klaus with the hopes to make him angry so that he would bite her and become poisoned. Later, she has to revive him when she learns that Cami is in danger and Kol is on Marcel's and Klaus' side to take Esther down. She helps Cami by successfully protecting her from Esther's spell and on the side, she continues plotting with Kol to create the dagger to take Klaus down. Kol is eventually hexed and killed by his brother Finn, who took control of Vincent Griffith's body. Davina later attempts to use her one shot at channeling the power of the Ancestors to properly resurrect Kol, but the Mikaelsons trick her into resurrecting Esther in her original body instead as they need Esther's blood to kill Dahlia. Davina is left furious about this betrayal and the failed opportunity to bring Kol back.

In season three, she joins the Strix's coven known as the Sisters in order to bring back her lover Kol Mikaelson being offered a powerful resurrection spell in exchange for her help. As a member of the Sisters, she performs a powerful spell to sever the Original bloodlines and she succeeds in severing Klaus' bloodline from him, though the intervention of the Mikaelsons, Marcel and Stefan Salvatore prevents Elijah's from being severed as well. With the bloodline severed, both Marcel and Josh are left safe if Klaus is killed. By channeling the power generated from the severing of Klaus' bloodline, Davina successfully resurrects Kol as an Original Vampire with the unintended side effect of resurrecting Finn as well. In revenge for Finn's earlier murder of Kol, Davina ties his soul to his body so that Finn can't jump into a witch body again as he wants. This has the side effect of Freya being unable to save Finn by putting him back into her pendant when he is killed by Lucien Castle. However, Davina is killed by Kol when the Ancestors take control of Kol, and her soul is torn apart by the Ancestors as a punishment for her actions. Vincent later restores Davina's soul and enlists her help to sever the Ancestral Plane from their world.

In season four, Vincent restores the connection between Earth and the Ancestral Plane by calling on Davina using the Harvest. Davina's spirit later shows Vincent the true origins of the Hollow and urges him to sacrifice Klaus in order to power a spell to lock the evil spirit away, revealing that Davina severing the link between the mortal world and the Ancestral Plane had released the evil spirit in the first place. Davina nearly succeeds in killing Klaus using Marcel's venom, but Hope intervenes and banishes Davina's spirit. Later, the Hollow resurrects Davina to manipulate Kol into helping her, linking herself to Davina so that any harm that befalls the Hollow also happens to Davina. With the help of Hope, Kol is able to successfully sever the link just before Hayley kills the Hollow. Although Davina suffers severe wounds from the battle before the link is severed, she had been visiting Josh at the time who is able to heal her with his blood. After saying goodbye to Josh, Davina and Kol decide to leave New Orleans to see the world. In the last episode of season 4, Kol has a diamond engagement ring made, intending to propose to Davina.

It is mentioned in the first episode of season 5 that Kol and Davina did indeed get married and now live in Belize. Davina later attends Freya and Keelin's wedding. She helps Hope in her struggles with the Hollow's spirit inside of her and offers Marcel advice on how to handle Declan.

In Legacies, it is mentioned that Davina was unable to attend Klaus' funeral, something that she was saddened by.

=== Sophie Deveraux ===
- Played by Daniella Pineda
- TVD guest starring season: 4
- TO starring season: 1

Sophie Deveraux is a fictional witch, antagonist, and main character in season 1 of The Originals.

==== In The Vampire Diaries ====
Sophie appears in the backdoor pilot of The Originals.

==== In The Originals ====
In the past, she was a light-hearted girl who enjoyed partying and didn't care much for witchcraft. However, 8 months before the start of the series, she watched her niece, Monique Deveraux, die in The Harvest, a sacrificial ritual that allows the witches in New Orleans to draw power from their ancestors. After that, she became more serious, obsessed with the goal of killing Davina so she can complete the ritual and bring her niece back from the dead. Sophie has made it clear that she will do whatever it takes to reach her goal, which makes her dangerous to have as an enemy. She was later killed by Monique.

She was linked to Hayley for a short period of time while Hayley was pregnant. This was to allow her to bargain with the Original Vampires. This meant that all that happened to Sophie also happened to Hayley. This caused a near miscarriage for Hayley. Just before Hayley miscarried Davina unlinked Sophie and Hayley, allowing Hayley's pregnancy to continue.

=== Cami O'Connell ===
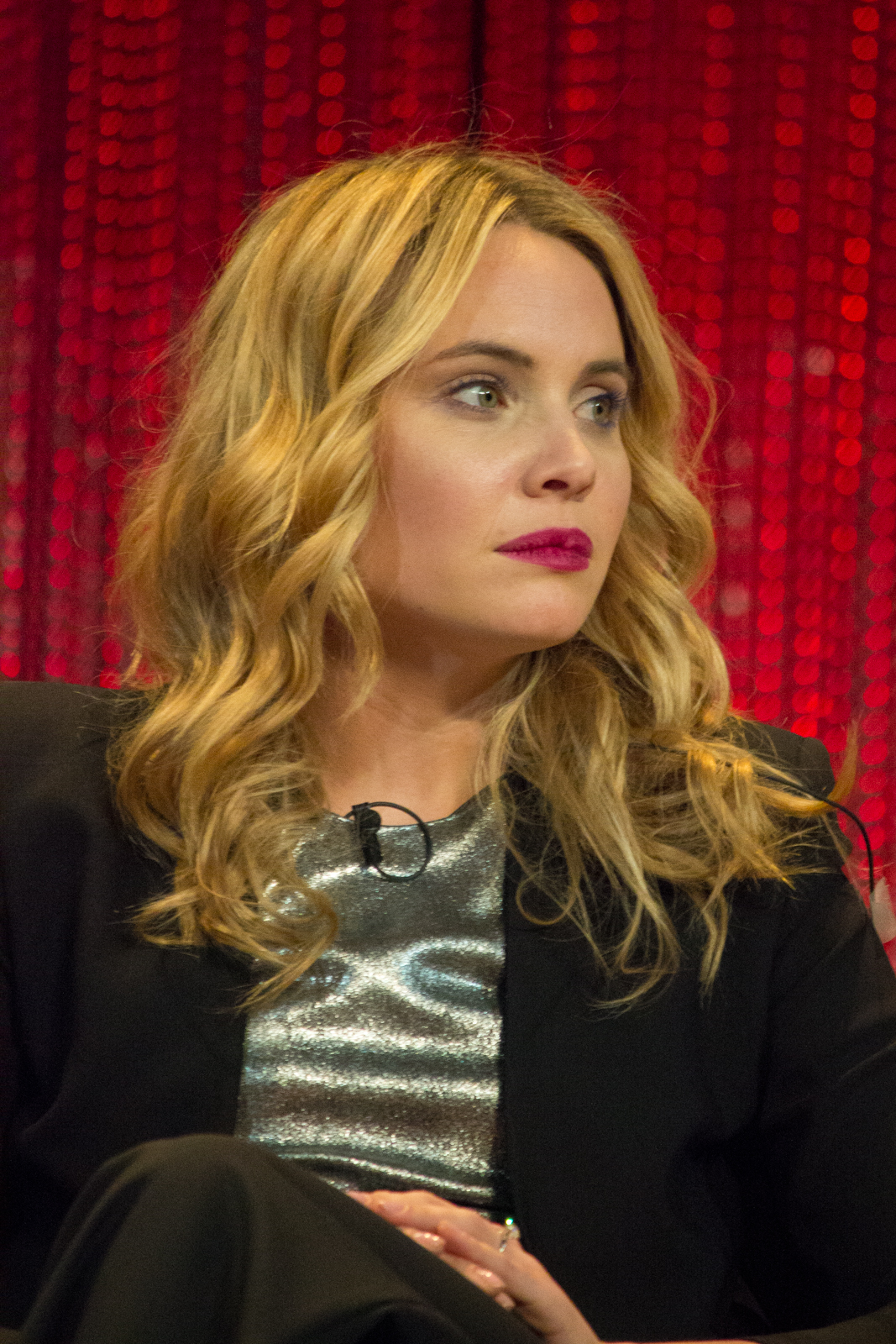
Leah Pipes

- Played by Leah Pipes
- TVD guest star season: 4 TO Backdoor Pilot
- TO starring seasons: 1–3
- TO special guest star seasons 4–5

Camille "Cami" O'Connell is a fictional bartender who is fascinated by the question of whether people can be born bad.

==== In The Vampire Diaries ====
Camille appears in the backdoor pilot of The Originals.

==== In The Originals ====
After an unimaginably tragic event in her family, Camille became a psychology student in order to study human behavior, in the hopes of proving that people can't just be "evil". Her fixation on the subject might just help her bond with Klaus, though Camille is unaware that her corner of New Orleans is crawling with supernatural beings who walk the line between good and evil. She is also fascinated and shares a love-hate relationship with Klaus, who has feelings for her. She also had a brief romance with Marcel, but that was only short-lived. Her uncle Kieran falls under a hex, when he goes mad from the hex, Camille has Klaus turn Kieran into a vampire in hopes of curing the hex. When it doesn't work, Kieran, going crazy and in transition, tries to kill Camille. Klaus saves her and kills Kieran. After her uncle's death, she gets a key, to an apartment her uncle owned. She discovers a secret room filled with supernatural weapons and books.

In season two, Camille tries to focus on her studies and meets with her new counselor, who is none other than Finn Mikaelson in Vincent's body. Later, she discovers the truth about him and allies with the vampires and the werewolves to help them take him down because she feels that he's got a crush on her. She's part of their plan to capture Finn and on a date with him, she lures him into an isolated alley where she gets attacked by a werewolf, which was Hayley. Later in the church, Cami is recovering with Hayley's blood and when Finn is down thanks to Jackson's arrows, she handcuffs him. On the same night, she is seen drinking in her bar when Esther comes and puts a spell on her. In the next few days, she doesn't recall Esther's spell and finds out when Hayley shows her. She seeks help from Davina, Kol, Marcel, and Klaus only to find out from Finn that Esther has been preparing her to welcome Rebekah into her body. As Finn doesn't want to help her, she waits for Esther's spell but is successfully protected by Davina and is still controlling her body.

In season three, Camille is turned into a vampire by Aurora de Martel (Klaus's ex-girlfriend) out of jealousy from Klaus's affection towards her. She was later bitten by Lucien Castle, after he became an Upgraded Original Vampire, also known as the Beast. Klaus, Elijah and Freya tried to find a cure for Lucien's venom, even trying to use his blood to cure Camille, only to find out that the Beast's blood cannot cure its own venom. Camille later dies peacefully in Klaus's arms, much to the latter's grief. Her death is later avenged by Klaus.

She is later seen through hallucinations by Klaus in seasons four and five.

=== Vincent Griffith ===
- Played by Yusuf Gatewood
- TO recurring seasons: 1–2
- TO starring seasons: 2–5

Vincent Griffith is a fictional powerful witch, who is the former Regent of the Nine Covens and a current member of the Tremé Coven. He was formerly married to Eva Sinclair. He is also the former host of the spirit of Finn Mikaelson during season two.

In Legacies season four, Vincent helps in the effort to reconnect Hope with her humanity by anchoring an astral projection spell to bring Hope's spirit back to New Orleans.

=== Freya Mikaelson ===
- Played by Riley Voelkel
- TO recurring season: 2
- TO starring seasons: 3–5
- LG special guest season: 2, 4
- Also played by Elle Graham (young Freya) into season 2

Freya Mikaelson is the firstborn child of Mikael and Esther, the eldest sister of Finn, Elijah, Kol, Rebekah, and Henrik, the maternal older half-sister of Niklaus, and the paternal aunt of Klaus' daughter with Hayley Marshall, Hope. She is a main character in The Originals. Freya was born in the late years of the 10th century to a Viking warrior named Mikael and his wife Esther. Her parents had met after her mother was captured during a Viking raid, and fell in love before marrying. Freya was their firstborn child. Her birth was a result of a deal her mother made with her aunt, Dahlia, who used magic to make the barren Esther able to have children of her own. She was, according to Esther, the apple of Mikael's eye. However, when she was five, Freya was taken by her aunt as part of Esther's deal when Esther was pregnant with Elijah, and her life following that is a mystery. Esther claimed that she was the victim of a plague in order to cover up what she and Dahlia had done, which is what caused Mikael and Esther to move from Norway to a village in a "mystical land" far away in the New World, which was later called Mystic Falls.

They moved there under the advisement of Esther's dear friend and mentor, a witch named Ayana, who told them that the inhabitants were extremely healthy and had increased strength and speed. These villagers were later revealed to be werewolves. In The Vampire Diaries, Freya was mentioned by Elijah, when he explained to Elena that his mother and father had seven children, and again by Rebekah, when she told Elena the story about how her family ended up in Mystic Falls. Rebekah explained that their parents had lost a child in Europe to the plague and that later, Esther, Mikael, and Ayana moved to Mystic Falls, where Mikael and Esther eventually had the rest of their children, excluding Finn and Elijah, who were born in the Old World. It was also said that Freya's death is what made Mikael become so cruel and abusive, as she was his favorite child.

==== In The Originals ====
In Wheel Inside the Wheel, it was revealed that Freya had not been killed by the plague, but was instead given to Dahlia as payment for reversing Esther's infertility and allowing her to have her children. The payment stated that Esther was to give Dahlia Freya, the firstborn child of each of her children, and every subsequent firstborn child for as long as Esther's line will last. Dahlia used a spell to increase her power, while also binding Freya's power to Dahlia's. Freya lived under Dahlia for many years, ostensibly as a member of her coven, but in reality, Freya was more of a slave. Dahlia poisoned Freya's mind, telling her that her mother did not want her, and that Dahlia was all she had. When Dahlia learned that Esther had turned her children into the first vampires, and thus ended her bloodline, the weight of carrying on Dahlia's plans fell onto Freya, who swore that she would never fall in love or have a child, in order to spare any child, the fate of being Dahlia's. When Dahlia attempted to cast her pseudo-immortality spell on both of them, Freya at first resisted, only to have Dahlia force it on them. For centuries they existed, slumbering for a century while their aging arrested and their power magnified, to then live for a single year.

Freya met and fell in love with a man named Mathias, and a child was conceived between them. They attempted to escape from Dahlia, however, she easily tracked them down and placed a death hex on Freya's lover. Depressed and in pain, Freya drank from a deadly poison in an attempt to kill both herself and her unborn son, so that they could both be free from Dahlia. However, much to her horror, she discovered that part of the immortality ritual was a powerful protection spell that prevented them from being killed, however, as the spell was not cast upon Freya's child, he was truly lost, leaving Freya a sobbing mess in Dahlia's arms.

In 1914, she befriended Kol and was his "date" during a Christmas party at the Abattoir to get a glimpse of her family. Rebekah, recognizing Freya as the witch that Kol had brought to the party to accompany him, approached her and insisted that she could do better than Kol. Freya told her that it wasn't really date before Rebekah made to join the rest of the Mikaelsons and Marcel on the staircase for Klaus' speech. This marked the first time that the two Mikaelson sisters had met in their lives, and Rebekah remained unaware that she had met her older sister until a century later when they both escaped from the witch asylum together. During Klaus' speech, Kol and Freya toasted each other from across the room, but the cheerful and festive night quickly took a dramatic turn when Klaus publicly condemned Kol's treachery and she witnessed Kol getting daggered by Klaus. She later went into the Dowager Fauline Cottage, seeing it as the safest place to be during her century of sleep and because she knew her aunt wouldn't come there.

Entering a deep sleep that lasted a century, she awoke 100 years later when she discovered that her sister, Rebekah, had been imprisoned in the Asylum in the body of a young witch. Posing as an inmate, she witnessed Rebekah's confrontations with the Kindred and Cassie's betrayal. Using her magic, Freya saved Rebekah from the Kindred and broke the spell on the Asylum, freeing herself and Rebekah.

When Freya reunites with her brother Finn, he informs her of Hope's life, which inspires Freya (who wishes to take revenge against Dahlia for the deaths of her lover and son) so she can kill her as Dahlia would come for her niece, so she affiliates herself with her siblings. At the end of a hard long magical struggle (resulting in the death of both her parents), Freya and her younger siblings finally managed to defeat Dahlia, with Freya's finally winning her younger brothers' trust (especially Niklaus), and moving into their house as Hope's caretaker and an official Mikaelson sibling. However, as a side effect of Dahlia's death, Freya lost her immortality which was linked to Dahlia's.

After a few months of peace in the supernatural community in New Orleans, troubles started again with the arrival of Lucien Castle, Klaus's first progeny, and his warnings of war between the sire-lines, and so, Freya's enormous magical powers were needed again to protect her family from harm. During this time, Freya is reunited with Kol, who is resurrected by Davina Claire, and Finn who is inadvertently resurrected as a side effect of the same spell. However, this reunion doesn't last long before Lucien becomes a new type of Original Vampire and kills Finn. Freya later manages to reverse the spell that gave Lucien his extra power, giving Klaus and Elijah the chance to kill him.

Freya once again showcased her great skill and power in the season three series finale. Freya, looking for a way to save her family quickly and uniquely, adapts two ancient spells to save her siblings. In order for her spell to work, she utilized Esther's linking spell, binding each sibling, including herself, to Klaus, while she replicated her aunt Dahlia's immortality slumber spell, (replicated for the first time in over 10 centuries). She also took a page from Finn's spell book and drew everyone, save Klaus, into a Chambre de Chasse, so that they could be a family while slumbering, in order to escape death (while Klaus lived and suffered). That was the only way to save herself and the others until Hayley found a cure to their ailments. During this time, Freya became immortal once again since she was linked to Klaus, who became the anchor to her spell. The slumber spell acts as a protection against all forms of harm; therefore, Elijah and Kol will not die from Marcel's bite and Freya will not succumb to the fatal toxin. Rebekah is currently no longer suffering from the insanity hex since she was pulled into the Chambre de Chasse.

At the start of season 4, she is awoken by Hayley for five years and is successful in curing her siblings. She heads to New Orleans to help rescue Klaus from Marcel along with Hayley and her brothers. When they return to the city and face the Hollow her magic is called upon to try and defeat it. She also meets and holds captive a werewolf named Keelin whose venom she needs to create a cure for Marcel's deadly venom. At first, their relationship is rocky due to the circumstances, but when they complete their weapon to save Marcel, they form a friendship. Eventually, the two starts dating after Freya almost died and stay with her after Freya's family is forced to leave. However, during this time, an evil spirit called the Hollow arises to endanger New Orleans. The Hollow kills Elijah and his entire sireline in order to gain the power to resurrect herself, but Freya manages to save Elijah's soul inside of her pendant as she once did with Finn. Freya and Hope perform their first spell together to save Elijah whose soul is left fractured inside of the pendant until they manage to fix it. Freya subsequently manages to resurrect Elijah with the same spell that had resurrected the Hollow by channeling the power of the Hollow's death at the hands of Hayley. When the Hollow's spirit possesses Hope after her death, the Mikaelson siblings split it up between Klaus, Elijah, Rebekah, and Kol who separate across the world in order to keep the Hollow subdued.

In season 5, she is still in New Orleans, with Keelin, trying to find a way to reunite her family. After Hayley goes missing, to which she breaks up with Keelin, and Hope goes back to school, and she heads there and spends time with her. At Hayley's funeral, Keelin returns to comfort her as she tries to comfort Hope. She and Keelin then get engaged with Freya, proposing. They spend the morning in bed together and decide to wed each other that day, Freya then decides not to have children which initially upsets Keelin, and the wedding is off. Freya talks with Rebekah and then returns to Keelin saying that she is willing to have that talk. The two get married. In the series finale, Freya asks Vincent to father their child, and while he initially says no, he eventually changes his mind. Freya joins her family in saying goodbye to Klaus and Elijah after Klaus decides to sacrifice himself to destroy the Hollow for good and Elijah decides to die with his brother.

==== In Legacies ====
In season 2, Josie travels to New Orleans seeking Freya for her help with a memory spell. She is revealed to have a son called Nik. She confronts Josie who blasts her with the spell and leaves her unconscious. She is seen in Mystic Falls and calls out to Hope (who she now remembers), and they have an emotional reunion.

In season 4, Alaric calls Freya as Hope prepares to become the tribrid since Freya wanted to be there for such a momentous occasion. When Hope is ready, Freya initiates her transition into the tribrid by magically stopping Hope's heart. At the request of Alaric, Freya, Rebekah, Marcel, and Kol magically pull the humanity-less Hope to New Orleans where they are having a memorial service for Klaus, the family has spent the past three years magically gathering Klaus' ashes. The Mikaelsons attempt to help Hope reconnect with her humanity, eventually succeeding. The family then decides to send Klaus' ashes to Hope to decide what to do with them.

=== Josh Rosza ===
- Played by Steven Krueger
- TO recurring seasons: 1–4
- TO starring season: 5

Joshua "Josh" Rosza is a vampire. He is one of Marcel's top right-hand men as well as an out-and-proud homosexual. As a human, he was best friends with a girl named Tina. Josh went to New Orleans with Tina and was invited to a party that was hosted by Marcel. Josh and Tina were subsequently attacked by vampires and were severely injured. Klaus discovered vampire blood in their systems and ultimately snapped their necks. The next day, Marcel flipped a coin; the winner would remain a vampire and the other would be killed. Tina ended up grabbing the coin, but the exercise was revealed to be a test of loyalty; she failed. Tina was killed, and Josh was allowed to live on as a vampire.

It was later revealed that right after Josh turned up in New Orleans and had vampire blood in his system, Klaus Mikaelson broke his and his friend's neck to create spies for himself against Marcel and his empire. Once Josh completed his transition into a vampire, Klaus compelled him to be his spy, his eyes and ears. Josh seemed to be an effective spy for him by helping him drain a vampire off vervain and framing Marcel's best friend Thierry. But after his compulsion was removed by Davina, he betrayed Klaus and sent him to an ambush. After that, he lay low and stayed hidden from Klaus.

Josh met Davina after Marcel discovers Klaus' compulsion upon him, he requests Davina to free him in order to work as his spy. Josh is initially fearful of her although warms up to her after they bond over music, whilst Davina works her painful spell. After Josh's compulsion is lifted, they laugh over their differing views of "normal" and they are both noticeably sad when Marcel wants Josh to forget her. They "pinky promise" that Josh would keep her secret in exchange to keep his memories, as he says it's nice to talk to somebody again. Whilst Josh is stuck in the shadows without a daylight ring, he is expressively fearful of Klaus and Davina promises to protect him.

In season two, Josh meets Aiden in Live and Let Die, when Josh is living at Marcel's loft with the rest of the new vampires, checking his cell phone. Marcel asks him about any prospects and Josh informs him that there is this one guy he's been messaging with and that he really likes him. When Marcel asks what the problem is, Josh then expresses doubt about having any kind of normal relationship on account of his need for blood to survive. Before the conversation can go any further, someone is thrown through the window. The loft is suddenly swarmed by werewolves wearing Moonlight Rings. Aiden is revealed to be a werewolf and the leader of this attack group of wolves. Aiden tells Marcel that the deal of the vampires staying out of the Quarter is over and that the vampires must leave New Orleans entirely. To prove his point, Aiden has one of the other werewolves bite a vampire. When another goes for Josh, Aiden calls them off and warns Marcel that they need to be gone when they come back, because he won't call them off next time.

At the end of the episode, Josh is at Bywater Tavern, glancing at his phone and looking a little nervous, when Aiden comes in and it's revealed that he is the guy Josh has been messaging on the dating app. After a brief conversation, the two decide to pretend they're not at war for the night and just be themselves.

In the episode Chasing the Devil's Tail, Josh is at Marcel's loft with Aiden, Hayley, and Marcel as they all outline a plan to take out Vincent. Cami soon shows up with a box full of dark objects that are able to take down a witch. Josh makes a joke of it, "Sweet it's a big box of dusty old junk. We're saved", which Aiden laughs at. At this point, Josh and Aiden begin seeing each other romantically and in secret, worried about their respective groups finding out about their vampire-werewolf, same-sex romance that might threaten both of their lives.

In the episode Gonna Set Your Flag on Fire when the rest of the vampires and werewolves are trapped at Marcel's compound by a witch's spell, Josh and Aiden fully acknowledge their love for each other. A short while later, Josh confides in Marcel about his romance with Aiden who reacts supportively to it. At the same time, Jackson tells Aiden about him being aware of Aiden's involvement with Josh, a vampire, and cautions him about proceeding with it.

In the episode I Love You, Goodbye Josh finally decides to go public with his romance with Aiden when they both attend Hayley and Jackson's wedding at Marcel's compound when he and Aiden sit side by side. In episode City Beneath the Sea, Aiden is brutally murdered by Dahlia who sets it up to make it look like Klaus murdered him by tearing out his heart in an attempt to further divide the werewolves and vampires against each other. Josh and Davina find his body later, which devastates him. In the next episode, Josh attends Aiden's funeral in the bayou alongside the other werewolves despite the tensions still lingering between the two supernatural groups.

In season 3, Josh continues his role as Marcel's right-hand man as war brews between the three surviving vampire sirelines and Marcel sides with the Strix against the Mikaelsons. Davina continues her efforts to unlink the sirelines, motivated in part by a desire to protect Marcel and Josh should Klaus die. Davina succeeds in unlinking Klaus' sireline, rendering him vulnerable to all of his enemies. However, shortly after Davina resurrects Kol Mikaelson, she is killed by Kol due to an insanity hex placed upon him by the Ancestors, devastating Josh at the loss of his best friend.

In season 4, it's revealed that he is dating a human named Eddie (played by Keahu Kahuanui), although this eventually ends as Josh is never able to move on from Aiden's death. Josh also helps Marcel and the Mikaelsons in their efforts to fight the Hollow. After Davina is resurrected by the Hollow, she briefly reunites with Josh to say goodbye to her best friend before leaving town for good with Kol, Josh having often spoken to Davina's grave following her death. Davina reassures Josh that she has always heard him and been there for him, even as a spirit.

In the missing years between seasons 4 and 5, Josh remains in New Orleans, trying to maintain the peace between the vampires, wolves, and witches, along with the help of Freya and Vincent. When a group of purist vampires starts killing halfbreeds, including Hayley Marshall, Marcel returns to the city, and Josh and Vincent work with him to keep the city safe. When Marcel is lured into a trap by the purists who want to extract the venom from his fangs, Josh successfully rescues him, but he is injected with Marcel's venom during a fight. He dies moments later in Marcel's arms. He is later seen reunited with Aiden in the afterlife, after having spent 15 years apart.

=== Hope Mikaelson ===
- Played by uncredited infant actors (seasons 1–3), Summer Fontana (season 4), and Danielle Rose Russell (season 5, Legacies season 1–4)
- TO guest season: 1
- TO recurring seasons: 2–4
- TO starring season: 5
- LG starring season: 1–4

==== In The Vampire Diaries ====
In season four, Hope is conceived by Klaus Mikaelson and Hayley Marshall when they have sex at a party.

==== In The Originals ====
Hope Andrea Mikaelson, sometimes referred to as Hope Marshall, is Klaus Mikaelson and Hayley Marshall's extremely powerful daughter who, apart from being a vampire-werewolf hybrid, is also a first-born Mikaelson witch, making her a "mythical" and the only one of her kind, a tribrid. Moreover, her vampire side is that of an Original vampire, making her almost invincible and more powerful than average vampires and her werewolf side is that of an alpha werewolf, through Hayley, making her royalty among the werewolves, the Princess of the Crescent pack. For most of her time on The Originals, only Hope's witch nature is activated. However, in season five, while killing a large group of attacking vampires with magic, Hope accidentally kills a human and activates her werewolf gene, making Hope a witch-werewolf hybrid as she has not yet activated her vampire side and she is thus not the tribrid yet. With the darkness of the Hollow consuming Hope, her father Klaus enlists the help of Alaric, Josie, and Lizzie Saltzman to draw it out of her and into himself before Klaus sacrifices himself to destroy the Hollow for good, leaving Hope orphaned as her mother was killed earlier in the season during a fight with vampire purists.

==== In Legacies ====
Originally at her school, the Salvatore Boarding School, she is referred to as Hope Marshall to keep her identity as Klaus' daughter secret to reduce her chances of becoming the target of one or more of his many enemies. However, by the time Legacies premiered this was retconned and everyone at the school knows her real name and her lineage. An integral part of the launch of Legacies, Hope finally showed that she is more than her darkened lineage, until that is, she threw herself into Malivore to save her boyfriend Landon Kirby and the world, erasing herself from existence.

In season 2, Hope discovers that her presence inside of Malivore is toxic to him and Malivore repeatedly attempts to expel her whenever Hope performs magic, but she refuses to go when Malivore's golem son Ryan Clarke tries to escape with her, despite Ryan's attempts to convince Hope that he is not evil. Hope eventually manages to escape without Ryan, but he follows shortly thereafter anyways and poses as the Salvatore School's new headmaster Professor Vardemus. Along with dealing with Ryan, Hope has to restore everyone's memories of her and face the renewed threat of the Necromancer and Malivore's monsters as well as navigate a romantic relationship with Landon.

In season 3, Hope and her friends manage to lock both Malivore and the Necromancer inside of a new prison world along with all of Malivore's monsters. However, as a consequence, Landon becomes trapped as well and Hope becomes obsessed with rescuing her boyfriend. Although Hope is apparently successful at first, she discovers that it is a trick by new student Cleo, who seeks to use Hope's power to destroy Malivore for good. Landon eventually returns as does a resurrected Ryan Clarke, who is now human and seeks to aid Hope to destroy his father. However, Hope discovers that Landon has been possessed by Malivore, granting Malivore physical form to cause destruction and putting Hope into a moral quandary as any attempt to kill Malivore could kill Landon as well.

In season 4, in order to destroy Malivore for good, Hope decides to become a fully-activated tribrid as the tribrid is Malivore's only weakness. After her aunt Freya magically induces cardiac arrest, Hope's vampire nature is activated and she transitions into the tribrid, retaining her magical powers as a witch, the ability to shapeshift into a werewolf, and the bloodlust of a vampire. Much like the Originals, Hope is left with a weakness to a single type of wood, in her case from a Red Oak Tree that she had created with Josie and Lizzie Saltzman shortly before becoming the tribrid. As the tribrid, Hope effortlessly destroys Malivore with a sword made out of her own blood, but she is forced to kill Landon in the process. Emotionally devastated, Hope turns off her humanity to cope, leaving her as a sociopath who has no care for those around her, including her friends and loved ones. Hope attacks Alaric, leaving him comatose and later permanently crippled, and teams up with Aurora De Martel, an old enemy of the Mikaelson family who had been locked up by her father years before. With the threat of several gods rising, Alaric calls upon the Mikaelsons to help Hope reconnect with her humanity, leading to a battle between Hope and her dark side. After Hope kills her dark side, she regains control of her body, and Hope's emotions are reactivated, later permanently purging her dark side with Lizzie's help. Back to normal and with her full powers as the tribrid, Hope joins the fight to contain the gods that she had helped to unleash. Hope succeeds in killing Ken, the god attempting to kill everyone, and makes amends with Aurora, who sacrifices herself to save Hope.

In the series finale, Hope receives her father's ashes just as Alaric prepares to shut down the school for good. Conflicted, Hope summons Landon, now the Ferryman for the dead, and asks him to bring her Klaus' spirit, having been told by the Necromancer that Klaus can't find Peace until she does. Learning that Klaus is already at Peace, Landon instead arranges for Klaus to send Hope a final message from Peace with the help of Ethan Machado. Hope and Lizzie succeed in convincing Alaric to keep the school open, but he leaves Caroline Forbes as the headmaster instead while leaving to write the definitive history of all of the supernatural beings that he's ever known. Before Alaric leaves, he and Hope acknowledge their father-daughter relationship and Hope decides to send Ken's spear, the only weapon left that can kill her, to Josie in Belgium in case it is ever needed again. Hope scatters Klaus' ashes at the school before joining Caroline in welcoming a new class of students home.

== Recurring characters ==
The following is a list of characters that are, or at one time were, recurring guests on the series. They are listed in the order that they first appeared on the show.

Special guest appearances by The Vampire Diaries the main cast are also listed at the bottom of this table.

Key
= Recurring cast (actor appears in two or more episodes that season)
= Guest cast (actor appears in only one episode that season)

Character	Actor	Seasons				
Character	Actor	1	2	3	4	5
Kol Mikaelson	Nathaniel Buzolic	Guest	Guest	Recurring	Recurring	Recurring
Sabine Laurent	Shannon Kane	Recurring				
Diego	Eka Darville	Recurring				
Thierry Vanchure	Callard Harris	Recurring				
Mikael	Sebastian Roché	Recurring	Recurring		Guest	Guest
Kieran O'Connell	Todd Stashwick	Recurring				
Monique Deveraux	Yasmine Al Bustami	Recurring				
Genevieve	Elyse Levesque	Recurring				
Jackson Kenner	Nathan Parsons	Recurring	Recurring	Recurring	Guest	Guest
Oliver	Chase Coleman	Recurring	Recurring			
Francesca Correa	Peta Sergeant	Recurring	Guest			
Cassie	Natalie Dreyfuss	Guest	Recurring			
Kaleb Westphall	Daniel Sharman		Recurring			
Gia	Nishi Munshi		Recurring			
Lenore Shaw	Sonja Sohn		Recurring			
Aiden L.	Colin Woodell		Recurring			Guest
Eva Sinclair	Maisie Richardson-Sellers		Recurring	Guest	Guest	
Mary Dumas	Debra Mooney		Recurring	Guest	Guest	
Josephine LaRue	Meg Foster		Recurring			
Dahlia	Claudia Black		Recurring			
Lucien Castle	Andrew Lees			Recurring		
Tristan de Martel	Oliver Ackland			Recurring		
Aurora de Martel	Rebecca Breeds			Recurring		
Finn Mikaelson	Caspar Zafer			Recurring		
Detective Will Kinney	Jason Dohring			Recurring	Guest	
Aya Al-Rashid	Tracy Ifeachor			Recurring		
Sofya Voronova	Taylor Cole			Guest	Recurring	
Keelin	Christina Moses				Recurring	Recurring
Dominic	Darri Ingolfsson				Recurring	
Inadu "The Hollow"	Blu Hunt				Recurring	
Declan	Torrance Coombs					Recurring
Roman Sienna	Jedidiah Goodacre					Recurring
Lisina	Alexis Louder					Recurring
Greta Sienna	Nadine Lewington					Recurring
Ivy	Shiva Kalaiselvan					Recurring
Antoinette Sienna	Jaime Murray					Recurring
Guests From The Vampire Diaries
Tyler Lockwood	Michael Trevino	Guest				
Tatia	Nina Dobrev		Guest			
Stefan Salvatore	Paul Wesley			Guest		
Matt Donovan	Zach Roerig			Guest		
Alaric Saltzman	Matt Davis				Guest	Guest
Caroline Forbes	Candice King					Recurring

=== Kol Mikaelson ===
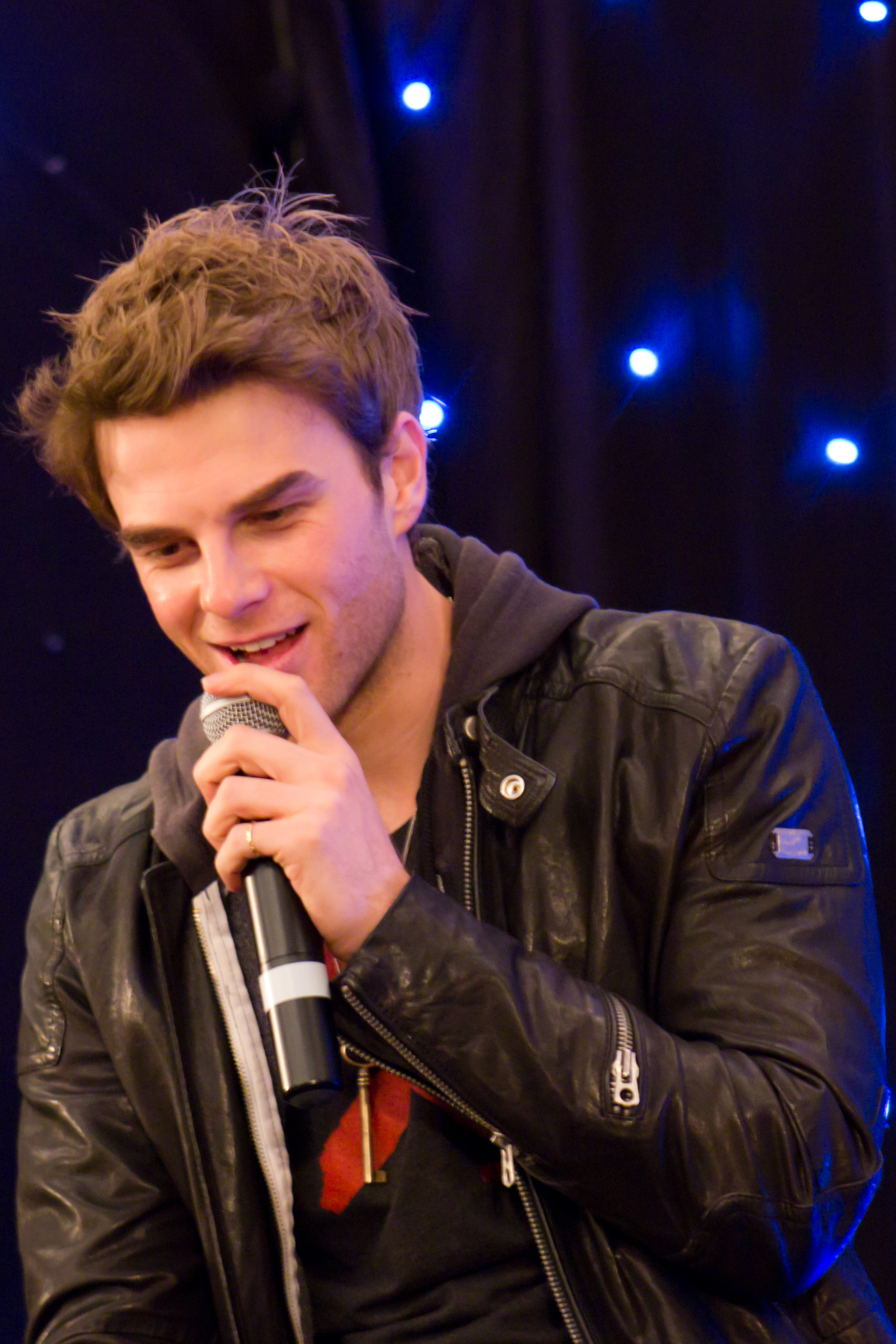
Nathaniel Buzolic

- Played by Nathaniel Buzolic/Daniel Sharman
- TVD recurring seasons: 3–5
- TO guest starring season: 1
- TVD guest starring season: 5
- TO recurring seasons: 2–5
- Also played by Roman Spink (young Kol) in season 2

Kol Mikaelson is the youngest son of the Original Family, since the death of his younger brother Henrik and the second youngest child still living, being older than Rebekah.

==== In The Vampire Diaries ====
He tries to kill Matt Donovan for entertainment during the Originals' family ball but is stopped by Damon Salvatore.

In the season three episode, "Heart of Darkness", Kol appears in Denver, Colorado, where Elena and Damon had sent Jeremy, to get him away from Mystic Falls and protect his life. He threatens to hurt Jeremy, in order to prevent Elena and Damon from trying to find out the history of Damon's bloodline, (if they managed to do so, they might find out that Elena's friends are not descended from Kol, which would allow them to kill him). Damon drives a baseball bat through Kol's body in order to debilitate him so that he, Elena, and Jeremy can escape. Kol later appears at the house of Mary Porter, the vampire who sired Rose. Kol kills Mary, so that she is not able to tell Elena and Damon about the history of her bloodline, which could lead them to find out which Original vampires Damon, Stefan, Caroline, Tyler, and Abby Bennett are descended from, (Mary sired Rose, Katherine Pierce forced Rose to sire her, and Katherine later sired Damon and Stefan; Damon sired Caroline, Abby, and Elena).

In season four, Kol returns to aid Rebekah in finding the rumored "cure" for vampirism. He tortures Professor Shane, who supposedly knows how to get the cure. When Kol realizes that Shane plans to release Silas, the first and most dangerous immortal being of all time, Kol stabs Shane through the torso with a wooden object, killing him. However, Bonnie is able to save Shane's life through an "expression", or dark magic spell. Kol compels Damon to kill Jeremy so that they cannot find Silas, but Stefan locks Damon away so that he cannot.

Elena and Jeremy decide to try and kill Kol because he is trying to stop them from getting the cure. Since Jeremy needs to kill vampires to complete the map to the cure, they conclude that if they kill Kol, which also kills his whole line of vampires, the map will be complete. Elena lures Kol into the house and waits for Jeremy to bring Bonnie, but he does not make it in time. Elena and Jeremy are talking later when Kol appears, storms into the house, and tries to cut off Jeremy's hunting arm. Elena rescues Jeremy and corners Kol in the kitchen. During the altercation, Jeremy showers Kol in water mixed with vervain. While Kol is stunned, Jeremy stabs him with the white oak stake, and he dies. Meanwhile, Klaus is watching in the doorway, furious, unable to help his brother because he has not been invited in. He vows to avenge his brother's death, swearing to kill Jeremy, Elena, and anyone else involved.

After the Veil is dropped by Bonnie, Kol's ghost plots with the others who died in the search for the cure to get revenge and attempts to force Bonnie to drop the Veil completely for him and his new friends. Revealing that she's now a ghost too, Bonnie tricks and traps Kol who is later inadvertently released by Elena. However, Bonnie restores the Veil before Kol can get his revenge, banishing Kol back to the Other Side.

In season five, Matt Donovan encounters Kol's ghost on the Other Side following his death at the hands of a Traveler. Aware that the Gilbert Ring will soon resurrect Matt, Kol warns him that the Other Side is collapsing and it's threatening to take all of the souls trapped there with it. When Matt's sister is dragged away, Kol shows some sympathy for Matt's grief, possibly thinking of his own siblings. Kol begs Matt to remember what Kol has told him when he returns to his body and warn everyone else about what is happening on the Other Side. When the Other Side later collapses completely, Kol is not seen amongst the souls that are present.

==== In The Originals ====
In season one, Kol's corpse appears, stabbed, on the ship that brought the Mikaelsons to New Orleans.

In season two, Kol returns in the body of a young Witch named Kaleb Westphall, along with his brother Finn and their mother who returned at the end of season one. Kol wants revenge on his brothers Klaus and Elijah and helps his mother with her plans. He starts by getting close to the witch Davina, earning her trust and showing her his powers. But he becomes attached to her and hides information from his mother (the return of Mikael). Klaus discovers Kaleb's true identity in Red Door. Kol/Kaleb spends most of his time with Davina to get the white oak stake for his mother. Kol tells Davina about his past, about all the magical objects he's collected over the years, and the plan he's been thinking of; to dagger Klaus and lock him in a coffin.

When Davina falls asleep, he is captured along with the white oak stake by Marcel and brought back to Klaus and Elijah. Marcel and Klaus, convince him to participate in the plan to take Esther down. But Kol has still had something on his mind since 1914 when he tried to steal a "Fauline diamond" to create the dagger. During that era, Kol was involved with a witch named Mary-Alice Claire and taught her magic, most notably being the technique known as Kemiya. When he stole the diamond, he asked Rebekah to be part of his plan but after she agreed, he found out she betrayed him by telling Klaus. Klaus daggered him with the help of Elijah. Klaus also trapped his girlfriend and her friend in a mansion.

In the present day, as their mother performs her spell, Kol gets his revenge by transferring Rebekah into a witch's body trapped in the mansion. He now has everything he needs: he got the diamond back as part of the deal to ally against Esther, Klaus will be occupied looking for Rebekah and Davina will be helping him with the dagger. Davina convinces Kol to help her rescue a captured Josh. Unfortunately, that leads to Kol being cursed by Finn during the rescue mission. Finn curses Kol to die in a few days. During his last days, Kol reconciles with his family and helps Davina finish the dagger so that she can protect herself. He dies surrounded by his family members and the girl he loved. Kol's body is consecrated as a New Orleans witch so that he can reside in the Ancestral Plane. Using her one-shot connection to the Ancestors' power as the Regent of the New Orleans covens, Davina attempts to resurrect Kol, but the Mikaelsons are forced to trick her into resurrecting Esther instead in order to defeat Dahlia. Rebekah later sets out to find a way to resurrect her brother.

In season three, Rebekah and Davina continue their efforts to resurrect Kol. The Strix, an ancient order of vampires, originally created by Elijah, offer Davina a resurrection spell in exchange for her help with their own plans. With Josh's help, Davina visits Kol in the Ancestral Plane where she sees Kol in his true form for the first time. Kol dismisses the resurrection spell as a fake, but she later realizes that Kol is just lying to protect her. Kol holds off the Ancestors so that Davina can escape when they come after her. Davina later summons Kol's ghost to help her figure out the final ingredient to unlink the sirelines which proves to be Hayley's heart. After succeeding in breaking Klaus' sireline, Davina channels the power generated by the unlinking and successfully resurrects Kol as an Original Vampire, although the spell has the unintended side effect of resurrecting Finn as well, much to Kol's displeasure. Kol reluctantly restrains himself from exacting revenge upon his brother at Freya's behest and eventually gains an understanding of him, mourning Finn's death after he is killed by Lucien Castle. Following his resurrection, Kol finds himself with an uncontrollable thirst which proves to be because the Ancestors had corrupted Kol's resurrection in order to get revenge upon Davina for her defiance of them. Eventually, Kol kills Davina under the Ancestors' influence and attempts to protect her spirit and resurrect Davina. However, Freya is forced to release Davina in order to channel the Ancestors' power to defeat Lucien, leaving Davina at the Ancestors' mercy who shred her soul. Kol and Vincent later help Davina put herself back together and enlist her help to sever the Ancestral Plane from Earth, forever separating Kol from the love of his life. Shortly thereafter, Marcel acts against the Mikaelsons using his new powers, fatally biting Kol and Elijah and inflicting other fatal inflictions upon Freya and Rebekah. In order to save them, the Mikaelsons are put into suspended animation and tied to Klaus' life until a cure can be found.

In season four, five years later, Hayley succeeds in finding a way to cure Kol and his siblings who free Klaus. Banished from New Orleans by Marcel, Kol and Rebekah decide to leave to find new lives, but they are drawn back after witnessing the deaths of several vampires and realizing that Elijah is dead. The Hollow, an ancient evil that was able to return when Kol, Vincent and Davina had severed the link to the Ancestral Plane, resurrects Davina in order to force Kol into doing her bidding, linking herself to Davina so that any harm that befalls the Hollow will befall Davina as well. Kol reluctantly does the Hollow's bidding, betraying his family and protecting a magical totem that increases the Hollow's power and influence. In order to save Davina, Kol enlists his niece Hope's help to use one of Esther's spells to break the link, earning him Klaus' ire in the process. By invoking Klaus' love for Cami, Kol is able to get his brother to relent in harming him. Hope succeeds in breaking the link just in time and Kol departs New Orleans with Davina to find a new life. He later reluctantly returns to take a piece of the Hollow's soul into himself in order to contain the evil spirit, although it means that Kol will have to remain separated from his family for all time. After the ritual, Kol buys an engagement ring for Davina.

In season five, seven years later, Kol is happily married to Davina and keeps in touch with his niece over the phone. However, the threat of vampire extremists brings the Mikaelsons back together, causing Hope to draw the Hollow from her family into herself. Kol and Davina later attend Freya and Keelin's wedding with Kol acting as their officiant, having been ordained as a monk in the 13th century as well as by the Internet hours before the wedding just to be safe. In the series finale, Kol is the one Mikaelson sibling who refuses to remain as Klaus prepares to sacrifice himself to destroy the Hollow for good, angered by Klaus' unilateral decision and evil actions towards his siblings over the centuries. However, Rebekah convinces Kol to return to say goodbye to their brother as he prepares to make the ultimate sacrifice with Elijah deciding to join him, leaving Kol and Rebekah as the only surviving Original Vampires.

==== In Legacies ====
Kol joins Marcel, Rebekah and Freya in bring Hope's humanity back. They hold a memorial dinner for Klaus and decide on sending Hope his ashes, with the promise to visit more.

=== Sabine Laurent ===
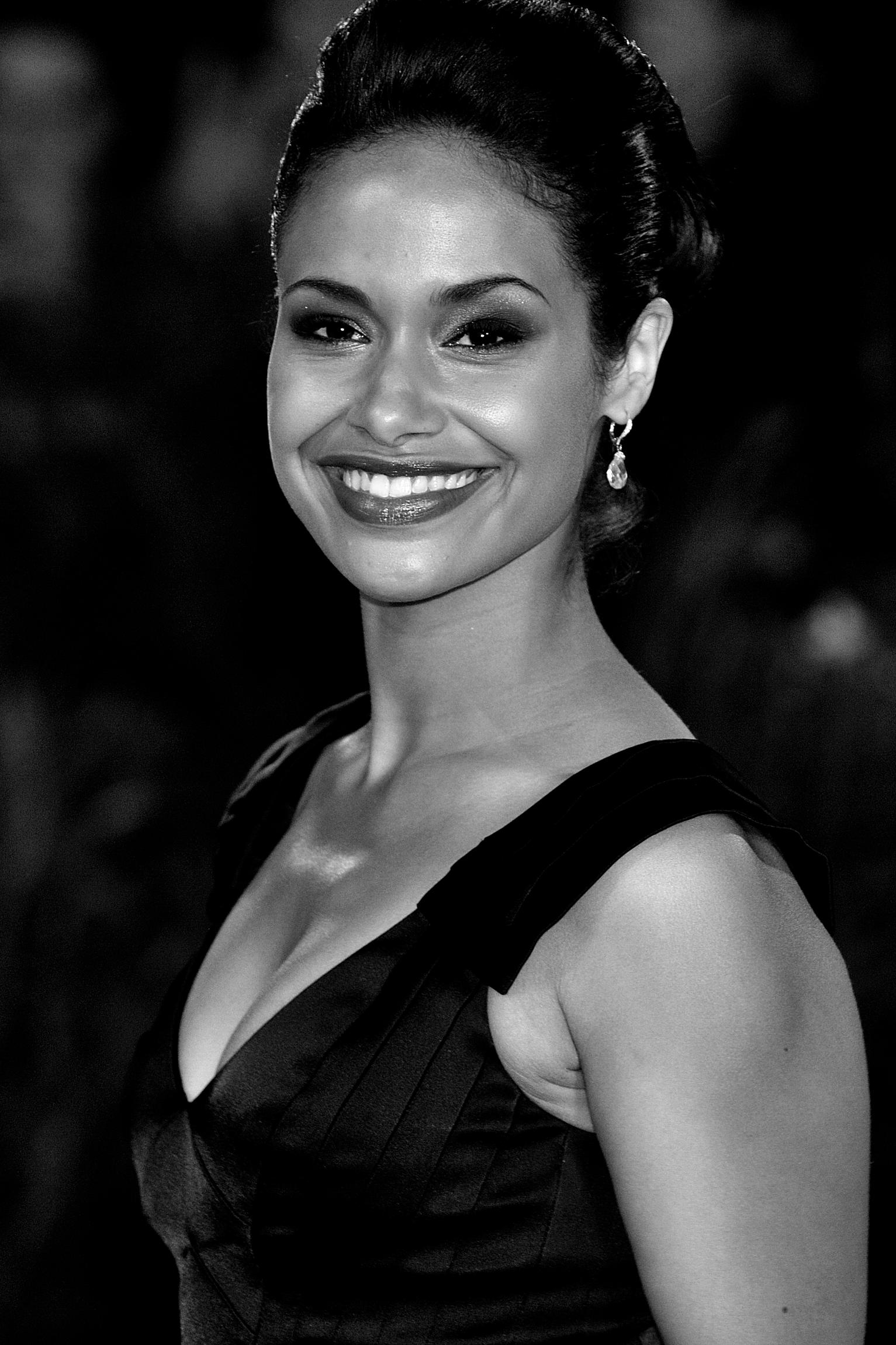
Shannon Kane

- Played by Shannon Kane
- Season: 1

Sabine Laurent is a witch who is possessed by Celeste DuBois. Celeste and Elijah were in love in the 1800s until 1820 when Klaus sent rumors that the bodies were a result of the witches seeking blood sacrifice for their rituals. She has been holding a grudge and plotting her revenge for 2 centuries. She was the reason why the harvest girls didn't resurrect when they were supposed to. Sabine had the ability to jump into different bodies whenever she died and that's why she has been alive all this time.

=== Diego ===
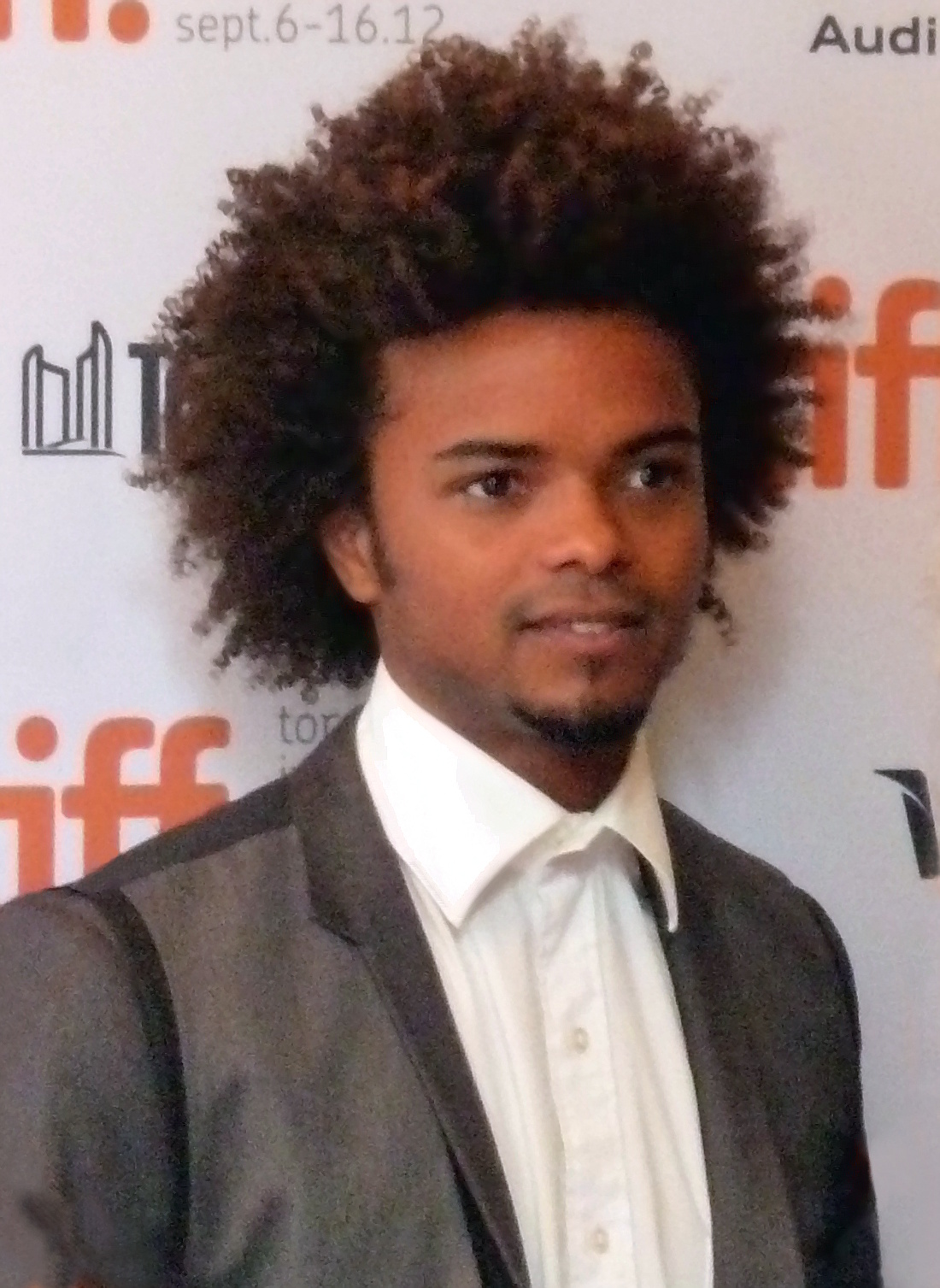
Eka Darville

- Played by Eka Darville
- TVD guest starring season: 4
- TO recurring season: 1

Diego was once a human, who was then turned into a vampire, likely sired by Marcel Gerard. He is one of Marcel's guards and is a member of Marcel's inner circle, who gain daylight rings upon entry. He's loyal to Marcel and his friends; one of his close friends is Thierry Vanchure. Just like Thierry, Diego does not like, nor trust the Originals.

In The Originals, Diego seemed to be one of Marcel's closer advocates as Marcel came to his rescue when Klaus lashed out. He stated that he only answers to Marcel, and his loyalty to Marcel is so strong that he dared to talk back to Klaus of all people when he came to him seeking Marcel's whereabouts. Diego was choked by Klaus as a result of such disrespect toward him. Marcel stepped in to break up the fight, but Diego responded in a tone that shows his full loyalty to Klaus' former protege.

At the end of season one, Diego and the other Vampires are attacked by a group of werewolves using mystic stones to access their full power and while fleeing, he is ambushed and bitten. While Diego and the others lay dying in the courtyard, Mikael comes and drains the vampires of all their blood, allowing the werewolf venom to finish them off quicker.

=== Thierry Vanchure ===
- Played by Callard Harris
- TVD guest starring season: 4
- TO recurring season: 1

Thierry Vanchure was once a human living in the 1940s. Marcel found Thierry Vanchure during World War II. Thierry was dying of a war wound outside a VA hospital. Marcel turned him soon after. He has been loyal to Marcel ever since and became his closest friend and his right-hand man. When Marcel told Klaus that he was now king of New Orleans and that Klaus was nothing anymore, Klaus responded by biting Thierry and infecting him with a hybrid bite, as a show of power. Later, in line with Sophie's plan to overthrow Marcel, Klaus healed Thierry to try to gain Marcel's trust. He is later killed by Elijah via his heart being ripped out as a warning to Marcel.

=== Mikael Mikaelson ===
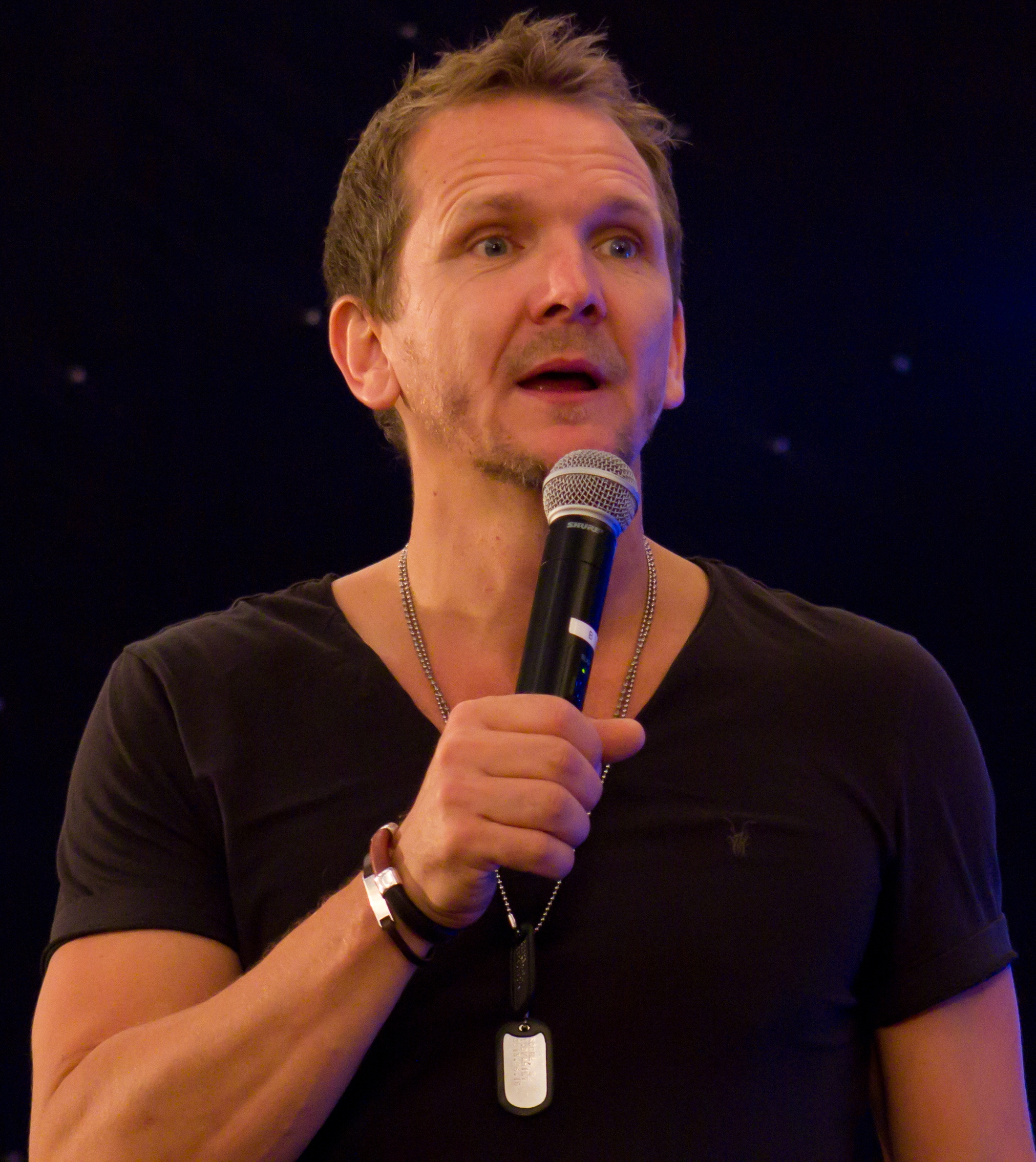
Sebastian Roché

- Played by Sebastian Roché
- TVD recurring season: 3
- TO recurring seasons: 1–2
- TO guest starring season: 4
- Also played by Isaiah Stratton (young Mikael) in season 2

Mikael is the vampire who hunts vampires in season three of The Vampire Diaries. He feeds on vampires to avoid harming innocent people as he never intended the blood-lust of vampirism to happen.

==== In The Vampire Diaries ====
Mikael is hunting Klaus for killing his wife and framing him for it, It is later revealed that he is the father of the Original Vampires and Klaus' abusive stepfather. Mikael finally gets the chance to kill Klaus with the help of Damon, but Stefan interferes and saves Klaus, allowing the latter to kill Mikael with his own weapon, a white-oak stake. He usually appears in flashbacks of The Originals, and during the episode "A Closer Walk with Thee", Mikael appears in the dreams of Klaus, Elijah, and Hayley to haunt them, during the disintegration of The Other Side during The Vampire Diaries (season 5). At the end of the episode, Mikael tells Davina that she can bring him back from the dead to kill Klaus. His full name is Mikeal John Mikealson.

==== In The Originals ====
In the last episode of season one, Davina brings Mikael back to life. He goes to the courtyard and feeds on all the vampires that have been bitten by werewolves. When he is about to go into the nursery and kill Klaus and baby Hope, Davina comes in and stops him. Dragging him back to the attic in the church and tells him that when she brought him back, she mystically tethered him to a bracelet that allows her to control him, and locks him in the attic. In season two, Mikael is eager to kill Klaus and tries many times to get off Davina's control. He saves her, Elijah, and Kaleb/Kol from the werewolves and almost kills Elijah when Davina's bracelet gets off her wrist. But she gets it back in time and ties it with a spell. When they hide in the cabin, Mikael begins to teach them how to be stronger the way he taught his sons and hurts her. When Klaus finds them, he forces Kol to unleash him from Davina and fight with Klaus only to get stabbed with Papa Tunde's knife. He manages to get it out from him and takes Cami hostage to lure Klaus. Even if he promised not to do so, he feeds on Cami to get his strength back after being stabbed. They meet each other with Klaus in a warehouse and Mikael finally manages to stab him with the white oak stake. Seeing Klaus doesn't burn, he understands Davina is putting a spell on it and he goes after her and stops the spell only after Cami gets the stake out of Klaus' chest. Returning to fight Klaus, he gets outnumbered by Klaus, Cami, Davina, Kaleb and Marcel, and Hayley who just arrived, and has to flee unable to face them all. In The Map Of Moments, Mikael is seen feeding on werewolves and Esther offers him a pact, to be on her side and she will let him kill Klaus. Klaus later kills Mikael again in order to get his ashes to kill Dahlia.

=== Kieran O'Connell ===
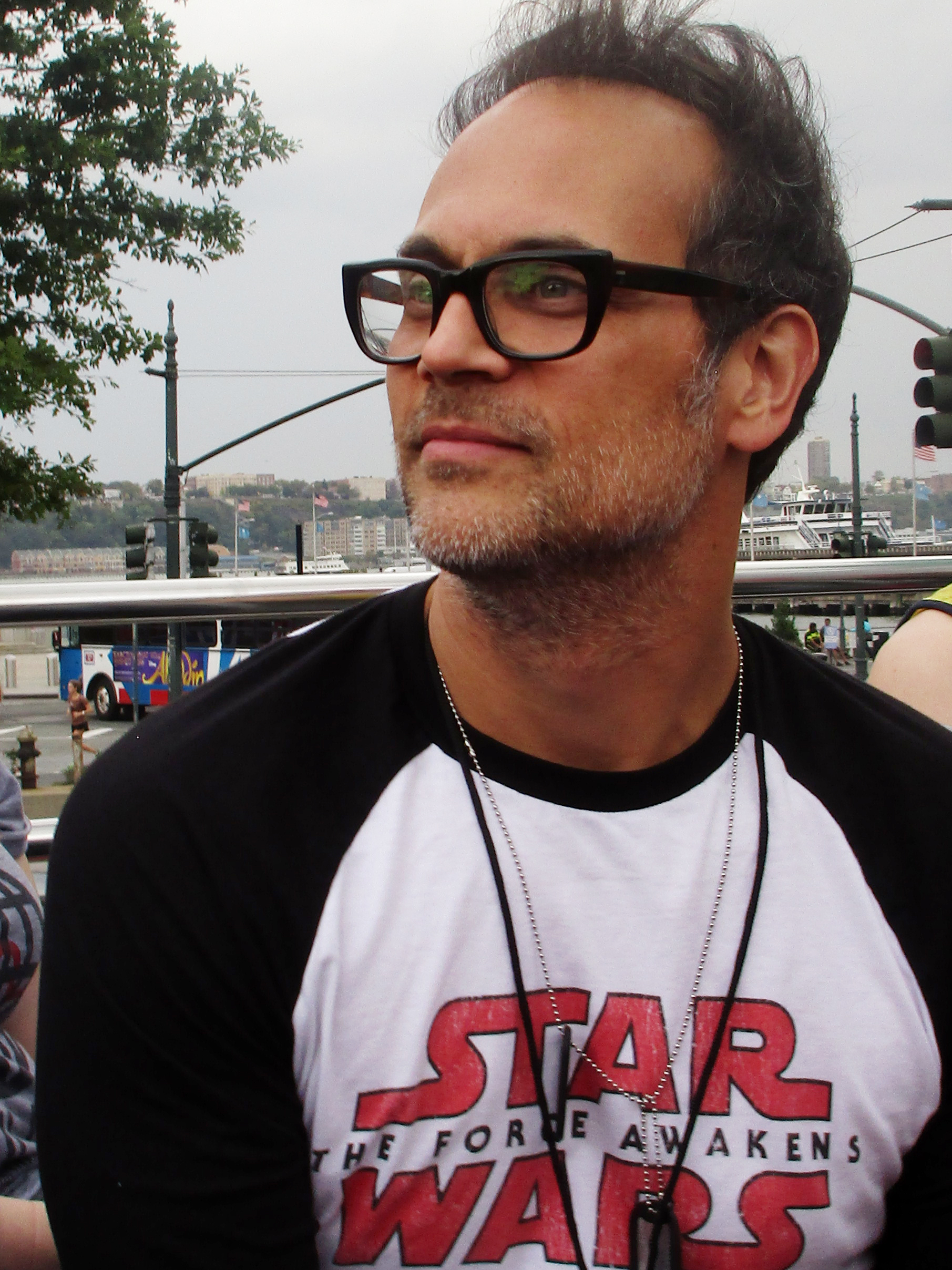
Todd Stashwick

- Played by Todd Stashwick
- Recurring season: 1

Father Kieran O'Connell is Cami's uncle, Priest of the local Church, St. Anne's Parish, and the representative of the Human Faction in New Orleans. He is respected by Klaus for showing no fear of him and even standing up to him. After being hexed by the witches, and slowly going crazy, he is turned into a vampire by Klaus at the will of Cami, hoping it will break the hex, at first it seems to be successful though Kieran now wishes to die rather than transition into a vampire, unfortunately, the hex comes back along with the full negative effects. Now insane, Kieran is driven by visions of Bastianna (the witch who hexed him) to kill Cami and nearly succeeds in doing so, during this, he also transitions into a vampire by licking Cami's blood off a knife. Klaus saves Cami and breaks Kieran's neck, knocking him out. Klaus then kills Father Kieran as a mercy kill.

=== Genevieve ===
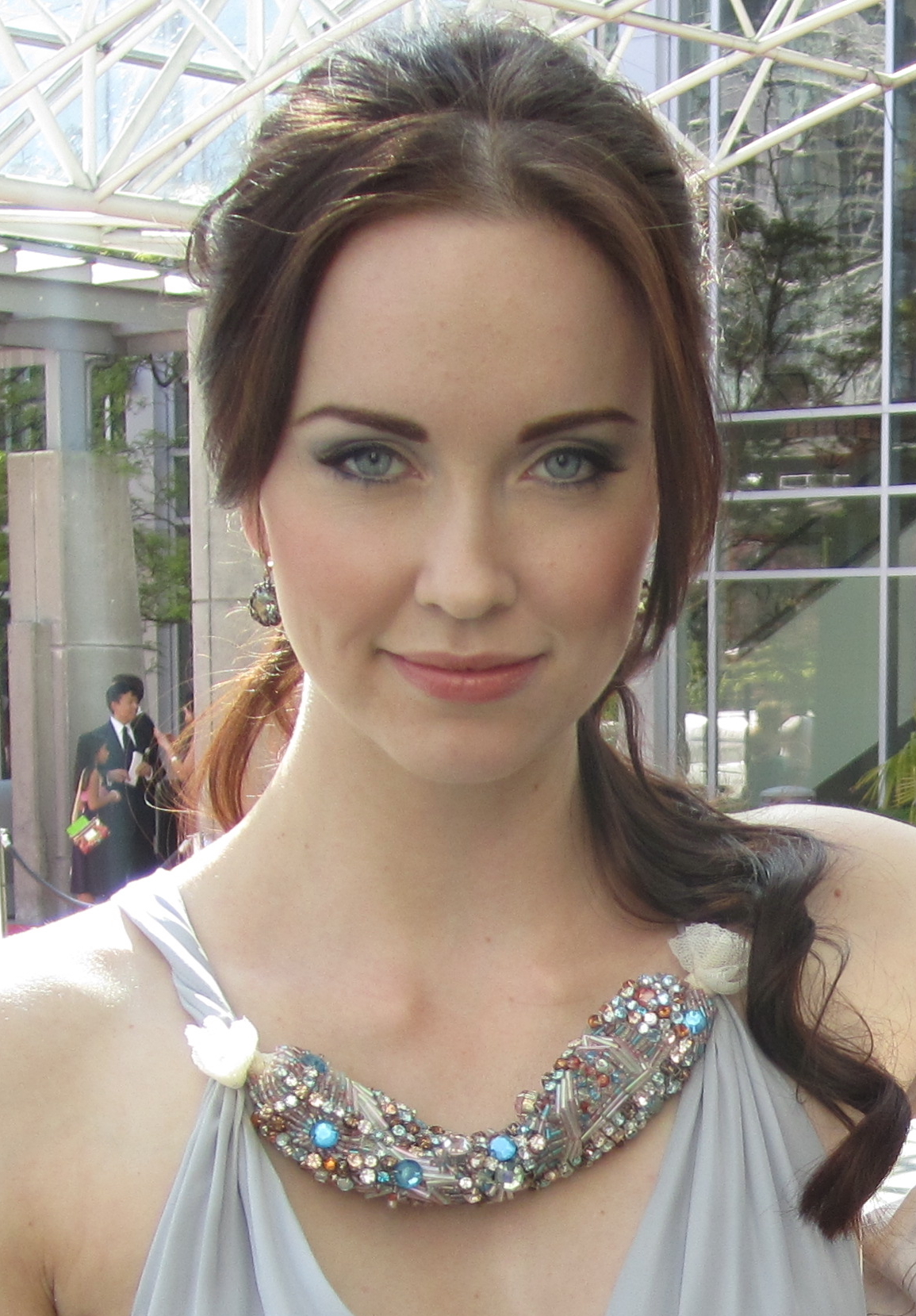
Elyse Levesque

- Played by Elyse Levesque
- Recurring season: 1

Genevieve is a witch who was brought back to life by Celeste DuBois during the harvest. Genevieve is a minor antagonist.

=== Francesca Correa ===
- Played by Peta Sergeant
- Recurring season: 1
- Guest starring season: 2

Francesca Correa is a philanthropist, the matriarch of a sizable drug trafficking empire throughout New Orleans, and an alpha of the Guerrera pack.

=== Cassie ===
- Played by Natalie Dreyfuss
- Guest starring season: 1
- Recurring season: 2

Cassie is a witch. She is brought back to life when Genevieve is killed, but Esther possessed her body until she found a new host.

=== Kaleb Westphall ===
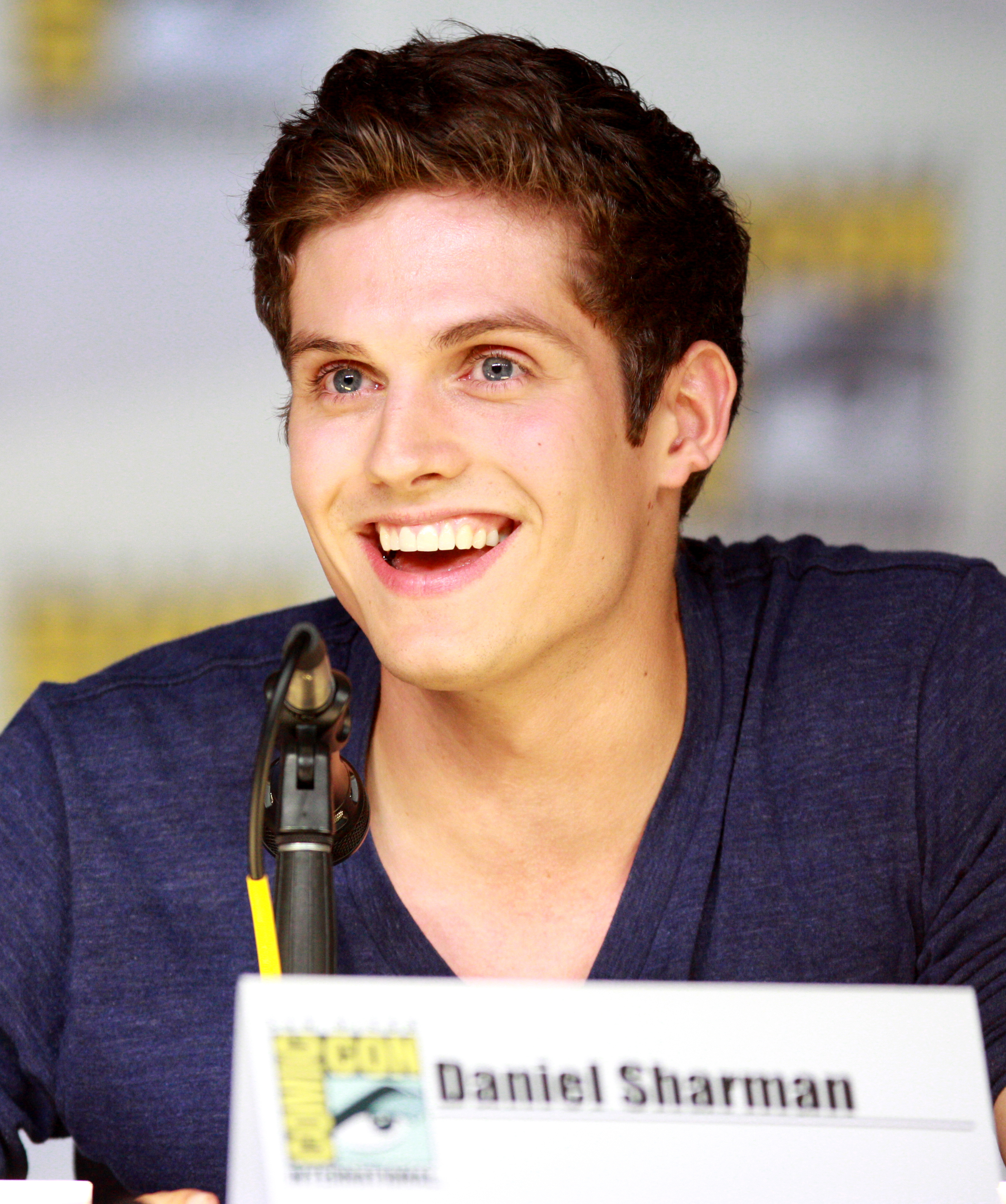
Daniel Sharman

- Played by Daniel Sharman
- Recurring season: 2

Kaleb is a witch who is possessed by Kol Mikaelson.

=== Gia ===
- Played by Nishi Munshi
- Recurring season: 2

Gia is a beautiful, soulful, edgy, rocker-girl vampire who left home at an early age due to her rocky upbringing and who became involved in New Orleans music scene. She is a love interest of Elijah.

=== Esther ===
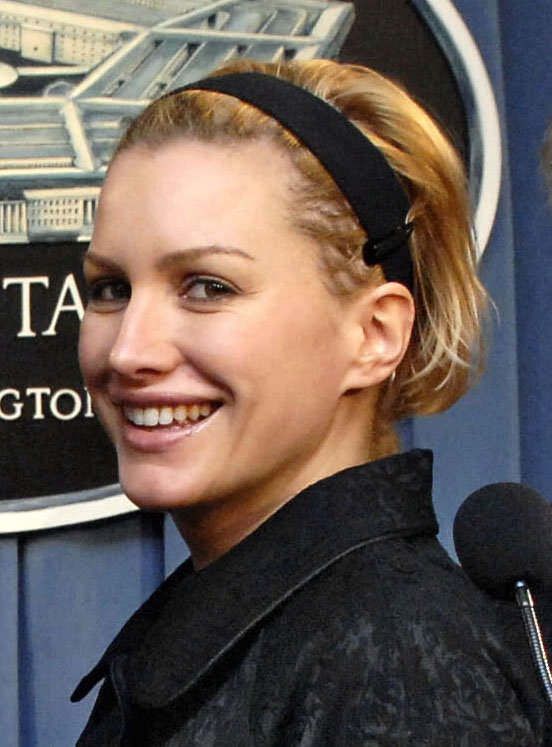
Alice Evans

- Played by Alice Evans
- TVD recurring season: 3
- TO recurring season: 2
- Also played by Hayley McCarthy (young Esther) in season 2

Esther is known as the Original Witch and is the mother of the Mikaelsons. The witch turned her five children into the first generation of vampires on Earth.

==== In The Vampire Diaries ====
She was killed by Klaus, but when she is awakened by Bonnie and her mother, she comes up with a plan to kill her children. She is again killed by Alaric after turning him into a vampire to kill the Originals.

==== In The Originals ====
In the season one finale of The Originals, she gets back from the dead in the body of one of the harvest girls, Cassie. She brings back with her Kol and Finn.

In season two, she wants to purify her sons by offering them to switch bodies and become humans again. She starts to get the werewolves to her side by creating moonstone rings for them. She then reveals herself to Klaus and Elijah and jumps into the body of another witch, Lenore. When Elijah and Oliver save the werewolves from being enrolled in the wolves' army, she comes with Finn at the end of the fight, takes Elijah hostage, and puts a spell on Oliver, which makes him die a few days later. She tries to convince Elijah to give up his vampire condition by making him relive his past in his dreams and see what horrible things he has done. In a flashback, we see that she had to give up her first child (a girl named Freya, Finn's twin sister) to her sister Dahlia because of a pact she made with her in order to have kids. Every first-born child of their bloodline must be given up or Dahlia will come back to kill them all.

In Chasing The Devil's Tail, Esther asks Finn to bring her Cami and as he doesn't show up, she goes to Cami and puts a spell on her in order to welcome Rebekah into Cami's body. She reunites with Kol and Rebekah when he brings her the white oak stake and she comes to accept her offer for a new life. Just as she begins her spell, Rebekah finds out Esther hasn't been telling all the truth and has other plans for her children. She wants to put them in some human bodies and destroy their vampire ones with the white oak stake. Kol and Rebekah who didn't know about that try to convince her to stop the spell, but it's already done. After a final confrontation with Klaus, she prepares to jump into another body but is stopped by Davina's spell and is killed by Klaus. Esther later wakes up and realizes she died with Rebekah's blood in her system, and as Klaus explains it to her she will no longer be a witch and have to choose between being a vampire and hating herself or letting herself die. Klaus walks out as she starts crying. She is later executed by Freya for giving her over to Dahlia.

In Ashes to Ashes, Esther is resurrected in her original witch body by Davina Claire who thought she was bringing back her boyfriend Kol. Esther is forced to help her children in their plan to destroy Dahlia once and for as she is the person Dahlia loves most and thus the key to stopping her sister once and for all. Esther ultimately chooses to sacrifice herself to stop Dahlia, allowing Klaus to kill them both. Reunited in the afterlife, Esther and Dahlia finally find peace together.

=== Lenore Shaw ===
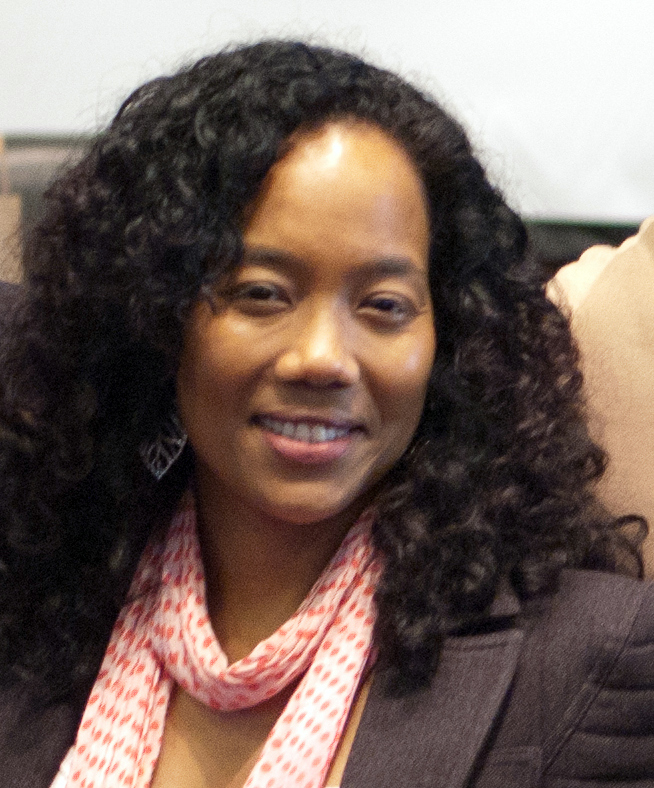
Sonja Sohn

- Played by Sonja Sohn
- Recurring season: 2

Lenore Shaw is a witch who is possessed by Esther. Her body is later destroyed by Freya, who transmuted it into starlings in order to kill her mother.

=== Finn Mikaelson ===
- Played by Casper Zafer
- TVD recurring season: 3
- TO recurring season: 3
- Also played by Cade Weeks (child Finn) and Voltaire Colin Council (teen Finn) in season 2

Finn Mikaelson is an original vampire and the older brother of Klaus.

==== In The Vampire Diaries ====
Finn is undaggered by Elijah and joins forces with his resurrected mother Esther to destroy his siblings. Esther links the siblings together and then performs a spell to remove Finn's immortality which would make all of the Originals humans at which point Esther would kill Finn and all of her children with him. However, this plot is foiled when Damon Salvatore turns Abby Bennett into a vampire, severing Esther from her source of power, the entire Bennett Coven. With Finn still magically linked to his siblings, the Mystic Falls gang ambushes him using newly created White Oak stakes, intending to kill Finn and all of the Originals with him. Matt Donovon succeeds in killing Finn, but not before Klaus forces Bonnie Bennett to break the magical link between Finn and his siblings, preventing the others from dying along with him. Finn's former lover Sage, enraged by his murder, attacks the Salvatores in revenge an hour later, only to suddenly die along with her henchman Troy. With Finn having turned Sage and Sage having turned Troy in turn, it's realized that the death of an Original Vampire also kills off their entire sireline.

==== In The Originals ====
Finn is resurrected by possessing a witch with his mother in The Originals season one finale. In season two Finn becomes a powerful opponent of Klaus and Elijah, helping his mother with her plans. He's got his magic back and doesn't fear to use it even on his brothers. He is in the body of a man named Vincent and meets Cami by becoming her study counselor. They often see each other and Finn begins to get attached. When Cami is attacked and kidnapped by a werewolf, he tracks her down and goes to the church where Aiden, Josh, and Hayley wait for him. Finn is wounded by Jackson's arrows and Cami, who was part of the plan to kidnap him, handcuffs him with some dark magic objects. Brought back to Klaus and Elijah, Finn refuses to turn his back on their mother and after telling the true story about Freya disappearing, he is locked down in a coffin by Marcel and Klaus. Cami takes him out to question him and ask for his help but he refuses. Later, Marcel finds out someone (possibly Mikael) has freed him. Finn is eventually removed from Vincent's body and held instead in Freya's pendant, occasionally lending his sister his power for spells.

In season three, Finn is resurrected in his original form as an Original Vampire, apparently as a side effect of Davina's spell to resurrect Kol who was bound to the Mikaelson family. Dissatisfied with being a vampire again, Finn seeks to have his spirit implanted into a witch's body again, but a vengeful Davina magically binds Finn to his body in retaliation for his murder of Kol while they were both still witches. Finn also reveals to Elijah that much of his anger at his siblings comes from being daggered for over 900 years by Klaus. Unbeknownst to his family, Finn's consciousness had slowly been returning, leaving him trapped in a hellish state from which he couldn't escape, unlike the others who had remained unconscious the entire time. After Lucien Castle kidnaps Freya, Finn joins Elijah in going back to Mystic Falls to rescue their sister where he is reunited with Matt Donovon, the man who had killed Finn in the first place. Finn, Elijah, and Matt confront Lucien, ending in Finn and Matt killing Lucien together using wooden bullets from Matt's gun. However, this just triggers Lucien's transformation into an even more powerful kind of Original Vampire and he bites Finn, injecting him with a powerful form of werewolf venom that not even Klaus' blood can cure. With Davina's spell keeping Freya from transferring Finn's spirit back into her pendant, he dies surrounded by his family, happy to finally have the acceptance that he had always sought from them. The Mikaelsons later spread Finn's ashes over the city.

=== Lucien Castle ===
- Played by Andrew Lees
- TO recurring season: 3

Lucien is the first vampire Klaus turned, albeit by accident and the first vampire to ever be sired. In 1002, he was a servant for the De Martel family and in love with the daughter Aurora. However, Lucien was constantly tormented by Aurora's sadistic brother Tristan. After discovering Klaus' true nature, Lucien got into a brief fight with Klaus, causing him to get cut with a knife that had Klaus' blood on it. After Lucien attacked Tristan, he was killed by a guard and later revived as the first sired vampire.

In season three, Lucien arrives in New Orleans and presents himself as an ally to Klaus in the brewing war between the surviving sirelines. He also receives a prophecy about a Beast that will come and destroy the Mikaelson family. In secret, Lucien performs experiments upon vampires and werewolves in order to turn himself into an even more powerful version of an Original Vampire. With the reluctant help of the witch Vincent, Lucien successfully creates two doses of an elixir just before being confronted by Elijah, Matt Donovan, and a resurrected Finn. Despite Lucien using Freya as a hostage, he is killed by Finn and Matt using wooden bullets, but this just triggers his transformation. Lucien kills Finn and goes to war with the Mikaelsons', proving to have a venomous bite that not even Klaus' Hybrid blood can cure. Lucien kills Klaus' girlfriend Camile before Freya manages to reverse the spell that had given Lucien his extra powers. Reverted back into an ordinary vampire, Lucien is killed for good by Klaus who rips out his heart. However, Marcel Gerard consumes the second dose of Lucien's elixir and becomes the Beast of the prophecy.

=== Aurora de Martel ===
- Played by Rebecca Breeds
- The Originals recurring season 3
- Legacies recurring season 4

Aurora de Martel is an ancient vampire who was turned by Rebekah Mikaelson and is one of the first vampires to ever be sired.

In 1002 France, Aurora is a noblewoman in the family whom the Mikalesons take refuge with. Both Klaus and Lucien Castle are taken with her and Aurora and Klaus bond over their respective guilt regarding the deaths of their mothers. However, their affair is discovered by a jealous Lucien and Klaus flees while Aurora is discovered with Lucien by her sadistic brother Tristan. Believing that Lucien was having an affair with his sister, Tristan takes him to be tortured, only for Lucien, after being healed by Klaus' blood, to attack Tristan in revenge before being killed by a guard. However, Lucien transitions into the first ever sired vampire, and a horrified Aurora witnesses him and Klaus feeding on innocent women. Aurora attempts to commit suicide, but she is saved by Rebekah who heals Aurora with her blood. Aurora successfully attempts suicide a second time and becomes the first sired vampire of Rebekah's bloodline, continuing her relationship with Klaus until the Mikaelsons are forced to flee. Elijah compels Aurora to see his brother as a monster in order to end their relationship and then compels Lucien, Aurora, and Tristan, who is sired by Elijah to believe that they are Klaus, Rebekah, and Elijah, effectively taking their place until Elijah is briefly daggered by the Brotherhood of the Five which frees them.

==== In The Originals ====
In season three, following the deaths of Finn and Kol and their entire bloodlines, the bloodlines of Klaus, Elijah and Rebekah go to war. Aurora joins her brother in traveling to New Orleans where they plot with Lucien and the Strix to permanently imprison the Originals so as to protect themselves from being wiped out by their deaths after escaping Tristan's attempt to imprison her in a monastery. Aurora is reunited with Klaus and reveals the truth about how Elijah had forced an end to their relationship in an effort to drive a rift between the brothers. Aurora and Klaus resume their relationship and she reveals her brother and Lucien's secret alliance and plans to Klaus. After discovering that the siblings had taken Rebekah and imprisoned her in the ocean, Klaus turns on Aurora, forcing her to reveal Rebekah's location, but not before she turns Klaus' girlfriend Cami in a jealous rage. Aurora is used as leverage against Tristan who is imprisoned at the bottom of the ocean by the Mikaelsons and she steals the last remaining piece of the White Oak Tree for a coven of witches called the Sisters. Aurora creates seven bullets out of the White Oak capable of killing the Originals, but she is imprisoned by Klaus behind a cemetery wall after an attempt to sever the bloodlines of Klaus and Elijah results in only Klaus' being severed. While Elijah is able to destroy six of the bullets that Aurora had created, she had secretly hidden one which is sought by the Mikaelsons' various enemies. She is later released by Lucien, but she is eventually captured and imprisoned for a second time.

==== In Legacies ====
In season four, Aurora, having been rescued by Triad Industries in the intervening years, attempts to destroy Hope Mikaelson in revenge for her father's actions, allying herself with Lizzie Saltzman after Hope becomes the tribrid and possessing Hope's body at one point. Following the destruction of Triad Industries and the end of her alliance with Lizzie, Aurora instead allies herself with the god Ken, but finds herself more and more conflicted over time, especially after Ken's daughter Jen reveals that he is only using her. When Hope challenges Ken to combat, he instead sends Aurora in his place, armed with a spear made out of god magic and ash from the Red Oak Tree. Hope defeats Aurora, but attempts to make peace with her instead of killing Aurora. During the fight between Ken and Hope, Aurora's loyalty to Ken finally breaks and she sacrifices herself to save Hope, moving in front of a fatal blow from Ken's spear meant for Hope. Mortally wounded beyond even Hope's ability to heal, Aurora tells Klaus' daughter that she had loved him and Hope had changed her father in ways that Aurora never could. Aurora and Hope make peace with each other before Aurora dies in Hope's arms. With her last words, Aurora urges Hope to never forget who she is and to do as much as she can with her life. Following Ken's death, Hope and Lizzie give Aurora a Viking funeral and express hope that she finds peace in the afterlife.

=== The Hollow ===
- Played by Blu Hunt
- TO recurring season: 4
- Also played by various cast members while possessing their characters' bodies

The Hollow, whose real name is Inadu, was born to a Native American tribe who bestowed upon her great power throughout her mother's pregnancy in the hopes of her becoming a symbol of prosperity. However, upon her birth, the Hollow only craved more and more power, frightening the tribe's elders. Eventually, the four elders each imbued a part of their power into an axe and had the Hollow's own mother kill her with it. In her last moments, the Hollow channeled the power of her own death and cursed the tribe to turn into the very creatures that they had used to hunt her down, wolves, thus creating the werewolf curse. Over the next centuries, the Hollow's spirit influenced people to acts of evil and targeted her own bloodline for destruction, leaving Hayley Marshall as the last survivor. She was locked away in another dimension until Davina Claire inadvertently let her out by severing the connection between the Ancestral Plane and Earth.

In season four, the Hollow begins plotting to rise more powerful than ever using various acolytes to do her bidding with Dominic revealing to the Mikaelsons that the Hollow is planning to resurrect herself for which she needs four pieces of her remains, only two of which have been found. The Hollow possesses Sofya while the Mikaelsons discover that the last of her remains were under the care of the Lockwood family in Mystic Falls. The Hollow kills Elijah Mikaelson with thorns created from Marcel Gerard's venom, although Marcel manages to exorcise her from Sofya by stabbing Sofya in the heart with a dagger coated in the blood of Hayley, the blood of the Hollow's own descendants being her only weakness. By channeling the power of Elijah's death and the death of his entire vampire bloodline, the Hollow successfully resurrects herself in physical form. The Hollow begins sacrificing her own followers for more power and resurrects Davina Claire, linking Davina to her in order to force Kol Mikaelson to do her bidding. However, Hope Mikaelson manages to break the linking spell and Hayley kills the Hollow using a knife anointed with Hope's blood, Hope to be the Hollow's only living descendant as Hayley is undead. By channeling the power of the Hollow's death, Freya is able to resurrect Elijah using the same spell that the Hollow had used to resurrect herself. However, before her death, the Hollow casts a spell that allows her spirit to possess Hope's body. In desperation to stop her and save Hope, the Mikaelsons, Vincent and Marcel draw her spirit out of Hope's body and split it into four pieces with Klaus, Rebekah, Elijah and Kol each taking one. The Mikaelsons then split up across the Earth in an effort to keep the Hollow from ever again reforming.

In season five, five years later, the Hollow's spirit remains split up between the Originals, forcing them to remain separated and having negative side effects whenever any of them gets too close to each other. However, in order to save her family, Hope draws the Hollow back inside of herself and begins falling under the Hollow's negative influence more and more, causing Hope to become darker and darker. By tapping into the Hollow's power to kill a large group of attacking vampires, Hope manages to regain some control over herself, but she remains darkly affected by the spirit's presence. Realizing that the Hollow needs to be destroyed for good, Klaus enlists the help of Josie and Lizzie Saltzman to siphon the evil spirit out of Hope and into his own body, planning to then kill himself, sacrificing himself to destroy the Hollow for good. Although Klaus is successful in drawing the Hollow into himself, he is stopped from committing suicide by Elijah who temporarily draws part of the Hollow into himself in order to give Klaus more hours of sanity to properly say goodbye to his loved ones. Using a White Oak stake, Klaus and Elijah, who decides to die with his brother, mutually kill each other. The Hollow's spirit is destroyed by Klaus' death, bringing a final end to her evil.

She's briefly mentioned in Legacies where Hope says that the Hollow is now considered to be ancient history.

== Minor characters ==
The following is a list of named characters who have had a story arc in the series that lasted two episodes or more.

=== Season one ===
- Malaya Rivera Drew as Jane-Anne Deveraux, Sophie's sister and a witch.
- Karen Kaia Livers as Agnes, an elder witch, and a minor antagonist.
- Alexandra Metz as Katie, Thierry's girlfriend who is a French Quarter Witch.
- Raney Branch as Celeste DuBois, a witch and one of two of Elijah's greatest loves. She possesses Sabine Laurent's body.
- Shane Coffey as Timothy, Davina's boyfriend, and a violinist. He poisons himself and Davina under compulsion from Klaus in an attempt to kill the witch. Although Davina ultimately survives, Timothy does not.
- Matt Kabus as Sean O'Connell, Camille's brother who died by suicide after falling under the influence of an insanity hex.
- Shannon Eubanks as Bastianna Natale, an elder witch, and a minor antagonist. She is also known for starting the Harvest ritual which drove the plot of the Harvest girls.
- Yasmine Al-Bustami as Monique Deveraux, a witch, former friend of Davina and a minor antagonist.
- Tasha Ames as Eve, a werewolf of the Crescent pack.
- Jesse C. Boyd as Cary, a werewolf who descends from Ansel.
- Owiso Odera as Papa Tunde, a powerful witch, and a minor antagonist. He is known for practicing sacrificial magic and responsible for building his own weapon which is the Tunde blade.
- Aubrey DeVaney and Alexa Yeames as Abigail, a witch, and a minor antagonist.

=== Season two ===
- Yohance Myles as Joe Dalton, a vampire who owns a music store.
- Lloyd Owen as Ansel, Klaus's father and a werewolf who was resurrected by Esther before the collapse of the Other Side. He is killed again by Klaus in order to protect his daughter.
- Maisie Richardson-Sellers as Eva Sinclair, Vincent's wife, who sacrificed children for more power; later she that was used in a spell, and had Rebekah's spirit inside her; Eva also rose back to power in her body and began to sacrifice children for the second time, and was then banished.

=== Season three ===
- Stephanie Cleough as Alexis, a witch, and Lucien's ally.
- Joyce Thi Brew as Kara Ngyuen, an elder witch.
- Lawrence Kao as Van Nguyen, a witch, and Kara's son.
- Taylor Cole as Sofya Voronova, a 500-year-old vampire working for Lucien. After his death, she stays in New Orleans working for Marcel and becomes his lover. She hates the Mikaelsons because Klaus murdered her family. She is possessed by the Hollow for a time and helps defeat her, after which she leaves town.

=== Season four ===
- Alkoya Brunson as Adam Folsom, Maxine's son, and a witch.
- Karan Kendrick as Maxine Folsom, Adam's mother, and a witch.
- Madelyn Cline as Jessica, a witch, and a harvest girl.
- Najah Jackson as Amy, a witch, and a harvest girl.

=== Season five ===
- Nicholas Alexander as Henry Benoit, a werewolf who is turned into a hybrid by Hope. After losing control of his anger and killing a vampire, he is killed by an unknown attacker and his body is displayed.
- Robert Baker as Emmett, a member of Greta Sienna's group of vampires. He acts as her second in command and takes over after Hayley sacrifices herself to kill Greta. While attacking a massive group of followers, he is killed with a spell by Hope Mikaelson channeling the power of the Hollow alongside all of his vampire followers.

== Guest characters ==
The following is a list of named characters who appeared in only one episode.

=== Season one ===
- Devon Allowitz as Henrik Mikaelson
- Johnny Walter as Dwayne
- Morgan Alexandria as Lana

=== Season two ===
- Keri Lynn Pratt as Mary-Alice Claire
- Aleeah Rogers as Astrid Malchance
- Adam Fristoe as Ruben Morris
- Nate Lycan as Mathias
- Nina Repeta as Melinda

=== Season three ===
- Jaylen Moore as Mohinder
- Antwan Mills as Anton
- Rebecca Blumhagen as Madison
- Leslie-Anne Huff as Rayna Cruz
- Matt Cedeño as Gaspar Cortez
- Dan Martin as Hollis

=== Season four ===
- Neil Jackson as Alistair Duquesne
- Keahu Kahuanui as Eddie, a human and Josh's boyfriend.
- Lyndon Smith as Lara
- Alan Heckner as Richard Xavier Dumas
- Ahmed Lucan as Nathaniel
- Chase Vasser as Laurent

=== Season five ===
- Demetrius Bridges as Dorian Williams
- Katie Jane Cook as Poppy
- Rick Espaillat as Pierre
- Malone Thomas as Colette
- Jason Burkey as David
- Jamie Thomas King as August Müller
- Ian Pala as Max
- Jimmy Ray Pickens as Bill
- Allison Gobuzzi as Elizabeth "Lizzie" Saltzman
- Bella Samman as Josette "Josie" Saltzman
- Aria Shahghasemi as Landon Kirby
- Sam Ashby as Connor

== Special guest stars ==
During the show, some special guest stars from the original "The Vampire Diaries" TV series appeared:

- S3, E14 (A Streetcar Named Desire):
  Paul Wesley as Stefan Salvatore
- S2, E5 (Red Door):
  Nina Dobrev as Tatia
- S1, E7 (Bloodletting); S1, E8 (The River in Reverse):
  Michael Trevino as Tyler Lockwood
- S4, E8 (Voodoo in My Blood); S4, E13 (The Feast of All Sinners); S5, E12 (The Tale of Two Wolves):
  Matt Davis as Alaric Saltzman
- S5, E1 (Where You Left Your Heart); S5, E6 (What, Will, I, Have, Left); S5, E7 (God's Gonna Trouble the Water); S5, E12 (The Tale of Two Wolves); S5, E13 (When the Saints Go Marching In):
  Candice King as Caroline Forbes
- S3, E17 (Behind the Black Horizon):
  Zach Roerig as Matt Donovan
