= Michael Klesic =

American actor (born 1975)

- Born: July 31, 1975 (age 50); Tarzana, California
- Education: Guildford School of Acting

Michael Vladimir Klesic (born July 31, 1975) is an American actor.

== Early life ==
Klesic was born in Tarzana, California. He was raised mostly in Los Angeles and attended Beverly Hills High School in Beverly Hills, California. He graduated from the Guildford School of Acting in England.

== Career ==
His first roles came to him when he was just 18 playing bit parts in Clueless, Dangerous Minds, and a football player in Forrest Gump. In 1988, Klesic was cast as Henry Evans in The Good Son. The film was shelved due to lack of funding and Macaulay Culkin was cast in the part in the 1993 film.

He then retired from acting to work behind the scenes on a number of films and TV shows. After graduating from the Guildford School of Acting in 2003, he acted in A Wonderful Night in Split, which was directed by Arsen Anton Ostojić. He went on to work on Children of Men with Alfonso Cuaron and was cast as a people smuggler in Murphy's Law.

== Filmography ==
=== Film ===
Year	Title	Role	Notes
1995	Clueless	Baggy Skater	Uncredited
1996	Multiplicity	Carpenter	Uncredited
2004	A Wonderful Night in Split	Steve	
2005	Munich	Russian Athlete	Uncredited
2006	Screaming Blue Murder	Rocky Rock	
2006	Children of Men	Rado	
2006	Summer Love	Voice	Uncredited
2007	Outlanders	Mikhail	
2009	From Mexico with Love	The Accountant	
2020	Burning Dog	Igor	

=== Television ===
Year	Title	Role	Notes
1994	Weird Science	Buddy	Episode: "Killer Party"
1994	Models Inc.	Jack	Episode: "Bad Moon Rising"
1995	NYPD Blue	Greek Dancer	Episode: "A.D.A. Sipowicz"
2003	Days That Shook the World	Volney Wilson	Episode: "First Nuclear Reaction/Chernobyl"
2005	Have No Fear: The Life of Pope John Paul II	Stanislaw Starowleyski	Television film
2006	Seconds from Disaster	Cpt. Larry Wheaton	Episode: "Washington Air Crash"
2007	Rough Diamond	Reception Guard	Episode: "Old Gold"
2007	Murphy's Law	Milos	2 episodes
2008	Spooks	Andre Borodin	Episode #7.8
2009	Law & Order: UK	Jarek	Episode: "Buried"
2013	The Blacklist	Serbian Terrorist	Episode: "Pilot"
2013	Agents of S.H.I.E.L.D.	Kropsky	Episode: "Eye Spy"
2014	Intelligence	Bearded Ukrainian	Episode: "The Grey Hat"
2014	Shameless	Russian Priest	Episode: "Emily"
2014	Ray Donovan	Rough Guy #2	Episode: "Sunny"
2014	Scorpion	Igor	Episode: "Talismans"
2015	Fresh Off the Boat	Leather Daddy #4	Episode: "Blind Spot"
2016	Brooklyn Nine-Nine	Zerb Gudanya	Episode: "Terry Kitties"
2020	S.W.A.T.	Timur	Episode: "Stakeout"
2021	NCIS: Los Angeles	Igor Lebedev	Episode: "A Tale of Two Igors"
2026	For All Mankind	Oleg Vyshinsky	5 episodes
