= The Originals season 3 =

The Originals
- Season 3
- Promotional poster
- Showrunners: Julie Plec; Michael Narducci
- Starring: Joseph Morgan; Daniel Gillies; Phoebe Tonkin; Charles Michael Davis; Leah Pipes; Danielle Campbell; Yusuf Gatewood; Riley Voelkel
- No. of episodes: 22

Release
- Original network: The CW
- Original release: October 8, 2015 – May 20, 2016

Season chronology
- ← Previous; Season 2 Next → Season 4

The Originals, an American supernatural drama, was renewed for a third season by The CW on January 11, 2015. The season premiered on October 8, 2015.

== Cast ==
=== Main ===
- Joseph Morgan as Niklaus "Klaus" Mikaelson
- Daniel Gillies as Elijah Mikaelson
- Phoebe Tonkin as Hayley Marshall
- Charles Michael Davis as Marcellus "Marcel" Gerard
- Leah Pipes as Camille "Cami" O'Connell (Note: Pipes is credited as a series regular from episode 1 to 19. From episode 20 to 22, she is not credited and does not appear.)
- Danielle Campbell as Davina Claire (Note: Campbell is credited as a series regular from episode 1 to 21. In episode 22, she is not credited and does not appear.)
- Yusuf Gatewood as Vincent Griffith
- Riley Voelkel as Freya Mikaelson

=== Recurring ===
- Nathaniel Buzolic as Kol Mikaelson
- Andrew Lees as Lucien Castle
- Oliver Ackland as Tristan de Martel
- Rebecca Breeds as Aurora de Martel
- Caspar Zafer as Finn Mikaelson
- Jason Dohring as Detective Will Kinney
- Stephanie Cleough as Alexis
- Joyce Thi Brew as Kara Nguyen
- Nathan Parsons as Jackson Kenner
- Lawrence Kao as Van Nguyen
- Steven Krueger as Joshua "Josh" Rosza
- Tracy Ifeachor as Aya Al-Rashid
- Haley Ramm as Ariane

=== Special guest ===
- Claire Holt as Rebekah Mikaelson
- Paul Wesley as Stefan Salvatore
- Zach Roerig as Matt Donovan

=== Guest ===
- Jaylen Moore as Mohinder
- Maisie Richardson-Sellers as Eva Sinclair (possessed by Rebekah Mikaelson)
- Antwan Mills as Anton
- Debra Mooney as Mary Dumas
- Rebecca Blumhagen as Madison
- Leslie-Anne Huff as Rayna Cruz
- Matt Cedeño as Gaspar Cortez
- Taylor Cole as Sofya Voronova
- Dan Martin as Hollis

== Episodes ==
| No. overall | No. in season | Title | Directed by | Written by | Original release date | Prod. code | US viewers (millions) |
|---|---|---|---|---|---|---|---|
| 45 | 1 | "For the Next Millennium" | Lance Anderson | Michael Narducci | October 8, 2015 | 3J5601 | 0.89 |
Several months after their showdown with the powerful witch Dahlia, a rift continues to divide Klaus and Elijah. Freya raises Hope while searching for a way to return their family to the way they once were. Klaus is suspicious when an old vampire friend, Lucien, arrives in New Orleans with a mysterious agenda. Elijah questions whether he can forgive his brother for his offenses, while Hayley struggles with herself and her entire pack being cursed again. Vincent and Cami assist a detective after a series of murders are discovered, leading them to believe they may have a serial killer on the loose. Marcel, who has regained partial control of the Quarter, tries a new strategy to recruit vampires by renting out a fight club training center. While Davina is Regent of the New Orleans witch covens, she makes a decision that will put her and Marcel on opposing sides of an escalating conflict.
| 46 | 2 | "You Hung the Moon" | Jeffrey Hunt | Carina Adly Mackenzie | October 15, 2015 | 3J5602 | 1.12 |
Elijah and Jackson grow concerned for Hayley's safety when she fails to show up during the monthly full moon after Elijah discovers that human poachers are killing werewolves in the swamps. Meanwhile, Davina, the only one with the answer to Hayley's whereabouts, plots ways to use that to her advantage. Elsewhere, Cami approaches Klaus with her theory on who is behind the series of murders in the French Quarter, while Lucien delivers to Elijah an unsettling warning about the war brewing among the sire lines. After receiving a dire prophecy from Freya about the future of the Mikaelson siblings (that all three of them will die; one by friend, one by foe, and one by family), Klaus takes extreme measures to determine the validity of this potential impending threat.
| 47 | 3 | "I'll See You in Hell or New Orleans" | Michael Grossman | Declan de Barra & Michelle Paradise | October 22, 2015 | 3J5603 | 0.95 |
Elijah and Klaus discuss the history of Lucien, Aurora, and Tristan. They realize that Lucien could represent both "friend" and "foe" in the prophecy, so their future murderers remain unclear. The "family" segment of the prophecy has them concerned, so Elijah talks Klaus into paying Lucien a visit. Lucien compels Detective Kinney to let him talk to Cami, and Vincent insists on accompanying her. Lucien tells them his story. Marcel feels unappreciated. Cami is still in search of the killer. Tristan shows up at the latest murder scene with a smile on his face, and Aurora has killed all the monks at her retreat and is on her way to New Orleans.
| 48 | 4 | "A Walk on the Wild Side" | Matt Hastings | Ashley Lyle & Bart Nickerson | October 29, 2015 | 3J5604 | 1.07 |
In order to uncover what his old acquaintance, Tristan, is really doing in New Orleans, Elijah considers attending a formal gala thrown by a mysterious secret society made up of a group of ancient vampires known as The Strix, while Hayley invites herself to attend with him. Marcel is invited to the gala by Aya Al-Rashid, the emissary to the Strix with the opportunity to join the secret society.
| 49 | 5 | "The Axeman's Letter" | Michael Allowitz | Michael Russo & Diane Ademu-John | November 5, 2015 | 3J5605 | 0.97 |
Hayley and Jackson look after Davina at the Bayou after she made some enemies within her own coven. Meanwhile, Elijah asks Marcel with help to deal with Triston and his connection to the Strix. Elsewhere, Camille and Vincent keep an eye out for Lucien when things go awry. Klaus reunites with his old love, Aurora, and hears secrets he never would think of before now.
| 50 | 6 | "Beautiful Mistake" | Steven DePaul | Kyle Arrington & Christopher Hollier | November 12, 2015 | 3J5606 | 0.98 |
When Elijah and Freya discover that Rebekah may be the target of the Strix's latest plan, they do whatever it takes to protect her coffin's location. Meanwhile, Klaus spends time with Aurora to figure out where her loyalties lie, while a dangerous run-in with a member of The Strix leads Hayley and Marcel to make an unsettling discovery.
| 51 | 7 | "Out of the Easy" | Bethany Rooney | Beau DeMayo & Michelle Paradise | November 19, 2015 | 3J5607 | 0.80 |
Klaus and Elijah plan a Thanksgiving gathering at the compound in hopes of negotiating a truce between them and the Strix. Meanwhile, Vincent and Marcel realize Davina might be in over her head in dealing with her coven and decide to take matters into their own hands. Also, Camille encounters a new threat when she has a run-in with Aurora.
| 52 | 8 | "The Other Girl in New Orleans" | Kellie Cyrus | Michael Russo & Michael Narducci | December 3, 2015 | 3J5608 | 1.17 |
After learning that Camille's life is in danger and Aurora may be to blame for her abduction, Klaus is forced to engage in another one of Aurora's devious games and follow a series of clues she's left behind for him. Meanwhile, Elijah, Freya and Hayley take drastic measures against Tristan when they discover he holds a valuable piece of information they need. Elsewhere, Aya gives the double-dealing Marcel an ultimatum that leaves him with a difficult decision to make to where his loyalties lay; with the Mikaelsons or the Strix. Also, tensions between Hayley and Jackson cause her to reevaluate her involvement in Mikaelson family matters.
| 53 | 9 | "Savior" | Matt Hastings | Carina Adly MacKenzie & Diane Ademu-John | December 10, 2015 | 3J5609 | 0.97 |
When a dangerous affliction threatens to expose one of her siblings, Freya searches for a way to reverse the crippling curse, even after she finds herself the target of the Strix's latest plan. Meanwhile, Klaus keeps a watchful eye over Camille while she attempts to help Detective Kinney, whose life has begun to spiral out of control as a result of Lucien's compulsion towards him. Elsewhere, a confrontation with Marcel causes Vincent to reevaluate his decision to stay out of witch business. Also, Hayley's attempt at a quiet Christmas with Jackson and Hope results in a surprise as they spend the holiday with the entire family. Rebekah's mark comes back so she makes Elijah dagger her. Klaus confesses his feelings for Cami and they kiss. He later wakes up to find her throat slit.
| 54 | 10 | "A Ghost Along the Mississippi" | Michael Grossman | Declan de Barra | January 29, 2016 | 3J5610 | 0.95 |
With Camille now in transition to becoming a vampire due to Aurora's compulsion, Klaus declares war on his enemies. Meanwhile, Hayley and Jackson become Tristan's pawns to the Strix leading to an unpleasant confrontation with Elijah and Klaus and it results in the killing of someone close to them.
| 55 | 11 | "Wild at Heart" | John Hyams | Ashley Lyle & Bart Nickerson | February 5, 2016 | 3J5611 | 0.92 |
With the Strix leader, Tristan, locked away and Hayley's husband Jackson dead, the group searches for new leader by hiring a powerful witch, named Ariana, while Hayley deals with her depression and attends Jackson's funeral in the bayou. Klaus deals with the newly turned vampire Camille with her cravings for human blood. Meanwhile, Davina is alone and shunned by her coven as she focuses on bringing Kol Mikaelson back, but the magic she needs is dark which Josh offers to help her. Elsewhere, Elijah reluctantly aligns himself with Aya and Ariana after learning that they may have knowledge of an elusive weapon that could kill an Original vampire for good.
| 56 | 12 | "Dead Angels" | Darren Genet | Kyle Arrington & Michael Narducci | February 12, 2016 | 3J5612 | 0.80 |
Davina is recruited by Aya to help the Strix witches probe the dead Ariana's mind for information leading to the weapon to kill the original vampires. Meanwhile, Klaus ends up in a standoff with an unlikely foe when a white oak weapon that could destroy the Mikaelsons falls into Camille's hands which she and Vincent offer to bargain to use to their own advantage. Also, Elijah recalls his first meeting with Aya and all about the founding of the Strix and faces off against the group who seek a new leader.
| 57 | 13 | "Heart Shaped Box" | Chris Grismer | Michelle Paradise & Christopher Hollier | February 19, 2016 | 3J5613 | 0.87 |
The vengeful Aurora makes her move against Klaus and Elijah by using the captive Freya as bait to lure the originals into dangerous trap. Meanwhile, the Strix new leaders, Marcel and Aya, recruit the powerful coven to perform a spell to assist the closet allies against the Mikaelsons. Also, Davina finds a way to conjure up Kol and there is only one last key ingredient to complete the spell.
| 58 | 14 | "A Streetcar Named Desire" | Matt Hastings | Beau DeMayo & Diane Ademu-John | February 26, 2016 | 3J5614 | 1.07 |
The unexpected arrival of Stefan Salvatore in New Orleans, who is on the run from the vampire hunter Rayna, may be the key to helping Freya rescue Klaus and Elijah from a magical trap they are put under. Stefan and Hayley must join forces to rescue Klaus and Elijah from the Strix. Aya tasks Davina with performing a ritual to break the sirelines. The ritual goes awry, and only Klaus' line is broken, leaving Klaus feeling weakened. Klaus buries Aurora for all eternity. Hayley kills Aya, avenging Jackson's death. Davina, having broken Klaus' line, gathers his blood from the ritual, the ash of the dead, and brings Kol back to life. This episode concludes a crossover with The Vampire Diaries that begins on "Moonlight on the Bayou".
| 59 | 15 | "An Old Friend Calls" | Jeffrey Hunt | Carina Adly MacKenzie & Michael Russo | March 4, 2016 | 3J5615 | 0.88 |
Klaus learns that, due to his sireline being broken, all of his enemies are coming to attack him. Freya is forced to do a spell that will cloak his location, and he and Hayley leave the city with Hope. Davina worries that Kol may go back to his Ripper ways now that he is a vampire again. Kol finds out that when he was brought back to life, so was Finn.
| 60 | 16 | "Alone with Everybody" | Hanelle Culpepper | Ashley Lyle & Bart Nickerson | April 1, 2016 | 3J5616 | 0.93 |
Rumors begin to spread about the remaining white oak bullet that can kill an Original vampire, leading villains of the past to try to take down Klaus once and for all. Elijah urges his siblings to lie low at the compound while Marcel, Vincent and Josh chase down a lead involving a mysterious vampire named Sofya, who has the bullet and is working for a powerful mystery man who wants the Originals dead. Tensions inside the compound build as Kol wants revenge on Finn. Finn wants to go back to a witch body, still hating vampires. Davina bounds Finn to his vampire body for his whole life. Klaus and Hayley seek shelter with her former pack and learn that someone is hunting werewolves for an unknown reason. The White Oak Bullet is found and instead of burning it, Elijah entrusts it to Freya. Vincent, forced by the Ancestors, knocks out Freya, who wakes up in the lair of the mystery man, Lucien.
| 61 | 17 | "Behind the Black Horizon" | Joseph Morgan | Declan de Barra & Diane Ademu-John | April 8, 2016 | 3J5617 | 0.89 |
Lucien brings Freya and Vincent to Mystic Falls, where the Originals were created, to perform the ritual to make himself an Enhanced Original Vampire. Klaus and Hayley follow a lead to a mysterious organization who is experimenting on vampires. They learn that the organization has tortured and experimented on werewolves from each of the seven packs to make a specific venom for Lucien. Elijah and Finn go to save Freya, where they run into Matt. They save Freya, but are all unable to stop the ritual from taking place. Lucien flees after biting Finn. Kol is acting more dangerous and wild, leading Cami to warn Davina about his personality. Davina meets with Vincent where she tells him that the Ancestors are manipulating Kol, and they plot to take down the Ancestors. Due to the spell placed on Finn, Klaus cannot save him, and he dies surrounded by family. Freya realized Lucien had two viles of the formula, and they find that he is planning to give the other to Aurora.
| 62 | 18 | "The Devil Comes Here and Sighs" | Jesse Warn | Kyle Arrington & Michelle Paradise | April 15, 2016 | 3J5618 | 0.86 |
As the city celebrates its annual Jazz Fest, Lucien and Aurora take Klaus hostage, with Lucien wanting to court Aurora. Determined to get their brother back, Elijah and Freya face off against Lucien, who attempts to get Tristan's location, while also killing both of them. Klaus tries to free himself by manipulating Aurora, who reveals she is only using Lucien. Elijah and Freya realize they are outmatched and flee while leaving the Strix to attack Lucien. Hayley and Camille are able to free Klaus, but not before Aurora drinks the formula. Aurora is not able to die and become Enhanced, and is put into a sleeping spell. Kol becomes more and more manipulated by the Ancestors, so Marcel and Vincent send him away from Davina. However, he cannot leave town without dying. Lucien finds out that Aurora was only using him, so to get back at Klaus, he bites Cami.
| 63 | 19 | "No More Heartbreaks" | Millicent Shelton | Celeste Vasquez & Michael Narducci | April 29, 2016 | 3J5619 | 0.93 |
Klaus is forced to rely on his family and allies to find a cure for Cami's lethal bite as he keeps a watchful eye over Cami at the compound. With time running out, Freya turns to her arsenal of spells, while Vincent and Marcel head to Cami's apartment to gather a crucial ingredient. Meanwhile, Hayley and Elijah travel to the bayou in hopes of bringing back a potential antidote that could save Cami's life. The Ancestors compel Kol to kill Davina, to which he does. Klaus is unable to save Cami, so he goes into her head to say goodbye to her. Klaus and Cami share one last declaration of love to each other, with Cami revealing she is scared to die and does not want to go. Cami dies as Klaus promises to carry her with him forever, making her immortal, and avenge her.
| 64 | 20 | "Where Nothing Stays Buried" | John Hyams | Carina Adly MacKenzie & Christopher Hollier | May 6, 2016 | 3J5620 | 0.83 |
Following both Camille and Davina's deaths, Kol and Marcel go to the Mikaelsons asking for help to find a way to resurrect Davina. They send her to the place of the ancestors and Freya pulls her into a protective circle mere seconds before the ancestors could doom her to a fate worse than death. Meanwhile, Hayley and Klaus go to the bayou in an attempt to retrieve Rebekah's body before Lucien, in an attempt to provoke Klaus, gets to her first. Freya figures out a way to make Lucien vulnerable, but it means sending Davina's soul back to the ancestors. Klaus asks her to find another way, but Elijah and Freya go through with it. Davina is lost to the ancestors and the resurrection spell fails. They successfully weaken and finally kill Lucien thus avenging Camille's death, but Marcel disowns them as family. Also, Elijah and Hayley get close and Vincent and Marcel talk about taking New Orleans back from the Originals and the ancestors.
| 65 | 21 | "Give 'Em Hell, Kid" | Jeffrey Hunt | Ashley Lyle & Bart Nickerson | May 13, 2016 | 3J5621 | 0.79 |
Funerals are held for Camille and Davina, with Marcel looking to get back at the Mikaelsons for Davina's passing. Vincent tells a friend of Camille’s, Detective Kinney, how she really died and he in turn helps in his plan to cut off the ancestors. Freya and Elijah discover that Marcel plans to drink the serum recovered from Aurora’s blood and make himself an un-killable super-original to kill the Mikaelsons for good. Elijah interrupts Klaus trying to reconnect with Marcel and out of fear of the prophecy, ends up killing Marcel. Vincent and Kol leave the item that is intended to cut off the ancestors. They find Davina in the afterlife void who tells Vincent that she will take it from there sending them back and saying goodbye to Kol. Elijah confides in Hayley showing sadness to what he has done. Hayley tries to convince Klaus into forgiving Elijah while Vincent reveals to Josh that Marcel took the serum.
| 66 | 22 | "The Bloody Crown" | Matt Hastings | Beau DeMayo & Diane Ademu-John | May 20, 2016 | 3J5622 | 0.85 |
Freya checks the spell that locates Klaus's enemies to discover that all of them, now free from their sire, are closing in and fast on New Orleans. All of the vampires attack the Mikaelson compound, led by a newly super-vamped Marcel. Freya is poisoned and Elijah and Kol are infected with the now-powerful Marcel’s venomous bite. Rebekah Mikaelson returns to reason with Marcel while Klaus is put on a show trial. Marcel talks of countless horrible things Klaus has done and it appears as though Rebekah has begun succumbing to her curse and switches sides against Klaus. Klaus displays no guilt or remorse for his wrongdoings and it is decided that he deserves a slow death. His sentence is to be daggered with a magical item that leaves him to suffer while paralyzed for as long as Marcel desires. In the end, it is revealed that it is all part of the Original’s plan. They were all playing along to buy time and ensure Klaus would not have been killed. With Klaus daggered and walled into part of the compound, the rest of the Mikaelsons fall unconscious. Klaus now serves as an anchor and their consciousness are transferred to a dream-like world of Freya’s creation, where they can be kept alive. Marcel and his new horde of vampires finally take back control of the entire city of New Orleans, while Vincent takes back control of the church and proclaims himself the sole regent of the coven. The alone and defeated Hayley takes the coffins containing the unconscious Elijah, Rebekah, Kol, and Freya away from the city, along with daughter Hope, to try and find cures for Freya’s poison, Rebekah’s hex, and Elijah and Kol’s apparently incurable super-original bite, and to one day bring their family back together.

== Casting ==
For season 3, Riley Voelkel, who played Freya Mikaelson, was promoted to series regular. In July 2015, Jason Dohring was announced in the recurring role of Will Kinney, a detective. Also that July, it was announced that Lawrence Kao, Oliver Ackland, Andrew Lees and Rebecca Breeds had been cast in recurring roles. In January 2016, Matt Cedeño was announced as Gaspar Cortez, described as a vampire from the Mikaelson's past while Taylor Cole was announced as Sofya, a vampire.

== Ratings ==
Viewership and ratings per episode of The Originals season 3
| No. | Title | Air date | Rating/share (18–49) | Viewers (millions) | DVR (18–49) | DVR viewers (millions) | Total (18–49) | Total viewers (millions) |
|---|---|---|---|---|---|---|---|---|
| 1 | "For the Next Millennium" | October 8, 2015 | 0.4/1 | 0.89 | 0.4 | 0.84 | 0.8 | 1.73 |
| 2 | "You Hung the Moon" | October 15, 2015 | 0.5/2 | 1.12 | 0.4 | 0.78 | 0.9 | 1.90 |
| 3 | "I'll See You in Hell or New Orleans" | October 22, 2015 | 0.4/1 | 0.95 | 0.5 | 0.79 | 0.9 | 1.75 |
| 4 | "A Walk on the Wild Side" | October 29, 2015 | 0.4/1 | 1.07 | 0.4 | 0.75 | 0.8 | 1.82 |
| 5 | "The Axeman's Letter" | November 5, 2015 | 0.4/1 | 0.97 | 0.4 | 0.75 | 0.8 | 1.71 |
| 6 | "Beautiful Mistake" | November 12, 2015 | 0.4/1 | 0.98 | 0.4 | 0.71 | 0.8 | 1.68 |
| 7 | "Out of the Easy" | November 12, 2015 | 0.4/1 | 0.80 | 0.4 | 0.76 | 0.8 | 1.56 |
| 8 | "The Other Girl in New Orleans" | December 3, 2015 | 0.5/2 | 1.17 | 0.3 | 0.63 | 0.8 | 1.80 |
| 9 | "Savior" | December 10, 2015 | 0.4/1 | 0.97 | 0.4 | 0.64 | 0.8 | 1.61 |
| 10 | "A Ghost Along the Mississippi" | January 29, 2016 | 0.4/1 | 0.95 | 0.3 | 0.66 | 0.7 | 1.61 |
| 11 | "Wild at Heart" | February 5, 2016 | 0.4/1 | 0.92 | 0.3 | 0.67 | 0.7 | 1.59 |
| 12 | "Dead Angels" | February 12, 2016 | 0.3/1 | 0.80 | 0.4 | 0.71 | 0.7 | 1.50 |
| 13 | "Heart Shaped Box" | February 19, 2016 | 0.4/1 | 0.87 | 0.3 | 0.70 | 0.7 | 1.57 |
| 14 | "A Streetcar Named Desire" | February 26, 2016 | 0.5/2 | 1.07 | 0.3 | 0.71 | 0.8 | 1.78 |
| 15 | "An Old Friend Calls" | March 4, 2016 | 0.4/1 | 0.88 | 0.3 | 0.66 | 0.7 | 1.53 |
| 16 | "Alone with Everybody" | April 1, 2016 | 0.4/1 | 0.93 | 0.3 | 0.63 | 0.7 | 1.56 |
| 17 | "Behind the Black Horizon" | April 8, 2016 | 0.3/1 | 0.89 | 0.4 | 0.64 | 0.7 | 1.60 |
| 18 | "The Devil Comes Here and Sighs" | April 15, 2016 | 0.3/1 | 0.86 | 0.3 | 0.60 | 0.6 | 1.48 |
| 19 | "No More Heartbreaks" | April 29, 2016 | 0.4/1 | 0.93 | 0.3 | 0.59 | 0.7 | 1.52 |
| 20 | "Where Nothing Stays Buried" | May 6, 2016 | 0.3/1 | 0.83 | 0.3 | 0.59 | 0.6 | 1.42 |
| 21 | "Give 'Em Hell, Kid" | May 13, 2016 | 0.3/1 | 0.79 | 0.3 | 0.62 | 0.6 | 1.41 |
| 22 | "The Bloody Crown" | May 20, 2016 | 0.3/2 | 0.85 | 0.4 | 0.63 | 0.7 | 1.49 |
