= Pascale Armand =

American actress

- Born: Brooklyn, New York, U.S.
- Occupation: Actress
- Years active: 2000–present

Pascale Armand is an American actress. She has appeared in off Broadway and Broadway productions, most notable Eclipsed, for which she received Tony Award nomination for Best Featured Actress in a Play.

== Life and career ==
Armand was born in Brooklyn, New York. She studied acting at the Howard University and Georgetown University, before graduating from the acting program at New York University Tisch School of the Arts. She began her career in early 2000s, appearing in regional stage productions. On screen, Armand appeared in films Queenie in Love (2001), Kings County (2003) and Kinsey (2004). On television, Armand made guest appearances in Strangers with Candy, Law & Order: Criminal Intent and Law & Order: Trial by Jury. She also done voice-over work in the Grand Theft Auto: Liberty City Stories and Grand Theft Auto IV.

Armand appeared in off-Broadway plays Four, Belleville, Relevance, Natural Shocks, Merry Wives and Bernarda's Daughters. In 2011, she starred in the Danai Gurira' play The Convert receiving Ovation Award for Best Lead Actress in a Play and Joseph Jefferson Award nomination. She later made her Broadway debut in a revival of The Trip to Bountiful, starring Cicely Tyson. She starred in the Danai Gurira' 2015 off-Broadway play Eclipsed, receiving Obie Award for Distinguished Performance by an Ensemble and Outer Critics Circle Award for Outstanding Featured Actress in a Play. She reprised her role in the Broadway production receiving Tony Award nomination for Best Featured Actress in a Play.

After her stage breakout, Armand began appearing on television, playing guest-starring roles on Agents of S.H.I.E.L.D., The Blacklist, American Odyssey, Madam Secretary, Prodigal Son, Chicago Med, East New York and The Marvelous Mrs. Maisel. She played the leading role in the second season of Allblk horror-anthology series, Terror Lake Drive in 2022.

== Filmography ==
Year	Title	Role	Notes
2000	Strangers with Candy		Episode: "Ask Jerri"
2001	Queenie in Love	Cashier	
2002	Law & Order: Criminal Intent	Valerie Goodman	Episode: "Anti-Thesis"
2003	Kings County	Tina	
2004	Kinsey	Young Black Woman	
2005	Law & Order: Trial by Jury	ADA Cilla Preston	Episode: "Pattern of Conduct"
2013	Agents of S.H.I.E.L.D.	Akela Amador	Episode: "Eye Spy"
2015	The Blacklist	Ziggy	Episode: "Vanessa Cruz (No. 117)"
2015	American Odyssey	Kendra	Episode: "Beat Feet"
2016	Madam Secretary	Clerk	Episode: "Right of the Boom"
2019	Prodigal Son	Trini	Episode: "The Trip"
2021	Merry Wives		
2022	Chicago Med	Fabienne	Episode: "No Good Deed Goes Unpunished... in Chicago"
2022	Terror Lake Drive	Deja	Series regular, 7 episodes
2023	East New York	Fatou	Episode: "We Didn't Start the Fire"
2023	The Marvelous Mrs. Maisel	Delia	Episode: "Four Minutes"
