= From Mexico with Love =

- Film poster
- Directed by: Jimmy Nickerson
- Written by: Glen Hartford; Nicholas Siapkaris
- Produced by: Glen Hartford; Daniel Toll
- Starring: Kuno Becker; Steven Bauer; Danay Garcia; Bruce McGill; Stephen Lang
- Cinematography: Ted Chu; Rick Lamb
- Edited by: Paul Harb
- Music by: John Frizzell
- Production company: Cinamour Entertainment
- Distributed by: Roadside Attractions
- Release date: October 9, 2009
- Running time: 97 minutes
- Country: United States
- Language: English
- Box office: $549,495

From Mexico with Love is a 2009 American action-drama film directed by Jimmy Nickerson and starring Kuno Becker, Steven Bauer, Danay Garcia, Bruce McGill, and Stephen Lang.

== Plot ==
Hector Villa is a young Mexican national and border-crossing migrant and worker with boxing abilities mirroring his late father's. He could perhaps be good if he learned to think along with his pummeling. Despite all of this, Hector is a hard worker on a Texas farm who does what he can to provide for his ailing mother which includes pulling in a few side dollars from small-time, illegal gambling fights.

Tito, a "coyote" (a person who helps smuggle people across the border), spends his days as a snake catcher but at night, he helps smuggle immigrants across the border. After winning a fight in a local mechanic's garage, Hector tries to get another fight. However, the entertainment is interrupted by Tito, who scolds both Hector and the owner due to the fact that Tito could get into more trouble for illegal gambling fights (as if smuggling illegals across the border isn't enough).

Corralled, Hector goes to change but is followed in by another illegal migrant, Maria. It soon becomes known that they grew up together as kids and it also becomes apparent that Hector dislikes her (mostly because of her sarcastic teasing). Tito hands Hector medicine for his mother and the three head back to the farm where they all work. After settling all of the immigrants in, Maria goes into her own suite with Hector and makes herself at home despite Hector being less than welcoming. Hector then goes to his mother Rosa to give her the medicine, but it becomes apparent that she is getting worse. Hector begs her to not go out to the fields the next day but she declines, saying "No work, no pay". She scolds Hector for fighting to make money and reminds him that a fighter's lifestyle gave his father nothing. Maria walks in and gets reacquainted with Hector's mother who comments on how much she has grown and how beautiful she has gotten after nine years apart.

After a hard day’s work, Maria is stopped and charmed by the farm owner's cocky and pugilist son Robert while Hector looks on with uncertainty. While taking a walk around the ranch, Hector and Maria happen upon Robert's training session where he is sparring. Hector comments to Maria that, although Robert is very good, he has trouble with his balance. Overhearing this, Robert takes it as an insult. However, Robert's trainer, the alcoholic Billy Jenks, agrees with Hector.

Still feeling slighted, Robert challenges Hector on the spot. After getting outfitted, Hector and Robert spar but it quickly gets out of hand and has to be broken up by Billy. "Big Al" Stevens, the racist and brutish farm owner, and Robert's father show up. Billy is yelled at for letting Hector in the ring despite Tito and Billy saying that Hector shows promising talent. Al has none of it, and is firm in his wanting Robert to become a champion by any means necessary. Billy finds steroids in Robert's training bag and when Al reacts indifferently to it, Billy quits, finally fed up.

A few days later, Robert shows up with Maria to Hector's suite and offers him money for the sparring session the other day, saying he earned it. Hector refuses, saying he doesn't accept charity. When Robert leaves, Maria yells at Hector for being so prideful to which Hector responds that people like Robert play games and that as workers, they are nothing more than playthings. Furious, Maria storms away.

The next day on payday, the supervisors rant on how short the crop pickings are and begin to slash the worker's pay by bucket instead of by day as agreed upon previously. When Hector's mother's work is inspected, the supervisor's out of spite give her less than half day's work. When Hector argues with them, all the supervisors do is insult him. Enraged, Hector fights with the supervisors and beats them down (and unintentionally hits Tito when he tries to stop him). Robert walks in and subdues Hector and Al kicks Hector off the farm warning him that if he tries to come back, he will deport everyone.

Driven to the border and dumped off in a porta potty, Hector fumes all the way to a boxing gym where he sees Billy Jenks. He pleads with Billy to train him. It becomes apparent that Billy was the one who trained Hector's father and angrily refuses stating that although Hector's father was a decent man, he was stubborn, had a bad temper, wouldn't listen or train and believed that Hector would be no better. Hector leaves to go see Tito at the border while he is smuggling other immigrants to apologize. He implores Tito to look after his mother while he is gone.

Hector's persistence to get Billy to train him finally pays off but under the condition that he follow all of Billy's rules and guidelines. In the meantime, Robert continues to pursue and charm Maria. Robert invites Maria to a party later in the night and she attends despite warnings from Tito and her friend. Maria impresses everyone with her dancing and is guided into a corner with Robert who kisses her. But when Robert takes it further, Maria stops him. Irritated Robert leaves her believing that Hector has something to do with her hesitance and allows her to be picked on by the other guests. Maria leaves the party feeling humiliated.

Meanwhile, Hector tells Billy he wants to fight Robert. Billy trains Hector into using his brains as well as his fists stating that Hector uses to much anger in a fight disabling him from thinking clearly and leaving himself vulnerable. Hector trains in all sorts of unorthodox methods of boxing and becomes better with each session. However, Tito comes to get Hector as his mother is dying. Hector arrives in time to comfort his mother as she dies and takes her coffin back to Mexico to bury her. Afterwards, Maria comes to the gym to talk to Hector and tells him that she understands now what he meant earlier about being played for a game. She pleads with Hector not to fight Robert but he remains committed. Tito comes to Billy and offers a proposition where he bets heavy on Hector and getting every worker to put money on him for the fight against Robert and goes and does the same with Al who readily agrees to the fight and the terms as he needs the money to keep the farm from failing (insect damage to the crops).

On fight day, Tito needs to smuggle Hector, Maria, and a friend across the border but are nearly caught. Tito wards away the border patrol by comically telling them an embarrassing story about one of the agents who forgets to check the van and leaves. Before the fight, Hector kisses Maria passionately. Meanwhile, Robert refuses to take steroids believing he doesn't need them against Hector and Al reminds him that the fate of the farm depends on him. Hector shares a touching moment with Billy who tells Hector that his father was a great fighter and a great man just like Hector.

As the fight begins, it becomes apparent that Hector is outclassed by Robert who is 30 pounds heavier and much more experienced getting knocked down several times. However, with Billy's strategy, Hector holds his own against Robert and ferociously fights back. In the last round, both fighters are battered but Hector beats on Robert until he makes him throw up and knocks him out. At the end of the fight, as everyone comes up to congratulate Hector, he tells Maria he loves her to which she responds the same way. Al, defeated, asks what Tito intends to do with all the money he and the workers had won to which Tito replies that they are "going home".

The movie ends with Hector living happily with Maria in Mexico on a ranch which he named after his mother with Tito and all the other workers.

== Cast ==
- Kuno Becker as Hector Villa
- Steven Bauer as Tito
- Danay Garcia as Maria
- Bruce McGill as Billy Jenks
- Stephen Lang as Al "Big Al" Stevens
- Alex Nesic as Robert Stevens
- Michael Klesic as The Accountant
- Angélica Aragón as Rosa Villa
- Henry Kingi as Georgie
- Ron Yuan as Joe "Scar"
- Juan Gabriel Pareja as "Chucho"
- Gene LeBell as Himself

== Reception ==
From Mexico with Love received mixed reviews from critics. Joe Leydon of Variety called the film "An inaptly titled and thoroughly predictable indie drama", whereas Marc Savlov from The Austin Chronicle said "This up-from-the-fields slice of Tejano pride is a punchy, melodramatic piece of tried-and-true Americana that mixes cultures (and film genres) with an eye toward knocking down borders both cultural and contemporary."

== See also ==
- List of boxing films
