= S.W.A.T.: Firefight =

- DVD cover
- Directed by: Benny Boom
- Screenplay by: Reed Steiner
- Story by: Reed Steiner; Randy Walker; Michael Albanese; Ed Arneson
- Based on: S.W.A.T. by Robert Hamner
- Produced by: Neal H. Moritz; Amanda Lewis
- Starring: Gabriel Macht; Robert Patrick; Carly Pope; Giancarlo Esposito; Kristanna Loken
- Cinematography: Don Davis
- Edited by: David Checel
- Music by: John Paesano
- Production companies: Original Film; Stage 6 Films; RCR Media Group
- Distributed by: Sony Pictures Home Entertainment
- Release date: March 1, 2011
- Running time: 89 minutes
- Country: United States
- Language: English

S.W.A.T.: Firefight is a 2011 American direct-to-video action crime film directed by Benny Boom. It is a standalone sequel to the 2003 film S.W.A.T. and the second installment in the S.W.A.T. film series. Despite its name, the film does not feature any of the original cast nor are there any mentions of the previous 1975 television series of the same name.

A sequel, S.W.A.T.: Under Siege, was released in 2017.

== Plot ==
Sgt. Paul Cutler is an ex-military Los Angeles Police Department S.W.A.T. officer and considered to be one of the best, even holding a record of having no civilian casualties for ten years straight. After successfully rescuing hostages with no casualties, Cutler is requested to train the Detroit S.W.A.T. with an updated training curriculum from the F.B.I.'s Hostage Rescue Team training program.

Shortly after arriving in Detroit, Cutler immediately imposes his authority and has a rough time with the Captain of the department as well as one of the senior S.W.A.T. commanders Justin Kellogg. In the middle of a training exercise, the team is interrupted by an emergency call wherein ex-government agent Walter Hatch is holding his girlfriend hostage.

Although the girl is rescued unharmed, she hijacks Hatch's pistol and pleads with Cutler to move so she can shoot Hatch. When Cutler refuses to and tries to calm her down, she turns the weapon to her head and commits suicide.

Cutler's 10-year record with no hostages lost is broken and it takes its toll on him. The rift between Cutler and Kellogg escalates at a local bar, where Cutler makes a bet for Kellogg to beat him in a higher score with an arcade machine in exchange for Cutler leaving the city. Kellogg loses the bet, and is instead reassigned to "Charlie Company".

Due to low manpower, Cutler enlists military squadmate Lori Barton to assist his training. As the training goes on, Hatch steals a binder which contains details of tactics and information on the members.

Meanwhile, Cutler starts a passionate relationship with Kim Byers, the Detroit PD's Psychiatrist. The phone calls from Hatch now increase and he kidnaps Kim after planting a bomb under Cutler's car and shooting a member of S.W.A.T. The captain orders Cutler to return to Los Angeles, where Hatch would not be able to target him.

The team is then called to a derelict warehouse where things do not appear to be right as no officers are on the scene. In the van, communication from the station shows that the call was a hoax. One S.W.A.T. officer is killed by a bomb while Barton and Watters are kidnapped.

Aware of the full situation, Kellogg gives Cutler access to the armory and a squad car to save the hostages at one of the training grounds. Cutler briefly rescues Watters, but Watters perishes due to gunshot wounds to the chest from one of Hatch's henchmen.

Cutler manages to save Barton and pursues Hatch. Cutler engages Hatch in a hand-to-hand fight while Kim tries to cut free from a bomb vest. She manages to escape it after Lori breaks the chain holding her with a shot from her sniper rifle, and throws it towards Hatch just as Cutler kicks him back into the wall. Cutler fires a shot, hitting the vest and detonating it, while Hatch falls down from a window as the blast engulfs him.

The rest of the S.W.A.T. team arrives, with Cutler graduating the surviving members. Cutler asks Kim if she wants to go back to Los Angeles with him and she silently nods as they hold each other.

== Cast ==
- Gabriel Macht as Sergeant Paul Cutler
- Robert Patrick as Walter Hatch
- Carly Pope as Kim Byers
- Shannon Kane as Lori Barton
- Giancarlo Esposito as Inspector Hollander
- Kristanna Loken as Rose Walker
- Matt Bushell as Danny Stockton
- Nicholas Gonzalez as Justin Kellogg
- Micah Hauptman as Richard Mundy
- Gino Pesi as Wayne Wolport
- Kevin Phillips as Kyle Watters
- Dennis North as Captain Simon

== Reception ==
Rotten Tomatoes surveyed three reviews and judged two of them to be positive.
