= Girl in the Flower Dress =

- Agents of S.H.I.E.L.D. episode
- The episode was seen as more "mature" tonally than previous episodes, with the death scenes highlighted as contributing to this.
- Episode no.: Season 1 Episode 5
- Directed by: Jesse Bochco
- Written by: Brent Fletcher
- Cinematography by: Jeff Mygatt
- Editing by: Paul Trejo
- Original air date: October 22, 2013
- Running time: 43 minutes

Guest appearances
- Ruth Negga as Raina; Louis Ozawa Changchien as Chan Ho Yin / Scorch; Shannon Lucio as Debbie; Austin Nichols as Miles Lydon; Tzi Ma as Quan Chen; Cullen Douglas as Edison Po

Episode chronology
← Previous "Eye Spy"	Next → "FZZT"
- Agents of S.H.I.E.L.D. season 1

"Girl in the Flower Dress" is the fifth episode of the first season of the American television series Agents of S.H.I.E.L.D. Based on the Marvel Comics organization S.H.I.E.L.D., it follows Phil Coulson and his team of S.H.I.E.L.D. agents as they investigate the disappearance of a man with pyrokinetic abilities. It is set in the Marvel Cinematic Universe (MCU) and acknowledges the franchise's films. The episode was written by Brent Fletcher and directed by Jesse Bochco.

Clark Gregg reprises his role as Coulson from the film series, starring alongside Ming-Na Wen, Brett Dalton, Chloe Bennet, Iain De Caestecker, and Elizabeth Henstridge. Louis Ozawa Changchien portrays the super-powered man Chan Ho Yin, while Ruth Negga is introduced as Raina—the titular "girl in the flower dress". In addition, to support the episode's Hong Kong setting, actor Tzi Ma appears in a guest role as a Hong Kong agent of S.H.I.E.L.D., and Jeremy Zuckerman contributed performances on Chinese instruments for the musical score. The episode brings back elements from the series' pilot, and features ties to the MCU films.

"Girl in the Flower Dress" originally aired on ABC on October 22, 2013, and was watched by 11.16 million viewers within a week. The episode received a mixed critical response. It was praised for being more mature than previous episodes and for featuring a Marvel-like superhero, but also described as "perfunctory" and "mellow" by some critics.

== Plot ==
In Hong Kong, street performer Chan Ho Yin is convinced by the mysterious Raina to reveal his secret pyrokinetic abilities. When his S.H.I.E.L.D. monitor, Agent Quan Chen, discovers him missing the next day, Agent Phil Coulson and his team of agents are tasked with finding him. Quan reveals that Chan's location and abilities were leaked by the hacktivist group Rising Tide.

Skye, a new civilian recruit and S.H.I.E.L.D. trainee, was once a member of the Rising Tide. She traces the hack that released the information back to Miles Lydon, her secret boyfriend and Rising Tide contact. The team goes to Texas to confront Lydon, but Skye reaches him first; the two are caught together by Agent Melinda May and are taken into S.H.I.E.L.D. custody. Skye tries to defend them both, but turns on Lydon when the team finds evidence that he was paid for the information.

The team tracks the buyer, Raina, to a Project Centipede facility in Hong Kong, where they are draining Chan's fire-resistant platelets against his will to use as stabilizers for the Extremis serum within their super-soldiers. Chan, angry with this betrayal and with S.H.I.E.L.D. for constricting him, attacks both. He kills, among others, Quan and the Centipede head doctor Debbie. Realizing that Chan can't be reasoned with, Coulson and May inject him with a large dose of Extremis, causing him to explode. Lydon, convinced that what he did is harming people, helps by using his hacking skills to direct the blast through the ventilation and out the top of the building, while the others escape to safety.

Coulson releases Lydon after fitting him with a S.H.I.E.L.D. bracelet that prevents technology use. Coulson then confronts Skye about her true motivation for joining S.H.I.E.L.D., and she explains that she is searching for information on her parents, who she believes are tied to S.H.I.E.L.D. in some way. Coulson agrees to let her stay on the team and to help her in her search, but makes her wear a bracelet like Lydon's. In an end tag, Raina visits a member of Centipede in prison and asks him to contact the "Clairvoyant".

== Production ==
=== Development and writing ===
Marvel Television announced in October 2013 that the fifth episode of the series Agents of S.H.I.E.L.D. was titled "Girl in the Flower Dress", written by Brent Fletcher and directed by Jesse Bochco. The episode was originally set in Japan, with a Japanese guest character. After testing filming at Los Angeles' Little Tokyo as a stand-in for Japan, the crew decided that this would not work well enough and the episode was re-written to feature a Chinese character so filming could take place in Los Angeles' Chinatown instead.

The episode's end tag scene was originally meant to include Raina meeting with Ian Quinn, a villain from a previous episode in the season. This scene would have revealed that Quinn is a member of Centipede, but the writers felt it was too soon in the season to reveal this connection. The character Edison Po was created to be used instead. Fletcher said that Quinn is "kind of a sane guy, to a certain degree [w]hereas Po is a little creepy". Speaking to the exchange between Coulson and Skye when he catches her with Miles, Fletcher spoke to the "underlying bond" that was developing between the two despite the situation, with Fletcher adding the relationship was "a real underpinning of the show".

=== Casting ===
Marvel confirmed in September 2013 that the episode would star main cast members Clark Gregg as Phil Coulson, Ming-Na Wen as Melinda May, Brett Dalton as Grant Ward, Chloe Bennet as Skye, Iain De Caestecker as Leo Fitz, and Elizabeth Henstridge as Jemma Simmons. They also announced the episode's guest cast, including Louis Ozawa Changchien as Renshu Tseng, Ruth Negga as Raina, Austin Nichols as Miles Lydon, Shannon Lucio as Debbie, Tzi Ma as Agent Quan Chen, and Cullen Douglas as Edison Po. The name of Changchien's character was later revealed to actually be Chan Ho Yin. Changchien speaks fluent Japanese but does not speak Cantonese, so after his character was changed to Chinese to support the episode's new setting the actor had a few days before shooting to learn his new lines phonetically. Ma previously guest starred on another Joss Whedon-created series, Dollhouse. Lucio reprises her role from "Pilot", appearing again as the Centipede doctor, Debbie. Jimmy O. Yang cameos in the episode.

=== Filming and visual effects ===
Filming occurred from August 30 to September 11, 2013. The opening Hong Kong scene was shot in Los Angeles' Chinatown. Magician Gregory Wilson was brought to set to assist Changchien with hand movement and placement to make his magic "believable". The Centipede lab was shot at the Los Angeles Stock Exchange Building. Chan Ho Yin's fire abilities were achieved through practical and visual effects. LED lights were used during filming to get the proper interactive lighting from the fire that would be added digitally. Special effects supervisor Gary D'Amico lit a boulder attached to a zip line on fire to simulate the fireballs, allowing visual effects supervisor Mark Kolpack to composite the content together and enhance it further with additional digital fire simulations. It took about six hours for Changchien's burn prosthetics to be applied.

=== Music ===
Composer Bear McCreary wanted to introduce Chinese instruments into the score to support the Hong Kong setting, and collaborated with composer Jeremy Zuckerman who played the guzheng for the episode. McCreary found "the nearly ten-minute long action scene" at the climax of the episode to be "the real beast of this episode" and "one of the most challenging pieces [he had] composed yet for the series", calling it "pretty chaotic" and noting the difficulty the orchestra had in recording it. The episode also saw the return of several major themes, most notably the "Centipede Theme" from "Pilot". McCreary refrained from using the theme until Raina is revealed to be working for Centipede, at which point he relies on the theme for the rest of the episode, playing it on "ominous low strings [with] the creepy bells stat[ing] it more quickly above".

=== Marvel Cinematic Universe tie-ins ===
The Extremis virus from Iron Man 3 (2013) and "Pilot" reappears in this episode, and is stabilized using Chan's platelets to prevent it from exploding in future episodes. The explosive that Coulson uses to enter the Centipede facility is similar to the one he used in Iron Man (2008), and he strikes a similar pose when using it.

== Release ==
=== Broadcast ===
"Girl in the Flower Dress" was first aired in the United States on ABC on October 22, 2013. It was aired alongside the US broadcast in Canada on CTV, while it was first aired in the United Kingdom on Channel 4 on October 25, 2013. It premiered on the Seven Network in Australia on October 23, 2013.

=== Home media ===
The episode, along with the rest of Agents of S.H.I.E.L.D.'s first season, was released on Blu-ray and DVD on September 9, 2014. Bonus features include behind-the-scenes featurettes, audio commentary, deleted scenes, and a blooper reel. On November 20, 2014, the episode became available for streaming on Netflix. The episode, along with the rest of the series, was removed from Netflix on February 28, 2022, and later became available on Disney+ on March 16, 2022.

== Reception ==
=== Ratings ===
In the United States the episode received a 2.7/8 percent share among adults between the ages of 18 and 49, meaning that it was seen by 2.7 percent of all households, and 8 percent of all of those watching television at the time of the broadcast. It was watched by 7.39 million viewers. The Canadian broadcast gained 1.76 million viewers, the third highest for that day and the ninth highest for the week. The United Kingdom premiere had 2.52 million viewers and in Australia, the premiere had 1.6 million viewers, including 0.7 million timeshifted viewers. Within a week of its release, the episode was watched by 11.16 million U.S. viewers, above the season average of 8.31.

Following the episode's release, Screen Rant's Andre Dyce reviewed the series' ratings performance so far, saying over 7 million viewers is "still a far cry from trouble on their own", but as the show "continues to slip in both viewers and demographics, the trend could become problematic." He acknowledged that the drop in viewers from the series premiere, which had "some of the highest ratings in recent history" for ABC, to the second episode was to be expected, but the continued decrease in viewership since then was a sign of trouble for the series. He said, "A rocky start is to be expected, but by this point in the season, most procedural dramas tend to have hit their pace both in structure and audience." Dyce noted that fans of the MCU films had been expected to provide a "healthy viewership" for the series, and "enthusiasm seems to be waning" among those fans now.

=== Critical response ===
Eric Goldman of IGN graded the episode 8.1 out of 10, calling it "pretty damn busy and quite fun", highlighting Skye's character development and the drama it caused, as well as the connections to "Pilot". He praised the "dark, but also necessary" deaths depicted, and concluded that the series "is beginning to build its story in an intriguing way." James Hunt at Den of Geek found the episode to be "mostly, quite good," praising Skye's story, the idea that S.H.I.E.L.D. "might actually be as bad as the people they're trying to fight", and the character of Raina, who he said was "the closest thing this series has yet had to an original, interesting idea". Hunt criticized the dialogue, and found the character of Chan Ho Yin to be unrealistic, stating, "I loved the fact that they kind of, sort of, dredged up an actual Marvel character to use" but the character "bore almost no resemblance to an actual person". The Guardian's Graeme Virtue also criticized some of the dialogue, but enjoyed the character of Raina and the potential for her to return. He hoped that now Skye's secret has been revealed, "perhaps some of the other agents will get their time in the spotlight." Marc Bernardin of The Hollywood Reporter found the episode to be better than the first three but said it "wasn't as good" as "Eye Spy", explaining that he did not care about Scorch by the end of the episode and found most of it to be "just so very ... perfunctory."

David Sims of The A.V. Club graded the episode a "B−", stating, "I've defended this show against complaints that it's terminally bland, but formulaic material like this really does expose its flaws. It's definitely not an unwatchably bad show." He did praise the visual effects in the episode, saying, "This week's episode had a couple of very nicely-staged set pieces and, especially for broadcast TV, some excellent special effects. Fire is hard to pull off, even in a blockbuster movie, but this episode revolved around a character ... who can generate and manipulate fire, and everything he did looked pretty cool." Morgan Jeffrey at Digital Spy scored the episode 3 stars out of 5, calling it a "slow burn", and concluding that "Skye's arc is easily the weakest aspect of "Girl in the Flower Dress" but there's a decent villain and a strong climax to help compensate." Will Salmon of SFX also scored the episode 3 stars out of 5, stating "a shade more mature than the initial installments. It's a welcome growth, and it does feel like Agents Of S.H.I.E.L.D. is getting itself together. They found the right levels of warmth and humanity last week, and humour and drama this time around. Now they just need to start going on some genuinely compelling missions against decent enemies." Jim Steranko, known for his work on Nick Fury, Agent of S.H.I.E.L.D., felt the series "has settled into a pragmatic, if sometimes predictable comfort zone", and said that the episode "delivered enough premise, pace, and patter to get its audience through a mellow hour — and set the bar higher for the rest of the season."
