= Jen Harper =

American actress

- Born: Jennifer Harper; Atlanta, Georgia, U.S.
- Occupation: Actress
- Years active: 1989–present

Jen Harper is an American actress, known for her roles in television series In the Heat of the Night and Greenleaf.

== Life and career ==
Harper was born in Atlanta, Georgia and graduated from Spelman College in Medicine 1975, and later trained in London at the Royal Academy of Dramatic Art. She later began performing on stage, appearing in A Midsummer Night's Dream in London, and later returned to United States. From 1990 to 1994, Harper had a recurring role as Dr. Winona Day in the police drama series, In the Heat of the Night. Since then, Harper performed in many productions on Jomandi Theater, Horizon, Seven Stages the Alliance Theater, Theater in the Square, The Springer Opera House and Theatrical Outfit.

In 2010s, Harper returned to television appearing in series, such as Drop Dead Diva, Born Again Virgin and Being Mary Jane. From 2016 to 2020 she played Deacon Connie Sykes in the Oprah Winfrey Network drama series, Greenleaf. She also had a recurring role in the Bounce TV prime time soap opera,Saints & Sinners in 2018. In 2019, Harper starred in the comedy film, A Madea Family Funeral directed by Tyler Perry. In 2020, Harper appeared in the Holiday romantic comedy film, Cooking Up Christmas for Oprah Winfrey Network, and was regular cast member during the first season of Urban Movie Channel horror-anthology series, Terror Lake Drive. In 2021, she appeared in another made-for-television Holiday film, Kirk Franklin's A Gospel Christmas for Lifetime. Harper later was cast in a recurring roles in Black Mafia Family and Zatima.

== Filmography ==
- Driving Miss Daisy (1989) as Biltmore Hotel Dinner Guest
- In the Heat of the Night (1 episode, 1990) as Sarah Jenner
- Web of Deceit (1990) as Dr. Dubrow
- The Three Muscatels (1991) as Brothel Wench
- In the Heat of the Night (1 episode, 1991) as Samantha
- The Secret Passion of Robert Clayton (1992) as Georgia Reporter
- I'll Fly Away (2 episodes, 1992) as Elaine Landers
- In the Heat of the Night (14 episodes, 1991–1994) as Dr. Winona Day
- Savannah (2 episodes, 1996–1997) as Doctor
- Claudine's Return (1998) as Doctor
- Asunder (1999) as Doctor
- Soul Survivors (2001) as Savannah
- Drop Dead Diva (1 episode, 2014) as Donna
- Kill the Messenger (2014) as Ricky Ross Trial Judge
- Born Again Virgin (1 episode, 2015) as Linda-Kelly's Mother
- Survivor's Remorse (1 episode, 2015) as Correctional Officer
- Here We Go Again (1 episode, 2016) as Pat
- Being Mary Jane (1 episode, 2017)
- The Vampire Diaries (2 episodes, 2012–2017)
- Saints & Sinners (4 episodes, 2018) as Judge Dolores Mitchell
- Dinner for Two (2018) as Doctor
- Nappily Ever After (2018) as Aunt Yvette
- A Madea Family Funeral (2019) as Vianne
- American Soul (1 episode, 2019) as Mamie
- Greenleaf (27 episodes, 2016–2020) as Deacon Connie Sykes
- Cooking Up Christmas (2020) as Dolores
- Terror Lake Drive (5 episodes, 2020) as Mama
- Kirk Franklin's A Gospel Christmas (2021) as Mrs. Corrine
- The Righteous Gemstones (2 episodes, 202) as Senator
- Tom Swift (2 episodes, 2022) as Reverend Jones
- Hello (2022) as Elaine Valentine
- Black Mafia Family (2 episodes, 2023) as Auntie Rose
- Zatima (12 episodes, 2022–2023) as Gladys
- Festival of Trees (2024) as Dr. Stanley
