= Terror Lake Drive =

- Genre: Thriller; Horror; Anthology
- Created by: Jerry LaMothe; Kajuana S. Marie
- Composer: George J. Fontenette
- Country of origin: United States
- Original language: English
- No. of seasons: 3
- No. of episodes: 20

Production
- Executive producers: Brett Dismuke; Matthew Helderman; Jerry LaMothe; Nikki Love; Kajuana S. Marie; Luke Taylor; Albert Spevak; Grady Craig; Jumaane Ford; Tyler Gould; Stephen Leist; Thomas Mann
- Running time: 42 minutes
- Production companies: J. LaMothe Entertainment; Samad Davis Productions; Tycor International Film Company

Original release
- Network: Urban Movie Channel (season 1); Allblk (season 2–present)
- Release: November 25, 2020 – present

Terror Lake Drive is an American horror-thriller anthology television series created by Jerry LaMothe and Kajuana S. Marie. The first season of six episodes premiered on Urban Movie Channel on November 25, 2020. The first season follows a single mother from Baltimore who during the COVID-19 pandemic relocates to Atlanta, starred Shannon Kane, Donielle T. Hansley Jr., Lamman Rucker and Malik Yoba.

On August 17, 2021, the series was renewed for the second season by Allblk. It starred Pascale Armand, Yolonda Ross, Charles Malik Whitfield, Denise Boutte, Kendrick Cross, Cynthia Bailey and Reginae Carter. On June 15, 2023, the series was renewed for the third season. The season titled Terror Lake Drive: Summer Purge starred Deborah Joy Winans, Josh Ventura, Kennedy Chanel and Jaylon Gordon and premiered on November 16, 2023.

== Cast and characters ==
=== Season 1 ===
- Shannon Kane as Samantha
- Donielle T. Hansley Jr. as AJ
- Malik Yoba as Corey
- Jen Harper as Mama
- Brely Evans as Jojo
- Greyson Chadwick as Nova
- Lamman Rucker as Gerrod
- E. Roger Mitchell as Arnez
- Terri J. Vaughn as Ms. Chisholm

=== Season 2 ===
- Pascale Armand as Deja
- Yolonda Ross as Shana
- Charles Malik Whitfield as Mayor Delroy Brown
- Denise Boutte as Deputy Mayor Kenya
- Kendrick Cross as Dr. Eric Matthews
- NaShawn Kearse as Kevin McNeal
- Jay DeVon Johnson as Donovan Brown
- Jasmine Burke as Felicia
- Cynthia Bailey as Rose

=== Season 3 ===
- Deborah Joy Winans as Janice
- Josh Ventura as Ben
- Kennedy Chanel as Sarah
- Jaylon Gordon as Jacob
- E. Roger Mitchell as Thaddeus
- Jay Jones as The Executor
- Brittany L. Smith as Venus
- Johnnie Gordon as Hendrix
