= Spiked (film) =

- Directed by: Juan Martinez Vera
- Written by: Juan Martinez Vera
- Produced by: Per Melita
- Starring: Aidan Quinn
- Cinematography: Will Jobe; Hernán Toro
- Music by: Kubilay Uner
- Distributed by: Gravitas Ventures
- Release date: March 26, 2021
- Country: United States
- Language: English

Spiked is a 2021 American drama film written and directed by Juan Martinez Vera and starring Aidan Quinn. It is inspired by events in the life of Arizona-based newspaper publisher Joseph Soldwedel, who serves as an executive producer.

== Plot ==
John Wilson is a newspaper publisher in a small U.S./Mexico border town who denounces the abuse of power by local law enforcement. Wilson has been at it for years and has made more than a few enemies and stepped on more than a few toes. Following the killing of an immigrant worker, an incident that the police are unwilling to do anything about, the newspaper publisher and his team take on the plight of the family and of the community to find those responsible and bring them to justice. At every turn, his efforts are thwarted by an uncooperative police chief who seems to have her own agenda. Matters escalate when John succumbs to a mysterious illness that threatens his life and his investigation.

== Cast ==
- Aidan Quinn as John Wilson
- Deirdre Lovejoy as Chief Collins
- Danay García as Diana
- Carlos Gomez as Mike
- Wendy Makkena as Margaret
- Walter Belenky as Bradford
- Sean Dillingham as Chuck
- Lovensky Jean-Baptiste as Ricky

== Production ==
Principal photography occurred near Tucson, Arizona in August and September 2019. The indie film stars Aidan Quinn, best known for his role on the CBS series “Elementary.” Quinn delivers an outstanding performance as John Wilson, a character inspired by real-life events surrounding Arizona-based newspaper publisher Joseph Soldwedel. Soldwedel’s experience fighting injustices as a longtime newspaperman helped lend authenticity to the film, and his financial support gave birth to the project. Soldwedel and his son Brett served as the film’s executive producers

== Release ==
Gravitas Ventures acquired North American distribution rights to the film in February 2021. The film was released on VOD on March 26, 2021.
