= The Originals season 1 =

The Originals
- Season 1
- Promotional poster
- Showrunners: Julie Plec; Michael Narducci
- Starring: Joseph Morgan; Daniel Gillies; Claire Holt; Phoebe Tonkin; Charles Michael Davis; Daniella Pineda; Leah Pipes; Danielle Campbell
- No. of episodes: 22

Release
- Original network: The CW
- Original release: October 3, 2013 – May 13, 2014

Season chronology
- Next → Season 2

The Originals is an American supernatural drama television series created by Julie Plec for The CW. A spin-off of The Vampire Diaries, the series makes use of certain characters and story elements from the series of books of the same name. The first season premiered with a special preview on October 3, 2013, following the season premiere of its parent series, before premiering in its regular time slot on October 8, 2013.

The show is set in New Orleans which the Mikaelson family and Original vampires helped to build. In the first season, the focus is primarily on Klaus (Joseph Morgan), Elijah (Daniel Gillies), and Rebekah (Claire Holt), who discover in the series's backdoor pilot – which aired on April 25, 2013, as an episode of The Vampire Diaries – that Hayley Marshall (Phoebe Tonkin) is pregnant with Klaus' child.

Having fled the city many years ago, they return to find Klaus' former protégé, Marcel (Charles Michael Davis), in control of the French Quarter. Klaus decides to take back the city and enlists Elijah and Rebekah's help. The show also revolves around their relationship with other supernatural beings such as witches.

== Cast ==
=== Main ===
- Joseph Morgan as Niklaus "Klaus" Mikaelson
- Daniel Gillies as Elijah Mikaelson
- Claire Holt as Rebekah Mikaelson (Note: Holt is credited as a series regular from episode 1 to 16. From episode 17 to 21, she is not credited and does not appear. In episode 22, she is credited as "also starring".)
- Phoebe Tonkin as Hayley Marshall
- Charles Michael Davis as Marcellus "Marcel" Gerard
- Daniella Pineda as Sophie Deveraux (Note: Pineda is credited as a series regular from episode 1 to 13. From episode 14 to 22, she is not credited and does not appear.)
- Leah Pipes as Camille "Cami" O'Connell
- Danielle Campbell as Davina Claire

=== Recurring ===
- Shannon Kane as Sabine Laurent (possessed by Celeste Dubois)
- Eka Darville as Diego
- Callard Harris as Thierry Vanchure
- Sebastian Roché as Mikael
- Malaya Rivera Drew as Jane-Anne Deveraux
- Karen Kaia Livers as Agnes
- Steven Krueger as Joshua "Josh" Rosza
- Alexandra Metz as Katie
- Raney Branch as Celeste DuBois
- Shane Coffey as Timothy
- Todd Stashwick as Kieran O'Connell
- Matt Kabus as Sean O'Connell
- Shannon Eubanks as Bastianna Natale
- Yasmine Al-Bustami as Monique Deveraux
- Diana Chiritescu and Natalie Dreyfuss as Cassie (herself; possessed by Esther)
- Tasha Ames as Eve
- Jesse C. Boyd as Cary
- Owiso Odera as Papa Tunde
- Elyse Levesque as Genevieve
- Aubrey DeVaney and Alexa Yeames as Abigail
- Nathan Parsons as Jackson Kenner
- Chase Coleman as Oliver
- Teri Wyble as Clara Summerlin (possessed by Celeste DuBois)
- Peta Sergeant as Francesca Correa

=== Special guest ===
- Michael Trevino as Tyler Lockwood

=== Guest ===
- Nathaniel Buzolic as Kol Mikaelson
- Devon Allowitz as Henrik Mikaelson
- McCarrie McCausland as Marcel Gerard (young)
- Johnny Walter as Dwayne
- Morgan Alexandria as Lana
- Aiden Flowers as Klaus Mikaelson (young)
- Perry Cox as Elijah Mikaelson (young)
- Callie McClincy as Rebekah Mikaelson (young)
- Yusuf Gatewood as Vincent Griffith (possessed by Finn Mikaelson)

== Episodes ==
No. overall	No. in season	Title	Directed by	Written by	Original release date	Prod. code	US viewers (millions)
1	1	"Always and Forever"	Chris Grismer	Michael Narducci & Julie Plec	October 3, 2013	2J7802	2.21
Three hundred years ago Elijah, Rebekah and Klaus arrive in the French quarter of New Orleans, along with Finn and Kol daggered in coffins. In the present, Klaus returns to New Orleans after he receives a threatening letter. Elijah searches for Klaus, arriving in New Orleans before him. He finds the witch who called Klaus back, Jane Anne Deveraux. He meets her sister, Sophie, and other witches of the coven and they tell him that Jane Anne called Klaus to get rid of Marcel, as Marcel has been killing witches who were practicing magic. Klaus goes to his former home in the French quarter, where he and Marcel argue. Elijah calls Rebekah to let her know what is going on in New Orleans. Klaus is not willing to accept that Hayley is pregnant with his child. Sophie reveals that her sister linked Sophie's body to Hayley's. Elijah makes a deal with Marcel to give Jane Anne's body to the witches and allow them to cremate her; in return, Klaus would give his blood to cure Thierry and Marcel agrees. Elijah makes Hayley a promise that he will protect her. Klaus later daggers Elijah.
2	2	"House of the Rising Son"	Brad Turner	Diane Ademu-John & Declan de Barra	October 8, 2013	2J7801	1.92
Rebekah returns to New Orleans in search of Elijah, and meets Hayley, who gives her some unexpected news. Concerned her brother Klaus is up to no good, Rebekah seeks help from a reluctant Sophie. Hayley decides to get rid of the baby, but is attacked by Marcel's vampires. Determined to uncover Marcel's secret weapon, Klaus stays one step ahead and executes his plan using Cami. After a run-in with Marcel, Rebekah is reminded of all the anger and disappointment Klaus has caused her throughout the years. Finally, Marcel enlists the powerful Davina's help in his own dangerous plan.
3	3	"Tangled Up in Blue"	Chris Grismer	Ashley Lyle & Bart Nickerson	October 15, 2013	2J7803	2.22
After discovering interesting news about someone in Marcel's inner circle, Klaus and Rebekah come together to attempt to unravel Marcel's empire and save Elijah in the process, but Klaus soon develops his own plan. They enlist help from Sophie, who is reluctant to get involved for fear of the wrath of Marcel's secret weapon, Davina. Rebekah sneakily invites an oblivious Camille to a huge vampire party thrown by Marcel, managing to anger Marcel in the process. Elsewhere, Hayley learns from the witch Sabine the supernatural creatures of New Orleans are reacting to the potential existence of a hybrid baby.
4	4	"Girl in New Orleans"	Jesse Warn	Michelle Paradise & Michael Narducci	October 22, 2013	2J7804	2.23
With the annual Dauphine Street music festival around the corner, Davina, itching for a night out, convinces Marcel to let her attend. Marcel cautiously obliges but asks Camille to keep a watchful eye on Davina. Agnes convinces Hayley to visit a mysterious doctor in the bayou where she makes a shocking discovery. Meanwhile, Klaus takes a special interest in Cami, who reveals some alarming information about her past, and a determined Rebekah is on a mission to get to the bottom of a recent strange encounter involving Elijah.
5	5	"Sinners and Saints"	Chris Grismer	Marguerite MacIntyre & Julie Plec	October 29, 2013	2J7805	2.05
Angered by recent events involving the safety of his unborn baby, Klaus demands answers from Sophie, believing she was involved. Sophie reveals to Klaus and Rebekah a troubling secret from her past that her coven would conduct a ritual known as the Harvest where four young witches (one of which was Sophie's niece as well as Davina) would be ritually killed with their throats cut and their power to be transformed to the earth and their bodies resurrected. Meanwhile, Marcel asks Klaus to accompany him to the bayou after gruesome remains of witches who attacked Hayley are discovered, while Rebekah, Sophie and Hayley set off on a mission of their own to find the witches origins. Elsewhere, Davina confides in an unexpected ally and reveals shocking information about the witches, ultimately leading to a disturbing revelation.
6	6	"Fruit of the Poisoned Tree"	Michael Allowitz	Charlie Charbonneau & Diane Ademu-John	November 5, 2013	2J7806	2.03
When Klaus discovers Hayley's life is being threatened, he goes to extreme lengths to protect her and their unborn baby. Having a difficult time dealing with the tragic events of her past, Camille turns to Father Kieran for guidance. Feeling as though he can trust no one, Marcel visits an old friend to seek out some advice, while Davina takes steps to learn how to control her magic. Finally, Klaus delivers some surprising news to Father Kieran.
7	7	"Bloodletting"	Jeffrey Hunt	Michael Russo & Michael Narducci	November 12, 2013	2J7807	2.40
Tyler Lockwood makes his way to New Orleans set on killing Klaus and when Hayley makes a startling revelation, she grows concerned for herself and the baby. Amidst growing tensions between them, Klaus and Elijah turn to Sabine for help in locating Hayley, who has gone missing. After making a trip down to the bayou, Klaus has a surprising and dangerous encounter with an unexpected visitor. Meanwhile, Davina makes a surprising connection, and Marcel makes Rebekah an enticing offer that leaves her torn.
8	8	"The River in Reverse"	Jesse Warn	Declan de Barra & Julie Plec	November 26, 2013	2J7808	2.38
Tyler Lockwood survives and tells Marcel and his gang about Hayley and how Klaus is planning to use the baby 's blood to turn werewolves into hybrids. Rebekah, facing a difficult decision, turns to Father Kieran for guidance. She interrupts Tyler's speech by snapping his neck and Marcel puts Tyler in the garden. Rebekah tells that she doesn't want the baby to be a hybrid producing machine. Elijah struggles with the consequences of a recent fallout with Klaus. Hayley remains by his side but is soon drawn away by a mysterious figure who sheds some light on her past. Meanwhile, a frustrated Camille struggles to make sense of a cryptic message she's come across.
9	9	"Reigning Pain in New Orleans"	Joshua Butler	Ashley Lyle & Bart Nickerson	December 3, 2013	2J7809	2.33
Marcel, deeply conflicted by recent events, is surprised when Klaus opens up to him about some of his past indiscretions. Camille tries to make sense of cryptic messages she's come across and is disturbed when she gains some insight into Klaus' past. Meanwhile, in a surprising turn of events, the human faction takes matters into their own hands, resulting in a violent confrontation. Elsewhere, when Hayley learns of a plan to harm the werewolves in the bayou, she turns to Elijah and Rebekah for help. After heading to the bayou, they run into a werewolf named Eve, who has information that leads them to a shocking discovery.
10	10	"The Casket Girls"	Jesse Warn	Charlie Charbonneau & Michelle Paradise	January 14, 2014	2J7810	2.07
While Davina tries to help Camille by undoing all of Klaus's compulsion and returning her memories, Klaus alongside Elijah and Marcel use Davina's love interest, Timothy, to get her attention. Sophie learns that Davina is free and seeks Hayley's help to find the grave of an old flame of Elijah. When Davina confronts Klaus, Rebekah helps Davina and tries to prove her trust. Rebekah plans ahead and starts to create new friendships so she could take over the city. Meanwhile, Sophie finds Celeste's grave and Elijah realizes the danger Davina was talking about.
11	11	"Après Moi, Le Déluge"	Leslie Libman	Marguerite MacIntyre & Diane Ademu-John	January 21, 2014	2J7811	2.51
Elijah and Klaus try to learn more about the premonition of Celeste by Davina. Hayley tells Elijah that she told Sophie about Celeste's remains. When Elijah confronts Sophie she finds out that Davina's powers might threaten everyone and the only way to stop her is to finish the "Harvest" ritual. Also, Rebekah who is trying to make more alliances talks to Sophie and asks if she would want to form an alliance against Klaus and Marcel. On the other hand, Celeste's bones can't make Sophie an elder, so Elijah suggests to use their mother's. Sophie is then able to finish the ritual and she kills Davina, but none of the four girls resurrect. In the end, Sabine, who really is Celeste (Celeste has possessed Sabine's body) brings back three powerful witches for unknown reason.
12	12	"Dance Back from the Grave"	Rob Hardy	Michael Russo & Michael Narducci	January 28, 2014	2J7812	2.32
Still angered, Marcel refuses to help Niklaus when a gruesome discovery is made. Rebekah is taken back when she discovers the remnants of a sacrifice down by the docks, coming to the conclusion that it's the work of a fearsome warlock from their distant past. When Elijah receives information that Rebekah is in danger, he and Hayley set off to find her. Camille, while confronting Marcel, learns details of his dark and tragic past, but they are cut short and put on-edge when an unexpected visitor intrudes on them. Niklaus faces his most powerful foe yet, one that has an unprecedented advantage over him, named Alfons Delgado also known as "Papa Tunde." He is a powerful warlock who had issues with The Originals in the past. He attacks Rebekah and desiccates her to channel her energy. Upon his return, Marcel reveals to Cami how Klaus tortured Tunde before killing him. Elijah, who is worried about Rebekah goes after her traces and Hayley accompanies him. He finds her lying on the floor inside Tunde's spell circle but he can't get into it to save her. He learns from Sophie that the only way to save Rebekah is by breaking the spell with Hayley's blood (from the baby who is one-quarter a witch). Meanwhile, it is revealed that Marcel was the one who brought Tunde in the city a few years ago in order to defeat Klaus. Tunde kills the imprisoned vampires under Klaus' mansion and later sacrifices himself to Celeste (Sabine) in order to give her the power to defeat Klaus.
13	13	"Crescent City"	Chris Grismer	Michael Narducci & Julie Plec	February 4, 2014	2J7813	2.10
At the re-opening of St. Anne's Church, Father Kieran is hexed by Bastianna. Marcel and Rebekah grow concerned when the reemergence of Genevieve threatens to expose a deadly secret they’ve kept buried for almost 100 years. Meanwhile, Sophie's niece, Monique, is resurrected, but Sophie soon realizes there might be something else going on. With the full moon looming, Hayley lets Rebekah in on her plan to throw a party for her werewolf clan, but she almost dies in a fire that witches set. Elijah finds himself facing his own dilemma when he has to choose between Hayley and his siblings. Klaus takes drastic measures in the Cauldron. Monique kills Sophie, saying that the Ancestors believe she still lacks "faith."
14	14	"Long Way Back from Hell"	Matt Hastings	Ashley Lyle & Bart Nickerson	February 25, 2014	2J7814	1.83
In 1919, Marcel and Rebekah begin a plan in order to keep their unconditional love forever. Rebekah works as a nurse and befriends the witch Genevieve as well as Clara Summerlin (who happened to be Celeste), and later uses Genevieve to bring back Rebekah's father, Mikael, who can kill Klaus. However when Rebekah attacks Genevieve, Clara witnesses it and Rebekah infects both of them with a contagious bloody cloth, leaving them to die. In the present, Genevieve reveals Marcel and Rebekah's betrayal to Klaus. Hayley attacks Celeste, looking for answers. Finally, when Klaus is freed and is on his way to punish Rebekah for her betrayal, Elijah comes in time to save both her and Marcel.
15	15	"Le Grand Guignol"	Chris Grismer	Declan de Barra & Diane Ademu-John	March 4, 2014	2J7815	1.80
When Klaus' health is restored, he reveals Rebekah's betrayal to Cami about summoning their father long ago. Rebekah and Marcel are on the run and makes a very shocking plan to keep their relationship still. While Elijah makes a settlement about handing one page of her mother's grimoire. Celeste is still confined on Hayley's request to undo the curse on her bloodline until she agreed. In the cemetery, Celeste warns Elijah some ungrateful hearsay until he was infuriated and finally attacks her but it is to no avail.
16	16	"Farewell to Storyville"	Jesse Warn	Michael Narducci	March 11, 2014	2J7816	1.73
Since Davina has returned, Marcel hopes to save Rebekah, who is stuck in the Cemetery with Klaus and Elijah because of Celeste's spell. Cami meets Davina, who immediately finds that she visited her with a purpose, which is to reverse the spell over her uncle. Marcel turns to Genevieve in order to save Rebekah's life, which she agrees with the deal to have Davina returned to the witches. Klaus viciously stabs Elijah with Papa Tunde's blade, and later Rebekah with the White Oak Stake, however he doesn't kill her. Instead, Klaus frees Rebekah and leaves her to finally live the life she always wanted. After a farewell with Elijah, Marcel and Hayley, Rebekah finally leaves New Orleans.
17	17	"Moon Over Bourbon Street"	Michael Robison	Michelle Paradise & Christopher Hollier	March 18, 2014	2J7817	1.53
After accusing Klaus of doing nothing while their control over the Quarter crumbles, Elijah makes a move to take matters into his own hands. He receives an intriguing offer of support from Francesca, a beautiful woman from a powerful New Orleans family. In an attempt to bring the warring factions of the city together, the Mikaelsons throw an extravagant party, where Klaus offers Jackson a tempting deal, Elijah and Hayley share a dance, and a violent fight comes to a surprising end. Finally, even as Marcel works on a new path to power, he continues to help Camille deal with her Uncle Kieran's tragedy.
18	18	"The Big Uneasy"	Leslie Libman	Marguerite MacIntyre & Michael Russo	April 15, 2014	2J7818	1.52
Genevieve asks Elijah to allow her coven to publicly celebrate a traditional feast day, where members of the community offer the witches gifts in return for blessings. Monique and Genevieve disagree over what the ancestors want from them, and Genevieve reveals her plan to build the witches' power. When Elijah focuses his attention on restoring their home to its former glory, Klaus accuses him of doing it only to impress Hayley. Next, Klaus sets a new plan in motion by finding Cary, a werewolf from his own line, and sending him off to find a missing piece of family history. Marcel lets Thierry in on his new plan to rebuild his power, but Diego has his own ideas about the future. At the Feast of the Blessings, Monique and Genevieve try to use the ceremony to teach Davina a lesson, but Klaus intervenes and gives Davina a surprisingly important gift. While Hayley struggles to decide where her loyalties should lie, the ceremony explodes into violence.
19	19	"An Unblinking Death"	Kellie Cyrus	Ashley Lyle & Bart Nickerson	April 22, 2014	2J7819	1.50
Desperate to help Kieran, Camille insists on an unconventional treatment, but her good intentions lead Kieran to a violent episode. After Klaus and Elijah disagree over the best way to handle the Crescent Wolves, Elijah makes a trip to the bayou, where he is witness to a horrific explosion that only adds to the hatred and mistrust among the communities. While Jackson and Elijah work to save the wounded, Hayley learns a surprising piece of her family history from Marcel.
20	20	"A Closer Walk with Thee"	Sylvain White	Carina Adly MacKenzie & Julie Plec	April 29, 2014	2J7820	1.77
Hayley confronts a surprising enemy as she and her unborn baby fall into peril during a celebratory wake to honor a fallen member of the community. In order to save Hayley, Klaus and Elijah enlist the help of Genevieve who struggles to maintain control over Davina and the other young witches. Camille tells Marcel that Francesca is determined to find a mysterious key that may unlock a family secret. Meanwhile, as Klaus suffers from nightmares of his father Mikael, he is forced to examine his troubled relationship with his own adoptive son, Marcel. Hayley can't control her feelings anymore and passionately kisses Elijah.
21	21	"The Battle of New Orleans"	Jeffrey Hunt	Charlie Charbonneau & Michael Narducci	May 6, 2014	2J7821	1.44
The war between Marcel and Klaus has begun with Marcel making the first move. Davina is followed by Mikael, who is on a mission of his own — to get brought back and kill Klaus. Cami discovers important information about Francesca's bloodline that can change the landscape of the started war. Genevieve weakens Klaus, and while Elijah recovers he discovers that Hayley is missing. Taken by the witches and now in labour, she learns what they intend to do with her baby.
22	22	"From a Cradle to a Grave"	Matt Hastings	Diane Ademu-John	May 13, 2014	2J7822	1.76
Hayley gives birth, after which the witches kill her and leave with the baby. Davina has brought Mikael back to life and is controlling him to use him as a secret weapon against Klaus. Hayley, who—having died with her daughter's blood in her system—is now in transition to becoming a hybrid, joins Elijah, Klaus, and ultimately Marcel to go after Hope. Klaus later comes up with a plan to keep his daughter safe, which includes sending Hope away with Rebekah. Cassie, the fourth harvest girl, puts a rose on Esther's grave, accompanied by a boy who calls her "mother".

== Casting ==
Joseph Morgan, Daniel Gillies and Phoebe Tonkin were the first members of the cast announced, reprising their roles from The Vampire Diaries. On February 1, 2013, Daniella Pineda was announced as Sophie Deveraux. In February, Charles Michael Davis was announced as Marcel Gerard, Danielle Campbell was announced as Davina Claire, Leah Pipes was announced as Camille O'Connell, and Claire Holt was confirmed to have joined the series, reprising her role of Rebekah Mikaelson from The Vampire Diaries. In July, Shannon Kane and Steven Krueger were announced as Sabine, a witch, and Josh, respectively. Josh was originally supposed to die after a few episodes but this was changed. In August, Todd Stashwick was announced as Kieran O'Connell. It was also confirmed that Sebastian Roché would reprise his role as Mikael from The Vampire Diaries.

== Reception ==
The first season received mixed reviews with 7.8 from IMDB. On Rotten Tomatoes the season holds a 57% based on 28 reviews, with an average rating of 5.61/10. The critics consensus reads, "The Originals may overwhelm casual viewers with its myriad twists and bevy of supernatural beings, but this is a sleek, atmospheric Vampire Diaries spinoff with potential."

== Ratings ==
Viewership and ratings per episode of The Originals season 1
No.	Title	Air date	Rating/share (18–49)	Viewers (millions)	DVR (18–49)	DVR viewers (millions)	Total (18–49)	Total viewers (millions)
1	"Always and Forever"	October 3, 2013	1.0	2.21	TBD	TBD	TBD	TBD
2	"House of the Rising Sun"	October 8, 2013	0.9	1.92	TBD	TBD	TBD	TBD
3	"Tangled Up in Blue"	October 15, 2013	1.1	2.22	TBD	TBD	TBD	TBD
4	"Girl in New Orleans"	October 22, 2013	0.9	2.23	TBD	TBD	TBD	TBD
5	"Sinners and Saints"	October 29, 2013	1.0	2.05	TBD	TBD	TBD	TBD
6	"Fruit of the Poisoned Tree"	November 5, 2013	0.9	2.03	TBD	TBD	TBD	TBD
7	"Bloodletting"	November 12, 2013	1.1	2.40	TBD	TBD	TBD	TBD
8	"The River in Reverse"	November 26, 2013	1.1	2.38	TBD	TBD	TBD	TBD
9	"Reigning Pain in New Orleans"	December 3, 2013	1.0	2.33	TBD	TBD	TBD	TBD
10	"The Casket Girls"	January 14, 2014	1.0	2.07	TBD	TBD	TBD	TBD
11	"Après Moi, Le Déluge"	January 21, 2014	1.1	2.51	TBD	TBD	TBD	TBD
12	"Dance Back from the Grave"	January 28, 2014	1.0	2.32	TBD	TBD	TBD	TBD
13	"Crescent City"	February 4, 2014	0.9	2.10	TBD	TBD	TBD	TBD
14	"Long Way Back from Hell"	February 25, 2014	0.8	1.83	TBD	TBD	TBD	TBD
15	"Le Grand Guignol"	March 4, 2014	0.8	1.80	TBD	TBD	TBD	TBD
16	"Farewell to Storyville"	March 11, 2014	0.9	1.73	TBD	TBD	TBD	TBD
17	"Moon Over Bourbon Street"	March 18, 2014	0.7	1.53	TBD	TBD	TBD	TBD
18	"The Big Uneasy"	April 15, 2014	0.7	1.52	TBD	TBD	TBD	TBD
19	"An Unblinking Death"	April 22, 2014	0.7	1.50	TBD	TBD	TBD	TBD
20	"A Closer Walk with Thee"	April 29, 2014	0.8	1.77	TBD	TBD	TBD	TBD
21	"The Battle of New Orleans"	May 6, 2014	0.6	1.44	TBD	TBD	TBD	TBD
22	"From a Cradle to a Grave"	May 13, 2014	0.8	1.76	TBD	TBD	TBD	TBD
