= Shannon Kane =

American actress (born 1985)

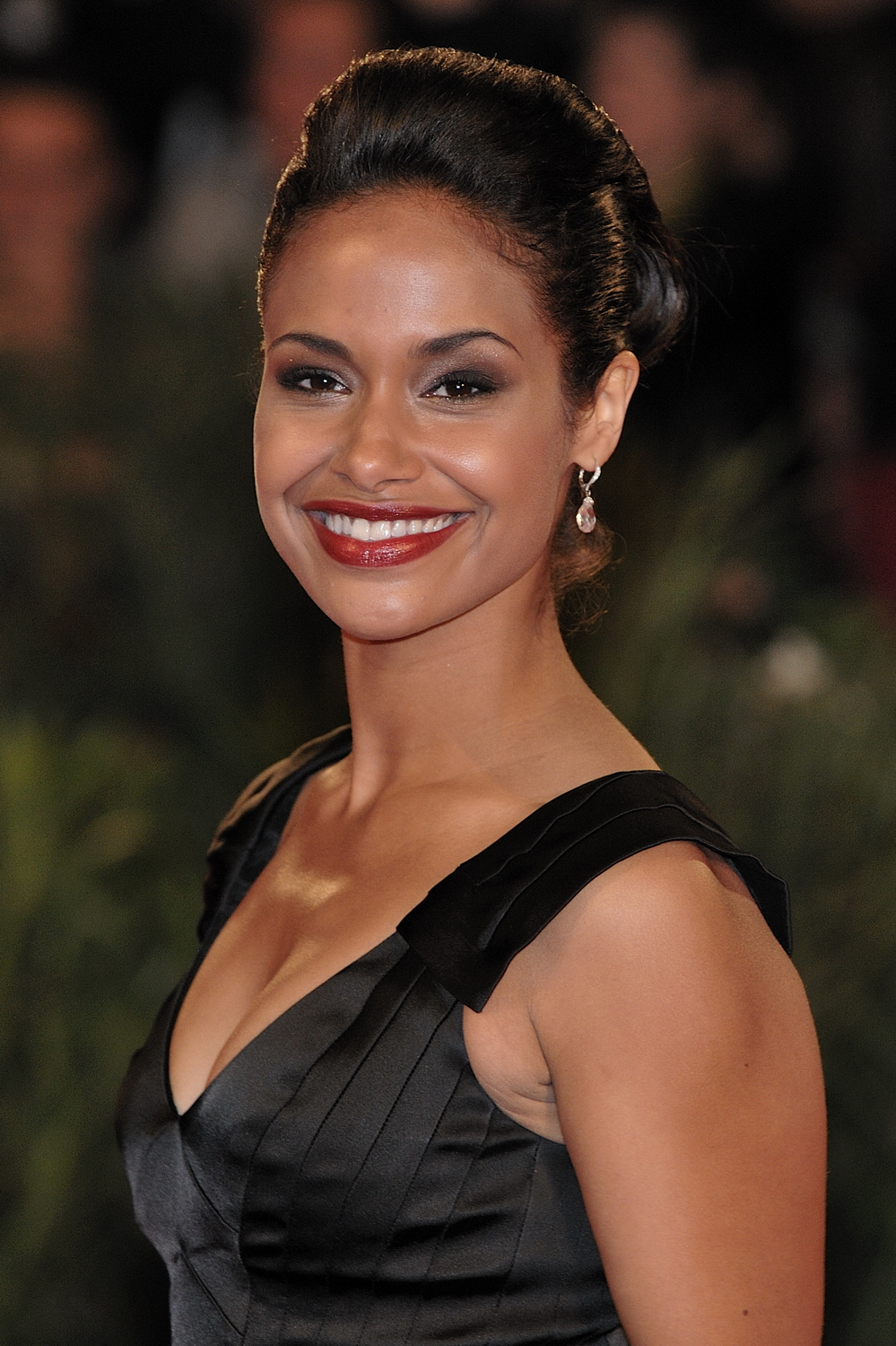
- Kane at the 66th Venice International Film Festival in September 2009
- Born: Shannon Elizabeth Kane; September 14, 1986 (age 40); Kalamazoo, Michigan, U.S.
- Education: Western Michigan University
- Occupation: Actress
- Years active: 2005–present
- Children: 1

Shannon Elizabeth Kane (born September 14, 1986) is an American actress. She is best known for her roles as Traci Madsen on the Nick at Nite family drama series Hollywood Heights (2012), Natalia Fowler on the ABC daytime soap opera All My Children (2008–2011) and Sabine Laurent / Céleste Dubois on The CW fantasy supernatural drama series The Originals (2013–14).

== Early life ==
Shannon Elizabeth Kane was born in Kalamazoo, Michigan. She attended Portage Central High School in Portage, Michigan and Western Michigan University.

== Career ==
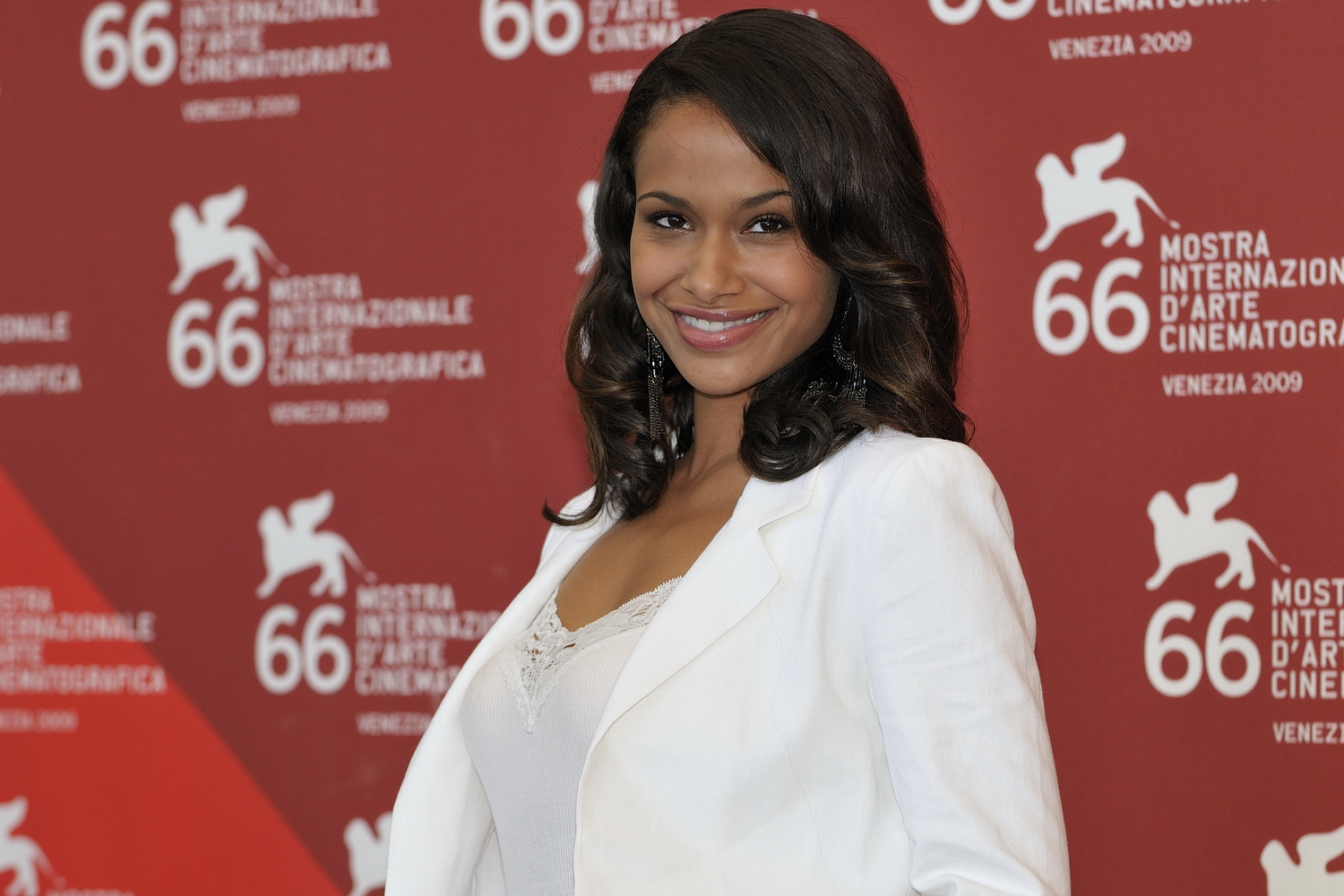
Shannon Kane in 2009

Her first on-screen appearance was a guest role as Leslie Anderson in an episode of the police procedural drama series CSI: Miami. Kane had small guest roles on the television shows Entourage (2007) and The Young and the Restless (2007). In 2008, she joined the cast of ABC's daytime soap opera All My Children as Natalia Fowler. Kane appeared in two 2009 films; Brooklyn's Finest and Blood and Bone. She also had roles in films Madea's Big Happy Family (2011), S.W.A.T.: Firefight (2011) and The Collection (2012).

In 2012, she played a successful graphic designer called Traci Madsen in the family drama series Hollywood Heights, which aired on Nick at Nite and TeenNick from June 18 to October 5, 2012. She landed a recurring role as Sabine Laurent, a witch who is possessed by Celeste DuBois, in the first season of The CW's supernatural drama series The Originals. Kane had a recurring role opposite Boris Kodjoe in three episodes on the final season of CBS’ medical drama series Code Black. In October 2018, Deadline reported that Kane had joined the cast of BET's musical drama series American Soul, portraying attorney Ilsa Dejarnette. She appeared in four episodes on the first season of American Soul.

She portrayed Sam in anthology thriller series Terror Lake Drive in 2020. Terror Lake Drive is a six-part series that follows a single mother who moves to Atlanta in an attempt to avoid her troubled past.

== Personal life ==
Kane has a son named Zion.

== Filmography ==
=== Film ===
Year 2000	Title	Role	Notes
2007	Katt Williams: American Hustle	Herself	Documentary
2008	Diary of a Tired Black Man	Hot Bad Girl At Bar	
2009	Brooklyn's Finest	Chantel	
2009	Blood and Bone	Chanel	
2011	S.W.A.T.: Firefight	Lori Barton	Video
2011	Madea's Big Happy Family	Kimberly	
2012	The Collection	Paz	
2014	Seasons of Love	Imani	TV movie
2014	OneA.M.	Woman	Short
2015	Tap Shoes & Violins	Madison	Short

=== Television ===
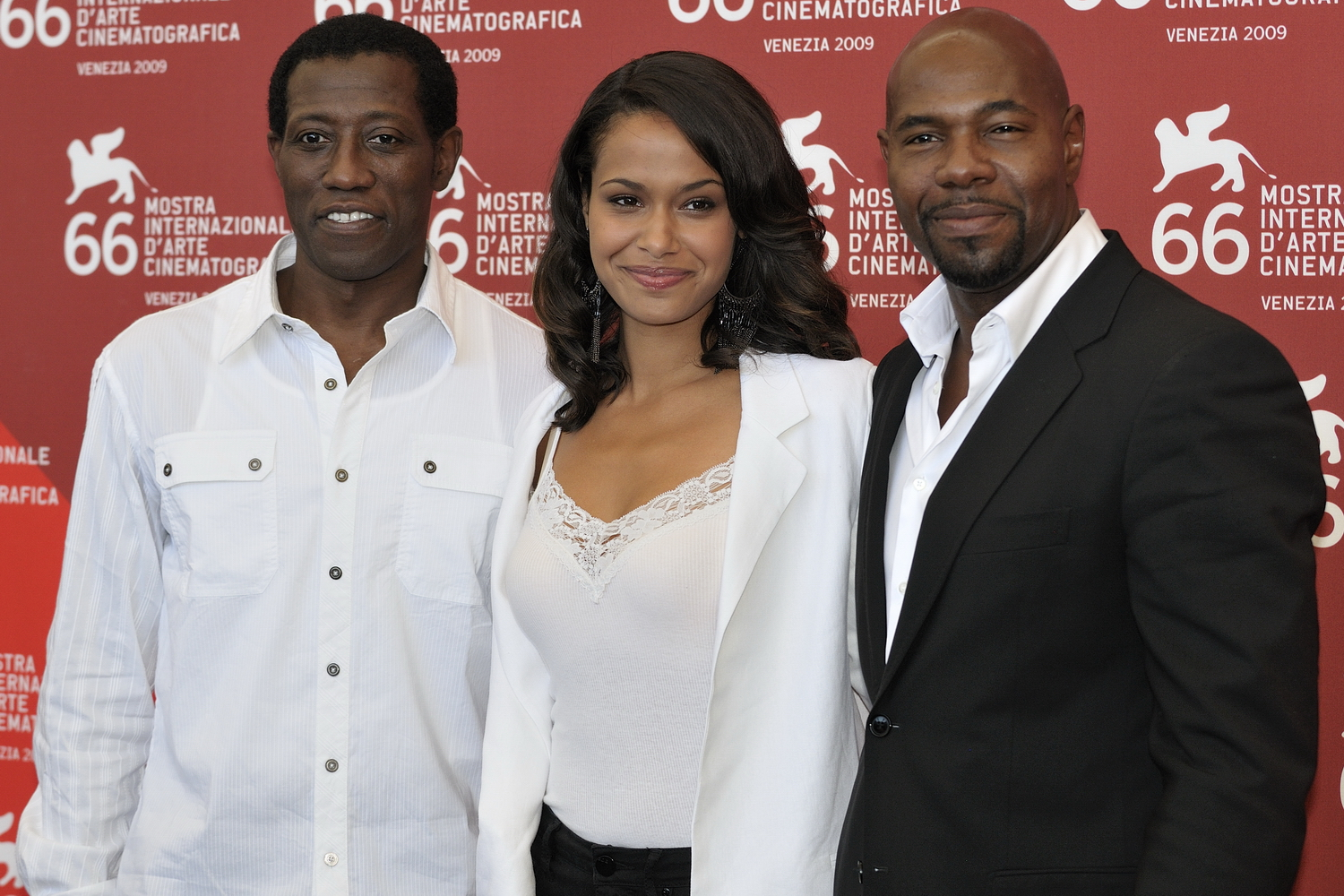
Kane and her co-stars at a photocall for Brooklyn's Finest (2009) in Paris, France.

Year	Title	Role	Notes
2006	CSI: Miami	Leslie Anderson	Episode: "Darkroom"
2007	The Young and the Restless	Monica	Episode: "Episode #1.8579"
2007	Entourage	Waitress	Episode: "The Day Fuckers"
2008–11	All My Children	Natalia Fowler	Regular Cast
2012	Hollywood Heights	Traci Madsen	Main cast
2013–14	The Originals	Sabine Laurent	Recurring cast: Season 1
2018	Code Black	Felicia Humpheries	Recurring cast: season 3
2019	American Soul	Ilsa Dejarnette	Recurring cast: season 1
2020	Terror Lake Drive	Sam	Main cast: season 1
2022-2024	Reasonable Doubt	Shanelle	Main cast: seasons 1 and 2
2021-2023	The Game	Shannon Dixon	Recurring Cast: Season 2
