= Brooklyn's Finest =

2009 film by Antoine Fuqua

- Theatrical release poster
- Directed by: Antoine Fuqua
- Written by: Michael C. Martin
- Produced by: Elie Cohn; Basil Iwanyk; John Langley; John Thompson
- Starring: Richard Gere; Don Cheadle; Ethan Hawke; Wesley Snipes; Will Patton; Lili Taylor; Brían F. O'Byrne; Shannon Kane; Ellen Barkin
- Cinematography: Patrick Murguia
- Edited by: Barbara Tulliver
- Music by: Marcelo Zarvos
- Production companies: Millennium Films; Thunder Road Pictures; Nu Image
- Distributed by: Overture Films
- Release dates: January 16, 2009 (Sundance); March 5, 2010 (United States)
- Running time: 132 minutes
- Country: United States
- Language: English
- Budget: $17 million
- Box office: $36.4 million

Brooklyn's Finest is a 2009 American crime drama film directed by Antoine Fuqua and written by Michael C. Martin. It stars Richard Gere, Don Cheadle, Ethan Hawke, and Wesley Snipes. The film premiered at the 2009 Sundance Film Festival on January 16, 2009, and was released in the United States on March 5, 2010.

== Plot ==
Detective Sal Procida shoots someone named Carlo Powers, grabs a bag of money and flees. Sal confesses the murder to a priest, asking for help with his financial situation: his wife is pregnant with twins, and they live in a moldy house too small for their four existing children.

Desperate to move, Sal arranged to purchase a larger home through a woman who owes him a favor. The down payment is due the following Tuesday, and Sal is still short. Sal, who is a New York City Police Department (NYPD) narcotics detective, has begun to steal drug money from raids.

Alcoholic, suicidal officer Eddie Dugan is a week from retirement after 22 years of unremarkable service. Despite his impending retirement, Eddie is assigned to oversee a rookie.

Officer Clarence "Tango" Butler is an undercover cop working the drug beat. Tango is tired of the kind of attention attracted by a black man in a black BMW. Having been promised a promotion including a desk job for years, Butler is finally offered detective first grade if he betrays his friend Caz Phillips, a criminal recently released from federal prison. Federal Agent Smith instructs Tango to set up a drug deal that will ensure Caz's arrest and return to prison.

Eddie's first rookie, a former Marine, becomes disgusted with Eddie's apparent cowardice and cynicism. The rookie asks to be reassigned to a new training officer but is killed on his first call. Eddie's second rookie accidentally fires his gun near a teenager's head during a petty theft investigation. The teenager goes deaf, leaving the NYPD facing a public relations nightmare. During the investigation, Eddie is remorseful for what will happen to the rookie, but refuses to twist the truth to portray the teen as a drug dealer despite encouragement by Internal Affairs investigators.

When Tango warns Caz to abort their upcoming drug deal, they are ambushed. Caz is shot under orders from Red, a gangster Tango previously humiliated. After Smith makes a racist remark and refuses to pursue Red, a furious Tango lunges at her but fellow officers restrain him.

Sal's team's latest raid is cancelled, but he goes anyway to steal the money. One of his team members, Detective Ronny Rosario, tries but fails to stop Sal from going.

Eddie retires from the NYPD. While sitting in his car contemplating suicide, Eddie sees a woman who had earlier been reported missing being shoved into a van. Eddie follows the van to the Van Dyke housing projects.

As Sal approaches, Tango enters the building, having come to kill Red. Sal breaks into the apartment and, after killing three drug dealers, discovers their cash. While pocketing the money, Sal is shot dead by a young man, who became suspicious after noticing Sal hanging around.

Tango pursues a wounded Red outside the building to kill him. Rosario mistakes him for a gangster and shoots him in the back. Only after shooting Tango does Rosario realize he shot another officer. He calls for an ambulance. Rosario leaves a wounded Tango to continue searching for Sal. Rosario witnesses the young man fleeing and is devastated when he finds Sal's dead body in the apartment.

Meanwhile, Eddie locates a sex slave dungeon in the building's basement. Eddie apprehends one of the men and is confronted by another, "Dragon". When Dragon does not comply with his orders to get on the floor, Eddie shoots him once in the chest, beginning a violent fight that ends with Eddie strangling him with a zip tie. The emergency response workers take custody of the girls and men while Eddie walks away.

== Cast ==
- Richard Gere as Officer Eddie Dugan
- Don Cheadle as Detective Clarence Butler / Tango
- Ethan Hawke as Detective Sal Procida
- Wesley Snipes as Casanova "Caz" Phillips
- Will Patton as Lieutenant Bill Hobarts
- Lili Taylor as Angela Procida
- Michael Kenneth Williams as "Red"
- Brían F. O'Byrne as Detective Ronny Rosario
- Shannon Kane as Chantel
- Ellen Barkin as FBI Agent Smith
- Wass Stevens as Detective Patrick Leary
- Logan Marshall Green as Officer Melvin Panton
- Armando Riesco as Detective George Montress
- Jesse Williams as Officer Eddie Quinlan
- Vincent D'Onofrio as Bobby "Carlo" Powers
- Thomas Jefferson Byrd as Uncle Jeb
- Wade Allain-Marcus as "C-Rayz"
- Bruce MacVittie as Father Scarpitta
- Hassan Iniko Johnson as 'Beamer'
- Jas Anderson as "K. Rock"
- Raquel Castro as Katherine
- Tobias Truvillion as Gutta
- Lela Rochon as Investigator
- Cle Shaheed Sloan as "Dragon"
- Joseph Adams as Doctor Capra
- Zaire Paige as Man Man

== Production ==
=== Filming ===
The film was filmed in the three New York City boroughs of Manhattan, Queens, and Brooklyn in July 2008. In Brooklyn, locations included Brownsville and the Van Dyke Houses. In Queens, locations included Rego Park. Michael C. Martin's script originally took place primarily in the Louis H. Pink Houses in East New York, which were near where the writer grew up.

The total budget for the film was in the $17 million range, and many of the actors took large pay cuts to make the movie. The part of Man Man, Sal's killer, was given to Zaire Paige, a gang member from the neighborhood; three months after filming, he was involved in the October 2008 murder of Lethania Garcia, for which he was sentenced to 107 years to life in prison.

=== Writing ===
Martin wrote the script for a contest. He did not win but his second prize included a subscription to the Independent Feature Project newsletter. The script continued to gain attention. Martin found an agent interested in having him write a sequel to New Jack City. He found someone interested in producing his script for Finest, for which he received $200,000.

In an interview at the time of the movie's release, Martin described development of the film:

"Jeanne O’Brien-Ebiri and Mary Viola are responsible for getting this movie made. Jeanne was the first person in the industry to read the script and she was responsible for getting me an agent and the staff job (as a staff writer on the Showtime series Sleeper Cell). And once the script was out there, it came across Mary Viola’s desk at Thunder Road Pictures as a writing sample for New Jack City 2. Mary, a native New Yorker, worked like hell to sell it to the head of Thunder Road, Basil Iwanyk. Basil was an executive on Training Day, he had a great relationship with Antoine. And once Antoine attached himself to the script, Richard Gere, Don Cheadle, Wesley Snipes, and Ethan Hawke followed. Within weeks, it received a green light."

As inspiration for the Finest script, Martin named three Italian neorealist films, Nights of Cabiria, Umberto D., and Bicycle Thieves, and two directors, Italian Vittorio De Sica, who directed Umberto and Thief among others, and American Jim Jarmusch.

In the interview, Martin identified his South Shore film teacher as Mr. Braun.

== Release ==
=== Theatrical ===
Brooklyn's Finest premiered at the Sundance Film Festival in January 2009, and was picked up by Senator Distribution with a price "in the low seven figures". Senator Distribution was not able to fund its release in 2009. The film was resold to Overture Films at the 66th Venice Film Festival in September, and was released in North America on March 5, 2010.

=== Home media ===
Brooklyn's Finest was released on DVD and Blu-ray in July 2010, and topped the United States home video charts for its first week of release ended July 11.

== Reception ==
=== Box office ===
In its debut weekend in the United States, Brooklyn's Finest opened at number two behind Alice in Wonderland with $13,350,299 in 1,936 theaters, averaging $6,896 per theater. As of September 3, 2010, the film has grossed $27,163,593 in the United States theatrically, a good result for its United States distributor Overture Films, which paid less than $3 million to acquire this film's United States rights. The film also grossed $36,440,201 in theaters worldwide, and achieved 11th place on Box Office Mojo's "Dirty Cop" genre ranking, 1973–present.

=== Critical response ===
Rotten Tomatoes reported that 44% of 153 critics gave the film a positive review, with an average rating of 5.5/10. The site's critics consensus reads: "It's appropriately gritty, and soaked in the kind of palpable tension Antoine Fuqua delivers so well, but Brooklyn's Finest suffers from the comparisons its cliched script provokes." Metacritic assigned the film a weighted average score of 43 out of 100 based on 33 critics, indicating "mixed or average" reviews. Audiences polled by CinemaScore gave the film an average grade of "C" on an A+ to F scale.

In his review for the Chicago Sun-Times, Roger Ebert gave the film three stars out of four, concluding, "The film has a basic strength in its performances and craft, but falls short of the high mark Fuqua obviously set for himself." Mick LaSalle of the San Francisco Chronicle praised the actors for "bringing dimension to these stock characters", but criticized the film for being "a melodrama about three cliches in search of a bloodbath."

A. O. Scott of The New York Times also gave the film a mixed review, stating, "the sheer charismatic force of much of the acting keeps you in the movie", but "Mr. Fuqua and Mr. Martin dig themselves into a pulpy predicament, and then find themselves unable to do anything but shoot their way out." The Los Angeles Times reviewer commented that "Brooklyn's Finest is an old style potboiler about desperate cops in dire straits that overcooks both its story and its stars."

=== Accolades ===
- BET Awards
  - Nominee, Don Cheadle - Best Actor
- Black Reel Awards
  - Nominee, Best Picture
  - Nominee, Best Ensemble
  - Nominee, Antoine Fuqua - Best Director
  - Nominee, Michael C. Martin - Best Screenplay: Original or Adapted
  - Nominee, Don Cheadle - Best Actor
  - Winner, Wesley Snipes - Best Supporting Actor

== See also ==
- List of black films of the 2010s
- List of hood films
