= Have No Fear: The Life of Pope John Paul II =

2005 American biographical TV film

- Written by: Michael Hirst; Lorenzo Minoli; Judd Parkin
- Directed by: Jeff Bleckner
- Starring: Thomas Kretschmann
- Music by: Carlo Siliotto
- Country of origin: United States
- Original language: English

Production
- Producer: Paolo Piria
- Cinematography: Roberto Benvenuti
- Editor: Benjamin A. Weissman
- Running time: 90 minutes (ABC television release) 83 minutes (Poland theatrical release)
- Production companies: Five Mile River Films; Lietuvos Kinostudija; Lithuanian Film Studio

Original release
- Network: American Broadcasting Company
- Release: December 1, 2005

Have No Fear: The Life of Pope John Paul II is a 2005 biographical television drama film centered on the life of Pope John Paul II. It was written by Michael Hirst, Lorenzo Minoli and Judd Parkin, directed by Jeff Bleckner and starred Thomas Kretschmann as Pope John Paul II.

== Plot ==
The plot of the film begins with the pope's visit to Jerusalem, a stop on his 91st trip abroad, which occurred between 20 March and 26 March 2000.

At the Western Wall, he asked God to forgive the sins of the church, before retreating alone to the Church of the Holy Sepulchre.

In flashbacks to an early age, he lost his mother and his brother Edmund. Later, he lived through the German occupation of his Polish homeland during World War II and postwar Communist Polish People's Republic. Through all these hardships, he maintained his love for Jesus of Nazareth and the Virgin Mary.

He became an ordained priest, and eventually Kraków's bishop and archbishop, where he began his fight against Communism and its oppression. On October 16, 1978, Karol Wojtyla became the 264th pope of the Roman Catholic Church, and now called himself John Paul II.

The "Polish Pope" himself made history with the third longest papacy ever. He made his triumphant papal return to Poland in June, 1979, confronted liberation theology, survived the assassination attempt on himself in 1981 by Mehmet Ali Agca (who he later forgave in 1983) and used his influence to help bring both Communist and right-wing totalitarian regimes, such as Alfredo Stroessner's dictatorship in Paraguay, to their knees. Afterwards, he expressed distress over materialism and unprincipled capitalism in his native Poland and denounced the sexual abuse of children that was brought to his attention in 2002, saying that "every sin can be forgiven, but by God, not by me".

On 2 April 2005, Pope John Paul II died.

== Cast ==
Actor/Actress	Role
Thomas Kretschmann	John Paul II
Bruno Ganz	Cardinal Wyszyński
Sebastian Knapp	Mehmet Ali Ağca
Jasper Harris	the 10-year-old Wojtyła
Ignas Survila	the 12-year-old Wojtyła
Paulius Ignatavičius	Edmund Wojtyła
Petar Goranov	Karol's father
Inga Salauskaitė	Emilia Wojtyła
Michael Klesic	Stanisław Starowiejski
Richard Rees	Wojciech Jaruzelski
Charles Kay	Paul VI
John Albasiny	Stanisław Dziwisz
Roland Oliver	Adam Stefan Sapieha
Joaquim de Almeida	Archbishop Óscar Romero
Sabrina Javor	Ginka

== Production ==
The ABC film treated the topic of Catholicism differently from some expectations. The film made no attempt to focus on the Holy Scriptures, but rather focused on the devotion of John Paul II to his faith.

Production took place in Lithuania and partly in Rome. Because Benedict XVI had already given Vatican filming rights to CBS for its portrayal of the life of Pope John Paul II, production for the film scenes which play in the Vatican were done on sets.

== Reception ==
The movie has received generally negative reviews: the platform Metacritic reports 20 professional reviews with an aggregate score of 35 out of 100.
