= The Originals season 2 =

The Originals
- Season 2
- Promotional poster
- Showrunners: Julie Plec; Michael Narducci
- Starring: Joseph Morgan; Daniel Gillies; Phoebe Tonkin; Charles Michael Davis; Leah Pipes; Danielle Campbell; Yusuf Gatewood
- No. of episodes: 22

Release
- Original network: The CW
- Original release: October 6, 2014 – May 11, 2015

Season chronology
- ← Previous; Season 1 Next → Season 3

The Originals, an American supernatural drama, was renewed for a second season by The CW on February 13, 2014 and it premiered on October 6, 2014.

== Cast ==
=== Main ===
- Joseph Morgan as Niklaus "Klaus" Mikaelson
- Daniel Gillies as Elijah Mikaelson
- Phoebe Tonkin as Hayley Marshall
- Charles Michael Davis as Marcellus "Marcel" Gerard
- Leah Pipes as Camille "Cami" O'Connell
- Danielle Campbell as Davina Claire
- Yusuf Gatewood as Vincent Griffith (possessed by Finn Mikaelson; himself) (Note: Gatewood is credited as a series regular from episode 14 to 22. From episode 1 to 13, he is credited as a guest star.)

=== Recurring ===
- Nathan Parsons as Jackson Kenner
- Colin Woodell as Aiden
- Maisie Richardson-Sellers as Eva Sinclair (possessed by Rebekah Mikaelson; herself)
- Daniel Sharman as Kaleb Westphall (possessed by Kol Mikaelson)
- Nishi Munshi as Gia
- Riley Voelkel as Freya Mikaelson
- Steven Krueger as Joshua "Josh" Rosza
- Sebastian Roché as Mikael
- Sonja Sohn as Lenore Shaw (herself; possessed by Esther)
- Chase Coleman as Oliver
- Claudia Black as Dahlia
- Natalie Dreyfuss as Cassie (possessed by Esther; herself)
- Debra Mooney as Mary Dumas
- Meg Foster as Josephine LaRue
- Kristin Erickson as Dahlia (young)
- Alice Evans as Esther
- Hayley McCarthy as Esther (young)
- Yohance Myles as Joe Dalton
- Nathaniel Buzolic as Kol Mikaelson
- Aiden Flowers as Klaus Mikaelson (young)
- Perry Cox as Elijah Mikaelson (young)
- Callie McClincy as Rebekah Mikaelson (young)
- Tanner Fontana as Nick
- Lloyd Owen as Ansel
- Elle Graham as Freya Mikaelson (young)
- Javier Carrasquillo as Kurt

=== Special guest ===
- Claire Holt as Rebekah Mikaelson
- Nina Dobrev as Tatia

=== Guest ===
- Peta Sergeant as Francesca Correa
- McCarrie McCausland as Marcel Gerard (young)
- Voltaire Council as Finn Mikaelson (teen)
- Isaiah Stratton as Mikael (young)
- Cade Weeks as Finn Mikaelson (child)
- Keri Lynn Pratt as Mary-Alice Claire
- Aleeah Rogers as Astrid Malchance
- Adam Fristoe as Ruben Morris
- Nate Lycan as Mathias
- Kinsey Kunkel as Dahlia (child)
- Morgan Hinkleman as Esther (child)
- Nina Repeta as Melinda
- Matt Felten as Hamlet
- Jonatahn Horne as Laertes
- Troy Willis as King Claudius
- Kevin Savage as Jerrick

== Episodes ==
No. overall	No. in season	Title	Directed by	Written by	Original release date	Prod. code	US viewers (millions)
23	1	"Rebirth"	Lance Anderson	Marguerite MacIntyre & Julie Plec	October 6, 2014	3J5201	1.37
It is revealed that Esther, the Mikaelson family matriarch who created the Originals, is the witch who has returned, possessing Cassie's body. She is joined by her previously-deceased sons Finn (in Vincent's body) and Kol (in Kaleb's body). Klaus, in search of the White Oak Stake, prepares for a battle with the werewolves in order to get the moonlight rings from them. Not knowing that the Stake is in his father Mikael's possession, he is able to obtain the moonlight rings when Elijah and Marcel kill the werewolves as Hayley brutally kills Francesca. Both Finn and Kol use Davina and Cami to learn what their brothers are up to, while Esther plans ahead.
24	2	"Alive and Kicking"	Jeffrey Hunt	Michelle Paradise & Michael Narducci	October 13, 2014	3J5202	1.29
Ever since she killed Francesca, Hayley has changed, and Elijah suggests to Klaus to help her out. Esther continues with her plan, as she has started making more moonlight rings to lost werewolves. Per order by Esther, Davina is attacked by a group of werewolves, and has to call for Mikael's help. Just when Elijah and Marcel arrive, they find the secret that Davina has been hiding. Hayley has her wolf pack in Klaus and Elijah's house, while Klaus has a meeting with Esther. In the end, when Esther asks Kol how Davina managed to kill all of the werewolves, Kol doesn't mention Mikael's return.
25	3	"Every Mother's Son"	Dermott Downs	Christopher Hollier	October 20, 2014	3J5203	1.27
Klaus and Elijah receive a dinner invitation from their mother. Elijah visits Marcel to find a witch named Lenora who can help them identify into whose body Esther jumps next, unfortunately. Finn has her abducted. Finn arrives the dinner and tries to understand why his younger siblings had him daggered in a coffin for 900 years. During the course of their dinner, the necklace which Esther gifted Klaus wasn't meant to protect him but to weaken him in order not break his werewolf curse. After this revelation, Esther jumps out of teenaged Cassie and the spell Lenora casts falls on her. She is identified as Esther through a mark. She tells her sons she wants to heal, not to harm them, and give them a new life. She then vanishes in a mysterious way. Haley admits she is tempted by the offer and accuses Elijah of not being caring. Elijah agrees to help Gia which is a big advantage to the other vampires including Marcel. Esther and Finn discuss plans to make their family whole again.
26	4	"Live and Let Die"	Jeffrey Hunt	Ashley Lyle & Bart Nickerson	October 27, 2014	3J5204	1.31
Knowing it's only a matter of time before Klaus comes after them, Davina hides with Mikael in her family cabin in the woods. When Hayley receives a tip Finn is recruiting young, unsuspecting teenagers in order to build a werewolf army. She enlists Elijah, Marcel and Gia to rescue the group. After Cami inadvertently lets Klaus in on Davina's whereabouts, she tags along in an attempt to truly understand the deeply rooted hatred he has for his parents. At his mother's urging, Kol seeks out Davina in order to locate the missing White Oak Stake and is caught off guard when he has a dangerous encounter at the cabin. Josh, who continues to struggle with his vampire identity, opens up to an unexpected ally. Lastly, Elijah is captured by Esther.
27	5	"Red Door"	Michael Robison	Declan de Barra & Diane Ademu-John	November 3, 2014	3J5205	1.09
In order to show Elijah her plan is what's best for him, Esther forces him to relive a time long ago when he loved a young woman named Tatia, Amara's doppelganger. With the help of Marcel and Gia, Hayley is determined to find Elijah, who has gone missing but she is torn when she discovers Klaus is also in trouble. Cami finds herself in a dangerous situation when Mikael takes her hostage to lure Klaus to him. Davina discovers who Kaleb really is. Lastly, a violent confrontation ensues when Klaus comes face-to-face with his father.
28	6	"Wheel Inside the Wheel"	Matt Hastings	Michael Russo & Michael Narducci	November 10, 2014	3J5206	1.46
Fed up with her antics, Klaus becomes agitated and demands Esther to release Elijah, whom she has captured. However, Esther reveals a few dark secrets from Klaus' past in an attempt to make him an offer he can't refuse. Oliver ends up in a dangerous situation, prompting Hayley to reconnect with Jackson, who has been living a new life out in the bayou. Cami, who still believes baby Hope's death was her fault, teams up with Marcel and Gia after she becomes suspicious of her faculty advisor Finn. In a surprising turn of events, Klaus comes face-to-face with his true father who came back from the dead. In flashbacks to Esther's past, we see why she wanted to kill Klaus' daughter Hope.
29	7	"Chasing the Devil's Tail"	Jesse Warn	Carina Adly Mackenzie & Christopher Hollier	November 17, 2014	3J5207	1.44
When Klaus discovers Elijah has been afflicted by Esther's magic, he heads to the bayou in search of an antidote, but quickly realizes he's not alone. His father helps him with finding cure for his brother and tells Klaus he knows Hope is still alive so Klaus kills him to protect her. Armed with intel gathered by Aiden, Hayley teams up with him Marcel, Cami and Josh and launches a plan to take down Vincent/Finn by exploiting his weakness, in a surprising turns of events Jackson helps them. With Esther determined to carry out her plan Finn and Kol are forced to reconsider their own strategies. Intrigued by Davina's unwavering attempts to create an unlinking spell, Kaleb/Kol lets her in on some secrets from his past and brings her to a place he frequented in 1914. Finn and Kol are kidnapped by Hayley and Marcel. Elijah wakes up.
30	8	"The Brothers That Care Forgot"	Michael Allowitz	Charlie Charbonneau & Michelle Paradise	November 24, 2014	3J5208	1.26
Rebekah, who was spent months away living a normal life with baby Hope, finds herself on the run when she realizes Esther found them. Convinced Finn and Kol would be powerful allies in his fight to take down Esther, Klaus sets a plan in motion to turn his brothers against their mother. Hayley is conflicted when she and Jackson stumble upon an ancient ritual which would get their werewolf packs out from under Esther's control, but it would require her to make a tremendous sacrifice. The ritual is about Hayley and Jackson getting married so their packs can have Hayley's hybrid powers. Rebekah is meeting with Elijah and is concerned when she notices something is off with him. Finally, Davina takes matters into her own hands by turning to dark magic so she can poison Klaus. Cami finds out Esther prepared her body for Rebekah to jump into it. Klaus talks with Rebekah about Elijah and then he and Hayley are going to visit their daughter.
31	9	"The Map of Moments"	Leslie Libman	Marguerite MacIntyre & Julie Plec	December 8, 2014	3J5209	1.41
In 1914, Kol was dating a witch called Mary Alice Claire, and taught her and her friend Astrid dark magic to use against his family using a magical object. When his family found out he betrayed them. They stole the object, put Kol in a coffin. When Rebekah found him trying to get back out, they locked Mary and Astrid in a house used by the coven to place insane witches. In present day, Kol wants Davina's help to get the object back. Hayley and Klaus find their daughter and spend time with her. Hayley and Elijah make love. Kol kisses Davina. They make a plan to stop Esther with Kol which involves making her think Rebekah wants to switch bodies. Davina tries to stop Esther using Cami's body (chosen by Finn) and place her in the body of another (chosen by Kol). Rebekah makes Esther a vampire, but finds Kol hasn't forgiven her in helping to stop him steal the object and betrays her by placing her soul in the body of a witch.
32	10	"Gonna Set Your Flag on Fire"	Rob Hardy	Ashley Lyle & Bart Nickerson	January 19, 2015	3J5210	1.52
Klaus takes Cami to the safe house. Hayley returns to the compound, and she and Jackson devise a plan to bring the vampires and werewolves together to consider a truce. However, Finn places a spell on the compound, trapping wolves and vampires together. Rebekah asks former Harvest girl Cassie for help after finding herself trapped in an insane asylum. When Rebekah doesn't come to the safe house, Elijah becomes concerned, and Klaus confronts Kol about Rebekah's whereabouts. At the end of the episode, it is revealed that the ghost who talked to Rebekah is Freya.
33	11	"Brotherhood of the Damned"	Sylvain White	Kyle Arrington & Diane Ademu-John	January 26, 2015	3J5212	1.74
Finn captures Klaus' and Elijah's spirits. In the compound, Marcel must try to calm his increasingly hungry vampires. Since Kol is trapped with the vampires, Davina has no choice but to team up with the Originals to try and save him. Hayley is conflicted when she learns that she and Jackson must participate in extreme and unconventional rituals before their wedding, which will put them both in a dangerous position.
34	12	"Sanctuary"	Matt Hastings	Declan de Barra & Michael Narducci	February 2, 2015	3J5211	1.47
Rebekah becomes intrigued about in a girl in the asylum. Hayley struggles with coming clean and is surprised by something Jackson admits. Klaus learns something and heads to confront Hayley. Vincent sets his eyes on Marcel for answers to what Klaus is hiding.
35	13	"The Devil Is Damned"	Lance Anderson	Christopher Hollier & Julie Plec	February 9, 2015	3J5213	1.22
Alpha werewolves have come to join Jackson's pack, so the power from the marriage to Hayley will also spread to them and their packs. Freya finds Finn, who has sent Marcel and Kol to collect the blood of Hayley and Klaus which will help him locate the "miracle baby" which he believes is still alive and is the big secret Klaus is keeping. However, Marcel is busy trying to keep his vampires from feeding on the Alphas and once again, Kol changes sides and helps Klaus in hope that he and his other siblings will trust him. Finn has arrived at the house where Elijah, Cami and Hope have been staying. He stumbles upon Elijah and stakes him before searching for the baby. Kol and Rebekah channel Klaus, to overload Finn with magic. Elijah wakes up moments later and goes after Finn, determined to save Hope. Finn is overloaded with magic and loses his extra power before Elijah makes the house (which is filled with gas) explode. The episode ends with a glimpse at baby Hope, alluding to her possible powers.
36	14	"I Love You, Goodbye"	Matt Hastings	Carina Adly MacKenzie & Michael Narducci	February 16, 2015	3J5214	1.44
Cami rushes away from the house and stops at a payphone where Elijah meets her and Hope. Klaus offers his house for the location of Jackson and Hayley's wedding. Just before the wedding Elijah and Cami arrive at the house and Hope is reunited with her parents. Hayley doesn't want Elijah to change her mind about the wedding and she goes on to marry Jackson. During the reception, Klaus makes a toast inviting the newlyweds to live in the house. Elijah thinks Klaus dislikes Jackson as he will end up being a better father figure than he is, and Klaus thinks Elijah wants Jackson dead because he is in love with Hayley. Elijah tells Hayley he may move out. Aiden and Josh are comfortable together and Kol and Davina complete the dagger they have been working on. Freya raises Finn back from the dead. The episode ends with Elijah, Rebekah, Klaus and Davina surrounding Kol as he dies, and Rebekah promising to resurrect him.
37	15	"They All Asked for You"	Chris Grismer	Michelle Paradise	March 9, 2015	3J5215	1.40
Rebekah aligns with Marcel when she encounters a coven of vengeful witches and discovers the body she is currently inhabiting has a checkered past. Elijah contacts a respected elder witch to help Rebekah. Klaus clashes with Hayley and Jackson over how to protect baby Hope from Finn. Freya convinces Finn to bring her to Mikael, the father she hasn't seen in over a thousand years.
38	16	"Save My Soul"	Kellie Cyrus	Michael Russo	March 16, 2015	3J5216	1.25
Dahlia gives Freya a portion to consume so she can stay young, beautiful and powerful. Klaus invites Freya to the compound to gain more insight into her past with Dahlia. Rebekah begins to realize the body she is inhabiting is trying to regain control. Ms. LaRue comes to take Eva Sinclair away after she killed two young children the night before. Rebekah goes to seek help from Davina to fix her nightmares. Davina is studying to bring Kol back since he died and claims Rebekah must help her as she promised. Dahlia has been bound to Freya since Freya was still little. They became immortal and impervious to harm. Jackson becomes frustrated when Aiden questions his leadership skills. Klaus still does not trust Freya as she still appears to be an outsider. He refuses to accept her as sister. It is revealed Dahlia killed Mathias, the father of her unborn child, and Freya killed herself out of grief. Freya came back to life but the baby died as only Freya was immortal. Marcel turns to Vincent for help to save Rebekah.
39	17	"Exquisite Corpse"	Dermott Downs	Declan de Barra & Diane Ademu-John	April 6, 2015	3J5217	1.12
Eva Sinclair's reemergence leaves Rebekah trapped and tries to get close to Hope. So, Klaus puts aside his mistrust for Freya to save Rebekah's life. Hayley and Elijah learn more about Eva's violent past. Klaus introduces Freya to Esther. Eva claims all the children is asleep but not dead. Klaus tells Esther Hope is alive and need the spell to put Rebekah back in her body. Marcel turns to Vincent for help to take down Eva, but his plan takes an unexpected turn. After telling the plans, Freya kills Esther.
40	18	"Night Has a Thousand Eyes"	Jesse Warn	Ashley Lyle & Bart Nickerson	April 13, 2015	3J5218	1.01
Klaus comes face-to-face with a deadly threat when he tries to vanquish Dahlia. Elijah and Marcel prepare a safe house in Algiers with help from Josephine. Jackson approaches Hayley with a risky idea; and Aiden becomes torn between his loyalty to Jackson and his secret alliance with Klaus.
41	19	"When the Levee Breaks"	Bethany Rooney	Marguerite MacIntyre	April 20, 2015	3J5219	1.30
Dahlia gives Klaus and Hayley a deadline for turning over baby Hope, and they each devise dangerous plans in their fight against her. Freya gives Rebekah and Elijah an ultimatum. Marcel considers how to best deal with Klaus' erratic behavior.
42	20	"City Beneath the Sea"	Leslie Libman	Carina Adly MacKenzie & Charlie Charbonneau	April 27, 2015	3J5220	1.20
Dahlia reveals to Klaus some startling details about baby Hope and makes him an enticing proposition. Elijah and Freya come up with opposing ideas on how to handle Dahlia's looming deadline. Vincent approaches Davina with an intriguing offer; and Hayley makes a difficult decision about her and Hope's future.
43	21	"Fire with Fire"	David Straiton	Michael Narducci	May 4, 2015	3J5221	1.14
Klaus vows revenge when he learns he's been betrayed by his own siblings. Elijah, Rebekah and Freya try to take down Dahlia. Hayley tries to escape through the flooded bayou. Davina considers an offer that would bring back Kol. Marcel faces a new threat.
44	22	"Ashes to Ashes"	Matt Hastings	Christopher Hollier & Diane Ademu-John	May 11, 2015	3J5222	1.19
Season 2 ends with tensions between the Mikaelson siblings coming to a head. Elijah and Rebekah reconsider their plan of attack against Dahlia; Davina gets a step closer to fulfilling her promise to Kol; and Vincent is torn between prospects of a magic-free life away from New Orleans and a personal obligation to protect Davina.
