= Eye Spy (Agents of S.H.I.E.L.D.) =

- Agents of S.H.I.E.L.D. episode
- Episode no.: Season 1 Episode 4
- Directed by: Roxann Dawson
- Written by: Jeffrey Bell
- Cinematography by: Feliks Parnell
- Editing by: Debby Germino
- Original air date: October 15, 2013
- Running time: 43 minutes

Guest appearance
- Pascale Armand as Akela Amador

Episode chronology
| ← Previous "The Asset" | Next → "Girl in the Flower Dress" |
- Agents of S.H.I.E.L.D. season 1

"Eye Spy" is the fourth episode of the first season of the American television series Agents of S.H.I.E.L.D. Based on the Marvel Comics organization S.H.I.E.L.D., it follows Phil Coulson and his team of S.H.I.E.L.D. agents as they investigate a series of diamond thefts committed by a former S.H.I.E.L.D. agent. It is set in the Marvel Cinematic Universe (MCU) and acknowledges the franchise's films. The episode was written by co-showrunner Jeffrey Bell and directed by Roxann Dawson.

Clark Gregg reprises his role as Coulson from the film series, starring alongside Ming-Na Wen, Brett Dalton, Chloe Bennet, Iain De Caestecker, and Elizabeth Henstridge. Theatrical actress Pascale Armand won the guest role of the former agent, Akela Amador, who received her own musical theme from composer Bear McCreary consisting of a musical representation of her name. In general, the music for the episode was expanded from earlier scores for the series. Filming for the episode took place in Los Angeles, as well as on location in Stockholm, Sweden for the episode's opening sequence.

"Eye Spy" originally aired on ABC on October 15, 2013, and as watched by 11.60 million viewers within a week. The episode received a mostly positive critical response, with Armand's performance praised.

== Plot ==
In Stockholm, Sweden, a group of identically dressed masked men, each handcuffed to a briefcase, are attacked in a subway. They are all killed, with one also having his hand cut off, and his briefcase taken. The attacker opens the briefcase and removes the box of diamonds it contains. Investigating the attack, Agent Phil Coulson discovers that the briefcases were randomly assigned, so no one knew which contained the diamonds, and that the attacker carried it out with her eyes closed. Civilian recruit and S.H.I.E.L.D. trainee Skye believes that extrasensory perception may be involved, but Coulson and Agent Melinda May doubt that such abilities exist. Using social media, the team discovers that the thief, who has been behind several other similar crimes, is former S.H.I.E.L.D. agent Akela Amador. Coulson had trained Amador, and until now had believed her dead after she led a failed attack on one of Mr. Vanchat's gulags.

In Zloda, Belarus, Amador uses the diamonds as payment for a proxcard to access the Todorov Building in Minsk. The team tracks her there, but Amador escapes. Skye and Agents Leo Fitz and Jemma Simmons discover a strange video feed linked to Amador, which they soon discover to be coming from a camera in her eye, the source of her apparent "powers". Seeing the name of the hotel where Amador is through the feed, May tracks her down and confronts her. Amador reveals that her prosthetic eye contains a failsafe so her handler, who relays orders via text through the eye, can kill her if she refuses to complete her missions. The two fight until Coulson arrives and stuns Amador. Skye hijacks the feed and relays it through a pair of glasses that Agent Grant Ward wears, carrying out Amador's mission while Agents Fitz and Simmons remove the prosthetic eye.

Ward finds Amador's target: a mysterious diagram in a room of the Todorov Building. Coulson tracks down Amador's handler, who is instantly killed by his own prosthetic eye. Now wearing an eyepatch, Amador is taken into S.H.I.E.L.D. custody. Though Coulson promises to testify for her, she is just happy to be free.

== Production ==
=== Development ===
Marvel Television announced in September 2013 that the fourth episode of the series Agents of S.H.I.E.L.D. was titled "Eye Spy", and had been written by co-showrunner Jeffrey Bell, with Roxann Dawson directing.

=== Casting ===
Marvel confirmed that the episode would star main cast members Clark Gregg as Phil Coulson, Ming-Na Wen as Melinda May, Brett Dalton as Grant Ward, Chloe Bennet as Skye, Iain De Caestecker as Leo Fitz, and Elizabeth Henstridge as Jemma Simmons.

Theatrical actress Pascale Armand got the role of Akela Amador a week after auditioning, and received the episode's script the night before traveling to Los Angeles. In preparation for the role, Armand watched The Avengers (2012), and took gym classes. About working on the show, Armand said "The pressure is always on for me to do my best work, no matter what I do. That's just who I am. It started to seep in just how big this show was while I was working on the set, when I went to Stockholm, Sweden and coming back home to [New York City]. Everyone was talking about the show and there were posters everywhere advertising it [...] It was my first time on a set that big, having such a sizable role."

=== Filming and visual effects ===
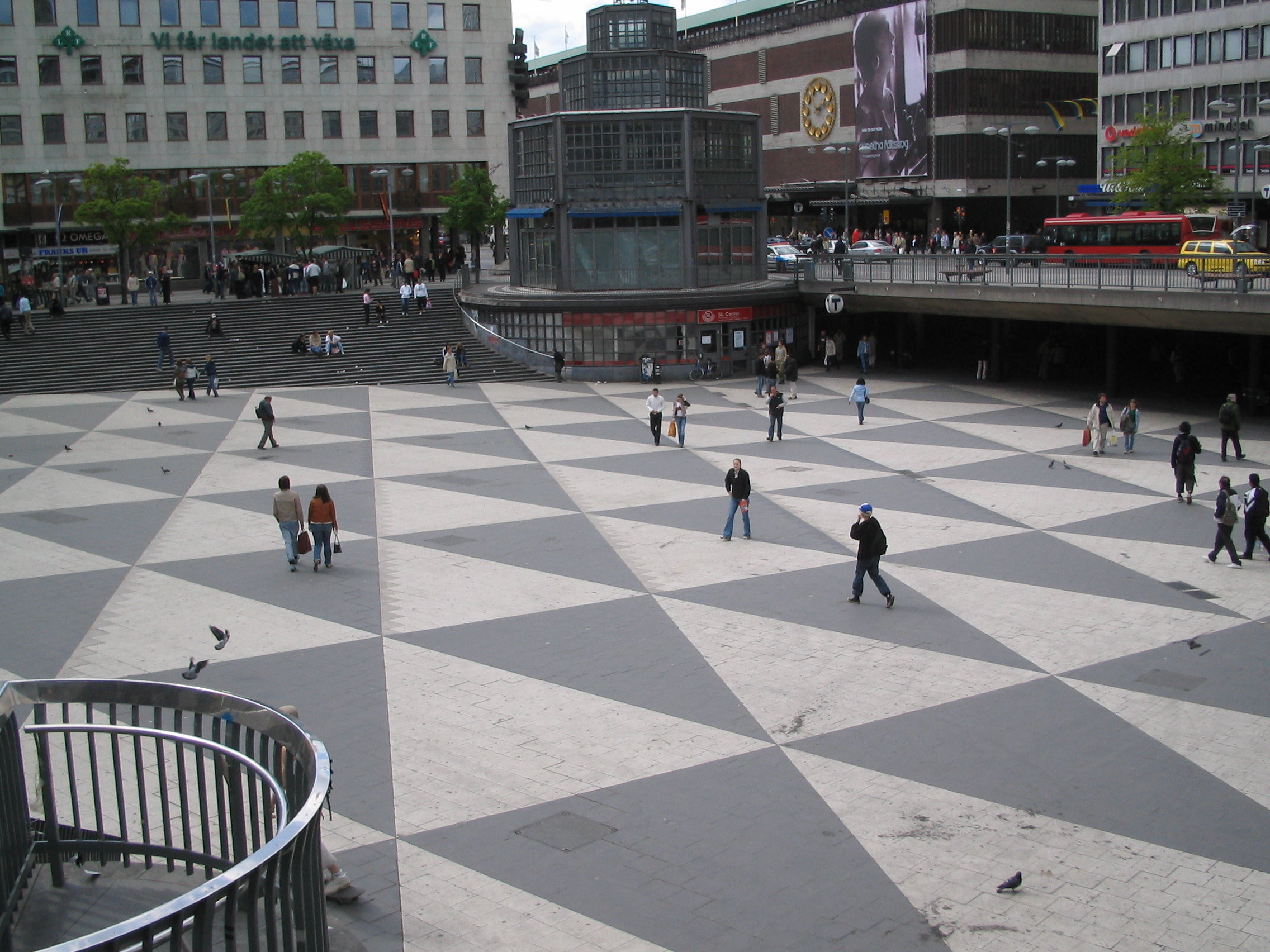
Location filming for the opening sequence took place in Stockholm, including at Sergel's Square

Filming occurred from August 20 to 29, 2013. Like the rest of the series, the majority of the episode was filmed in Los Angeles, such as on the Universal Studios backlot and at Golden Oak Ranch, but the opening sequence was filmed on location in Stockholm, Sweden, including at Sergel's Square. The Sweden filming was directed by the series' second unit director Garry A. Brown. Armand filmed her scenes in Los Angeles initially and returned to New York, before flying to Sweden for those scenes, in mid-September 2013. Replicas of the Sweden train and station were created in Los Angeles using a New York City subway car and digital set extensions.

External image
- Images of the actors in the red Morphsuits to create the backscatter imagery, from Mark Kolpack's Twitter

To create Amador's backscatter X-ray imagery, visual effects supervisor Mark Kolpack learned through research that people would look "white and doughy with no features", with clothing appearing as an outline or transparent. He asked costume designer Ann Foley to create the costumes out of clear plastic, for the actors to wear over red Morphsuits. By inverting what was filmed with the actors in these outfits, Kolpack was able to create the backscatter effect.

=== Music ===
Composer Bear McCreary called his expanded use of the orchestra in the episode "the real star of this score", and noted that when executive producer and writer Jeffrey Bell heard an early version of it, he compared it to the work of Bernard Hermann. McCreary highlighted the opening and climactic action cues as striking the "perfect" balance between "contemporary instrumentation and traditional scoring". The episode saw several variations of the series' main theme played, including triumphantly when "Ward blasts his way out of the building", with trumpets and French horns offering "soaring statements" of it; and in a "bouncy little statement", for which trumpet player Malcolm McNab used a broken harmon mute that "rattles and buzzes like nothing I've ever heard". The "Agents Theme", first introduced in "0-8-4", was also used "at the end of the episode, [when] Coulson and Skye find a moment of [peace] and unwind [...] this theme always represents the emotional bond between our protagonists", and so was more appropriate for the scene than McCreary's themes for Coulson and Skye. McCreary "stripped out all the guitars and percussion from the first version we heard and arranged it solely for con sord strings and a few woodwinds."

Bear McCreary's theme for Akela Amador, a musical representation of her name

For the episode, McCreary composed a theme for the character of Akela Amador, a musical representation of her name with the notes arranged "so that the syllables in her name land with the right emphasis. The melody basically suggests that you sing along with her name [...] I also put two of the A's and the D in Akela Amador's name on those exact notes [...] Starting with this association with her name was a fun way to kickstart my creative process, and it also produced a malleable melody that could be adapted to my needs throughout the episode." The theme is initially used with low strings or brass to sound ominous, or even evil, but when she "reunites with Coulson for an emotional conversation, the strings repeat her theme in twisting, circular statements, adding angst and heartbreak."

== Release ==
=== Broadcast ===
"Eye Spy" was first aired in the United States on ABC on October 15, 2013, after first screening early at the New York Comic Con on October 12, 2013. It was aired alongside the US broadcast in Canada on CTV, while it was first aired in the United Kingdom on Channel 4 on October 18, 2013. It premiered on the Seven Network in Australia on October 16, 2013.

=== Home media ===
The episode, along with the rest of Agents of S.H.I.E.L.D.'s first season, was released on Blu-ray and DVD on September 9, 2014. Bonus features include behind-the-scenes featurettes, audio commentary, deleted scenes, and a blooper reel. On November 20, 2014, the episode became available for streaming on Netflix. The episode, along with the rest of the series, was removed from Netflix on February 28, 2022, and later became available on Disney+ on March 16, 2022.

== Reception ==
=== Ratings ===
In the United States the episode received a 2.8/8 percent share among adults between the ages of 18 and 49, meaning that it was seen by 2.8 percent of all households, and 8 percent of all of those watching television at the time of the broadcast. It was watched by 7.85 million viewers. The Canadian broadcast gained 1.78 million viewers, the third highest for that day and the eleventh highest for the week. The United Kingdom premiere had 2.38 million viewers and in Australia, the premiere had 1.05 million viewers, including 0.9 million timeshifted viewers. Within a week of its release, the episode was watched by 11.60 million U.S. viewers, above the season average of 8.31.

=== Critical response ===
Oliver Sava of The A.V. Club graded the episode a "B+", feeling that the series was "getting better with each new episode, and now that it's been picked up for a full season, I'm genuinely excited to see where the show goes from here. "Eye Spy" is a big step in the right direction, delving further into the history of these characters while laying groundwork for future stories. S.H.I.E.L.D. doesn't need superheroes to be a captivating TV series, and making sure the human elements are developed is the best way to guarantee the show's success." He felt that Armand "does impressive work depicting the mental toll of Akela's experience, and her intensity early in the episode makes for a poignant final moment when she lays down in her prison cell, finally at peace after years of torment." Eric Goldman of IGN scored the episode 7.9 out of 10, praising the "darker and edgier elements" of the episode, the Akela and May fight, and Ward's storyline, pointing out that "some viewers have found [Ward] to be dull. I actually quite enjoyed Ward's material in the pilot, and this episode was an especially nice spotlight for him [...] He got some nice action beats along the way and one of the funnier moments of the episode". He did, however, criticize the fact that half of the team members are unready for combat, stating "3 out of 6 team members being unready for combat is 2 too many."

Will Salmon at SFX scored the episode 3.5 stars out of 5, feeling that "The 'agent gone bad' is a hackneyed trope, but this works, largely because of Pascale Armand's strong, understated performance" and praising the opening sequence as being "wonderfully eerie", comparing it positively to Doctor Who and The Avengers. Graeme Virtue at The Guardian praised the more focused, personal stakes of the episode, noting that "it's easier to cheer for scrappy underdogs than a huge, militarised Big Brother organisation like SHIELD", as well as Grant Ward's storyline, but criticized the episode's use of Bear McCreary's score, calling it "backgrounded". Marc Bernardin of The Hollywood Reporter praised the episode for its much more realistic (compared to previous episodes) familial environment, complete with tension, as well as the character of Akela Amador and the fact that "Agent Coulson was at the center of the action, where he belongs". Den of Geek's James Hunt surmised that the series "is definitely getting better and that's the main thing to take away from this episode. At this rate it should actually be quite good (rather than forgivably average) by Christmas. Let's hope the viewers last that long." Jim Steranko, known for his work on Nick Fury, Agent of S.H.I.E.L.D., felt the episode "had an overall cohesion not previously in evidence", but criticized it as unambitious, noting that "stripping the Marvel concept to its visual minimum makes little sense".
