= Prom (soundtrack) =

Prom (Original Motion Picture Soundtrack)

Soundtrack album by various artists
- Released: April 26, 2011
- Genre: Pop; dance-pop; jazz; rhythm and blues; electronic dance music
- Length: 48:45
- Label: Hollywood
- Producer: Mitchell Leib; Joe Bussbaum

Singles from Prom (Original Motion Picture Soundtrack)
- 1. "Not Your Birthday" Released: March 22, 2011; 2. "Prettiest Thing" Released: March 30, 2011; 3. "Your Surrender (Remix version)" Released: April 6, 2011

Prom (Original Motion Picture Soundtrack) is the soundtrack to the 2011 film of the same name. The album was released by Hollywood Records on April 26, 2011, featuring several pop tracks, performed by an assortment of artists including Neon Trees, Travie McCoy, Allstar Weekend, Passion Pit, Oh Darling, Girl in a Coma, Those Dancing Days, Nolan Sotillo amongst others. The soundtrack was promoted heavily weeks prior to the film's release, with three singles leading the album.

== Background ==
The soundtrack to the film was intended to serve as a marketing tool for driving the younger demographic (of age 15–25) audiences to theatres. Though, Prom was not a musical unlike the High School Musical franchise, the soundtrack featured throwaway hits of pop singles that were potential chart-toppers.

In a March 2011 interview to Billboard, vice president of Disney Music Group, Rob Souriall commented that "Tweens move so quickly now, getting so much information virally [...] You used to have to beat kids over the head with a message for nine months and now that’s too long. The new strategies are shorter windows and more focused."

== Singles ==
Allstar Weekend performed the track "Not Your Birthday" which was released as the first of the two singles was released March 22, 2011. This would be later included in their 2011 studio album All the Way. Christin Maher of PopCrush wrote that "The pop song has a touch of rock 'n' roll, and also gets some hip-hop flair". "Prettiest Thing" by Oh Darling was released as the second single on the album on March 30. A remixed version of Neon Trees' song "Your Surrender" by JD Walker was released on April 6.

== Music video ==
Music videos for "Not Your Birthday" and "Prettiest Thing" released on the same date of the single. The film version of "Your Surrender" directed by Paul "Coy" Allen was released on April 6, featuring the cast members Aimee Teegarden, Thomas McDonell, Janelle Ortiz and Nicholas Braun.

== Promotion and release ==
Thirty-second clips of "Not Your Birthday" and "Prettiest Thing" were unveiled with the team asking fans to create their own videos with their songs and stills from the film through "Prom Music Slideshow" featured in Disney's official website, as a part of the Prom contest.

== Track listing ==
| No. | Title | Artist(s) | Length |
|---|---|---|---|
| 1. | "I'll Be Yours" | Those Dancing Days | 3:22 |
| 2. | "Your Surrender" (Remix) | Neon Trees | 4:15 |
| 3. | "We'll Be Alright" | Travie McCoy | 3:18 |
| 4. | "Not Your Birthday" (Prom version) | Allstar Weekend | 3:25 |
| 5. | "Time Stand" | Moon | 3:04 |
| 6. | "Dreams" | Passion Pit | 4:18 |
| 7. | "Please Speak Well Of Me" | The Weepies | 2:33 |
| 8. | "We Could Be Anything" | Nolan Sotillo | 4:11 |
| 9. | "In Deep" | Shere | 3:18 |
| 10. | "Prettiest Thing" | Oh Darling | 3:20 |
| 11. | "Can't Keep My Hands Off You" | Simple Plan | 3:20 |
| 12. | "Come On, Let's Go" | Girl in a Coma | 2:06 |
| 13. | "Almost There" | Opus Orange feat. Lauren Hillman | 2:12 |
| 14. | "Impossible" | Shout Out Louds | 3:51 |
| 15. | "Stick Hippo" | Stick Hippo | 2:12 |
| Total length: | | | 48:45 |

== Reception ==
James Christopher Monger of AllMusic called it as "a playlist that leans heavily on angst-fueled emo-pop, quirky indie rock, and likeable, vapid punk-pop, all of which dutifully reflect the dizzying, cruel, innocent, and self-absorbed world of high school, or more specifically, the nervy lead up to the polarizing, annual formal dance that falls near the end of junior and/or senior year. Predictable, but mostly enjoyable, Prom plays it safe with by-the-numbers, that successfully convey a long night filled with awkward, memorable moments, first and last kisses, confetti, laughter, and tears."

== Charts ==
| Chart (2011) | Peak position |
|---|---|
| US Soundtrack Albums (Billboard) | 7 |

== Credits ==
- Joe Bussbaum – executive soundtrack producer
- JP Clark – vocal producer
- Ted Griffin – executive soundtrack producer
- Jaycen Joshua – mixing
- Manny Marroquin – mixing
- Glen Lajeski – marketing
- Mitchell Leib – executive in charge of music, soundtrack producer
- Justin Springer – executive soundtrack producer
- Jojo Villaneuva – music supervisor
