= Danielle Campbell =

American actress (born 1995)

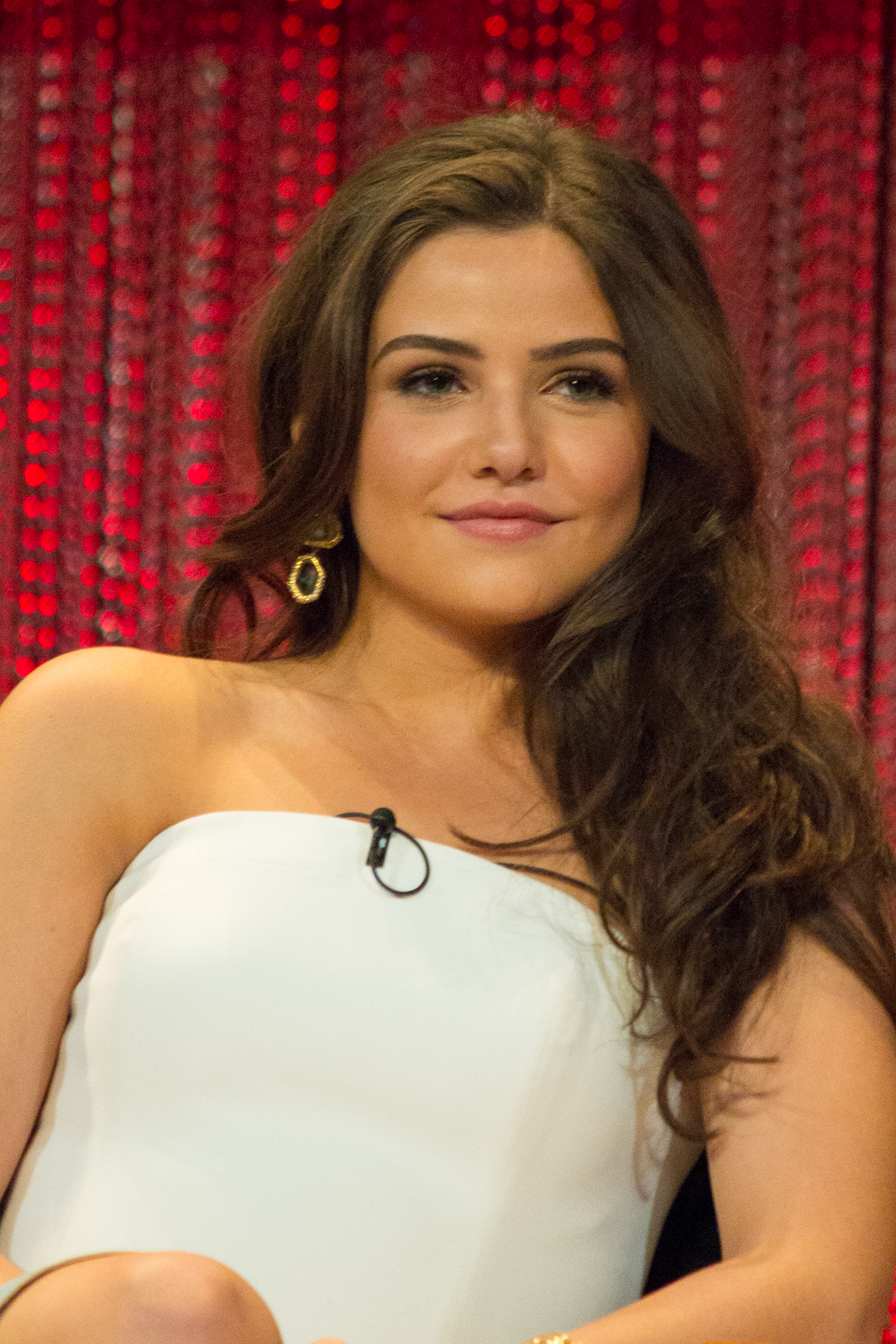
- Campbell at PaleyFest in 2014 for The Originals
- Born: January 30, 1995 (age 31); Hinsdale, Illinois, U.S.
- Occupation: Actress
- Years active: 2004–present
- Notable work: The Originals; Tell Me a Story
- Spouse: Colin Woodell (m. 2025)

Danielle Marie Campbell (born January 30, 1995) is an American actress. She is known for her starring roles as Jessica Olson in the 2010 Disney Channel Original Movie Starstruck, Simone Daniels in the 2011 Disney film Prom, Davina Claire in the 2013 CW television drama series The Originals and Kayla Powell and Olivia Moon in the 2018 CBS All Access television psychological thriller series Tell Me a Story.

== Early life ==
Campbell is from Hinsdale, Illinois. Her parents are Georganne and John Campbell, and she has a younger brother. She was discovered in a hair salon in Chicago at age ten.

== Career ==
Campbell's first acting role was as a guest star in five episodes of Prison Break. She also appeared in a nationwide commercial for Build-A-Bear Workshop and played the character of Darla in the 2008 movie The Poker House. In 2010, she appeared in the Disney Channel television series Zeke and Luther as Dani, before starring in the television movie Starstruck with Sterling Knight the same year. Upon Starstruck's release, she signed a development deal with Disney. She starred in the movie Prom, released on April 29, 2011, co-starring with Nicholas Braun, Nolan Sotillo, and Aimee Teegarden.

In 2013, she was cast in a starring role on the television series The Originals as a powerful sixteen-year-old witch named Davina. In late 2013, producers of the 2015 film 16 South announced that Campbell would star in the film alongside Luke Benward. In April 2015, Campbell shot the movie Race To Redemption in which she starred alongside Aiden Flowers and Luke Perry; the movie was released in 2016. Campbell was also cast as Ellie Reed in the 2016 television series SINs, and Maddy in the 2017 Fine Brothers production F the Prom. In March 2018, she appeared in the music video for "Better With You" by Jesse McCartney.

In 2018, Campbell had a recurring role in the second season of the Freeform television series Famous in Love. In June 2018 she was cast in a starring role in the CBS All Access television drama series Tell Me a Story. In 2021, Campbell starred in the Broadway production of Alice Childress's Trouble in Mind.

In 2025, she starred in the Netflix series The Waterfront.

== Personal life ==
Campbell lives in Los Angeles, California. Campbell was in a relationship with singer Louis Tomlinson from November 2015 to December 2016. In February 2018, she started dating longtime friend and former The Originals co-star Colin Woodell; they became engaged in August 2023, after five years of dating. The pair married in Biarritz, France on September 13, 2025.

== Filmography ==
Film roles
| Year | Title | Role | Notes |
|---|---|---|---|
| 2008 | The Poker House | Darla | |
| 2011 | Prom | Simone Daniels | |
| 2012 | Madea's Witness Protection | Cindy Needleman | |
| 2016 | Race to Redemption | Hannah Rhodes | |
| 2017 | F the Prom | Maddy Datner | Direct-to-video film |
| 2018 | Ghost Light | Juliet | |
| 2018 | Shrimp | Jess' date | Short film |
| 2019 | Being Frank | Allison | |
| 2023 | Share? | #038491828 | |

Television roles
| Year | Title | Role | Notes |
|---|---|---|---|
| 2006–2007 | Prison Break | Gracey Hollander | 4 episodes |
| 2010 | Zeke and Luther | Dani | Episode: "Double Crush" |
| 2010 | Starstruck | Jessica Olson | Disney Channel Original Movie |
| 2012 | Drop Dead Diva | Carla Middlen | Episode: "Family Matters" |
| 2013–2018 | The Originals | Davina Claire | Main role (seasons 1–3); special guest star (seasons 4–5) |
| 2017 | Hell's Kitchen | Herself | Guest diner/Stand Up To Cancer contributor; Episode: "Aerial Maneuvers" |
| 2017–2018 | Runaways | Eiffel | Recurring role; 6 episodes |
| 2018 | Famous in Love | Harper Tate | Recurring role; 9 episodes |
| 2018 | All American | Hadley | Episode: "Pilot" |
| 2018–2020 | Tell Me a Story | Kayla Powell / Olivia Moon | Main role |
| 2024–2025 | The Rookie | Blair London | Recurring role |
| 2025 | The Waterfront | Peyton Buckley | Main role |

Music videos
| Year | Title | Artist | Role |
|---|---|---|---|
| 2018 | "Better With You" | Jesse McCartney | Love interest |
