= List of legacy sequel =

A legacy sequel is a work that follows the continuity of the original works, but takes place much further along the timeline, often focusing on new characters with the elderly original characters still present in the plot.

== Films ==
| Original | Legacy sequel | Legacy |
|---|---|---|
| The Texas Chain Saw Massacre (1974) | Texas Chainsaw Massacre (2022 film) | The original characters Sally Hardesty and Leatherface return, but with different actors. Larroquette reprises his role as the film's narrator. |
| Scream (1996 film) | Scream (2022 film) | Campbell, Cox, Arquette, Ulrich and Jackson reprising their roles from original film. |
| The Exorcist (1973) | The Exorcist: Believer | Ellen Burstyn and Linda Blair reprise their roles from the original film. |
| I Know What You Did Last Summer (1997) | I Know What You Did Last Summer (2025 film) | Hewitt, Prinze Jr. and Gellar reprising their roles from original film. |
| Scary Movie (2000) | Scary Movie (2026 film) | Faris, Hall, M. Wayans, S. Wayans, Sheridan, Munro, Oteri and Abrahams reprising their roles from original film. |

== TV Series ==
| Original | Legacy sequel | Legacy |
|---|---|---|
| Chucky (franchise) (1988) | Chucky (TV series) | B. Dourif, Vincent, Elise, Tilly, F. Dourif and Boyd reprising their roles from franchise film. |
| Gossip Girl (2007) | Gossip Girl (2021 TV series) | Bell, Trachtenberg, Colin, Szadkowski, Chang, Schwartz, Shawn and Doyle reprising their roles from original series. |
| Pretty Little Liars (2010) | Pretty Little Liars (2022 TV series) | Gish reprisin his role from the original series. |

In producction.
