= Allstar Weekend =

American pop rock band (2008–2013)

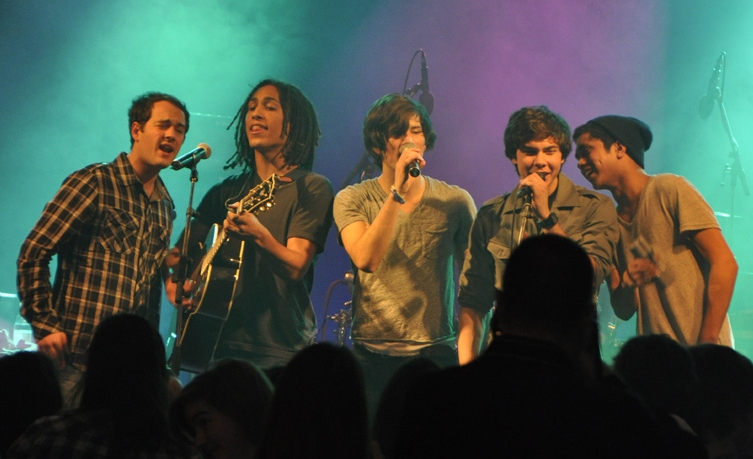
- Allstar Weekend performing during the Glamour Kills Tour in 2011

Background information
- Also known as: Allstar; ASW; AW; A-Dub (various spellings)
- Origin: Poway, California, United States
- Genres: Pop rock; pop punk; electronica; power pop
- Years active: 2008–2013
- Labels: Hollywood (2009–2012); Universal (2012–2013); Diggit (2012–2013)
- Past members: Zachary "Zach" Porter; Cameron Quiseng; Michael Martinez; Tom Norris; Nathan Darmody

Allstar Weekend was an American pop rock band based in Poway, California. The band gained its popularity from MySpace and then the Disney Channel television network. The band consisted of lead singer Zachary "Zach" Porter, bassist Cameron Quiseng, drummer Michael Martinez, and lead guitarist Nathan Darmody. In September 2011, Darmody left the band and later pursued his solo career. They were best known for the singles "Dance Forever", "Come Down with Love", and "A Different Side of Me". They disbanded on August 4, 2013.

Their debut album Suddenly Yours was released in October 2010 and peaked at number 197 on the Billboard 200. In September 2011, Zach, Cameron, and Michael released their second studio album entitled All the Way. All the Way peaked at 49 on the Billboard 200, a considerable improvement from their first album.

== History ==
=== 2007–2010: Formation and rise to fame ===
After meeting in a geology class at Poway High School, Nathan Darmody and Tom Norris began to write music together in the spring of 2007. Darmody's friend Zachary "Zach" Porter later joined their band and the three formed 'Outerspace Politicians' in June 2007. The band wrote and recorded early demos in Darmody's bedroom in the ensuing months using FL Studio. Several completed songs were then posted to the group's Myspace page. This resulted in little attention, although it prompted local drummer Michael Martinez to contact the band and audition to join. In an effort to begin practicing live, Porter recruited friend Cameron Quiseng (pronounced /ˈkiːsɛŋ/). At Darmody's suggestion, Quiseng - whom Porter met in middle school - became bassist, while Porter switched to lead vocals. Shortly before signing with Hollywood Records, Norris left the band to pursue college, and is still credited with writing "Clock Runs Out", "A Different Side Of Me", "Here With You", "Journey To the End Of My Life", and "Dance Forever".

The band first rose to fame when they were contestants on Radio Disney's special, Next Big Thing or N.B.T., under their former name, 'ALLSTAR'. Despite being a fan favorite, the band lost, coming second to Jonnie and Brookie. A few months later, the band signed a contract with Hollywood Records- and uploaded the video of them signing on August 29, 2009, to their official YouTube - and immediately began work on their debut EP, Suddenly.

Prior to becoming contestants on Radio Disney's Next Big Thing, they contributed songs (one of which was an early, more synthesized version of "Dance Forever") as part of a digital split album titled Chicken Finger Fingers on Drive-Thru Records with Dino Club. Soon after, they signed with Hollywood Records and released their debut extended play, Suddenly. After signing with Hollywood Records, the band changed their name from ALLSTAR to Allstar Weekend, citing legal issues as the catalyst. The band has said in interviews that they chose to add 'Weekend' because they felt it made a better connection with their fans.

=== 2010–2011: Suddenly Yours and other projects ===
On March 13, 2010, the band released their debut single, "A Different Side of Me", for digital download and radio airplay. The song peaked at the top of Radio Disney singles chart.

Allstar Weekend was one of many bands who recorded remakes of popular Disney songs on the compilation album, Disneymania 7, which was released on April 17, 2010. The band recorded their version of "I Just Can't Wait to Be King" from The Lion King. Shortly after the release of their debut single, the band announced their debut EP, Suddenly, would be released on June 17, 2010. They also announced plans to release a second single before the release of the album.

On June 7, 2010, the band released "Dance Forever", the second single from their EP. The music video was released June 12, 2010, and takes place in the backyard of a house where a pool party is being thrown and the band is performing. Porter and Darmody have said that the "Dance Forever" video represents not just one, but all the members of the band's personalities. The song debuted on Billboard's Heatseekers Chart at number 16. It peaked at number 45 on the Canadian Hot 100, making it their first song to chart on a major singles chart.

Suddenly was released on June 22, 2010, in America and on July 20, 2010, in Canada, to generally positive reviews from critics. The album was somewhat successful in its first week (in America), debuting at number 62 on the Billboard 200 albums chart. On August 30, 2010, Allstar Weekend performed "A Different Side of Me" and "The Weekend" on Good Morning America. After the performance, they confirmed that their debut album, Suddenly Yours, would be released on October 19, 2010. The album's lead single, "Come Down with Love", was released on September 17, 2010.

Allstar Weekend's fall tour in 2010 included other acts: Stephen Jerzak, Action Item, and The Scene Aesthetic. The tour started on November 4, 2010, in Las Vegas, Nevada, and ended on December 17 at House of Blues on Sunset Boulevard in Los Angeles, California. In February 2011, they were on the Glamour Kills Tour with The Ready Set.

=== 2011–2012: All the Way and Darmody's departure ===
On May 20, 2011, they announced their new album, All the Way, would be released on July 19, but it was moved to September 27, 2011. With a successful first week, All the Way debuted at number 49 on the Billboard 200 albums chart.

"Not Your Birthday" was released as the first single from All the Way on February 25, 2011, premiering that night on Radio Disney. The song was recorded for the soundtrack of Disney's film Prom, and is featured in the film. The single was delayed on being released for purchase and eventually became available on iTunes on March 22, 2011.

It was announced on June 20, 2011, via the band's Facebook, that Darmody would not be touring with the band on their tour with Selena Gomez & The Scene, due to personal issues. On July 13, Allstar Weekend stated that guitarist Eric Nicolau would be filling in for Darmody on their tour with Selena Gomez & the Scene. On July 25, they announced that their second single from All the Way would be "Blame It on September", which was released on August 16, 2011. Their song "Hey, Princess" was featured in the Disney Channel Original Movie Geek Charming.

On September 17, 2011, it was announced via TwitLonger that Darmody had left the band. The band stated that they would not release the details of his departure and that they would search for a permanent member to replace him. Since leaving the band, Darmody has continued his career as a solo artist under the title of IWXO (which stands for "I'm With Love").

=== 2012–2013: Record label departure, new records, cancelled third album and split ===
On January 8, 2012, the band announced via Stickam their departure from their former label Hollywood Records, citing how the label restricted them in what they wanted to do (touring internationally, mature themes in songs, etc.). In August 2012, they confirmed that they had signed a distribution deal with Universal Music Canada.

In March 2012, the band announced releasing a 5-song extended play on July 3, 2012. The EP features the singles "Wanna Dance With Somebody" (ASW 2012), a cover of Whitney Houston's "I Wanna Dance with Somebody (Who Loves Me)", "Life as We Know It" and, later, "The Last Time" remix featuring Kina Grannis. Originally the EP was called Kevin's Place, but its title was changed to The American Dream before its release.

In October 2012, the band began a Kickstarter campaign to fund their next album, which was given the working name Ballin'. On December 3, 2012, the band announced via Twitter that they would be going on a headlining tour in January and February 2013. On January 4, 2013, Allstar Weekend announced they would also be playing at Warped Tour 2013.

On January 18, 2013, Porter, Quiseng, and Martinez announced via Stickam that the band would be taking a 'permanent hiatus' after Warped Tour, citing the gap in musical style between their current and previous material. They stated that they would be starting a new band, along with touring member Brent Schneiders, but would not perform any Allstar Weekend songs under the new project. They played their final show on August 4, 2013, in Houston.

On February 14, 2013, the band released a cover song EP titled Kevin's Place. On it, the band covers "Drops Of Jupiter" by Train, "Thunder Road" by Bruce Springsteen, "Enchanted" by Taylor Swift, "Perfect Situation" by Weezer and "I Love You Always Forever" by Donna Lewis. The cover song EP is available on iTunes only.

On August 1, 2013, they released their own mobile game, which was available on iOS and Android, titled ASW Restaurant.

In October 2013, it was revealed that the band was coming out with one more album, stating: "We have decided it would be more appropriate to thank you in an ALLSTAR WEEKEND release. As you may know, we are releasing an album of all unreleased tracks/B-sides. This CD will be out for the holiday season." However, by January 2014, their manager, Stefanie, stated, "Allstar Weekend broke up so anything we release or work on is not our (Allstar Weekend's) priority. But the artwork for the unreleased tracks/B-sides CD is being done now." With no updates made on further recording, the album was quietly cancelled.

=== 2013–present: Post-split ===
After the dissolution of Allstar Weekend, Porter, Quiseng, Martinez, and Schneiders formed a new band, The Tragic Thrills. The Kickstarter-funded Allstar Weekend album was released as the new band's self-titled debut in October 2013.

Martinez and Schneiders left the band in April 2014. Quiseng went on an indefinite hiatus in January 2015, and the band currently consists of Zach Porter (lead vocals), Chris Morrison (lead guitar), Ans Gibson (drums), and live member Gabe Rudner (keyboard). In May 2023, Porter was interviewed on the YouTube channel "The Voice Party Podcast" giving details on how the band was formed and the reasons behind their disbandment.

== Guest appearances ==
The band guest-starred on Sonny with a Chance in the episode "A So Random Halloween Special" to perform "Come Down with Love" which is also featured on the show's soundtrack. They appeared on Lopez Tonight and Rachel Ray, also performing "Come Down with Love".

On February 26, 2012, they were featured on MTV's 10 on Top. They were the "One to Watch". They talked about their days when they were a garage band compared to their lives now and how they're living the dream. They also talked about their pre-show rituals. On March 19, 2011, they were again in 10 on Top, ranking number 4 due to their new music video "Not Your Birthday". They have also been on MTV's The Seven twice. The second time was on May 13, 2011, and they ranked at number two.

They performed "Not Your Birthday" live on television for the first time on MuchMusic's New.Music.Live. in Toronto, Ontario, Canada. They again performed it on Live with Regis and Kelly on May 30, 2011. On August 7, 2011, Allstar Weekend was at the 2011 Teen Choice Awards presenting for the dance crew Poreotics. On August 26, 2012, they performed live on Family Channel's Big Ticket Summer Concert.

On September 25, 2011, the band performed live at The Next Star Finale in Toronto, playing "Blame It On September" and "Mr. Wonderful". The following day, they performed "Blame it On September" live on Live with Regis and Kelly. On the release day of All The Way, September 27, they played "Blame It On September", and "Mr. Wonderful" on Good Morning America.

== Band members ==
Final lineup

- Zachary "Zach" Porter – lead vocals (2008–2013)
- Cameron Quiseng – bass guitar, backing vocals (2008–2013)
- Michael Martinez – drums, percussion (2008–2013)

Former

- Thomas Norris – rhythm guitar, keyboards, backing vocals (2008–2009)
- Nathan Darmody – lead guitar, backing vocals (2008–2011)

Live

- Ben Ross – keyboard, rhythm guitar, backing vocals (2009)
- Eric Nicolau – lead guitar, backing vocals (2011)
- Dillon Anderson – keyboard, rhythm guitar, backing vocals (2009–2013)
- Brent Schneiders – lead guitar, backing vocals (2011–2013)

== Discography ==
=== Studio albums ===
List of studio albums, with selected chart positions
Title	Album details	Peak chart positions	
Title	Album details	US	CAN
Suddenly Yours	Released: October 19, 2010; Label: Hollywood; Formats: CD, digital download	197	—
All the Way	Released: September 27, 2011; Label: Hollywood; Formats: CD, digital download	49	71
"—" denotes a release that did not chart or was not released in that territory.

=== Extended plays ===
List of extended plays, with selected chart positions and sales figures
Title	Details	Peak chart positions		Sales
Title	Details	US	CAN	Sales
Suddenly	Released: June 21, 2010; Formats: CD, digital download; Label: Hollywood	62	31	US: 7,000
The American Dream	Released: July 3, 2012; Label: Diggit Records; Formats: CD, digital download	—	—	
Kevin's Place – A Cover Song EP	Released: February 14, 2013; Label: Diggit Records; Formats: Digital download, streaming	—	—	
"—" denotes a release that did not chart or was not released in that territory.

=== Singles ===
List of singles as lead artist, with selected chart positions
Title	Year	Peak chart positions			Album
Title	Year	US Bub	US Heat	CAN	Album
"A Different Side of Me"	2010	—	—	—	Suddenly Yours
"Dance Forever"	2010	20	16	45	Suddenly Yours
"Come Down with Love"	2010	—	—	—	Suddenly Yours
"Not Your Birthday"	2011	—	—	89	All the Way
"Blame It on September"	2011	—	—	—	All the Way
"Christmas Kisses"	2011	—	—	—	Non-album single
"Wanna Dance With Somebody"	2012	—	—	—	The American Dream
"Life As We Know It"	2012	—	—	—	The American Dream
"Monster Mash"	2012	—	—	—	Non-album singles
"The Last Time" (feat. Kina Grannis)	2013	—	—	—	Non-album singles
"—" denotes a single that did not chart or was not released in that territory.

=== Soundtrack appearances ===
- Disneymania 7 (2010)
- The Last Song (2010)
- Sonny with a Chance (2010)
- Prom (2011)
- Punk Goes Pop 4 (2011)
- Geek Charming (2011)
- Have A Crappy Summer (2012)

== Tours ==
This is a list of all the tours that Allstar Weekend has participated in; individual concerts are not included.

Tour name	Participating artists	Continent	Participating from–to
Verizon Experience the Magic Tour (Acoustic)	Allstar Weekend & Emily Osment	(United States) North America	February - March, 2010
Suddenly Tour	Allstar Weekend, Days Difference, Action Item & Savvy and Mandy	(United States) (Canada) North America	Summer 2010
Suddenly Yours Tour	Allstar Weekend, Stephen Jerzak, The Scene Aesthetic & Action Item	(United States) North America	November - December, 2010
Military Tour	Allstar Weekend	(United Kingdom) (Germany) (Belgium) (Netherlands) Europe	January 2011
The Glamour Kills Tour	The Ready Set, Allstar Weekend, The Downtown Fiction, We Are the In Crowd, You, Me, and Everyone We Know & Marianas Trench	(United States) North America	February 23 - April 9, 2011
Canadian Tour	Allstar Weekend, Action Item & Done with Dolls	(Canada) (United States) North America	May 14–29, 2011
We Own the Night Tour	Allstar Weekend, Selena Gomez & the Scene & Christina Grimmie	(United States) (Canada) North America	July 28 - September 10, 2011
All The Way Tour	Allstar Weekend, Hollywood Ending, The After Party, Before You Exit, Megan & Liz, Anth, Just Left, The Composure & The Stellar Life	(United States) (Canada) North America	January 13 - February 26, 2012
Summer of Love Tour	Allstar Weekend, Honor Society, This Is All Now, Namesake & Rocky Loves Emily	(United States) (Canada) North America	July 17 - August 26, 2012
Winter Tour 2013	Allstar Weekend, Cute Is What We Aim For, Tiffany Alvord & Beneath The Sun	(Canada) (United States) North America	January 19 - February 22, 2013
Warped Tour 2013	Allstar Weekend and many other artists	(Canada) (United States) North America	June 15 - August 4, 2013
