= Dance Forever =

Dance Forever may refer to:

- "Dance Forever" (Allstar Weekend song), 2010
- "Dance Forever" (Todrick Hall song), 2022

== See also ==
- Dancing Forever, 2006 album by Jolin Tsai
