= The Downtown Fiction =

American pop-punk band

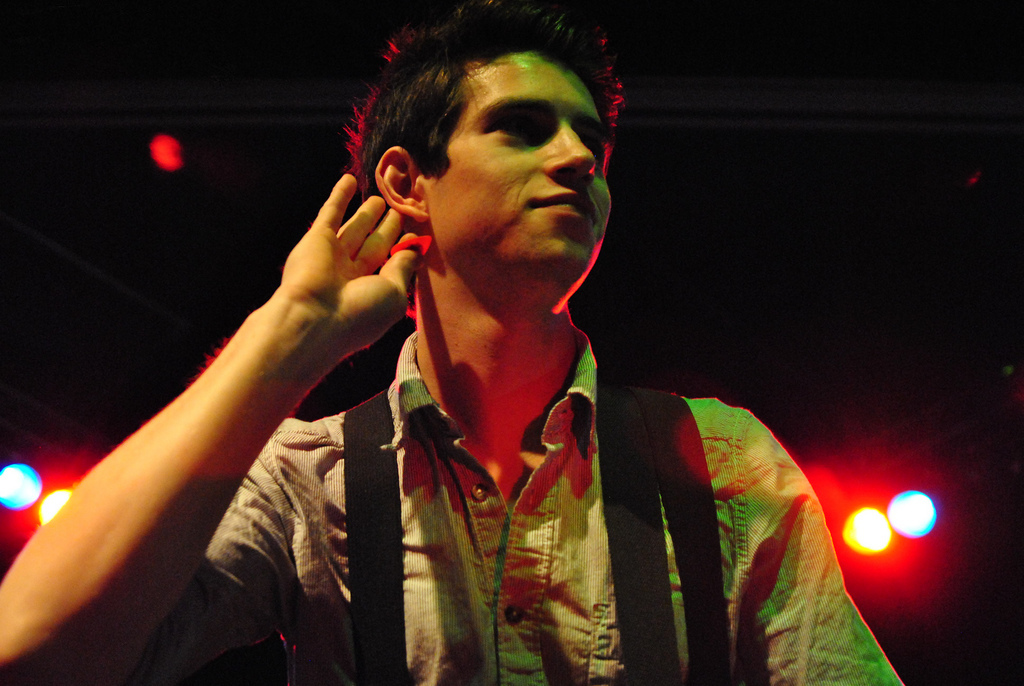
- Cameron Leahy performing with The Downtown Fiction

Background information
- Origin: Fairfax, Virginia, United States
- Genres: Alternative rock; pop-punk; power pop
- Years active: 2008–2016
- Label: Photo Finish Records
- Past members: Cameron Leahy; David Pavluk; Wes Dimond; Kyle Rodgers; Devin Cooper; Eric Jones
- Website: http://www.thedowntownfiction.com/

The Downtown Fiction was an American rock band from Fairfax, Virginia. The band consisted of guitarist and lead vocalist Cameron Leahy, bassist and backing vocalist David Pavluk, guitarist and backing vocalist Wes Dimond, and drummer Kyle Rodgers.

== Music career ==
Lead singer/guitarist/primary songwriter Cameron Leahy met former drummer Eric Jones at Westfield High School, where they became friends. They had a mutual interest in music, and formed The Downtown Fiction in the summer of 2008. They began to post demos on the band's MySpace page, where their fan base initialized. Needing a bassist, Cameron and Eric added David Pavluk to the band, who also is responsible for background vocals. "The Downtown Fiction" is inspired by the cult-classic film Pulp Fiction, a favorite of the band. They also added Wes Dimond, who is now a 5th grade teacher.

The Downtown Fiction toured for a year, and were soon signed to Photo Finish Records, an independent record label based in New York. They toured on the Bamboozle Road Show 2010 and the Warped Tour 2010. The band was featured that year in the "100 Bands You Need To Know" issue of Alternative Press. A self-titled EP by the band was released in March 2009, featuring a few of their rising hit songs, including "Is Anybody Out There?" and "Living Proof." This was succeeded by an additional EP a year later in March 2010, titled Best I Never Had.

Later a compilation was released, The Double E.P., incorporating all of their preceding EP's tracks, and a rough demo of "Keep On Moving." In late February 2011, the band began The Glamour Kills Tour which featured The Ready Set as the headliner, along with Allstar Weekend, We Are The In Crowd, and briefly Marianas Trench.

In August 2010, the band premiered their first music video for the single "I Just Wanna Run," which has become RIAA Certification Gold, later appearing on their 2011 debut album Let's Be Animals.

In early April, the band's second single for their debut album premiered, titled "Thanks For Nothing". In late April 2011, Let's Be Animals, the band's first full-length studio album was released. The Downtown Fiction also embarked on their first headlining nationwide tour with the same album name. The Let's Be Animals Tour featured Amely, Cady Groves, and He Is We.

In Summer 2011, the band joined the Friday is Forever Tour with We the Kings, The Summer Set, Hot Chelle Rae, and Action Item. On September 15, 2011, the band announced on their website that drummer Eric Jones was leaving the band to work in the industry side of music and live guitarist Wes Dimond would become an official band member. Later in December, the band announced Kyle Rodgers would become their new drummer. The Downtown Fiction released their fourth EP, Pineapple EP, on December 20, 2011. On December 31, 2011, they opened for The Ready Set and The Romantics at the HOTFM 2011-2012 HOT New Year's Eve Party in Grand Rapids, Michigan.

On August 5, 2012, All Time Low announced their 'Rockshow at the End of the World' fall tour, with support from the Summer Set and The Downtown Fiction.

The Downtown Fiction announced in April 2012 they had begun working on their sophomore full-length effort in Los Angeles, CA. The band also toured South America in September 2012. In September 2013, the band signed with Fearless Records. The video for their single, "Some Place On Earth," debuted December 18, 2013 on VEVO, which appeared later on their new record, "Losers and Kings", which was released on June 17, 2014.

In the fall of 2014, The Downtown Fiction toured with fellow musicians Against the Current, The Ready Set, and Metro Station on "The Outsider's Tour." In the spring of 2015, the band accompanied Yellowcard & Finch on the Yellowcard 2015 Tour.

=== Recent ===
In late 2015, RIAA announced the band's single, "I Just Wanna Run" had received Gold RIAA certification.

On January 29, 2016, The Downtown Fiction released the lyric music video for "Let's Fade Away" on VEVO, the first single off their latest album, Alligator Tears—released February 26, 2016.

Billboard.com premiered the music video for the second single off Alligator Tears, "Hepburn Shades", on May 7, 2016, featuring actress Matilda Lutz and directed by Remii Huang.

== Band members ==
=== Final lineup ===
- Cameron Leahy – lead vocals, guitar (2008–2016)
- David Pavluk – bass, backing vocals (2008–2016)
- Wes Dimond – lead guitar, backing vocals (2011–2016)
- Kyle Rodgers – drums (2011–2016)

=== Former ===
- Devin Cooper – bass (2008)
- Eric Jones – drums (2008–2011)

=== Touring ===
- Alan Scarpa – rhythm guitar (2008–2010)

== Appearances in media ==
- They were featured in the "100 Bands You Need To Know" issue of Alternative Press.
- "I Just Wanna Run" is on the Hopeless RecordsSub city compilation album, Take Action! Volume 9.
- The band's cover of Nicki Minaj's "Super Bass" appeared on 2011's Punk Goes Pop 4.

== Discography ==
=== The Downtown Fiction (EP) (2009) ===
1. Your Voice
2. Is Anybody Out There
3. Hold My Breath
4. When You're Around
5. No Typical Thursday Night
6. Living Proof
7. Living Proof (Acoustic Version)
8. Forgot It Was Christmas
9. Keep Moving (Rough Demo)

=== Best I Never Had (EP) (2010) ===
1. Best I Never Had
2. Oceans Between Us
3. I Just Wanna Run
4. Take Me Home
5. You Were Wrong
6. Where Dreams Go to Die

=== The Double EP (2010) ===
1. Best I Never Had
2. Oceans Between Us
3. I Just Wanna Run
4. Take Me Home
5. You Were Wrong
6. Where Dreams Go to Die
7. Your Voice
8. Is Anybody Out There
9. Hold My Breath
10. When You're Around
11. No Typical Thursday Night
12. Living Proof
13. Living Proof (Acoustic Version)
14. Forgot It Was Christmas
15. Keep Moving (Rough Demo)

=== Let's Be Animals (2011) ===
1. Thanks For Nothing
2. Freak
3. Stoned
4. I Just Wanna Run
5. She Knows
6. Let's Be Animals
7. Wake Up
8. Medicine For You (bonus track)
9. Alibi
10. Tell Me a Lie
11. Losing My Mind (bonus track)
12. Sierra (bonus track)
13. A Wonderful Surprise
14. Hurt Me So Good (bonus track)

=== Pineapple (EP) (2011) ===
1. Out in the Streets
2. Get It Right
3. Happy (Without You)
4. Feeling Better
5. Circles

=== Losers & Kings (2014) ===
1. Some Place on Earth
2. Hope I Die on a Saturday Night
3. Don't Count Me Out
4. Kiss My Friends
5. Santa Cruz
6. No Generation
7. Cool Kids
8. So-Called Life
9. Big Mistakes
10. Right Where We Left Off
11. Sometimes
12. Know My Name (Japan bonus track)

=== Alligator Tears (EP) (2016) ===
1. Let's Fade Away
2. Dream Within A Dream
3. Van Gogh Colors
4. Is This The End
5. Hepburn Shades
