= Me, Myself and Time =

Promotional single by Demi Lovato

from the album Sonny with a Chance
- Released: August 3, 2010
- Genre: Pop rock; dance-rock
- Length: 3:47
- Label: Walt Disney
- Songwriter(s): Antonina Armato; Tim James; Devrim Karaoglu
- Producer(s): Antonina Armato; Tim James

"Me, Myself and Time" is a pop song by American singer-songwriter and actress Demi Lovato, recorded for her sitcom Sonny with a Chance, and is the second song from the soundtrack of the same name. It was released as a promotional single on August 3, 2010, but was shown worldwide on April 11, 2010.

== Background ==
"Me, Myself and Time" was released as a promotional single from the soundtrack. It was named the best song from the soundtrack. The song is from the episode "Sonny with a Song" in the series Sonny with a Chance.

== Composition ==
The song lasts three minutes and forty-seven seconds and is written in the key of F major. It is accompanied by drums, electric guitar and piano. The song starts with piano and electric guitar with notes GC Em, The song was performed by Lovato. The live performance is in an episode of the second season, taped in Hollywood, California, at the studio Hollywood Center Studios.

== Chart performance ==
The song failed to enter the U.S. Billboard Hot 100, but it did peak at the Bubbling Under Hot 100 Singles chart at number seven. It has topped the Radio Disney Top 30 Countdown. The song peaked at number 69 on the US Hot Digital Songs.

== Track listings ==
- Digital download
1. "Me, Myself and Time" – 3:47

== Charts ==
Chart (2010)	Peak position
Canada (Hot Canadian Digital Songs)	74
US Billboard Bubbling Under Hot 100 Singles	7
US Hot Digital Songs	69
