= Suddenly Yours =

Studio album by Allstar Weekend
- Released: October 19, 2010
- Recorded: 2010
- Genre: Pop rock; pop punk; pop
- Length: 35:59
- Label: Hollywood
- Producer: Howard Benson

Allstar Weekend chronology
Suddenly (2010)	Suddenly Yours (2010)	All the Way (2011)

Singles from Suddenly Yours
- 1. "A Different Side of Me" Released: March 2, 2010; 2. "Dance Forever" Released: June 7, 2010; 3. "Come Down with Love" Released: September 19, 2010

Suddenly Yours is the debut studio album by the American pop rock band Allstar Weekend. It was released on October 19, 2010 by Hollywood Records.

The album is preceded by the lead single, "Dance Forever", which was released on June 7, 2010. The album's second single, "Come Down with Love" was released on September 19, 2010.

== Background ==
On August 30, 2010, Allstar Weekend performed Dance Forever and The Weekend live on Good Morning America. After the performance, they confirmed that their debut album, titled Suddenly Yours would be released on October 19, 2010. The album's lead single, titled "Come Down with Love", was released on September 19 with the music video out on September 21.

They stated that the album will feature the seven tracks from their debut EP, Suddenly, as well four new ones including their new lead single for Suddenly Yours, "Come Down with Love."

== Promotion ==
On August 30, 2010, Allstar Weekend performed "Dance Forever" and "The Weekend" live on Good Morning America. In addition, they were on the Disney Channel series Sonny with a Chance to sing "Come Down With Love". They have already completed their second tour "The Suddenly Yours Tour".

== Singles ==
"A Different Side of Me" was released as the first official single off the album on March 2, 2010. This single also appears on the soundtrack to the film The Last Song.

"Dance Forever" was released as the second official single off the album on June 7, 2010. The music video was released June 4, 2010.

The album's third, and final, official single off the album, "Come Down with Love", was released September 19, 2010. It first premiered on Radio Disney on September 17, 2010. The music video premiered on the Disney Channel two days later on September 19, 2010. Allstar Weekend performed this song on the Disney Channel Original Series Sonny with a Chance when they guest starred on the show; the episode was aired on October 17, 2010.

=== Music videos ===
"Dance Forever" - Allstar Weekend's official music video for "Dance Forever" takes place at a modern-day house with the band performing poolside at a party. Nathan Darmody, the lead guitarist has the opening vocals with the band performing on the grass next to the pool. At the same time that the band is performing there are also a lot activities going on such as jumping in the pool, hula hooping, and dance lines. The setting then turns to night at which point the band is still performing. The video ends with lights shining down on the band as they just finished their song. The video was shot in Woodland Hills, California on May 20, 2010.

"A Different Side of Me" - Allstar Weekend's official music video for "A Different Side of Me" contains the four members of the band running from some sort of get-together. They discover a castle then explore it, going their separate ways, while they discover everything from a princess, to a witch and have an epic sword battle.

"Come Down With Love"- Allstar Weekend's official music video for "Come Down With Love" starts out with the band waking up on top of a van. After meeting up with a group of friends the band, along with their friends drive to the beach. They are seen performing on the beach as well as splashing in the water and having a good time. At about 2:00 minutes into the video the sun sets and it becomes dark with the band still performing. This is similar to what happened in the "Dance Forever" music video. The video ends with Zach Porter, the lead singer, at a blue car on the beach singing the closing lyrics.

The track "The Weekend" is not a single but a music video was made.

== Track listing ==
No.	Title	Writer(s)	Length
1.	"Come Down with Love"	Zachary Porter, Nathan Darmody, Mike Daly	3:05
2.	"Hey, Princess"	Porter, Darmody, Sam Hollander, Dave Katz	3:18
3.	"Dance Forever"	Darmody, Porter, Thomas Norris	3:41
4.	"Catching Up"	Darmody, Porter, Dave Bassett	2:48
5.	"A Different Side of Me"	Porter, Darmody, Norris	3:08
6.	"Here with You"	Darmody, Porter, Daly, Norris, James Bourne	3:07
7.	"Amy"	Porter, Darmody, John Feldmann	3:45
8.	"Clock Runs Out"	Porter, Darmody, Norris, Feldmann	3:22
9.	"Can't Sleep Tonight"	Porter, Darmody, Marty James, Frank Romano, Jim Bottari	3:35
10.	"Journey to the End of My Life"	Porter, Darmody, Norris, Bourne	2:51
11.	"The Weekend"	Porter, Darmody, Feldmann	3:17
Total length:			35:59

iTunes bonus tracks
No.	Title	Writer(s)	Length
12.	"Meet Me in the Middle" (iTunes/Amazon.com bonus track)	Porter, Darmody, Mike Green, Simon Wilcox	2:55
13.	"Come Down With Love" (Video)		3:13
14.	"The Weekend" (Video)		3:15
15.	"Dance Forever" (Video)		3:48
16.	"A Different Side of Me" (Video)		3:16

== Personnel ==
- Lead vocals – Zach Porter
- Lead guitar – Nathan Darmody
- Bass guitar – Cameron Quiseng
- Drums/percussion – Michael Martinez
- Keyboard – Dillon Anderson

== Charts ==
Chart	Peak position
US Billboard 200	197
