= Red Band Society =

American medical teen drama television series

- Genre: Teen drama; Comedy drama; Dark comedy; Medical drama
- Based on: Polseres vermelles by Albert Espinosa
- Developed by: Margaret Nagle
- Starring: Octavia Spencer; Dave Annable; Astro; Ciara Bravo; Griffin Gluck; Zoe Levin; Rebecca Rittenhouse; Charlie Rowe; Nolan Sotillo; Mandy Moore; Wilson Cruz
- Narrated by: Griffin Gluck
- Composer: John Swihart
- Countries of origin: United States; Spain
- Original language: English
- No. of seasons: 1
- No. of episodes: 13

Production
- Executive producers: Darryl Frank; Justin Falvey; Sergio Aguero; Jason Ensler; Jeannine Renshaw; Rina Mimoun; Margaret Nagle; Steven Spielberg
- Production locations: Atlanta, Georgia
- Running time: 42–45 minutes
- Production companies: ABC Studios; Amblin Television; Filmax

Original release
- Network: Fox (North America); La 1 de TVE (Spain)
- Release: September 17, 2014 – February 7, 2015

Red Band Society is an American teen medical comedy-drama television series that aired on Fox from September 17, 2014, to February 7, 2015. It was developed by Margaret Nagle. In January 2015, the series was canceled after one season.

== Cast and characters ==
=== Main ===
- Octavia Spencer as Dena Jackson, the strict and seemingly scary head nurse overseeing the pediatric facility
- Dave Annable as Dr. Adam McAndrew, a handsome skilled surgeon working at the hospital and an ex-fiancé of Dr. Erin Grace
- Ciara Bravo as Emma Chota, an intelligent patient with anorexia, who is also the girlfriend of Leo and the love interest of Jordi
- Griffin Gluck as Charles "Charlie" Hutchison, a young comatose patient in the pediatrics ward who is also the narrator of the series
- Zoe Levin as Kara Souders, a high school cheerleader with an enlarged heart who is at the bottom of the transplant recipient list due to her drug abuse. She is the love interest of Hunter.
- Rebecca Rittenhouse as Brittany Dobler, a new, ambitious, and cheerful nurse. She has a one-night stand with Dr. McAndrew.
- Charlie Rowe as Leo Roth, an amputee and former osteosarcoma patient who is undergoing rehabilitation. He is the creator and unofficial leader of the Red Band Society. He is in love with Emma and dated her, on and off.
- Nolan Sotillo as Jordi Palacios, a patient with Ewing sarcoma who is newly admitted to the pediatrics ward. He has a crush on Emma.
- Astro as Dashiell "Dash" Hosney, a patient with cystic fibrosis who tries to impress girls. He is best friends with Leo.

Main cast at the premier event, from left to right: Brian Bradley (Astro), Dave Annable, Nolan Sotillo, Ciara Bravo, Griffin Gluck, Rebecca Rittenhouse, Zoe Levin, Octavia Spencer, and Charlie Rowe.

=== Recurring ===
- Wilson Cruz as Kenji Gomez-Rejon, a nurse
- Daren Kagasoff as Hunter Cole, a leukemia survivor who now suffers from cirrhosis and is in need of a liver transplant. He is Kara's love interest.
- Thomas Ian Nicholas as Nick Hutchison, Charlie's father
- Susan Park as Mandy Hutchison, Charlie's mother
- Adrian Lester as Dr. Larry Naday, a famous British neurologist who is brought in to help Charlie and becomes the love interest of Dena
- Mandy Moore as Dr. Erin Grace, McAndrew's ex-fiancée
- Griffin Dunne as Ruben Garcia, an older hypochondria patient
- Catalina Sandino Moreno as Eva Palacios, Jordi's mother
- Andrea Parker as Sarah Souders, Kara's mother
- Tricia O'Kelley as Daniella, Kara's step-mother and former nanny
- Nicolas Bechtel as younger Jordi Palacios
- Jes Macallan as Ashley Cole, Hunter's sister
- Jessica Lu as Mae, Dash's online girlfriend who also has cystic fibrosis
- Rebecca McFarland as Sylvia Roth, Leo's mother
- John Allen Nelson as Jon Chota, Emma's father
- Marin Hinkle as Caroline Chota, Emma's mother, whom Emma hasn't had a good relationship with since her diagnosis
- Bertila Damas as Alma Quintana Leon, Jordi's grandmother, whom he grew up with in Mexico

=== Guest stars ===
- Kennedy Brice as Finley Chota, Emma's (Ciara Bravo) little sister.
- Bella Thorne as Delaney Shaw, a troubled teen pop star who is in the hospital for rehab. She later almost has sex with Dash, who already had an online girlfriend, Mae.

== Development ==
A remake of Polseres vermelles, known in English as The Red Band Society, was originally developed for ABC in 2011 by Friends co-creator Marta Kauffman, but the network chose to not move forward after first production stages. In November 2013, Fox announced a new project to bring an adaptation of the Catalan television show in the United States held by Warm Springs and Boardwalk Empire writer Margaret Nagle. On January 17, 2014, the project received a pilot order, plus additional backup scripts. On May 6, 2014, Fox picked up the pilot with a series order for the 2014–15 season.

== Episodes ==
No.	Title	Directed by	Written by	Original release date	U.S. viewers (millions)
1	"Pilot"	Alfonso Gomez-Rejon	Story by : Margaret Nagle; Teleplay by : Margaret Nagle	September 17, 2014	4.10
Queen bee Kara collapses during cheerleading practice and is admitted to Ocean Park Hospital, where she meets and clashes with some of the other residents of the pediatric ward: Charlie, Emma, Leo, and Dash. Jordi, who believes that he has osteosarcoma, has run away from home to be treated by Dr. Adam McAndrew, and after some hesitation, he is admitted. He is scheduled to have his leg removed the next day and bonds with Leo, who has also lost his leg to cancer.
2	"Sole Searching"	Jason Ensler	Margaret Nagle	September 24, 2014	3.43
During Jordi's operation, Dr. McAndrew finds that the cancer had spread and is a more serious type than originally thought. Upon finding out that Jordi gets to keep his leg, Leo becomes jealous and blows off physical therapy to attend a frat party. Kara's mother arrives at the hospital with her partner, whom Kara despises, and they brainstorm ways to move Kara up on the organ donor list. Emma tries to get Kara and her mother's partner to make amends.
3	"Liar, Liar Pants on Fire"	Tricia Brock	Story by : David Zabel; Teleplay by : Alison McDonald & Robert Sudduth	October 1, 2014	3.53
Everyone is confused when Jordi's mother, Eva, shows up at the hospital after he told them all that she had died. She also turns out to be the woman whom Dr. McAndrew had encountered at a bar the night before. Eva is shown to have been an absentee mother who left Jordi with his grandmother at a young age, and Jordi is skeptical of her sudden interest in parenting. Dr. McAndrew tries to reconcile the two in light of Jordi's cancer diagnosis. Meanwhile, Leo tries to make things right with Emma after he picks up on how close Emma and Jordi are becoming. Also, Nurse Jackson keeps a close eye on Kara to make sure she stays drug-free before her drug test.
4	"There's No Place Like Homecoming"	Elizabeth Allen Rosenbaum	Bill Krebs & Natalie Krinsky	October 8, 2014	2.92
Kara is excited to return to school and attend homecoming under the supervision of Nurse Brittany, who also invites introvert Emma. Leo is revealed to have received an athletic scholarship to Stanford before he lost a leg to cancer. Wanting to get him back to his sport as soon as possible, Nurse Jackson arranges for some special training. At the dance, Kara is furious when she realizes that everyone now pities her. Leo also shows up to the dance to keep Emma company. Emma meets two girls who praise her skinny figure, which does nothing to help her anorexia. Meanwhile, Jordi starts to enjoy having his mother around, although Nurse Jackson feels very differently. After seeing the realities of Jordi's condition, Eva slips away from the hospital at night while Jordi watches from his window, realizing that his mother has not changed.
5	"So Tell Me What You Want What You Really Really Want"	Dan Lerner	Anna Fricke	October 15, 2014	3.17
Charlie's backstory is explained, and the storyline flashes back to the night when he got into a car accident while his father, Nick, was driving. Nick had unbuckled Charlie's seatbeat so he could lie down right before a truck struck them. Nurse Jackson was with him the night he went into the operating room and promised him that she would be there when he woke up. However, Charlie had extensive injuries and never woke up from surgery, instead going into a comatose state. His parents have been estranged ever since. Two lawyers show up to assess Charlie's situation and conclude that he most likely won't ever wake up. Nurse Jackson refuses to accept this, while his parents slowly come to terms with it. Jordi starts the emancipation process, and a love triangle heats up between him, Leo, and Emma. Kara agrees to help Dash if he gives her inside information about the organ donor list.
6	"Ergo Ego"	Jason Ensler	Jeannine Renshaw	November 5, 2014	2.88
Kara experiences more heart complications. She meets Hunter, a mysterious patient who seems to be the only one who can leave her speechless. Nurse Jackson continues to seek alternative treatments for Charlie. Dr. McAndrew's ex-fiancée, Dr. Erin Grace, returns to Ocean Park, sparking jealousy in Brittany, who has a crush on Dr. McAndrew. Things become heated between Leo and Jordi as they wait for Emma to decide whom she wants to pursue. She chooses Leo, and they get back together. Jordi sees them and is furious. He runs to the rooftop, where Dash tries to calm him down, but Jordi takes his red band off and throws it across the roof, leaving Dash speechless. Dr. McAndrew agrees to let a foreign doctor treat Charlie, much to Nurse Jackson's delight. However, he lets her know that switching Charlie's blood samples would cause her to get suspended from the hospital.
7	"Know Thyself"	Griffin Dunne	Rachel Shukert	November 12, 2014	2.83
Dash and Leo want to get the entire group together to figure out a way to get Nurse Jackson back into Ocean Park Hospital. However, Leo has also planned for two of his older friends to come visit him. He and Emma leave shortly after Leo receives a text that his friends are five minutes away. Hunter comes to bring the others on a little adventure. Using a stolen pass, they enter places restricted to staff, but they get caught. Meanwhile, Emma and Leo go to lunch with Leo's friends. Emma, being anorexic, says she is not hungry. Leo's friends seem surprised. When they return to the hospital, things become shaky between Leo and Emma. Leo tries to fix things and eventually succeeds, with the two eating chocolate-covered marshmallows. He returns to his ward only to see Dr. McAndrew talking to the others. Dash looks out of breath; no one knew that he had missed two of his oxygen treatments. Dash talks back to Dr. McAndrew and starts to cough blood. Upon receiving the news, Nurse Jackson rushes back to the hospital and meets Dr. McAndrew. Dr. McAndrew informs her that he has lifted her suspension. She goes to see Charlie and finds that his eyes have opened.
8	"Get Outta My Dreams, Get Into My Car"	Mark Piznarski	Bill Krebs	November 19, 2014	2.90
Dr. Naday comes to Ocean Park Hospital, although his approach to treatment has Dr. McAndrew questioning that decision. Meanwhile, Emma, Dash, Leo, and Jordi search for the perfect gift, and Kara learns the truth about Hunter from his sister.
9	"How Did We Get Here?"	Tricia Brock	Gina Fattore	November 26, 2014	2.46
Emma and Leo find themselves on the verge of being released from Ocean Park. Leo is ahead of schedule with his physical therapy, and Emma convincingly lies to her therapist about her progress with anorexia. Meanwhile, pop star Delaney Shaw checks into the hospital for exhaustion, and Dash and Jordi see this as an opportunity to go after some life goals. Nurse Jackson warns Kara against getting further involved with Hunter. Also, Dr. McAndrew wants Dr. Grace back but ends up sleeping with Brittany, who is left hurt when he tells her that it was nothing but a one-night stand. In the end, while Leo is ordered to stay for another few weeks, Emma is released. Her frustrations with everyone, especially Leo, with regards to her eating disorder finally come out. Leo begs her to stay to get better, but she leaves her red band behind and says goodbye.
10	"What I Did For Love"	Todd Holland	Rina Mimoun	December 3, 2014	3.03
Leo is depressed over Emma's departure, and Kara overhears Hunter opting to check out of the hospital while he waits for a liver transplant. Delaney's friend visits Jordi in hopes of obtaining painkillers, and while he initially objects, he later finds out that he needs to come up with the money for emancipation quicker than he thought. Meanwhile, Emma's reunion with her family is rocky. She resents her mother for visiting her infrequently while she was in the hospital, and she sees how her disorder has affected her younger sister. Her father reveals to her that her grandmother also had an eating disorder, and this sends her into a tailspin. Leo and Kara venture out of the hospital and ponder their futures when they leave Ocean Park. That night, the two hook up in Kara's car. Just as Hunter is about to walk out of the hospital, he is notified that the doctors found him a liver, and he has his surgery. Meanwhile, Dr. Naday has made some progress with Charlie, who is now able to communicate through a computer via eye recognition. He also shows some romantic interest in Nurse Jackson, who wants to avoid an in-office relationship. Brittany is still reeling from her fling with Dr. McAndrew. After Emma's family forces her to have dinner, she locks herself in the bathroom to purge, and a little while later, her father finds her passed out on the bathroom floor.
11	"The Guilted Age"	Dan Lerner	Robert Sudduth	January 31, 2015	1.79
Leo and Kara try to forget that their hookup ever happened, but they feel guilty when they find out that Emma has been readmitted and that Hunter is facing complications from his transplant surgery. Kara finds out that the note Hunter left her is an official document stating that he will donate his heart to her in the event that he doesn't survive the surgery. Dr. Grace wants to appeal, thinking that Kara is undeserving, which (among other things) creates more tension between her and Dr. McAndrew. Emma finds out that her eating disorder might have caused permanent damage to her body and seeks comfort in Leo. Dash suggests that Leo cut ties with Emma so that she will learn to take of herself first and foremost. He confesses about Kara, and Emma kicks him out of her room. Meanwhile, Jordi attends a court hearing for his emancipation case, but he is preoccupied with his drug-dealing situation and freezes up. Nurse Jackson speaks on his behalf, but the judge still denies his emancipation. Upon his return to the hospital, he gets a surprise visit from his grandmother. Kara is conflicted about whether to accept Hunter's heart, though Ashley tells her not to deny him his dying wish. Kara also shares a moment with Emma. Later, Kara sneaks into Hunter's room to say that she loves him. He opens his eyes, but then the machines go off as his heart rate starts to plummet. Hunter is taken into the operating room, but ultimately cannot be saved. An inconsolable Ashley breaks down in Kara's arms. While preparing Leo to be discharged, Dr. McAndrew notices that the cancer has returned.
12	"We'll Always Have Paris"	Robert Duncan McNeill	Story by : Alison McDonald; Teleplay by : Gina Fattore & Anna Fricke	February 7, 2015	1.74
As Kara is undergoing a heart transplant in real life, she finds herself in the in-between world with Hunter. Hunter explains that he has some time left before "going into the light" and suggests that they go on a little trip. They start off watching Kara's body in the operating room, but when Hunter asks about a happy time in Kara's life, they transport to Paris. After their time together, Kara doesn't want to leave Hunter, but he gives her a speech on the importance of life, after which she wakes up from surgery. A temporary patient named Mae shows up at the hospital, putting Dash on alert. They had started an online relationship on a cystic fibrosis forum, but he avoids her because their conditions don't allow them to be together. Charlie is regaining his motor skills, and Dr. Naday has him playing video games. He also tries to make progress with Nurse Jackson, who is still preoccupied with what happened to Hunter. Meanwhile, Jordi's grandmother Alma has taken a disliking to Dr. McAndrew, who is trying to get her to sign off on his surgery. However, Jordi later tells Dr. McAndrew that he doesn't want it anymore, no longer believing that he can get better because of the recent developments with Hunter and Leo. Alma then expresses her disappointment in Jordi for losing his faith, which causes him to reconsider. At the end, Jordi decides to give Leo, who has been depressed and silent since he got the news about his cancer, a pep talk. He is finally able to get through to Leo about continuing to fight.
13	"Waiting for Superman"	Jason Ensler	Jeannine Renshaw	February 7, 2015	1.88
Dash and Mae sneak off to be together, but they are caught by Kenji and Brittany, who end up employing security guards to keep them apart. Emma's parents are visiting for a family therapy session, but Emma's continued resentment toward her mother for dismissing her anorexia gets in the way. After a failed trust fall exercise and an argument with Emma in the bathroom, Emma's mother almost leaves the hospital, but then Brittany has a talk with her in the elevator. It is only when her mother returns that Emma is able to have a deep conversation with her. Kara is also having problems with her mother, who tells her that she needs to learn to change for the better. Kara takes it to heart. Charlie is now able to move about in a wheelchair, and Nurse Jackson thanks Dr. Naday for everything before he jets off to meet with his next patient. Meanwhile, Leo is pessimistic about beating cancer for a second time and being the one to hold everyone up, until Mae tells him that he doesn't always have to be invincible like Superman. After they escape their rooms to see each other, Dash reluctantly ends it with Mae for their own safety. The "red band society", including Charlie, reunites on the roof one last time and starts singing "You Can't Always Get What You Want", which results in Charlie speaking for the first time since his coma. Later that night, he is discharged from Ocean Park. Dr. McAndrew and Nurse Jackson acknowledge that the hardest part of their job is knowing that while everyone eventually leaves, they themselves will always stay.

== Reception ==
On Rotten Tomatoes, the show holds a rating of 58%, based on 48 reviews, but a rating of 40% based on its 25 Top Critics. The site's consensus reads, "Its premise may be questionable and its light-hearted tone is occasionally overbearing, but Red Band Society succeeds on the strength of its young characters." On Metacritic, the show has a score of 58 out of 100, based on 36 critics, indicating "mixed or average reviews".

=== Ratings ===
No.	Title	Air date	Ratings/Share (18–49)	Viewers (millions)	DVR 18-49	DVR Viewers (millions)	Total 18-49	Total Viewers (millions)
1	"Pilot"	September 17, 2014	1.3/4	4.10	—N/a	—N/a	—N/a	—N/a
2	"Sole Searching"	September 24, 2014	1.1/3	3.43	0.9	2.36	2.0	5.79
3	"Liar, Liar Pants on Fire"	October 1, 2014	1.1/3	3.33	0.8	—N/a	1.9	—N/a
4	"There's No Place Like Homecoming"	October 8, 2014	0.9/3	2.92	0.8	—N/a	1.7	—N/a
5	"So Tell Me What You Want What You Really Really Want"	October 15, 2014	1.0/3	3.17	0.7	—N/a	1.7	—N/a
6	"Ergo Ego"	November 5, 2014	0.9/3	2.88	0.7	—N/a	1.6	—N/a
7	"Know Thyself"	November 12, 2014	0.9/3	2.83	—N/a	—N/a	—N/a	—N/a
8	"Get Outta My Dreams, Get Into My Car"	November 19, 2014	0.9/3	2.90	0.6	—N/a	1.5	—N/a
9	"How Did We Get Here?"	November 26, 2014	0.7/2	2.46	—N/a	—N/a	—N/a	—N/a
10	"What I Did For Love"	December 3, 2014	0.9/3	3.03	0.6	—N/a	1.5	—N/a
11	"The Guilted Age"	January 31, 2015	0.5/2	1.79	—N/a	—N/a	—N/a	—N/a
12	"We'll Always Have Paris"	February 7, 2015	0.5/2	1.74	—N/a	—N/a	—N/a	—N/a
13	"Waiting for Superman"	February 7, 2015	0.5/2	1.88	—N/a	—N/a	—N/a	—N/a

== Broadcast ==
The series premiered on September 17, 2014. Based on the Catalan drama series Polseres vermelles, the series focuses on a group of teenagers living together as patients in a hospital's pediatric ward. On November 26, 2014, it was confirmed the show would stop production after its original 13-episode order, and the show was pulled from the schedule after episode 10. On January 13, 2015, it was announced that the show was canceled, and the final three episodes of the series would air starting on January 31 and ending on February 7, 2015, with a two-hour finale.

In Australia, the series premiered on August 26, 2015, on the Seven Network.
