= The American Dream (Allstar Weekend EP) =

EP by Allstar Weekend
- Released: July 3, 2012
- Genre: Pop rock; electropop
- Length: 15:44
- Label: Diggit Records

Allstar Weekend chronology
| All the Way (2011) | The American Dream (2012) | Kevin's Place (cover song EP) (2013) |

The American Dream is the second EP by the American pop rock band Allstar Weekend. It was self-released under their own label, Diggit Records on July 3, 2012.

== Composition ==
The band's member Zachary Porter confirmed that he wrote the song "I Was Born To Die With You" about his parents.

== Singles ==
The EP's first single, "Wanna Dance with Somebody" (ASW 2012), was released on February 13, 2012. An official music video was filmed for this song and it was released on March 4, 2012 on their official YouTube channel, also featuring lyrics of the song. The chorus of the song samples Whitney Houston's hit song "I Wanna Dance with Somebody (Who Loves Me)".

The EP's second single, "Life As We Know It", was released on May 30, 2012. A lyric video was made for the song and released on June 20, 2012 on the band's YouTube channel while the official music video was released on June 29, 2012.

On March 18, 2013, the band re-released the track "The Last Time" as a remixed version featuring vocals from Kina Grannis as a promotional single. This version is available for digital download on iTunes.

== Track listing ==
| No. | Title | Writer(s) | Length |
|---|---|---|---|
| 1. | "Life As We Know It" | Zachary Porter; John Feldmann; Martin Johnson | 3:14 |
| 2. | "The American Dream" | Porter; JP Clark; Jayce Levi | 2:48 |
| 3. | "The Last Time" | Porter; Mitchy Collins; Andrew Goldstein | 3:17 |
| 4. | "I Was Born To Die With You" | Porter; Levi | 2:44 |
| 5. | "Wanna Dance With Somebody" (ASW 2012) | Porter; Jean Paul Makhlouf; Alex Makhlouf; Collins; Richard Reines; George Merrill; Shannon Rubicam | 3:41 |
| Total length: | | | 15:44 |
