= Tell Me a Story (TV series) =

2018 American psychological thriller web television series

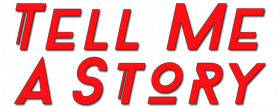
- Genre: Psychological thriller
- Created by: Kevin Williamson
- Based on: Cuéntame un cuento
- Showrunner: Kevin Williamson
- Starring: James Wolk; Billy Magnussen; Dania Ramirez; Danielle Campbell; Dorian Crossmond Missick; Sam Jaeger; Davi Santos; Michael Raymond-James; Zabryna Guevara; Paul Wesley; Kim Cattrall; Odette Annable; Matt Lauria; Eka Darville; Natalie Alyn Lind; Ashley Madekwe; Carrie-Anne Moss
- Composer: John Frizzell
- Country of origin: United States
- Original language: English
- No. of seasons: 2
- No. of episodes: 20

Production
- Executive producers: Gonzalo Cilley; Andres Tovar; Dana Honor; Aaron Kaplan; Liz Friedlander; Kevin Williamson
- Producers: Colin Walsh; Hollie Overton
- Cinematography: Doug Emmett; Charles Grubbs
- Editors: Andrew Groves; Emily Greene; Brock Hammitt; Roseanne Tan; Zachary Dehm
- Camera setup: Single-camera
- Running time: 42–57 minutes
- Production companies: Resonant; Outerbanks Entertainment; Kapital Entertainment

Original release
- Network: CBS All Access
- Release: October 31, 2018 – February 6, 2020

Tell Me a Story is an American psychological thriller anthology television series created by Kevin Williamson for CBS All Access. Based on the Spanish television series Cuéntame un cuento, it depicts iconic fairy tales reimagined as modern-day thrillers. Each season features a mostly different cast ensemble, with Danielle Campbell and Paul Wesley appearing in both seasons of the series.

The first season premiered on October 31, 2018, and concluded on January 3, 2019, after 10 episodes. A second season was announced shortly before the first season ended, which premiered on December 5, 2019, and concluded on February 6, 2020, after another set of 10 episodes. In May 2020, the series was canceled after two seasons. Subsequently, the television broadcast rights to the series were picked up by The CW, where it premiered in July 2020 and aired through December 2020.

== Premise ==
Tell Me a Story takes "the world's most beloved fairy tales and reimagines them as a dark and twisted psychological thriller. Set in modern-day New York City, the first season of this serialized drama interweaves The Three Little Pigs, Little Red Riding Hood and Hansel and Gretel into an epic and subversive tale of love, loss, greed, revenge, and murder."

The second season of the show, set in Nashville, Tennessee, reimagines the princess-themed tales Beauty and the Beast, Sleeping Beauty and Cinderella.

Had it been renewed, the third season would have included adaptations of Snow White, Jack and the Beanstalk and Rapunzel.

== Cast and characters ==
=== Main ===
==== Season 1 ====
- James Wolk as Jordan Evans, a restaurateur in New York City who sets out to exact revenge against the men responsible for his fiancée's death. Jordan's fairy-tale counterpart is the Big Bad Wolf from The Three Little Pigs.
- Billy Magnussen as Joshua "Nick" Sullivan, a high school teacher who engages in a relationship with one of his students. Nick's fairy-tale counterpart is the Wolf from Little Red Riding Hood.
- Dania Ramirez as Hannah Perez, an Army veteran who returns to her hometown of New York City and who has issues with her mother and her stepfather. Hannah's fairy-tale counterpart is Hansel from Hansel and Gretel.
- Danielle Campbell as Kayla Powell, a high school senior still processing her mother's death who recently moved to New York City with her father. Kayla's fairy-tale counterpart is Little Red Riding Hood from Little Red Riding Hood.
- Dorian Crossmond Missick as Sam Reynolds, an NYPD detective who secretly leads a group of criminals. Sam's fairy-tale counterpart is the third little pig from The Three Little Pigs.
- Sam Jaeger as Tim Powell, a widowed father who moves to New York City with his daughter following his wife's death. Tim's fairy-tale counterparts are Little Red Riding Hood's mother and the Woodcutter from Little Red Riding Hood.
- Davi Santos as Gabe Perez, Hannah's brother who accidentally kills someone and who has a drug addiction. Gabe's fairy-tale counterpart is Gretel from Hansel and Gretel.
- Michael Raymond-James as Mitch Longo, a blue-collar worker who struggles to provide for his wife and occasionally pulls off crimes with his brother Eddie. Mitch's fairy-tale counterpart is the second little pig from The Three Little Pigs.
- Zabryna Guevara as Renee Garcia, a detective with the New York Police Department.
- Paul Wesley as Eddie Longo, a bartender and low-level drug dealer and Mitch's brother who operates as a part-time thief to pay off his debts. Eddie's fairy-tale counterpart is the first little pig from The Three Little Pigs.
- Kim Cattrall as Colleen Powell, a former chorus girl and Tim's mother. Colleen's fairy-tale counterpart is Little Red Riding Hood's grandmother from Little Red Riding Hood.

==== Season 2 ====
- Paul Wesley as Tucker Reed, an aspiring writer trying to prove his worth who struggles with a dark and catastrophic secret. Tucker's fairy-tale counterpart is the Dark Fairy from Sleeping Beauty.
- Odette Annable as Madelyn "Maddie" Pruitt, the peace-keeping, overachieving middle child in a broken family. Maddie's fairy-tale counterpart is the Prince from Sleeping Beauty.
- Danielle Campbell as Olivia Moon, a self-absorbed school-oriented girl who moves to Nashville to further her career, but will have to really show her strength for survival. Olivia's fairy-tale counterpart is the titular princess from Sleeping Beauty.
- Matt Lauria as Jackson Pruitt, the black sheep of a family who is torn between his demons and the desire to be a better man. Jackson's fairy-tale counterpart is the Prince from Cinderella.
- Eka Darville as Beau Morris, a police officer who struggles to navigate his new reality after his adherence to a moral code blows up both his personal and professional life. Beau's fairy-tale counterpart is Beauty from Beauty and the Beast.
- Natalie Alyn Lind as Ashley Rose Pruitt, a rising country music star who survives a brutal attack, then confines herself to her home. Ashley's fairy-tale counterpart is the Beast from Beauty and the Beast.
- Ashley Madekwe as Simone Garland, a mysterious young woman who is forced to come face-to-face with the life she purposefully left behind and will put her own life in danger to uncover her family's dark secrets. Simone's fairy-tale counterpart is Cinderella from Cinderella.
- Carrie-Anne Moss as Rebecca Pruitt, Ashley's mother and a single mother of three who faces relationship problems with her children, and who finally starts to live for herself.

=== Recurring ===
==== Season 1 ====
- Paulina Singer as Laney Reed, a classmate of Kayla's whom she quickly befriends and shares her secrets with.
- Kurt Yaeger as Terry, Hannah's veteran friend from the war who is disabled, but still sharp at his craft for long-range shooting. He joins forces with Hannah against the people who threaten her.
- Becki Newton as Katrina Thorne, the manager of the hotel where Tim works, and later his girlfriend. She also harbors secrets of her own, each with their own deadly goals. Katrina's fairy-tale counterpart is the Witch from Hansel and Gretel.
- Spencer Grammer as Beth, Jordan's girlfriend who was killed and later guides him on his quest as a figment of his imagination.
- Rarmian Newton as Ethan Davies, a classmate of Kayla's who becomes obsessed with her and appears to have signs of a dangerous mental illness.
- Justine Cotsonas as Carla, Eddie's girlfriend who he wants to run away with.
- Tonya Glanz as Shelley, Mitch's wife who knows nothing of what he really did and who he is.
- James Martinez as Olsen, a dirty cop working for Sam.
- Debra Monk as Esther Thorne, Katrina's mother who works for her daughter in kidnapping and getting what she wants from their clients.
- Luke Guldan as Billy, Gabe's friend and roommate who is also a stripper and sex worker.
- Jennifer Ikeda as Rita, someone working with Jordan to find out who killed Beth.
- Sanjit De Silva as Mark, someone working with Jordan to find out who killed Beth.
- Dan Amboyer as Blake, a male stripper and sex worker who works with Billy and Gabe.
- Polly Draper as Madeline, Hannah and Gabe's mother who abandoned them and their father many years ago, and who Hannah resents.
- Claire Saunders as Vicki, a friend of Kayla.
- David Andrews as Richard Winston, Hannah and Gabe's step-father who truly cares for them and wants to help them.
- Elliot Villar as Detective Herrera, one of two cops who are investigating Beth's murder.
- Quincy Chad as Detective Grant, one of two cops who are investigating Beth's murder.
- Simone Missick as Mariana Reynolds, Sam's wife who is in the dark.

==== Season 2 ====
- Kathryn Prescott as Susie, Ashley Rose Pruitt's friend and assistant.
- Phillip Rhys as Damien Hewett, a slick, straight-shooting record executive to rising country music singer Ashley Rose Pruitt.
- Casey Thomas Brown as Kyle Verafield, a man with a dark obsession for Ashley.
- Evan Parke as Ken Morris, Beau's father who is hired by Ashley's label to protect her following her accident. Ken's fairy-tale counterpart is the Merchant from Beauty and the Beast.
- Garcelle Beauvais as Veronica Garland, Simone's stepmother who is protective of her status and her two sons. Veronica's fairy-tale counterpart is the Wicked Stepmother from Cinderella.
- Caleb Castille as Ron Garland, the smart, dominant older sibling to Derek. Ron's fairy-tale counterpart is one of the Wicked Stepsisters from Cinderella.
- Christopher Meyer as Derek Garland, the soft-spoken, fiercely loyal younger sibling to Ron. Derek's fairy-tale counterpart is one of the Wicked Stepsisters from Cinderella.
- Harry Shum Jr. as Brendan, a lawyer and Maddie's ex-boyfriend.
- Audrey Corsa as Taylor, a woman who has a hidden rage within and tries to protect her boyfriend after he does something horrible.
- Julia Campbell as Cora, Simone's godmother. Cora's fairy-tale counterpart is the Fairy Godmother from Cinderella.
- Felisha Terrell as Detective Gwen Roberts, Beau's old partner who is investigating Ashley's case.
- Matt Walton as Clay Callaway, Simone's father's lawyer who is mysteriously involved in his death and with Veronica.
- Karina Logue as Donna Kading, a woman Jackson meets when he begins attending Alcoholics Anonymous.

=== Guest ===
- Marguerite Moreau as Abby Powell, Kayla's mother who mysteriously died. (season 1)
- Charles Esten as Ronnie Pruitt, Jackson, Ashley, and Maddie's deceased father who played music and was an alcoholic. He was especially close to Jackson. (season 2)

== Episodes ==
Season	Episodes	Originally released	
Season	Episodes	First released	Last released
1	10	October 31, 2018	January 3, 2019
2	10	December 5, 2019	February 6, 2020

=== Season 1 (2018–19) ===
No. overall	No. in season	Title	Directed by	Written by	Original release date
1	1	"Chapter 1: Hope"	Liz Friedlander	Kevin Williamson	October 31, 2018
Kayla is a troubled teenager who has just moved from California to New York City with her widowed father, Tim, to live with her grandmother, Colleen (Tim's mother), after her mother's death. Kayla does not like the move and cannot relate to anyone. In an attempt to fit in, she sneaks out with Laney, a girl from high school and gets into a bar using a fake ID. There she meets Nick Sullivan, who she quickly has sex with. She later finds out he is her new teacher. Jordan Evans and his girlfriend Beth have been fighting over Jordan wanting to marry and have children, while Beth does not want to bring a child into the world. Elsewhere, Gabe Perez and his roommate Billy are dancers and gay male escorts who meet a man, named Dan, in his room one night. When Billy tries to steal from the man, a fight ensues and the man is accidentally killed. Gabe calls his sister Hannah to clean up the mess and they stage it to look like an accident. Brothers Mitch and Eddie, both in desperate need of money, agree to help lifelong thief Sam rob a jewelry store, just as Beth and Jordan agree they want to marry and go to purchase rings. The job quickly goes wrong, and Beth is shot dead along with a security guard.
2	2	"Chapter 2: Loss"	Liz Friedlander	Eduardo Javier Canto & Ryan Maldonado	November 8, 2018
Jordan is questioned by the police to see if he can identify anything about the murders, to which he only knows what Eddie's eyes looked like. The police are later able to identify Eddie and Detective Garcia tells him she knows he did not kill those people, but wants more information from him. She later has him participate in a lineup and Jordan identifies him as the man who killed Beth. However, Eddie cannot yet be charged. Nick is worried about getting fired and possibly in trouble after having sex with Kayla, but she tells him not to worry about it. Kayla and her friends, Laney and Ethan, skip school again the next day and Laney tries to get her to tell them what she is hiding, but she refuses to share. Also, Hannah investigates the man who Gabe accidentally killed and learns that he was a businessman caught up in shady business. It is later reported on the news that his body was found in the river. After a fight with her father, Kayla storms out and ends up seeking comfort in Nick. Jordan later visits Eddie at work, which scares him, but Mitch tells him to not be paranoid as Jordan watches Eddie from outside his window.
3	3	"Chapter 3: Greed"	Mark Tonderai	Hollie Overton	November 15, 2018
Jordan feels like the police are ignoring him and that Beth's murder will never be solved. Hannah wanting to have something to protect herself, turns on Dan's phone and hears Sam on the other end of the line. She hangs up and throws the phone away but finds a storage unit card. Kayla must start working for Colleen at her costume store, and is visited by Ethan, who knows about her and Nick, and tries to blackmail her. Laney confronts Ethan about what he knows, which almost leads to Kayla and Nick's relationship being outed. Elsewhere, Mitch and Eddie try to get their money from Sam, who threatens them. Jordan sneaks into Eddie's house and almost kills him but cannot go through with it. Hannah finds that Dan had two million dollars hidden in a storage locker and wants to take it and start a new life with Gabe who does not want to. Kayla goes to Nick's to see how he is where they talk about their relationship, before having sex again. Gabe comes home to find Billy dead and tortured and realizes that whoever killed him is after Hannah. Before she can escape, she is attacked by a man looking for the money. She ends up killing him and leaving with the money.
4	4	"Chapter 4: Rage"	Mark Tonderai	Kim Clements	November 22, 2018
Jordan goes to the police with Eddie's pig mask but Garcia tells him that he has tampered with the investigation and he has not helped. Kayla and Nick's relationship grows, with Nick becoming worried about Kayla talking to Ethan after he finds out that he has a police record. Also, Hannah and Gabe leave the city for North Carolina. Kayla spends the day with Ethan and he ends up sexually assaulting her, with Colleen breaking it up, which makes her curious at Kayla's actions. Hannah reveals she was injured while serving in the military. Jordan tries to get Eddie's girlfriend, Carla, to reveal to him who the shooter was but Eddie ends up beating him up and threatening him to stay away. Ethan later texts Nick a picture of him kissing Kayla, with the words "you're done". While Hannah is sleeping, Gabe instead drives them to their estranged mother's house.
5	5	"Chapter 5: Madness"	Solvan "Slick" Naim	Heather Zuhlke	November 29, 2018
Jordan has been seeing visions of Beth who tells him that she does not want him to get revenge for her murder, but he ignores them. Nick tracks down Ethan and ties him up and makes him delete all the photos and everyone he sent it to. Hannah cannot forgive her mother for abandoning her family many years ago and does not want anything to do with her. Richard, her new husband, sets her and Gabe up with a flight and access to their house in Puerto Rico. Back in New York, Tim finds out about Kayla's wrongdoings and punishes her while she continues to ice him out. Jordan later taunts Mitch outside his house. Mitch goes to Eddie's house to talk about Jordan when they are attacked with a decapitated pig head and threatened by Jordan for Sam's name. Nick does not trust Ethan, so he kills him and buries his body. Kayla confronts Tim and wants nothing to do with him since he was cheating on her mom which indirectly caused her mother to die. Kayla once again turns to Nick and almost finds him with blood on himself before they have sex again.
6	6	"Chapter 6: Guilt"	Jeff T. Thomas	Mary Leah Sutton	December 6, 2018
Nick is still posing as Ethan in his phone and text messages. Mitch gives Eddie $4,000 so he and Carla can get out of town. Kayla skips school yet again and spends the day with Nick. Things are going well until he tells her he loves her. Jordan once again taunts Mitch, leading to him warning Sam about Jordan's actions. In North Carolina, Hannah and Gabe are prepared to leave, until police officers show up looking to take them back to New York. They beg their mother to hide them, but she sells them out. Kayla later breaks up with Nick because she cannot be a part of a relationship with all that is going on. Nick takes the news very badly and physically harms himself, before approaching Tim at the restaurant bar. Hannah and Gabe realize that they are not with actual police officers but with men working for the people after them. Hannah manages to choke the driver and cause the car to flip many times and down a hill. Jordan taunts and threatens Eddie, leading Eddie to shoot through the door. He is horrified to find he accidentally shot and killed Carla. Heartbroken and overcome with guilt, Eddie commits suicide by shooting himself in the head, as Jordan knows what he has done.
7	7	"Chapter 7: Betrayal"	Millicent Shelton	Andrea Thornton Bolden	December 13, 2018
The police believe that Eddie killed Carla because he was loaded. Jordan refuses to give up his quest for revenge and wants to go after and kill the two remaining "Little Pigs", something that is hindered when he begins to see and talk to Eddie as his moral compass. Kayla confronts Nick about stalking Tim at the restaurant and warns him to have nothing to do with her. Hannah and Gabe manage to escape the men with the money but are later hunted through the woods by one of them. Hannah buries the money and defeats her attacker while Gabe makes it to a rest stop where he is drugged and kidnapped by Esther, who is working with the company. Garcia questions the story. Jordan kidnaps Shelley and wants Sam's name in return for her. Mitch alerts Sam and they go to the trade-off together. Sam instead kills both Shelley and Mitch and attempts to kill Jordan. Also, Kayla and Laney investigate Nick, where they learn he is using his brother's name and is from Florida, his real name being Joshua. Hannah looks for Gabe and is attacked by one of the men. She kills him and Esther calls and tells her they will be in contact with her. Kayla is horrified to find Nick has one of her mother's paintings in his closet.
8	8	"Chapter 8: Truth"	John Stuart Scott	Steve Stringer	December 20, 2018
Kayla tells Nick to leave her alone. Abby is shown having an affair with Nick, who was obsessed with her. Tim tried to confront Abby about the affair, but she had to leave to break it off with Nick. When she tried to break it off, he grew violent, which led Abby to run away. He began to pursue her in a high-speed car chase, causing her to wreck her car. She was badly injured and asked Nick to help her, but he killed her. Garcia questions Jordan, who she believes is killing for revenge. Jordan is horrified when Sam enters, who is a detective and investigating Garcia's case and knows all of Jordan's information. Gabe is held and tortured by Esther who wants the money. Hannah eventually agrees to give them the money for Gabe. Sam later confronts Jordan and proposes a truce, as he knows he would not be able to frame anyone for Jordan's murder. Gabe escapes from the basement he is being held in. When he finds himself in a restaurant kitchen and runs into Katrina, he begs her to help him and is horrified when she has two men tie him up again, revealing herself to be the buyer all along.
9	9	"Chapter 9: Deception"	Adam Davidson	Heather Zuhlke	December 27, 2018
Jordan attempts to kidnap Sam's son as "Mr. Wolf". He realizes he has gone too far and calls Tim for help. Katrina and Esther plan to kill Gabe, while Hannah and Terry plan their defense. Nick lures Laney to an abandoned building and forces her to lure Kayla there. Garcia has been growing suspicious of Sam, believing he is dirty. Jordan tells Garcia everything and she says she will charge Sam the next day. Kayla comes to Nick's apartment, but he locks Kayla in so they can talk about a trip. She distracts him, stabs him, finds Laney has been murdered, and escapes. She calls the police and tells them everything. Hannah meets at the trade-off and she and Terry kill all but one of the many henchmen. She follows him back to the hotel where Katrina is. Katrina calls her and threatens her, while Hannah tells her that she plans to kill her and get her brother back. Garcia is murdered by Olsen, who is one of Sam's men. Nick gets Colleen to give him a disguise at her costume shop and then knocks her out and puts her into a suitcase. He then, under a new identity, checks into the hotel, bringing the suitcase with him.
10	10	"Chapter 10: Forgiveness"	Craig Zisk	Kevin Williamson & Mary Leah Sutton	January 3, 2019
Jordan breaks into Sam's house and steals the diamonds. Nick demands to Kayla that they meet. Katrina is facing pressure from Sam for the money and kidnaps Hannah. Jordan calls the dirty Olsen and tells him he believes Sam killed Garcia and tells him he has the diamonds. Kayla meets with Nick and he tells her that he killed her mother, Abby. He explains he loved her so much since she gave him Kayla, that he followed her to New York, forced his way into the job as her teacher, and that he had been stalking her from the very beginning. Kayla promises to go anywhere with him if he lets Colleen go. He initially agrees but sets the room on fire. Tim has followed Kayla there and frees them. Jordan manages to escape. Hannah and Gabe escape from the basement and they kill Katrina. Jordan almost shoots Sam but he sees Beth, who distracts him, and Sam shoots him dead. Sam escapes but ends up getting hit and killed by a car. Jordan reunites with Beth in the afterlife. Kayla is again attacked by Nick. A fight ensues during which Nick falls down the stairs to his death.

=== Season 2 (2019–20) ===
No. overall	No. in season	Title	Directed by	Written by	Original release date
11	1	"The Curse"	Jeff T. Thomas	Kevin Williamson & Mary Leah Sutton	December 5, 2019
In Nashville, Tennessee, Tucker, a writer, and his fiance Maddie, a lawyer, are a couple at their peak. Maddie is called in to bail her alcoholic brother and struggling musician, Jackson, out of jail. Ashley, Jackson and Maddie's youngest sister, is a famous country/pop singer releasing her first album. After her release party, she is locked in her car which catches fire. She escapes as the car blows up, having been rigged with a bomb. Half her body on her right side is burned badly. Three months later, Tucker cannot sleep or write. He is following Olivia around and breaks into her house, obsessed with her. Maddie questions Tucker if they should not get married. Ashley's manager/mother, Rebecca, is worried about if she will sing again. Ashley is watched by Beau, a former policeman on leave. Jackson meets and becomes infatuated with Simone, a young woman with a secret. Kyle, a fan of Ashley's, is seen naked burning his body with candles while singing her music.
12	2	"Writer's Block"	Solvan "Slick" Naim	Steve Stringer	December 12, 2019
Maddie feels it may be wrong to marry Tucker and tells him to fix his problems. Simone attends the funeral of her father and clashes with her step family. Her godmother Cora tells her she thinks her father was murdered by his wife Veronica. Ashley is upset that her mother and her manager Damien want her to do press for her new personal single after the tragedy. Beau helps Ashley realize she can control her own career and life, so she agrees to do a radio interview which backfires on her. Elsewhere, Kyle romances Susie, Ashley's best friend and personal assistant. Jackson finds Simone to give her her missing bracelet and they end up having sex. Also, Tucker grows more obsessed with Olivia. He spies on her and uses her real life story as inspiration for his writing. Growing obsessed with her, he kidnaps her and chains her to a bed in the soundproof dungeon of a rural house.
13	3	"Family Business"	Anne Hamilton	Sylvia L. Jones	December 19, 2019
Ashley is horrified to find that Kyle has sent her a sinister note and thinks her attacker is coming for her again. Olivia wakes up horrified in her dungeon. Tucker tries to calm her down, saying they cannot start a relationship this way. Ashley learns that she has been receiving numerous hateful threats. Olivia thinks she will be found, but Tucker has thought it all, avoided all cameras, and tells her that nobody will miss her. Simone attends her father's will reading and is left with nothing. Simone openly accuses Veronica of killing her father in order for she and her sons to get the family's money.... which Simone casually denies. Beau and Ashley are stalked by Kyle when they take an excursion from Ashley's house. Maddie is growing away from Tucker, but growing closer to Brendon, who reignites their relationship by having sex at a party. Ashley publicly thanks the man who saved her life. Veronica's sons try to pay off Simone to leave town, who declines the money and is warned by them that if she does not leave things will get bad. Jackson is visited by Simone at his loft and they end up having sex again. Olivia tries to escape, breaking Tucker's rule, but is stopped and attacked by Tucker. He yanks her outside and reveals that under each of his two white rose gardens lies a woman he murdered and buried. He tells her to listen or he would hate for her to end up like them.
14	4	"Number One Fan"	David Grossman	Hollie Overton	December 26, 2019
After their date, Kyle copies Susie's car keys and stows-away in it to Ashley's house. Ashley and Beau grow closer, upsetting Ken. Tucker warns Olivia to cooperate, saying they need each other, and he needs her as his writing subject. He gets her to reveal that she once had a boyfriend, named Luke, who tragically died. Elsewhere, Simone tells Cora her risky plan to look for an original copy of her father's Will to expose Veronica's scheme. Maddie and Tucker attend lunch with Tucker's parents where they slip up and reveal to Maddie that Tucker accidentally killed his sister when he was younger. Also, Simone and Jackson break into her dad's office to look for evidence and are caught by security, leading Veronica to reveal Simone is an ex-convict and threaten to press charges if she does not leave town. Also, Kyle confronts Ashley, idolizing her and her career. He says he burned himself so she would want him and to be like her and that he would not ever hurt her. He tries to abduct her, leading to Beau shooting him to death. Simone learns that her father was investigating Veronica and that she was cheating on him with someone. Tucker reveals he uses Olivia because she reminds him of his deceased sister, Anna. Beau and Ashley kiss for the first time.
15	5	"New Pages"	Jeff T. Thomas	Treena Hancock & Melissa R. Byer	January 2, 2020
Maddie shares to Brendan that she thinks Tucker is having an affair after hearing Olivia downstairs. Ashley begins to think that Kyle was not the bomber and asks Beau to look into it. Simone and Cora plan to expose Veronica's affair. Ken and Rebecca fire Beau after his kiss with Ashley. Tucker asks Olivia about her and Luke's dangerous past, while Olivia thinks she is a replacement for Anna. Ashley meets with the police, who dismiss her concerns. Beau finds footage revealing the bomber of Ashley's car. Simone confronts Veronica, who only rebukes her, and is attacked by Ron to leave. Brendan meets with Tucker and confronts him. Tucker leaves in a hurry after he sees Olivia supposedly hanging herself; Brendan follows him. Jackson finds Simone's glass shoe and Simone missing. Beau and Ken confront the bomber - Dillon Young, a shootout takes place and Ken is shot. Olivia attacks Tucker and with Brendan's help she escapes, but Brendan is captured.
16	6	"Lost and Found"	Millicent Shelton	Mark Hudis	January 9, 2020
Tucker chases Olivia through the woods and she is hurt. Jackson and Derek (after learning of Simone's blackmail) learn that Simone has been taken by Ron, who gives her up to people who want her dead back home as she owes money. Ken survives the shooting, but Gwen says Beau is not allowed to work on the case. Tucker knows he is past fixing the situation and kills Brendan. Ashley's singing voice comes back. Jackson saves Simone from being killed by the thugs after her. Beau tracks Dillon down and learns he was hired to kill Ashley, but he is shot dead by Gwen before he can reveal who hired him. Simone finds Cora murdered in her apartment. Olivia returns to Tucker's house and attacks him, hitting him in the head repeatedly. Olivia reveals she was in an abusive relationship with Luke: one day, after having enough, she hit him in the head and watched him die, refusing to call for help. Olivia chains Tucker up while smiling evilly, revealing that she is just as dangerously disturbed and vile as he is.
17	7	"Thorns and All"	Jeff T. Thomas	Mary Leah Sutton	January 16, 2020
Olivia has Tucker chained and drugged in his own basement, warning him that he kidnapped the wrong woman. Simone, distraught by Cora's murder, tells Jackson she was only using him and breaks things off. Gwen is weary to keep Beau in the loop. Veronica questions Derek and Ron, feeling they have murdered Cora, whom both deny it. Ashley learns she is healing fast and can sing again. Veronica has Maddie represent Simone to be her legal council. Olivia taunts Tucker, who finally realizes that she is MORE insane than he is. Tucker swears to her that she is not a killer; Olivia asks him if he is sure about that, as she begins to act and talk with a sociopathic manner. Distraught over Simone breaking up with him, Jackson relapses into drugs and partying. Olivia forces Tucker to break up with Maddie. Ashley and Rebecca plan to make her career about talent rather than looks. Veronica invites Simone to live with her, wanting to start a family. Jackson shows up home drunk, and it's revealed that Mr. Pruitt died from driving drunk; a fate Rebecca saves him from too. Olivia tells Tucker that he picked her by fate, that she has killed more people aside from Luke, and they can help each other. Simone vows to Derek that she will not fight anymore. Ashley and Beau decide to make things serious. Olivia lurks in the shadows, following Maddie.
18	8	"Sweet Dreams"	Kevin Tancharoen	Brian Millikin	January 23, 2020
Olivia drugs Tucker and threatens to kill Maddie if he does not comply with her plans. Ashley wants to get back to performing. Tucker has continuous nightmares where he relives the days after Anna's death. Beau has been invited back onto the Nashville PD. Olivia visits Maddie's office, posing under the name Rachel. Ashley receives a threat sent to her house, warning her not to perform. Olivia takes Maddie out for drinks and tries to learn more information about Tucker, particularly his insomnia. Gwen warns Tucker that someone is after him. Ashley and Damian plan her comeback, which both think will be legendary. Brendan's wife is looking for him, and she asks Maddie if Tucker knows what happened to him. Jackson begins attending AA meetings. Simone confronts Clay about changing the trust and sleeping with Veronica. Moments later, Clay is thrown from the top of his office building... murdered by an unseen person. Maddie makes her way to Tucker's house and finds "Rachel" there, who reveals her identity. Olivia shares with Maddie that she needs to know who her husband is. Beau is run into and knocked out by a reckless car. The driver of the car is revealed to be Taylor who has been obsessively researching and following every member of the Pruitt family.
19	9	"Favorite Son"	Jeff T. Thomas	Teleplay by : Treena Hancock & Melissa R. Byer; Story by : Hollie Overton	January 30, 2020
Olivia reveals Tucker's transgressions to Maddie. Olivia knocks her out and chains her up. Beau survives the car accident. Jackson befriends Donna, a woman at AA. Olivia puts the captive Tucker and Maddie through her version of therapy. Gwen questions Veronica, believing she has been the murderer all along. Ashley meets with the press and prepares for her concert. Derek tells Simone he thinks Ron murdered Cora. Jackson mends fences with Rebecca. Maddie has no choice but to believe Olivia after realizing that it's his house with the chains and soundproofing. She also learns that Tucker's problems all root from his sister Anna and that he has killed other women before. Taylor plants her car and evidence on a friend of Dillon's, making Gwen and Beau think it's all over. Ron reveals it was both he and Derek who changed the trust for Veronica. As he complains to Derek, Derek reveals that he killed Frank, who threatened to leave. He then kills Ron. Olivia gets Tucker to reveal they both know he now wants to kill Maddie because she knows the truth. A cop looking for Brendan runs into Olivia and finds her suspicious, so she kills him. Tucker and Maddie break free from their chains. Donna's daughter is revealed to be Taylor, and they are both planning to kill Ashley with a second bombing.
20	10	"Ever After"	Jeff T. Thomas	Mark Hudis & Michael Peterson	February 6, 2020
Olivia wounds Tucker, leaving Maddie to figure out their escape. Rebecca finally mends fences with Ashley and her career. Beau officially returns to the Nashville police force. Donna and Taylor want Rebecca and the Pruitts to pay for ruining their family. Donna does not want to hurt Ashley again, and trying to stop her leads Taylor to accidentally kill her. Simone realizes Derek's guilt as he kidnaps Jackson and orders her to meet. Veronica goes to the holdup and Derek confesses everything to her, horrified, she calls the police to turn him in. Olivia plans to burn everyone in a house fire as she thanks Tucker for helping her realize who she is. Everyone escapes the fire and a fight ensues at the dock. Olivia tries to drown Maddie, but Tucker saves her and seemingly drowns Olivia. Ashley performs a stripped down song to positive reception before Taylor attacks, captures her and holds her and Rebecca at gunpoint. Taylor reveals she is Ashley's half sister on her father's side and is angry that she grew up with nothing and Ashley had it all. Beau saves Ashley just in time but gets shot by Taylor who is arrested. At the hospital, Maddie shares everything with Rebecca. Veronica tells Simone she will give her the business and the real trust as Simone asks if they can have a fresh start. Jackson and Simone reunite and get back together. Beau survives his wounds and he and Ashley stay together for good. At the hospital, Tucker is in a coma from brain damage and will not ever wake up again. He constantly relives a nightmare on loop. Maddie finds roses delivered to Tucker's room with the message "Sweet Dreams", which are from Olivia, who has survived.

== Music ==
Musical performances were featured throughout the series' second season, all performed by Natalie Alyn Lind. On February 11, 2020, CBS All Access released the official soundtrack containing full versions of the second season's songs.

=== Season 2 ===
Tell Me a Story (Season 2) (Original Series Soundtrack)
No.	Title	Artist(s)	Length
1.	"Wash You Away"	Natalie Alyn Lind	2:53
2.	"Nobody Knows"	Natalie Alyn Lind	3:00
3.	"I'm Not the Same as I Used to Be"	Natalie Alyn Lind	3:00

== Production ==
=== Development ===
On November 30, 2017, it was announced that CBS All Access had given Tell Me a Story a series order. The show is being developed for American audiences by Kevin Williamson and is based on the Spanish television series Érase una vez created by Marcos Osorio Vidal. Williamson is also set to write the series and executive produce it alongside Aaron Kaplan and Dana Honor. The series is being produced by Kaplan's production company Kapital Entertainment. On May 9, 2018, it was reported that Liz Friedlander would direct and executive produce the first two episodes. On December 17, 2018, it was announced that the series had been renewed for a second season. On May 11, 2020, the series was canceled after two seasons.

=== Casting ===
In May 2018, it was announced that Billy Magnussen and Kim Cattrall had been cast in the series' lead roles. In June 2018, it was reported that Danielle Campbell, Paul Wesley, James Wolk, Dania Ramirez, and Sam Jaeger had joined the main cast. In July 2018, it was announced that Davi Santos, Zabryna Guevara, and Dorian Missick had been cast in series regular roles. In August 2018, it was reported that Michael Raymond-James, Kurt Yaeger, Rarmian Newton, and Paulina Singer had joined the cast in a recurring capacity.

=== Filming ===
Principal photography for season one began on June 28, 2018, in New York City, New York. and ended in early November 2018. Filming for season two began on July 1, 2019 in Nashville, Tennessee, and wrapped on December 18, 2019.

== Release ==
On August 5, 2018, it was announced during the Television Critics Association's annual summer press tour that the series would premiere on October 31, 2018. The second season premiered on December 5, 2019. The day of the series cancellation, The CW picked-up the television broadcast rights to the first two seasons. The first season premiered on July 28, 2020, followed by the second on October 13, 2020.

=== Marketing ===
On July 19, 2018, the series held a panel at San Diego Comic-Con in San Diego, California moderated by Entertainment Weekly's Henry Goldblatt and featuring executive producer Kevin Williamson as well as series stars Paul Wesley and James Wolk. The panel included the premiere of an exclusive teaser trailer for the series. On August 5, 2018, a "sneak peek" trailer for the series was released. On October 5, 2018, the official trailer for the series was released, first premiering during the series' panel at the annual New York Comic Con.

=== Premiere ===
On October 23, 2018, the series held its official premiere at the Metrograph theater in New York City, New York. Those in attendance included creator Kevin Williamson, executive producer Dana Honor, and cast members Becki Newton, Danielle Campbell, Dania Ramirez, and James Wolk.

== Reception ==
=== Critical response ===
The series has been met with a mixed response from critics upon its premiere. Based on 15 reviews, the first season holds a 60% approval rating on Rotten Tomatoes with an average rating of 5.42 out of 10. The website's critical consensus reads, "Despite an enticing cast and promising premise, Tell Me a Story's overly plotted, grim take on Grimm's Fairy Tales fails to enchant." Metacritic, which uses a weighted average, assigned the series a score of 45 out of 100 based on 7 critics, indicating "mixed or average reviews".

In a positive review, Refinery29's Sesali Bowen commended the series saying, "Tell Me A Story captures its viewers to put themselves in the shoes of some of their favorite fables with its realism. So far it's better for it. This new CBS All Access program has enough to stand on without it thanks to an array of characters who are interesting if not a little cliche." In a more mixed critique, Variety's offered the series qualified praise saying, "For all its faults, the series is enthusiastically pulpy, moving with a propulsive energy that, to be frank, most streaming dramas lack. It's not nearly operating on the same prescient level as, say, The Good Fight, nor quite the radical re-imagining of fairy tales as advertised. But if nothing else, Tell Me a Story's got a wicked bite that might serve it well when trying to grab curious viewers on a streaming platform that doesn't quite have anything else like it." In an outright negative assessment, RogerEbert.com's Brian Tallerico criticized the series saying, "There are talented TV veterans in Tell Me a Story, likely lured by Williamson's pedigree, but even they fail to give what could reasonably be called good performances. The pacing, the dialogue, the (complete lack of) visual language, the world building—it's impossible to point to a single element that works."

== Home media ==
The first season was released on DVD in Region 1 on October 1, 2019.

In 2023, Paramount+ removed the show from its website.
