= Sonny with a Chance (soundtrack) =

Soundtrack album by Various artists
- Released: October 5, 2010
- Recorded: 2008–2010
- Genres: Pop, pop rock
- Length: 28:22
- Label: Walt Disney
- Producers: Antonina Armato; Tim James; The Matrix; Adrian Gurvitz; Jeannie Lurie; Chen Neeman; Aristeidis Archontis; Adam Anders; Cave Dooley; Marshall Allman

Sonny with a Chance is the soundtrack album from the Disney Channel Original Series of the same name, released on October 5, 2010 by Walt Disney Records, during season two. It features lead vocals from American actors and singers Demi Lovato, Sterling Knight, Tiffany Thornton, and pop rock band Allstar Weekend.

The theme song, titled "So Far, So Great", was featured in Disney Channel Playlist, released on June 9, 2009, and later featured on Lovato's second studio album, Here We Go Again, as a bonus track. "Me, Myself and Time" was released as a promotional single on August 3, 2010.

== Background ==
Four out of the nine total tracks on the soundtrack are performed by the series' star, Demi Lovato. Co-stars Tiffany Thornton and Sterling Knight each perform two tracks. Hollywood Records group Allstar Weekend appears once on the soundtrack. The theme song, "So Far, So Great", written by Aristeidis Archontis, Jeannie Lurie and Chen Neeman, was the first song from the album to be released, on January 28, 2009, days before the series premiered. It was performed in the Summer Tour 2009.

"Me, Myself and Time", performed by Lovato, was released as a promotional single on August 3, 2010, the only one from the soundtrack. It was featured in the episode "Sonny with a Song", of the second season, and was later sent to Radio Disney. It is the first track of the soundtrack, written by Antonina Armato, Tim James and Devrim Karaoglu. The song peaked at number seven on the US Billboard Bubbling Under Hot 100 Singles chart, and charted on the US Hot Digital Songs chart and in its Canadian counterpart.

== Critical reception ==
Professional ratings
Review scores
Source	Rating
AllMusic	2/5 stars

Andrew Leahey of AllMusic believed that Tiffany Thornton and Sterling Knight "both deserve kudos for co-writing their own tunes, but that doesn't overshadow the fact that most of the material here is formulaic pop/rock, stripped of anything unique or different from other Disney albums." Leahey noted that the music was played by session musicians who were not listed within the show's credits, and wrote "it doesn't reflect well on Lovato, who has the most to lose as an aspiring musician when albums like this are released."

== Commercial performance ==
The soundtrack debuted at number 163 on the Billboard 200, and charted for one week. It has also peaked at number 3 on the US Kid Albums and at number 8 on the US Top Soundtracks.

== Track listing ==
Standard edition
No.	Title	Writer(s)	Artist	Length
1.	"Me, Myself and Time"	Antonina Armato, Tim James, Devrim Karaoglu	Demi Lovato	3:47
2.	"Hanging"	Lauren Christy, Graham Edwards, Scott Spock, Knight	Sterling Knight	2:58
3.	"Kiss Me"	Adrian Gurvitz, Thornton	Tiffany Thornton	3:34
4.	"What to Do"	Jeannie Lurie, Aris Archontis, Chen Neeman	Demi Lovato	3:03
5.	"How We Do This"	Christy, Edwards, Spock, Knight	Sterling Knight	2:52
6.	"Work of Art"	Adam Anders, Nikki Hasman, Pam Sheyne	Demi Lovato	2:56
7.	"Come Down with Love"	Zachary Porter, Nathan Darmody, Mike Daly	Allstar Weekend	3:05
8.	"Sure Feels Like Love"	Marshall Altman, Jeff Cohen, Thornton	Tiffany Thornton	3:43
9.	"So Far So Great"	Lurie, Archontis, Neeman	Demi Lovato	2:14

Brazilian and Polish edition bonus tracks
No.	Title	Artist	Length
10.	"Meet You Later"	Andressa Andreatto	2:59
11.	"Time to Shine"	Agnieszka Mrozińska	2:29

== Personnel ==
Credits adapted from AllMusic.

- Demi Lovato – lead vocals
- Zachary Porter – lead vocals
- Cameron Quiseng – bass guitar, backing vocals
- Michael Martinez – drums, percussion
- Nathan Darmody – guitar, backing vocals
- Marshall Altman – composition, production
- Adam Anders – composition, production
- Aristeidis Archontis – mixing, production, composition
- Antonina Armato – composition, production
- Lauren Christy – composition
- Jeff Cohen – composition
- Rich Costey – mixing
- Mike Daly – vocal production, composition
- Chris DeStefano – mixing
- Dave Dooley – production
- Graham Edwards – mixing, composition
- Steve Gerdes – creative direction
- Adrian Gurvitz – composition, production
- Nikki Hassman – composition
- Tim James – mixing, composition, production
- Devrim Karaoglu – composition
- Sterling Knight – lead vocals, composition
- Jeannie Lurie – composition, production
- Brian Malouf – executive production, mixing
- Stephen Marcussen – mastering
- Chen Neeman – composition, production
- Eric Robinson – mixing
- Pamela Sheyne – composition
- Anabel Sinn – design
- Scott Spock – composition
- Tiffany Thornton – lead vocals

== Charts ==
Chart performance for Sonny with a Chance
Chart (2010)	Peak position
US Billboard 200	163
US Kid Albums (Billboard)	3
US Top Soundtracks (Billboard)	8
