= Cuéntame un cuento (TV series) =

Spanish television series

- Genre: Anthology
- Based on: The Three Little Pigs; Snow White; Little Red Riding Hood; Hansel and Gretel; Beauty and the Beast
- Directed by: Miguel Ángel Vivas; Iñaki Peñafiel; Fernando Bassi; Salvador Calvo; Alberto Ruiz Rojo
- Starring: Víctor Clavijo; Antonio Gil; Arturo Valls; Iñaki Font; Blanca Suárez; Mar Saura; Laia Costa; Blanca Portillo; Marcel Borràs; Aitana Hercal; Aitor Luna; Michelle Jenner; Laura Pamplona
- Country of origin: Spain
- Original language: Spanish
- No. of seasons: 1
- No. of episodes: 5

Production
- Executive producers: Edi Walter; Fernando Bassi
- Production company: Eyeworks España

Original release
- Network: Antena 3
- Release: 10 November – 8 December 2014

Related
- Tell Me a Story

Cuéntame un cuento (English: Tell me a story) is a Spanish anthology television series. It consists of twisted remakes of traditional fairy tales in a modern-day setting.

In 2018, the American television series Tell Me a Story, based on Cuéntame un cuento, premiered.

== Premise ==
The series attempted to retell old fairy tales "to show its relevance in the 21st century with a new approach".

== Cast ==
Los tres cerditos

- Víctor Clavijo as Andrés.
- Antonio Gil as Chino.
- Arturo Valls as Nano.
- Iñaki Font as Rulo.
- Elena Ballesteros as Elena.
- Luis Zahera as Ramírez.

Blancanieves

- Blanca Suárez as Nieves.
- Mar Saura as Eva.
- Guillermo Barrientos as Diego.
- Félix Gómez as Marko.

Caperucita roja

- Laia Costa as Claudia.
- Lola Cordón as Claudia's grand mother.
- Adolfo Fernández as Joaquín.
- Sonia Almarcha as Claudia's mother.
- Sara Mata as Claudia's cousin.
- Susana Abaitua as Claudia's friend.
- Javier Godino as Antonio.
- Nicolás Coronado as Fran.

Hansel y Gretel

- Blanca Portillo as Sara Morgade (la bruja)
- Marcel Borràs as Hansel
- Aitana Hercal as Gretel

La bella y la bestia

- Aitor Luna as Iván Dorado.
- Michelle Jenner as Miranda.
- Laura Pamplona as Diana.

== Production and release ==
Produced by Eyeworks España for Antena 3, Edi Walter and Fernando Bassi were credited as executive producers. "Los tres cerditos" was directed by Miguel Ángel Vivas, "Blancanieves" by Iñaki Peñafiel, "Caperucita Roja" by Fernando Bassi, "Hansel y Gretel" by Salvador Calvo, and "La bella y la bestia" by Alberto Ruiz Rojo. Shot in 2011, the series was shelved by Antena 3 for a while. The broadcasting run lasted from 10 November 2014 to 8 December 2014.

The series sparked an American remake developed by Kevin Williamson: Tell Me a Story.

Series	Episodes	Originally released			Viewers	Share (%)	Ref.
Series	Episodes	First released	Last released	Network	Viewers	Share (%)	Ref.
1	5	10 November 2014	8 December 2014	Antena 3	2,337,000	12.7	

No. in season	Title	Directed by	Viewers	Original release date	Share (%)
1	"Los tres cerditos"	Miguel Ángel Vivas	2,736,000	10 November 2014	14.5
2	"Blancanieves"	Iñaki Peñafiel	2,468,000	17 October 2014	13.4
3	"Caperucita Roja"	Fernando Bassi	2,300,000	24 October 2014	12.5
4	"Hansel y Gretel"	Salvador Calvo	2,062,000	1 December 2014	11.3
5	"La bella y la bestia"	Alberto Ruiz Rojo	2,120,000	8 December 2014	12.0

== Awards and nominations ==
Year	Award	Category	Nominee(s)	Result	Ref.
2014	16th Luchon Film Festival	Best Spanish Fiction	"Los tres cerditos"	Won	
2015	24th Actors and Actresses Union Awards	Best Television Actor in a Leading Role	Víctor Clavijo	Won	
