= All the Way (Allstar Weekend album) =

Studio album by Allstar Weekend
- Released: September 27, 2011
- Recorded: 2010–2011
- Genre: Pop rock; pop punk; electronica
- Length: 40:34
- Label: Hollywood

Allstar Weekend chronology
Suddenly Yours (2010)	All the Way (2011)	The American Dream (2012)

Singles from All the Way
- 1. "Not Your Birthday" Released: March 22, 2011; 2. "Blame It on September" Released: August 16, 2011

All the Way is the second and final studio album by the American pop rock band Allstar Weekend. It was released on September 27, 2011, via Hollywood Records. It was also their final album to feature guitarist Nathan Darmody, who left the band 10 days before it was released.

The album is preceded by the lead single, "Not Your Birthday", released on March 22, 2011. The album's second single, "Blame It on September" was released on August 16, 2011.

There has been some controversy surrounding the song "Not Your Birthday", because that song had profanity parents considered inappropriate for young listeners, especially for a group endorsed by Disney Channel. Despite this, the album was released without a Parental Advisory sticker. Also, because Radio Disney had released a clean version of the single, that replaces the explicit lyrics and lyrics that mention drinking, especially during Anth's rap.

The album debuted at #49 on the Top Billboard 200 Chart in the US, and #71 in Canada.

== Singles ==
The album's first single, "Not Your Birthday", was released on March 22, 2011. The music video premiered on VEVO on March 4, 2011, prior to the actual song being released. It was featured in the movie Prom.

The album's second single, "Blame It on September", was released on August 16, 2011. They shot the music video in Toronto, Ontario and it premiered on VEVO on September 23, 2011.

== Track listing ==
Below is the track listing for the album.

No.	Title	Writer(s)	Producer(s)	Length
1.	"Mr. Wonderful"	Zachary Porter, JP Clark, Jayce Levi	S*A*M & Sluggo	3:20
2.	"Bend or Break"	Clark, Levi, Porter, Joseph Raposo	JP, JAYCE	3:30
3.	"Not Your Birthday"	Busbee, Clark, Levi, Anthony Melo	Busbee	3:27
4.	"Do It 2 Me"	Clark, Porter, Levi, Busbee	Busbee	3:20
5.	"Blame It on September"	Porter, Nathan Darmody, Mike Daly, Travis Huff, John Fields	John Fields	3:39
6.	"Sorry..."	J.R. Rotem, Porter, Alfred Tuohey, Mimoza Blimsson, Chris Fabich, Tobias Zwiefler, Marty James	J.R. Rotem	3:17
7.	"James (Never Change)"	Chistopher J. Baran, Porter, James Bourne	CJ Baran	3:44
8.	"All the Way"	Porter, Levi, Clark	JP, JAYCE	3:22
9.	"When I Get Paid"	Porter, Clark, Levi	S*A*M & Sluggo	3:10
10.	"Undercover"	Porter, Darmody, Dan Wilson	John Feldmann	3:34
11.	"Be There"	Levi, Clark	Marek Pompetzki, Paul NZA, Cecil Remmler	2:52
12.	"Teenage Hearts"	Porter, Ben Charles, Jim Wes, Aaron Harmon	John Fields	3:22
Total length:				40:34

iTunes bonus tracks
No.	Title	Length
13.	"Bend or Break" (alternate version)	4:03
14.	"James (Never Change)" (alternate version)	3:44
15.	"Not Your Birthday" (Touch Bass Remix)	5:47

== Charts ==
Chart performance for All the Way
Chart (2011)	Peak position
Canadian Albums (Nielsen SoundScan)	71
US Billboard 200	49
