= Yin Chang =

American actress

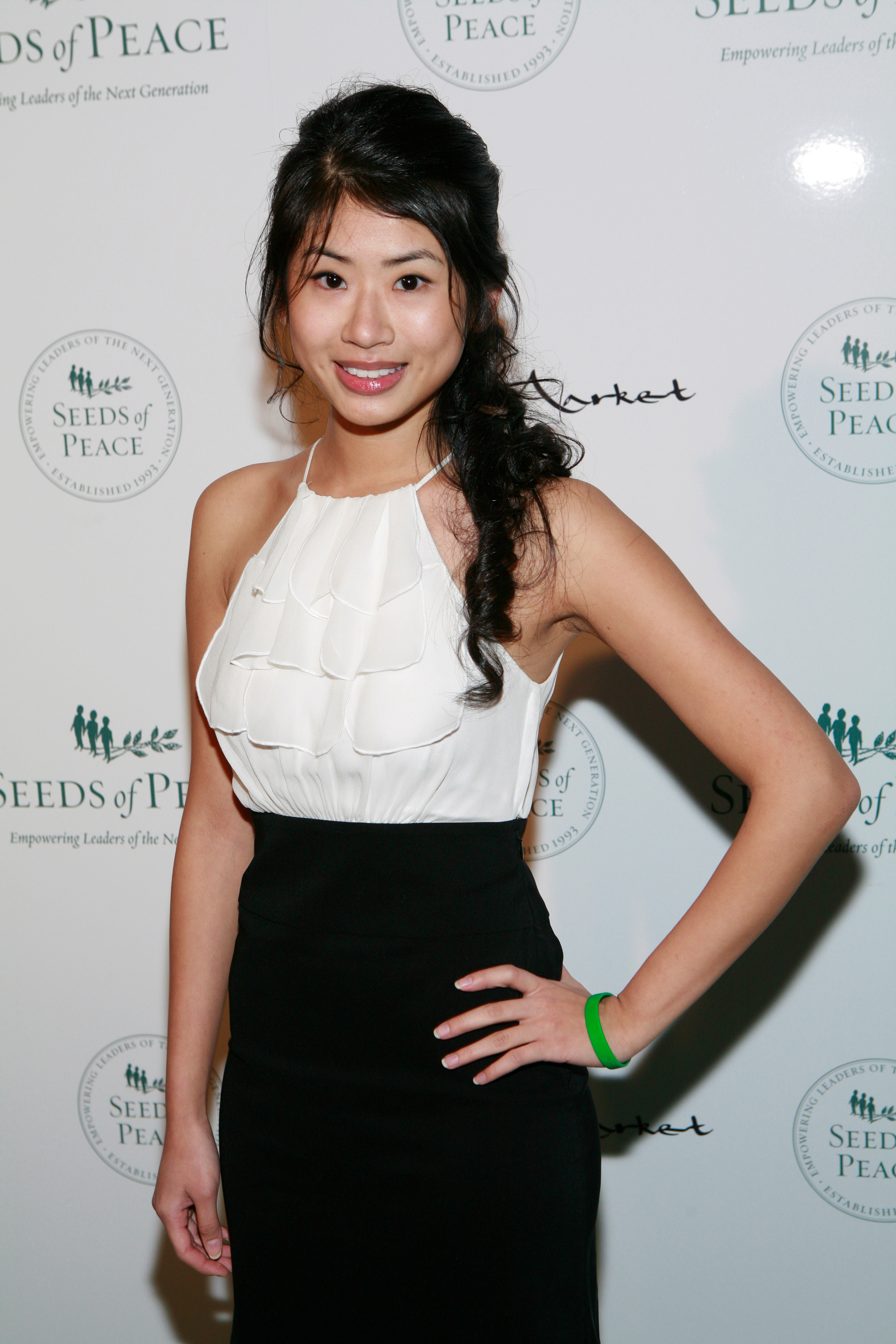
- Chang in 2009
- Born: 23 April 1989 (age 35); New York City, U.S.
- Occupation: Actress
- Years active: 2006–present

Yin Chang (born April 23, 1989) is an American actress, known for her lead role as Mei Kwan in the 2011 film Prom and her recurring role as Nelly Yuki on The CW's teen drama series Gossip Girl. Chang has made guest appearances on the television shows Six Degrees, Law & Order: Special Victims Unit, Law & Order: Criminal Intent, and Love Bites. Some of her other works are several national commercials such as Time Warner, Verizon Wireless, MasterCard, Best Buy, MTV, and Mead School Supplies.

Chang was born and raised in New York City, and is of Taiwanese, Chinese, and Malaysian Chinese ancestry. Her father is from Taiwan and her mother from Malaysia. Her maternal grandfather was artist Dr. Teng Beng Chew.

== Filmography ==
=== Film ===
Year	Title	Role	Notes
2007	Lawrence	A girl	Short film
2007	Paper Girl	Peiyu	Short film
2011	Prom	Mei Kwan	
2011	The Bling Ring	Natalie Kim	Television film
2013	Cause of Death	Girl in the park	Short film
2013	My Mother Is a Human Being	Sunshine	Short film
2014	A Lesson in Romance	Ashley Moon	Television film

=== Television ===
Year	Title	Role	Notes
2006	Six Degrees	Kaya	2 episodes (1 uncredited)
2007	Law & Order: Special Victims Unit	Chun Hao	Episode: "Outsider"
2007	Law & Order: Criminal Intent	Traci Kwon	Episode: "Offense"
2008–2009, 2012	Gossip Girl	Nelly Yuki	18 episodes
2011	Love Bites	Cara	Episode: "TMI"
2021-2022	Gossip Girl	Nelly Yuki	2 episodes
