= Suddenly (EP) =

EP by Allstar Weekend
- Released: June 21, 2010
- Recorded: 2010
- Genre: Pop rock
- Length: 23:24
- Label: Hollywood

Allstar Weekend chronology
Suddenly (2010)	Suddenly Yours (2010)

Singles from Suddenly
- 1. "A Different Side of Me" Released: March 2, 2010; 2. "Dance Forever" Released: June 7, 2010

Suddenly is the debut extended play by the American pop rock band Allstar Weekend, who were signed with Hollywood Records at the time of release. It was released on June 21, 2010, in the US and on July 20, 2010, in Canada. It has been met with some commercial success, debuting at number 62 on the Billboard 200.

The track "The Weekend" was not released as a single but a music video was made.

== Singles ==
"A Different Side of Me" was released as the first single to Radio Disney during February, 2010. It has made it up the charts on the Radio Disney Countdown to the #1 position. It appears on the soundtrack to the film The Last Song starring Miley Cyrus. The music video contains the four members of the band discovering a castle after running from some sort of get-together. They then explore the castle going their separate ways, while they reveal everything from a princess, to a witch, to an epic sword battle.

"Dance Forever" is the second official single released off the album. The song has made it to #3 on Radio Disney, #16 on Billboard Heatseekers and #45 on Canadian Hot 100. The music video was released June 4, 2010 and takes place in the backyard of a house where a pool party is being thrown and the band is performing. Both the lead vocalist Zachary Porter, and guitarist Nathan Darmody have said that the "Dance Forever" video represents not just one, but all the members of the band's personalities.

== Track listing ==
No.	Title	Writer(s)	Length
1.	"Hey, Princess"	Zachary Porter, Nathan Darmody, Sam Hollander, Dave Katz	3:18
2.	"A Different Side of Me"	Porter, Darmody, Thomas Norris	3:09
3.	"Dance Forever"	Porter, Darmody, Norris	3:42
4.	"Clock Runs Out"	Porter, Darmody, Norris, John Feldmann	3:23
5.	"Amy"	Porter, Darmody, Feldmann	3:46
6.	"Journey to the End of My Life"	Porter, Darmody, Norris, James Bourne	2:52
7.	"The Weekend"	Porter, Darmody, Feldmann	3:18

Walmart exclusive bonus track
No.	Title	Length
8.	"Good Day"

== Charts ==
Chart performance for Suddenly
Chart (2010)	Peak position
Canadian Albums (Nielsen SoundScan)	31
US Billboard 200	62

== Release history ==
Release history for Suddenly
Region	Date	Label
United States	June 21, 2010	Hollywood
Canada	July 20, 2010	Hollywood
