= Nolan Sotillo =

American actor and singer-songwriter (born 1994)

- Born: October 2, 1994 (age 31); West Palm Beach, Florida, United States
- Occupations: Singer-songwriter, actor
- Years active: 2010–present

Nolan Andrew Sotillo (born October 2, 1994) is an American actor and singer best known as Jordi Palacios in the Fox drama series Red Band Society, which premiered September 17, 2014.

Originally from West Palm Beach, Florida, Sotillo tested out of high school and moved to Los Angeles to pursue acting.

Sotillo was part of Invasion, a teen musical group. The group included Mathias Anderle, Kenton Duty, John Lindahl, and Nick Dean.

== Discography ==
=== Studio albums ===
Title	Details
At The End Of The Day	Released: October 22, 2021; Format: Digital download, streaming; Label: AMG Records, LLC

=== Extended plays ===
Title	Details
No Love Lost	Released: December 6, 2019; Format: Digital download, streaming; Label: Independent
Prove Me Wrong	Released: July 23, 2021; Format: Digital download, streaming; Label: AMG Records, LLC

=== Singles ===
Title	Year	Album
"I'm Alright"	2010	Non-album singles
"Right Here"	2011	Non-album singles
"Drown (Acoustic)"	2011	Non-album singles
"Stop"	2021	At The End Of The Day
"Prove Me Wrong"	2021	At The End Of The Day
"Run With You"	2021	At The End Of The Day
"Small Town Smaller"	2023	TBA
"Strangers Again"	2023	TBA
"Love In Lubbock"	2024	TBA
"Won't Be Here Long"	2024	TBA
"Night We Met"	2024	TBA
"OK Sooner"	2024	TBA
"Nothin' Bout No One"	2025	TBA

=== Promotional singles ===
Title	Year	Album
"Wasted Nights"	2014	Non-album promotional singles
"Una Noche Más"	2015	Non-album promotional singles
"I'll Be Home For Christmas"	2017	Non-album promotional singles
"I'm Still"	2021	At The End Of The Day

=== Other appearances ===
Title	Year	Other artist(s)	Album
"We Could Be Anything"	2011	—N/a	Prom

=== Music videos ===
Title	Year	Director
"We Could Be Anything"	2011	
"Right Here"	2011	
"Drown"	2011	
"Stop"	2021	
"Prove Me Wrong"	2021	
"Run With You"	2021	
"Small Town Smaller"	2023	

== Filmography ==
Film
Year	Film	Role	Notes
2011	Prom	Lucas Arnez	Main Role
Television
Year	Title	Role	Notes
2011	Corey & Lucas for the Win!	Lucas Arnez	Main Role
2011	Madison High	Colby Baker	Unsold television pilot
2014–2015	Red Band Society	Jordi Palacios	Main Role
