= Action Item =

American pop rock band

- Origin: Bergen County, New Jersey, United States
- Genres: Pop rock
- Years active: 2007-present
- Label: Unsigned
- Members: Brian Cag; Anthony Li; Dan Brozek; David Buczkowski
- Past members: Joe Politz; Mark Shami
- Website: actionitemband.com

Action Item is a four-piece pop rock band based out of Bergen County, New Jersey.

== History ==
Action Item started off as a five-piece consisting of Cag, Li, Brozek, Buczkowski, and Politz. After self-releasing numerous songs via their Myspace page, the four current members of Action Item parted way with Joe Politz, their first vocalist, and started a nearly year-long search for a new permanent vocalist. Eventually, Brian Cag and Anthony Li would take over the vocal duties, oftentimes both singing on the same songs.

In early 2008, Action Item headed to Chicago, Illinois to record their debut EP with Tom Schleiter of Powerspace. The songs recorded during this session would become Action Item's debut EP The World And I.

After the recording of The World And I, Action Item recruited a guitarist/keyboardist/vocalist by the name of Mark Shami, formerly of the Bergen County, NJ band Off Broadway. Shortly thereafter The World And I was released on June 14, 2008.

The band spent the summer of 2008 doing various east coast tours, and played the NJ date of Warped Tour on the Ernie Ball Battle Of The Bands stage.

The band did a YouTube version to their hit song "Brave" with famous YouTubers Kurt Hugo Schneider and Sam Tsui

Nick Jonas helped write and produce Action Item's song 'Learn To Fly (released July 2011), and appeared in the music video along with Drake Bell. The band and Jonas have become good friends.

In 2013, the band released an album entitled Resolution, which reached #72 on the Billboard 200.

In May 2014, over a year and a half later from leaving the Action Item, Mark Shami sat down with Giancarlo Dittamo for his podcast, Pop Cultivation, to discuss his departure.

== Members ==
Current members

- Anthony Li - Vocals/Guitar
- Brian Cag - Vocals/Guitar
- David Buczkowski - Bass
- Dan Brozek - Drums

Touring members

- Jeremy William Smith

Former members

- Mark Shami - Guitar/Keyboards/Vocals

== Discography ==
- The World And I (2008)
- The Stronger the Love (EP) (2010)
- Learn To Fly (EP) (2011)
- Last Day Of Summer (EP) (2012)
- Resolution (2013)
- Great Mission: Life (EP) (2014)
- Great Mission: Love (EP) (2015)

== Singles ==
- Boy With The Microphone (The World And I)
- Somewhere Out There (The Stronger The Love)
- When Everything Falls Back Down (The Stronger The Love)
- Learn To Fly
- Winter Rolls Around
- Marching Band
- Last Day Of Summer
- Brave
- The Start of Something
- We'll Be Fine
