= Prom (film) =

2011 film by Joe Nussbaum

- Theatrical release poster
- Directed by: Joe Nussbaum
- Written by: Katie Wech
- Produced by: Ted Griffin; Justin Springer
- Starring: Aimee Teegarden; Thomas McDonell; Cameron Monaghan; Yin Chang; Nicholas Braun; Dean Norris; Danielle Campbell; Nolan Sotillo; Kylie Bunbury; Christine Elise; Raini Rodriguez
- Cinematography: Byron Shah
- Edited by: Jeffrey M. Werner
- Music by: Deborah Lurie
- Production companies: Walt Disney Pictures; Rickshaw
- Distributed by: Walt Disney Studios; Motion Pictures
- Release date: April 29, 2011
- Running time: 104 minutes
- Country: United States
- Language: English
- Budget: $8 million
- Box office: $10.7 million

Prom is a 2011 American teen romantic comedy film directed by Joe Nussbaum written by Katie Wech and produced by Ted Griffin and Justin Springer. It was released on April 29, 2011, by Walt Disney Pictures. The film was the first major production filmed with Arri Alexa cameras to be released in theatres.

== Plot ==
Nova Prescott is on the prom committee with her friends Mei Kwan, Ali Gomez, Brandon Roberts, and Rolo Banus. Nova hopes Brandon, whom she has a crush on, will ask her to go to the prom. Lloyd Taylor complains to his stepsister, Tess Torres, that he has no date. Mei discovers that she has been accepted at a different university than her boyfriend, Justin Wexler, and worries about telling him. Lucas Arnaz is in love with his lab partner, Simone, and turns to his friend, Corey Doyle, to help him ask her to the prom. The only one who does not care about the prom is Jesse Richter. Principal Dunnan tries to talk but does not get through to him.

Meanwhile, Jordan Lundley finds an earring in her boyfriend's car, Tyler Barso, but he assures her that he's not cheating. To show his love, he takes her on a date in the shed where the prom decorations are stored; Tyler forgot to extinguish one candle before they left, and the shed is burned down. Nova is left to manufacture replacement props alone. The principal, annoyed at Jesse's lack of respect, gives him a choice: either he helps Nova with the rebuild, or he can't graduate. Jesse accepts reluctantly, as does Nova; and realizes they need each other's cooperation.

While Brandon disappoints Nova by not asking her to the prom, she and Jesse grow closer. When Nova discovers that the prom theme of the neighboring school is the same as theirs, Jesse decides to sneak into their school to check it out. However, the security guard notices them, and the police catch them after they escape.

As Lloyd still cannot find a date and becomes frustrated, Lucas asks Simone to a barbecue hosted by his friend Tyler. Tyler tries to talk and flirt with her, but she rejects him because he is dating Jordan. Mei and Justin's relationship reaches its breaking point, and Mei cancels on Justin for fear of telling him about her acceptance. At school, Lucas blows off Corey to spend more time with Simone and invites her to study with him. However, en route to the library, Simone is stopped by Tyler, who convinces her to talk with him about his feelings. Jordan sees the two talking and immediately realizes the situation. After school, Nova apologizes to Jesse for her father's behavior. Later, she brings him along as she goes dress shopping for a second opinion. Back at school, Simone apologizes to Lucas for having ditched him. She surprises him with tickets to a concert, where Stick Hippo (his and Corey's favorite band) is opening. Lucas wants to take Simone instead of Corey, much to his dismay. Jordan dumps Tyler for his unfaithfulness and decides to go to prom alone. This prompts him to ask Simone to prom, which is on the same night as the concert, and she agrees. Simone tells Lucas that she cannot attend the concert.

Mei apologizes to Justin and tells him the truth, but instead of feeling hurt, he tells her he is proud of her, and agrees to attend prom together. As Lloyd gets rejected by another girl, he spots Lucas sitting outside the school, looking dejected. He learns of his situation and tells Lucas his own problem. Two nights before the prom, Nova, Ali, and Mei are in Nova's room, chatting. Nova confesses to them that she has feelings for Jesse, which her father overhears. The next day, Nova's father tells Jesse he cannot ask Nova to prom because he is "bringing her down". That afternoon, Jesse is unusually hostile towards Nova and deserts her. On prom night, Lucas climbs a tree to reach Simone's window. He tells her how he feels and begs her not to go to prom, but she does anyway. Disappointed, Lucas realizes what a bad friend he has been to Corey and offers him the other concert ticket.

At her house, Nova is heartbroken. Her father explains that he was the one who told Jesse not to ask her to prom. Angered, Nova storms out of the house. At Lloyd's house, it is revealed that he is taking his sister to prom. At Jesse's house, his mother talks with him, and he realizes that he should still take Nova to prom. At the school, Tyler leads Simone into the building and almost immediately abandons her. Simone finds out that it was actually Jordan who dumped Tyler, and Tyler had gone to her with no other option. As Tyler and Jordan are pronounced prom king and queen, Jordan refuses to participate in the king-and-queen dance. When Tyler asks Simone to dance, she refuses and leaves. She goes outside to wait for Lucas, and they share a dance. Nova is having a bad time, and when Ali tells her the fountain centerpiece has failed, she cannot take it anymore. As she is about to leave, she hears the fountain start again and knows the only person who could have fixed it is Jesse. He walks up to her and asks her to prom. She agrees, and they dance followed by a kiss.

== Cast ==
- Aimee Teegarden as Nova Prescott, the class president who is determined to host a great prom.
- Thomas McDonell as Jesse Richter, the school bad boy.
- DeVaughn Nixon as Tyler Barso, Jordan's lacrosse-playing, self-absorbed boyfriend.
- Danielle Campbell as Simone Daniels, plays guitar and piano and is Lucas' lab partner and his prom date.
- Yin Chang as Mei Kwan, Nova's super smart friend who is dating Justin.
- Jared Kusnitz as Justin Wexler, Mei's steady, easy-going boyfriend.
- Nolan Sotillo as Lucas Arnaz, Corey's shy music-loving best friend who harbors a deep crush on Simone.
- Cameron Monaghan as Corey Doyle, Lucas' best friend.
- Kylie Bunbury as Jordan Lundley, Tyler Barso's girlfriend who is extremely popular
- Joe Adler as Robert 'Rolo' Banus, Nova's absent-minded friend
- Janelle Ortiz as Ali Gomez, Nova's other friend
- Jonathan Keltz as Brandon, Nova's crush
- Nicholas Braun as Lloyd Taylor, the shy, "invisible" kid at school who has trouble getting a date to prom
- Raini Rodriguez as Tess Torres, Lloyd's stepsister who tries to help her stepbrother in his hour of need.
- Christine Elise McCarthy as Sandra Linsey, Jesse's mother
- Dean Norris as Frank Prescott, Nova's over-protective father.
- Faith Ford as Kitty Prescott, Nova's mother
- Amy Pietz as Mrs. Doyle, Corey's mother
- Jere Burns as Principal Dunnan
- Aimee-Lynn Chadwick as Rachel, a goth girl.
- Robbie Tucker as Charlie Richter, Jesse's little brother
- Allie Trimm as Betsy
- Carlease Burke as Rhoda Wainwright
- Blair Fowler as Leah
- Madison Riley as Kristen
- Rocco Nugent as Anton
- Ivy Malone as Alice
- Chloe Little as Janel Lundley
- Kofi Siriboe as Max
- Kristopher Higgins as Derek

== Production ==
In February 2010, it was reported Walt Disney Studios was developing Prom a teen comedy following a group of high school students preparing for their Prom. Development was inspired by the theatrical success Disney had with High School Musical 3: Senior Year with the company describing the project as being in the vein of the works of John Hughes and Cameron Crowe. Disney planned to produce the film on a limited budget of $5-10 million and populate the cast with unknowns in the hopes of launching new stars and a potential franchise. Joe Nussbaum was hired to direct from a script by Katie Wech. In June of that year, Thomas McDonell, Aimeé Teegarden, Danielle Campbell, Nolan Sotillo, Yin Chang, Jared Kusnitz, Nicholas Braun, Ben Esler, Kylie Bunbury and DeVaughn Nixon.

While Prom is set in Michigan, filming took place in Los Angeles, California.

== Reception ==
=== Box office ===
In its opening weekend, the film grossed $4.9 million in 2,730 theaters, ranking fifth. By the end of its run, Prom grossed $10.1 million domestically. It earned a profit of $2,212,108 on DVD and Blu-Ray.

=== Critical reception ===
Review aggregate Rotten Tomatoes reports that 36% of 90 critics recommended the film, with an average rating of 5.1/10. The site's critics consensus reads: "Given its flatly descriptive title and live-action Disney pedigree, Prom is more nuanced and less cynical -- but also just as corny and clichéd -- as you might expect." At Metacritic the film has a weighted average score of 50 out of 100, based on 24 critics, indicating "mixed or average reviews". Audiences polled by CinemaScore gave the film an average grade of "B+" on an A+ to F scale.

Salon film critic Andre O'Heir gave the film a negative review, calling it "a would-be tween-oriented hit so scrubbed and sanitized and not worthy of paying attention to that it can barely be said to exist at all". Another film critic, Claudia Puig of USA Today, notes that Prom's "entertainment quotient comes up deficient". Conversely, Boxoffice Magazine film critic Pete Hammond offers a more positive review of the film, calling it a "highly entertaining original movie that's funny, touching, and real", while mixed reviewers note that it is a "predictable but painless pastiche of high school drama cliches that will give its intended tween audience a lot to squeal about."

== Home media ==
The film was released by Walt Disney Studios Home Entertainment on Blu-ray Disc, DVD, and movie download on August 30, 2011.

The release included the "Bloopers" and "Putting on Prom" extras, while the Blu-ray Disc combo pack included a bonus short called "Last Chance Lloyd" (directed by Taz Goldstein) that expands on Lloyd's search for a prom date as well as four deleted scenes, and seven music videos.

The film's download version included the "Bloopers" and "Putting on Prom" extras as well as three music videos by Allstar Weekend, Neon Trees, and Moon.

== Soundtrack ==
Pop band Allstar Weekend's song "Not Your Birthday" was used to promote the film. It was later included in iPhone/iPod app Tap Tap Revenge 4 as a free soundtrack song. Additionally, Example's "Kickstarts" was used in the trailer and Katy Perry's "Firework" was used in the trailer of the film and during the actual prom scene of the film. The soundtrack was released under Disney's Hollywood Records label, three days before the film's premiere date.

== Accolades ==
=== Young Artist Awards ===
| Year | Nominee / work | Award | Result |
|---|---|---|---|
| 2012 | Robbie Tucker | Best Performance in a Feature Film – Young Actor Ten and Under | Nominated |
