= Hayley Marshall =

Hayley Marshall may refer to:

- Hayley Marshall (The Originals)
- Hayley Marshall (Modern Family)
